= 27th Fajr International Film Festival =

Film festival in Iran

- Official poster
- Opening film: Every Night, Loneliness
- Location: Tehran, Iran
- Founded: 1983
- Awards: Crystal Simorgh; Golden Simorgh
- Editor-in-chief: Majid Shah-Hosseini
- No. of films: 277: 128 (Iranian films); 149 (foreign films)
- Festival date: 31 January – 10 February 2009
- Language: Persian, English

Fajr International Film Festival
- 28th 26th

The 27th Fajr International Film Festival (Persian: بیست و هفتمین جشنواره بین‌المللی فیلم فجر) held from 31 January to 10 February 2009 in Tehran, Iran.

Doubt (Varuzh Karim-Masihi, 2009) — which adapted from Shakespeare's Hamlet — was the festival's best film in "Competition of Iranian Cinema" and Snow (Aida Begić, 2008), a Bosnian film, was the festival's best film in "Competition of International Cinema".

== Competition of Iranian Cinema ==
=== Tributes ===
Opening ceremony of the 27th Fajr International Film Festival's Competition of Iranian Cinema
- Date: 30 January 2009
- Site: Milad Tower
- Hosted by: Mohammad-Reza Foroutan
- Produced by: Morteza Razzaq-Karimi
- Directed by: Majid Barzegar

Highlights
- Most awards: Barefoot in Paradise (1); Three Women (1)
- Most nominations: The Second Wife (2); Three Women (2)

Television coverage
- Channel: IRIB TV2
- Duration: 3 hours, 15 minutes

Opening ceremony of the festival's Competition of Iranian Cinema took place on 30 January 2009, at the Milad Tower in Tehran, Iran beginning at 7:45 p.m. IRST. (Note: Ceremony was scheduled for 7:00 pm)

Following individuals tributed by Golden Plaque:

- Ebrahim Hatamikia – Filmmaking occupations: director and screenwriter
- Mohammadreza Sharafoddin – Filmmaking occupations: producer and special effects supervisor
- Deceased Khosrow Shakibai – Filmmaking occupations: actor
- Rasul Sadr Ameli – Filmmaking occupations: producer, director and screenwriter
- Mahmoud Kalari – Filmmaking occupations: cinematographer

=== Advertisement competition ===
Winners of Crystal Simorgh are listed first, highlighted in boldface and indicated with a double dagger (‡).

Winners of secondary awards are listed second, highlighted in boldface and indicated with a dagger (†).

**Best Still Photography**: **Barefoot in Paradise – Ali Bagheri**‡; **Three Women – Amir ʿAbedi**‡; As Simple as That – Ali Tabrizi; The Second Wife – Ali Zareʿ	**Best Film Poster**: **No winner**; **The Second Wife – Ali Zareʿ**† (Note: Honorary Diploma winner); The Day Looms – Mahsa Ghabaei and Leila Miri; The Earth's Child – Heidar Rezaei
**Best Film Billboard**: **No winner**; **Three Women – Amir-Sheiban Khaghani**†; The Song of Sparrows – Behzad Khorshidi; There's Always a Woman – Hamid-Reza Es'haghi	**Best Film Trailer**: **No winner**; **Hidden Feeling – Amir-Sheiban Khaghani**†; **Invitation – Meysam Molaei**†; The Song of Sparrows – Mehrdad Khoshbakht; Loose Rope – Mehrshad Karkhani

=== Contending for Simorgh ===
Closing ceremony of the 27th Fajr International Film Festival's Competition of Iranian Cinema
- Date: 10 February 2009
- Site: Ministry of Interior Hall
- Hosted by: Mohammad-Reza Shahidifard
- Produced by: Morteza Razzaq-Karimi
- Directed by: Majid Barzegar

Highlights
- Best Film: Doubt
- Most awards: When We're All Asleep (3)
- Most nominations: Doubt and About Elly (11)

Television coverage
- Channel: IRIB TV2
- Duration: 3 hours, 30 minutes

Closing ceremony of the festival's Competition of Iranian Cinema took place on 10 February 2009, at the Ministry of Interior Hall in Tehran, Iran beginning at 7:25 p.m. IRST. The ceremony was televised by IRIB.

Awards and nominations of the Competition of Iranian Cinema sections are below:

Golden Simorgh

**Best Film with National Point of View**
- **As Blue as the Lilac – Ebrahim Asghari, producer**‡
  - **Motherland – Abolhassan Davoudi, producer**† (Note: Golden Plaque winner)
  - **Child and the Angel – Hassan Kalami, producer**†

Audience Choice

**Best Film**
- **Penniless – Mostafa Shayesteh, producer**‡
- **About Elly – Asghar Farhadi, producer**‡

==== Main competition ====
**Best Film**: **Doubt – Saeed Sa'di, producer**‡; Twenty – Pouran Derakhshandeh, producer; The Postman Doesn't Knock 3 Times – Javad Norouzbeigi, producer; About Elly – Asghar Farhadi, producer; Motherland – Abolhassan Davoudi, producer; When We're All Asleep – Bahram Beyzai, producer	**Best Director**: **Asghar Farhadi – About Elly**‡; **Abdolreza Kahani – Twenty**†; Hassan Fathi – The Postman Doesn't Knock 3 Times; Varuzh Karim-Masihi – Doubt; Tahmineh Milani – Superstar; Bahram Beyzai – When We're All Asleep
**Best Screenplay**: **Motherland – Abolhassan Davoudi and Farid Mostafavi**‡; Twenty – Abdolreza Kahani and Hossein Mahkam; Doubt – Varuzh Karim-Masihi; About Elly – Asghar Farhadi; Superstar – Tahmineh Milani; Karat 14 – Parviz Shahbazi	**Best Adapted Screenplay**: **Doubt – Varuzh Karim-Masihi, based on Hamlet by William Shakespeare**‡
**Best Actor**: **Shahab Hosseini – Superstar**‡; Parviz Parastui – Twenty; Shahab Hosseini – About Elly; Masoud Rayegan – Motherland; Mohammad-Reza Foroutan – Karat 14	**Best Actress**: **Leila Hatami – Penniless**‡; Taraneh Alidoosti – Doubt; Baran Kosari – About Elly; Farideh Faramarzi – The Empty Chair; Mona Ahmadi – Child and the Angel
**Best Supporting Actor**: **Alireza Khamseh – Twenty**‡; Hamed Komeili – Doubt; Saber Abar – About Elly; Kambiz Dirbaz – Karat 14; Afshin Hashemi – Child and the Angel	**Best Supporting Actress**: **Mahtab Keramati – Twenty**‡; Merila Zarei – About Elly; Pegah Ahangarani – Motherland; Tannaz Tabatabaei – The Voices; Leyla Zareh – The Postman Doesn't Knock 3 Times
**Best Cinematography**: **The Day Goes and the Night Comes – Morteza Poursamadi**‡; The Penalty – Saʿed Nikzat; Doubt – Bahram Badakhshani; About Elly – Hossein Jafarian; Superstar – Alireza Zarrindast	**Best Film Editing**: **When We're All Asleep – Bahram Beyzaei and Sepideh Abdolvahab**‡; The Postman Doesn't Knock 3 Times – Hassan Hassandoust; About Elly – Hayedeh Safiyari; Doubt – Varuzh Karim-Masihi; Child and the Angel – Mohammadreza Muini
**Best Score**: **Motherland – Karen Homayounfar**‡; The Postman Doesn't Knock 3 Times – Fardin Khalatbari; Heiran – Alireza Kohandeyri; Superstar – Nasser Cheshmazar; When We're All Asleep – Mohammad-Reza Darvishi	**Best Sound**: **About Elly – ~~Hassan Zahedi~~ Mohammad-Reza Delpak (Note: This award should be given for sound mixer but by mistake of ceremony executives, received by Hassan Zahedi who is the sound recorder of the film.)**‡; The Postman Doesn't Knock 3 Times – Hosein Abolsedgh; Doubt – Parviz Abnar; The Day Goes and the Night Comes – Mani Hashemian; The Voices – Parviz Abnar
**Best Set and Costume Design**: **When We're All Asleep – Atoosa Ghalamfarsaei and Iraj Raminfar**‡; The Penalty – Asghar Nejad-Imani; Doubt – Amir Esbati; The Voices – Atoosa Ghalamfarsaei; Child and the Angel – Mohsen Ahangarani	**Best Makeup**: **When We're All Asleep – Saeid Malekan**‡; The Postman Doesn't Knock 3 Times – Saeid Malekan; Doubt – Mohammadreza Qoumi; About Elly – Mehrdad Mirkiani; The Day Goes and the Night Comes – Soudabeh Khosravi
**Best Special Effects**: **As Blue As the Lilac – Davoud Rasoulian**‡; The Postman Doesn't Knock 3 Times – Abbas Shoghi; Child and the Angel – Javad Sharifi-Rad; The Mouse – Javad Sharifi-Rad	**Best Short Film**: **Where Is Fatemeh's House? – Fereydoun Najafi**‡; **Dream's Keys – Sara Namjoo**†; Old Men Never Die – Reza Jamali; Solitude – Mehrdad Sheikhan; Water Quatrains – Shahram Alidi

Non-nomination Crystal Simorgh

**Special Jury Prize**
- **Karat 14 – Parviz Shahbazi, producer**‡

Films with multiple nominations and awards

The following 12 films received multiple nominations:

Nominations	Film
11	Doubt
11	About Elly
8	The Postman Doesn't Knock 3 Times
6	When We're All Asleep
6	Twenty
5	Motherland
5	Superstar
5	Child and the Angel
3	Karat 14
3	The Voices
3	The Day Goes and the Night Comes
2	The Penalty

The following 5 films received multiple awards:

Awards	Film
3	When We're All Asleep
2	Doubt
2	About Elly
2	Motherland
2	Twenty

==== New Vision ====
**Best Film**: **Bleeding Heart – Hossein Haghgoo, producer**‡; Deportees 2 – Habibollah Kasehsaz and DEFC, producers; Penniless – Mostafa Shayesteh, producer; Doubt – Saeed Sa'di, producer; Child and the Angel – Hassan Kalami, producer	**Best Director**: **Varuzh Karim-Masihi – Doubt**‡; **Saman Estaraki – The Empty Chair**†; Hassan Fathi – The Postman Doesn't Knock 3 Times; Shalizeh Arefpour – Heiran; Mohammad-Reza Rahmani – Bleeding Heart; Omid Bonakdar and Keyvan Ali-Mohammadi – The Day Goes and the Night Comes

Non-nomination Crystal Simorgh

**Special Jury Prize**
- **Deportees 2 – Habibollah Kasehsaz and DEFC, producers**‡

Non-nominated Honorary Diploma

- Best Director: Masoud Naghashzadeh – Child and the Angel

Additional Honorary Diploma

- Best Actor: Hamed Behdad – Bleeding Heart
- Best Actress: Mona Ahmadi – Child and the Angel
- Best Screenplay: Penniless – Hamid Nematollah and Hadi Moghadamdoost
- Best Cinematography: When the Lemons Turned Yellow – Fereydoun Shirdel

==== Video-Cinema ====
**Best Film**: **Zeynab – Alireza Tavana and IRIB TV2, producers**‡; Water and Mirror – Kiumars Pourahmad, producer; White Piece's Move – Alireza Abolghaseminejad and Sima film, producers; The Fifth Killer – Manouchehr Zebardast, producer; Mikaʿil – Karamat Pourshahsavari, producer	**Best Director**: **Jamshid Bahmani – Mikaʿil**‡; **Pourya Azarbayjani – Water and Mirror**†; **Shahram Mokri – Ashkan, the Charmed Ring and Other Stories**†; Alireza Tavana – Zeynab; Mehdi Sabbaghzadeh – Mangrove

Non-nominated Honorary Diploma

- Best Director: Hassan Lafafian – White Piece's Move

==== Eye of the Reality ====
**Best Documentary Feature Film**: **Unfinished Picture: Bahman Jalali – Touraj Rabbani, producer**‡; This House Is Bright – Mahmoud Abdollahi, producer; My Heart Bleeds for Iran – Javad Mir-Hashemi and DEFC, producers	**Best Documentary Short Film**: **How Green Was Our Valley – Touraj Aslani, producer**‡; **Frozen Bubble – Touraj Aslani and Amir Joghataei, producers**†; Who Is That Man? – Mahnaz Rokni, producer; Square Without A Fence – DEFC, producer; The Noise – Babak Majidi, producer

Non-nominated Honorary Diploma

- Best Documentary Short Film: Dahieh – Habibollah Valinejad, producer

=== Presenters and performers ===
The following individuals, listed in order of appearance, presented awards or performed musical numbers.

==== Presenters ====
Name(s)	Role
Gholam-Ali Haddad-Adel; Mohammad-Hossein Saffar Harandi; Mohammad-Reza Jafari-Jelveh	Presenters of the award for Best Film with National Point of View
Mahmoud Farshchian; Mohammad-Mehdi Asgarpour	Presenters of the award for Audience Choice of Best Film

==== Performers ====
Name(s)	Role
Hesameddin Seraj	Performer of the opening ceremony
Salar Aghili and Dastan Ensemble	Performers of the closing ceremony

== Competition of International Cinema ==
Closing ceremony of the 27th Fajr International Film Festival's Competition of International Cinema
- Date: 3 February 2009
- Site: Vahdat Hall
- Hosted by: Akbar ʿAlemi
- Produced by: Morteza Razzaq-Karimi
- Directed by: Majid Barzegar

Highlights
- Best Film: Snow
- Most awards: Snow (2); Pandora's Box (2)

Television coverage
- Duration: 2 hours, 25 minutes

Closing ceremony of the festival's Competition of International Cinema took place on 3 February 2009, at the Vahdat Hall in Tehran, Iran beginning at 7:35 p.m. IRST.

=== World Panorama ===
"World Panorama" is the main section of competition of International Cinema.

Audience Choice

Crystal Simorgh for Audience Choice of Best Film
- When We're All Asleep – Bahram Beyzai‡ (Iran)

Crystal Simorgh for Best Film: Snow – Aida Begić‡ (Bosnia and Herzegovina, France, Germany and Iran)	Crystal Simorgh for Best Director: Aida Begić – Snow‡ (Bosnia and Herzegovina, France, Germany and Iran); Motherland – Abolhassan Davoudi† (Iran, UAE and Germany)
Crystal Simorgh for Best Screenplay: 9 mm – Taylan Barman and Kenan Görgün‡ (Belgium and France)	Crystal Simorgh for Best Performance: Tsilla Chelton, Derya Alabora and Ovul Avkiran – Pandora's Box‡ (Turkey)
Crystal Simorgh for Best Technical and Artistic Achievement: The Divine Weapon – Kim Yoo-jin, director‡ (South Korea)	Crystal Simorgh for Best Short Film: Amin – David Dusa‡ (France, Germany and Netherlands) (Live Action); Why Dogs Hate Cats? – Lida Fazli‡ (Iran) (Animated)

Non-nomination Crystal Simorgh

Crystal Simorgh of Special Jury Prize
- Pandora's Box – Yeşim Ustaoğlu, director‡ (Turkey)

=== Seeking the Truth ===
"Seeking the Truth" section also known as "Competition of Spiritual Cinema". This section organized to emphasize cinema's incomparable capacity for depiction of the transcendental realms. Films which guide viewers to spiritual values and foster elevated human characteristics entered in this section.

Crystal Simorgh for Best Film: Every Night, Loneliness – Rasul Sadr Ameli‡ (Iran)	Crystal Simorgh for Best Director: Juan Antonio Bayona – The Orphanage‡ (Mexico and Spain)
Crystal Simorgh for Best Screenplay: Walking My Life – Satoshi Isaka‡ (Japan)

Additional Honorary Diploma

- Best Performance: Fattaneh Malek-Mohammadi – Superstar (Iran)

=== Eastern Vista ===
"Eastern Vista" section also known as "Competition of Asian Cinema". This section organized to promote film art and industry in Asian countries. Asia is the main core of the East, and East is not limited to a geographic concept, whereas it also includes history, culture, identity and all the shared elements of the people in this part of the world. in addition to the diversity of cultures in the Asian countries, this section also insists on the necessity of connections, unification, and cooperation of these countries. The "Special Asian Unity Prize" is created with respect to this idea and goal.

Crystal Simorgh for Best Film: With a Girl of Black Soil – Jeon Soo-il‡ (South Korea)	Crystal Simorgh for Best Director: Barmak Akram – Kabuli Kid‡ (France and Afghanistan)
Crystal Simorgh for Best Screenplay: Best Wishes for Tomorrow – Takashi Koizumi‡ (Japan)

==== Special Asian Unity Prize ====
"Special Asian Unity Prize" from Asian Parliamentary Assembly awarded to:

- Motherland – Abolhassan Davoudi (Iran, UAE and Germany)

=== Turquoise Road Prize ===
"Turquoise Road Prize" had no winner. The prize scheduled to the Best Film from Economic Cooperation Organization countries, jointly with ECO Cultural Institute.

=== Path of the Prophets ===
"Path of the Prophets" section awarded "Interfaith Award" to:

- A Time to Love – Ebrahim Forouzesh (Iran)

=== Moustapha Akkad's Special Prize ===
"Golden Banner" in memorial of deceased Syrian director Moustapha Akkad, designed to persuade that part of the world cinema which has a respectful look at Islam and its greatness. The prize awarded to:

- Laila's Birthday – Rashid Masharawi (Palestine, Tunisia and Netherlands)

=== Non-competition sections ===
Special Screenings, retrospectives and memorials

== Ceremony information ==
The Kingdom of Solomon (Shahriar Bahrani, 2010) removed from the festival's list of accepted films, due to incompleteness of post-production processes.

One of the most controversial events of the Iranian cinema's passed year was Golshifteh Farahani's appearance in Body of Lies (Ridley Scott, 2008). Because of her performance in a Hollywood film, Asghar Farhadi's About Elly faced preventing its screening at the Fajr International Film Festival. At last, President Mahmoud Ahmadinejad stepped in and ordered the removal of the obstacles.

Bahram Beyzai's When We're All Asleep awarded by main prizes of the Fajr International Film Festival while many of his plays and scripts had rejected for production permit by government, after the revolution.

== Footnotes ==
=== Sources ===
- Burnett, Mark Thornton (2019). 'Hamlet' and World Cinema. Cambridge University Press. ISBN 978-1-107-13550-5.
- Esfandiary, Shahab (2012). Iranian Cinema and Globalization: National, Transnational, and Islamic Dimensions. Bristol: Intellect. ISBN 978-1-84150-470-4.
