= Love-stricken =

- International poster
- Directed by: Ali Hatami
- Written by: Ali Hatami
- Produced by: Ali Hatami
- Starring: Mohammad Ali Keshavarz; Akbar Abdi; Amin Tarokh; Saeed Poorsamimi; Faramarz Sedighi; Fathali Oveisi; Leila Hatami
- Cinematography: Mahmoud Kalari
- Edited by: Ruhollah Emami
- Music by: Hossein Alizadeh
- Release date: 1 April 1992 (Iran)
- Running time: 91 minutes
- Country: Iran
- Language: Persian

Love-stricken (Persian: دل‌شدگان) is a 1992 Iranian historical drama film directed by Ali Hatami. The movie is mainly about some Iranian classical musicians in Ghajar era and their struggle to release their first Record which takes them on a journey to France. The film uses many notable Iranian actors and actresses. Among them are: Amin Tarokh, Akbar Abdi, Saeed Poursamimi, Mohamad Ali Keshavarz, Jamshid Hashempour, Hamid Jebelli, Fathali Oveisi, Shahla Riahi, Leili Rashidi, Leila Hatami, and Anna Borkowska.

Love-stricken is in celebration and praise of Iranian music. At the beginning of the film an intertitle is seen which says: "This film is dedicated to The Great Masters of Iranian Music in the millennium anniversary of Barbad". The film music was composed by famous Iranian musicians such as Hussein Alizadeh as composer and Mohammad Reza Shajarian as singer. Love-stricken was the 13th film of Ali Hatami, made after the commercial and artistic successes of his previous films such as: Mother, Sooteh-Delan, Sattar Khan, Hajji Washington and Kamalolmolk.

== Title ==
According to Dehkhoda dictionary, the word "Del Shodegan" is the plural form of "Delshodeh". In Persian it means "the lovelorn" or "worried" people. "love-stricken" or "love-struck" is another translation.

== Plot ==
His imperial majesty Ahmad Shah Qajar asks a group of Iranian musicians, unaffiliated with the royal court, to record a sample of Persian Classical Music on newly invented gramophone at the Conservatoire de Paris. A group of best musicians gather under the direction of Maestro Delnavaz. A singer named Taher (Amin Tarokh) also accompanies them to the journey to Paris.

They can record several gramophone discs after a lot of troubles. Taher who has fallen in love with a blind Turkish princess dies of an illness. As the others decide to come back to Iran, one of them says he wants to stay in Europe and learn "scientific music". Other members return to Iran with broken hearts, their friend's corpse and some recorded gramophone discs of Iranian treasure.

== Cast ==
- Faramarz Sadighi as Maestro Delnavaz
- Amin Tarokh as Taher Khan Bahr-eh Nour
- Akbar Abdi as Agha Faraj Boulsik
- Jamshid Hashempur as Iran's Ambassador to France
- Shahla Riahi as Delnavaz's Wife
- Saeed Poursamimi as Naser-Khan Deylaman
- Mohamad Ali Keshavarz as Mirza Mahmoud
- Hamid Jebeli as Khosro Khan Rahabi
- Leila Hatami as Leila
- Leili Rashidi as Agha Faraj's Wife
- Anna Borkowska as Madam
- Saeed Amir Soleymani as Nayeb Al-saltaneh
- Jalal Moghadam as Eesa-khan-e Vazir
- Rogheyeh Chehreh-Azad as Dayeh
- Turan Mehrzad as Naser Khan's Wife
- Mehri Vadadian as Faraj's Mother
- Soroor Nejatollahi as Khosor Khan's Wife
- Hooshang Beheshti as Haj Agha Monfared Nabatriz
- Ali Asghar Garmsiri as Ostad Yousef
- Babak Eskandari as Ahmad Shah
- Elmira Abdi as Agha Faraj Daughter
- Foad Chavmeh as Taher's Childhood
- Rashid Aslani as Afandi

== Production ==
Ali Hatami wrote about 4 hours of script for Love-stricken. Although all of the script was shot, they had to edit it to a normal 90 minute film. The actual film was shot in 19 acts, but Hatami cut out about 10 acts of it in the editing room.

== Music ==
Love-stricken (Original Motion Picture Soundtrack)

Soundtrack album by Hossein Alizadeh and Mohammad Reza Shajarian
- Released: 2000
- Length: 56:13

Music of the film is composed by Hossein Alizadeh (tar), Saeed Farajpouri (kamancheh), Arshad Tahmasebi (tar) and Dariush Zargari (santur). Mohammad Reza Shajarian is the lead singer of the score. Although at first Hatami wanted Hossein Dehlavi to cooperate with Alizadeh but Dehlavi thought it would be better if Alizadeh worked on the tracks alne. For the lyrics different poems of Hafiz, Fereydun Moshiri and Ali Hatami was used. ٰThe soundtrack is dedicated to The Great Masters of Iranian Music in the millennium anniversary of Barbad.

=== Track listing ===
No.	Title	Artist(s)	Length
1.	"Tar-o-Pud"	Hossein Alizadeh	2:45
2.	"Golchehreh"	Hossein Alizadeh	2:13
3.	"Mersieh" (Requiem)	Hossein Alizadeh	3:35
4.	"Golchehreh II"	Hossein Alizadeh	0:20
5.	"Tar-o-Pud II"	Hossein Alizadeh	1:15
6.	"Khial" (Dream)	Hossein Alizadeh	0:41
7.	"Aroosi" (The Wedding)	Hossein Alizadeh	0:45
8.	"Ziafat" (Party)	Hossein Alizadeh	3:55
9.	"Peymaneh-ye Eshgh"	Hossein Alizadeh	3:03
10.	"Delshodegan" (The Love-sticken)	Hossein Alizadeh	1:25
11.	"Tasnif-e Delshodegan" (The Ballad of Delshodegan)	Hossein Alizadeh	3:46
12.	"Omid-e Eshgh"	Hossein Alizadeh	3:55
13.	"Ro'ya-ye Tonbak" (The Dream of the Goblet Drum)	Hossein Alizadeh	1:05
14.	"Khatereh" (Memories)	Hossein Alizadeh	1:07
15.	"Paseban-e Harame Del"	Hossein Alizadeh	5:41
16.	"Tasnif-e Omid-e Eshgh"	Hossein Alizadeh	3:27
17.	"Orouj" (Ascension)	Hossein Alizadeh	2:05
18.	"Gholam-e Eshgh" (Love's Slave)	Hossein Alizadeh	4:46
19.	"Bazgasht" (The Return)	Hossein Alizadeh	2:20
20.	"Mersieh II" (Requiem II)	Hossein Alizadeh	2:28
21.	"Hamdeli" (Empathy)	Hossein Alizadeh	0:38
22.	"Vedaa'" (Farewell)	Hossein Alizadeh	0:33
23.	"Marsh-e Azaa" (Funeral March)	Hossein Alizadeh	3:17
24.	"Golchehtreh III"	Hossein Alizadeh	0:54

== Other personnel ==
- Aziz Sa'ati – still photographer
- Morteza Momayez – title
- Abdollah Eskandari – makeup artist
- Ali Hatami – art direction
- Ali Hatami – costume design
- Ahmad Bakhshi – assistant director
- Noor Mohammad Najjari – assistant director
- Hassan Yektapanah – assistant director

== Awards and nominations ==
Love-stricken was nominated in three categories at the 1992 Fajr Film Festival as follows:

- Best Sound Recorder
- Best Sound Mix
- Best Music

It was also nominated at the 2001 Three Continents Festival for "Best Film".

== See also ==
- Barbad
- Ali Hatami
- Iranian music
- Iranian traditional music
