= Leila Hatami =

Iranian actress (born 1972)

- لیلا حاتمی
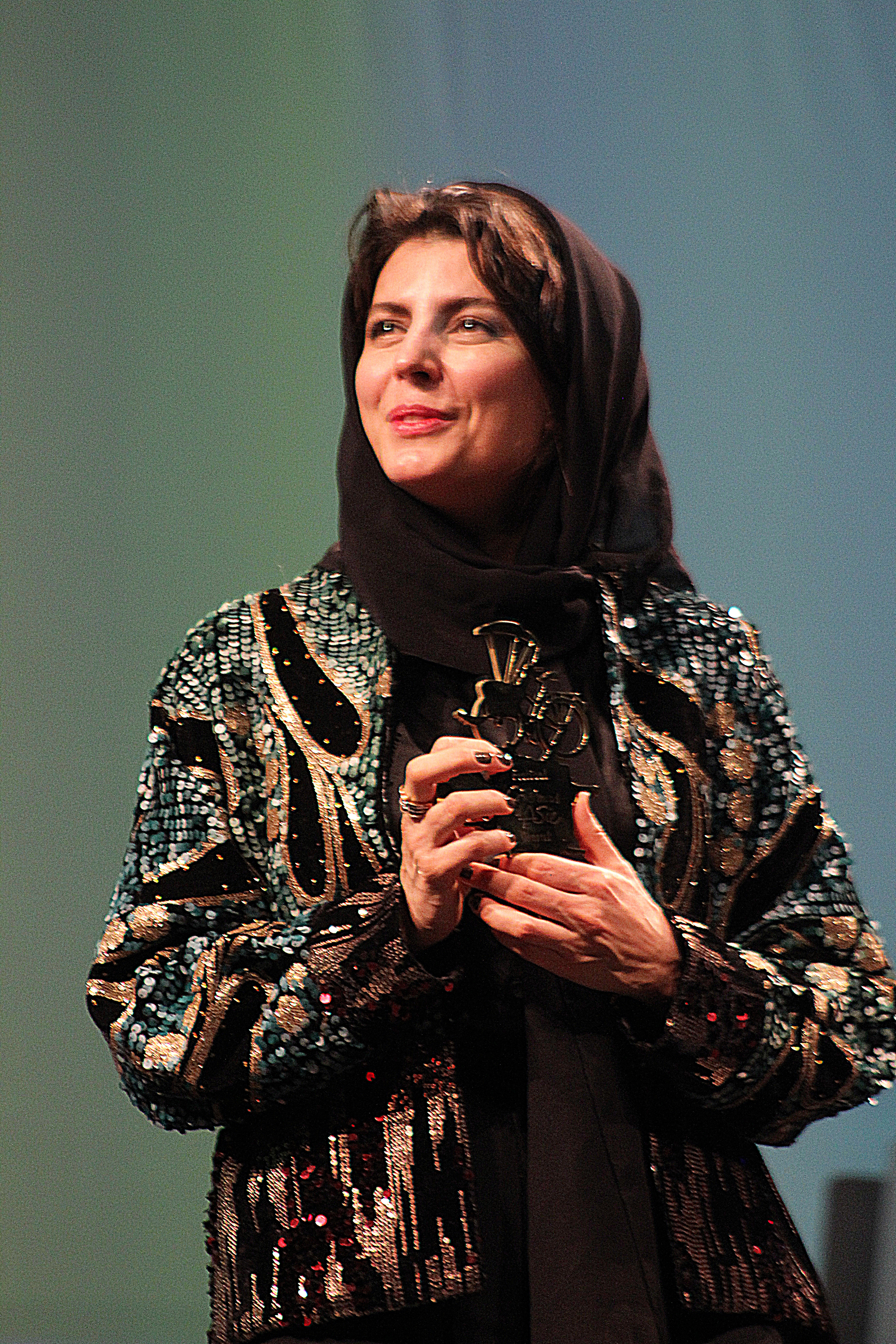
- Hatami in 2022
- Born: 1 October 1972 (age 54); Tehran, Imperial State of Iran
- Education: École Polytechnique Fédérale de Lausanne
- Occupation: Actress
- Years active: 1984–present
- Spouse: Ali Mosaffa (m. 1998)
- Children: 2
- Parent(s): Ali Hatami; Zari Khoshkam
- Relatives: Amir Banoo Karimi (mother-in-law)

Leila Hatami (Persian: لیلا حاتمی; born 1 October 1972) is an Iranian actress. Regarded as amongst the finest actresses of Iranian cinema and one of the most prominent performers in the 21st century, she is recognized for her realistic acting in drama films; gaining international fame for her role as Simin in Academy Award-winning film A Separation (2011), for which she received the Silver Bear for Best Actress.

Hatami made her film debut in the drama Kamalolmolk (1984) portraying Kamal-ol-molk. She played her first lead role in the drama Leila (1997) as a barren woman, for which she won the Diploma of Honor at the Fajr Film Festival and gained public attention. Her portrayal of a naive woman in Penniless (2009) earned her the Crystal Simorgh for Best Actress at the Fajr Film Festival, and she later won the award again for her portrayal of a disordered woman in Subdued (2017). She has also been nominated for the Crystal Simorgh for her roles in Sheida (1999), The Deserted Station (2002), Season Salad (2005), Forty Years Old (2010), A Separation (2011), The Orange Suit (2012) and Time to Love (2015).

Hatami won the Montreal World Film Festival Award for Best Actress for her performance in The Deserted Station (2002). She won the Silver Bear for Best Actress at the Berlin International Film Festival for her performance in the drama A Separation (2011). In 2017, IndieWire praised her performance in the film as one of the best performances of the 21st century and considered Hatami deserved one Oscar Award for her performance in it. She received the Crystal Globe for Best Actress at the Karlovy Vary International Film Festival for her performance in The Last Step (2012). In 2012, she was appointed Chevalier of the Order of Arts and Letters by the French government. She has been included in the list of the most beautiful women in the Middle East by the website Wonderslist.

== Early life ==
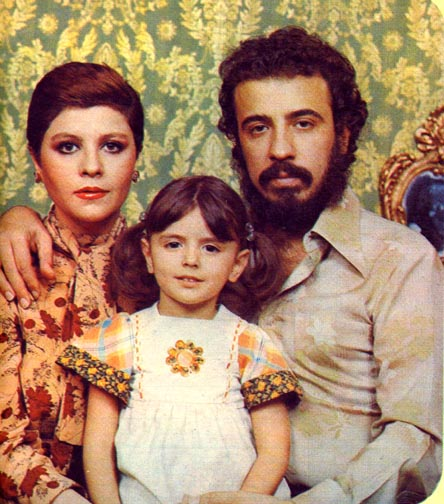
Hatami as a child with her parents Ali Hatami and Zari Khoshkam

Leila Hatami was born on 1 October 1972, in Tehran, Iran, to influential Iranian director Ali Hatami and actress Zari Khoshkam. Leila first appeared in a film when she was 10, set in the times of the 19th century Iranian painter Kamal-ol-Molk. In it, she played the painter as a young boy. Then eight years later in 1992, she appeared in another one of her father’s films called Love-stricken where she played a blind princess. However she did not originally intend to pursue acting. In high school, she studied mathematical physics.

After finishing high school, she moved to Lausanne, Switzerland and started her studies in mechanical engineering at the Swiss Federal Institute of Technology in Lausanne (EPFL). After two years Hatami changed her major to French literature. She completed her study of French. Then her father became ill and she went back to Iran. He died in 1996. That same year, she played her first adult role in drama Leila which was directed by film director Dariush Mehrjui. Her acting received praise both inside and outside of Iran.

== Career ==
Hatami played several small roles in her father's productions throughout her youth, including in the Hezar Dastan television series and the Kamalolmolk movie. Her first leading film appearance was the title role in the 1997 film Leila, directed by Dariush Mehrjui. She received the Diploma of Honor for Best Actress from the 15th Fajr Film Festival. Following this, she continued to act regularly in Iranian cinema.

She has starred in dozens of films, and has often garnered critical acclaim and accolades. For her performance in The Deserted Station (2002), she was nominated for the Fajr Film Festival Award for Best Actress and Hatami won the Best Actress Award at the 26th Montreal World Film Festival.

She has appeared in her husband's films as a director, Portrait of a Lady Far Away (2005) and The Last Step (2012). She also designed the sets and the costumes of The Last Step and, in addition to receiving the Karlovy Vary International Film Festival Award for Best Actress for her performance, she received a nomination for the Crystal Simorgh Fajr Film Festival Award for Best Production Design and Costume Design for her work on the film.

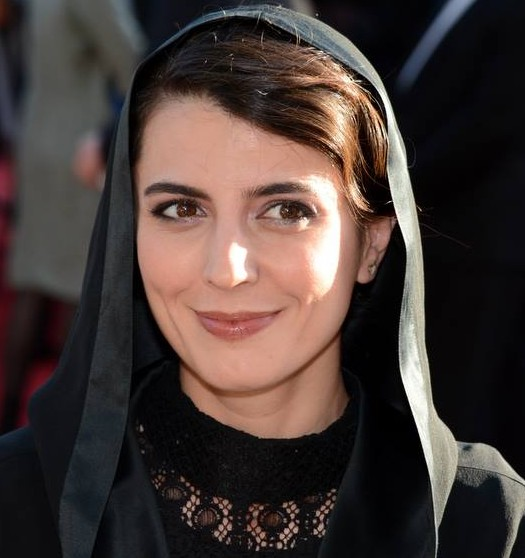
Hatami at the 2013 Cannes Film Festival

In 2012, Hatami received international attention for her role in the critically acclaimed Asghar Farhadi film, A Separation, which won dozens of accolades, including the Academy Award for Best Foreign Language Film. Her performance earned critical acclaim and various awards, including the Silver Bear Award for Best Actress at the Berlin Film Festival. IndieWire praised her portrayal as one of the best female performances of the 21st century.

In June 2017, the Academy of Motion Picture Arts and Sciences invited Hatami to become a member.

=== Judging at film festivals; cheek kiss controversy ===
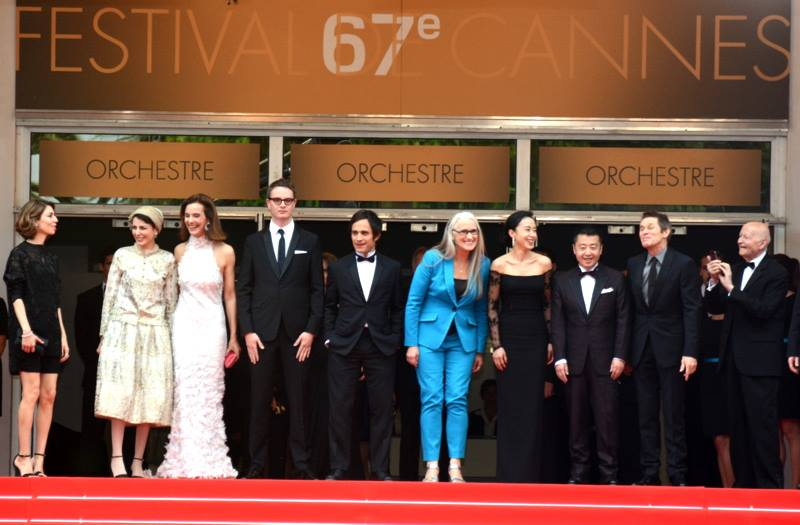
Hatami (second from left) alongside fellow jury members at the 2014 Cannes Film Festival

In April 2014, she was announced as a member of the main competition jury at the 2014 Cannes Film Festival. Whilst there, Hatami greeted 83-year-old Cannes Film Festival President Gilles Jacob with a kiss on the cheek, which is a common form of greeting in France. Iran's Deputy Culture Minister Hossein Noushabadi criticized her for this, saying:

I hope that those who attend international arenas as Iranian women would be careful about the chastity and dignity of Iranians so that the image of the Iranian woman is not tainted before the world. "If they respect Islamic norms and the national culture and beliefs of Iran, it would be a desirable thing for Iranian celebrities to go abroad, but if their presence lacks regard for social values and ethical criteria, the Iranian nation is not going to accept it.

In May 2014, after receiving significant backlash for the kiss in Iran—including calls for her to be jailed and flogged—Hatami later apologized for her actions in a letter.

==== Full list ====
- 2001 - Dubai Short Film Festival
- 2006 - 41st Karlovy Vary Film Festival – Main competition
- 2011 - Marrakech Film Festival
- 2011 - Deauville Film Festival
- 2012 - Rome Film Festival
- 2012 - Kastendorf Film Festival (Jury President)
- 2013 - Antalya Golden Orange Film Festival
- 2014 - 67th Cannes Film Festival – Main competition
- 2022 - Vesoul Film Festival of Asian Cinema (Jury President)
- 2022 - 79th Venice Film Festival – Main competition

== Personal life ==
Hatami married Ali Mosaffa, her co-star in Leila (1997) in 1998. They have two children: a son named Mani (born February 2007) and a daughter named Asal (born October 2008).

Beside her native Persian language she is fluent in French, English, and German.

== Filmography ==
=== Film ===
Year	Title	Role	Director	Notes
1984	Kamalolmolk	Young Kamal-ol-molk	Ali Hatami	
1992	Love-stricken	Leila	Ali Hatami	
1997	Leila	Leila	Dariush Mehrjui	
1999	Sheida	Sheida Fatemi	Kamal Tabrizi	
2000	The Mix	Ms. Salimi	Dariush Mehrjui	Cameo appearance
2001	Water and Fire	Maryam	Fereydoun Jeyrani	
2001	Sweet Jam	Jalal's Mother	Marzieh Boroomand	
2002	The Deserted Station	Mahtab	Alireza Raeesian	
2002	Low Heights	Narges	Ebrahim Hatamikia	
2005	Season Salad	Leila	Fereydoun Jeyrani	
2005	Portrait of a Lady Far Away	The Young Lady	Ali Mosaffa	
2005	Poet of the Wastes	The Young Lady	Mohammad Ahmadi	
2005	The Command	Foroozandeh	Masoud Kimiai	
2007	Every Night, Loneliness	Atiyeh	Rasoul Sadrameli	
2008	Shirin	Woman in Audience	Abbas Kiarostami	
2009	Penniless	Shokouh	Hamid Nematollah	
2010	Forty Years Old	Negar	Alireza Raeesian	
2010	A Walk in the Fog	Roya	Bahram Tavakkoli	
2010	There Are Things You Don't Know	Doctor	Fardin Sahebzamani	
2011	Felicity Land	Yasi	Maziar Miri	
2011	A Separation	Simin	Asghar Farhadi	
2011	Beloved Sky	The Lady	Dariush Mehrjui	
2012	The Last Step	Leyli	Ali Mosaffa	Also costume designer
2012	The Orange Suit	Nahal Nahavandi	Dariush Mehrjui	
2012	Meeting Leila	Leila	Adel Yaraghi	
2013	The Sealed Secret	Saba	Hadi Moghaddamdoost	
2014	What's the Time in Your World?	Goli Ebtehaj	Safi Yazdanian	
2015	Time to Love	Bita Tamadon	Alireza Raeesian	
2016	I	Azar Mirzaei	Soheil Beiraghi	
2017	Subdued	Mina	Hamid Nematollah	
2018	The Last Fiction	Shahrzad (Voice)	Ashkand Rahgozar	Animation
2018	Pig	Shiva Mohajer	Mani Haghighi	
2018	Bomb: A Love Story	Mitra	Peyman Moaadi	
2018	Tale of the Sea	Parvaneh	Bahman Farmanara	
2019	A Man Without a Shadow	Saye Tamadon	Alireza Raeesian	
2019	We Are All Together	Mrs. Mozhdehi	Kamal Tabrizi	
2022	Imagine	Various	Ali Behrad	
2024	The Old Bachelor	Rana	Oktay Baraheni	
2025	The Killer and the Savage	Ziba	Hamid Nematollah	
2025	A Time in Eternity	Maryam	Mehdi Norowzian	
2026	Idol		Hamid Nematollah	
TBA	The Way of the Wind	Mary Magdalene	Terrence Malick	Completed

=== Web ===
Year	Title	Role	Director	Platform	Notes
2019	Blue Whale	Anahita Kashef	Fereydoun Jeyrani	Filimo	Recurring role
2022–2024	Women's Secret Network	Delbar	Afshin Hashemi	Namava	Main role

=== Television ===
Year	Title	Role	Director	Network	Notes
1977	Divorce	Bahare	Massoud Asadollahi	NIRT	Episode: "Addicted"
1987	Hezar Dastan	Young Amine-aghdas	Ali Hatami	IRIB TV1	1 episode
1987	Mr. Hekayati		Iraj Tahmasb	IRIB TV1	Children's TV show
1984	Guys Wake Up, Guys Be Alert	Herself	Marzieh Boroumand		Children's TV show
2000	The English Briefcase	Mastaneh Pirayesh	Ziaeddin Dorri	IRIB TV1	Main role
2007	Paridokht	Paridokht	Saman Moghaddam	IRIB TV2	Main role

== Awards and nominations ==
List of awards and nominations received by Leila Hatami
Organizations	Year	Category	Work	Result	Ref.
Berlin International Film Festival	2011	Silver Bear for Best Actress	A Separation	Won	
Karlovy Vary International Film Festival	2012	Best Actress	The Last Step	Won	
Montreal World Film Festival	2002	Best Actress	The Deserted Station	Won	
Palm Springs International Film Festival	2012	the FIPRESCI for Best Actress	A Separation	Won	
Asian Film Awards	2012	Best Actress	A Separation	Nominated	
Asian Film Awards	2012	Favorite Actress	A Separation	Nominated	
International Cinephile Society	2012	Best Supporting Actress	A Separation	Nominated	
Zimbabwe International Film Festival	2010	Best Actress	Every Night, Loneliness	Won	
Fajr Film Festival	1997	Best Actress	Leila	Runner-up	
Fajr Film Festival	1999	Best Actress	Sheida	Nominated	
Fajr Film Festival	2002	Best Actress	The Deserted Station	Nominated	
Fajr Film Festival	2005	Best Actress	Season Salad	Nominated	
Fajr Film Festival	2009	Best Actress	Penniless	Won	
Fajr Film Festival	2010	Best Actress	Forty Years Old	Nominated	
Fajr Film Festival	2011	Best Actress	A Separation	Nominated	
Fajr Film Festival	2011	Best Actress	There Are Things You Don't Know	Nominated	
Fajr Film Festival	2012	Best Actress	Orange Suit	Nominated	
Fajr Film Festival	2015	Best Actress	Time to Love	Nominated	
Fajr Film Festival	2017	Best Actress	Subdued	Won	
Hafez Awards	1997	Best Actress– Motion Picture	Leila	Won	
Hafez Awards	1999	Best Actress– Motion Picture	Sheida	Nominated	
Hafez Awards	2001	Best Actress– Motion Picture	Water and Fire	Nominated	
Hafez Awards	2002	Best Actress– Motion Picture	Low Heights	Nominated	
Hafez Awards	2006	Best Actress– Motion Picture	The Command	Nominated	
Hafez Awards	2011	Best Actress– Motion Picture	Penniless	Nominated	
Hafez Awards	2014	Best Actress– Motion Picture	The Last Step	Nominated	
Hafez Awards	2016	Best Actress– Motion Picture	Time to love	Nominated	
Hafez Awards	2017	Best Actress– Motion Picture	I	Nominated	
Hafez Awards	2018	Best Actress– Motion Picture	Subdued	Won	
Hafez Awards	2019	Best Actress– Motion Picture	Bomb: A Love Story	Nominated	
Hafez Awards	2020	Best Actress – Television Series Drama	Blue Whale	Nominated	
Hafez Awards	2023	Best Actress– Motion Picture	Imagine	Nominated	
Hafez Awards	2024	Best Actress – Television Series Comedy	Women's Secret Network	Nominated	
Iran Cinema Celebration	2001	Best Actress	Water and Fire	Won	
Iran Cinema Celebration	2002	Best Actress	Low Heights	Nominated	
Iran Cinema Celebration	2010	Best Actress	A Walk in the Fog	Nominated	
Iran Cinema Celebration	2012	Best Actress	The Last Step	Nominated	
Iran Cinema Celebration	2017	Best Actress	Subdued	Won	
Iran's Film Critics and Writers Association	2001	Best Actress	Water and Fire	Won (Note: Best Actress of the Year as chosen by Iranian film writers and critics)	
Iran's Film Critics and Writers Association	2010	Best Actress	Penniless	Won	
Iran's Film Critics and Writers Association	2010	Best Actress	A Walk in the Fog	Nominated	
Iran's Film Critics and Writers Association	2012	Best Actress	The Last Step	Nominated	
Iran's Film Critics and Writers Association	2013	Best Actress	The Sealed Secret	Nominated	
Iran's Film Critics and Writers Association	2015	Best Actress	What's the Time in Your World?	Nominated	
Iran's Film Critics and Writers Association	2016	Best Actress	I	Won	
Iran's Film Critics and Writers Association	2017	Best Actress	Subdued	Won	
Iran's Film Critics and Writers Association	2018	Best Actress	Bomb: A Love Story	Nominated	

== See also ==
- List of Iranian actresses
