= Forty Years Old =

2010 Iranian film

- Directed by: Alireza Raisian
- Cinematography: Mahmoud Kalari
- Edited by: Hayedeh Safiyari
- Music by: Christophe Rezai
- Release date: 2010
- Country: Iran

Forty Years Old (Persian: چهل سالگی, romanized: Chehel salegi, also known as Love at 40) is an Iranian 2010 film by Alireza Raisian. The script was written by Mostafa Rastegari, and the film was lensed by Mahmoud Kalari. Leila Hatami, Farzan Athari, Ezzatolah Entezami and Mohammad Reza Forutan starred in the principal roles.

Raisian nominated for Crystal Simorgh for Best Film and Crystal Simorgh for Best Director, and Rastegari won the Crystal Simorgh for Best Adapted Screenplay for his script at the 28th Fajr Film Festival.
