= People's Children =

- Persian: بچه مردم
- Directed by: Mahmoud Karimi
- Written by: Mahmoud Karimi; Faezeh Yarmohammadi
- Produced by: Seyyed Ali Ahmadi
- Starring: Gohar Kheirandish; Reza Kianian; Hassan Majooni; Behrouz Shoeibi; Siamak Safari; Siavash Cheraghipour; Omid Roohani; Zahra Davoudnejad; Javad Yahyavi
- Cinematography: Milad Partovi
- Edited by: Emad Khodabakhsh
- Music by: Christophe Rezai
- Distributed by: Shahr-e Farang; FilmNet (online)
- Release dates: 1 February 2025 (Fajr Film Festival); 22 October 2025 (Iran); 12 May 2026 (online)
- Running time: 117 minutes
- Country: Iran
- Language: Persian
- Box office: 14,788,228,000 toman

People's Children (Persian: بچه مردم, romanized: Bache-ye Mardom) is a 2025 Iranian drama film directed by Mahmoud Karimi in his feature directorial debut. Written by Karimi and Faezeh Yarmohammadi and produced by Seyyed Ali Ahmadi.

The film premiered at the 43rd Fajr International Film Festival on 1 February 2025, where it received multiple nominations and won the Crystal Simorgh for Best Screenplay, as well as the Crystal Simorgh for Best First Director and the Crystal Simorgh for Best Editing. It was released theatrically in Iran on 22 October 2025 before becoming available for online streaming on FilmNet on 12 May 2026.

== Synopsis ==
A newborn baby is abandoned outside the entrance of an orphanage, where he grows up alongside several other children. Raised without knowledge of their biological families, the children spend their early years searching for a sense of belonging while confronting loneliness and social isolation.

As they reach adolescence and adulthood, each leaves the orphanage to pursue a different path in life. Against the backdrop of the Iranian Revolution of 1979, they encounter personal, emotional, and economic hardships while attempting to establish independent lives.

With the outbreak of the Iran–Iraq War, some of the former orphans volunteer for military service, and the conflict profoundly affects their futures. As their lives diverge, they continue to grapple with questions of identity, family, and belonging shaped by both their upbringing and the turbulent events surrounding them.

== Cast ==
- Gohar Kheirandish as Mahin
- Reza Kianian
- Hassan Majooni
- Behrouz Shoeibi
- Siamak Safari
- Siavash Cheraghipour
- Omid Roohani
- Zahra Davoudnejad
- Javad Yahyavi
- Venus Kanli
- Kambiz Amini
- Mahbod Jahannoush
- Siamak Adib
- Zari Karimi
- Siavash Jame
- Ehsan Ahmadi
- Farzin Falsafin
- Ilya Yaghoubi
- Mania Azizi

== Awards and nominations ==
Year	Award	Category	Recipient(s)	Result	Ref.
2025	43rd Fajr International Film Festival	Best Film	Seyyed Ali Ahmadi	Nominated	
2025	43rd Fajr International Film Festival	Best Director	Mahmoud Karimi	Nominated	
2025	43rd Fajr International Film Festival	Best Actor	Mahbod Jahannoush	Nominated	
2025	43rd Fajr International Film Festival	Best Supporting Actor	Reza Kianian	Nominated	
2025	43rd Fajr International Film Festival	Best Screenplay	Mahmoud Karimi; Faezeh Yarmohammadi	Won	
2025	43rd Fajr International Film Festival	Best Cinematography	Milad Partovi	Honorary Diploma	
2025	43rd Fajr International Film Festival	Best Editing	Emad Khodabakhsh	Won	
2025	43rd Fajr International Film Festival	Best Original Score	Christophe Rezai	Nominated	
2025	43rd Fajr International Film Festival	Best Sound	Parviz Abnar	Nominated	
2025	43rd Fajr International Film Festival	Best Makeup	Ehsan Ronasi	Nominated	
2025	43rd Fajr International Film Festival	Best Costume Design	Nazanin Khazaei	Nominated	
2025	43rd Fajr International Film Festival	Best Production Design	Babak Karimi	Nominated	
2025	43rd Fajr International Film Festival	Best First Feature	Seyyed Ali Ahmadi	Nominated	
2025	43rd Fajr International Film Festival	Best First Director	Mahmoud Karimi	Won	
2025	43rd Fajr International Film Festival	Audience Award	Seyyed Ali Ahmadi	Nominated	
