= What's the Time in Your World? =

- Directed by: Safi Yazdanian
- Written by: Safi Yazdanian
- Produced by: Ali Mosaffa
- Starring: Leila Hatami; Ali Mosaffa; Zari Khoshkam; Ebrahim Zamir; Payam Yazdani; Christophe Rezai; Lili Samii; Zeynab Shabani
- Cinematography: Homayoun Payvar
- Edited by: Fardin Saheb-Zamani
- Music by: Christophe Rezai
- Production company: Road Film
- Release date: 2014
- Running time: 100 minutes
- Country: Iran
- Language: Persian

What's the Time in Your World? (Persian: در دنیای تو ساعت چند است؟ / Dar Donya-ye To Saát Chand Ast?) is a 2014 drama film by Safi Yazdanian. The main actors are Ali Mosaffa and Leila Hatami.

== Plot ==
After twenty years in Paris, Gilehgol "Goli" Ebtehaj returns to her hometown near Rasht, leaving her French beau, Antoine, behind. She is greeted by Farhad Yervan, the self-described "Mr. Idiot" painter who claims to know her since long ago. Goli is repulsed by his advances and the fact that he knows so many things about her, while she is distressed that everyone in the town seems to accuse her of missing out her mother, Hava's funeral five years ago. She later recollects that Farhad knew her since at least college times. Interspersed with her story are flashbacks showing that Farhad had made repeated contacts with Hava, from whom he learned about Goli. Hava held Farhad affectionately and lamented Goli's indifference towards him.

Goli begins reconnecting with her old life, including meeting with her college crush, Ali Yaghuti, who is now married with three children, her aunt who lives in Bandar-e Anzali, and tea plantation owner Mr. Najdi, who reveals that he had plans to propose to Hava before he moved overseas. At one point, Goli becomes furious at Farhad due to his repeated advances and lets him get attacked by a mob for harassment, though she later apologizes and invites him to her house. He does so by walking with his head on the streets and carrying a large suitcase; when he arrives, he collapses from dizziness.

As Goli calls him, flashbacks reveal that Farhad had in fact known and fallen in love with Goli since they were children. He observed her mannerisms, her fondness, even her habit of drawing X every time she went to the pier, which is later explained as a way for her to remember a lost lyric for a song. After he wakes up, he shows Goli the contents of the suitcase: all things that she used to hold dear. The two stay together until night, when an exhausted Farhad decides to sleep on a table in the living room, with Goli bidding him good night.

== Cast ==
- Leila Hatami as Goli Ebtehaj
- Ali Mosaffa as Farhad Yervani
- Zari Khoshkam as Hava Mostufi
- Ebrahim Zamir as Mr. Najdi
- Zeynab Shabani as Arash
- Christophe Rezai as Antoine / Monsieur Legrand
- Payam Yazdani as Ali Yaghuti
- Lili Samii as Khaljan

== Awards ==
- Winner FIPRESCI Award 19th Busan International Film Festival
- Winner GOLD FIFOG for Best Film 10th International Oriental Film Festival of Geneva
- Winner Audience Award 5th Iranian Film Festival, Brisbane, Sydney, Canberra, Adelaide, Melbourne, Australia
- Winner Crystal Simorgh for Best Screenplay Fajr International Film Festival
