= Sweet Jam =

Sweet Jam may refer to:

- Sweet Jam (2004 film), a Flemish film
- Sweet Jam (2001 film), an Iranian film
