= Alzheimer (disambiguation) =

Alzheimer may refer to:

- Alzheimer's disease, the most common form of dementia
  - Early-onset Alzheimer's disease, the common dementia diagnosed before the age of 65
- Alois Alzheimer, the neuropathologist and psychiatrist who characterized Alzheimer's disease
- Alzheimer's (film), a 2010 Egyptian film
- Alzheimer (film), a 2011 Iranian film

== See also ==
- Alzheimer's Association (US)
- Alzheimer's Society (UK)
- Alzheimer's Research Trust (UK)
