= The Sealed Secret =

2013 film

The Sealed Secret (Persian: سر به مهر, romanized: Sar Be Mohr) is a 2013 film by the Iranian director Hadi Moghadamdoost. Moghadamdoost also co-wrote the script with Hamid Nematollah and Rouzbeh Raiga. The film starred Khatereh Asadi, Leila Hatami and Arash Majidi.
