= Season Salad =

- Directed by: Fereydoun Jeyrani
- Written by: Fereydoun Jeyrani
- Produced by: Kamaleddin Tabatabai
- Cinematography: Hossein Maleki
- Edited by: Nazanin Mofakham
- Music by: Karen Homayunfar
- Release date: 2005
- Country: Iran
- Language: Persian

Season Salad (Persian: Salad-e fasl) is a 2005 film by the Iranian director Fereydoun Jeyrani. Jeyrani also wrote the script of the film which was lensed by Hossein Maleki. It starred Leila Hatami, Khosro Shakibai and Mohamad Reza Sharifinia in the principal roles. Shakibai was awarded a Crystal Simorgh for his performance in the film
