= Meeting Leila =

- Directed by: Adel Yaraghi
- Written by: Abbas Kiarostami
- Produced by: Adel Yaraghi
- Cinematography: Alireza Barazandeh
- Release date: 2012
- Country: Iran

Meeting Leila (Persian: آشنایی با لیلا, romanized: Ashenayi ba Leila) is a 2012 film by the Iranian actor-director Adel Yaraghi. Yaraghi also produced the movie, co-wrote the script with Abbas Kiarostami, and acted in the film opposite Leila Hatami. It was exhibited at the Chicago International Film Festival where it was nominated for a Golden Hugo.
