= Doubt (2009 film) =

- The theatrical poster
- Directed by: Varuzh Karim Masihi
- Screenplay by: Varuzh Karim Masihi
- Based on: Hamlet by Shakespeare
- Produced by: Saeed Sa'di
- Starring: Bahram Radan; Taraneh Alidoosti; Hamed Komeili; Alireza Shoja Noori; Mahtab Keramati; Kaveh Kavian
- Cinematography: Bahram Badakshani
- Edited by: Varuzh Karim-Masihi
- Music by: Ali Samadpoor
- Release date: 6 February 2009 (FIFF)
- Country: Iran
- Language: Persian

Doubt (Persian: تردید, romanized: Tardid) is a 2009 Iranian Crystal Simorgh-winning film directed by Varuzh Karim Masihi. It is an adaptation of Shakespeare's Hamlet. Made after 17 years, Tardid is Karim Masihi's second feature film after Parde-ye Akhar (The Last Act).

== Plot ==
Siavash Roozbehan is a young man and he has lost his father after his mysterious suicide. His uncle is managing his father's wealth. He is in love with his cousin Mahtab whose father is his uncle's councilor. Siavash gradually realizes that his uncle is going to marry his mother. After some days he also sees a lot of similarities between his own life and of Shakespeare's Hamlet. He goes to Garo, his best friend, and they try to change the end of the tragic story.

== Cast ==
- Note: Because most of main characters in the film have a reference in Hamlet play the names in the parentheses are given for a better understanding of the film plot and are the external reference to Hamlet characters.
- Bahram Radan as Siavash Roozbehan - Hamlet
- Taraneh Alidoosti as Mahtab - Ophelia
- Alireza Shoja Noori as Siavash's uncle - Claudius
- Hamed Komeili as Garo - Horatio
- Mahtab Keramati as Varjavand
- Mohammad Moti' as Anvari - Polonius
- Atash Garakani as Mah Tal'at - Gertrude
- Anoushirvan Arjmand as Khalife
- Farrokh Nemati as Inspector
- Mahmood Pakniat as Uncle Matin
- Kaveh Kavian as Samsami
- Omid Roohani as Dr. Bonyadi

== Awards ==
- Crystal Simorgh for Best Film in 27th Fajr International Film Festival
- Crystal Simorgh for Best Adapted Screenplay in 27th Fajr International Film Festival
