= Leila (1997 film) =

- Directed by: Dariush Mehrjui
- Written by: Dariush Mehrjui, Mahnaz Ansarian
- Produced by: Dariush Mehrjui
- Starring: Leila Hatami; Ali Mosaffa; Jamileh Sheikhi; Mohamad Reza Sharifinia; Turan Mehrzad; Amir Pievar; Shaghayegh Farahani
- Edited by: Mostafa Kherghehpoosh
- Release date: 1997
- Running time: 110 minutes
- Country: Iran
- Language: Persian

Leila (Persian: لیلا, also Romanized as Leyla, Leilā, and Leylā) is a 1997 Iranian film directed by Dariush Mehrjui.

== Plot ==
Leila and Reza are a modern Iranian couple, content with their recent marriage. However, Leila learns that she is unable to conceive. Reza's mother insists that he, as the only son, must have children ("everything goes to the son"), despite Reza's insistence that he does not want children, and suggests that he get a second wife. He adamantly refuses the idea; his mother champions it. Leila gets caught between the two worlds; elated at spending time with Reza one moment and torn apart by his nagging mother the next.
