= The Last Step =

- Theatrical release poster
- Directed by: Ali Mosaffa
- Screenplay by: Ali Mosaffa
- Starring: Leila Hatami; Ali Mosaffa; Alireza Aghakhani; Hamed Behdad
- Cinematography: Alireza Barazandeh
- Edited by: Fardin Saheb Zamani
- Production company: Road Film Production
- Distributed by: Hedayat Film
- Release date: February 11, 2012
- Running time: 88 minutes
- Country: Iran
- Language: Persian

The Last Step (Persian: پله آخر, romanized: Pelle âxar) is Ali Mosaffa's second feature film, following Portrait of a Lady Far Away (2005), featuring Leila Hatami, Ali Mosaffa, and Alireza Aghakhani. The screenplay was partly inspired by Leo Tolstoy's 1886 novella The Death of Ivan Ilyich and James Joyce's short story "The Dead". The film is considered one of the few independently produced features within Iranian cinema and gathered worldwide success after its world premiere at the 47th Karlovy Vary International Film Festival in July, 2012.

== Awards ==
- Best Adapted Screenplay Ali Mosaffa from the 16th Iranian House of Cinema Film Festival, 2014
- FIPRESCI Prize for Best Film, Karlovy Vary International Film Festival 2012
- Crystal Globe Award for Best Actress Leila Hatami, Karlovy Vary International Film Festival 2012
- Crystal Simorgh for Best Adapted Screenplay, Ali Mosaffa, Fajr International Film Festival 2012
- Special Jury Prize at the Kerala International Film Festival 2012
- Award for Best Actor Alireza Aghakhani, Batumi International Art House Film Festival (BIAFF) 2012
- Piuculture Award at the Medfilm International Film Festival 2012

== Reviews ==
- FIPRESCI-Karlovy Vary International Film Festival: Experiment in Narrative: The Last Step
- The Hollywood Reporter: The Last Step: Karlovy Vary Film Review
- IONCINEMA: The Last Step | American Film Institute Festival Review
- American Film Institute Review: A Patchwork of Farce and Tragedy
- SBCC Film Reviews: The Last Step
