= The Deserted Station =

2002 film by Alireza Raisian

- Persian: ایستگاه متروک
- Directed by: Alireza Raisian
- Screenplay by: Kambuzia Partovi
- Story by: Abbas Kiarostami
- Produced by: Hossein Zandbaf
- Starring: Leila Hatami; Nezam Manouchehri; Mehran Rajabi
- Cinematography: Mohammad Aladpoush
- Edited by: Hossein Zandbaf
- Music by: Peyman Yazdanian
- Production company: Farabi Cinema Foundation
- Release dates: 1 February 2002 (FIFF); 13 May 2003 (Iran)
- Running time: 93 minutes
- Country: Iran
- Language: Persian

The Deserted Station (Persian: ایستگاه متروک, romanized: Istgah-e Matrouk) is a 2002 film by the Iranian director Alireza Raisian. It was scripted by Kambuzia Partovi, based on a story by Abbas Kiarostami. Mohammad Aladpoush served as director of photography. The film starred Leila Hatami, Nezam Manouchehri and Mehran Rajabi in the principal roles. Hatami won the Best Actress prize at the Montréal World Film Festival for her performance (co-winner with Maria Bonnevie).

== Critical response ==
On the review aggregator website Rotten Tomatoes, 100% of 20 critics' reviews are positive, with an average rating of 7.8/10. Metacritic, which uses a weighted average, assigned the film a score of 75 out of 100, based on 12 critics, indicating "generally favorable" reviews.
