= Ali Mosaffa =

Iranian actor and director (born 1966)

- علی مصفا
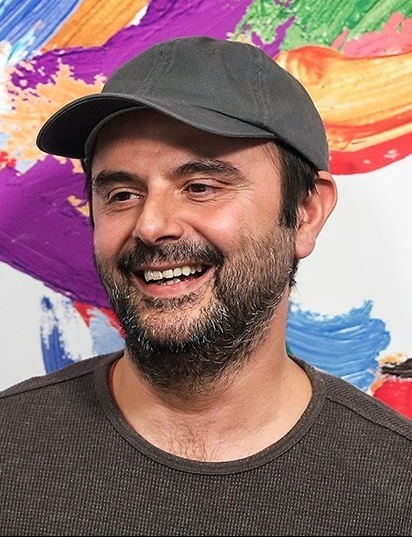
- Ali Mosaffa at the 2019 Fajr Film Festival
- Born: December 1, 1966 (age 59); Tehran, Iran
- Education: University of Tehran
- Occupations: Director, actor, screenwriter
- Years active: 1991–present
- Spouse: Leila Hatami (m. 1998)
- Children: 2
- Parent(s): Mozaher Mosaffa; Amir Banoo Karimi
- Relatives: Seyed Karim Amiri Firuzkuhi (grandfather); Ali Hatami (father-in-law); Zari Khoshkam (mother-in-law)

Ali Mosaffa (Persian: علی مصفا; born December 1, 1966) is an Iranian actor and filmmaker.

== Life and career ==
Mosaffa was born in Tehran, Iran. His father, Mozaher Mosaffa (born in Tafresh), was a Persian poet and professor of Persian literature at the University of Tehran. Mosaffa's mother, Amir Banoo Karimi, is also a leading scholar and professor of Persian literature at the University of Tehran and the eldest daughter of the Persian poet, Seyed Karim Amiri Firuzkuhi.

He is a graduate of Civil engineering from the University of Tehran where he showed an interest in acting; making his debut in the 1991 film, Omid. In the following year he won best male actor at the Fajr International Film Festival for his role in Darius Mehrjui's film, Pari. Mosaffa met his future wife, Iranian actress Leila Hatami on the set of Mehrjui's 1996 film, Leila. The two married in 1999 and have two children, a son named Mani (born February 2007) and a daughter named Assal (born October 2008).

Mosaffa's experience with directing began with the short films, Incubus, The Neighbour and the documentary feature, Farib-e-She'r or The Deceit of Poesy. He then directed his first film in 2005 with Sima-ye Zani Dar Doordast (a.k.a. Portrait of a Lady Far Away), starring Leila Hatami and Homayoun Ershadi. The film was shortlisted for the Sutherland Trophy, at The Times BFI London Film Festival. His first feature film subsequently won the People's Choice Award at the Chicago Iranian Film Festival and was nominated for the Crystal Globe at the 2005 Karlovy Vary International Film Festival. Mosaffa's second film, The Last Step /Pele ye Akhar, starring Leila Hatami has received acclaim from critics and audiences worldwide following its international premiere at the 2012 Karlovy Vary International Film Festival which gained Mosaffa the international critics' FIPRESCI prize for best film and awarded Leila Hatami with the Crystal Globe for Best Actress for her leading role in the film.

In October 2012, Mosaffa joined Oscar-winning director of A Separation, Asghar Farhadi in Paris; starring alongside Bérénice Bejo and Tahar Rahim for Farhadi's first foreign language film, Le Passé or The Past which premiered at the Cannes Film Festival in May 2013.

He started producing films with his own film “ The Last Step” and then produced a second one “ What’s the time in your world” which won the FIPRESCI prize for best film in Bussan 2014. His other productions "A hairy tale", "180 rule" received awards in world festivals. He also coproduced two features with the French : "Yalda, a Night for Forgiveness" won the Grand Jury prize in Sundance Film Festival 2020 and " A Tale of Shemroon" won best feature film in Marakesh IFF 2022.

== Filmography ==
=== Acting ===
- Guardian of the Field by Mohammad Reza Kheradmandan (2025)
- A Minor by Dariush Mehrjui (2022)
- Won't You Cry? by Alireza Motamedi (2022)
- Playing with Stars by Hatef Alimardani (2021)
- A Man Without a Shadow by Alireza Raisian (2019)
- Dance with Me by Soroush Sehhat (2019)
- Orange Days by Arash Lahouti (2018)
- The Second year of my collage by Rasul Sadr Ameli (2018)
- Pig by Mani Haghighi (2018)
- A Bigger Game by Abbas Nezamdoust (2017)
- Inversion by Behnam Behzadi (2016)
- What's the Time in Your World? by Safi Yazdanian (2014)
- Le Passé (The Past) by Asghar Farhadi (2013)
- The Last Step by Ali Mosaffa (2012)
- Beloved Sky by Dariush Mehrjui (2011)
- There Are Things You Don't Know by Fardin Saheb-Zamani (2010)
- Who Killed Amir? by Mehdi Karampoor (2006)
- Another Place by Mehdi Karampoor (2003)
- Mix by Dariush Mehrjui (2001)
- Dear Cousin is Lost by Dariush Mehrjui (2000)
- Party by Saman Moghadam (2000)
- Leila by Dariush Mehrjui (1998)
- Minou Tower by Ebrahim Hatamikia (1996)
- Pari by Dariush Mehrjui (1994)
- All My Daughters by Esmail Soltanian (1992)
- Omid by Habib Kavosh (1991)

=== Directing ===
- Absence (2021) Feature Film
- The Last Step (2012) Feature Film
- Portrait of a Lady Far Away (2005) Feature Film
- Farib-e-She'r or The Deceit of Poesy (1996) Documentary Short Film
- The Neighbor (1999) Short Film
- Incubus (1991) Short Film

=== Television series ===
- The English Bag
- Paridokht

== Producing ==
- The Last Step (2012) Feature Film
- What's the Time in Your World? (2014) Feature Film
- A hairy tale (2019) Feature Film
- Yalda, a Night for Forgiveness (2020) Feature Film
- 180 Rule (2021) Feature Film
- a Tale of Shemroon (2022) Feature Film
- What's Left Behind (2023) Feature Film

== Awards ==
- Diploma of Honor for best actor for Dance with me from Fajr International Film Festival, 2019
- Best Adapted Screenplay for The Last Step from the 16th Iranian House of Cinema Film Festival, 2014
- FIPRESCI International Critics' Prize for The Last Step from the Karlovy Vary International Film Festival, 2012
- Crystal Simorgh for Best Adapted Screenplay for The Last Step from the Fajr International Film Festival, 2012
- Diploma of Honor for best actor for Beloved sky from Fajr International Film Festival, 2011
- Crystal Simorgh for Best Supporting Actor for Pari, from Fajr International Film Festival, 1995
