= Dance with Me (2019 Iranian film) =

- Film poster
- Directed by: Soroush Sehhat
- Written by: Soroush Sehhat; Iman Safaei
- Produced by: Mohammad Reza Takhtkeshian
- Starring: Ali Mosaffa; Pejman Jamshidi; Mehrab GhasemKhani
- Cinematography: Sina Kermanizadeh
- Edited by: Khashayar Movaheddian
- Music by: Maziar Younesi
- Distributed by: Namayesh Gostaran
- Release dates: 21 April 2019 (Fajr International Film Festival); 1 January 2020 (Iran)
- Running time: 93 minutes
- Country: Iran
- Language: Persian
- Box office: 6.7 billion toman (Iran)

Dance with Me (Persian: جهان، با من برقص, romanized: Jahan Ba Man Beraghs) is a 2019 Iranian drama film directed by Soroush Sehhat. It's Sehhat's feature film directorial debut. The film screened for the first time at the 37th Fajr International Film Festival.

== Plot ==
A reunion of old friends for Jahangir's birthday when everyone is informed of his fatal illness - An inevitable confrontation with the current situation and the past - Series of the tensions and the reconciliations leading to a road to the life - however death is knocking on the door.

== Cast ==
- Ali Mosaffa as Jahangir
- Javad Ezzati as Ehsan
- Hanieh Tavassoli as Nahid
- Pejman Jamshidi as Reza
- Siavash Cheraghipour as Hamid
- Kazem Sayahi as Bahman
- Mehrab Ghasemkhani as Ali
- Bahar Katuzi as Niloufar
- Ramin Sadighi as Faragh
- Pavan Afsar as Nasim
- Shiva Baluchi as Asa
- Mahyar Pourbabaei as Shayan

== Reception ==
=== Accolades ===
Year	Award	Category	Recipient	Result
2019	Fajr International Film Festival	Best Director	Soroush Sehhat	Won
2019	Fajr International Film Festival	Best Actor	Ali Mosaffa	Diploma Honorary
2020	Hafez Awards	Best Film	Dance with Me	Nominated
2020	Hafez Awards	Best Screenplay	Soroush Sehhat & Iman Safaei	Nominated
2020	Hafez Awards	Abbas Kiarostami Memorial Medal	Soroush Sehhat	Nominated
2022	1st Iranian Cinema Directors' Great Celebration	Best New Film Director	Soroush Sehat	Nominated
