= There Are Things You Don't Know =

- Theatrical release poster
- Directed by: Fardin Saheb-Zamani
- Written by: Fardin Saheb-Zamani, Payam Yazdani
- Produced by: Manijeh Hekmat
- Starring: Ali Mosaffa; Leila Hatami; Mahtab Keramati
- Cinematography: Hooman Behmanesh
- Edited by: Fardin Saheb-Zamani
- Music by: Amir Ali Vadjed Samiei
- Production company: Documentary & Experimental Film Center
- Distributed by: Iranian Independents
- Release date: July 6, 2010 (Karlovy Vary Film Festival)
- Running time: 92 minutes
- Country: Iran
- Language: Persian

There Are Things You Don't Know is a 2010 film starring Ali Mosaffa, Leila Hatami, and Mahtab Keramati. The movie was directed by Fardin Saheb-Zamani, and the screenplay was written by Fardin Saheb-Zamani and Payam Yazdani.

== Plot ==
The film tells the story of a reclusive taxi driver in Tehran in the days leading up to an earthquake. He has chosen to distance himself from society and to be passive so as not to be hurt. Finally one of his passengers gives him enough motivation to act and bring about a change in his life.

== Cast ==
Ali Mosaffa

Leila Hatami

Mahtab Keramati

Mona Mostofi

Nasim Amir Khosro

Mehdi Agahi

Siamak Adib, Mohamad Nazimi Arani, Mostafa Sasani, Soren Menatsakian, Vahid Hasanzadeh, Farnaz Rahnema, Mohamad Rabbanipour, Mehdi Bajestani, Payam Yazdani, Mhdieh Mir Habibi, Maral Irandoost, Hesam Nourani, Effat Rasoulinejad, Mitra Moradi, Karina Nazarava

== Awards ==
- Special Jury Mention, Karlovy Vary International Film Festival, 2010.
