= A Tale of Shemroon =

- Directed by: Emad Aleebrahim Dehkordi
- Written by: Emad Aleebrahim Dehkordi
- Starring: Iman Sayad Borhani; Payar Allahyari; Masoumeh Beygi; Behzad Dorani
- Cinematography: Amin Jafari
- Edited by: Félix Rehm
- Production companies: Indie Prod; UProduction; 2 Pilots Filmproduction; Ali Mosaffa Productions; Bibi Film TV; Take Shelter
- Distributed by: Jour2Fête (France)
- Release date: September 2022
- Running time: 102 minutes
- Countries: France; Germany; Italy; Iran
- Languages: Persian; French

A Tale of Shemroon (French: Chevalier noir) is a 2022 drama film written and directed by Iranian filmmaker Emad Aleebrahim Dehkordi in his feature directorial debut. A co-production between France, Germany, Italy and Iran, the film stars Iman Sayad Borhani, Payar Allahyari, Masoumeh Beygi and Behzad Dorani.

Set in Shemroon, in northern Tehran, the film follows two brothers, Iman and Payar, whose lives are upended after the death of their mother when Iman becomes involved in a scheme connected to Tehran's wealthy youth.

The film had its world premiere in the New Directors section of the 70th San Sebastián International Film Festival in September 2022. It later won the Étoile d'Or, the top prize of the Marrakech International Film Festival, and the Grand Jury Prize for European Feature Films at the Premiers Plans Festival.

== Plot ==
Iman and his younger brother Payar live with their father in Shemroon, an affluent district in northern Tehran. Their mother has recently died, leaving the family struggling with grief and instability.

Iman, restless and eager to escape his circumstances, uses his connections among Tehran's wealthy young people to enter a small-scale illegal business in hopes of making quick money. Payar, who has a quieter temperament, concentrates on his ambitions as a boxer.

What initially appears to Iman to be an opportunity for financial independence gradually draws the brothers and their family into a cycle of increasingly serious consequences.

== Cast ==
- Iman Sayad Borhani as Iman
- Payar Allahyari as Payar
- Masoumeh Beygi as Hanna
- Behzad Dorani as the father
- Nima Nouri Zadeh
- Mehdi Ansari
- Aisan Ghanbari

== Production ==
A Tale of Shemroon is the first feature film directed by Emad Aleebrahim Dehkordi. Before making the film, Dehkordi had directed the short films Lower Heaven (2017) and Cavalière (2020).

The screenplay, then known by its French title Chevalier noir, was developed at the Ateliers d'Angers programme in 2018.

The film was produced as an international co-production involving Indie Prod and UProduction of France, 2 Pilots Filmproduction of Germany, Bibi Film TV of Italy, Ali Mosaffa Productions of Iran and the French company Take Shelter.

Amin Jafari served as cinematographer and Félix Rehm edited the film. Vahid Moghaddasi, Olivier Voisin and Romain Ozanne worked on its sound.

The film was shot during the COVID-19 pandemic. In an interview conducted at the San Sebastián Film Festival, Dehkordi said that the project had taken roughly ten years to reach the screen.

== Release ==
A Tale of Shemroon premiered in the New Directors competition at the 70th San Sebastián International Film Festival in September 2022. The festival listed it as a French–German–Italian–Iranian production with a running time of 102 minutes and dialogue in Persian and French.

The film subsequently screened in competition at the Marrakech International Film Festival in November 2022.

Jour2Fête released the film theatrically in France under the title Chevalier noir on 22 February 2023. Indie Sales handled international sales.

== Reception ==
=== Critical response ===
Elena Lazic of Cineuropa described the film as a mature examination of contemporary Iranian society and the limited choices available to its younger generation. She praised Dehkordi's non-judgmental treatment of the two brothers and highlighted the performances of Iman Sayad Borhani and Masoumeh Beygi, while finding the film's climactic convergence of its storylines somewhat less convincing than its earlier observational passages.

Amber Wilkinson of Eye for Film praised the film's portrayal of the relationship between the brothers and Dehkordi's visual instincts, particularly several sequences set on Tehran's roads at night. She was more critical of the number of narrative strands, which she felt left some characters and ideas underdeveloped.

Jo-Ann Titmarsh of HeyUGuys called the film an intelligent and thought-provoking portrayal of young people living under political and social pressure in Iran, and singled out Borhani's central performance for particular praise.

=== Accolades ===
At the 19th Marrakech International Film Festival, the jury chaired by Paolo Sorrentino awarded A Tale of Shemroon the Étoile d'Or, the festival's Grand Prize. Screen International reported that Dehkordi dedicated the award to Iranians struggling for freedom amid the political unrest in the country at the time.

The film later received the Grand Jury Prize for European Feature Films at the Premiers Plans Festival in Angers.

== Accolades ==
Year	Award	Category	Nominee	Result
2022	Marrakech International Film Festival	Étoile d'Or	A Tale of Shemroon	Won
2023	Premiers Plans Festival	Grand Jury Prize – European Feature Films	A Tale of Shemroon	Won
