= Fereydoun Najafi =

Iranian film director and screenwriter

- فریدون نجفی‌
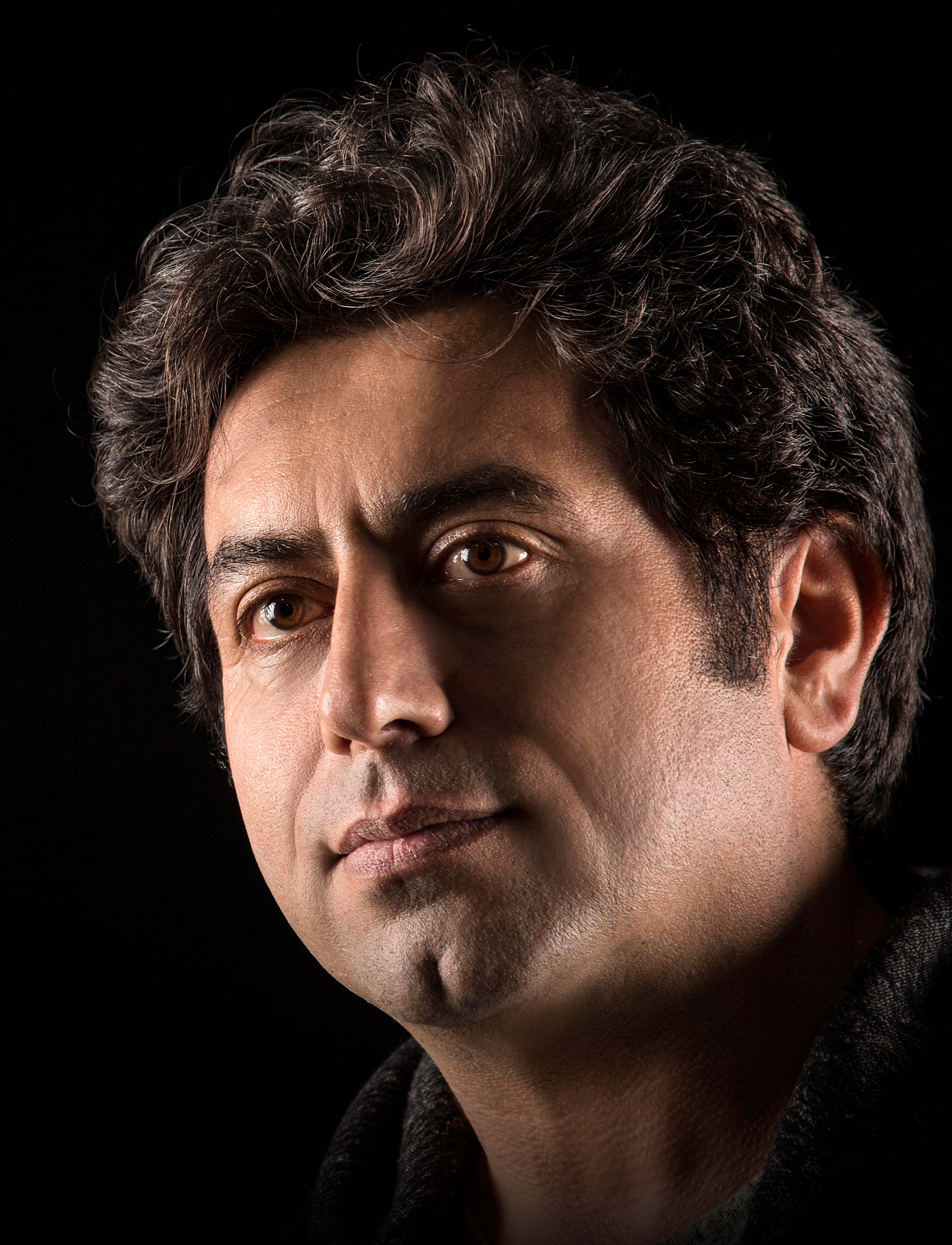
- Born: November 7, 1977 (age 49); Kuhrang County, Iran
- Education: University of Art
- Occupations: Film director producer writer
- Years active: 1997-present

Fereydoun Najafi (born 7 November 1977 in Kuhrang County) is an Iranian film director and screenwriter. He graduated in cinema, with a specialization in directing, from the University of Art and is a member of the Asia Pacific Screen Academy in Australia. Many of his narrative and documentary works have received recognition at prominent national and international film festivals and have won numerous awards.

== Filmography ==
He has directed the films Olympics in Shalamzar, Khatun, Yarda, Road and Star, Where Is Fatemeh’s House?, The Twelfth Man, Khorousak, The Song of Rain, Elog, the documentary series Hamdorang, The Legend of Mah-Titi, and the documentary The Last Migration,as well as the feature films The Skier and Wolf Cubs of the Apple Valley.

Najafi’s first feature film, The Skier, received seven Golden Butterflies in the International and Iranian Cinema sections and was selected as the best film of the 30th International Children and Young Adults Film Festival.

=== Movie ===
Year	Film	Producer	Director	Writer	Awards
2024	Khati	Mohammad Kamalipour	Yes	Ahmad Rafizadeh	The film was selected for the competition section of the 43rd Fajr Film Festival and received the Best Feature Film Award from the Department of Environment in the National Will section.
2019	Wolf Cubs of the Apple Valley	Majid Barzegar	Yes	Yes	Best Film at the 33rd International Children and Young Adults Film Festival; winner of four Golden Butterflies, Best Screenplay, Best Actor, Best Film and the Special Jury Award in the international jury section; Best Children's and Young Adults Film at the San Francisco Iranian Film Festival; and the Special Jury Award at the Sharjah International Film Festival.
2017	The Skier	Mohammad Ahmadi	Yes	Yes	Best Film at the 30th International Children and Young Adults Film Festival; winner of seven Golden Butterflies; Best Film at the Olympia International Film Festival of Greece; Best Film at the Zanzibar International Film Festival of Tanzania; Best Screenplay at the 12th Sports Film Festival; nominated for the Grand Prize of the Asia Pacific Screen Academy of Australia; and nominated for Best Film at the Sharjah International Film Festival.
2025	The wolf’s fur	Amirhossein Alamolhoda	Yes	Yes	The film received the Special Peace Award and an honorary diploma for Best Young Actor at the 37th International Film Festival for Children and Young Adults in Isfahan.
2025	Girls of the Wind	Mohammad Ahmadi	Yes	Yes	
2026	Bride of the Spring	Fereydoun Najafi	Yes	Yes	

=== Short Film ===
Year	Film	Producer	Director	Awards
2008	Where Is Fatemeh's House?	Fereydoun Najafi	Yes	Crystal Simorgh for Best Short Film at the 27th Fajr Film Festival; Golden Butterfly for Best Short Film at the International Film Festival for Children and Young Adults; Best Film at the Al-Ghadir International Film Festival in Iraq; Best Film at the Hozeh Honari National Production Festival; Best Film at the Rahmat International Film Festival; nominated for the Crystal Bear at the Berlin International Film Festival.
2010	The Twelfth Man	Documentary and Experimental Film Center	Yes	Golden Butterfly for Best Director and Golden Butterfly for Best Actor at the International Film Festival for Children and Young Adults; Best Screenplay and the Special Jury Award at the Tehran International Short Film Festival; Best Film at the Roshd International Film Festival
2011	Khorousak	Fereydoun Najafi	Yes	Golden Butterfly for Best Film at the International Film Festival for Children and Young Adults; Best Film at the Lucania International Film Festival in Italy; Best Child Actor at the Ruyesh Film Festival

=== Documentary Film ===
Year	Film	Producer	Director	Awards
2008	Where Is Fatemeh's House?	Fereydoun Najafi	Yes	Crystal Simorgh for Best Short Film at the 27th Fajr Film Festival; Golden Butterfly for Best Short Film at the International Film Festival for Children and Young Adults; Best Film at the Al-Ghadir International Film Festival in Iraq; Best Film at the Hozeh Honari National Production Festival; Best Film at the Rahmat International Film Festival; nominated for the Crystal Bear at the Berlin International Film Festival.
2010	The Twelfth Man	Documentary and Experimental Film Center	Yes	Golden Butterfly for Best Director and Golden Butterfly for Best Actor at the International Film Festival for Children and Young Adults; Best Screenplay and the Special Jury Award at the Tehran International Short Film Festival; Best Film at the Roshd International Film Festival
2011	Khorousak	Fereydoun Najafi	Yes	Golden Butterfly for Best Film at the International Film Festival for Children and Young Adults; Best Film at the Lucania International Film Festival in Italy; Best Child Actor at the Ruyesh Film Festival

== Awards ==
Fereydoun Najafi has received more than 40 awards from national and international film festivals and has participated in more than 100 national and international events, including:

- Crystal Simorgh for Best Short Film at the 27th Fajr International Film Festival
- Golden Butterfly, Diploma of Honor, and the Special Jury Award in the international section at the 33rd International Children and Adolescents Film Festival for directing The Apple Valley Wolf Cubs
- Golden Butterfly, Diploma of Honor, and Best Screenplay Award at the 33rd International Children and Adolescents Film Festival for The Apple Valley Wolf Cubs
- Golden Butterfly, Diploma of Honor, Best Director, and Best Film (international section) at the 30th International Children and Adolescents Film Festival for The Skier
- Golden Butterfly, Diploma of Honor, Best Director, and Best Film (Iranian cinema section) at the 30th International Children and Adolescents Film Festival for The Skier
- Best Feature Film Award at the 21st Olympia International Film Festival in Greece in 2019 for The Skier
- Silver Dhow Award for Best Film at the 22nd Zanzibar International Film Festival in Tanzania in 2019 for The Skier
- Golden Butterfly, Diploma of Honor, and Best Director Award at the 22nd International Children and Adolescents Film Festival for Where Is Fatemeh's House?
- Golden Butterfly, Diploma of Honor, and Best Director Award at the 24th International Children and Adolescents Film Festival for The Twelfth Man
- Golden Butterfly, Diploma of Honor, and Best Director Award at the 26th International Children and Adolescents Film Festival for Khoroosak
- Best Narrative Film, as selected by the student jury, at the 27th Tehran International Short Film Festival
- Diploma of Honor and Best Film Award at the 41st Roshd International Film Festival
- Diploma of Honor and Best Film Award from the jury of the Iranian Short Film Association (House of Cinema) at the 26th International Children and Adolescents Film Festival
- Firoozeh statuette, Diploma of Honor, and Best Film Award at the 6th Cinema Vérité International Documentary Film Festival for The Early Migration
- Diploma of Honor and Best Short Film Award at the Cinema Vérité International Documentary Film Festival for Dokhtar Bas
- Festival statuette, Diploma of Honor, and Best Screenplay Award at the National Student Film, Screenplay and Photography Festival of University of Tehran
- Festival statuette, Diploma of Honor, and Best 135 Film Award at the 4th Kosar Film Festival in Tehran
- Festival statuette and Best Film Award at the 2014 SWIFF International Film Festival in London
- Festival statuette and Best Film Award at the 13th Lucania International Film Festival in Italy
- Festival statuette and Best Film Award at the 5th Al-Ghadir International Film Festival in Iraq
- Festival statuette, Diploma of Honor, and Best Director Award at the 4th Ruyesh National Film Festival
- Festival statuette, Diploma of Honor, and Best Film Award at the Rahmat International Film Festival
- Festival statuette, Diploma of Honor, and Best Director Award at the Rahmat Film Festival
- Parvaz statuette, Diploma of Honor, and Best Film Award at the 2nd National Artistic Center Productions Festival in Tehran
- Festival statuette, Diploma of Honor, and Best Director Award at the 5th Shahid Avini National Media Festival
- Festival statuette, Diploma of Honor, and Special Jury Award for Best Director at the Rahbaran National Film Festival in Tehran
- Festival statuette, Diploma of Honor, and Best Film Music Award at the 17th Islamic Republic of Iran Broadcasting Centers Productions Festival
- Festival statuette, Diploma of Honor, and Best Director Award at the Bam-e Iran Film Festival

Najafi has also participated in the competitive sections of several other international festivals, including the 61st Berlin International Film Festival, the Montreal World Film Festival in Canada, the Asia Pacific Screen Awards in Australia, the Thessaloniki Film Festival in Greece, Religion Today Film Festival in Italy, Cambridge International Film Festival in England, Al Jazeera Documentary Film Festival in Doha, the BFI London Film Festival, Filmini Film Festival in Bulgaria, Lucania in Italy, the Children and Adolescents Film Festival of India, the Universal Kids World Festival in Turkey, the Olympia International Film Festival in Greece, the Sharjah International Film Festival in the United Arab Emirates, the Beirut International Film Festival, the Ireland Film Festival, the Milan International Sports Film Festival in Italy, and the Carthage Film Festival in Tunisia, among others, where his films were selected for competition and nominated for several awards.
