= Imagine (2022 film) =

- تصور
- Directed by: Ali Behrad
- Written by: Ali Behrad
- Produced by: Javad Norouzbeigi
- Starring: Leila Hatami; Mehrdad Sedighian; Sama Savaar; Hadi Ahmadi; Mohammad Khaksari
- Cinematography: Alireza Barazandeh
- Edited by: Emad Khodabakhsh
- Music by: Alireza Afkari
- Distributed by: Khaneh Film
- Release date: 23 May 2022 (Cannes Film Festival)
- Running time: 77 minutes
- Country: Iran
- Language: Persian
- Box office: 1,704,876,000 Toman

Imagine (Persian: تصور) is a 2022 Iranian drama and romantic film directed and written by Ali Behrad, and produced by Javad Norouzbeigi. The original title of the film was Herman, and it was filmed from March 2021 to April 2021. The main actors in the film are Leila Hatami and Mehrdad Sedighian.

== Plot ==
Imagine tells the story of a young taxi driver, set in a fantasy and dreamlike atmosphere, who picks up women with similar faces every night and listens to their stories. The young man falls in love with a woman who is a baker but is unable to express his love to her. Therefore, he starts fantasizing about her, creating empty spaces in the narrative that the audience is responsible for filling in.

== Festivals ==
Imagine was one of the seven films selected to compete in the International Critics' Week at the Cannes Film Festival 2022. It was also shown at the Kabourg Film Festival, the Edinburgh International Film Festival, the Bucharest Film Festival, and the Jakarta World Cinema Week.
