= Hamed Komaily =

Iranian actor

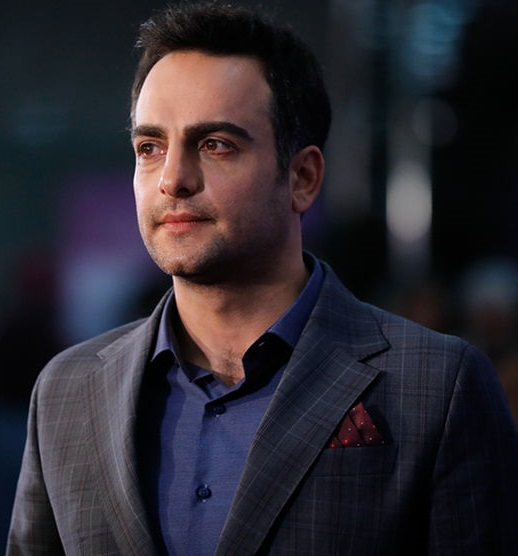
- Komaily at the 2019 Fajr Film Festival
- Born: 5 July 1982 (age 44); Isfahan, Iran
- Occupation: Actor
- Years active: 2006–present

Hamed Komaily (Persian: حامد کمیلی; born 5 July 1982) is an Iranian actor. He is best known for his role in Eve's Daughter, Adam's Son (2010).

== Career ==
He graduated with a Bachelor of Business Administration and as a computer technician. He has been acting in theater for 10 years. He started his first play, in Isfahan (Iran).

He was nominated for (Tardid _ varojh karim masihi) in the International Fajr Film festival.

== Personal life ==
Hamed Komeili holds a master's degree in business administration and an associate degree in computer science. He initially pursued theater in his hometown of Isfahan and later continued his acting journey in Tehran, where he trained under prominent theater figures such as Fereydoun Khosravi and Golab Adineh. Outside of acting, Komeili has a passion for music and plays both the piano and tar. He has mentioned that Hamed Behdad has greatly influenced his artistic path, inspiring him to develop a unique approach to acting in cinema.

== Filmography ==
=== Film ===
| Year | Title | Role | Director |
|---|---|---|---|
| 2009 | Doubt | Karo | Varuzh Karim Masihi |
| 2010 | Whatever God Wants | Vandad | Navid Mihandoost |
| 2010 | 2 Sisters | Jalal | Mohammad Banki |
| 2010 | Son of Adam, Daughter of Eve | Farhood | Rambod Javan |
| 2011 | The Swallows In Love | Mansour | Ferial Behzad |
| 2017 | Italy Italy | Nader | Kaveh Sabaghzadeh |
| 2017 | Gilda | Rouzbeh | Keyvan Alimohammadi, Omid Bonakdar |
| 2019 | Jamshidieh | Amir | Yalda Jebeli |
| 2019 | Tuneless Instruments | Parsa | Ali Hazrati |
| 2020 | The Good, the Bad, the Corny 2: Secret Army | Farbod Molavian | Peyman Ghasem Khani |
| 2020 | Shahre Gheseh Cinema | | Keyvan Alimohammadi, Aliakbar Heydari |
| 2022 | 2888 | | Keyvan Alimohammadi, Aliakbar Heydari |
| 2023 | Sima's Unfinished Narration | | Alireza Samadi |
| 2023 | Gazelle | | Houshang Golmakani |
| 2023 | Hedgehog | | Mastaneh Mohajer |

=== Web ===
| Year | Title | Role | Director | Platform |
|---|---|---|---|---|
| 2019 | Dance On the Glass | Siavash Namdar | Mehdi Golestaneh | Video CD |
| 2021 | The Good, The Bad, The Corney: Radioactive | Farbod Molavian | Mohsen Chegini | Filimo |
| 2021 | His Majesty | Naser al-Din Shah Qajar | Hamed Mohammadi | Filimo |
| 2023 | The Marsh | Sadra Fathi | Borzou Niknejad | Filmnet |
| TBA | One Way Ticket | | Pouria Heidary Oureh | |

=== Television ===
| Year | Title | Role | Director | Network |
|---|---|---|---|---|
| 2008 | SMS From Another World | Hamed Simkhah | Sirous Moghaddam | IRIB TV1 |

== See also ==
- Iranian cinema
