= Subdued =

2017 Iranian romantic drama film directed by Hamid Nematollah

- Persian: رگ خواب
- Directed by: Hamid Nematollah
- Written by: Masoumeh Bayat
- Produced by: Hamid Nematollah
- Starring: Leila Hatami; Koroush Tahami; Elham Korda; Leila Moosavi
- Cinematography: Farshad Mohammadi
- Edited by: Mehdi Sa'di
- Music by: Sohrab Pournazeri; Homayoun Shajarian
- Release dates: February 1, 2017 (Fajr Film Festival); June 17, 2017 (Iran)
- Running time: 103 minutes
- Country: Iran
- Language: Persian
- Box office: 4.3 billion Iranian tomans

Subdued (Persian: رگ خواب, Rag-e Khāb, lit. 'Weak Spot') is a 2017 Iranian romantic drama film directed by Hamid Nematollah and written by Masoumeh Bayat. The film stars Leila Hatami, Koroush Tahami, Elham Korda, and Leila Moosavi.

== Cast ==
- Leila Hatami as Mina
- Koroush Tahami as Kamran
- Elham Korda as Ayla
- Leila Moosavi as Mrs. Mansouri
- Khosrow Bamdad as Mina's father
- Asghar Piran as Kamran's labor
- Ghezaleh Jezayeri as fast food cashier
- Behzad Rahimkhani as dentist
- Hojjat Hassanpour as Mojtaba
- Bamdad Nematollah as Ayla's son
- Azita Lachini as hospital owner
