= Ali Hatami =

Iranian film director (1944–1996)

- علی حاتمی
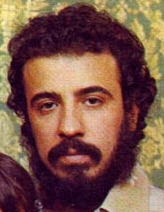
- Born: Ali Hatami; 14 August 1944; Tehran, Imperial State of Iran
- Died: 7 December 1996 (aged 52); Tehran, Iran
- Occupations: Director, screenwriter, art director, costume designer
- Years active: 1969–1996
- Spouse: Zari Khoshkam (m. 1971)
- Children: Leila
- Relatives: Ali Mosaffa (son-in-law)

Ali Hatami (Persian: علی حاتمی; 14 August 1944 – 7 December 1996) was an Iranian film director, screenwriter, art director, and costume designer. The Tehran Times dubbed him "the Hafez of Iranian cinema due to the poetic ambiance of his movies."

== Career ==
Hatami graduated from the College of Dramatic Arts in Iran and subsequently began his professional career as a writer.

He made his feature film directorial debut with Hasan Kachal (Hasan the Bald) in 1970, which was the first Iranian musical film. He wrote and directed several films that focused on Iranian culture, including Hajji Washington (1982), Kamalolmolk (1984), and Love Stricken (1992). The Tehran Times dubbed him "the Hafez of Iranian cinema due to the poetic ambiance of his movies."

Hatami was also known for directing television series; he established a small production village—the Ghazali Cinema Town—to function as a set for historical productions, which he ultimately used to produce the popular television series Hezar Dastan (1978 to 1987). In 2006, Hezar Dastan was voted by the Association of Iranian Film and Television Critics as the best Iranian television series ever made.

Although his films did not attract international attention, the Iranian audience praised him. He often worked as the art director and costume designer of his own films.

He was honoured in 2017 as the subject of the poster for the 35th Fajr International Film Festival.

== Death ==
Hatami's last film remained incomplete because of his death due to cancer, on 7 December 1996, in Tehran.

His Tombstone in Tehran's Behesht-e Zahra Cemetery says in Persian: "Aein Cheragh Khamooshi Nist" (It is not the nature of light to be dark).

== Personal life ==
His parents were from Tafresh. He was married to Iranian actress Zari Khoshkam. Their daughter, Leila Hatami, also an actress, starred in the Academy Award-winning film A Separation.

== Films ==
- Hasan Kachal (1970)
- Wood Pigeon (Toghi) (1970)
- Baba Shamal (1971)
- Sattar Khan (1972)
- Ghalandar (1972)
- Khastegar (1972)
- Sooteh-Delan (1977)
- Hajji Washington (1982)
- Kamalolmolk (1984)
- Jafar Khan Is Back from the West (1985)
- Mother (1989)
- Del Shodegan (1992)
- Komiteh Mojazat (1997)
- Takhti (1997)
- Tehran Roozegare No (2008)

== Television series ==
- Rumi Story (1972)
- Soltan-e Sahebgharan (1974)
- Hezar Dastan (1978–1987)
