= Faramarz Sedighi =

Iranian Actor

- فرامرز صدیقی
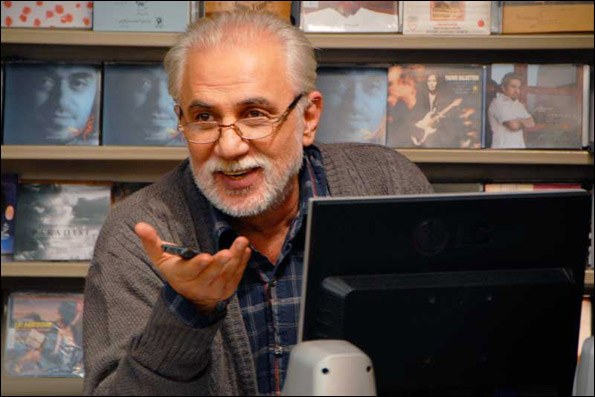
- Born: Faramarz Sedighi; November 11, 1949 (age 76); Saqqez, Iran
- Education: University of Tehran
- Occupations: Actor; film producer
- Years active: 1969–2010
- Awards: 9th Fajr International Film Festival Crystal Simorgh for Best Actor in 1991

Faramarz Sedighi (Persian: فرامرز صدیقی;born 11 November 1949) is an Iranian actor and assistant director. He is a theater graduate of the Faculty of Fine Arts, University of Tehran. Sedighi started his professional career in 1969 with acting in "Rostam and Sohrab" theaters. He experienced his cinematic activity in 1972 with his role in the film "Cheshmeh" (Fountain) directed by Arbi Evansian. He became famous with his film "Naked to Noon with Speed" (1972) and his outstanding works include Snake Fang (1989) and "Blade and Silk" (1985).

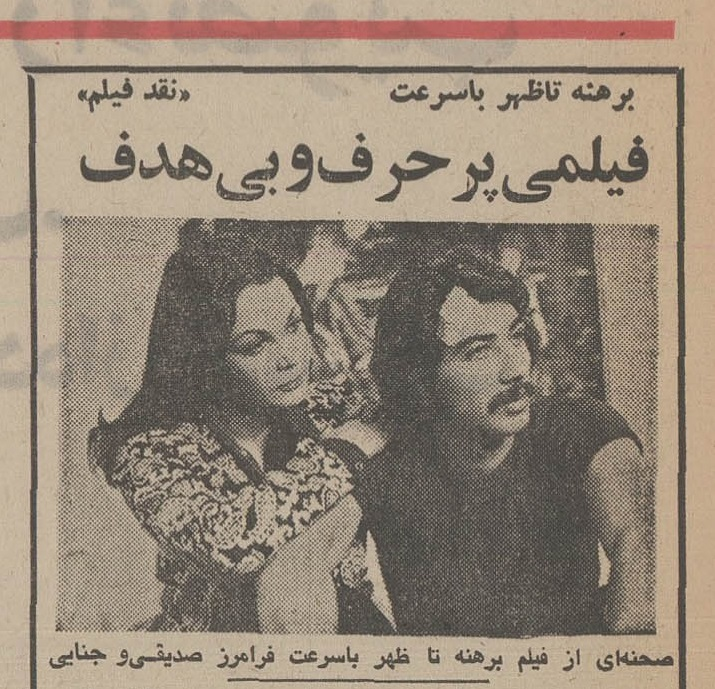
Fereshteh Jenabi and Faramarz Sedighi in the movie "Naked to Noon with Speed", Sepid va Siah Magazine, July 1974

== ‌‌Biography ==
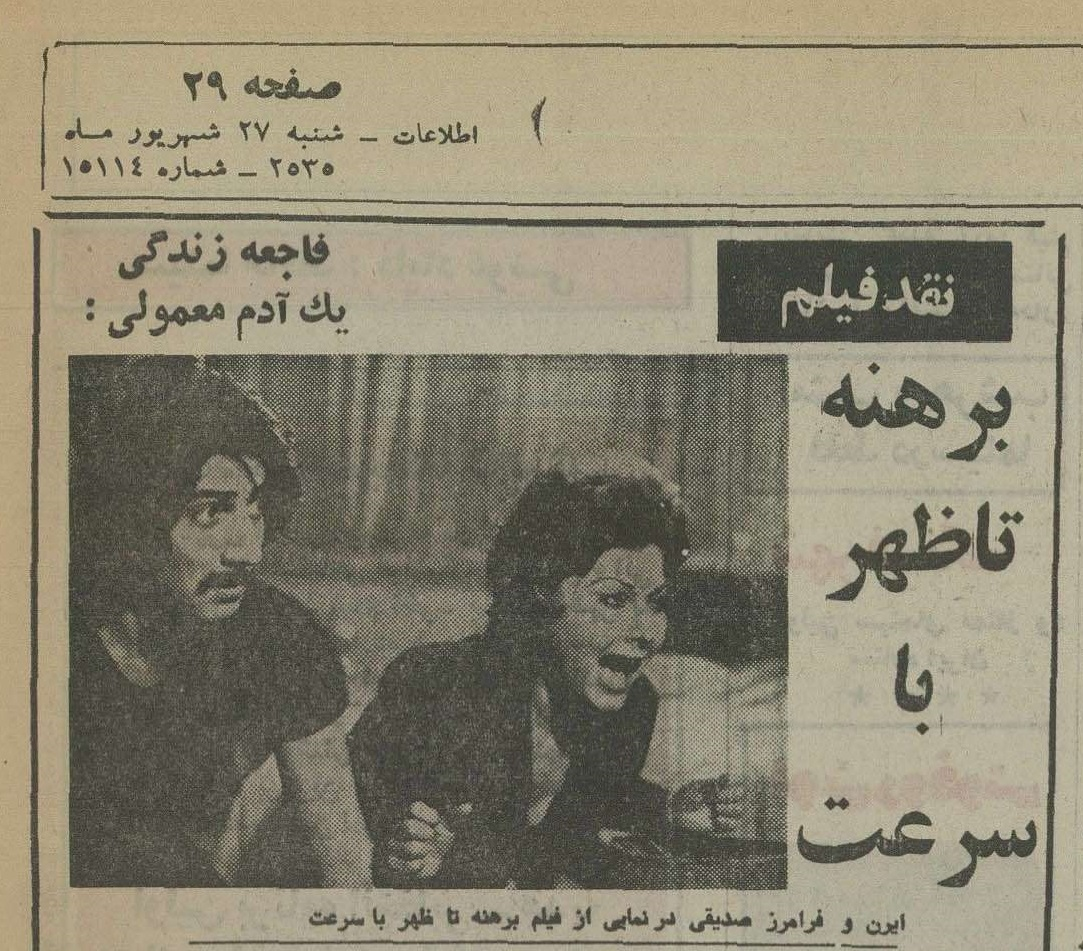
Another photo of Sedighi in the movie "Naked to Noon with Speed", Ettela'at Newspaper, 1976

Faramarz Sedighi was born in Saqqez to an ethnic Kurdish family. He lived and studied in Saqqez until he was 17, when he moved to Tehran after being accepted to the University of Tehran in 1967 when he was 18 years old. He starred in several movies before the Iranian revolution in 1979. The film "The Virgin Woman" was one of the famous films in 1973, which starred alongside Morteza Aghili and Mehdi Fakhimzadeh. After the revolution in 1980, he made his first film. The film "Said all three of them", directed by Gholam-Ali Erfan, were his first professional activities after the revolution and played alongside Saeed Amir Soleimani, Jamshid Mashayekhi and Homayoun Asadian. His other films include Snake Fang, "The Last Flight", Love-stricken, and "The Prosecutor". Sedighi started working as a theater teacher before the Iranian revolution, and one of his most famous students was Mehraneh Mahin Torabi In 1992, Faramarz Sedighi made a screenplay and directed the movie "The Bait" with the presence of Jamshid Hashempour and Reza Rooygari. The last film in which this actor played a role is "Khak va Atash" (Soil and fire), produced in 2010. According to some of his colleagues, Sedighi chose to withdraw in the 1990s, and according to Parviz Parastui, who first published Sedighi's controversial photo, he did not even open his home door on the production cast when they followed him for the 2016 film "The Domestic Killer", directed by Masoud Kimiai According to his relatives explanations, Faramarz Sedighi has developed Alzheimer's disease in recent years.

== Filmography ==
=== Movies ===
Movie Name	Year	Role
The Bait	1992	writer and director
Soil and Fire	2010	Actor
Son of Adam, Daughter of Eve	2010	Actor
Ghadmagah	2003	Actor
Maral	2000	Actor
A Thousands Women like Me	2000	Actor
Love is not enough	1998	Actor
The Love Squadrons	1997	Actor
Long Autumn	1993	Actor
Attorney General	1991	Actor
Love-stricken	1991	Actor
Last Flight	1989	Actor
Snake Fang	1989	Actor
Lost Time	1989	Actor
The Aperture	1988	Actor
Shadows of Sorrow	1987	Actor
The Blade and The Silk	1985	Actor
Said all three of them	1980	Actor
Tonight a Tear Is fallen	1980	Actor
Naked until noon with speed	1976	Actor
Female Virgin	1973	Actor
Cheshmeh	1972	Actor

=== TV Series ===
TV Series Name	Director	Year
Long Autumn	Manouchehr Asgari Nasab	1994
Attacker	Jafar Simaei	1995
Silent shout	Jahangir Jahangiri	1996
Eagle Day	Seyed Mohammad Reza Mofidi	1998
Station	Manouchehr Asgari Nasab	1999
Only in the dark	Massoud Rashidi	1999
The story of a city	Asghar Farhadi	1999
lights off	Kazem Baluchi	2000
Lost	Young Rambod	2001
Sheriff		2003
White Papers	Shafi Agha Mohammadian	2003
Hengameh	Majid Javanmard	2003
Little Men	Akbar Mansour Fallah	2003
Until sunset	Mohammad Banai	2004
Circle of Doubt	Amir Ghavidel	2004
Golrizan	Masoud Rashidi	2004
Destiny	Mohammad Reza Zehtabi	2007
