= Son of Adam, Daughter of Eve =

2010 Iranian romantic comedy film

- Persian: پسر آدم، دختر حوا
- Directed by: Rambod Javan
- Written by: Saeed Hajimiri
- Produced by: Saeed Hajimiri
- Starring: Hamed Komaily; Mahnaz Afshar; Rambod Javan; Shila Khodadad; Leila Otadi; Faramarz Sedighi
- Cinematography: Faraj Heidari; Alireza Zarrindast
- Edited by: Saeed Hajimiri
- Music by: Behnam Abtahi
- Distributed by: TDH Home Entertainment
- Release date: 14 July 2010
- Running time: 112 Min
- Country: Iran
- Language: Persian

Son of Adam, Daughter of Eve (Persian: پسر آدم، دختر حوا ; Pesare Adam Dokhtare Hava) is a 2010 Iranian romantic comedy film directed by Rambod Javan.

== Plot ==
Farhood (Hamed Komaily) and Mina (Mahnaz Afshar), two young lawyers, compete to take over a business office that was fraudulently given to them. Meanwhile, Naser (Rambod Javan) and Mahboobeh (Shila Khodadad) want to separate. Farhood and Mina accept the two's representation, and their rivalry enters a new round.

== Cast ==
- Hamed Komaily
- Mahnaz Afshar
- Rambod Javan
- Shila Khodadad
- Leila Otadi
- Faramarz Sedighi
- Kiumars Malekmotei
- Hossein Moheb Ahari
- Mahmoud Banafshehkhah
- Saeid Pirdoost
- Mohsen Ghazi Moradi
- Mahvash Vaghari
- Malakeh Ranjbar
- Kianush Gerami
- Alireza Riahi
