= Bride of the Spring =

- Directed by: Fereydoun Najafi
- Screenplay by: Fereydoun Najafi: Sima Tajdini; Arian Rezaei; Alireza Ghasemi; Hamidreza Khatiri
- Produced by: Fereydoun Najafi
- Starring: Elnaz Shakerdoost: Mohammad Bahrani; Danial Jafari; Niusha Ahmadi; Fatemeh Bahrani; Louza Raeisi; Ammar Seyyed-Mohseni; Pouya Cheheltanan; Arsin Moafpourian; Homayoun Barzegar; Mahdis Mousavi; Meyad Hojjar; Navid Qeisari-Nia; Alireza Dehghan; Danial Raeisi
- Edited by: Emad Khodabakhsh
- Music by: Arya Aziminejad
- Running time: 85 minutes
- Country: Iran
- Language: Persian

Bride of the Spring is an Iranian drama film directed and produced by Fereydoun Najafi. The film was produced in 2025–2026. Its story takes place during a drought and focuses on a young woman and a teenager who are searching for a hidden truth.

The film stars Elnaz Shakerdoost, Mohammad Bahrani and Danial Jafari among others.

The film was selected for the 44th Fajr Film Festival, but did not take part in the festival. The festival took place in 2026 amid a number of boycotts by actors and other artists.

== Plot ==
When a spring that provides water for a community dries up, a curious teenager begins searching for the truth. During the search, he meets a young woman. Their encounter reveals a hidden secret and forces them to choose between remaining silent and revealing the truth.
