= Poet of the Wastes =

Iranian film

Poet of the Wastes (Persian: شاعر زباله‌ها, Sha'er-e Zobale-ha) is a 2005 film by the Iranian director Mohammad Ahmadi. Mohsen Makhmalbaf wrote the script of the film, which starred Leila Hatami, Saber Abar, and Mohammad Eskandari. The film was presented at festivals in Chicago, Montreal, and Busan.
