= Alzheimer (film) =

2011 film

- Directed by: Ahmad-Reza Mo'tamedi
- Written by: Ahmad-Reza Mo'tamedi
- Produced by: Saeed Sa'di
- Starring: Faramarz Gharibian
- Cinematography: Ali Loghmani
- Release date: 24 August 2011
- Running time: 103 minutes
- Country: Iran
- Language: Persian

Alzheimer (Persian: آلزایمر) is a 2011 Iranian drama film directed by Ahmad-Reza Mo'tamedi.

== Cast ==
- Faramarz Gharibian as Naeem
- Mehdi Hashemi as Amir Ghasem
- Mahtab Keramati as Assiyeh
- Mehran Ahmadi
- Hamid Ebrahimi as Sarkar
- Hoda Nasseh
- Davood Fathali Baygi as Rohani
- Sufia Dezhakam
