= Sweet Jam (2001 film) =

Sweet Jam (Persian: Morabbaye shirin) is a 2001 film by Iranian director, Marzieh Boroomand. The film was scripted by Farhad Tohidi, based on a novel by Houshang Moradi Kermani. It was lensed by Dariush Ayari. Leila Hatami, Mani Nouri, Ebrahim Abadi and Arzhang Amirfazli starred in the principal roles.
