= Penniless (film) =

- Directed by: Hamid Nematollah
- Written by: Hamid Nematollah; Hadi Moghadamdoost
- Produced by: Mostafa Shayesteh
- Starring: Bahram Radan; Leila Hatami; Reza Rashidpour; Amir Jafari; Afshin Sangchap; Siamak Ansari; Babak Hamidian; Nader Fallah; Tony Zarrindast; Zoherh Safavi
- Cinematography: Alireza Zarrindast
- Edited by: Hassan Hassandoost
- Release date: 10 September 2009

Penniless (Persian: Bi pooli) is a 2009 film by the Iranian director Hamid Nematollah. The script was written by Nematollah and Hadi Moghadamdoost, and the film was lensed by Alireza Zarrindast. Leila Hatami, Bahram Radan and Nader Fallah starred in the principal roles.
