= Kamalolmolk (film) =

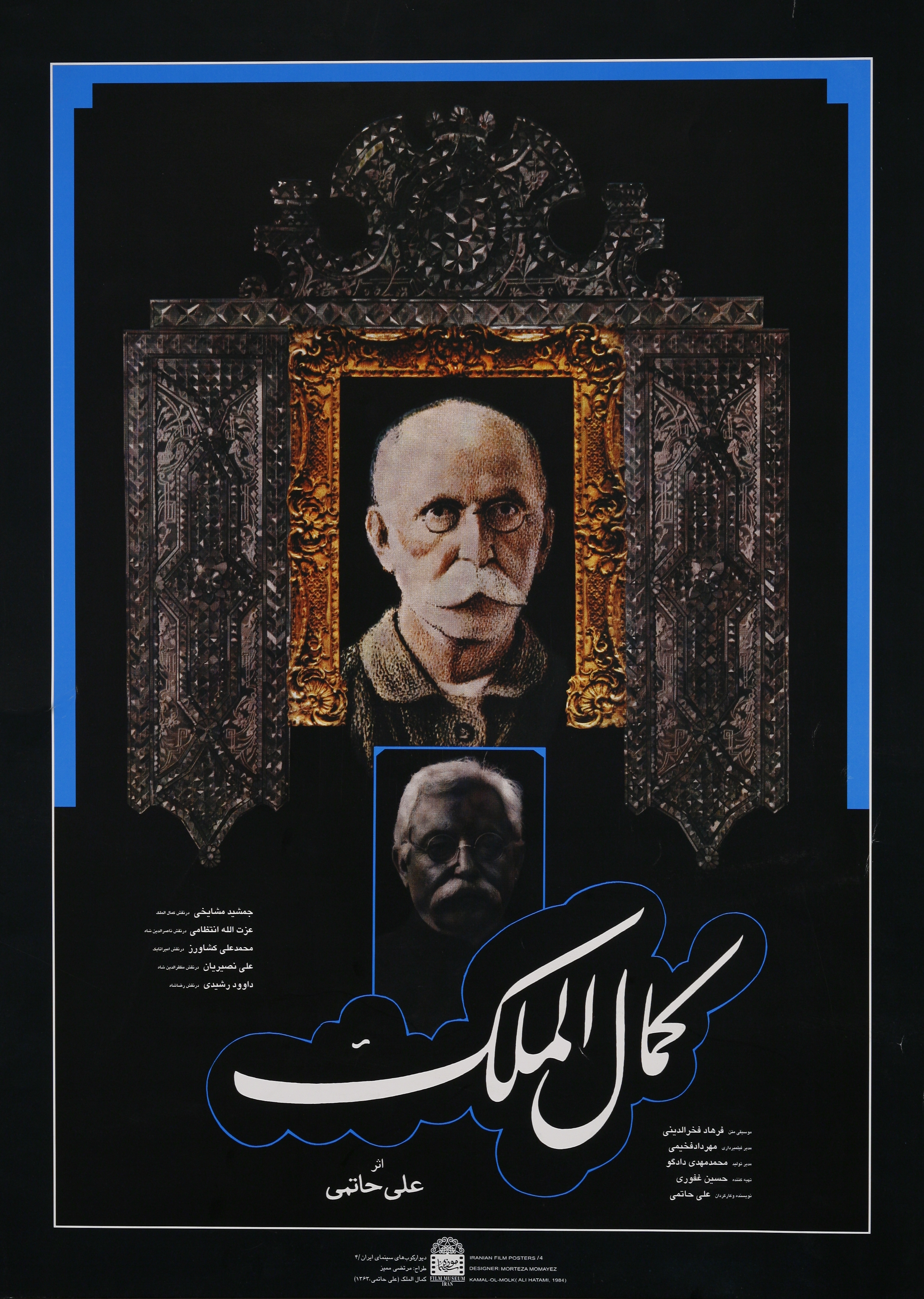
- Film poster
- Directed by: Ali Hatami
- Written by: Ali Hatami
- Produced by: Hossein Ghafoori
- Starring: Jamshid Mashayekhi: Ezzatolah Entezami; Ali Nassirian
- Cinematography: Mehrdad Fakhimi
- Edited by: Rouhollah Emami; Musa Afshar
- Music by: Farhad Fakhredini
- Release date: 9 November 1984 (Iran)
- Country: Iran
- Language: Persian

Kamalolmolk (Persian: کمال‌الملک) is a 1984 Iranian film written and directed by Ali Hatami about the life and work of famous Iranian painter Mohammad Ghaffari, better known as Kamal-ol-molk. The movie focuses greatly on the painter's relationship with the various monarchs of Iran. The cast includes some of the most famous Iranian actors including Jamshid Mashayekhi as the painter himself, and Ezzatollah Entezami as Nasser al-Din Shah. This was also the film debut of the actress Leila Hatami.

== Cast ==
- Jamshid Mashayekhi
- Ezzatolah Entezami
- Ali Nassirian
- Davoud Rashidi
- Mohammad-Ali Keshavarz
- Parviz Poorhosseini
- Leila Hatami
- Manouchehr Hamedi
- Jahangir Forouhar
- Siroos Ebrahimzadeh
