= Every Night, Loneliness =

Film

Movie Poster Every Night Loneliness

Every Night, Loneliness (Persian: Har shab, tanhayi) is a 2009 film by the Iranian director Rasoul Sadremali. The script was written by Sadremali and Kambozia Partovi, and the film was lensed by Faraj Heidari. Leila Hatami, Hamed Behdad, Mohsen Karimi and Marjan Ghare Jah.

== Plot ==
Giving couples relationship advice on her radio show has become Attiyeh's line of work. She responds to inquiries every day about maintaining marriages and family dynamics. Behind the scenes, she and her husband struggle with a dilemma that seems essentially intractable. She has always been the one to offer advice, but as she struggles to accept a pricey and risky medical operation, she realizes that she is now the one who sorely needs it.

== Review ==
According to the Cinema Analytical site about this movie: :'What does not get out of our memory every night goes beyond the direction of Sadr al -Ama'il and the skilled sound of the film and the different play of Hamed Behdad, the astonishing presence of Leila Hatami ... Leila Hatami is one of the best. The role of women in the history of Iranian cinema in this film. 'In silence or when it comes to dialogue, Leila Hatami creates a kind of acting that exceeds the ceiling and capacity of Iranian cinema.'

== Reception ==
Sadr Ameli, the film's director, says about this work, "I have been looking for a screenplay for years to examine the concept of 'pilgrims' in its general sense, and it was very difficult to get closer to it, because it could have been difficult to do with Ria (not pure). I was accused or misunderstood, and it made it much more difficult to deal with."
