= Anna Borkowska (actress) =

Polish-Iranian actress (1916–2008)

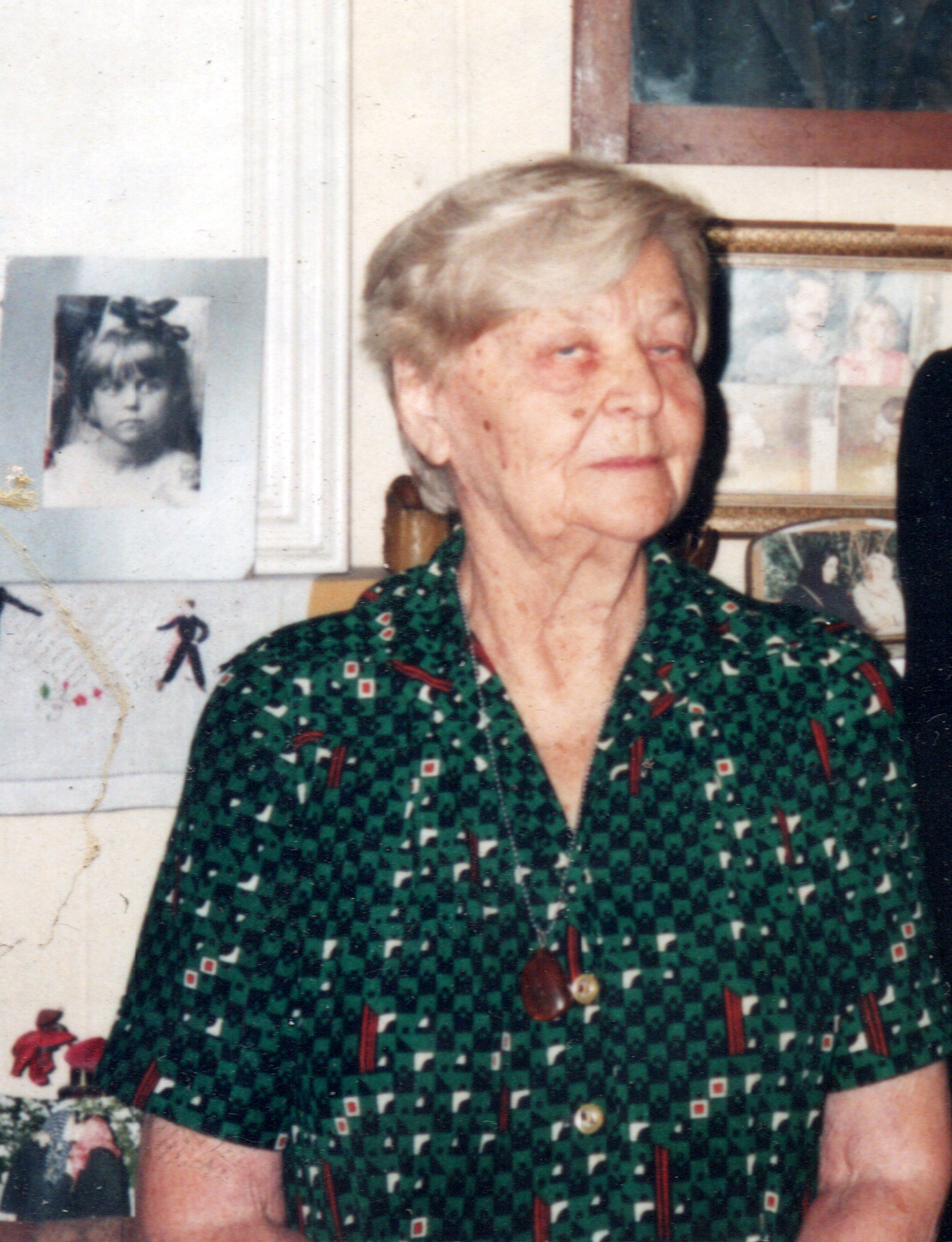
- Anna Borkowska at her home in Tehran in 1999 with a black-and-white picture of herself as a girl behind her, fot. Ivonna Nowicka
- Born: Anna Borkowska; 23 September 1916; Mykolaiv, Russian Empire
- Died: 3 February 2008 (aged 91); Tehran, Iran
- Other names: Anna z Dunin Borkowska-Afkhami Mohajer in Polish sources: Afchami Mohadżer
- Citizenship: Poland; Iran
- Occupation: Actress
- Children: 1

Anna Borkowska (23 September 1916 – 3 February 2008) was a Polish war refugee who settled in Iran. She was an actress and vocal teacher. As a child, after the Soviet invasion of Poland she was forced to leave home with some of her family members and transported to Siberia in the Soviet Union. She was one of the 120,000 Polish refugees who fled the Soviet Union with Anders' Army after the Axis invasion in 1941. She settled in Tehran.

Borkowska is best known to international audiences for her role as the kindly elderly woman who aids a determined little girl in the quest for the perfect goldfish in Jafar Panahi's 1995 film The White Balloon.

Borkowska is also the main character of Khosrow Sinai's The Lost Requiem (original title in Persian: مرثیه گمشده, Marsiye-ye gomshode, released in 1983), which is a documentary about the Poles who found refuge in Iran during World War II, after being forcibly taken to Siberia.

She married an Iranian police officer and assumed the surname Afkhami Mohajer.

Borkowska is buried in the Polish cemetery at Doulab in Tehran.

== Legacy ==
A lecture on Borkowska, on her youth in Poland, the hardships in Soviet slavery, and her life and film career in Iran was delivered by Polish specialist in Iranian studies Ivonna Nowicka in June 2019 in Warsaw. Written and photographic and unique film material from the archives of Nowicka and of researcher Alireza Doulatshahi were used. The lecture is available on Youtube. See also, Ivonna Nowicka, "Anna Borkowska, 'Man artist hastam', czyli 'Jestem artystką'" (Anna Borkowska, "Man artist hastam" or "I am an artist"), In: Perskie losy by Jolanta Sierakowska-Dyndo, Ivonna Nowicka, Stanisław A. Jaśkowski, Warsaw 2023, ISBN 9788382381320, pp. 77-81.
