= Kenan Görgün =

Belgian writer of Turkish origin (born 1977)

Kenan Gorgun
- Born: 18 April 1977; Ghent, Belgium
- Occupations: Screenwriter; novelist; songwriter

Kenan Görgün (born 18 April 1977) is a Belgian writer of Turkish origin, born in Ghent.

He has been studying in a French-speaking school in Brussels.
He studied writing with his professor Gustave Rongy and wrote his first poems and short stories for a magazine called "Marginales".
As a scriptwriter, he has been honored with prizes and is a member of the Association des Scénaristes de l'Audiovisuel.
He wrote songs for the rock band O.I.L.
His latest novel, Patriot Act, features a cop named Elvis Casanova. He has already scheduled 5 more of his adventures...
In 2011, he shot his first feature-length film, called Yadel, produced by Saga Film Belgium.

== Bibliography ==
- 2005: "L'Enfer est à nous", Louvain-la-Neuve, Belgium, Quadrature
- 2006: "Mémoires d'un cendrier sale" – Bookleg N°10, Brussels, Belgium, Maelstrom
- 2006: "L'ogre, c'est mon enfant", Avin, Belgium, Éditions Luce Wilquin
- 2007: "Fosse commune", Paris, France, Fayard
- 2008: "Alcool de larmes" Brussels, Belgium, Éditions Luce Wilquin
- 2009: "Patriot Act", Paris, France, First Editions

== Filmography ==
- 2008: "9mm", a movie by Taylan Barman, scriptwriter
- 2011: "Yadel", scriptwriter and director, produced by Saga Film
