= Mahtab Keramati =

Iranian actress (born 1970)

- مهتاب کرامتی
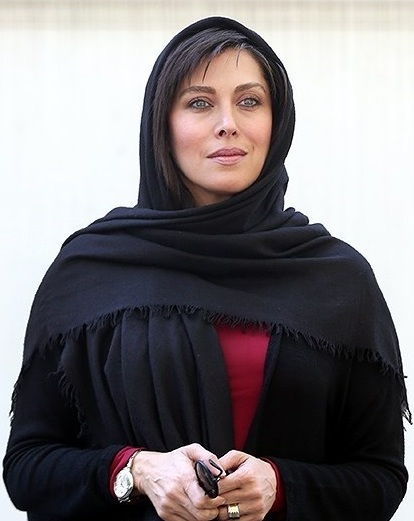
- Born: Mahtab Keramati; 17 October 1970 (age 56); Tehran, Iran
- Education: Bachelor of Microbiology
- Alma mater: Azad University
- Occupations: Actress; Film Producer; UNICEF Goodwill Ambassador
- Years active: 1998–present
- Spouse: Babak Riahipour (m. 1986; div. 2002)

Mahtab Keramati (Persian: مهتاب کرامتی; born 17 October 1970) is an Iranian actress. She has received various accolades, including a Crystal Simorgh, two Hafez Awards. In August 2006, she was appointed as UNICEF Goodwill Ambassador in Iran.

Mahtaab Karami entered the world of acting after marrying Babak Riahipour, with whom she had a daughter. However, this marriage ended in divorce, and she has not remarried since their separation.

== Career ==
Keramati was taking acting courses when she was chosen for the role of Helen in The Men of Angelos, which garnered her national recognition. She later went on to appear in films such as Mummy III and Rain Man for which she was nominated for a Fajr International Film Festival Crystal Simorgh. She then appeared in dramas such as Saint Mary and Crimson Soil and the films Hell, Purgatory, Heaven, There Are Things You Don't Know, Alzheimer and The Private Life of Mr. and Mrs. M.. She won a Crystal Simorgh for Best Actress in a Supporting Role for Twenty. In 2015, she won Best Actor Award Imagineindia Film Festival. She was also featured in Dhaka Film Festival Jury.

== Charity and philanthropic activities ==
After the earthquake of Bam City, which occurred on 26 December 2003, Keramati approached philanthropy and charity work; on 30 December, she was one of the artists partaking in a charity meeting for quake-stricken people of Bam. From 2013, she has been engaged in releasing prisoners-sentenced-to-nemesis. She has put efforts in collecting blood money and getting the next of kin's satisfaction. In this respect, has been one of her companions. Keramati is also a women's rights activist.

== Filmography ==
=== Film ===
- Mardi Az jense Bolour (1999)
- Mumiyayi 3 (2000)
- Mard Barani (2000)
- Behesht az ane To (2000)
- Molaghat ba Tooti (2003)
- Shahe Khamoosh (2003)
- Hashtpa (2005)
- Salvation at 8:20 (2005)
- Hess-e Penhan (2007)
- The Reward of Silence (2007)
- Adam (2007)
- Atash-e Sabz (2008)
- Shirin (2008)
- Tardid (2009)
- Women Are Angels (2009)
- Doozakh Barzakh Behesht (2009)
- Bist (2009)
- Shabane Rooz (2010)
- Adamkosh (2010)
- There Are Things You Don't Know (2010)
- Alzheimer (2011)
- Absolutely Tame Is a Horse (2011)
- The Private Life of Mr. & Mrs. M (2012)
- Azar (2012)
- The Fourth Child (2013)
- Inadvertent (2014)
- Hussein Who Said No
- Ghosts (2014)
- Arghavan (2014)
- Jameh Daran (2015)
- Ice Age (2015)
- BIAFF Film Festival Promo Video 2017 (2017)
- Mazar-i-Sharif
- Majan (2015)
- mordad (2015)
- Boht (2016)
- Shayad Eshgh Nabod (2016)
- old Road (2016)
- orca (2019)
- Sahneh Zani (2020)

=== Television series ===
- The Men of Angelos (1998)
- Saint Mary (2002)
- Khake Sorkh (2002)

== Producer ==
- Orca (2019)
- Platform (2017)
- Take Off (2017)
