= Ministry of Interior Hall =

Concert hall In Tehran, Iran

Ministry of Interior Hall / Tālār e Vezarat e Keshvar
- تالار وزارت کشور; Tālār e Vezarat e Keshvar
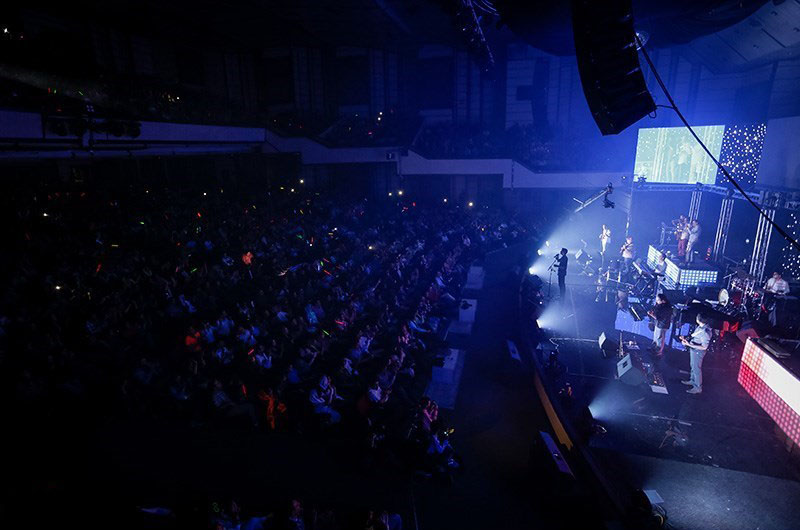
- Interactive map of the Ministry of Interior Hall / Tālār e Vezarat e Keshvar area

General information
- Type: Concert hall
- Location: Shahid Gomnam Street, Tehran, Iran
- Completed: 1979

Other information
- Seating capacity: 3000

Ministry of Interior Hall (Persian: تالار وزارت کشور – Tālār e Vezarat e Keshvar), is a concert hall in Tehran.

== Gallery ==
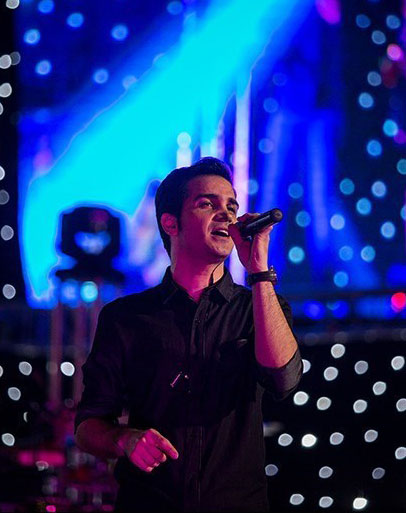
Mohsen Yeganeh performing a concert at Ministry of Interior Hall.

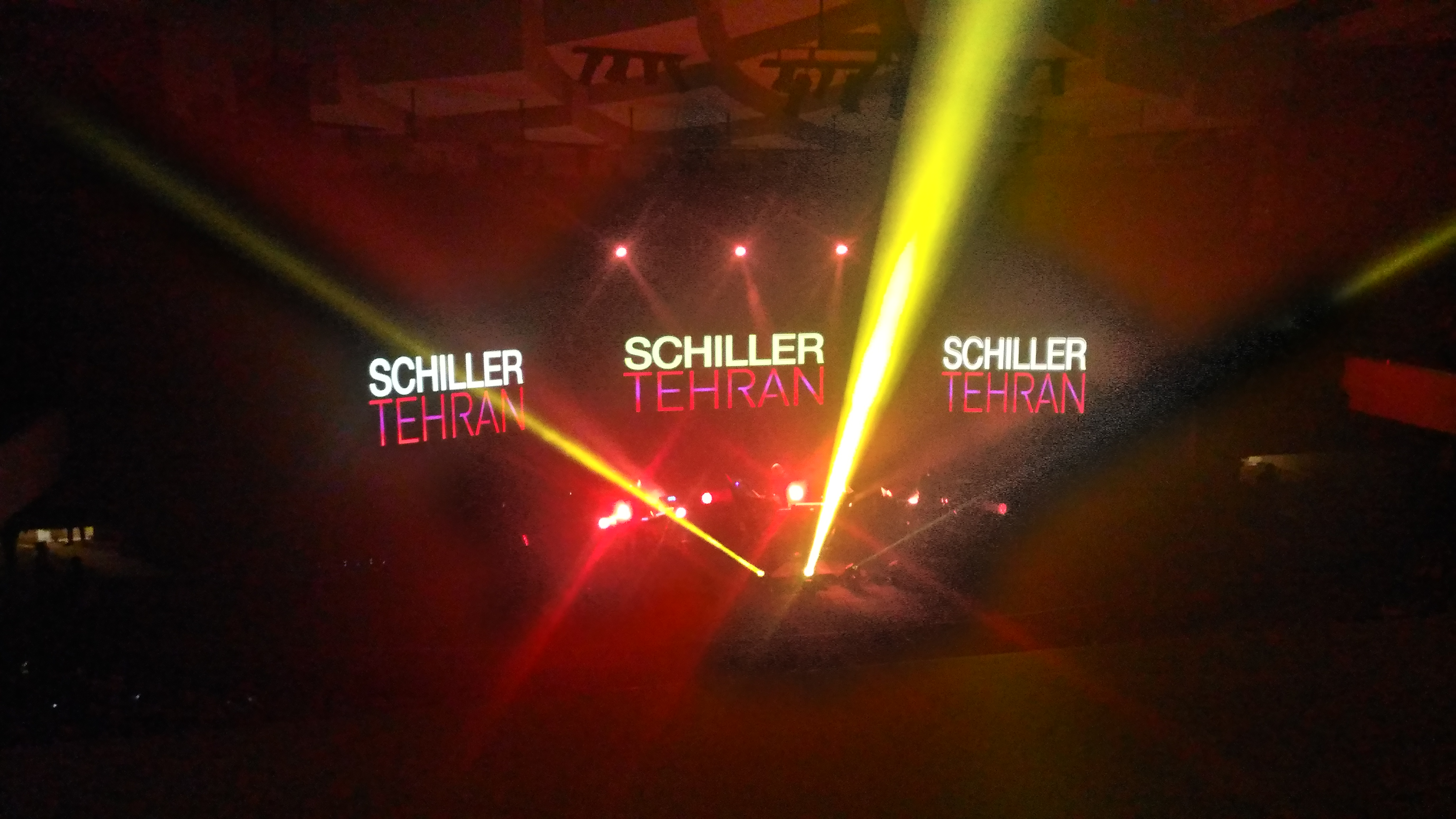
Schiller live in Tehran 2017

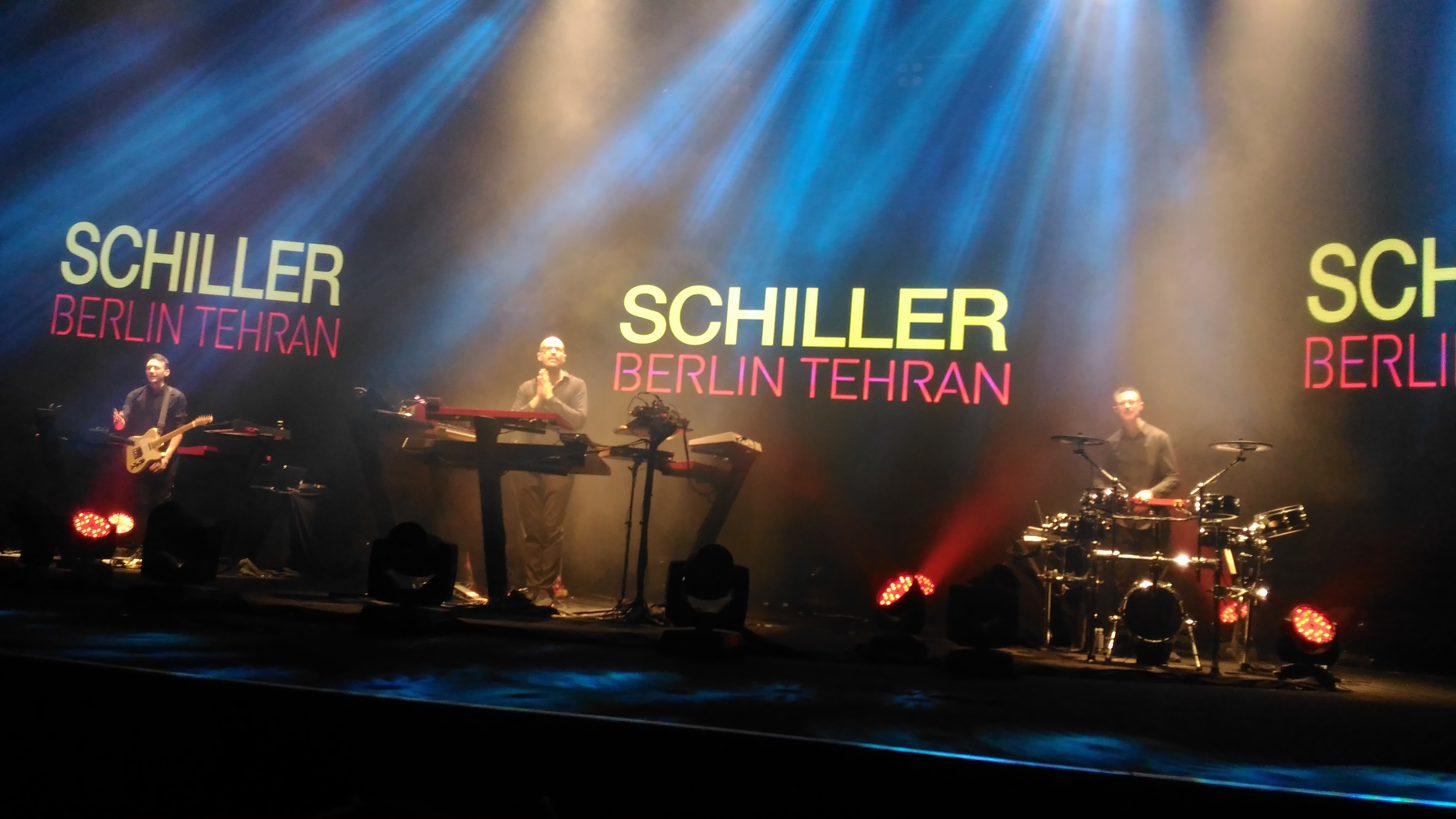
Schiller live in Tehran 2018
