= Varuzh Karim-Masihi =

Iranian film director and editor

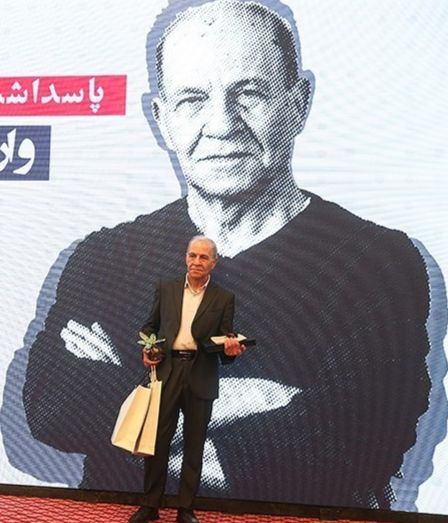
- Varuzh Karim-Masihi
- Born: March 24, 1952 (age 74); Arak, Iran
- Occupations: film director, editor, screenplay writer

Varuzh Karim-Masihi (Armenian: Վարուժ Քարիմ Մասիհի; Persian: واروژ کریم‌مسیحی, born 1953 in َArak) is an Iranian-Armenian film director, film editor, and screenplay writer.

== Biography ==
Born in 1952 in Arak, he had his elementary and high school education in his motherland and then moved to Germany to study medicine.

There, in the Munich club of Armenians, he met an Armenian actor and changed the course of his life. He developed an interest in cinema and when he returned to Iran in 1971, he was introduced to Bahram Bayzai and assisted him in making The Downpour. He assisted on all of his films up to the Islamic Revolution, as well as other directors like Kamran Shirdel, Amir Naderi, and Bahman Farmanara.

He was allowed to study at the College of Dramatic Arts, but turned it over to follow his film making career. In 1975 he made his first short film The Cuckoo, and later, turned a script by Bayzai to another short film titled Salandar. He made his debut feature in 1990, which was extraordinary promising and garnered his eight Crystal Symorghs. It was titled The Last Act and now works as editor for other directors.

== Filmography ==
Incomplete

Year	Film	English title	Director	Writer	Editor
	Parde-ye Akhar	The Last Act	Yes	Yes	Yes
	Tardid	Doubt	Yes	Yes	Yes
	Saray				Yes
2011	Without permission				Yes
1979	Tcherike-ye Tara			Yes	
