= Mohammad Ahmadi =

Iranian film director

- محمد احمدی
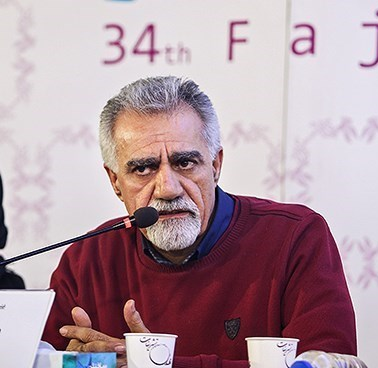

Mohammad Ahmadi (Persian: محمد احمدی) is an Iranian film director, cinematographer and producer.

== Awards ==
- Gold plate and honorary diploma for best dialogue from the fourth Kish Festival, 2002
- Honorary diploma for best dialogue from the ninth Holy defense festival, Mashhad, 2002
- Winner of Best Short Documentary from The 5th Human Rights Documentary Film Festival of Prague, ONE WORLD, Czech Republic 2003
- Best documentary film from Melbourne Film Festival, Australia 2003
- Golden Didor, 2nd Didor International Film Festival 2006
- Ecumenical Prize, Molodost, International Film Festival Kyiv 2006 for the film Poet of the Wastes (Shaer-e Zobale-ha). The ecumenical jury awarded this film because it tells the story of a street sweeper who dreams of becoming a poet. Although he lives in very poor and desperate conditions, he manages to keep his human dignity and love of people and life itself under any circumstances. The difficulties of his everyday life do not influence his inner world and he manages to love people, to enjoy every moment of his life and to keep his dream alive. The Jury found the message of this film very important for people who are trying to survive in the difficult conditions of today's society. The message is that each of us should go through this life keeping their human dignity and dream in their heart, loving people and life.

== Filmography ==
- Captive, Waiting .... (2002 Documentary)
- Poet Of The Wastes (2005)
- Nature's Hymor (2006 Documentary)
- Lost Truth (2007)
