= Christophe Rezai =

French-Iranian composer

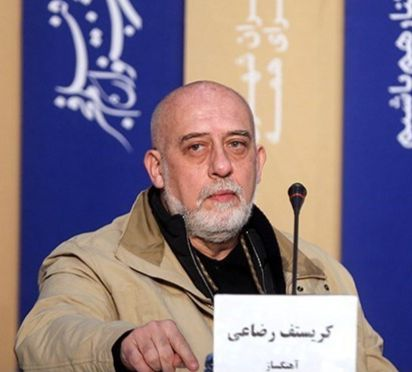
Christophe Rezai, 2020

Christophe Rezai (Persian: کریستف رضاعی; born 1966 in Toulouse) is a French-Iranian composer living in Tehran since 1994.

== Career ==
He was born from an Iranian Father and a French mother in 1966 in the city of Toulouse in France. He has studied music (piano, vocal and theory) along with engineering and marketing. Since 1987 he has recorded around 300 tracks for Iranian television advertisement. He has composed soundtracks for long films, short films as well as documentaries and has worked with directors like Dariush Mehrjui, Mani Haghighi, Shahram Mokri, Safi Yazdanian, Rassoul Sadr Ameli and many others. He initiated a baroque music ensemble (Aria Music) in 1996, giving concerts in Iran & India. He further established the Nour ensemble. In the summer of 2004, Nour appeared in a musical documentary, this time filmed at the Palace of Ardashir in Firouzabad. The arrangements of Journey (2001, Hermes Records) is also among his musical activities. In 2003, Rezai won the first prize of the Avignon Film Festival for the best Film Music and in 2017 he won the Crystal Symorgh from the 35th Fajr Film Festival for the movie "Negar" directed by Rambod Javan. Since then, he has concentrated on writing music for films and on developing the Nour ensemble.

=== Nour ensemble ===
Nour ensemble is an Iranian music ensemble under Rezai's leadership, whose repertoire focuses on medieval, baroque, Kurdish and Persian vocal music. The Noure ensemble has been featured in a documentary produced by the television network Arte in 2002 and has performed in concerts in France, Iran, Belgium, the Netherlands, South Korea and Austria.

The ensemble was founded in 2000 and is composed of nine artists, French, Kurdish and Persian, singers and instrumentalists. The group mission is to combine the Iranian musical tradition and European musical tradition and to reinterpret traditional Persian, Kurdish and European repertoire.

The group's first album, ALBA was recorded in Firouzabad Palace. The group performance in Vahdat Hall (2007) has been considered as one of the best Iranian-Western fusion music works ever.
