= List of Iranian male actors =

The following is a list of Iranian male actors in alphabetical order.

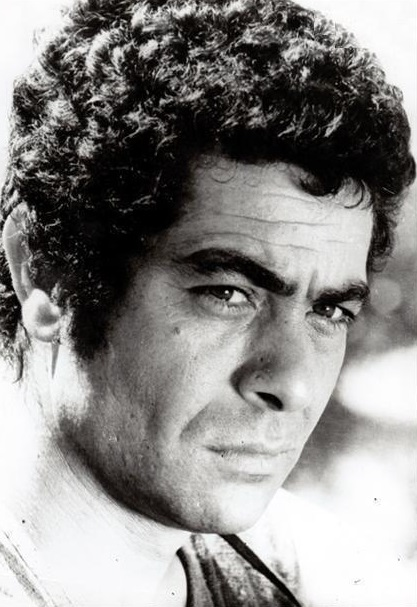
Behrouz Vossoughi

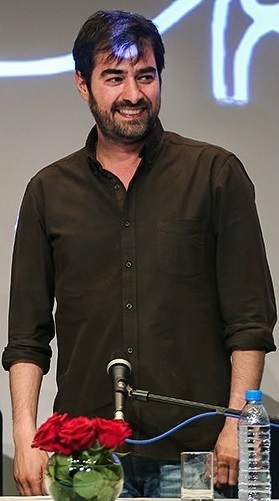
Shahab Hosseini

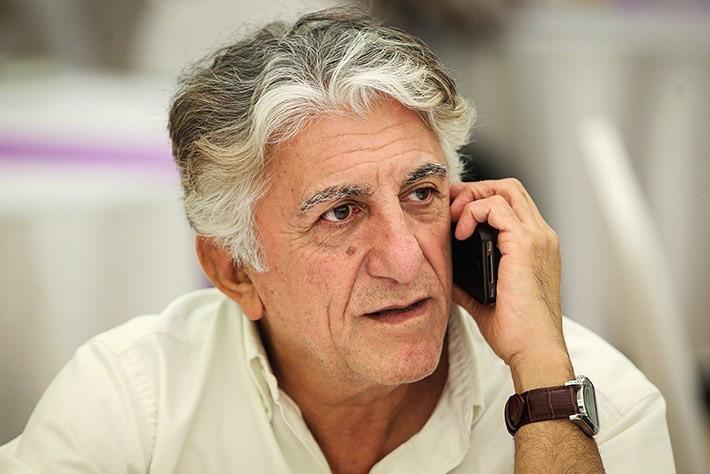
Reza Kianian

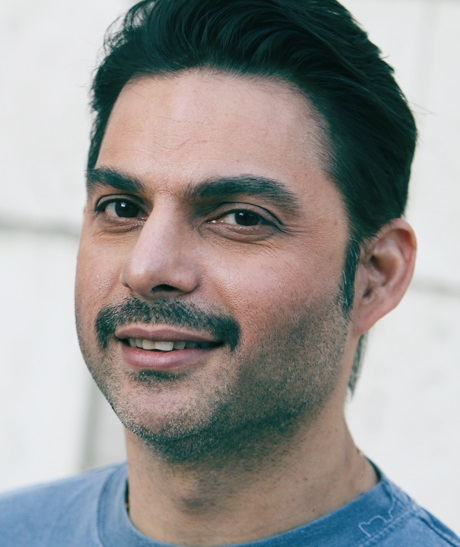
Peyman Moaadi

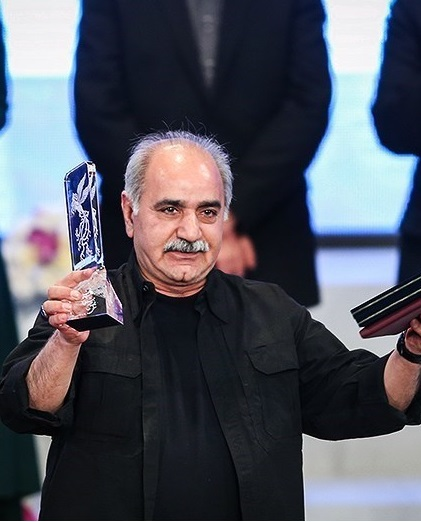
Parviz Parastui

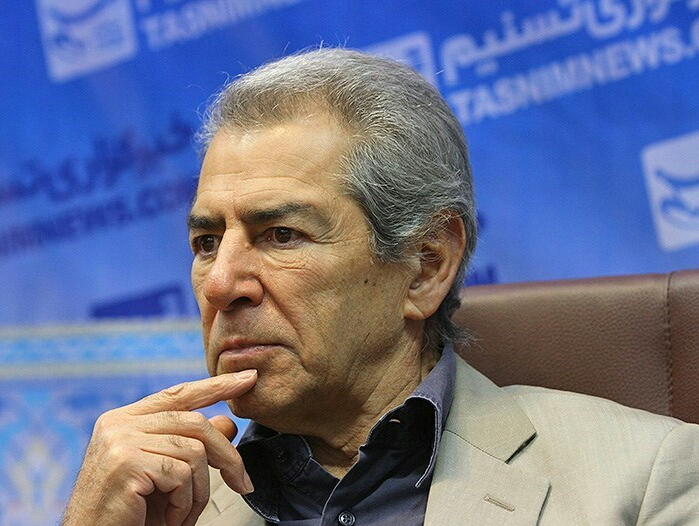
Faramarz Gharibian

== A ==
- Arzhang Amirfazli (1970-)
- Fariborz Arabnia (1963-)
- Hasan Abbasi (1966-)
- Akbar Abdi (1958-)
- Bahram Afshari
- Dan Ahdoot (1978-)
- Jonathan Ahdout (1989-)
- Jahangir Almasi (1955-)
- Siamak Ansari (1968-)
- Amir Hossein Arman (1982-)
- Farhad Aslani (1966-)
- Aziz Asli (1938–2015)
- Reza Attaran (1968-)
- Nozar Azadi (1938–2021)
- Amir Aghai (1975-)
- Morteza Aghili
- Peiman Abadi
- Saber Abar
- Ali Ansarian
- Ahmad Aghaloo

== B ==
- Enayatollah Bakhshi (1945–2026)
- Mehdi Bajestani (1974-)
- Hooman Barghnavard (1969-)
- Pejman Bazeghi (1974-)
- Reza Beyk Imanverdi (1936–2003)
- Mohamad Bahrani

== D ==
- Bijan Daneshmand (1958-)
- Kambiz Dirbaz (1975-)

== E ==
- Bijan Emkanian (1953-)
- Ezzatollah Entezami (1924–2018)
- Homayoun Ershadi (1947–2025)
- Javad Ezzati

== F ==
- Parviz Fannizadeh (1937–1979)
- Behzad Farahani (1945-)
- Hamid Farrokhnezhad (1969-)
- Mohammad Ali Fardin (1930–2000)
- Mehdi Fat'hi (1939–2004)
- Reza Fazeli (1935–2009)
- Jahangir Forouhar (1916–1997)
- Mohammad Reza Foroutan (1968-)

== G ==
- Ahmad Ghadakchian (1920–2006)
- Iraj Ghaderi (1934–2012)
- Cihangir Ghaffari (1940-)
- Naeim Ghalili (1962-)
- Faramarz Gharibian (1941-)
- Mohammad Reza Golzar (1977-)
- Nematollah Gorji (1926–2000)
- Shapur Gharib

== H ==
- Amin Hayai
- Babak Hamidian
- Mani Haghighi
- Kazem HajirAzad
- Mehdi Hashemi
- Mohamadreza Hedayati
- Hadi Hejazifar
- Shahab Hosseini
- Jamshid Hashempour
- Javad Hashemi
- Farzad Hasani

== I ==
- Hasan Joharchi

== J ==
- Mohammad Reza Jozi
- Amir Mahdi Jule
- Abbas Jamshidifar
- Pejman Jamshidi
- Amir Jadidi
- Amir Jafari

== K ==
- Ramin Karimloo
- Alireza Kamali
- Mohamad Kasebi
- Amirhossein Kermanshahi
- Mohammad Ali Keshavarz
- Reza Kianian
- Hamed Komeili
- Behzad Khalaj
- Alireza Khamse
- Ashkan Khatibi
- Ardeshir Kazemi
- Babak Karimi
- Poulad kimiayi

== L ==
- Hamid Lolayi
- Aref Lorestani

== M ==
- Majid Majidi
- Jamshid Mashayekhi
- Peyman Moaadi
- Arian Moayed
- Mehran Modiri
- Navid Mohamadzadeh
- Mirsaeed Molavian
- Esmail Mehrabi
- Ahmad Mehranfar
- Ali Mosafa

== N ==
- Arsi Nami
- Amir Norouzi

== P ==
- Hosein Panahi
- Parviz Parastui
- Atila Pesyani
- Parsa Pirouzfar
- Mojtaba Pirzadeh
- Jalal Pishvaian
- Pouria Poursorkh
- Hasan Pourshirazi

== R ==
- Iraj Rad
- Saeed Rad
- Bahram Radan
- Vahid Rahbani
- Javad Razavian
- Hossein Rajabian
- Davoud Rashidi

== S ==
- Majid Salehi
- Kazem Sayahi
- Parviz Sayyad
- Houman Seyyedi
- Mohamad Ali Sepanlou
- Reza Shafiei Jam
- Khosrow Shakibaee
- Martin Shamoonpour
- Mohammad Reza Sharifinia
- Hootan Shakiba
- Sorush Sehat
- Mohamadreza Solati
- Ali Sadeghi

== T ==
- Amin Tarokh
- Hamid Tamjidi
- Mohsen Tanabande (1975-)
- Shaun Toub (1963-)
- Iraj Tahmaseb

== V ==
- Behrooz Vosoughi (1937-)

== Y ==
- Hossein Yari (1967-)

== Z ==
- Mostafa Zamani (1982-)
- Amin Zendegani (1972-)
