= The Green Journey =

- Genre: Drama; Family
- Written by: Hossein Pakdel
- Directed by: Mohammad Hossein Latifi
- Starring: Parsa Pirouzfar; Mohammad Reza Sharifinia; Amin Tarokh; Sara Khoeniha; Hasan Pourshirazi; Gohar Kheirandish
- Theme music composer: Karen Homayunfar
- Country of origin: Iran
- Original language: Persian
- No. of episodes: 15

Production
- Producer: Majid Ouji
- Running time: 675 minutes

Original release
- Network: IRIB TV3
- Release: 2001 – 2016

The Green Journey (Persian :سفر سبز Safar-e Sabz) is a 2001 Iranian drama TV series directed by Mohammad Hossein Latifi. The cast includes Parsa Pirouzfar, Mohammad Reza Sharifinia, Amin Tarokh, Sara Khoeniha and Gohar Kheirandish.

The Green Journey was aired in 15 episodes in 2001.

IRIB's Channel 3 broadcast the TV series in 2001, 2012 and 2016. It was also broadcast by the Iranian entertainment network iFilm in 2012.

== Synopsis ==
The story is about an Iranian born young man, who was adopted as an infant by a German couple and returns to Iran in order to find his birth mother. The narrative was partly inspired by the real life background of the Swedish Iranian Ashk Dahlén.

== Reception ==
The Green Journey is one of the most popular television series that has been produced in Iran. According to statistics from IRIB, The Green Journey was well received by the viewers of whom the majority were women (67%) or youths (88%).

The series has been praised by critics for its realistic way of portraying sensitive social issues and for its positive portrayal of Iranian adherents to Christianity. This aspect was also the subject of severe criticism from some critics who complained that Muslims and the mosque were portrayed in a negative manner in contrast to Armenians who were portrayed as truthful and devotional and churches that were represented as pure and holy places of worship.
