= Afsaneh Naseri =

Iranian actress (born 1960)

- افسانه ناصری
- Born: 1 January 1960 (age 66); Tehran, Iran
- Occupation: Actress
- Years active: 1995–present
- Notable work: Saint Mary; The Accomplice

Afsaneh Naseri (Persian: افسانه ناصری; born 1 January 1960) is an Iranian actress and radio narrator.

== Early life ==
Afsaneh Naseri was born in 1960 in Tehran, Pahlavi Iran.

== Career ==
In 1995, she took her son Siavash, who was 9 years old at the time, to sign an acting contract in a television series. It was suggested by one of the actors for her to play the role of mother.

== Filmography excerpt ==
- Lovers (TV series) directed by Manouchehr Hadi
- The Morning of the Last Day (TV series) directed by Hossein Tabrizi
- The Accomplice (TV series) directed by Mohsen kiaei
- Left Handed directed by Arash Moayerian
- Standardized Patient directed by Saeed Aghakhani
- The Enigma of the Shah (TV series) directed by Mohammad Reza Varzi
- In Search of Peace (TV series) directed by Saeed Soltani
- Hasht Behesht (TV series) directed by Saeed Alemzadeh
- Thousands of eyes (TV series) directed by Kianoush Ayari
- Dreams land (TV series) directed by Masoud Abparvar
- Saint Mary directed by Shahriar Bahrani
- Tootia directed by Iraj Ghaderi
- Youthful days (TV series) directed by Shapoor Gharib
