= The Enigma of the Shah =

Iranian historical drama film

- معمای شاه
- Genre: Drama; History; Action; Mystery
- Written by: Mohammad Reza Varzi
- Directed by: Mohammad Reza Varzi
- Starring: Hossein Nour Ali; Amiril Arjomand; Mohammad-Reza Sharifinia; Dariush Kardan; Abdoreza Akbari; Hadis Fooladvand; Nader Soleimani; Jamshid Mashayekhi; Mehraveh Sharifinia; Reza Fayazi; Siamak Atlasi; Saeed Amirsoleimani; Shokrekhoda Goudarzi; Jafar Dehghan; Kamand Amirsoleimani; Sepand Amirsoleimani; Shahram Abdoli; Changiz Vosoughi; Nazanin Farahani
- Ending theme: "Silk and Iron" by Salar Aghili
- Country of origin: Iran
- Original language: Persian
- No. of episodes: 95

Production
- Producer: Ali Ladoni
- Running time: 50 Minutes cost =15milion $

Original release
- Network: IRIB TV1; IRIB Tamasha
- Release: October 15, 2016 – 2017

The Enigma of the Shah (Persian: معمای شاه, romanized: Mo'ammāye Shāh) is an Iranian historical drama television series, directed by Mohammad Reza Varzi. The story focuses on Mohammad Reza Pahlavi, the last Shah of Iran, and the events leading up to the Iranian Revolution which led to the abolition of the monarchy.

It aired on cable network IRIB TV1 from 12 January 2014 until October 2016, with over 41 episodes.

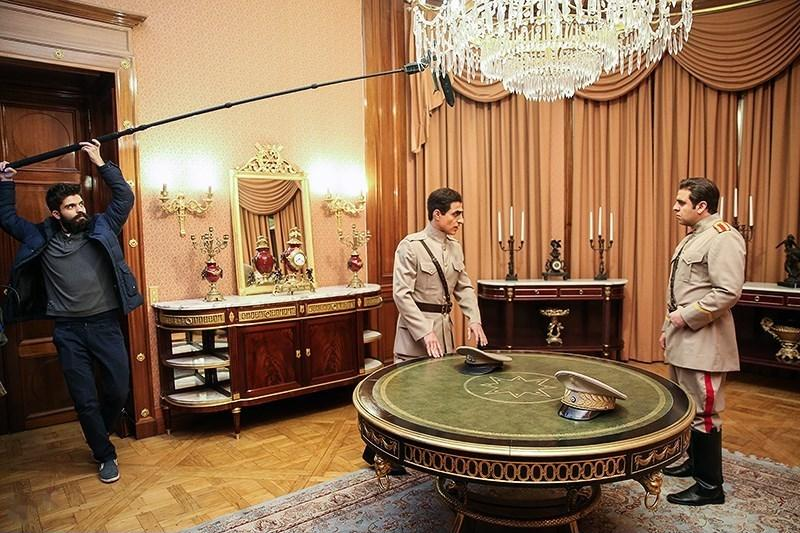

== Cinematographers ==
Cinematography was conducted by Mansour Zohuri, Seyed Meysam Hosseini director, Mehdi Rasouli, and Mehdi Shirdel.

== Synopsis ==
When Reza Shah abdicates, who will become the next Shah? Who has the power to maintain Iran's sovereignty and independence?

== Cast ==
=== Main cast ===
- Hossein Nour Ali as Mohammad Reza Pahlavi
- Amiril Arjomand as Mahmoud Vaziri

=== People around Pahlavi ===
- Jafar Dehghan as Reza Shah
- Hadis Fooladvand as Fawzia Fuad of Egypt
- Mehraveh Sharifinia as Soraya Esfandiary-Bakhtiari
- Saghar Azizi as Farah Diba
- Mojgan Rabbani as Ashraf Pahlavi
- Mohammad-Ali Najafi as Ahmad Qavam
- Nader Soleimani as Shaban Jafari
- Farzaneh Nashatkhah as Queen Nazli of Egypt
- Kazem Afrandnia as Hassan Toufanian

=== People around Vaziri ===
- Saeed NikPour as Ahmad Vaziri
- Gohar Kheirandish as Tooba
- Narges Mohamad as Golnar
- Azadeh EsmaeelKhani as NoorAfagh
- Yousof Teymoori as Amir Masoud
- Roz Razavi as Azar Etemadi
- Mohammad-Reza Sharifinia as Jafar Mehrdad
- Shokrekhoda Goudarzi as Ruhollah Khomeini
- Reza Fayazi as Churchill
- Afsaneh Naseri as Farideh Diba

== Original soundtrack ==
No.	Title	Artists	Length
1.	"My life is for Iran"	Salar Aghili	4:27
2.	"Silk and Iron"	Salar Aghili	4:45
3.	"Blood Lyrics"	Salar Aghili	4:12
4.	"Freezing date"	Bahram Paeez	4:00
Total length:			17:24

== Recognition ==
Year	Award	Category	Recipient	Result
2016	16th Hafez Awards	Best OST Song	Salar Aghili	Won
2017	17th Hafez Awards	Best OST Song	Salar Aghili	Won

== Sources ==
- Main Page moamaeshah.ir - 8 November 2015
