= Sharifinia =

Sharifinia is a surname. Notable people with the surname include:

- Mehraveh Sharifinia (born 1981), Iranian actress
- Mohammad-Reza Sharifinia (born 1955), Iranian actor and film producer
