= Michael Shahrestani =

Iranian actor, playwright, theatre director (born 1963)

میکائیل شهرستانی Mikaeil Shahrestani
- Born: 19 April 1963 (age 63); Tehran, Iran
- Other name: Michaeil
- Education: Great Art Faculty of National Media Corporation
- Occupations: Actor, director, playwright
- Years active: 1982 – present

Michael Shahrestani (Persian: میکائیل شهرستانی; born 19 April 1963) is an Iranian theatre director, playwright, stage and film actor, and arts instructor.

== Education ==
He graduated from the Great Art Faculty of National Media Corporation.

== Career ==
=== Cinema (as an actor) ===
- 1995 – Sayebe Sayeh, directed by Ali Jokan
- 2008 – The Voices, directed by Farzad Motamen

=== Theater (as a director or playwright) ===
- 1987 – Ajax by Sophocles, Tehran: Niavaran Cultural Center – City Theater of Tehran
- 1988 – Médée (Medea) by Jean Anouilh, Tehran: City Theater of Tehran
- 1988 – Arash by Bahram Bayzai, Tehran: Theater Office
- 1990 – See Morgh SiMorgh by Ghotbedin Sadeghi, Tehran: City Theater of Tehran
- 1991 – Hamlet by William Shakespeare, Tehran: City Theater of Tehran
- 1992 – Les Fourberies de Scapin by Molière, Tehran
- 1993 – The Wise Man and the Crazy Tiger by Ghotbedin Sadeghi, Tehran: Cultural Heritage organization – Avini Hall- France: vile
- 1994 – Bahram Choobineh by Siamack TaghiPoor, Tehran: City Theater of Tehran
- 1995 – Rostam’s Seven Labours by Ghotbedin Sadeghi, Tehran: Sadabad Palace
- 1995 – Jam's Weeping by Ghotbedin Sadeghi, Tehran: City Theater of Tehran
- 1996 – Mobarak, the Little Watch by Ghotbedin Sadeghi, Tehran: Niavaran Palace
- 1996 – Times of Innocence by Ghotbedin Sadeghi, Tehran: City Theater of Tehran
- 1997 – Women of Sabra, Men of Shatila by Ghotbedin Sadeghi, Tehran: Vahdat Hall- Main Hall of City Theater of Tehran
- 1998 – Arash by Bahram Bayzai, Tehran: City Theater of Tehran
- 1999 – Calligraphy of Love by Ghotbedin Sadeghi, Tehran: City Theater of Tehran
- 2000 – Seven Lost Tribes by Ghotbedin Sadeghi, Tehran: City Theater of Tehran
- 2001 – Sahoori by Ghotbedin Sadeghi, Tehran: City Theater of Tehran
- 2003 – Afshin & Boodalaf Are Both Dead by Ghotbedin Sadeghi, Tehran: City Theater of Tehran
- 2004 – Dakhme Shirin by Ghotbedin Sadeghi, Tehran: City Theater of Tehran
- 2005 – Akse Yadegari by Ghotbedin Sadeghi, Tehran: City Theater of Tehran
- 2005 – The Just Assassins (Les Justes) (Adelha) by Albert Camus, Tehran: City Theater of Tehran
- 2008 – Memorial of Zariran (Yadegare Zariran) by Ghotbeddin Sadeghi, Tehran: City Theater of Tehran
- 2009 – ShekarPareh’s Garden by Ghotbeddin Sadeghi, Tehran: City Theater of Tehran
- 2012 – If You Had Not Gone by Ghotbeddin Sadeghi, Tehran: Cheharsou Hall of City Theater of Tehran
- 2012 – Macbeth by William Shakespeare, Tehran: Iranshahr Theater

== See also ==
- List of Iranian male actors
- List of Iranian writers
- List of playwrights
- List of theatre directors
