= Ferris wheel (TV series) =

- Persian: چرخ و فلک
- Genre: Drama
- Written by: Ali Reza Talebzadeh
- Directed by: Aziz Allah Hamidnejad
- Starring: Behnaz Jafari; Hamid Reza Azarang; Alireza Jafari; Asha Mehrabi; Mehran Ahmadi; Amir Aghaei; Milad KeyMaram; Leila Otadi; Shabnam Moghaddami; Keyhan Maleki; Tarlan Parvaneh; Shamsi Fazlollahi; Setareh Hosseini; Amin Zendegani; Siavash Tahmoures
- Theme music composer: Salar Aghili
- Composers: Sattar Oraki; Peyman Khazani
- Country of origin: Iran
- Original language: Persian
- No. of seasons: 1
- No. of episodes: 28

Production
- Producer: Majid Molaei
- Production location: Tehran
- Cinematography: Ali Reza Ranjbaran
- Editor: Mohammad Hossein Ghazanfari
- Running time: 45 minutes

Original release
- Release: 25 July – 27 August 2016

Ferris wheel (Persian: چرخ و فلک) is an Iranian Drama series. The series is directed by Aziz Allah Hamidnejad.

== Storyline ==
The main theme of the series is a moral concept that is repeated in each of the stories, and most of the actors are supporting characters at the beginning of each story, who become the main actor in the next story.

== Cast ==
- Behnaz Jafari
- Hamid Reza Azarang
- Alireza Jafari
- Asha Mehrabi
- Mehran Ahmadi
- Amir Aghaei
- Milad KeyMaram
- Leila Otadi
- Shabnam Moghaddami
- Keyhan Maleki
- Sheida Khaligh
- Tarlan Parvaneh
- Shamsi Fazlollahi
- Setareh Hosseini
- Amin Zendegani
- Siavash Tahmoures
- Linda Kiani
- Hossein Soleimani
- Mina Jafarzadeh
- Mohammad Kart
- Bahram Ebrahimi
- Farzaneh Neshatkhah
- Ehsan Emami
- Ghasem Zare
- Abbas Ghazali
- Maryam Bobani
- Mehrdad Ziaei
- Laleh Sabouri
- Andisheh Fouladvand
- Fataneh Malek Mohammadi
- Mojtaba Tabatabaei
- Fatemeh Shokri
- Amir Mohammad Zand
- Mehrdad Falahatgard
- Farhad Besharati
- Safa Aghajani
- Mohammad Reza Rahbari
- Fereshteh Sarabandi
