= Oskouei =

Oskouei, Oskouie, or Oskooi may refer to:

- Mahin Oskouei (1931–2006), Iranian theatre director and playwright
- Mehrdad Oskouei (born 1969), Iranian filmmaker
- Saman and Sasan Oskouei (born 1985 and 1991), Iranian artists and activists
- Rabeh Oskouie, Iranian actress
- Shirin Oskooi, American contestant of reality television series Survivor
