= Days of Waiting =

Days of Waiting may refer to:

- Days of Waiting: The Life & Art of Estelle Ishigo, a 1990 film by Steven Okazaki
- Days of Waiting (1987 film), a 1987 film by Asghar Hashemi
