= Left Handed (film) =

- Persian: چپ‌دست
- Directed by: Arash Moayerian
- Written by: Bahman Motamedian
- Produced by: Dariush Babaeian; Manouchehr Zebardast
- Starring: Hamid Goodarzi; Leila Otadi; Behzad Farahani; Rabeh Oskouie; Afsaneh Naseri; Malakeh Ranjbar; Reza Davood Nejad; Mehdi Aminikhah; Asghar Semsarzadeh; Tarlan Parvaneh
- Cinematography: Mojtaba Rahimi
- Edited by: Arash Moayerian
- Music by: Fariborz Lachini
- Production company: Shokufa Film
- Release date: 3 February 2006
- Running time: 94 Min
- Country: Iran
- Language: Persian

Left Handed (Persian: چپ‌دست ; Chap Dast) is a 2006 Iranian comedy and romance film directed by Arash Moayerian. This film is an Iranian remake of 50 First Dates.

== Plot ==
Sara (Leila Otadi) loses her short-term memory due to a serious accident in a car race. She falls into a coma for a year, and after waking up, every day, 21 June, is her father's birthday. Sami (Hamid Goodarzi) likes her, but no matter how hard he tries, the next day Sarah forgets everything and doesn't recognize him. Sami makes a short film for her and tells her everything that happened in the last year, but...

== Cast ==
- Hamid Goodarzi as Sami Rad
- Leila Otadi as Sara Zandi
- Behzad Farahani as Kiumars Zandi (Father of Sara)
- Rabeh Oskouie as Aunt of Sara
- Afsaneh Naseri as Mother of Sara
- Malakeh Ranjbar as Grandmother of Sami
- Reza Davood Nejad as Payam
- Mehdi Aminikhah as Ramin Zandi
- Asghar Semsarzadeh as Mr Asghar
- Tarlan Parvaneh as Daughter of Sara and Sami
- Ali Salehi as Friend of Sami
- Ashkan Eshtiyagh as Friend of Sami
- Fariborz Lachini
- Majid Salehi
- Kazem Afrandnia
- Anooshiravan Naeemi
- Shima Ghafari
