= Youthful Days =

1999–2000 series

- Persian: روزگار جوانی
- Genre: Drama
- Written by: Asghar Farhadi; Fariborz Kamkari; Farhad Naghdali
- Directed by: Shapoor Gharib
- Starring: Keyhan Maleki; Amin Hayai; Nasrollah Radesh; Behzad Khodaveisi; Mehdi Sabaei; Nematollah Gorji; Zohreh Fakour Sabour; Afsaneh Naseri; Hassan Joharchi; Amin Zendegani
- Theme music composer: Mohammad Reza Eivazi
- Composer: Sasan Jamalian
- Country of origin: Iran
- Original language: Persian
- No. of seasons: 3
- No. of episodes: 68

Production
- Producer: Asghar Tavasoli
- Production location: Tehran
- Cinematography: Hushang Banaei
- Editors: Ali Sabkroo; Mohammad Albeigi
- Running time: 45-50 minutes

Original release
- Release: 3 February 1999 – 7 November 2021

Youthful Days (Persian: روزگار جوانی) is an Iranian drama series. The series is directed by Shapoor Gharib.

== Storyline ==
Five young students from other Iranian cities studying in Tehran rent a house and live together. Each of these five people has a different personality and they encounter a new story in each episode. But in the end, they help each other overcome the problems.

== Cast ==
- Keyhan Maleki
- Amin Hayai
- Nasrollah Radesh
- Behzad Khodaveisi
- Mehdi Sabaei
- Nematollah Gorji
- Zohreh Fakour Sabour
- Afsaneh Naseri
- Hassan Joharchi
- Amin Zendegani
- Sahar Sabbagh Seresht
- Biuk Mirzaei
- Siamak Ansari
- Reza Banafshehkhah
- Tooran Ghaderi
- Dariush Asadzadeh
- Homeira Riazi
- Kiumars Malekmotei
- Ramin Parchami
- Mohsen Zaehtab
- Zohreh Safavi
- Hossein Shahab
- Hamid Mehrara
- Hamid Delshakib
- Hassan Mehmani
- Farhad Khanmohammadi
- Hossein Khanibeik
