= Wander About Me =

- پرسه در حوالی من
- Directed by: Ghazaleh Soltani
- Written by: Ghazaleh Soltani
- Produced by: Ghazaleh Soltani
- Starring: Mehraveh Sharifinia; Behnaz Jafari; Nasrin Nakisa; Soosan Maghsoodloo; Mohsen Soleimani; Ali Golzadeh
- Cinematography: Mohammadreza Sokoot
- Edited by: Kaveh Imani
- Music by: Omid Raiesdana
- Release date: 6 June 2017
- Running time: 90 minutes
- Country: Iran
- Language: Persian

Wander About Me (Persian: پرسه در حوالی من) is a 2017 Iranian film directed by Ghazaleh Soltani.

== Plot ==
It is the story of a 30 years old girl Sayeh who in the middle of the big city is pursuing her dreams and ideals. She is a single and independent girl who wants to have a baby but she doesn't want to get married. This film was released in the 35th Fajr Film Festival, Tehran. It has been screened at the 8th edition of the Bridges International Film Festival in Greece. Wander about me has been selected to be screened at Cyprus International Film Festival.

== Cast ==
- Mehraveh Sharifinia as Sayeh
- Behnaz Jafari as Asal (Baby's mother)
- Nasrin Nakisa as Malih Khanom
- Soosan Maghsoodloo as Mrs. Rezvani
- Mohsen Soleimani as Peiman
- Ali Golzadeh as Somayeh
- Atoosa Rasti as Mina
- Bahram Sarvari Nezhad as Mansour
- Maryam Noormohamadi as Maryam

== Award ==
Mehraveh Sharifinia was granted the best actress award at Greece Bridges Peloponnesian International Film Festival for her role in this film. At the ceremony Sharifinia said: "It's my pleasure to be awarded as the best actress for the movie "Wander about me" in Bridges Film Festival. And it's good to have my prize in this women's film festival."
