= Tootia =

- Film poster
- طوطیا
- Directed by: Iraj Ghaderi
- Written by: Alireza Davood Nejad
- Produced by: Morteza Shayseteh
- Starring: Fariborz Arabnia; Shaghayegh Farahani; Afsaneh Bayegan; Behzad Farahani; Afsaneh Naseri; Aida Motallebi
- Cinematography: Asghar Rafieijam
- Edited by: Zhila Ipakchi
- Music by: Fariborz Lachini
- Distributed by: Hedayat Film
- Release date: 20 March 1998
- Running time: 99 minutes
- Country: Iran
- Language: Persian

Tootia (Persian: طوطیا) is a 1998 Iranian drama film written by Alireza Davood Nejad and directed by Iraj Ghaderi.

== Plot ==
Shaghayegh (Shaghayegh Farahani), the CEO of a cooperative, needs more money to build a specialized pediatric medical complex. Shaghayegh's husband, Siavash (Fariborz Arabnia), will have taking a doctoral exam, But Shaghayegh leaves the housework to him. Siavash protests, The dispute escalates and Shaghayegh angrily goes to her father's house. Siavash takes care of Tootia (Aida Motallebi), But one day, Tootia falls from a height for fear of his father and has a disability and ...

== Cast ==
- Fariborz Arabnia
- Shaghayegh Farahani
- Afsaneh Bayegan
- Behzad Farahani
- Afsaneh Naseri
- Aida Motallebi
- Ali Sartipi
- Armin Vareszadeh
- Fatemeh Taheri
- Morteza NikKhah

== Awards and nominations ==
17nd Fajr International Film Festival:

- Nominated: Best Actress in a Supporting Role (Aida Motallebi)
