= Asal Badiee =

Iranian actress (1977–2013)

- عسل بدیعی
- Born: May 9, 1977; Tehran, Iran
- Died: April 1, 2013 (aged 35); Tehran, Iran
- Education: Azad University
- Occupation: Actress
- Years active: 1997–2013
- Spouse: Fariborz Arabnia (m. 2000; div. 2004)
- Children: 1
- Relatives: Reza Davood Nejad (brother-in-law)

Asal Badiee (Persian: عسل بدیعی; May 9, 1977 – April 1, 2013) was an Iranian actress.

She started her cinema career with the film To Be or Not to Be, a product of Kianoosh Ayari. The main subject of the film was organ donation; a task which Badiee performed in her real life.

== Early life ==
Asal Badiee was born in Tehranpars, Tehran. Her father, Shahrokh, was an employee at Tejarat Bank.

== Personal life ==
She married Fariborz Arabnia, an Iranian cinema actor and film director in 2000, but they separated after four years; they had one son Janyar.

== Death ==
She was transferred to Loghman Hospital after a drug overdose on March 31, 2013, and died the next day from cardiac and respiratory problems. Her doctor also announced that she had died after cerebral vessels burst.

Two days after her death, it was announced that her internal organs would be donated, with her family's agreement. Her kidney, liver, heart, and lungs were donated on April 5–6, giving seven people new lives, making her the first Iranian cinema actress to do so.

Her funeral took place on April 7, 2013 at Vahdat Hall, with the participation of a large number of Iranian cinema and television actors and many fans. She was buried in Behesht-e Zahra.

== Filmography ==
=== Film ===
- To Be or Not to Be, Kianoosh Ayari, 1997
- Dirty Hands, Sirus Alvand, 1999
- Haft Pardeh, Farzad Motamen, 2000
- Dearly, Bahram Kazemi, 2000
- Candle in the Wind, Pouran Derakhshandeh, 2003
- Butterfly in May, Mohammad-Javad Kazeh Saz, 2005
- Sarboland, Saeed Tehrani, 2006

=== TV Series ===
- Until Morning (2005–06)
- 8th Day (2009)
- Mankind's land (2009–10)
- The sixth person (2010–11)
- Ghazal (2010)
- My father's house (2012)
- Walk in the Line (2012)
