= Parsa Pirouzfar =

Iranian actor

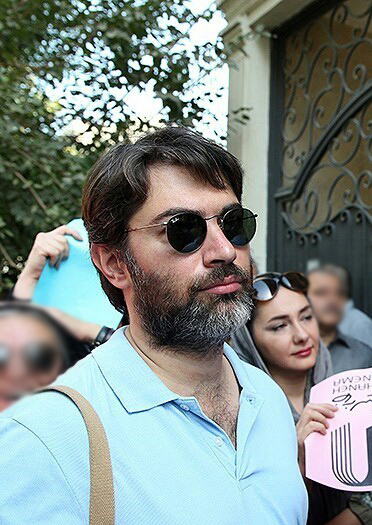
- Pirouzfar in 2013
- Born: Tehran, Iran
- Education: University of Tehran
- Occupations: Actor; playwright; theatre director; painter; translator
- Years active: 1994–present

Parsa Pirouzfar (Persian: پارسا پیروزفر) is an Iranian actor, theatre director, painter, playwright, and translator. He is best known for his role in In the Eyes of the Wind (2009–2010), and Mum's Guest (2004). He has received various accolades, including a Hafez Award and an Iran Cinema Celebration Award, in addition to a nomination for a Crystal Simorgh.

== Early life and education ==
Parsa Pirouzfar was born Tehran, Iran.

From 1984 to 1990, when he was in high school, he created his first comic strips.

Having graduated from high school with maths and physics majors in 1990, he started his academic studies in painting at the Faculty of Fine Arts of the University of Tehran in 1991. In the same year, he also started acting on stage in different university plays.

Pirouzfar also worked as a voice-over actor from 1993 to 1997. His first film role came at the age of 22 in 1994, playing a brief part in Dariush Mehrjui's Pari. In the same year, he studied “Stanislavsky's acting method” under acting instructor Mahin Oskouei, the Iranian theater director and instructor, and Iran's pioneering female theatre arts figure.

In 1995, he continued his studies in acting at Samandarian Institute of Dramatic Arts under renowned Iranian film and theatre director, translator, and acting instructor Hamid Samandarian. His stage debut was in the same year. He performed in Les Misérables directed by Behrouz Gharibpour, Iranian theatre director and pioneer of traditional Persian puppet theatre, and played as Marius Pontmercy.

Having graduated with a bachelor's degree from Tehran University's Faculty of Fine Arts in painting in 1997, he performed in The Lady Aoi by Yukio Mishima, directed by Bahram Beyzaie, playing the role of Hikaru. This was his second official appearance on the stage of the theatre.

== Career ==
Pirouzfar officially started working on his own personal projects for the stage in 2001, and he made his directional debut in theatre with Art, a play by Yasmina Reza.

=== Matryoshka ===
In 2015 Pirouzfar directed the play Matryoshka, a Persian-language satire based on selected short stories of Anton Chekhov, translated, written, and directed by Parsa Pirouzfar. Matryoshka premiered on 13 September 2015 at Theatre West, as a solo performance, in Los Angeles. The play has over 30 characters all performed by Pirouzfar in its theatrical production. Matryoshka subsequently ran for two years in the US cities of Los Angeles, San Diego, and Berkeley as well as Toronto, Vancouver, and Montreal in Canada in 2015 and 2016; and finally, after multiple performances due to its immense popularity, finished its staging in Tehran in 2017.

Matryoshka was particularly important to Pirouzfar's career. His performance, playing over 30 characters of the play all by himself, earned him the Golden Statue Award for Best Actor in the 35th Celebration of the annual Fajr International Theatre Festival in Tehran in 2017.

=== Teaching ===
Pirouzfar gave acting courses as a theatre instructor at Karnameh Institute of Arts and Culture from 2004 to 2005 as well as in extracurricular acting classes at Allameh Tabatabaie University in 2004 and 2005 and at Hilaj Film School in 2007, 2010, and 2011.

Other teaching work includes:

- Freelance Workshops and Acting Classes
- Extracurricular Acting Classes of Allameh Tabatabaie University, 2004–2005
- Karnameh Institute of Arts and Culture, 2004–2005

=== Other work ===
Since graduation from high school, Pirouzfar has also been involved periodically in sculpture, graphic design, and making teasers.

== Other activities and memberships ==
Pirouzfar is a founder member of Iranian Theatre Actors Association, member of Khaneh Cinema (Iranian Alliance of Motion Picture Guilds), member of Iranian Film Actors Association (I.F.A.A.), and The Theatre Forum.

Other memberships include:

- Iranian Theatre Actors Association, founder member
- Khaneh Cinema (The Iranian Alliance of Motion Picture Guilds)
- Iranian Film Actors Association (I.F.A.A.)
- Iranian Theatre Actors Association
- Theatre Forum

Pirouzfar has been a member of the following film festival juries:

- 9th Iranian Film Festival Australia (IFFA), 2020
- 14th Celebration of Khaneh Cinema (Iranian Alliance of Motion Picture Guilds), 2010
- 10th Celebration of Khaneh Cinema (Iranian Alliance of Motion Picture Guilds), 2001
- 9th Celebration of Khaneh Cinema (Iranian Alliance of Motion Picture Guilds), 2000

== Filmography ==
=== Film ===
Year	Title	Role	Director	Notes	Ref(s)
1992	The Status	College Student	Ebrahim Vahidzadeh		
1995	Pari	Eremitic Man	Dariush Mehrjui		
1996	The Feast	Abed	Masoud Kimiai		
1998	Mercedes	Yahya	Masoud Kimiai		
1999	Girls in Expectancy	Saeed Masrour	Rahman Rezaei		
1999	Sheida	Farhad Harandi	Kamal Tabrizi		
2000	Protest	Ghasem	Masoud Kimiai		
2000	A Girl Named Tondar	Ra'ad	Hamid Reza Ashtianipour		
2002	The Lucky Bride	Injaneb	Kazem Rastgoftar		
2003	The Time of Harvesting the Walnuts	Latif Kashani	Iraj Emami		
2004	Mum's Guest	Yousef	Dariush Mehrjui		
2004	The Tear of the Cold	Kaveh Kiani	Azizollah Hamidnezhad		
2004	Late at Night		Asghar Naimi	Short film, unreleased	
2005	Mask	Nima	Kazem Rastgoftar		
2005	The Unwanted Woman	Rahim	Tahmineh Milani		
2009	The Day Goes and the Night Comes	Farrokh	Omid Bonakdar, Keyvan Alimohammadi		
2011	Here Without Me	Reza	Bahram Tavakoli		
2011	Absolutely Tame Is a Horse	Borzou	Abdolreza Kahani		
2014	Life Is Elsewhere	Ali	Manouchehr Hadi		
2015	Gap	Farhad	Kiarash Asadizadeh		
2015	Closer	Ehsan	Mostafa Ahmadi		
2019	Numbness	Shahrokh	Hossein Mahkam		
2020	Titi	Ebrahim	Ida Panahandeh		
2020	No Choice	Dr. Sa'adat	Reza Dormishian		
2024	Intoxicated by Love	Rumi	Hassan Fathi		

=== Web ===
Year	Title	Role	Director	Platform	Notes	Ref(s)
2022	Rebel	Bahman Kazemi	Mohammad Kart	Filimo	Main role	
2024	At the End of the Night	Behnam Afshar	Ida Panahandeh	Filmnet	Main role	
2026	The Red and the Black		Ida Panahandeh	Filimo	Main role	
TBA	Leily and Majnun		Hamid Reza Ghorbani		Main role	

=== Television ===
Year	Title	Role	Director	Notes	Network	Ref(s)
1995	Under Your Protection	Parsa Farzinpour	Hamid Labkhandeh	TV series	IRIB TV2	
1998	In My Heart	Reza Toloui	Hamid Labkhandeh	TV series	IRIB TV3	
2002	The Green Journey	Daniel Wessberg	Mohammad Hossein Latifi	TV series	IRIB TV3	
2009–2010	In the Eye of the Wind	Bijan Irani	Masoud Jafari Jozani	TV series	IRIB TV1	

== Theatre ==
Year	Title	Role	Director	Playwright	Translator	Notes
2019	The Visit	Schoolmaster	Parsa Pirouzfar	Friedrich Dürrenmatt	Parsa Pirouzfar	
2018	Les Misérables	Jean Valjean	Hossein Parsaei	Victor Hugo		(Musical)
2018	A Summer's Day	Mof	Parsa Pirouzfar	Slawomir Mrozek	Parsa Pirouzfar Sepideh Khosrowjah	
2015-2017	Matryoshka	All of the Characters	Parsa Pirouzfar	Parsa Pirouzfar (based on selected short stories of Anton Chekhov)	Parsa Pirouzfar	Golden Statue Award for Best Actor in the 35th Celebration of annual Fajr International Theatre Festival (2017); The play has over 30 characters performed by the playwright and theatre director Parsa Pirouzfar in its theatrical production.
2014	Out at Sea	Fat Castaway	Parsa Pirouzfar	Slawomir Mrozek	Parsa Pirouzfar	
2013	Stones In His Pockets	In 10 role: Charlie Conlon, Jake Quinn, Aisling, third A.D., Mickey, Caroline Giovanni (American star), John (accent coach), Sean Harkin, Dave (a crew member), Sean Harkin (twelve years), Sean Harkin (eight years), Sean's cousin, Kevin Doherty (Interviewer).	Parsa Pirouzfar	Marie Jones	Parsa Pirouzfar	
2012	God of Carnage	Alan Raleigh	Parsa Pirouzfar	Yasmina Reza		Stage reading
2011	Glengarry Glen Ross	Richard Roma	Parsa Pirouzfar	David Mamet	Parsa Pirouzfar	
2001	'Art'	Marc	Parsa Pirouzfar	Yasmina Reza	‌Bahman Kijarostami	
1998	The Lady Aoi	Hikaru	Bahram Beyzaie	Yukio Mishima	Bahram Beyzaie	By Bahram Beyzai production
1995-1997	Les Misérables	Marius Pontmercy	Behrouz Gharibpour	Victor Hugo	Behrouz Gharibpour	

== Awards and nominations ==
Award	Year	Category	Nominated Work	Result	Ref.
China Golden Rooster and Hundred Flowers Film Festival	2006	Best Actor in a Foreign Film	The Tear of the Cold	Won	
Fajr Film Festival	2004	Best Actor in a Supporting Role	Mum's Guest	Nominated	
Fajr International Theater Festival	2017	Best Actor	Matryoshka	Won	
Hafez Awards	2005	Best Actor – Motion Picture	Mum's Guest	Nominated	
Hafez Awards	2011	Best Actor – Television Series Drama	In the Eyes of the Wind	Nominated	
Hafez Awards	2023	Best Actor – Motion Picture	Titi	Nominated	
Hafez Awards	2024	Best Actor – Television Series Drama	At the End of the Night	Won	
Iran Cinema Celebration	1999	Best Actor in a Leading Role	Sheida	Nominated	
Iran Cinema Celebration	2000	Best Actor in a Supporting Role	Protest	Nominated	
Iran Cinema Celebration	2004	Best Actor in a Leading Role	The Tear of the Cold	Nominated	
Iran Cinema Celebration	2004	Best Actor in a Supporting Role	Mum's Guest	Won	
Jam-e-Jam Television Festival	2010	Favorite Actor in a Television Series	In the Eyes of the Wind	Won	
Osian's Cinefan Festival of Asian and Arab Cinema	2005	Best Actor – Asian and Arab Competition	The Tear of the Cold	Won	
