= Kamand Amirsoleimani =

Iranian actress

- كمند امیرسلیمانی
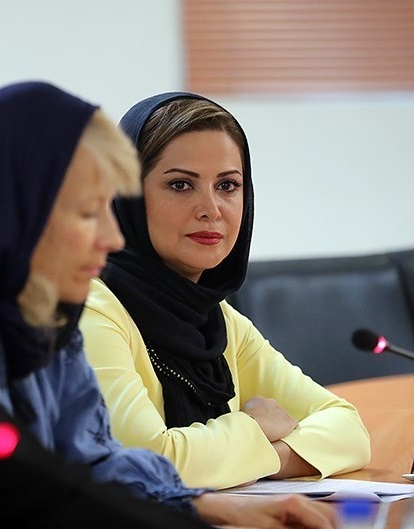
- Amirsoleimani (right) in 2016
- Born: 6 June 1973 (age 53); Tehran, Imperial State of Iran
- Occupation: Actress
- Years active: 1981–present
- Spouse: Vargha Ameri (div.)
- Children: 1
- Relatives: Sepand Amirsoleimani (brother)

Kamand Amirsoleimani (Persian: كمند امیرسلیمانی, born 6 June 1973) is an Iranian actress from Tehran.

== Biography ==
She graduated from the Islamic Azad University in 1997 with a degree in acting and theater directing. She came to television in 1981 and in 1986 she acted in Toranj. She starred in Like a Cloud in the Springtime (1991) directed by her father Saeed Amirsoleimani.

== Family ==
Kamand Amirsoleimani began her acting career under the influence of her father, Saeed Amirsoleimani, an Iranian actor. Her brother Sepand Amirsoleimani is also an actor.

== Selected filmography ==
=== Film ===
- The Crab (2023)
- Angel Street Bride (2021)
- Pastarioni as The Nurse (2018)
- The Death Story of Sohrab as Soudabeh (2017)
- From Afar as Majid's Wife (2006)
- Shirin by Abbas Kiarostami
- Nocturnal (2006)
- Red as Monir Malek (1998)
- Sheyda (1999)
- The Dream of Marriage (1990) as Nahid

=== Television ===
- Iranian Dinner - 4 episodes (2024)
- Chidemaneh - 11 episodes (2023)
- Normal People - 26 episodes (2021–2024)
- Gando (2021)
- The End of the Line (2020–2021)
- Akhare Khat - 1 episode (2020)
- Neighbourhood Guy - 1 episode (2020)
- In Search of Peace (2017)
- The Enigma of the Shah (2016–2017)
- Dorehami (I-15, 2016)
- I'm Just Kidding (2014)
- Shiva (6-episode miniseries) (2014)
- My Villa as Rouh Angiz - 40 episodes (2013)
- Hoosh-e Siah (2010)
- Foggy Tabriz (2010)
- Barareh Nights as Kamand - 1 episode (2006)
- Neighbours (2001-2002) (25 episodes)
- Father Salar aka Patriarch (1994-1995) as Azar (22 episodes)
