= Morteza Aghili =

Iranian actor

- مرتضی عقیلی
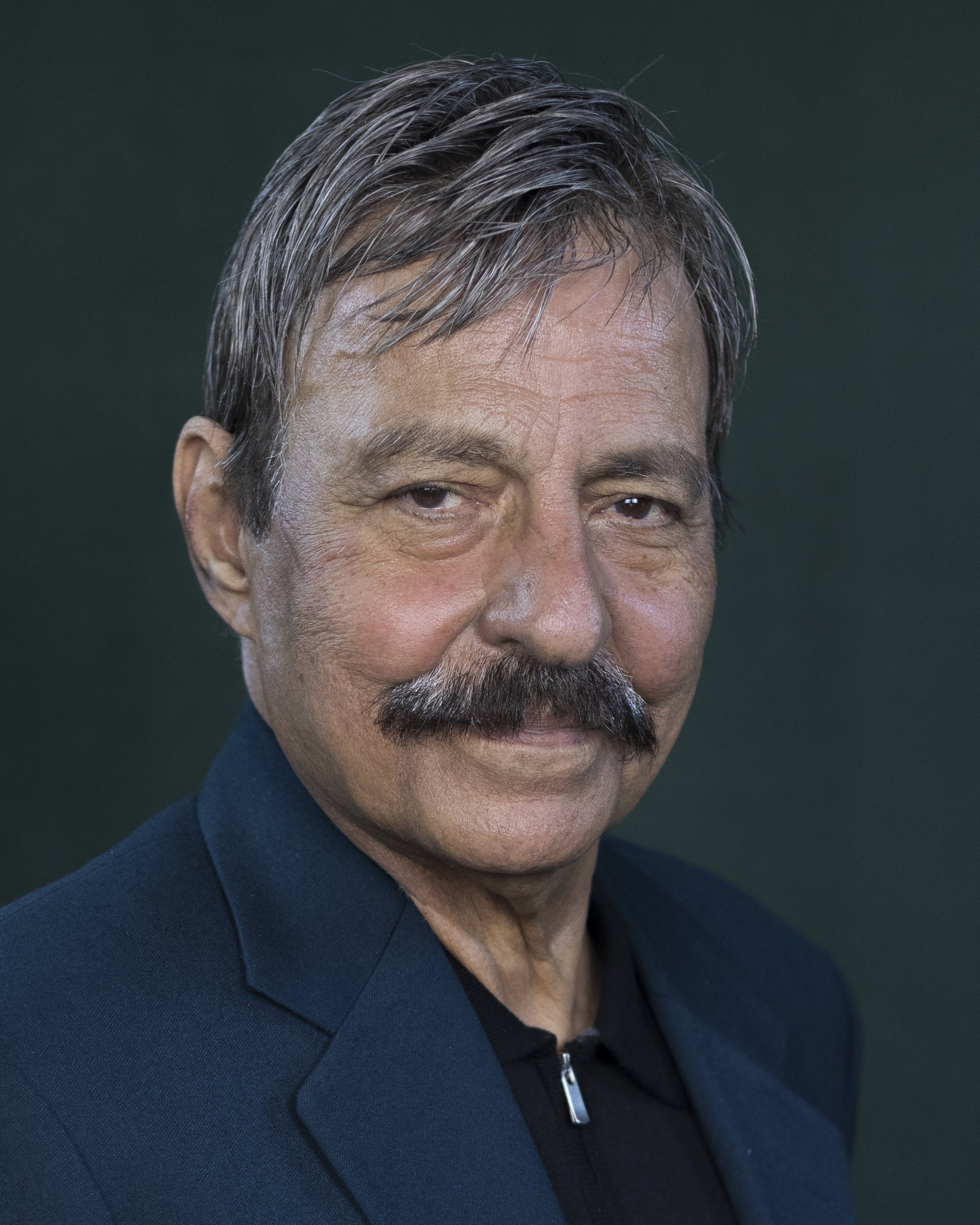
- Born: 11 September 1944 (age 81); Tehran, Iran
- Occupation(s): Actor, Director
- Years active: 1960
- Children: Payam Aghili

Morteza Aghili (born 11 September 1944) is an Iranian actor and director.

He started his activity in 1962 by joining in the Shahin Sarkisian Theater Group and experienced professional cinema in 1971 with his role in the movie Kako, directed by Shapoor Gharib. Morteza Aghili left Iran after the 1979 revolution and currently resides in Los Angeles, USA, and plays a role in some of the Gem channel series.

== Films ==
=== Actor ===
- Beautiful city (2016)
- Rugged Land (2016)
- The Fifth Rider of Destiny (1980)
- Worship (1978)
- Qadghan
- Safe place (1977)
- There is no news in the city (1977)
- Hello Tehran (1977)
- Sunny Night (1977)
- Wounded Night (1977)
- Shark South (1977)
- Paper Flowers (1977)
- Innocent (1976)
- Awake in the City (1976)
- Reward of a Man (1976)
- Award (1976)
- Black Fortune
- City of Wine (1976)
- Gold Heel (1975)
- Goodbye little one (1975)
- Sharaf (1975)
- Distance (1975)
- Oriental man and Western woman (1975)
- Mr. Mehdi enters (1974)
- Avesta Karim Nokrtim (1974)
- Doctor and Dancer (1974)
- Under the skin of the night (1974)
- Hello love
- Cage
- Hostage (1974)
- Passenger
- Mr. Ignorant (1973)
- Shoes
- Chase to Hell (1973)
- Southern
- Fantasy (1973)
- The enemy
- Virgin Girl (1973)
- Rebellion

=== Director ===
- Safe place (1977)
- Paper Flowers (1977)
- Innocent (1976)
- Distance (1975)

=== Writer ===
- Safe place (1977)
- Paper Flowers (1977)
- Distance (1975)

=== Producer ===
- Safe place (1977)
- Paper Flowers (1977)
- Distance (1975)

=== Singer ===
- Cages
