= Kazem Afrandnia =

Iranian actor

- كاظم افرندنيا
- Born: 24 January 1946; Nain
- Died: 28 January 2017 (aged 71); Tehran, Iran
- Occupation: Actor

Kazem Afrandnia (Persian: كاظم افرندنيا; 24 January 1946 – 28 January 2017) was an Iranian ac cinema and television actor. Afrandnia died on 28 January 2017, aged 71.

== Biography ==
Kazem Afrandnia spent his early school in Golpayegan, Amin High School and was a late Masnavi Molavi and sings the prophets and shabans in school. Kazem Afrentnia was born in Nain and educated at the Fine Arts School. He started acting in 1974 by playing in the film "The Unruly" directed by Saeed Moghadlazi and starred in more than 100 films and series, including Sardar Jangal and the shoes of Mirza Nowruz, Kani Manga and Dog-fighting. His last role in the series was the Puzzle of the Shah. Kazem Afrentnia said in a conversation: "I have been in acting for 50 years and I have now been forgotten.We have done our job to take the chair in front of us and wait for the angel to take our death with him."

== Death ==
Kazem Afrentnia suffered headaches and then bleeding and stroke selected at home on the night of February 21, 2017 and was taken to hospital. He was in a collapsed in a nomad after three brain surgery until death. Afrandnia finally died on Saturday morning, February 28, 2017, after nine days of landing in a brain coma at the age of 71.

The actor was held in front of the cinema house on Tuesday, February 1, 2017.

Kazem Afrentnia's paykar was finally found in the piece of artists of Paradise Zahra.

== Filmography ==
=== Cinema ===
- separation (2015)
- Retirees (2012)
- The World of The Pedamid (2012)
- Spherbet and Canary (2011)
- How I Was A Billionaire (2010)
- Soil and Fire (2010)
- Clowns (2009)
- Wesh Moon (2007)
- Left Handed (2006)
- Qalkalk (2005)
- Honey Venom (2002)
- Shok (2001)
- Japanese schoolgirl (2000)
- Shoor Eshgh (2000)
- Sahargah Piroozi (1999)
- Countdown (1997)
- On the Line of Death (1996)
- Tungna (1995)
- livestock (1995)
- Special Guard (1995)
- Pearl black (1994)
- Forbidden Area (1994)
- Storm Impact (1993)
- Blood crystal (1992)
- Rule of Law (1992)
- A Man in the Mirror (1992)
- Operation Kirkuk (1991)
- Deadline (1989)
- Two Fates (1989)
- Death of leopard (1989)
- Yes, it was like this (1988)
- Newsman (1987)
- Kani Manga (1987)
- Little Look (1987)
- Brawl in Tasaki (1986)
- The Ghost of The Ejdm (1986)
- Broken Gun (1985)
- Brawl (1985)
- Mirza Norooz Shoes (1985)
- Hell base (1984)
- Pirak (1984)
- Mercenaries (1984)
- Wound (1983)
- Sardar Jangal (1983)
- Mirza Kuchak Khan (1983)
- Ambassador (1982)
- Afyon - Death Tab (1981)
- Special Inspector (1981)
- Asiangaran (1981)
- From Cry to Terror (1980)
- Commentators (1980)
- Fate-maker (1978)
- Friday (1977)
- Khan Nayeb (1977)
- Great Silence (1977)
- Love and Violence (1977)
- Scream of Love (1977)
- Koch (1977)
- Unmarked (1976)
- boy (1976)
- Kelkel Nisan Khoshgoleh (1976)
- Leopard at night (1975)
- Farashbashi (b. 1975)

=== TV Series ===
The Enigma of the Shah as Hassan Toufanian (2016-2017)
