= Afsaneh Bayegan =

Iranian actress

- افسانه بایگان
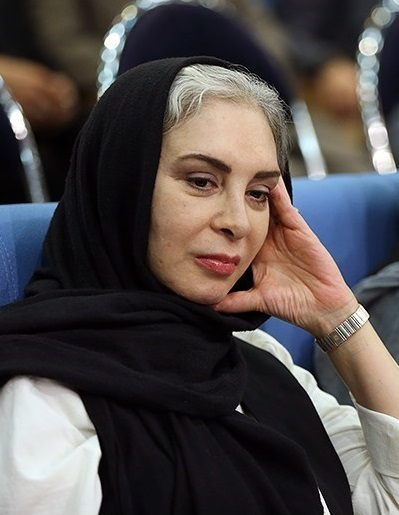
- Afsaneh Bayegan, July 2015
- Born: 2 January 1961 (age 65); Tehran, Iran
- Education: Shahid Beheshti University
- Occupation: Actress
- Years active: 1982–present
- Spouse: Mostafa Shayesteh (m. 1983)
- Children: 1
- Relatives: Fazlollah Bayegam (uncle)
- Awards: Crystal Simorgh for Best Actress 3 nomination

Afsaneh Bayegan (Persian: افسانه بایگان; born January 2, 1961) is an Iranian film and television actress and beauty pageant titleholder who placed 2nd Runner-Up at Miss Iran 1976. Born in Tehran, her artistic career started with the short film Boogh or The Horn by Ali Alinejad (1982).

== Personal life ==
Afsaneh Bayegan was born on January 16, 1962, on France Street in Tehran. Her paternal uncle, Fazlollah Bayegan, was one of the pioneers of Iranian theater, and her paternal grandfather, Mirza Javad Motamen al-Molk, was a representative in the first National Assembly of Iran.

In 1976, at the age of 15, Bayegan participated in the Miss Iran pageant and secured second place. In 1984, she married Mostafa Shayesteh, a film director and producer, and together they have a son named Amir Ali.

== Artistic career ==
Bayegan's first acting experience came at the age of 11 when she starred in a short film titled Bugle, directed by Ali Alizadeh in 1972. However, her professional career in cinema and television began in 1981 when she appeared in the highly popular TV series Sarbedaran. A year later, in 1985, she landed her first film role in The Lost, directed by Mehdi Sabbaghzadeh, and soon became one of the most prolific actresses of the 1980s in Iranian cinema.

She also starred in the widely acclaimed film Let Me Live (1986). Bayegan was nominated for Best Actress awards at the Fajr Film Festival for her roles in One Ticket for Two (1990), The Peculiar Sisters (1995), and Star Cafe (2005). On television, she gained recognition for her performances in SMS from the Other World (2009) and White Situation (2011).

Bayegan took a brief hiatus from the film industry in the late 1990s and early 2000s, as she felt it was better to step back rather than compromise her standards. Besides acting, she also ventured into set and costume design, most notably in the film The Glory of Return.

== Filmography ==
- Missing (1985)
- The Sanctuary of Courtship (1986)
- The High School (1986)
- The Organization (1986)
- Let Me Live (1986)
- The Tuberose (1987)
- The Punishment (1987)
- Tooba (1988)
- The Last Chance (1989)
- Mortal (1989)
- Shangool and Mangool (1989)
- Two Features with a Ticket (1990)
- Hungry Wolves (1991)
- The Chance to Live (1991)
- The Preserve (1991)
- The Crabs' Attack (1992)
- The Splendor of Returning (1992)
- Maryam and Mitil (1992)
- Alma (1992)
- The Simpleton (1992)
- Atal Matal Tootooleh (1992)
- The Stuntman (1993)
- Maryam and Mitil (1993)
- The Punishment (1994)
- The Spectacular Day (1994)
- Strange Sisters (1995)
- Not Forgiven (1996)
- Wounded (1997)
- Tathti (1997)
- The Rebel (1997)
- The Stunt Men (1997)
- The Changed Man (1998)
- Hand in Soil (1998)
- The Night Raid (1998)
- Tootia (1998)
- SMS from another World (2008)
- Shirin (2008)
- Superstar (2009)
- Women Are Amazing (2010)
- Flying Passion (2012)
- Negar (2017)
- Paradise of Criminals (2024)
