= Mashti Mamdali's Car =

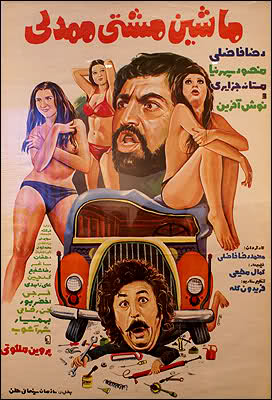
- Directed by: Reza Fazeli
- Written by: Fereydun Gole
- Produced by: Reza Fazeli
- Starring: Reza Fazeli; Parvin Malakouti; Mansour Sepehrnia; Nooshafarin; Shahrashoob; Kamal Motiei; Mastaneh Jazayeri; Nematollah Gorji; Ali Zahedi
- Music by: Jafar Pour Hashemi
- Distributed by: Helen Film Cinema Organization
- Release date: 1974
- Running time: 99 minutes
- Country: Iran
- Language: Persian

Mashti Mamdali's Car (Persian: ماشین مشتی ممدلی, Māšīn-e Maštī Mamdalī) is a 1974 Iranian Persian-language action-comedy film directed by Reza Fazeli and starring Reza Fazeli, Parvin Malakouti, Mansour Sepehrnia, Nooshafarin, Shahrashoob, Kamal Motiei, Mastaneh Jazayeri, Nematollah Gorji, and Ali Zahedi.
