= Hostage (1974 film) =

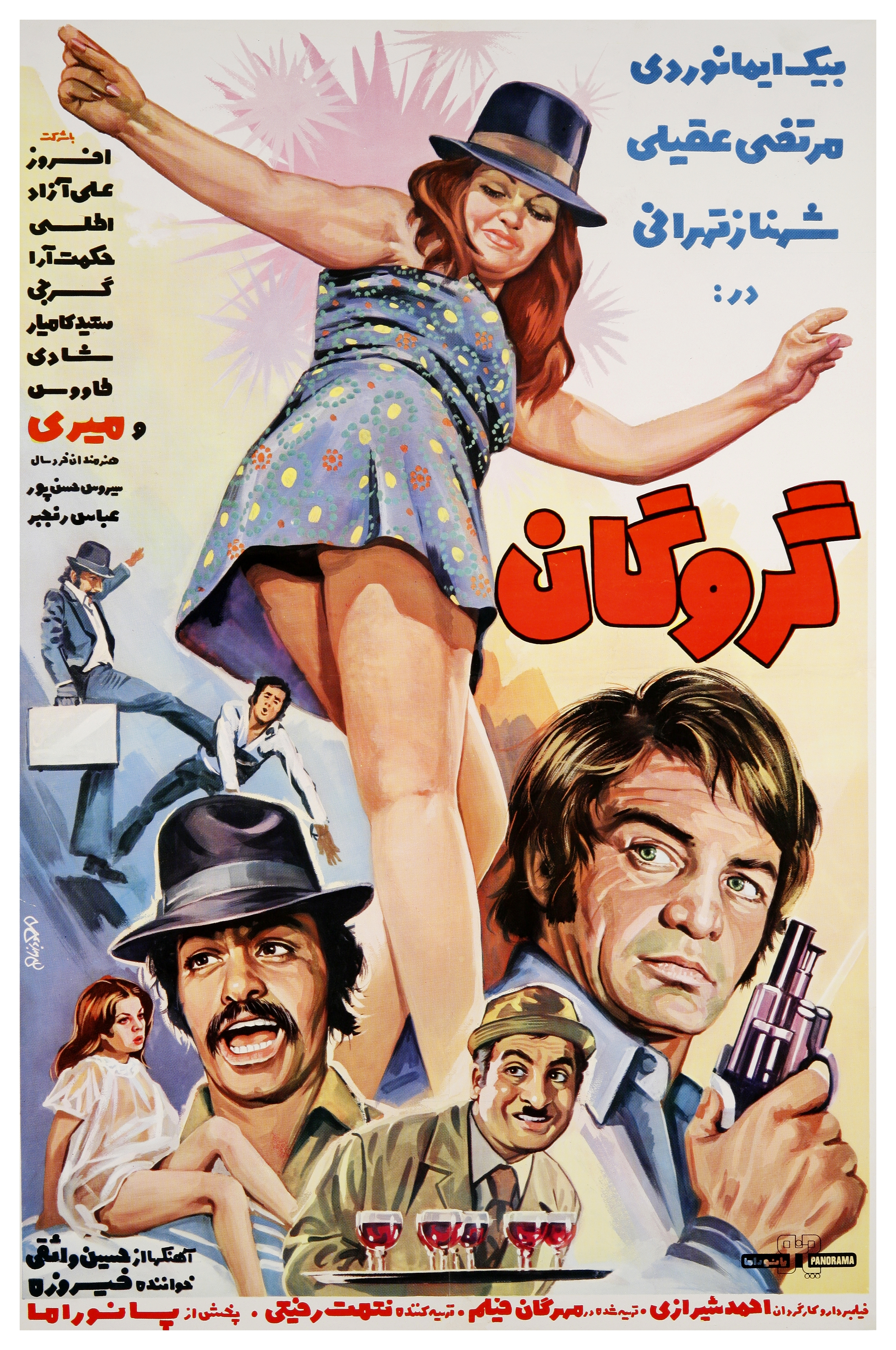
- Directed by: Ahmad Shirazi
- Written by: Reza Karimi
- Produced by: Nematollah Rafiei Tari
- Starring: Afrouz; Reza Beyk Imanverdi; Morteza Aghili; Shanaz Tehrani; Ali Azad; Nematollah Gorji; Ali Miri
- Release date: 1974
- Running time: 105 minutes
- Country: Iran
- Language: Persian

Hostage (Persian title: Gerogan - Persian: گروگان) is a 1974 Iranian Persian-genre drama Romantic film directed by Ahmad Shirazi and starring Afrouz, Reza Beyk Imanverdi, Morteza Aghili, Shanaz Tehrani, Ali Azad, Nematollah Gorji, and Ali Miri .

== Cast ==
- Reza Beik Imanverdi
- Morteza Aghili
- Ali Azad
- Shahnaz Tehrani
- Afrouz
- Ali Miri
- Nemnatollah Gorji
- Siamak Atlasi
