= Matryoshka (play) =

2015 satire by Parsa Pirouzfar

'Matryoshka'
- Written by: Parsa Pirouzfar
- Original language: Persian
- Genre: Satirical

Premiere
- Date premiered: 13 September 2015
- Place premiered: Theatre West, Los Angeles, California, U.S.
- Matryoshka Play on Instagram; Matryoshka Play on Facebook

Matryoshka is a Persian-language satire based on selected short stories of Anton Chekhov, translated, written, and directed by Parsa Pirouzfar. The play has over 30 characters all performed by the playwright and the theatre director Parsa Pirouzfar in its theatrical production.

== The play ==
Matryoshka first premiered on 13 September 2015 at Theatre West, as a solo performance, in Los Angeles. The play subsequently ran for two years in the US cities of Los Angeles, San Diego, and Berkeley as well as Toronto, Vancouver and Montreal in Canada in 2015 and 2016; and finally, after multiple performances finished its staging in Tehran in Iran in 2017.

Matryoshka was particularly important to Parsa Pirouzfar's career. His performance playing over 30 characters of the play all by himself was unique. Matryoshka earned Parsa Pirouzfar the Golden Statue Award for Best Actor in the 35th Celebration of the annual Fajr International Theatre Festival in Tehran, Iran in 2017.

== Episodes ==
1. The Death of a Government Clerk
2. How Dmitry Kuldarov became famous overnight? (Joy)
3. The Trial
4. Cyclothymia (or) Periodic Insanity
5. The Settlement (A Nincompoop)
6. A Noble Woman Who Left Us (In the Post Office)
7. A Masterpiece of Art (A Work of Art)
8. The Chameleon

== Date of performances ==
=== United States ===
- 1st Performance: Theatre West, Los Angeles, 13, 20 and 27 September 2015
- 2nd Performance: Theatre West, Los Angeles, 9 January 2016
- 3rd Performance: AVO Playhouse, North County San Diego, 30 April 2016
- 4th Performance: Live Oak Theatre, Berkeley, 14 and 15 May 2016

=== Canada ===
- 1st Performance: Richmond Hill Centre for the Performing Arts, Toronto, 2 October 2015
- 2nd Performance: D.B. Clarke Theatre, Montreal, 10 October 2015
- 3rd Performance: Richmond Hill Centre for the Performing Arts, Toronto, 22 January 2016
- 4th Performance: Kay Meek Arts Centre, Vancouver, 24 April 2016

=== Iran ===
- 1st Performance: Iranshahr Amphitheatre (Tamashakhaneh Iranshahr), Tehran, From 5 September to 7 October 2016
- 2nd Performance: Paliz Amphitheatre (Tamashakhaneh Paliz), Tehran, From 1 November 2016 to 30 January 2017
- 3rd Performance: Paliz Amphitheatre (Tamashakhaneh Paliz), Tehran, From 30 July to 15 September 2017
- 4th Performance: Iranshahr Amphitheatre (Tamashakhaneh Iranshahr), Tehran, From 17 to 28 September 2017

== Characters ==
1st episode:

- Ivan Ivanovich Cherbiyakov
- Pyotr Petrovich (Ivan's colleague)
- General ‌Brizyalov
- Yuliya (Ivan's wife)
- Dmitry Kuldarov (General Bryzjalov's secretary)
- Zalikhvatsky (Chief of police, the character in Ivan's dream)

2nd episode:

- Dmitry Kul'darov (Son)
- Nikolay (Father)
- Maman (Mother)

3rd episode:

- Judge
- Otchumiyelov (Inspector of the case)
- Sidorchel Met'sov (the Accused)
- Okhov (Lawyer)
- Witness in the court (an old man)
- Witness in the court (a woman)

4th episode:

- Simiyon Maksimov (an old man in the bar, friend of Dmitry)
- Dmitry Kul'darov
- Piyotr Petrovich
- Konderashkin (Nastenka's Father)
- Doctor

5th episode:

- Doctor
- Yuliya Vasiliyevna (the widow of Ivan Ivanovich Cherbijakov, nanny in Doctor's house)

6th episode:

- Father Grigory
- Semiyon Maksimov
- Piyotr Petrovich
- Kopertsov (Head of post office; Husband of Aliyona – the Noble Woman)

7th episode:

- Doctor
- Sasha (Friend & patient of the Doctor)
- Okhov (the Lawyer, friend of the Doctor)
- Shashkin (the Theatre Actor, friend of Okhov)

8th episode:

- Zalikhvatski (Police Chief)
- Dmitry Kul'darov
- Yeldirin (Constable)
- General Zhigalov
- Sasha
- Prokhor (General Zhigalov's Cook)
- Dog of general Zhigalov

== Pre-production ==
- Director: Parsa Pirouzfar
- Playwright and Translator: Parsa Pirouzfar
- Line producer: Noureddin Heidari Maher
- Stage Designer: Parsa Pirouzfar
- Costume Designer: Parsa Pirouzfar

== Cast and Production ==
- Actor: Parsa Pirouzfar (all roles)
- Assistant director: Mohamad Goudarziyani
- Executive Producer: Noureddin Heidari Maher
- Assistant Costume Designer: Bahareh Mosadeqiyan
- Stage Manager: Arash Safaei
- Graphic Designer and Photographer: Sadeq Zarjouyan

== Awards ==
- The 35th 'Fajr Theatre Festival', 2017

Golden Statue Award for Best Actor in Matryoshka
