= Woman, Man, Life =

- Directed by: Mehdi Vadadi
- Written by: Zamiad Saadvandian
- Produced by: Mehdi Vadadi
- Starring: Leyla Otadi; Sahar Ghoreishi; Amir Hossein Rostami; Nima Shahrokh Shahi
- Music by: Farzin Qaragouzlou
- Release date: 2012
- Running time: 90 minutes
- Country: Iran
- Language: Persian

Woman, Man, Life (Persian title:Zan, Mard, Zendegi- Persian: زن، مرد، زندگی) is a 2012 Iranian crime drama film directed by Mehdi Vadadi and starring Leyla Otadi, Sahar Ghoreishi, Amir Hossein Rostami, and Nima Shahrokh Shahi.
