= Sheida (film) =

- Film poster
- Directed by: Kamal Tabrizi
- Written by: Reza Maghsoodi
- Starring: Leila Hatami: Parsa Pirouzfar; Behzad Farahani; Mohammad-Reza Sharifinia; Gohar Kheirandish; Kamand Amirsoleimani
- Cinematography: Mohammad Aladpoush
- Edited by: Hossein Zandbaf
- Music by: Babak Bayat
- Release date: 1999
- Country: Iran
- Language: Persian

Sheida is a 1999 romantic drama film by Iranian director Kamal Tabrizi. It was scripted by Reza Maghsoodi and lensed by Mohammad Aladpoush. Leila Hatami, Parsa Pirouzfar and Behzad Farahani starred in the film. Set in the context of the Iran-Iraq war, Sheida is an example of the Sacred Defence genre of Iranian cinema.

== Cast ==
- Leila Hatami
- Parsa Pirouzfar
- Behzad Farahani
- Mohammad-Reza Sharifinia
- Gohar Kheirandish
- Kamand Amirsoleimani
- Nadia Deldargolchin
