= Maryam and Mitil =

- Directed by: Fathali Oveisi
- Written by: Fathali Oveisi; Jafar Vali
- Produced by: Morteza Shayesteh
- Starring: Afsaneh Bayegan; Hamid Jebeli; Hamideh Kheirabadi; Niyaz Taremi; Shiva khonyagar Parviz Shafi'Zadeh; Mohammad Varshochi
- Cinematography: Asghar Rafi'ie Jam
- Edited by: Ruhollah Emami
- Music by: Mohammad reza aligholi Edik Tamrazian
- Release date: 1993
- Running time: 93 minutes
- Country: Iran
- Language: Persian

Maryam and Mitil (Persian: مریم و میتیل) is a 1993 Iranian film written and directed by Fathali Oveisi, starring Afsaneh Bayegan, Hamid Jebeli, Hamideh Kheirabadi, Niyaz Taremi, Parviz Shafi'Zadeh and Mohammad Varshochi.

This film was showing at Iranian cinemas in August 1993.

== Plot ==
Maryam and Mitil is about Maryam who is a six-year-old girl, living in an orphanage who wants to experience life in a family, in order to fill the emptiness in her life. She must rely primarily on her own determination to overcome many difficulties.

== Festivals ==
- Diploma Honorary for the best child actor (Niyaz Taremi) at the 11th International Film Festival - 1993
- Diploma Honorary for the Best Screenplay (Fathali Oveisi and Jafar Vali) in the 9th Children And Adolescents Film Festival- 1993
