= Conditional Release (film) =

Conditional release آزاد به قید شرط
- Directed by: Hossein Shahabi
- Written by: Hossein Shahabi
- Produced by: Hossein Shahabi
- Starring: Amir Jafari; Shaghayegh Farahani; Leila Otadi; Diba Zahedi; Ramin Rastad
- Cinematography: Amin Jfari
- Edited by: Siavash Shahabi
- Music by: Hossein Shahabi
- Production company: Khane Film Baran
- Distributed by: Baran Film House
- Release date: June 20, 2016
- Running time: 120 minutes
- Country: Iran
- Language: Persian

Conditional Release (Persian: آزاد به قید شرط) is a 2016 Iranian social drama film, directed and produced by Hossein Shahabi.

== Cast ==
- Amir Jafari
- Shaghayegh Farahani
- Leila Otadi
- Amir Reza Delavari
- Diba Zahedi
- Ahmad Nikpour
- Alireza Sanifar
- Shokrkhoda Goodarzi
- Ramin Rastad
- Farshin Tahmaseb
- Vahid Rostampour
- Amir Dezhakam
- Mohammad Karhemmat
- Mohammad Akbari
- Ahmad Shahabi
