= Mum's Guest =

Mum's Guest (Mehman-e Maman)
- Directed by: Dariush Mehrjui
- Written by: Dariush Mehrjui; Vahideh Mohmmadifar; Houshang Moradi Kermani
- Produced by: Dariush Mehrjui
- Starring: Golab Adineh; Parsa Pirouzfar; Amin Hayai; Hasan Pourshirazi; Farideh Sepah-Mansour; Alireza Jafari
- Cinematography: Touraj Mansouri
- Edited by: Mahdi Hosseinivand
- Music by: Emad Bonakdar; Amin Mirshekari
- Distributed by: Sima Film
- Release date: 22 July 2004
- Running time: 103 minutes
- Country: Iran
- Language: Persian

Mum's Guest (Persian: مهمان مامان, translit. Mehman-e Maman, Romanized as Mehmān-e Māmān) is a 2004 Iranian family comedy film directed by Dariush Mehrjui. It is based on a book of the same name by Iranian author Houshang Moradi Kermani. It was commissioned by Sima Film, the film studio of Iranian national broadcaster IRIB. It did very well at the Iranian box office and won a number of prizes at the 22nd Fajr Film Festival.

== Plot ==
Mrs. Effat (Golab Adineh), a mother of two, receives word that her nephew and his wife are going to be visiting. Despite not being wealthy, Mrs. Effat tries to prepare a respectable dinner party with the help of her cinema-loving husband, Mr. Effat (Hasan Pourshirazi), and her two children, Amir and Bahareh. Meanwhile the Effats' drug addict neighbour, Yusuf (Parsa Pirouzfar), is desperate for some drugs after his wife has flushed his stash down the toilet. The eccentric old lady (Farideh Sepah-Mansour) who takes care of her chicken is also not making things much easier...

== Awards and nominations ==
22nd Fajr International Film Festival:

- Won: Best Picture
- Nominated: Best Actor in a Leading Role: (Hasan Pourshirazi)
- Nominated: Best Actress in a Leading Role: (Golab Adineh)
- Nominated: Best Director: Dariush Mehrjui
- Nominated: Best Screenplay: Dariush Mehrjui, Vahideh Mohammadifar and Houshang Moradi Kermani
- Nominated: Best Actor in a Supporting Role (Parsa Pirouzfar)
- Nominated: Best Actress in a Supporting Role (Farideh Sepah-Mansour)
- Nominated: Best Costume & Set Design (Mohsen Shah-Ebrahimi)
- Nominated: Best Sound Recording (Jahangir Mirshekari)
- Nominated: Best Makeup: (Mahin Navidi)
