= Shaghayegh Farahani =

Iranian actress (born 1972)

- شقایق فراهانی
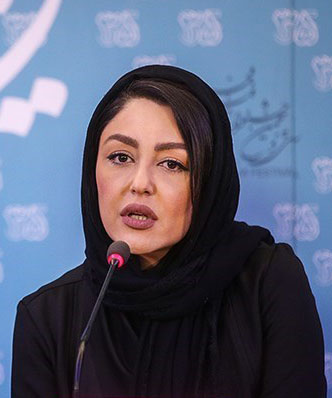
- Farahani in 2016
- Born: 24 July 1972 (age 53); Tehran, Imperial State of Iran
- Education: Islamic Azad University - Painting
- Occupation: Actress
- Years active: 1996–present
- Children: 1
- Father: Behzad Farahani
- Relatives: Golshifteh Farahani (sister)

Shaghayegh Farahani (Persian: شقایق فراهانی; born 24 July 1972) is an Iranian actress. She is the daughter of actor Behzad Farahani, and sister of actress Golshifteh Farahani.

== Early life ==
Farahani was born Tehran, Iran. She is the oldest daughter of veteran Iranian actor and theatre director Behzad Farahani and stage actress Fahimeh Rahiminia. Her sister is actress Golshifteh Farahani.

== Career ==
Some of her other works include Tootia (1998), Cinderella (2001), Butterfly in the Wind (2003), Charlatan (2004), The Trial (2006), Bahareh in the Rain (2008), The Sinners (2012), Metropol (2013) and Resurrection Day (Hussein Who Said No) (2014).

She has appeared in a few TV productions, including The Pahlavi Hat (2012–2013), Matador (2013), Motherly (2013), A Beautiful Revolution (2014).

== Personal life ==
She was married, and divorced some years later. She had a son named Sam at the age of 20.

== Selected filmography ==
- Leila, 1996
- Love is not Enough, 1998
- The Pear Tree, 1998
- Tootia, 1998
- Nights of Tehran, 1999
- An Umbrella for Two, 2001
- Butterfly in the Wind, 2004
- Sharlatan, 2005
- The Guest, 2006
- Bahareh in the Rain, 2008
- Metropol, 2013
- Conditional Release, 2016
- All That Is, 2018
- My Second Year in College, 2019
- Angel Street Bride, 2021
- The Crab, 2023
