= Leila Otadi =

Qashqai actress from Iran

- لیلا اوتادی
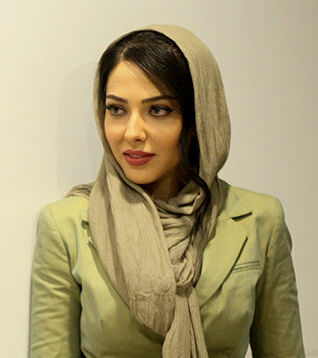
- Born: 5 August 1983 (age 42); Tehran, Iran
- Education: Tehran University of Art - Architecture
- Occupations: Actress; Poet; Architect
- Years active: 2002–present

Leila Otadi (Persian: لیلا اوتادی) is an Iranian actress, poet and architect.

== Early life and education ==
Leila was born in Tehran/Shemrian. At age of 7, she had a chance to begin acting in films. However, her family and she thought school was more important for her at the time than acting. She was introduced to stage acting at the age of 18. Leila's film debut was "Black Eyes" by Iraj Ghaderi. Since then, she has starred in many films and recently became the highest paid actress in Iran. She speaks Persian and Turkish fluently and plays tennis, enjoys horseback riding and many other sports.

She earned her Associate degree in Interior Architecture from the Tehran University of Art.

== Career ==
Her debut movie was ' The Black Eyes' (2002), directed by Iraj Qaderi.

Otadi has participated in various TV series, including 'Truth Revealed' (2004), 'Tears and Smiles' (2008), 'Blood Money' (2010) and 'The Wound' (2014).

She has also appeared in the movies ‘Willow Tree' (2004), 'Left-Handed' (2005), 'Invitation' (2008), 'Looking For Happiness' (2009), 'The Outcasts 3' (2010), 'Messed Up' (2011), ‘Laleh’ (2013) and 'The Straw Dogs' (2013).

She has begun reciting poems since she was 17 years-old, and published her first book in 2014 under the title of 'In Heaven There is No Crow, Nor Scarecrow', which is a collection of poetry, in both Persian and English languages.

== Political controversy ==
In November 2010 it was reported that she was going to appear in a political movie to demonstrate how Neda Agha Soltan was killed on the streets of Tehran in 2009. Since this movie had been funded by the government of Iran her decision sparked a flood of negative emotions against her in Iran and abroad. This was followed by a successful attack on her personal website that aimed to replace her pictures with some photos of the very last moments of Neda Agha Soltan covered in blood. On 11 November, this was denied by Fars News Agency.

== Filmography ==
=== Television series ===
Year	Title	Role	Network
2006	The Last Sin		IRIB TV2
2008	Tears and Smiles		IRIB TV1
2010	Blood Money	Fereshteh	IRIB TV1
2014	The Wound		IRIB TV3
2016	Ferris wheel		IRIB TV1
2016	We Relaxed	Ava	IRIB TV2
2017	Riot		TDH
2017	The Excellency	Motamed	Honar Namaye Parsian
2018	Around Autumn	Shirin	IRIB TV3
2019	Gando		IRIB TV3

=== Film ===
Year	Title	Role
2006	Left Handed	Sara
2010	Son of Adam, Daughter of Eve	Sanaz
2011	You tap tap	
2011	Female Male life	
2011	Page 113	
2012	Mr. Alef	Golrokh
2012	Burnt Matches	
2012	Woman, Man, Life	
2013	Laleh	Sara
2013	The Straw Dogs	
2013	Magician	
2014	Skein	
2014	3 Foreigns	Sousan
2015	Riot	
2015	Nardoon	
2016	Conditional release	
2016	Telepathy	
2016	Melancholy 2016	
2017	White Forehead 2	Golden forehead gazelle
2018	Kativsha	Zhila
2019	Weightlessness	
