= Strange Sisters =

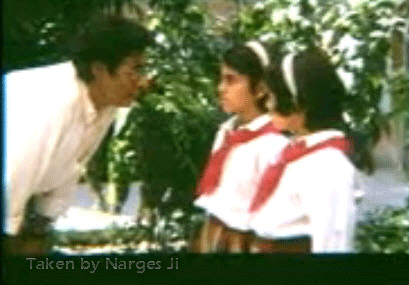
- Directed by: Kiumars Pourahmad
- Written by: Erich Kästner; Kiumars Pourahmad; Asghar Abdollahi
- Produced by: Organization of Islamic Art (Hozeh honari); Kiumars Pourahmad
- Starring: Khosrow Shakibai; Afsaneh Bayegan; Parvindokht Yazdaniyan; Ladan Tabatabaei elahe aliyari Elham Aliyari
- Edited by: Kiumars Pourahmad
- Music by: Naser Cheshmazar
- Release date: 1995 (1374 Iranian calendar)
- Running time: 100 minutes
- Country: Iran
- Language: Persian

Strange Sisters (Persian: خواهران غریب) is a 1995 Iranian film written and directed by Kiumars Pourahmad and it's written and is written based on "Lottie and Lisa" a book by Erich Kästner.

Kiumars Pourahmad won the best director award in 14th Fajr International Film Festival. Also, Afsaneh Bayegan received the diploma honorary of the 14th Fajr International Film Festival for her playing in this film.

This film was a box-office hit in that year.

== Plot ==
Narges and Nasrin are two elementary school girls who meet each other in a school festival and find out that they are twin sisters. Their parents were separated. Their mother was a dress maker, and their father was a composer and musician, but they have never told their kids about this. One of girls lives with their mother and another one lives with their father. The girls decide to change places, and their parents don't realize what they have done, because the girls look very much alike each other. The father is going to marry with his partner, Soraya.

So the girls try to persuade Soraya to leave their father. Then, they pretend that they are lost so that their parents would look for them and meet each other.

== Festivals ==
- Awarded the 14th Fajr Film Festival Crystal Simorgh for Best Direction (1995)
- Awarded the 14th Fajr Film Festival Crystal Simorgh for Best Costume and Stage Designer (1995)
- Candidate at best film in the 14th Fajr Film Festival (1995)
- Candidate at the best music in the 14th Fajr Film Festival (1995)
- Candidate of the Crystal Simorgh for the best sample film in the 15th Fajr Film Festival (1996)
- Candidate of the Crystal Simorgh for the best for Best photo in the 15th Fajr Film Festival (1996)
