= Shamsi Fazlollahi =

Iranian actress

- شمسی فضل‌اللهی
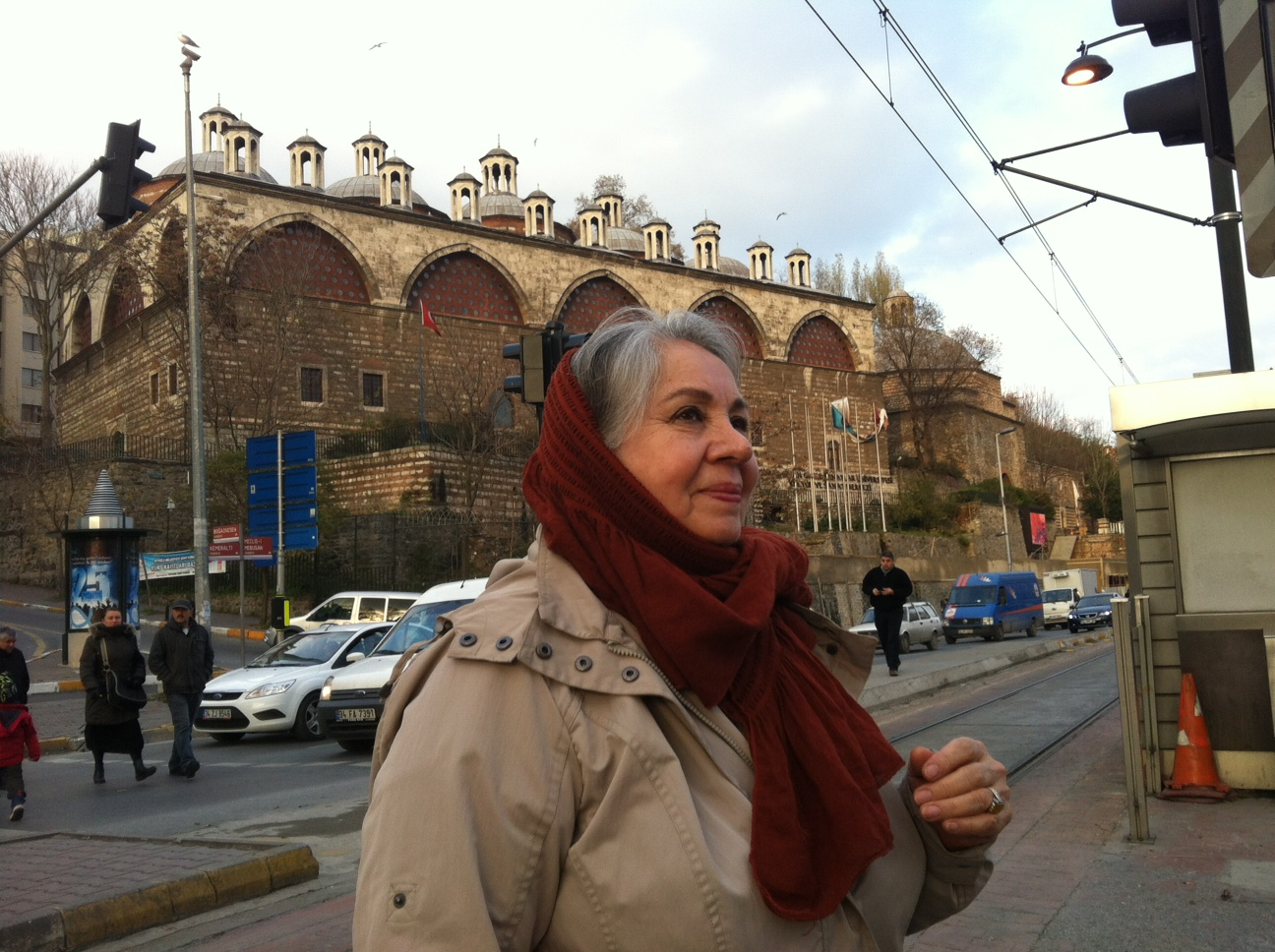
- Born: Shamsi Fazlollahi; December 1, 1941 (age 83); Tehran, Iran
- Occupation: Actress
- Years active: 1956–present

Shamsi Fazlollahi (Persian: شمسی فضل‌اللهی, also Romanized as "Shamsi Fazlollāhi"; born December 1, 1941, in Tehran, Iran) is an Iranian actress.

Shamsi Fazlollahi began acting in the 1950s, performing for radio theater shows in the NIRTV.

== Career ==
The 1960s saw her acting for multiple theater groups, collaborating with prominent Iranian writers and directors of the era. At the same time she also took roles in movies and TV shows. Dubbing for TV and cinema was also very important in her career. She is best known as the voice of Caroline in the series Little House on the Prairie, as Bambi's mother in the cartoon film, and later as the narrator of the Bamzi cartoon series. She received a lifetime achievement award at the 2009 Tehran Women's Theater Festival. She is continuing her work as an actress, both on screen and in theater, while performing in radio plays for the Iranian Radio

== Filmography ==
- Ferris wheel (2016)
- A Cube of Sugar (2011)
- Taghato (2006) Crossroads .... Naseri's Mother
- Ghazal (2001)
- Dokhtari be name Tondar (2000) A Girl Named Tondar
- Chehre (1995)
- Oboor az tale (1993)
- Bandare mehalood (1992)
- Shir Sangi (1987) Stone Lion
- Gorge bizar (1973) .... Maryam
- Takhtekhabe se nafare (1972) The Triple Bed
- Kelid (1962) The Key .... Minoo
