= The Lady Aoi (Bahram Beyzai production) =

- Written by: Mishima Yukio

Premiere
- Date: 1998 (this production)
- Place: City Theater of Tehran

The Lady Aoi (Persian: بانو آئویی, Banou Aoi) was a 1998 production of Yukio Mishima's play of the same name in Persian translation, which was produced and directed by Bahram Beyzai. It is Beyzai's only production of a play by a playwright other than himself.

== Production ==
After about 18 years of no theater work since Death of Yazdgerd (1979), in 1997 Beyzai, at the indication of the officials of the new government of Mohammad Khatami (1997–2005), returned to Tehran from his brief stay in Strasbourg at the invitation of the International Parliament of Writers. He was given the green light to stage a play if he wished so.

Earlier, Beyzai had translated Aoi no Ue, the Noh on which Mishima based his The Lady Aoi, into Persian. Now, finding out that Mojdeh Shamsaie, his wife, had acting in The Lady Aoi on her mind as her graduate work, he decided to produce this play for her. Huge popular interest made this performance a public event: instead of a single university performance, the play remained on stage for months, and audiences welcomed it greatly.

== Cast ==
- Rokujo . . . Mojdeh Shamsaie
- Hikaru . . . Parsa Pirouzfar
- Nurse . . . Mahshad Mokhberi

Subsequently, Mojdeh Shamsaie, already Beyzai's wife since 1992, became a fixed actress in all of his films and stage plays. She had first appeared in Beyzai's film Travelers in 1991.

== Reception ==
Most of the Persian critics and playwrights, among them Hamid Amjad, Shahram Jafarinejad and Hossein Kiani, responded favorably to the play. Amjad compared Beyzai's worldview with Mishima's. Jafarinejad admired the actresses as well as the actor (Pirouzfar) whom he considered less successful, but still quite agreeable. Kiani praised Beyzai's mise-en-scène and minor modifications.
