= Angel Street Bride =

- Persian: عروس خیابان فرشته
- Directed by: Mehdi Khosravi
- Written by: Elaheh Zare
- Produced by: Mohammad-Reza Sharifinia
- Starring: Mohammad-Reza Sharifinia; Alireza Jafari; Atefeh Razavi; Mehraveh Sharifinia; Pouria Poursorkh; Shaghayegh Farahani; Helia Emami; Hesam Navab Safavi; Kamand Amirsoleimani; Mojtaba Shafiei
- Cinematography: Farshad Khaleghi
- Edited by: Rouzbe Kalbasi
- Music by: Behnam Abtahi
- Release date: 4 February 2021 (Fajr International Film Festival)
- Running time: 90 minutes
- Country: Iran
- Language: Persian

Angel Street Bride (Persian: عروس خیابان فرشته) is a 2021 Iranian comedy-drama film directed by Mehdi Khosravi.

== Plot ==
The Mohajer family lives in an old house in the heart of Fereshteh (Angel) Street, which belongs to the family's uncle. Each member of the family makes a living from the space of this house in some way. With the return of the uncle of the family after many years with his bride from outside Iran with the intention of selling the old house of the Mohajer family, he causes big challenges and troubles...

== Cast ==
- Mohammad-Reza Sharifinia
- Alireza Jafari
- Atefeh Razavi
- Mehraveh Sharifinia
- Pouria Poursorkh
- Shaghayegh Farahani
- Helia Emami
- Hesam Navab Safavi
- Kamand Amirsoleimani
- Mojtaba Shafiei
- Fahimeh Rahimian
- Sam Nouri
- Ramin Naser Nasir
- Tara Attar
- Molood Mousavi
- Ava Fayyaz
