= Behrouz Gharibpour =

Iranian theatre director

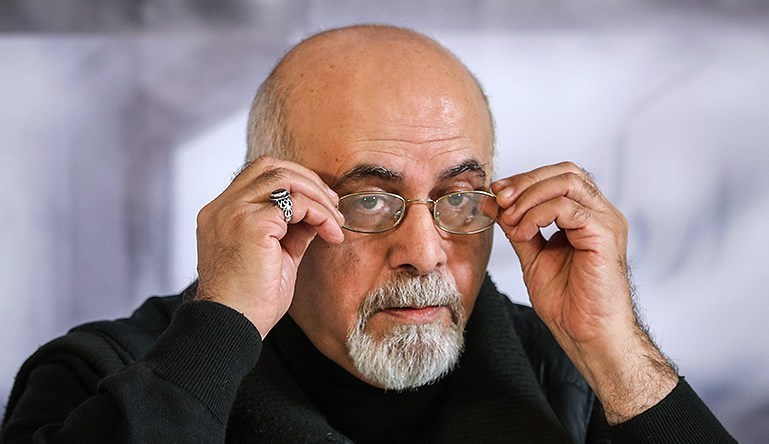
- Born: 1950 (age 75–76); Sanandaj, Iran
- Occupation: Theatre director

Behrouz Gharibpour (Persian: بهروز غریب‌پور; born 1950 in Sanandaj) is an Iranian theatre director and pioneer of traditional Persian puppet theatre.

He studied theatre at Tehran University and at Dramatic Arts Academy in Rome (Silvio D'Amico). He founded Tehran and Esfahan puppet theatre centres and changed Tehran's slaughterhouse into the greatest Iran's Cultural Centre. He has experienced in writing and directorship in fields such as theatre, puppet theatre, cinema, documentary movies, and T.V.

Gharibpour is known for his solid research works on the Iranian puppetry as was commonly practiced during Qajar era. He was the president of the Union Internationale de la Marionnette (International Puppetry Association).

== Notable works ==
- The script of Davandeh (Runner)
- "Les Misérables" of Victor Hugo
- Rostam and Sohrab puppet opera

Ashura marionette opera. As the first celestial opera and marionette opera in Islamic World. Rumi based on a philosophical story of a great mystic poet of the Islamic world. Hafez based on history and philosophical of one of the greatest Iranian poet. Sa, di Based on history and philosophical of One of the greatest Iranian poet.

- Founder of first Iranianian permanent theatre for children and young adult (1979)
- Founder of Bahman Cultural center (ex slaughter house)
- Founder of Iranian Artists Forum (ex Army center)
- Reviver of Iranian Opera and founder of Iranian marionette opera (2003): Rostam &Sohrab, Macbeth, Ashura, Rumi (Molawi)

== Awards ==
- The Hans Christian Andersen Award (2002)
- Sierna d'Oro (Arrivano dal mare 2008)
