= Fariborz Arabnia =

Iranian actor, philanthropist and director

- فریبرز عرب‌نیا
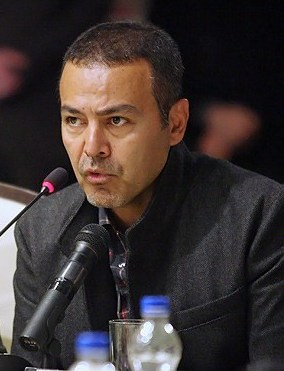
- Arabnia in 2013
- Born: April 14, 1963 (age 62); Tehran, Iran
- Occupations: Actor, writer, film director
- Years active: 1990–present
- Notable work: Sultan, Shokaran, Mokhtarnameh
- Spouse(s): Ateneh Faghih Nasiri (divorced); Asal Badiee (divorced)
- Children: 1

Fariborz Arabnia (Persian: فریبرز عرب‌نیا) (born April 14, 1963 in Tehran) is an Iranian actor, writer, and director.

== Filmography ==
- Wild Deer (1990)
- Contact Good (1991)
- Mosaferan (1991)
- Eclipse (1992)
- I love the Earth (1993)
- The 5th man (1994)
- Kakadow (1995)
- Restlessness years (1995)
- Scent of Life (1995)
- Deadly Escape (1995)
- The Feast (1996)
- Sultan (1996)
- Higher risk (1997)
- Artery (1997)
- World Champion, Takhti (1998)
- Tootia (1998)
- Shokaran (1998)
- Win Dawn (1999)
- Delbakhteh (2000)
- Bitter Almonds (2000)
- Hafth-Pardeh (2000)
- Thousands of Women like Me (2000)
- Gaga (2000)
- The colors of Night (2001)
- Thirst (2002)
- Lead stars (2003)
- A Girl in a Cage (2004)
- Butterfly in the Wind (2004)
- Bargaining (2004)
- Bajkhor (2004)
- Free Peacock Feathers (2008)
- Empty Seats (2008)
- Hot chocolate (2010)
- Earth and fire (2011)
- Secret (2011)
- Blood Oranges (2011)
- Che (2013)
- Gaahi [Sometimes] (2015)
- When did You See Sahar Last Time? (2015)

=== TV series ===
- “Rang-e Shak”
- Vakil (1996–97)
- Mokhtarnameh (2004–08)

== Controversy ==
His criticisms and speech in three Haft television programs that were broadcast live on May 30, June 6, and June 13, 2010, caused controversy. In these conversations, he made sharp criticisms of the country's cultural management and the current relations imposed on artists and cinematographers. He also expressed concern about the accelerated and growing trend of immorality and the rule of lies and trickery on the social atmosphere of the country.
