= Nematollah Gorji =

Iranian actor

- نعمت‌الله گرجی
- Born: 30 March 1926; Tehran, Imperial State of Persia
- Died: 5 April 2000 (aged 74); Tehran, Iran
- Occupation: Actor

Nemat'o'llāh Gorji (Persian: نعمت‌الله گرجی; 30 March 1926, in Tehran – 5 April 2000, in Tehran) was an Iranian theatre and film actor of Georgian descent.

Gorji acted in at least 94 Iranian films, some of which have come to be ranked amongst the most celebrated Iranian films of the 1970s. His last role was that of an old, kind-hearted gardener-caretaker in The Pear Tree (Derakht-e Golābi), 1998, directed by Dariush Mehrjui.

== Filmography ==
- Mashti Mamdali's Car (1974)
- Hostage (1974)
- Youthful Days (1999-2000)
- The Blue Veiled (1995)

== See also ==
- Bāgh-e Ferdows
