= Mahin Oskouei =

Mahin Oskouei (21 February 1931 – 2 January 2006) was an Iranian theater director, playwright, teacher, and translator. She was a pioneering female theatre arts figure in Iran, being the first actress to appear on stage, and the first to direct a stage play.

== Early life and education ==
Mahin Oskouei was born in Tehran in 1931 into a wealthy and conservative Muslim family. Her sister was singer, pop star and actress Pooran (1934–1990; née Farhdokht Abbas Khaghani), who moved to the United States after the Iranian Revolution. Their aunt was a famous classic Iranian singer called Ezat Rohbakhsh (1908–1989).

She studied in Russia alongside Jerzy Grotowski.

== Career ==
In 1946 Oskouei began her acting career, becoming the first Iranian actress on stage.

She later became the first female theatre director in Iran. Her career included all aspects of Iranian theatre, including writing plays and translating major plays by such writers as Gorki and Chekhov.

She was also a teacher, instructing, among others, Parsa Pirouzfar in the Stanislavsky's acting method. Pirouzfar became an actor, theatre director, acting instructor, playwright, translator, and painter.

== Death and legacy ==
Oskouei died in 2006.

== See also ==
- Persian cinema
