= Hassan Joharchi =

Iranian actor

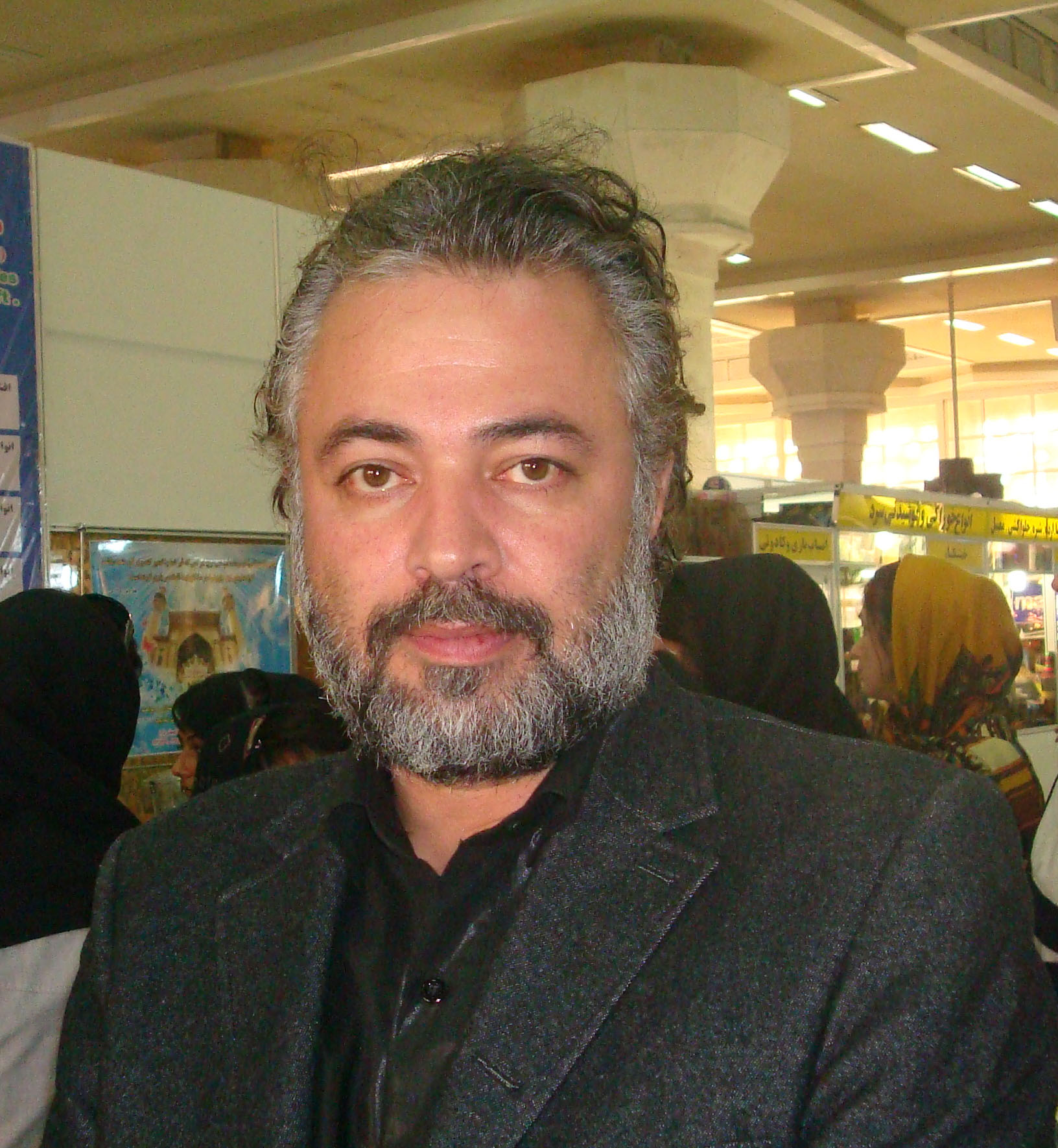
- Born: 28 July 1968; Tehran, Iran
- Died: 3 February 2017 (aged 48); Tehran, Iran
- Resting place: Behesht-e Zahra
- Occupation: Actor
- Years active: 1988–2017
- Spouse: Mahnaz Bayat
- Children: 2

Hassan Joharchi (Persian: حسن جوهرچی; 28 July 1968 – 3 February 2017) was an Iranian actor. He started his career by playing in the movie Elephant in the Darkness in 1988, and subsequently became famous for playing in Collapse directed by Sirus Alvand in 1991.

== Early life ==
Joharchi was born in Tehran. His father(Hamid joharchi) was from Ardebil.

== Death ==
Joharchi died on 3 February 2017 in Shahid Chamran Hospital, Tehran. He was suffering from hepatitis.

== Selected filmography ==
=== Films ===
- Two Women
- The Feast
- The Blue (2001)
- Saga of Heroes

=== TV series ===
- Flying Passion 2012
- Heights Underneath , seven-episode teleplay, channel 4 Actor, director:Mohsen Moeini 2016
- White Nights
- Factor 8
- She Was an Angel (Once an angel)
- Youthful Days 1999-2000
- Kimia
- Loneliness of Leila
- Distances
