= Reza Fazeli =

Iranian film director and actor (1935–2009)

Reza Fazeli رضا فاضلی
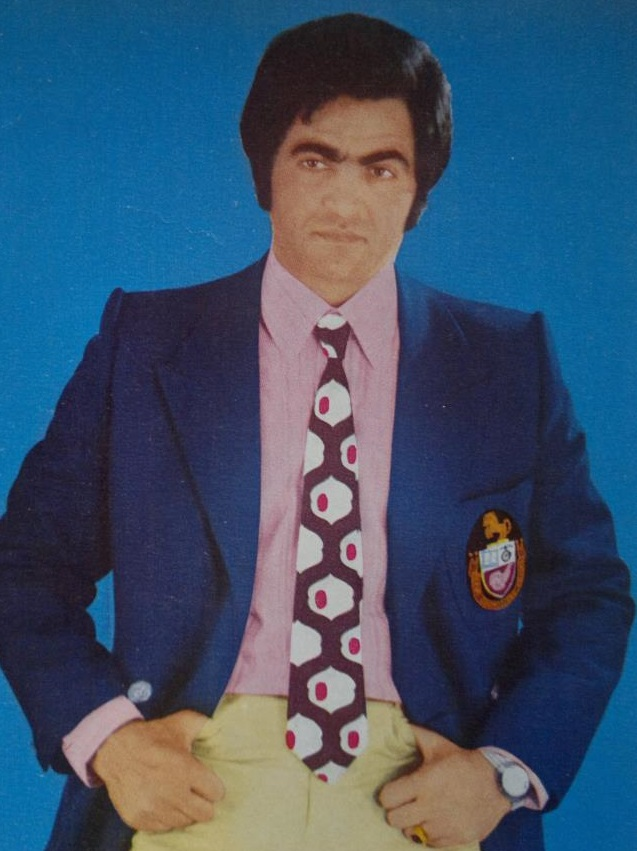
- Born: 3 July 1935; Tehran, Imperial State of Iran
- Died: 13 April 2009 (aged 73); Los Angeles, California, United States
- Website: RezaFazeli.Net

Reza Fazeli (Persian: رضا فاضلی, 3 July 1935, Tehran – 13 April 2009, California) was an Iranian actor, film director and leading opposition figure.

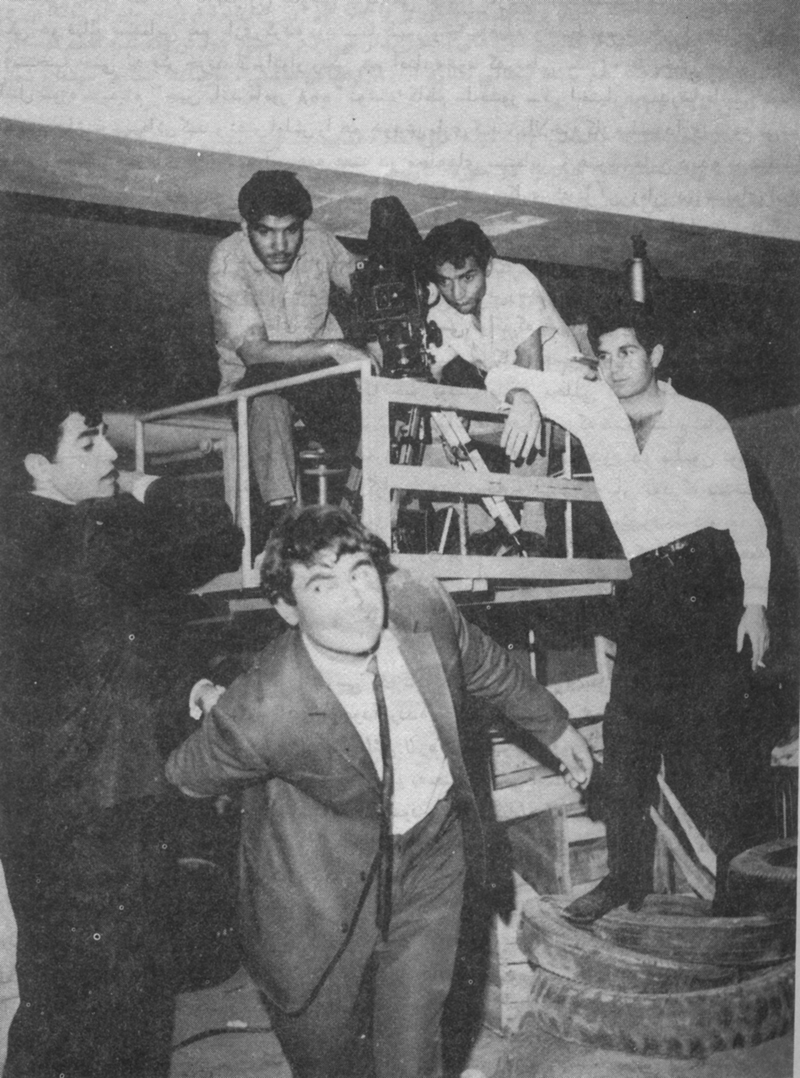
Reza Fazeli, Dariush Mehrjui (as director), Mostafa Alamiyan, Jamshid Alvandi and Rafi behind the scenes in Almaas 33 in 1967

After a period of one year in the Imperial Iranian Air Force he left the country in 1953. In the following years he was in the area of the Persian Gulf as well as in Lebanon and Egypt and finally passed eight years in France, Germany, Great Britain and the United States of America. After years of education and work he returned to Persia. Reza Fazeli made a career as an actor and film director in Iranian cinema and in international productions.

After the Islamic Revolution he left Iran and founded KVC, a company where he produced political documentaries against the new government in Iran.

From 2002 through 2005 he worked in AZADI TV ("Freedom TV"), a political broadcasting service based in the United States and working against the clerical government in Iran. Later, he continued his political activities in another Persian TV channel, Pars TV.

== Filmography ==
- Mashti Mamdali's Car (1974) – director
