= Mehraveh Sharifinia =

Iranian film and television actress (born 1981)

Mahraveh Sharifinia
- مهراوه شریفی‌نیا
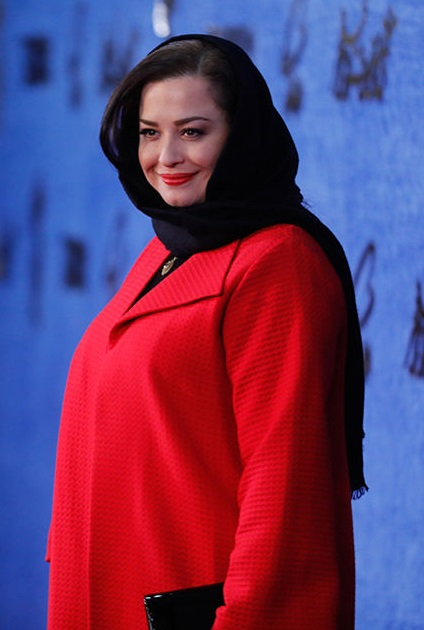
- Sharifinia at the 37th Fajr Film Festival (2019)
- Born: April 18, 1981 (age 45); Tehran, Iran
- Education: Tehran University of Art
- Occupation: Actress
- Years active: 1990–present
- Parents: Mohammad-Reza Sharifinia (father); Azita Hajian (mother)
- Website: www.mehravesharifinia.com

Mahraveh Sharifinia (Persian: مهراوه شریفی‌نیا; born April 18, 1981) is an Iranian film and television actress. She has a Diploma in Mathematics (Physics) and has studied music education at the University of Art in Tehran. She is the daughter of Mohammadreza Sharifinia and Azita Hajian. Mehraveh Sharifinia attended a semester studying film directing, but after consulting with her father withdrew from the study in this field. She is trained in the piano as her specialised musical instrument.

== Filmography ==
=== Film ===
| Year | Title | Role | Director | Note |
|---|---|---|---|---|
| 2017 | Wander About Me | | Ghazaleh Soltani | |
| 2019 | Darkhoongah | | Siavash Asadi | |
| 2020 | The Badger | Afra | Kazem Mollaie | |
| 2021 | Angel Street Bride | | Mehdi Khosravi | |
| 2021 | Mediterranean | | Hadi Hajatmand | |

=== Television ===
| Year | Title | Role | Network |
|---|---|---|---|
| 2008 | Regret Day | Farideh | IRIB TV1 |
| 2009 | The Chief | Sara | IRIB TV1 |
| 2012 | Goodbye Baby | Leyla | IRIB TV3 |
| 2014 | L to M | Farideh | IRIB TV3 |
| 2016 | Kimia | Kimia | IRIB TV2 |
| 2016 | The Enigma of the Shah | Soraya Esfandiary | IRIB TV1 |

=== Web ===
| Year | Title | Role | Network |
|---|---|---|---|
| 2010 | Ice Heart | Shiva | House Show |
| 2023 | Actor | Lili | Filimo, Namava |
| 2025 | Beretta | Niloofar | FILMNET |
