= Reza Davood Nejad =

Iranian actor and television presenter (1980–2024)

- رضا داوودنژاد
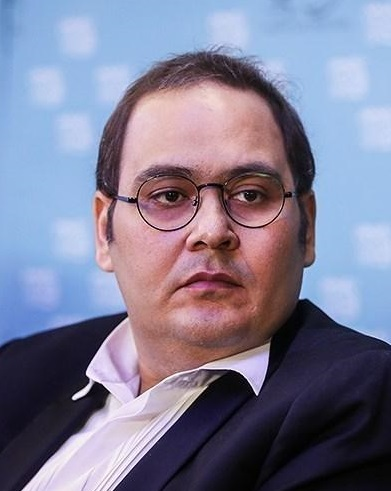
- Nejad in 2017
- Born: 19 May 1980; Tehran, Iran
- Died: 1 April 2024 (aged 43); Shiraz, Iran
- Occupations: Actor, television presenter
- Years active: 1996–2024
- Spouse: Ghazal Badiee (m. 2009)
- Parent: Alireza Davood Nejad (father)
- Relatives: Asal Badiee (sister-in-law)

Reza Davood Nejad (Persian: رضا داوودنژاد; 19 May 1980 – 1 April 2024) was an Iranian actor and television presenter. He was the son of Alireza Davood Nejad, an Iranian film director, and the brother-in-law of Asal Badiee, an Iranian actress. Davood Nejad died from complications of sepsis and liver surgery on 1 April 2024, at the age of 43.

== See also ==
- Iranian cinema
- IRIB

== Sources ==
- Reza Davood Nejad at IMDb
- Reza Davood Nejad on Instagram
