= Behzad Farahani =

Iranian actor and screenwriter

- بهزاد فراهانی
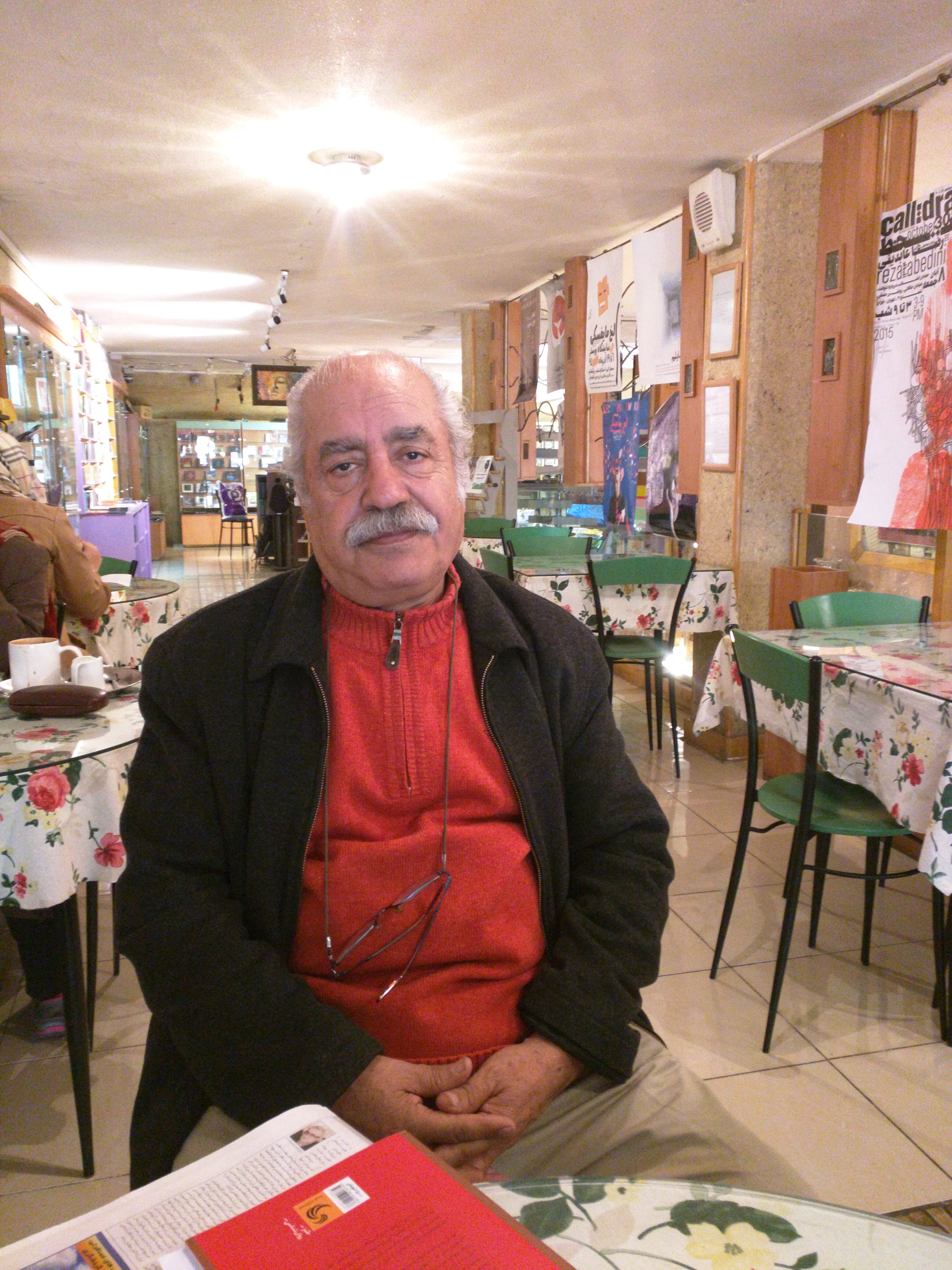
- Farahani in 2013
- Born: January 21, 1945 (age 81); Arak, Imperial State of Iran
- Occupations: Actor, screenwriter
- Years active: 1971–present
- Spouse: Fahimeh Rahiminia (m. 1967)
- Children: Shaghayegh Farahani (b. 1972); Golshifteh Farahani (b. 1983); Azarakhsh Farahani (b. 1985)

Behzad Farahani (Persian: بهزاد فراهانی; born January 21, 1945) is an Iranian actor and screenwriter. He is the father of actresses Shaghayegh Farahani and Golshifteh Farahani.

== Early and personal life ==
Farahani was born in Arak, Imperial State of Iran. He is married to stage actress Fahimeh Rahiminia. Their daughters are Iranian actresses Shaghayegh Farahani, Golshifteh Farahani, and Azarakhsh Farahani.

== Filmography ==
- Violent Punishment, 1971
- Journey of the Stone, 1978
- Wage, 1989
- Zero Heights, 1993
- Years of Restlessness, 1994
- The Kind Moon, 1995
- Tootia, 1998
- Sheida, 1999
- Grey, 2000
- Killing Mad Dogs, 2001
- Left Handed, 2006
