= Reza Beyk Imanverdi =

Iranian actor (1936–2003)

- رضا بیک ایمانوردی
- Born: Gholamreza Imanverdi; 15 June 1936; Tehran, Iran
- Died: 13 September 2003 (aged 67); Phoenix, Arizona, United States
- Other name: The Man of Thousand Faces
- Spouse: Ashraf-o-sadat Farangis
- Children: 5
- Website: Facebook Beyk Imanverdi

Reza Beyk Imanverdi (Persian: رضا بیک ایمانوردی; 15 June 1936 – 13 September 2003) was an Iranian actor and director.

== Early life ==
Reza Beyk Imanverdi was born in Tehran, Iran, in 1936. He found employment at the American embassy in Tehran since he had a good knowledge of the English language. Beyk loved cinema and aspired to be an actor. In 1958, he joined a theatrical group named "Oscar".

== Career ==
His stroke of good luck happened when he met Samuel Khachikian in a road accident. Khachikian was one of the most innovative film directors and screen writers whose films were box office hits of the time. Impressed by Beyk's athletic physique and cinematic looks, it was in 1961 that Khachikian offered him a minor role in his movie Midnight Scream. This small role was the very start of Beyk's successful career.

Soon, his popularity with the Iranian movie-goers placed him in high demand. During the 1960s and 1970s, he starred in more than 150 movies.

He was nicknamed "The Man of Thousand Faces" by the media and received recognition as an action star as well as for his roles in comedies. He was able to reach an even larger audience by acting a comic role that was replicated by Peter Falk. This role propelled him to mainstream success in the commercial movie industry.

Shortly thereafter, he left Iran for Italy where he was offered the lead role in the Italian movie Sedia elettrica ("The Electric Chair"), becoming the first Iranian actor to act in an Italian movie. He also acted in numerous Turkish movies, making him quite well known in the country.

Beyk's success was due to his superb acting and his athletic abilities. He was a professional champion of catch wrestling, and he trained and coached rigorously in several athletic clubs in Tehran. He was a stunt performer who excelled in martial arts and one of the few actors to have performed all of his own film stunts. He eventually used his sport to elevate and enhance the fighting scenes in Iranian cinema. Beyk established his own film studio named "Studio RB" and started producing and directing his own movies in addition to acting.

== Later career ==
Beyk, like other stars of Iranian cinema, had been forbidden to act following the Islamic Revolution, thus forcing him to leave the country. He first emigrated to Germany, then to the United States, where he worked as a truck driver for over a decade.

== Death ==
In 2002, he was diagnosed with lung cancer. He died on September 13, 2003.

== Selected filmography ==
- Roozha-ye Bikhabari (1979)
- Babanın Evlatlari (1977)
- Fırtına (1977)
- Sobh-e Khakestar (1977)
- Vaseteha (1977)
- Şeref Sözü (1977)
- Küçük Ev (1977)
- Kader Bağlayınca (1976)
- The Crookes (1974)
- Hostage (1974)
- Gol Pari Joon (1974)
- La legge della Camorra (1973)
- Ayyoob (1971)
- Fatehine Sahra (1971)
- Mardan-e Sahar (1971)
- Pahlevan Mofrad (1971)
- Sedia Elettrica (1969)
- Ruspi (1969)
- Nabarde ghoolha (1965)
- Donyaye Poul (1965)
- Jallad (1965)
- Zan va Arousakhayash (1965)
- Daghe Nang (1965)
- Sarsam (1965)
- Sarkesh (1965)
- Setarehe Sahra (1964)
- Babre Ring (1964)
- Sheitan dar Mizanad (1964)
- Golhaye Gilan (1964)
- Dozde Shahr (1964)
- Zarbat (1964)
- Mazare Talagh (1963)
- Zamine Talkh (1963)
- Delhoreh (1962)
- Yek Ghadam ta Marg (1961)
- Antar o Mantar 1976 Director Amir Shervan
