= Keyhan Maleki =

Iranian actor

Kayhan Maleki
- کیهان ملکی
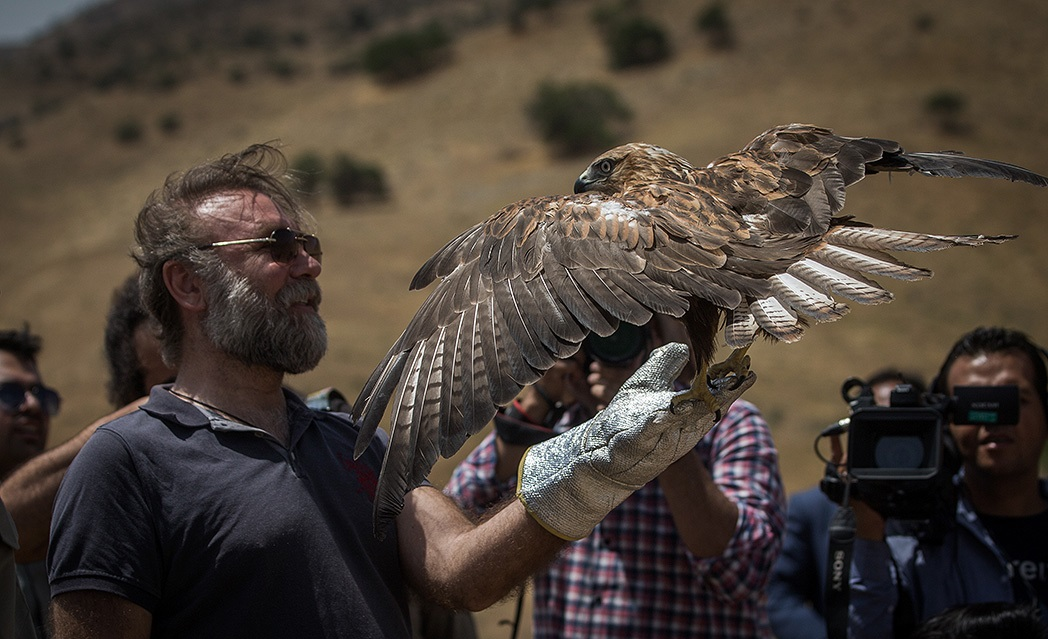
- Kayhan Maleki releases an eagle in Khojir National Park (June 2019)
- Born: August 24, 1968 (age 57); Tehran, Iran
- Education: Theater
- Alma mater: Islamic Azad University
- Occupation: Actor
- Years active: 1978–present
- Notable work: Youthful Days tv series (1999–2000)
- Children: Zharfa Maleki

Kayhan Maleki (Persian: کیهان ملکی) (born August 24, 1968) is an Iranian actor.

== Career ==
Kayhan Maleki began his career in 1978 by performing in school theaters until 1983. He commenced his career in cinema in 1993 by acting in the movie Great Hopes.

Kayhan Maleki was introduced to TV by Analect of 39 (1994) and became popular by Youthful Days TV series (1999–2000). His best performance was in Neibours TV series.

Kayhan Maleki illustrated his successful career in cinema. His performance in Miracle of Smile (1997) and Rainman (1999) are examples of his capabilities.
