= Gohar Kheirandish =

Iranian actress (born 1954)

- گوهر خیراندیش
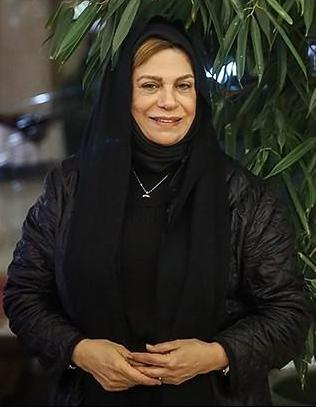
- Born: August 3, 1954 (age 72); Neyriz, Fars Province, Iran
- Education: Tehran University of Art - Acting
- Occupations: Actress, Lecturer, Radio Broadcaster
- Years active: 1970–present
- Spouse: Jamshid EsmaeelKhani
- Children: 3

Gohar Kheirandish (Persian: گوهر خیراندیش; born August 3, 1954) is an Iranian actress and was born in Neyriz.

== Life and career ==
While studying and working in Tehran, Kheirandish started working in television. Her first film, Days of Waiting, was directed by Asghar Hashemi. She then appeared in Lady, directed by Dariush Mehrjoyi.

In 2003, she was sentenced to 74 lashes for kissing a male director on the forehead at an awards ceremony in Yzad.

She was honored with a lifetime achievement award in 2015 from the Iranian Film Festival in San Francisco.

== Filmography ==
- 1987 Days of Waiting
- 1988 The Branches of Willow
- 1989 Zir-e bamha-ye shahr
- 1989 The Grand Day
- 1989 Shab-e hadese
- 1991 Madreseye piremardha
- 1991 The Shadow of Imagination
- 1994 Boo-ye khosh-e zendegi
- 1994 A Man, a Bear
- 1995 Chehre
- 1997 Saghar
- 1999 Baanoo
- 1999 Sheida
- 2000 The Mix
- 2001 Morabbaye shirin
- 2002 Low Heights
- 2002 Nan va eshgh va motor 1000
- 2002 Thirteen Cats on the Gabled Roof
- 2003 The Fifth Reaction
- 2003 Donya
- 2004 Tradition of Lover Killing
- 2005 Maxx
- 2006 Unfaithful
- 2007 Ghaedeye bazi
- 2007 The Forbidden Fruit (TV Series)
- 2007 The Trial
- 2008 Tambourine
- 2008 Shirin
- 2008 Invitation
- 2009 Heartbroken
- 2010 Setayesh Part 1 (TV Series)
- 2010 Mokhtarnameh (TV Series)
- 2010 Dar Rah Vila (Video short)
- 2011 Along City
- 2011 Smiling in the Rain
- 2011 Okhtapus
- 2012 Octopus1: White forehead
- 2012 Migren
- 2012 Growing in the Wind
- 2013 Tehran 1500
- 2014 Azar, Shahdokht Parviz and Others
- 2014 Negar's Role
- 2014 Crazy
- 2015 Iran Burger
- 2018 Pastarioni
- 2019 The Good, The Bad, The Corny 2: Secret Army
- 2020 The Badger
- 2023 The Crab

== Theatre ==
- Khaak: Soil 1970
- Mozerat Dokhaniyat: Negative effects of Carcinogens 1970
- Afsaneh Vafa: Vafa's Legend 1972
- Shahr-e bidar: Woken City 1972
- Nabegeyi az dodeman ariarmaneh: A genius from Ariarmaneh Clan 1973
- Mar dar Austin: Snake in Sleeve 1973
- Rostam-o Sohrab: Rostam & Sohrab 1973
- Pahlevan Kachal: The Bald Paladin 1974
- Az No: From the top 1975
- Mostajer: The tenant 1976
- Adab-e mmard beh ze dowlat-e ou-st: One's manners Matter more than one's wealth 1979
- Ghahveh Khaneyi dar Akhar Zaman: A coffee Shop at the end of the Time 1977
- Bolbol Sargashteh: Perplexed Nightingale 1979
- Vazir Khan Lankaran: Minister Khan Lankaran 1979
- Cheshm dar barabar-e cheshm: An eye for an eye 1972
- Khers neveshteh: Written Bear 1980
- Khastegari: Marriage Proposal 1980
- Parvaneh Mofaregi: The Carefree Butterfly 1980
- Gorg: Wolf 1979
- Dikteh va Zaviye: Spelling and Angles 1977
- Shoyok dar Jang-e Jahani-ye Dovvom: Shoyok in World War II 1981
- Anjelica: Anjelica 1979
- Herrati va Koryani: Herrati & Koryani 1982
- Hemaseh Naneh Khazireh: The Epic of Nana Khazireh 1980
- Terazhedi-ye Kasra: Kasra's Tragedy 1982
- Gharneshinan: Cave people 1986
- Mosta'jer-e jadid: New Tenant 1988
- Tokayi dar ghafas: Tokayi in cage 1972
- Mahi Siyah-e Kouchoulou: Little Black Fish 1971
- Khorshid Khanom: Mrs. Sun 1971
- Hasanak Kojayi?: Where are you Hasanak? 1971
- Gol oumad bahar oumad: Flowers Bloomed and Spring Came with it 1970
- Mehman-ha-ye nakhandeh: Unexpected Guests 1970
- Bloog: Puberty 1979
- Tourandokht: Tourandokht 1996
- Gozaresh-e mahramaneh-ye Octavia: Octavia's Secret Brief 1970
- Charkheh-ye âtash: The Cycle of Fire 1999
- Roozi Roozegari Abadan: Once upon a time in Abadan... 1999

== Television ==
- Aaeenihe 1985
- Modarres: Modarres 1986
- een Sharh Binahayat: This Endless Explanation 1987
- Roozi Roozgari: Once upon a Time 1992
- Roozegar Vasl: The days of Togetherness 1992
- Hobaba: Bubble 1994
- Zir Gonbad Kabod: Under the red Sky 1995
- Do Panjereh: Two Windows 1995
- Bibi Yon: Bibi Yon/nana yon 1995
- Ashpaz bash: the Head Chef 1995
- Siyah, Sefid, Khakestari: Black, White, Grey 1997
- Majarahaye Khanevadeh tamadon: The Adventures of Tamadon Family 1998
- Hamsayeha: Neighbours 2000
- Khaneh Ma: Our Home 2000
- Safar Sabz: Green journey 2002
- Jazireye Jado: The Magical Island 2003
- Miveh Mamnohe: Forbidden Fruit 2007
- Ashkha va Labkhandha: Tears and Smiles 2007
- Mokhtarnameh 2010–2011
- Hamchon Sarve: Cypress alike 2010
- Bacheha Negah Mikonand: Children watching 2009
- Naz va Niyaz: Pray and worship 2011
- Alafzar: Meadow 2012
- Dokhtaran Hava: Eve's Daughters 2012
- Kolah Pahlavi: Pahlavi Hat 2012–2013
- Madar: Mother 2013
- Ma Fereshteh Nistim (We are not angels) 2014
- The Monster (2019)

== Awards ==
- Winner of Crystal Simorgh at 22rd Fajr Film Festival for Best Actress for 'Love Killing Tradition'
- Winner of special Diploma from 20th Fajr Film Festival for 'Low Altitude'
- Winner of Golden Trophy from 12th Iranian Cinema House Awards for 'Invitation'
- Winner of Golden Trophy from 7th Iranian Cinema House Awards for 'Fifth Reaction'
- Winner of Golden Trophy from 7th Iranian Cinema House Awards 'World'
- Winner of Award for Best Actress in Supporting role at Writers & Critics guild award for 'Low Altitude'
- Nominated for Crystal Simorgh at 21st Fajr Film Festival For Supporting Actress In 'Fifth Reaction'
- Nominated for Crystal Simorgh at 17th Fajr Film Festival For Supporting Actress In 'Winning Warrior'
- Nominated for Crystal Simorgh at 14th Fajr Film Festival For Supporting Actress In 'Face'
- Nominated for Crystal Simorgh at 8th Fajr Film Festival For Supporting Actress In 'Underneath City's Roofs'
- Nominated for Golden Trophy at 6th Iranian Cinema House Awards for 'Low Altitude'
- Nominated at The Farhang Foundation
