= Iraj Ghaderi =

Iranian film director and actor

- ایرج قادری
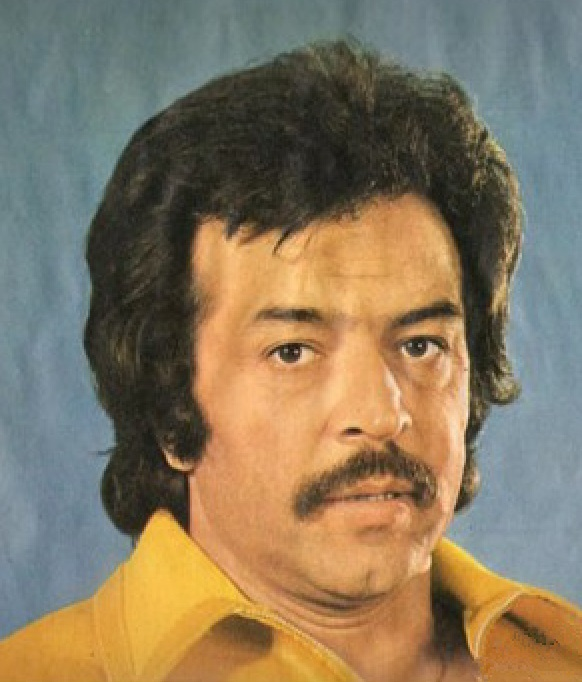
- Born: Amir Iraj Ghaderi; 17 April 1934; Tehran, Imperial State of Iran
- Died: 6 May 2012 (aged 78); Tehran, Iran
- Occupations: Actor, film director, producer and managing director of Panorama Film (the 1st Iranian film producer and distributor company)
- Years active: 1956–2010
- Spouse: Homa Ghaderi (Mahmoudi)
- Partner: Fatemeh Mahmoudi (1950–1953)
- Children: 3

Iraj Ghaderi (Persian: ایرج قادری; 17 April 1934 – 6 May 2012) was an Iranian film director and actor. He briefly studied to become a pharmacist, but soon dropped out. He died in Tehran on 6 May 2012, aged 77.

== Life ==
Iraj Ghaderi studied in pharmacology but did not finish the program. His artistic career began in 1956 with playing in the film Intersection Accidents by Samuel Khachikian. He established the film company Panorama with Moosa Afshar in 1963. He, who is often recognized as one of the major filmmakers of the pre-revolutionary Iranian cinema, continued filmmaking after the revolution with the film Taraj in 1985.

== Death ==
In May 2012, Iraj Ghaderi was admitted to Mehrdad hospital with a deterioration in health due to lung cancer. Shortly after, he died on 6 May. He was laid to rest in Karaj's Behesht-e Sakineh cemetery.

== Filmography ==
=== Actor ===
- Shabake (2012)
- Pato zamin Nazar (2009)
- The Trial (2007)
- Aquarium (2005)
- Fame (2000)
- Dada (1982)
- The Imperilled (1982)
- Baradarkoshi (1980)
- Panjomin Savar-e Sarnevesht (1980)
- Hokm-e Tir (1979)
- Kooseye Jonoob (1978)
- Aci Hatiralar (1977)
- Back and Dagger (1977)
- Do Kalle Shagh (1977)
- Sine-chak (1977)
- Awake in the City (1976)
- Rafigh (1976)
- The Chandelier (1976)
- Death in the Rain (1975)
- Shahrag (1975)
- The Desire (1975)
- The Target (1975)
- Ghafas (1974)
- Mu-Sorkhe (1974)
- The Doctor and the Dancer (1974)
- Torkaman (1974)
- Bi-Gharar (1973)
- Unveiled (1973)
- Atal Matal Tootool-e (1972)
- Thirst (1972)
- Tobeh (1972)
- For Whom the Hearts Beat (1971)
- Gholam Zhandarm (1971)
- Jan-Sakht (1971)
- Noghre Dagh (1971)
- Restless Hearts (1971)
- Kooche-Mardha (1970)
- Wrath of Eagles (1970)
- Azhire Khatar (1970)
- Oath of Silence (1969)
- Dashte Sorkh (1968)
- Separate Beds (1968)
- Shahrahe Zendegi (1968)
- Leilaj (1966)
- The Cry of the Village (1965)
- Branded (1965)
- Gate of Fate (1965)
- Dead End (1965)
- The Girls Mischief (1964)
- The Cobweb (1963)
- Incorrigible (1962)
- A Flower in the Salt Land (1961)
- The Forest Incident (1961)
- The Spring of Life (1960)

=== Director ===
- Network (2010)
- Pato zamin nazar (2009)
- The Trial (2007)
- Aqvariom (2005)
- Cheshman siah (2003)
- Sam o Nargess (2000)
- Fame (2000)
- Tootia (1998)
- Claws in the Dust (1997)
- Nabakhshoodeh (1996)
- Mikhaham zende bemanam (1995)
- I Want to Live (1994)
- Taraj (1985)
- The imperilled (1982)
- Dada (1982)
- Baradarkoshi (1980 )
- Hokm-e tir (1979)
- Do kalle-shagh (1977)
- Back and Dagger (1977)
- Sine-chak (1977)
- Awake in the city (1976)
- Bot (1976)
- Rafigh (1976)
- The Target (1975)
- The Desire (1975)
- The Cage (1974)
- Bi-gharar (1973)
- Unveiled (1973)
- Thirst (1972)
- Noghreh-dagh (1971)
- Sekke-ye shans (1970)
- Shahrahe zendegi (1968)
- 1968, Separate Beds (film)
- 1968, Oath of Silence
- 1966, Leilaj
