= Shapoor Gharib =

Iranian director

- شاپور قریب
- Born: 1933; Semnan, Iran
- Died: 5 June 2012 (aged 78–79); Tehran, Iran
- Occupation: Film director
- Years active: 1972–2012

Shapoor Gharib (Persian: شاپور قریب; b. 1933 – d. 5 June 2012), also spelled as Shapour Gharib or Qarib was an Iranian director and screenplay writer.

== Filmography ==
- Notorious 1972
- The Rooster 1974
- Mammal, The American 1976
- Holidays 1978
- Let Me Live 1986
- The Shadows of Sorrow 1988
- The Return of a Hero 1991
- Our Little Family 1992
- Tears and Smiles 1996
- Youthful Days 1999-2000
- The Sear 2009
- The Last Station (Episode: "The Visit") 2011
