= Mohammad-Reza Sharifinia =

Iranian actor (born 1955)

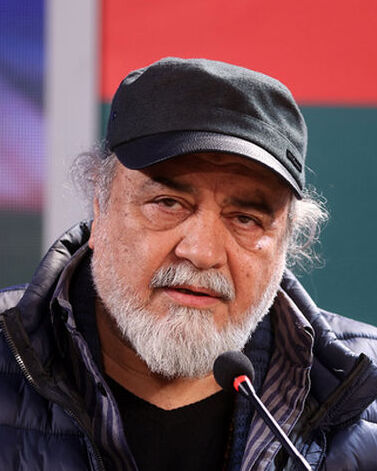
- Sharifinia in 2026
- Born: 15 June 1955 (age 70); Tehran, Iran
- Occupations: Actor, producer, photographer, assistant director
- Years active: 1992–present
- Spouse: Azita Hajian (m. 1980; div. 2010)
- Children: Mehraveh; Melika

Mohammad-Reza Sharifinia (Persian: محمدرضا شریفی‌نیا, born 15 June 1955) is an Iranian actor and film producer.

== Early life ==
Sharifinia was born on 15 June 1955 in Tehran, Iran. After graduating from the Faculty of Dramatic Arts, he married Iranian actress Azita Hajian. Their two daughters, Mehraveh and Melika, are also actresses and have played roles in many important Persian series. In December 2010, and after nearly 20 years living separately, Sharifinia and Hajian filed for divorce.

== Career ==
He began his acting career with Avinar (1991, S. Asadi), and has worked in many films as producer, assistant director, cinematographer, casting director, and has acted in minor and major roles. He became famous after his acting in Imam Ali (1995, Mir Bagheri).

== Political views ==
Sharifinia was one of the supporters of the Iranian president Mahmoud Ahmadinejad and attended his inaugural ceremony on 3 August 2009.

On 6 February 2026, Sharifinia, while attending the Fajr International Film Festival, defended actors and directors responding to the government's handling of the 2025–2026 Iranian protests by boycotting the festival, saying "The children who didn't come here weren't cowards, it's not about fear at all. They couldn't digest this grief, but this division that has occurred in society is very dangerous" and that "I wish this festival could be held as a memorial considering these circumstances."

== Filmography ==
- The Actor, 1992
- Pari (aka. Angle), 1994
- Minou Watch-Tower, 1995
- Takhti, the World Champion
- The Snowman
- The Pear
- Tree, 1997
- Apartment, 1997 (TV series)
- Sheida, 1999
- 13 Cats On the Gable Roof, 2002
- The Lucky Bride, 2003
- Donya, 2004
- The Garden Salad, 2005
- Maxx, 2005
- Guest, 2007
- Marriage, Iranian Style, 2006
- Nesf Male Man, Nesf Male To, 2007
- Ekhrajiha 1, 2007
- Neghab, 2007
- Dayere Zangi, 2008
- Invitation (Davat), 2008
- Zanha Fereshte And, 2008
- SMS from another World, 2008 (TV series)
- ye eshtebahe koochooloo, 2008
- Ekhrajiha 2, 2009
- Superstar, 2009
- Pesar Tehrooni, 2009
- Malakoot, 2010
- Ekhrajiha 3, 2011
- Legionnaire, 2017
- Khaltour, 2017
- The Devil's Daughter, 2019
- Gando (TV series), 2019
- Angel Street Bride, 2021
- Once Upon a Time in Iran, 2021
- Tasian, 2025
