= Ashkan Khatibi =

Iranian actor and singer-songwriter (born 1979)

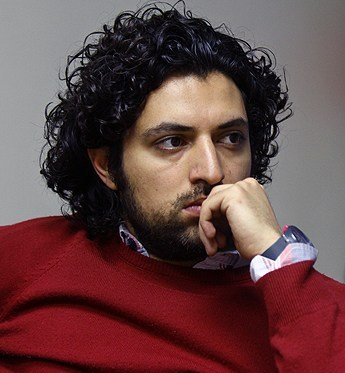
- Khatibi in 2013
- Born: October 11, 1979 (age 47); Tehran, Iran
- Education: Azad University (BA)
- Occupations: Actor; singer-songwriter; director; presenter; translator; playwright; producer; costume designer
- Years active: 1998–present
- Spouse: Anahita Dargahi (m. 2016; div. 2024)
- Musical career
- Origin: Tehran, Iran
- Genres: Pop; rock
- Instruments: Vocals; guitar; piano; harmonica
- Website: Official website

Ashkan Khatibi (Persian: اشکان خطیبی; born October 11, 1979) is an Iranian actor, singer-songwriter and director. He is best known for his portrayal of Shirzad Malek in Once Upon a Time in Iran (2021–2022). Khatibi earned an Iran's Film Critics and Writers Association nomination for his performance in Bench Cinema (2016).

== Early life ==
Ashkan Khatibi was born on October 11, 1979, in Tehran, Iran.

== Filmography ==
=== Film ===
Year	Title	Role	Director	Notes	Ref(s)
2005	So Close, So Far	Saman Alem	Reza Mirkarimi		
2008	Shoot the Target		Mohammad Katiraee		
2011	Final Whistle	Mazdak	Niki Karimi		
2011	Horses Are Noble Animals	The young man	Abdolreza Kahani		
2013	Bending the Rules	Amir	Behnam Behzadi		
2014	Lady	Khosrow	Tina Pakravan		
2015	A Good Dinner		Mehdi Mazloumi	Direct-to-video	
2015	Dohol Song		Mehrdad Motavali	Direct-to-video	
2016	Bench Cinema	Saba	Mohammad Rahmanian		
2016	Soft Voice	Taxi driver	Afshin Hashemi		
2017	Negar	The gun-seller	Rambod Javan		
2018	The Last Fiction	Fereydun (voice)	Ashkan Rahgozar	Animation	
2021	Dear Enemy		Soheil Danesh Eshraghi	Short film; unreleased, also as producer	

=== Web ===
Year	Title	Role	Director	Platform	Notes	Ref(s)
2013	Iranian Dinner	Himself	Bijan Birang	Filimo	Reality show	
2021–2022	Once Upon a Time in Iran	Shirzad Malek	Tina Pakravan	Namava	Main role	
2022	Party	Himself	Iraj Tahmasb	Filimo, Namava	Talk show; guest appearance, 1 episode	
2023	Touch-Move	Himself	Omid Sohrabi	Namava	Reality show; host, 12 episodes	

=== Television ===
Year	Title	Role	Director	Network	Notes	Ref(s)
2002	Rebellious Era		Kamal Tabrizi	IRIB TV5	TV series; supporting role	
2002	A Time for Ashes		Hamid Bahmani	IRIB TV1	TV series; main role	
2003	This Isn't the Way		Reza Mihandoost	IRIB TV3	TV series; main role	
2004	If My Father Was Alive	Farokh Sikaroudi	Homayoun As'adian	IRIB TV1	TV series; main role	
2004	City Lights		Masoud Keramati	IRIB TV2	TV series; main role	
2006	The Last Sin		Hossein Soheilizadeh	IRIB TV2	TV series; main role	
2007	Out of Death	Arash	Ghasem Jafari	IRIB TV1	TV series; main role	
2008	Tropical Flowers		Mohammad Mehdi Asgarpour	IRIB TV1	TV series; main role	
2008	A Fistful of Eagle Feathers		Asghar Hashemi	IRIB TV2	TV series; main role	
2010	In the Strand of Zayandeh Rud	Mehran Sarang	Hassan Fathi	IRIB TV1	TV series; main role	
2012	A Share for a Friend		Masoud Atyabi	IRIB TV2	TV series; main role	
2012	Leaning On the Wind	Mehdi Torabnezhad	Mahmoud Moazami	IRIB TV5	TV series; main role	
2013	Tehran, Block 1		Mehdi Mazloumi	IRIB TV5	TV series; main role	
2013	Relatively Bad Guys	Homayoun	Sirous Moghaddam	IRIB TV1	TV series; main role	

== Awards and nominations ==
Name of the award ceremony, year presented, category, nominee of the award, and the result of the nomination
Award	Year	Category	Nominated Work	Result	Ref(s)
Iran's Film Critics and Writers Association	2016	Best Actor in a Supporting Role	Bench Cinema	Nominated	
