= Mosafer (TV series) =

- Also known as: Passenger
- مسافر
- Created by: Siroos Moghaddam
- Written by: Siroos Moghaddam; Mostafa Azizi
- Starring: Abolfazl Poorarab; Anahita Nemati; Pantea Bahram; Danial Hakimi; Atash Taghipour; Jamal Ejlali
- Country of origin: Iran
- No. of episodes: 26

Production
- Running time: 40~45 minutes per episode

Original release
- Network: Tehran TV

Mosafer (Persian: مسافر, literally Passenger) is a 2000 television series broadcast by the IRIB network. The director, producer and script-writer are Siroos Moghaddam and Mostafa Azizi.

== summary ==
It all starts when Great Ipakchi (Atash Taghipoor) begins to feel guilt while dying. 25 years ago the wedding celebration of the old man's daughter was interrupted by him due to his stubbornness. His son-in-law (Jamal Ejlali) is jailed after a couple of years and his wife dies while giving birth to their daughter, Afsane (Anahita Nemati). The father is released after the Iranian Revolution and starts to live with Afsane, separating her forever from Ipakchi's life. Now, after many years have passed, the grandfather, Ipakchi, is guilty and wants to compensate. So he asks his France-based grandson, Reza (Danial Hakimi), to return and find Afsane and give her all the fortune that is her mother's share. Reza starts his search and in the process he gets to know Manije (Pantea Bahram), Afsane's friend as a child. Manije lives with his father (Kiomars Malak Motiyi), mother (Sedighe Kianfar), brother (Hamid Mahindoost) and sister-in-law (Sanaz Samavati) who are all addicted and outlaws. When they found out there is much money to be won, they join Majid, Manije's uncle, (Abolfazl Poorarab) to plan this. Majid is also an outlaw and addicted and has many plans for Afsane. She has become a doctor and works in a hospital. The Chairman of Hospital, Dr.Saremi (Hamidreza Afshar), wants to marry Afsane and Afsane's friend (Shiva Ebrahimi) is aware of this. Dr. Saremi tries to expose Majid plans but Majid, together with his relatives and Kamran (Fardad Safakhoo), a friend, goes on until...

== Cast ==
- Abolfazl Poorarab as Majid Sahrayi
- Anahita Nemati as Afsane Yaghoobi
- Pantea Bahram as Manije Khakbaz
- Danial Hakimi as Reza
- Jamal Ejlali as Ebrahim Yaghoobi
- Hamid Reza Afshar as Dr. Saremi
- Laya Bastani as Soori
- Shiva Ebrahimi as Mahboobe Asadi
- Sedigheh Kianfar as Ms. Khakbaz
- Hamid Mahindoost as Hamid Khakbaz
- Kiumars Malekmotei as Mr. Khakbaz
- Ala Mohseni as Police Investigator
- Arash Azizi as Informer
