= Shirin (film) =

- © 2008 MK2
- Directed by: Abbas Kiarostami
- Starring: Juliette Binoche; Hedieh Tehrani; Mahnaz Afshar; Niki Karimi; Golshifteh Farahani; Fatemeh Motamed-Arya; Pouri Banayi
- Release date: September 2008 (Venice)
- Running time: 92 minutes
- Country: Iran
- Language: Persian

Shirin (Persian: شیرین) is a 2008 Iranian drama film directed by Abbas Kiarostami. The film is considered by some critics as a notable twist in the artistic career of Kiarostami.

The film features close-ups of many notable Iranian actresses and French actress Juliette Binoche as they watch a film based on the part-mythological Persian romance tale of Khosrow and Shirin, with themes of female self-sacrifice. The film has been described as "a compelling exploration of the relationship between image, sound and female spectatorship." The film depicts the audience's emotional involvement with the story. The story is read between the tragic and kitsch by a cast of narrators led by Manoucher Esmaieli and is accompanied by a historical "film score" by Morteza Hananeh and Hossein Dehlavi.

The film's production is replete with curious anecdotes. According to some reports, the women were filmed individually in Kiarostami's living room, with the director asking them to cast their gaze at a mere series of dots above the camera. The director has also stated that, during the filming process, he had no idea what film they were watching, and settled on the Khosrow and Shirin myth only after shooting had concluded. In Taste of Shirin (2008, 27 minutes), a documentary by Razavi on the making of the film, one can see how the film really was shot. The brief appearance of Juliette Binoche in the film came as a coincidence. She was visiting Kiarostami and Iran as a guest during Shirin's project and became interested to participate in the project.

It was first screened at the 65th Venice International Film Festival.

== Plot ==
One hundred and fourteen spectators, most of them women, attend a screening of a film adaptation of a 12th-century classic of [Persian literature]. The audience is moved by the love story unfolding before them. However, in this mise en abyme, the film itself is presented only through its soundtrack and the spectators' reactions. The director nevertheless deceives the audience, as the actresses are not actually watching a film.

== Cast ==
More than 100 actresses took part in this film. Some of them are:

- Juliette Binoche
- Taraneh Alidoosti
- Niki Karimi
- Mahtab Keramati
- Hedieh Tehrani
- Mahnaz Afshar
- Pegah Ahangarani
- Zar Amir Ebrahimi
- Shirin Bina
- Khatereh Asadi
- Vishka Asayesh
- Rana Azadivar
- Pantea Bahram
- Pouri Banayi
- Afsaneh Bayegan
- Sahar Dolatshahi
- Setareh Eskandari
- Golshifteh Farahani
- Shaghayegh Farahani
- Bita Farahi
- Elsa Firouz Azar
- Fatemeh Goudarzi
- Azita Hajian
- Leila Hatami
- Irene
- Behnaz Jafari
- Negar Javaherian
- Falamak Jonidi
- Hamideh Kheirabadi
- Gohar Kheirandish
- Niku Kheradmand
- Sara Khoeniha
- Baran Kosari
- Fatemah Motamed-Aria
- Shabnam Moghaddami
- Ladan Mostofi
- Yekta Naser
- Roya Nonahali
- Zhale Olov
- Rabeh Oskouie
- Mahaya Petrossian
- Leili Rashidi
- Katayoun Riahi
- Homeira Riazi
- Elnaz Shakerdoust
- Hanieh Tavassoli
- Roya Taymourian
- Sahar Valadbeigi
- Laya Zanganeh
- Merila Zarei
- Niousha Zeighami
- Bahareh Afshari

== See also ==
- List of Iranian films
- To Each His Own Cinema, an anthology film where Kiarostami tells a similar story involving women watching Romeo and Juliet.
