= Horses Are Noble Animals =

Horses are Noble Animals
- Persian: اسب حیوان نجیبی است
- Directed by: Abdolreza Kahani
- Written by: Abdolreza Kahani
- Produced by: Soleiman Alimohammad
- Starring: Reza Attaran; Habib Rezaei; Parsa Pirouzfar; Mahtab Keramati; Karen Homayounfar; Baran Kosari; Mehran Ahmadi; Mahaya Petrosian; Babak Hamidian; Pantea Bahram; Ashkan Khatibi; Ahmad Mehranfar
- Cinematography: Mohammad Reza Sokoot
- Edited by: Shima Monfared
- Music by: Karen Homayounfar
- Distributed by: Filmiran
- Release date: 1 February 2011; Fajr International Film Festival
- Running time: 90 minutes
- Country: Iran
- Language: Persian

The Horse is a noble animal or Absolutely Tame Is a Horse (Persian: اسب حیوان نجیبی است, lit. 'Asb Heivan-e Najib-i Ast') is an Iranian film directed by Abdolreza Kahani. It is his fifth film and was made in the Persian year 1389 (Gregorian year 2010/2011).

== Synopsis ==
The story is about an escaped convict from prison who leaves for 24 hours, and during this time he tries his opinion, the exploits of a group of people who brought toys.

== Cast ==
- Reza Attaran
- Habib Rezaei
- Parsa Pirouzfar
- Mahtab Keramati
- Karen Homayounfar
- Baran Kosari
- Mehran Ahmadi
- Mahaya Petrosian
- Babak Hamidian
- Pantea Bahram
- Ashkan Khatibi
- Ahmad Mehranfar
- Shahrad Radmehr

== Crew ==
- Script: Abdolreza Kahani
- Photography: Mohammadreza Sokout
- Editor: Shima Monfared
- Sound: Jahangir Mirshekari
- Designer makeup artist: Navid Frhmrzy
- Costume Designer: Farahnaz. Naderi
- Music: Karen Homayounfar
- Film Behind the scenes: Amir Azizi

== Details ==
- Genre: Black Comedy
- Color
- Sound: stereo
- Location: Tehran
