= Ali Loghmani =

Iranian cinematographer (born 1962)

Ali Loghmani (born in 1962, Mashhad) is an Iranian cinematographer who is known for his work on films by prominent Iranian directors such as Khosrow Sinai, Dariush Mehrjui, and Asghar Farhadi. Loghmani's works have been nominated for the best cinematography in Iranian festivals and have won some awards.

== Selected filmography ==
Year	Title	Role
1991	In the Allies of Love (در کوچه‌های عشق) by Khosrow Sinai	Cinematographer, Editor
1993	Gizella (گیزلا) by Khosrow Sinai	Cinematographer
1997	Autumn Alley (کوچه پاییز) by Khosrow Sinai	Cinematographer
1998	Bead (مهره) by Mohammad Ali Sajjadi	Cinematographer
2000	Big Drum Under Left Foot (طبل بزرگ زیر پای چپ) by Kazem Masoomi	Cinematographer
2000	Birde of Fire (عروس آتش) by Khosrow Sinai	Cinematographer
2000	Djomeh (جمعه) by Hasan Yektapanah	Cinematographer
2001	The Red Journey (سفر سرخ) by Hamid Farrokhnejad	Cinematographer
2003	Deep Breath (نفس عمیق) by Parviz Shahbazi	Cinematographer
2004	The Beautiful City (شهر زیبا) by Asghar Farhadi	Cinematographer
2004	The Tear of the Cold (اشک سرما) by Azizollah Hamidnejad	Cinematographer
2006	Talking With A Shadow (گفتگو با سایه) by Khosrow Sinai	Cinematographer
2008	Lady of Roses (بانوی گل سرخ) by Mojtaba Mirtahmasb	Cinematographer
2010	Tehran Tehran (طهران تهران) by Khosrow Sinai	Cinematographer
2011	Alzheimer (آلزایمر) by Ahmadreza Motamedi	Cinematographer
2012	The Rooster Trademark Paper (کاغذ خروس‌نشان) by Maryam Milani	Cinematographer
2012	Needlessly and Causelessly (بیخود و بی‌جهت) by Abdolreza Kahani	Cinematographer
2015	The Rainbow Island (جزیره رنگین) by Khosrow Sinai	Cinematographer
