= Ziba Borufeh =

Iranian actress

- Born: 20 September 1975 (age 50); Tehran, Iran
- Occupation: Actress
- Years active: 1994–present
- Spouse: Payam Saberi (m. 2001; died 2018)
- Children: 1

Ziba Borufeh (born 20 September 1975) is an Iranian film and television actress. She rose to prominence in 1998 with her role as “Masoumeh” in the television series Majid Delbandam, directed by Reza Attaran.

== Early life and career ==
Ziba Borufeh was born in 1975 in Tehran, Iran. She is a graduate of judicial law.

Borufeh appeared in the feature film The Night of the Fox and gained further recognition in 1998 for her performance in the television series Majid Delbandam, directed by Reza Attaran. For four years, she was banned from working in the industry due to the unauthorized release of parts of her wedding video on the internet, which resulted in an official prohibition on her professional activities. She was married to Payam Saberi, a makeup artist and actor, who died on 9 December 2018 in Tehran due to cardiac arrest at the age of 45.

== Filmography ==
=== Films ===
- Pool (2014)
- Second Ending (Yaghoub Ghaffari, 2010)
- Blood Orange (Sirous Alvand, 2010)
- The Last Bachelor (Mohammadreza Fazeli, 2009)
- Shirin (Abbas Kiarostami, 2008)
- The Summoned (Arash Moayerian, 2007)
- One Man, One City (Hassan Hedayat, 2007)
- Miss (Mohammad Darmanesh, 2002)
- Unique (Jahangir Jahangiri, 2001)
- Wings to Fly (Khosrow Masoumi, 2000)
- Mani and Neda (Parviz Sabri, 2000)
- The Night of the Fox (Homayoun Assadian, 1996)
- Shadows (Hossein Shahabi, 2005)

=== Television series ===
- Crowded House (Ali Shoghian, 1994)
- With Permission (Ali Shoghian, 1995)
- Under the Blue Dome (Bahman Zarrinpour, 1995)
- Moonlight Magic (Bahman Zarrinpour, 1996)
- Majid Delbandam (Reza Attaran, 1998)
- The Night of the Fox (Homayoun Assadian, 1999)
- Fellow Traveler (Ghasem Jafari, 2000) (Guest Appearance)
- Girls (Asghar Tousi, 2000) (Guest Appearance)
- Taste of Childhood 2 (Masoud Rashidi, 2002)
- The Messenger (Javad Shamaghdari, 2002)
- The Enchanted (Dariush Farhang, 2003)
- Dirty Money (Javad Afshar, 2004)
- Reyhaneh (Sirous Moghadam, 2005)
- Snakes and Ladders (Seyyed Mohsen Yousefi, 2006)
- Jaber ibn Hayyan (Javad Afshar, 2006)
- Time Traveler 2 (Masoud Navabi, 2008)
- Wave and Rock (Majid Salehi, 2010)
- Like Glass (Javad Mozdabadi, 2011)
- House on the Hill (Dariush Yari, 2012)
- Breach (Hossein Tabrizi, 2013)
- Hatef (Dariush Yari, 2017)

=== Television Films ===
- Sokou
- The Sign of Tulips (Akbar Mansour Fallah)
- Sense of Touch (Dariush Yari, 2012)
- Live Again (Seyyed Ali Sajjadi, 2009)
- The Last Bachelor (Mohammadreza Fazeli, 2010)
- Crystal Rain (Shahed Ahmadloo, 2010)
- Me and You (Payam Saberi, 2009)

=== Web ===
- Aspirin (Farhad Najafi, 2015–2016) as Sara

=== Documentary ===
- Love Artisan (Hamid Kaviani)
