= Anahita Nemati =

Iranian actress and model

Ana Nemati
- آناهیتا نعمتی
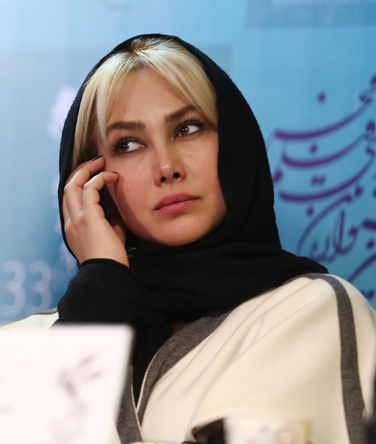
- Anahita Nemati in 2015
- Born: Anahita Nemati; July 11, 1977 (age 48); Shahrud, Iran
- Occupation: Actress
- Years active: 1996–present
- Spouse(s): Abolfazl Poorarab (divorced); Hamid Shahabi (divorced)
- Children: 1
- Website: www.annahitanemati.com

Anahita Nemati (Persian: آناهیتا نعمتی; born July 11, 1977) also known as Ana Nemati is an Iranian actress and model. She began acting in 1996. She first appeared on screen in a movie called Hiva and after that in a TV serial called Mosafer. She is also an experienced and talented dress designer.

== Filmography ==
- Aal
- Payane Dovom
- The Swallows in Love
- Ice age
- Yeki Az Ma Do Nafar
- Penhan
- Yeki Mikhad Bahat Harf Bezaneh
- Hadafe Asli
- Zane Dovom
- Six and Five
- Dar Emtedade Shahr
- Barf Rooye Shirvanie Dagh
- Barkhord Kheyli Nazdik
- Hiva
- Soghate Farang
- Da'vat
- Immortality

== Awards ==
- Fajr Film's award because of acting in "Aal" movie
