= Mahnaz Afshar =

Iranian actress (born 1977)

- مهناز افشار
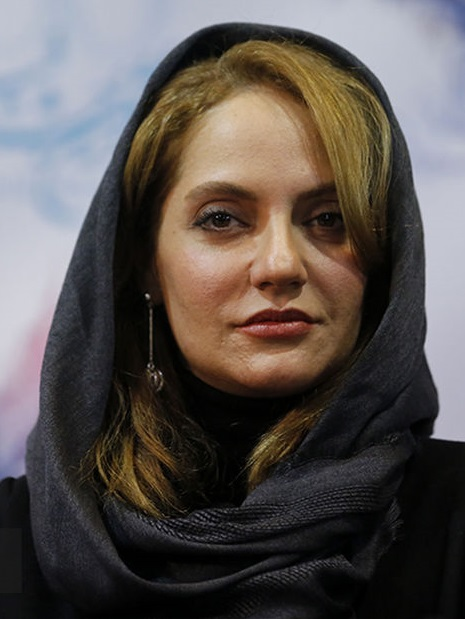
- Afshar in 2018
- Born: June 10, 1977 (age 48); Tehran, Imperial State of Iran
- Occupation: Actress
- Years active: 1998–2019
- Spouse: Mohammad Yasin Ramin (m. 2014; div. 2019)
- Children: 1

Mahnaz Afshar (Persian: مهناز افشار; born June 10, 1977) is an Iranian-born German actress. She began her acting career with the television series Gomshodeh in 1998 and entered cinema the following year with the film Doostan. In 2010, she won the Crystal Simorgh for Best Supporting Actress at the Fajr Film Festival for her role in Saadat Abad. She was nominated for the Crystal Simorgh for Best Actress for her performances in Darkoob (2017) and Ghasam (2018). She is currently banned from appearing on screen in Iran, left the country in 2019, and holds German citizenship.

== Personal life ==
Mahnaz Afshar was born on 11 June 1977 in Tehran, Iran to a family of Tabrizi Turkish descent. She earned a high school diploma in experimental sciences and studied editing for four years at a non-profit institute. Due to her family's religious inclinations, they initially opposed her acting career. She trained in acting under Hamid Samandarian.

In June 2014, Afshar married Yasin Ramin, son of Mohammad Ali Ramin, who served as Deputy Minister of Culture and Press during Mahmoud Ahmadinejad’s second presidential term. Their marriage ceremony was officiated by Seyyed Mohammad Khatami. In May 2015, Afshar and Ramin had a daughter named Liana. The couple divorced in 2019.

== Professional career ==
=== Acting ===
Afshar began her acting career with the television series Gomshodeh in 1998, followed by her cinematic debut in Doostan, directed by Ali Shah-Hatami, in the same year. She gained recognition with her role in Shoor-e Eshgh, directed by Nader Moghaddas, in 2000. Her resemblance to Googoosh contributed to her early fame and media attention. During the 2000s, Afshar became a prominent figure in Iran's commercial cinema. In the latter part of the decade, she sought to diversify her roles by working with varied directors, earning her several awards and recognitions from critics and reputable domestic festivals. In 2014, she played a leading role in the film Moallem, directed by theTajik filmmaker Naser Saeedov.

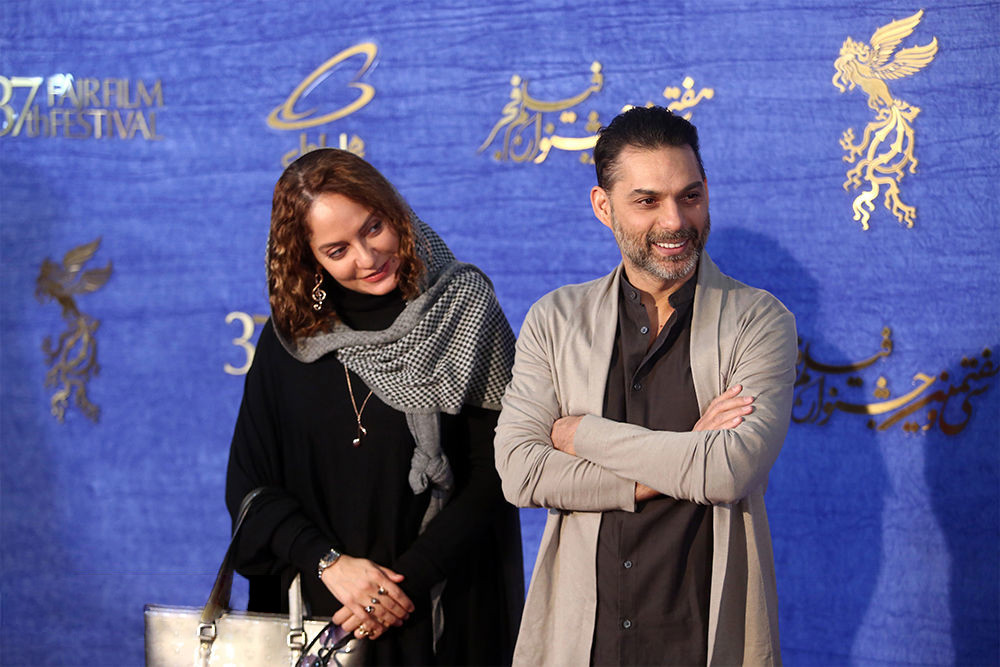
Afshar and Payman Maadi at the 37th Fajr Film Festival.

=== Producing ===
In November 2012, Afshar produced a charity concert by Roozbeh Nematollahi at the Milad Tower Convention Center to aid earthquake victims in Azerbaijan. The event, attended by filmmakers, actors, and athletes, was named Daroog. Nematollahi performed songs including Ey Vatan, Toei Niazam, Agar Ye Rooz Biay Soragham, Tazehtarin Zakhm-e Delam, Bazamadeh-am, Gol-e Yas, Nafas Keshidan Sakhteh, Khalij-e Fars, and Khaak-e Vatanam.

=== Talent show judging ===
In 2019, Afshar served as a judge on the television talent show Persia's Got Talent, which sparked varied reactions and discussions on social media.

== Legal issues ==
Mahnaz Afshar faces legal charges in Iran for supporting the Girls of Revolution Street and criticizing mandatory hijab laws, with accusations of encouraging corruption and immorality. Her advocacy for prisoners such as Yasaman Aryani and Mohammad Ali Taheri, as well as her opposition to child marriage, has drawn significant criticism from Iranian conservatives. She also faces open legal cases with charges including spreading falsehoods and propaganda against the state.

On 2 February 2026, Afshar boycotted the Fajr Film Festival in protest of the government's handling of the 2025–2026 Iranian protests.

== Filmography ==
=== Film ===
Year	Title	Role	Director	Notes
1999	Friends	Sara	Ali Shah Hatami	
2000	The Young Lions	Leila	Mohsen Mohseni Nasab	
2001	The Passion of Love	Sahar	Nader Moghaddas	
2001	Gray	Bita	Mehrdad Mir Fallah	
2002	Gem	Neda	Asghar Hashemi	
2002	A Girl in Cage	Narges	Ghodratollah Solh Mirzayi	
2003	Poisonous Honey	Sharareh	Ebrahim Sheibani	
2004	Coma	Maryam	Arash Moayerian	
2004	13 Cats on the Roof	Leila	Ali Abdolalizadeh	
2005	Season Salad	Mehr Angiz	Fereydoun Jeyrani	
2005	Aquarium	Shirin	Iraj Ghaderi	
2006	Men at Work	Sahar	Mani Haghighi	
2006	Cease Fire	Sayeh	Tahmineh Milani	
2006	Who Killed Amir?	Marjan	Mehdi Karampour	
2006	Trap	Nazanin	Sirous Alvand	
2007	The Trial	Negar	Iraj Ghaderi	
2007	The Boss	Tala	Masoud Kimiai	
2007	Kalagh Par	Sara	Sharam Shah Hosseini	
2008	The Cast Back	Nasim	Reza Karimi	
2008	Invitation	Shaida	Ebrahim Hatamikia	
2008	Shirin	Woman in audience	Abbas Kiarostami	
2008	Tonight is the Moonlight Night	Sahar	Hadi Karimi	
2009	The Day Goes and the Night Comes	Foujan Rahaei	Omid Bonakdar, Keyvan Alimohammadi	
2009	Poopak and Mash Mashallah	Poopak	Farzad Motamen	
2010	Pay Back	Sara	Tahmineh Milani	
2010	Memory	Parichehr	Nader Tarighat	
2010	Son of Adam, Daughter of Eve	Mina	Rambod Javan	
2010	The Third Floor	Young Lady	Bijan Mirbagheri	
2011	Fairy Tale	Sarvin	Fereydoun Jeyrani	
2011	Felicity Land	Laleh	Maziar Miri	
2012	A Simple Love Story	Gandom	Saman Moghaddam	
2012	Wooden Bridge	Shirin	Mehdi Karampour	
2012	The Snow on the Pines	Roya	Payman Moaadi	
2013	No Where, No Body	Sanaz	Ebrahim Sheibani	
2013	From Tehran to Paradise	Ghazal	Abolfazl Saffary	
2013	Good to Be Back	Houri Yasaman	Dariush Mehrjui	
2014	Metropole	Khatoon	Masoud Kimiai	
2014	Alien	Sepideh	Bahram Tavakoli	
2014	Teacher	Hedieh	Naser Saeidaf	
2015	Sperm Whale	Rouya	Saman Moghaddam	
2016	A House on 41st Street	Forough	Hamidreza Ghorbani	
2016	Delighted	Tina	Abdolreza Kahani	
2017	I Want to Dance	Maryam	Bahman Farman Ara	
2017	Gilda	Gilda	Omid Bonakdar, Keyvan Alimohammadi	
2018	Sperm Whale 2: Roya's Selection	Roya	Saman Moghaddam	
2018	Axing	Niloufar	Behrouz Shoeibi	
2018	Pig	Herself	Mani Haghighi	
2018	Los Angeles Tehran	Ayda	Tina Pakrevan	
2019	The Agitation	Darya	Fereydoun Jeyrani	
2019	Suddenly a Tree	Mahtab	Safi Yazdanian	
2019	Oath	Razia	Mohsen Tanabandeh	
2019	Hotel New Moon	Noushin	Takefumi Tsutsui	
2019	Kingslayer	Ayda	Vahid Amirkhani	
2019	Blue Like the Color of the Sky	Herself	Amir Rafiee	

=== Web ===
Year	Title	Role	Director	Platform
2015	Love is Not Closed	Nafas	Bijan Birang	Video CD
2016	Romance	Gisou Barazandeh	Manouchehr Hadi	Video CD
2018	Golshifteh	Raheleh Golshifteh	Behrouz Shoeibi	Filimo

=== Television ===
Year	Title	Role	Director	Notes	Network
1998	Lost	Sahar	Masoud Navabi	TV series	IRIB TV1
2013	Red Hat	Herself	Iraj Tahmasb	TV program	IRIB TV2
2020–present	Persia's Got Talent	Judge		Talent show	MBC Persia
