= Mortician (disambiguation) =

A mortician is a funeral director. The word may also refer to:

- Mortician (band), a death metal band
- Mortician (comics), a villain in Batman comics
- The Mortician, a 2011 British thriller film
- The Mortician (TV series), a 2025 documentary series around the criminal case of David Sconce
- Mortician (2025 film), a Canadian drama film directed by Abdolreza Kahani

== See also ==
- Morticia
