= Alireza Jafari =

Iranian actor (born 1994)

- علیرضا جعفری
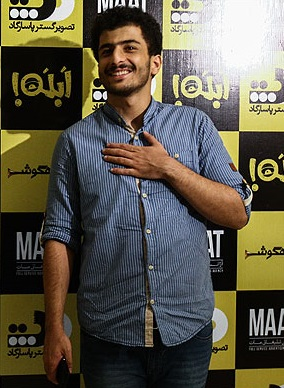
- Jafari in 2014
- Born: 25 April 1994 (age 32); Tehran, Iran
- Occupation: Actor
- Years active: 1999–present
- Relatives: Amir Jafari (uncle)

Alireza Jafari (Persian: علیرضا جعفری, born 25 April 1994) is an Iranian actor.

== Career ==
Jafari started his career at the age of five and became known with the film Mum's Guest directed by Dariush Mehrjui. After that, he starred in many movies and series. His uncle, Amir Jafari, is a prominent Iranian actor and he has collaborated with many artists such as Golab Adineh, Elnaz Shakerdoost, Danial Hajibarat, Reza Attaran, Tannaz Tabatabaei and Tarlan Parvaneh.

== Filmography ==
=== Film ===
| Year | Title | Role | Director | Notes | Ref(s) |
|---|---|---|---|---|---|
| 2004 | Mum's Guest | Amir | Dariush Mehrjui | | |
| 2006 | Unfaithful | Javad | Asghar Naimi | | |
| 2013 | Good to Be Back | Abdi | Dariush Mehrjui | | |
| 2017 | Another One's House | Hormoz | Behnoosh Sadeghi | | |
| 2019 | Revulsion | | Reza Nejati | Short film | |
| 2023 | Hook | | Hossein Rigi | | |

=== Web ===
| Year | Title | Role | Director | Notes | Platform | Ref(s) |
|---|---|---|---|---|---|---|
| 2013–2014 | King of Ear | Milad Shoja'at | Davood Mirbagheri | Main role | Video CD | |
| 2021 | Siavash | Jalal Tadayon | Soroush Mohammadzadeh | Main role | Namava | |
| 2022 | Lily's Turn | Farshid | Rouhollah Hejazi | Supporting role | Namava | |
| 2024 | The Asphalt Jungle | Amir Jalali | Pejman Teymourtash | Main role | Namava | |
| 2025 | Beretta | Siavash | Amir Hossein Torabi | Supporting role | FILMNET | |

=== Television ===
- Ferris wheel (TV series) directed by Aziz Allah Hamidnejad
- Hasht Behesht (TV series) directed by Saeed Alemzadeh
- The Accused Escaped (TV series) directed by Reza Attaran
- Acacia Alley (TV series) directed by Reza Attaran
