= I Feel Sleepy =

2012 Iranian film by Reza Attaran

- Film poster
- Persian: خوابم می‌آد
- Directed by: Reza Attaran
- Written by: Ahmad Rafizadeh
- Produced by: Mohammadreza Takhtkeshian
- Starring: Reza Attaran; Akbar Abdi; Merila Zarei; Vishka Asayesh; Fatemeh Hashemi
- Edited by: Reza Attaran
- Music by: Hamidrreza Sadri
- Release date: 4 April 2012 (Iran)
- Running time: 90 minutes
- Country: Iran
- Language: Persian

I Feel Sleepy (Persian: خوابم می‌آد, romanized: Khabam Miad) is a 2012 Iranian comedy film directed by Reza Attaran. In the film, the male actor Akbar Abdi portrays an old woman.

== Plot ==
Reza is a middle-aged teacher who has trouble communicating with women, but has now fallen in love with a saleswoman.

== Cast ==
- Reza Attaran
- Akbar Abdi
- Merila Zarei
- Vishka Asayesh
- Nasser Gitijah
- Soroush Sehhat
- Fatemeh Hashemi
- Asghar Samsarzadeh
- Hossein Mohebhaheri
- Khodadad Azizi
- Ezzatullah Mehravaran

== Awards ==
- Crystal Simorgh for best directing (Reza Attaran) in Fajr International Film Festival
- Crystal Simorgh for best supporting actor (Akbar Abdi) in Fajr International Film Festival
