= No Men Allowed =

- Film poster
- Directed by: Rambod Javan
- Written by: Peyman Ghasemkhani
- Produced by: Ali Sartipi; Manijeh Hekmat
- Starring: Vishka Asayesh; Reza Attaran; Mani Haghighi; Pegah Ahangarani
- Cinematography: Davood Amiri
- Edited by: Mostafa Kherghepoosh
- Music by: Heydar Sajedi
- Release dates: February 1, 2011 (FIFF); June 15, 2011 (Iran)
- Running time: 102 minutes
- Country: Iran
- Language: Persian
- Box office: 5.1 billion toman

No Men Allowed (Persian: ورود آقایان ممنوع, romanized: Vorud-e-Aghayan Mamnu') is a 2011 Iranian comedy film directed by Rambod Javan and written by Peyman Ghasemkhani. The film screened for the first time at the 29th Fajr Film Festival and received an award and a nomination.

== Premise ==
The principal of a private girls' high school strongly opposes men entering her school. But when the chemistry teacher of the Olympiad students takes six months off due to childbirth, she is forced to bring a substitute teacher to the high school. When her efforts to find a female substitute Olympiad teacher in the middle of the school year fail, she has to accept a male teacher as the only option.

== Cast ==
- Vishka Asayesh as Bita Darabi
- Reza Attaran as Vahid Jebeli
- Mani Haghighi as Faramarz Shapouri
- Pegah Ahangarani as Parya Shapouri
- Setareh Pesyani as Reyhaneh
- Bahareh Rahnama as Yasaman Aghasi
- Ali Sadeghi as Driver
- Falamak Joneidi asa Shahla Nazerzadeh
- Hadis Miramini as Zhina
- Mehrnaz Bayat as Mahshid
- Parinaz Izadyar as Sahar
- Zohreh Hamidi as Mrs. Yazdanpanah
- Siavash Cheraghi Pour as Mr. Rezaeian
- Katayun Amir Ebrahimi as Jebeli's Mother
- Behrang Tofighi as Driver

== Reception ==
=== Accolades ===
| Year | Award | Category | Recipient | Result |
|---|---|---|---|---|
| 2011 | Fajr Film Festival | Best Actress | Vishka Asayesh | Won |
| 2011 | Fajr Film Festival | Best Original Score | Heydar Sajadi | Nominated |
| 2011 | Iran Cinema Celebration | Best Film | Ali Sartipi | Nominated |
| 2011 | Iran Cinema Celebration | Best Screenplay | Peyman Ghasemkhani | Nominated |
| 2011 | Iran Cinema Celebration | Best Actor | Reza Attaran | Won |
| 2011 | Iran Cinema Celebration | Best Actress | Vishka Asayesh | Nominated |
| 2011 | Iran Cinema Celebration | Best Sound Recording | Parviz Abnar | Nominated |
| 2011 | Iran Cinema Celebration | Best Sound Effects | Parviz Abnar | Nominated |
| 2011 | Iran's Film Critics and Writers Association | Best Actress | Vishka Asayesh | Nominated |
