= Delighted =

- Theatrical release poster
- Directed by: Abdolreza Kahani
- Written by: Abdolreza Kahani
- Produced by: Saeid Khani; Abdolreza Kahani
- Starring: Mahnaz Afshar; Tannaz Tabatabaei; Aida Mahiani; Mehran Ghafourian; Sahar Dolatshahi
- Cinematography: Moinreza Motallebi
- Edited by: Shima Monfared
- Release date: 2017
- Running time: 80 minutes
- Country: Iran
- Language: Persian

Delighted (Persian: ارادتمند؛ نازنین، بهاره، تینا, romanized: Eradatmand) is a 2016 drama film written and directed by Abdolreza Kahani. Starring Mahnaz Afshar, Tannaz Tabatabaei, Aida Mahiani, Mehran Ghafourian and Sahar Dolatshahi, Delighted is the story of three Iranian women "who want to have a good time" and to attain that end, are doing their best to find rich men for themselves.

== Cast ==
- Mahnaz Afshar as Tina
- Tannaz Tabatabaei as Bahareh
- Aida Mahiani as Nazanin
- Mehran Ghafourian as Behrouz
- Sahar Dolatshahi as Mahsa

== Issues ==
The film is the third of Kahani's to be refused permission to be screened in Iran, after Over There in 2008 and We've Got Time in 2014. In the hopes of recovering its production costs, Delighted was scheduled to be screened in Toronto in November 2017. Kahani cancelled the screening and refunded the ticket receipts after Iran's Ministry of Culture and Islamic Guidance threatened to ban the domestic release of his next film—the expensive Thai-Iranian production, We Like You Mrs. Yaya—if he refused to comply. "The Guidance Ministry sent a message and 'politely recommended' that the film should not be put on screen despite the fact that tickets had already been sold". Scheduled screenings in Canada, the UK, the Czech Republic, France, and Australia were cancelled, it has been shown on other occasions though, such as in Germany. It is also available on streaming platforms in the UK and US, like Amazon Prime or Hoopla.
