= Pig (2018 film) =

2018 film

- Film poster
- Directed by: Mani Haghighi
- Written by: Mani Haghighi
- Starring: Hassan Majooni
- Release dates: 21 February 2018 (Berlin); 2 May 2018 (Iran)
- Running time: 108 minutes
- Country: Iran
- Language: Persian

Pig (Persian: خوک, romanized: Khook) is a 2018 Iranian comedy film directed by Mani Haghighi. It was selected to compete for the Golden Bear in the main competition section at the 68th Berlin International Film Festival.

== Plot ==
An Iranian film director is blacklisted and is barred from directing films, forcing him to go into directing commercials. His actress leaves him to pursue a career with other actors. Whilst this is occurring, Iranian film directors are being killed off one by one, with their heads severed and the word 'pig' imprinted on their foreheads. The blacklisted film director wonders why the serial killer has not come after him.

== Cast ==
- Hassan Majooni
- Leila Hatami
- Leili Rashidi
- Parinaz Izadyar
- Ali Mosaffa
- Meena Jafarzadeh
- Ainaz Azarhoush
- Soheila Razavi
- Siamak Ansari
- Mahnaz Afshar as herself
- Payman Maadi as himself
- Vishka Asayesh as herself
- Saber Abar as himself
- Mahsa Hejazi
