= Transition (1989 film) =

1989 film directed by Kamal Tabrizi

- Film poster
- Directed by: Kamal Tabrizi
- Written by: Kamal Tabrizi
- Produced by: Ebrahim Hatamikia
- Starring: Aliakbar Orouei; Reza Ashtiani; Ali Jalili Bale
- Cinematography: Saeed Hajimiri
- Music by: Seyed Mohammad Mirzamani
- Release date: 1989
- Country: Iran
- Language: Persian

Oboor (Persian: عبور, Crossing or Transition in English) is a 1989 film by the Iranian director Kamal Tabrizi. Tabrizi also wrote the script. Set during the Iran-Iraq war, the film is an example of Sacred Defence cinema, a genre of Iranian films depicting the 1980–1988 war's impact on Iran.
