= Bahareh Rahnama =

Iranian actress (born 1973)

- بهاره رهنما گل تپه
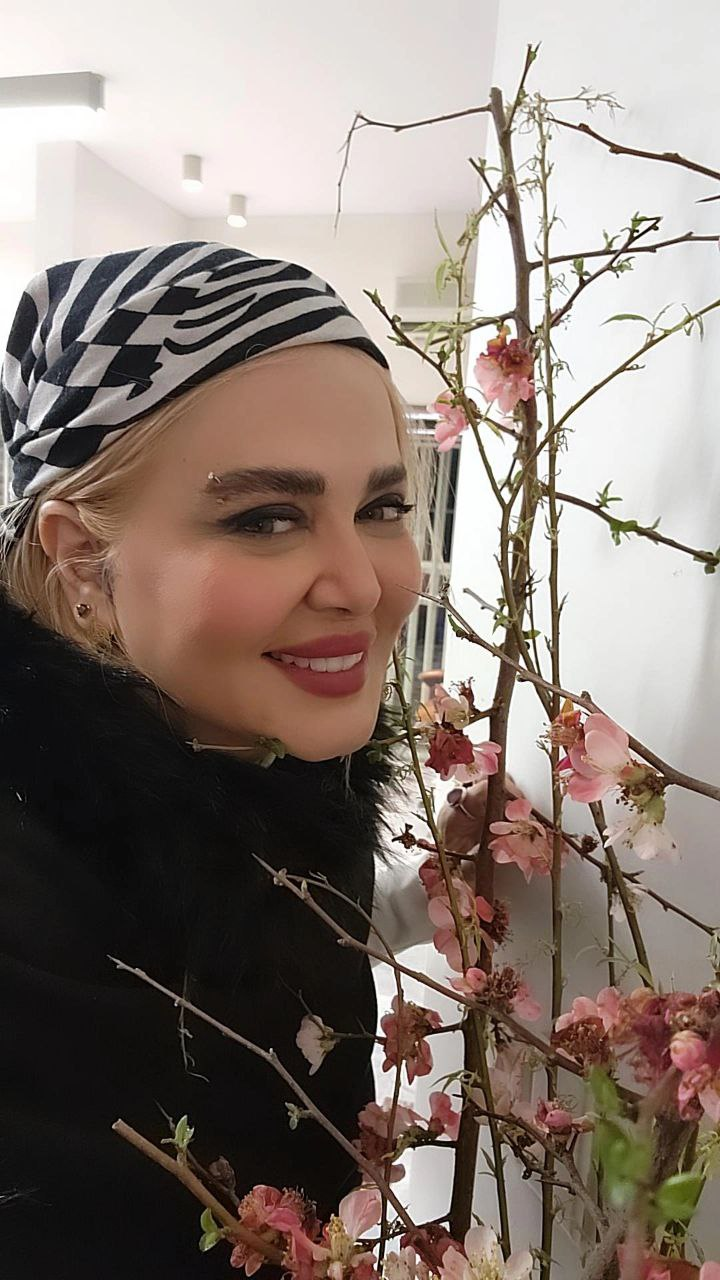
- Rahnama in 2022
- Born: December 1, 1973 (age 52); Arak, Iran
- Occupations: Actress; author
- Years active: 1973–present
- Spouses: Peyman Ghasemkhani (m. 1992; div. 2016) Amir Khosro Abbasi (m. 2017; div. 2022)
- Children: 1

Bahareh Rahnama (Persian: بهاره رهنما; born December 1, 1973) is an Iranian actress and author. She won a Hafez Award for her acting in Tambourine (2008).

== Early life ==
She was born to Persian parents on December 1, 1973, in Arak, Iran. Her father, Jalal Rahnama is a businessman and her mother, Parvin Ghaem Maghami is an actress. They moved to Tehran in early 1980.

== Career ==
=== Acting ===
Rahnama earned bachelor's degrees in Legal Rights and Persian Literature and a master's degree in Dramatic Literature. She also took screenwriting and acting courses, and worked as a journalist.

Her debut movie was Viper in 1991. Besides being a theater, television and film actress, Rahnama is also a writer. She has collaborated in writing for The Nights of Barareh (2005), Mozaffar’s Garden (2006) and Shams-ol-Emareh (2009) series. Rahnama also published a book entitled Seven Nights in a Month, which is a collection of her notes from her personal blog over 7 years.

The Iranian actress has played roles in various movies, such as Tambourine (2007), St. Petersburg (2009), No Men Allowed (2010), Men Are from Mars, Women Are from Venus (2010), Laughter in the Rain (2011) and Sensitive Level (2013). She has also appeared in series, including The Story of a City (2000), I'm a Tenant (2003), The Man of a Thousand Faces (2007) and Goodbye Child (2012).

=== Political career ===
She supported Mir-Hossein Mousavi in 2009 Presidential election. She meet with Zahra Rahnavard, Mousavi's spouse in May 2009 and was one of the members of Mir-Hossein Mousavi presidential campaign. She is one of the writers of Chelcheragh, a weekly social magazine printed in Iran.

== Personal life ==
She married Peyman Ghasemkhani in 1992. The couple divorced in 2016. Peyman is an Iranian screenwriter who mostly worked with Mehran Modiri. They have a daughter named Paria who was born in 1997. Paria has acted with her mother in two films, including Bano and Mard-e Hezar-Chehreh. Her mother, Parvin is also acted in TV series since 2004. Her former brother-in-law, Mehrab Ghasemkhani is also a writer and his former spouse, Shaghayegh Dehghan is an actress. Rahnama married Amir Khosro Abbasi in August 2017. In July 2022, Rahnama announced their separation on social media.

== Filmography ==
Actress
Title	Year	Role	Notes
Afee	1993	Azam	
Asheghaneh	1993	Elahe	
Ghazal	1994	Akram	
Bazghasht Be Khane	1995	Simin	TV series
Ey Nasim Baran	1996	Nasim	Theatre
Badamhaye Talkh	1997	Shahla	
Bachehaye Bad	1999	Merila	
Nan, Eshgh & Motor Hezar	2000	Baraan	
Pish Az Ashnaee	2000	Roz	Theatre
Dastan Yek Shahr 2	2000	Manijeh	TV series
Mola Sadra	2000	Elham	TV series
Gav Khoni	2002	Nina	
Man Yek Mostajeram	2003	Yeganeh	TV series
Panjareha	2005	Narges	Theatre
Zir Zamin	2006	Rozita	TV film
Tofigh Ejbari	2007	Shahla	
Dah Raghami	2007	Pone	
Dayere Zangi	2008	Shoeleh	
Mard-e Hezar-Chehreh	2008	Ghoghnos	TV series
Char Changoli	2008	Malosak	
Bazi	2008	Hedyeh	Short Film
Ma'mor Badragheh	2008	Kiyana	TV series
Khodaye Koshtar	2008	Sarah	Theatre
Hamlet Ba Salade Fasl	2009	Negin	Theatre
Gav Sandoogh	2009	Reyhaneh	TV series
Dastanhaye Interneti	2009	Zahra	
Popak & Mash Mashaalah	2010	Roya	
Ma 3 Nafar	2010	Parmida	
Saint Petersburg	2010	Nazanin	
Mikhaham Ba Mosio Molaghat Konam	2011	Popak	Theatre
No Men Allowed	2011	Mrs. Aghasi	
Pejman	2013	Parisa	TV series
Sensitive Floor	2014		
Excellency (Alijenab)	2025		TV Series
