= Kamal Tabrizi =

Iranian film director (born 1959)

- کمال تبریزی
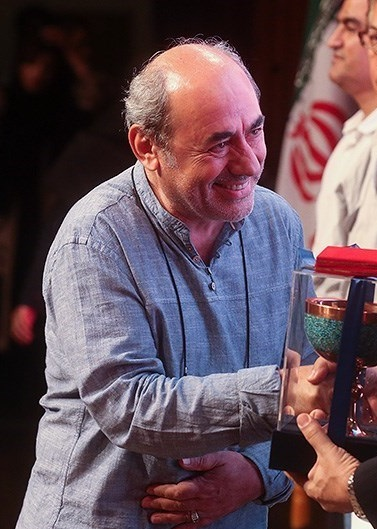
- Born: Kamal Mosafay Tabrizi; 28 October 1959 (age 66); Tehran, Iran
- Occupation: Film director
- Years active: 1980–present

Kamal Tabrizi (Persian: کمال تبریزی, born 28 October 1959) is an Iranian film director. He was born in Tehran, where his parents had moved from Tabriz. A newly released picture shows him as a photographer and reporter among the 1979 hostage takers at the U.S. Embassy in Tehran. Kamal Tabrizi graduated from Tehran University of Art 's Faculty of Cinema and Theater.

== Biography ==
After graduating from the university in Tehran, he went to the Iran-Iraq war (1981~1989) front as a director and photographer. He made his first documentary on war Martyrs, winning the Best Documentary award at Tashkent Film Festival. He taught Cinema and direction at the Young Cinema Society and Film Making Educational Center for some years and arranged many workshops on Cinema. He made his first feature film Passage, in 1988. Since then, he has made more than 18 feature films, including two co-productions with Japan ("Wind Carpet" (2001), which was the best seller in the Iranian Market). His feature films and TV series are the most popular in the Iranian Market and are well-received and awarded in International Film Festivals.

== Filmography as a director ==
Year	Title	English-language title	Famous actors featured
1988	Oboor	Passage	
1990	Dar Maslakh-e Eshgh	Shamble of Love	
1993	Payan-e Kudaki	End of Childhood	Jahangir Almasi; Fariba Kosari
1995	Leily Ba Man Ast	Leily Is with Me	Parviz Parastui; Shohreh Lorestani
1998	Mehr-e Madari	Maternal Love	Fatemeh Motamed Aria; Parviz Parastui
2000	Sheida	Sheida	Parsa Pirouzfar; Leila Hatami
2002	Farsh-e Baad	The Wind Carpet	Reza Kianian; Fariba Kamran
2001	Gahi Be Aseman Negah Kon	Look At The Sky, Sometimes	Reza Kianian; Atila Pesyani; Ahmad Aghalou; Hanieh Tavassoli
2003	Marmoulak	The Lizard	Parviz Parastui
2004	Yek Tekkeh Nan	A Piece of Bread	Reza Kianian; Human Seyyedi; Esmaeel Khalaj; Ahmad Aghalou; Roya Nonahali
2007	Hamishe paye yek zan dar myan ast	There Is Always a Woman	Golshifte Farahani; Habib Rezaei
2009	Padash	Reward	Hasan Majooni; Atila Pesyani; Bahman Zarrinpur; Saber Abar; Asha Mehrabi
2010	Davandeye zamin	The Earth Marathon	Sahar Dolatshahi; Kanpei Hazama
2011	Khyabanhaye aram	Calm Streets	Niki Karimi; Hasan Majooni; Mohammad Reza Foroutan
2014	Tabaghe-ye Hasas	Sensitive Floor	Reza Attaran; Pantea Bahram; Hootan Shakiba; Azadeh Samadi
2015	Emkan-e Mina	Mina's Option	Milad Keymaram; Mina Sadati
2018	Marmooz	Sly	Hamed Behdad; Vishka Asayesh; Mohammad Bahrani
2019	Ma hame ba ham hastim	We Are All Together	Leila Hatami; Mehran Modiri; Mohammad Reza Golzar; Vishka Asayesh; Pejman Jamshidi; Javad Ezzati; Mani Haghighi
2021	Dastan-e Dastandaz	A Bumpy Story	Reza Kianian; Hoda Zeinolabedin; Habib Rezaei; Roya Nonahali; Homayoun Ershadi; Omid Nemati

== See also ==
- Cinema of Iran
