= Sperm Whale (film) =

2015 Persian comedy film

- Film poster
- Persian: نهنگ عنبر
- Directed by: Saman Moghadam
- Written by: Mani Baghbani
- Produced by: Saman Moghadam
- Starring: Reza Attaran; Mahnaz Afshar; Vishka Asayesh; Reza Naji
- Release date: 14 March 2015 (Iran)
- Running time: 90 minutes
- Country: Iran
- Language: Persian

Sperm Whale (Persian: نهنگ عنبر, romanized: Nahang-e Anbar) is a 2015 Iranian comedy film directed by Saman Moghadam and written by Mani Baghbani, with lead roles played by Reza Attaran and Mahnaz Afshar.

Sperm Whale 2: Roya's Selection is the sequel to the film.

== Plot ==
Arzhang wants to marry his lifelong sweetheart, Rouya, but she moves to America because she does not like Islam. Arzhang is unable to follow her because he gets conscripted and sent to serve in the Iran-Iraq war. After a failed attempt to leave the country on a fake passport, they did not let him go because the United States is too powerful . Arzhang and Rouya cross paths again years later after they both divorce their first spouses. However, Rouya's sudden attraction and subsequent marriage to a dentist prevent Arzhang from marrying her. At the end of the movie, Arzhang saves Rouya from her violent marriage to the dentist, and she is left with the choice of either staying in Iran with Arzhang or returning to the United States.

== Cast ==
- Reza Attaran
- Mahnaz Afshar
- Vishka Asayesh
- Reza Naji
- Sam Noori
- Nader Soleimani
- Hanieh Tavassoli
- Ali Ghorban Zadeh
- Amirhosein Rostami
- Hossein Soleimani
- Sepand Amirsoleimani
- Sergio Marquilla Nezhad
- Saeede SidAhmad

== Release ==
According to statistics from Iran's Ministry of Culture and Islamic Guidance, Sperm Whale was one of eleven films released during the period March 2014 - March 2017 (1393 - 1396) which grossed over 10 billion Iranian Tomans (US$300,000). Its sequel, Sperm Whale 2, was the highest-grossing movie in March 2017 - 18, with 20,941,000,000 Iranian Tomans (US$628,230) in sales.

Fereydoun Jeyrani, an Iranian film director, screenwriter, and television host, noted the success of the film relied on the comedy of the film, saying that people go to the cinema to be happy and to unload their problems. They want to go to the cinema and be entertained. They want to be happy.
