= Reza Attaran =

Iranian actor, director, screenwriter and singer (born 1968)

- رضا عطاران
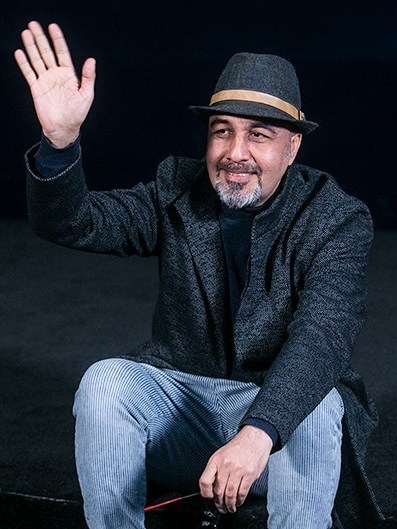
- Attaran in 2018
- Born: 10 May 1968 (age 58); Mashhad, Iran
- Education: University of Tehran
- Occupations: Actor; director; screenwriter; singer
- Years active: 1990–present
- Spouse: Farideh Faramarzi (m. 1994)
- Website: Official website

Reza Attaran (Persian: رضا عطاران; born 10 May 1968) is an Iranian actor, director, and screenwriter. Originally from Kakhak, he earned a diploma in economics and pursued further studies in industrial design at the Faculty of Fine Arts, University of Tehran, but left to focus on a career in cinema. He has also lived in Sabzevar. Attaran began acting in theater during the 1980s, made his television debut in Bidaaran (1990), and gained prominence through collaborations with Mehran Modiri in Parvaz 57 (1993) and Saat-e Khosh (1994–1995).

Attaran’s first directorial work was the children’s television program Sib-e Khandeh (1997). That same year, he debuted in cinema with Key of Marriage. He appeared in Kolah Ghermez va Sarvenaz (2002) and gained widespread recognition for directing and starring in the popular television series Khaneh Be Doosh (2004) and Moteham Gorikht (2005). His role in the film Khorus Jangi (2007) was followed by awards in 2010, including the Golden Smile Statuette and an Honorary Diploma for Best Actor at the second Sun Smile Ceremony for his performances in Vorood-e Aghayan Mamnoo and Asb Hayvan-e Najibi Ast.

In 2011, Attaran’s direction and acting in Khabam Miad earned him the Crystal Simorgh for Best Director, and his role in Bikhod va Bi Jahat secured an Honorary Diploma for Best Actor from the Cinema Critics Association. For his performance in Tabaqe Hassas (2013), he won the Crystal Simorgh for Best Actor. In 2014, Attaran was named Iran’s most profitable actor, with box office earnings of 1.6 billion tomans from films such as Tabaqe Hassas, Red Carpet, and Kalashnikov. He later starred in commercially successful films, including Nahang-e Anbar (2015), Nahang-e Anbar 2: Selection-e Roya (2017), Hezarpa (2018), and Enferadi (2019). In 2020, he won another Crystal Simorgh for Best Actor for his role in Roshan.

== Early life and education ==
Reza Attaran was born on 10 May 1968 in Mashhad. He has two older sisters and a younger brother, being the third child in his family. Originally from Kakhk, his mother died in an earthquake in the region. His father, Zabihollah Attaran, died in Mashhad on 15 January 2025. As a child, Attaran was a diligent student.

=== Education ===
Attaran earned his diploma in economics in Mashhad and later enrolled in the industrial design program at the Faculty of Fine Arts, University of Tehran. He discontinued his studies to pursue a career in acting and cinema. In an interview, he noted that his choice of industrial design was influenced by family discussions and his desire to study at the Faculty of Fine Arts.

== Career ==
=== 1980s and 1990s: Early Career ===
Attaran’s career began with theater performances under Hassan Hamed in the 1980s. He started at the Children and Young Adults Intellectual Development Center. He joined the children’s section of Mashhad’s IRIB in 1982, appearing in the program Rainbow. His collaboration with Hamed continued until 1991. He credits Hamed as his most significant influence.

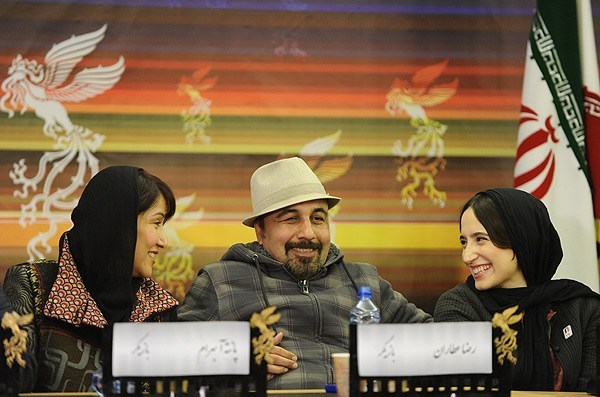
Attaran alongside Pantea Bahram and Negar Javaherian at the press conference for the film "Bikhod o Bi Jahat"

=== Television ===
Attaran’s television debut was in Bidaaran (1990), directed by Asghar Abdollahi. His breakthrough came with Parvaz 57 (1993), followed by Saat-e Khosh (1994), both directed by Mehran Modiri, where he served as an actor and writer. Saat-e Khosh was notable for its unconventional narrative and moral undertones, significantly advancing his acting career. In 1995, he continued working with Modiri in Sal-e Khosh.

In 1997, Attaran acted in Donya-ye Shirin, a children’s series directed by Behrooz Baghaei, aired on IRIB Channel 1. He later appeared alongside Khosrow Shakibai and Rambod Javan in Sarzamin-e Sabz, broadcast on IRIB Channel 2.

His directorial debut came with Sib-e Khandeh (1997), a weekly children’s program on IRIB Channel 1. In 1998, he acted, wrote, and directed Majid Delbandam alongside Majid Salehi and Yousuf Teymouri. In 1999, Attaran starred in, served as art director for, and wrote Qatar-e Abadi, a comedic series that parodied stories like Hassan Kachal, Scheherazade, and Robin Hood, incorporating social commentary. The series was among the most successful television programs of the late 1990s. He also served as a consultant director and writer for In Chand Nafar.

"I wrote the screenplay for No Men Allowed with Reza Attaran in mind, and interestingly, he performed the role beyond the script. Reza Attaran can easily say no to many things, like a few collaborations with me! And that's exactly why he has staying power."

— Reza Attaran,

=== Cinema ===
Reza Attaran’s first cinematic role was in Key of Marriage (1997), directed by Davood Movassaghi, where he acted alongside Alireza Khamseh and Nader Soleimani. Written by Afshin Sarfaraz, the film follows a man tasked with delivering smuggled goods to a gang in Tehran.

=== 2000s: Directing and Television ===
==== Television ====
In 2000, Attaran served as a consultant director and writer for Zire Aseman-e Shahr. Mehran Ghafourian, the director and producer, credited Attaran with creating all the characters, stating, “After the success of my previous projects, IRIB signed a contract with me to produce a show. I approached Reza Attaran, saying I wanted a project that would make waves. He agreed, and we spent months writing the script. Reza worked tirelessly, and he is the creator of Zire Aseman-e Shahr.”

In 2002, Attaran acted, directed, and wrote for the comedy series Koucheh Aghaghia. The following year, he took on the same roles for Khaneh Be Doosh, a series with a simple storyline that addressed social issues like poverty, greed, and ignorance. While praised for its comedic and satirical elements, some critics noted its simplistic narrative. The success of Khaneh Be Doosh inspired Attaran to use a similar style for Moteham Gorikht (2005), co-directed with Saeed Aghakhani. After this, he made a guest appearance in Ketabforoushi-e Hodhod (2006). In 2006, he directed, acted, and sang in Torsh o Shirin.

In 2008, Attaran was a consultant director for Se Dar Chahar, directed by Majid Salehi. That same year, he directed and starred in Bezangah, a Ramadan special for IRIB Channel 3. Despite his television success with series like Khaneh Be Doosh, Moteham Gorikht, Torsh o Shirin, and Bezangah earning him widespread popularity, Attaran parted ways with IRIB after facing restrictions. On 18 September 2008, the IRIB Oversight Council sent a letter to the organization’s management, citing public criticism and norm-breaking content, leading to the series’ suspension. However, IRIB Channel 3’s public relations later clarified that the broadcast would continue. Although Attaran still receives offers from IRIB, he has cited exhaustion as his reason for avoiding television work, and no official collaboration has been reported since.

==== Cinema ====
In 2000, Attaran starred in his second film, Cinderella, alongside Poopak Goldarreh and Rambod Javan. In 2002, he appeared in Kolah Ghermez va Sarvenaz. He later acted in Hoo and Kolah-i Baraye Baran (2006). Reviews of Kolah-i Baraye Baran praised Attaran’s effortless performance and well-written dialogue, noting his ability to remain believable despite weak character development.

2007 was a prolific year for Attaran, with roles in five films: Tighzan, Quarantine, Khorus Jangi, Towfigh-e Ejbari, and Tasvieh Hesab. His performance in Khorus Jangi stood out, with critics attributing the film’s box office success to his presence despite a flawed script. In 2009, he starred in Nish-e Zanbour, which grossed 1.75 billion tomans after 72 days across 25 theaters. Producer Ali Sertipi noted the film aimed to differentiate itself from other recent comedies by avoiding superficiality, a goal he believed was largely achieved.

In 2010, Attaran played a fraudulent sergeant in Asb Hayvan-e Najibi Ast, showcasing a more subdued performance compared to his usual energetic roles. That same year, he starred in Vorood-e Aghayan Mamnoo, which solidified his reputation as an actor in 2011. Critics had mixed reviews, with Masoud Ferasti offering positive feedback. For his roles in Asb Hayvan-e Najibi Ast and Vorood-e Aghayan Mamnoo, Attaran won the Golden Smile Statuette and an Honorary Diploma for Best Actor at the second Sun Smile Ceremony.

=== 2010s: Departure from Television, Cinematic Success, and Box Office Dominance ===
After the series Bezangah, Reza Attaran left television. Following this departure, he only occasionally assisted as a consultant for Majid Salehi and Saeed Aghakhani. Attaran also appeared as a guest on the television program Gap, directed by Rambod Javan, which was broadcast on the iFilm network. In this program, he discussed his life, acting career, work approach, and marriage.

In 2011, Attaran directed and starred in the film Khabam Miad. The cast included Akbar Abdi, Merila Zarei, and Vishka Asayesh. The film premiered at the 30th Fajr Film Festival, where Attaran won the Crystal Simorgh for Best Director in the New Vision section. Film critic Manouchehr Akbarloo highlighted the film’s ability to connect with audiences as one of its strengths. In the same year, Attaran acted in Bikhod o Bi Jahat, directed by Abdolreza Kahani. The film was released in cinemas on December 8, 2012, and Attaran received the Diploma of Honor for Best Actor from the Film Critics Association. The film received mixed reviews; some critics, like Masoud Farasti, criticized it for lacking serious mise-en-scène, while others, such as Mehrzad Danesh, praised its strong character development.

Following Bikhod o Bi Jahat, Attaran starred in Che Khoobe Ke Bargashti, directed by Dariush Mehrjooi, alongside Hamed Behdad and Mahnaz Afshar. The film was compared to Mehman-e Maman in terms of its format and set design. Attaran then collaborated with Behrooz Shoeibi in Dehliz, alongside Hanieh Tavassoli. The film premiered at the Fajr Film Festival. Attaran was nominated for the Crystal Simorgh for Best Actor for his performance in this film and won the Best Actor award at the 7th Critics Association Awards. While accepting the award, Attaran humorously remarked to the audience, “I’m happy even if I didn’t deserve this award. Receiving an award from critics in this period means a lot to me, especially since the state of cinema in the previous period was like a scorpion in a sack!”

In contrast to his usual comedic roles, Attaran delivered a serious performance in Dehliz, which was well-received by some critics. Masoud Farasti praised the film, stating, “Dehliz is a good, Iranian, and local film. The characters are identifiable, relatable, and represent people with real issues. The cinematography is balanced and doesn’t detract from the film.” However, critic Nima Hassani-Nasab described the film as low-quality, stating, “I’m among the few who aren’t kind to Dehliz. My stance is a reaction to the trend of minority-focused filmmaking that lowers the quality of good films. We’ve led our talented filmmakers astray with such excuses. Iranian cinema and Behrooz Shoeibi deserve better than Dehliz, and I hope we raise our expectations.”

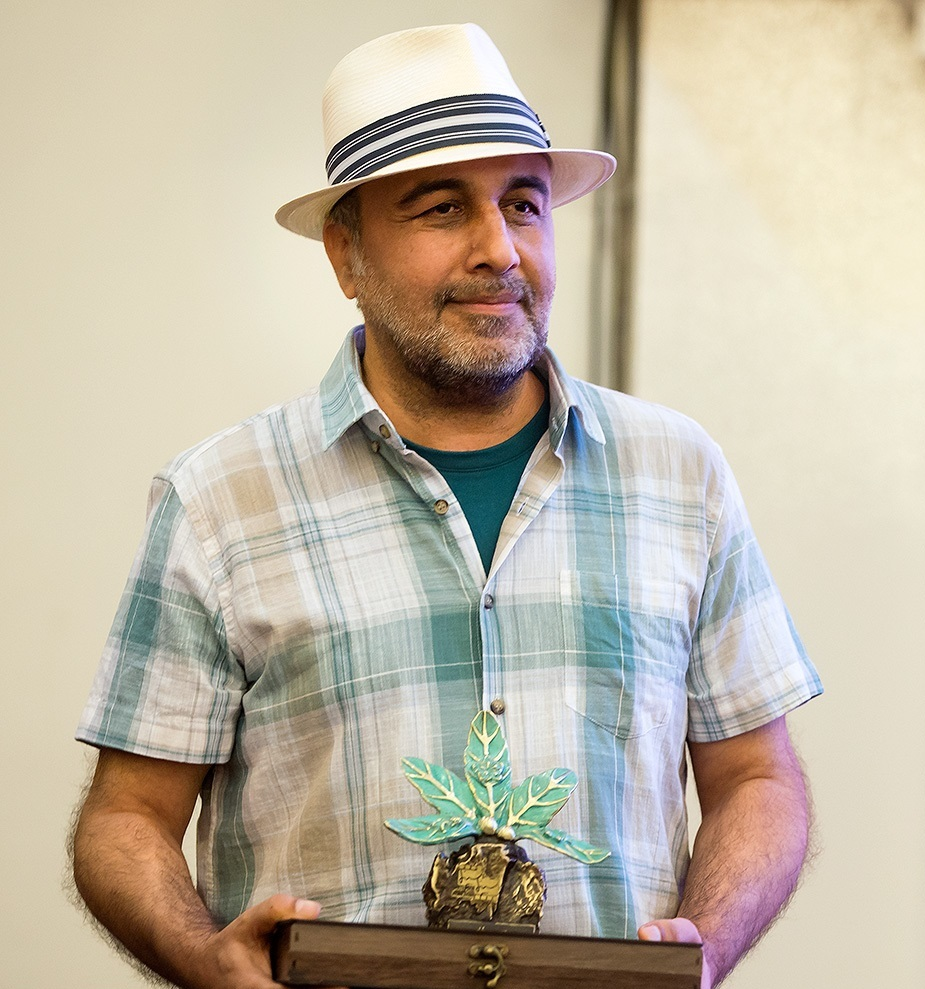
Attaran at the first edition of the CinemaCinema Academy Award

In 2013, Attaran acted in Tabaqe Hassas, which was released on March 6, 2014, and grossed 1.45 billion tomans in Tehran by April 1, 2014, without any television promotion. Despite criticism that the film had “a simple but engaging story that could have offered more comedy but ultimately delivers little,” Attaran’s performance was well-regarded, and he was described as a charismatic actor loved by audiences. He won the Crystal Simorgh for Best Actor at the 32nd Fajr Film Festival for this role. However, Faramarz Gharibian, a jury member, revealed that the award was initially unanimously awarded to Navid Mohammadzadeh for Asabani Nistam!, but external pressures led to it being given to Attaran. Four days after the festival’s closing ceremony, Attaran stated in an interview that the Crystal Simorgh rightfully belonged to Navid Mohammadzadeh. During the Tabaqe Hassas press conference at the Fajr Film Festival, when asked if he would do anything to make audiences laugh and whether his acting involved breaking taboos, Attaran responded, “I’m very much among the people; I ride in their cars and see them. They all ask me to make something that makes them laugh. I believe society today needs laughter. A critic friend once said that Attaran would even pull down his pants to make people laugh. I’m ready to pull down my pants to make people laugh. I’ve held back my emotions a bit, but this is truly what society needs.” This statement sparked significant reactions. Jamshid Mashayekhi criticized Attaran’s comment, saying, “If Mr. Reza Attaran wants to make people laugh, it’s better to jump off a plane tree than to say such inappropriate things, which I’m ashamed to repeat.” In a later interview with Ehsan Alikhani on a Nowruz special program on Channel 3, Attaran addressed the controversy, calling it a misunderstanding.

In 2013, Attaran also starred in Esterahat-e Motlagh, directed by Abdolreza Kahani, which was released in 2014. The film sparked controversy due to physical interactions between Attaran and his wife. Although the film faced demands for edits, Kahani resisted, noting that Attaran was acting alongside his real-life spouse. The story follows a woman, played by Taraneh Alidoosti, who migrates from Damghan to Tehran to return to her previous workplace and encounters her abusive ex-husband during the journey. Like many of Kahani’s films, such as Asb Hayvan-e Najibi Ast, Esterahat-e Motlagh employs a dark atmosphere. The film received positive reviews for Attaran’s performance, with both he and Taraneh Alidoosti being praised as the film’s strongest actors, alongside Babak Hamidian, who was noted for his believable performance.

Attaran’s cinematic career continued with roles in Red Carpet and Kalashnikov. He also directed and wrote Red Carpet. Critics noted that the film “lacks substance in its appearance and decoupage but contains many moral messages, though they are disjointed and fail to fully manifest in the main character.” Other critics remarked, “Attaran’s main point is that an Iranian, even if traveling to Mars, can still be recognized as Iranian from afar. Unfortunately, this idea doesn’t fully come to fruition, preventing the film from becoming a lasting work in Iranian cinema.”

Due to his artistic success in Tabaqe Hassas, Red Carpet, and Kalashnikov, Attaran was named the most profitable actor in Iranian cinema in 2014, with earnings of 1.6 billion tomans.

In 2014, Attaran starred in Nahang-e Anbar, directed by Saman Moghadam, playing a 50-year-old man, Arzhang Sanobar, narrating his past life. Initially scheduled to screen at the 33rd Fajr Film Festival, the film was reviewed and re-edited before its theatrical release in late May 2015. Despite criticism of the screenplay’s weaknesses, Attaran was credited with compensating for these flaws to some extent. Following Nahang-e Anbar, Attaran acted in Ginness and Man Salvador Nistam. Ginness was considered a departure from Attaran’s usual success, with critics noting that his lackluster performance stemmed from weak character development. After mixed reviews for Ginness and success in Man Salvador Nistam, Attaran wrote, directed, and starred in Dracula, which received negative reviews. His next project, Abnabat Choobi, was criticized for its lack of narrative logic and overly long introduction, and was generally deemed a weak film by critics.

In 2016, Attaran starred in Nahang-e Anbar 2: Selection-e Roya, which was released on May 10, 2017. The film grossed over 20 billion tomans, making it the highest-grossing film in Iranian cinema history at the time and currently ranking sixth. However, critics found it weaker than the first installment, noting, “The only positive aspect of the film might be Reza Attaran himself, who has, in recent years, established his own unique comedic genre in Iranian cinema. In this genre, the burden of weak and uninspired screenplays falls entirely on his shoulders, and he manages to carry them with his innate charisma.” Attaran’s next film, Khanoum-e Yaya, received negative reviews from both audiences and critics. He then starred in Mosadereh, directed by Mehran Ahmadi, which follows a naive SAVAK purchasing agent who flees Iran during the revolution after marrying a foreign woman. The film was criticized for starting strong but declining in quality, though some critics, such as Mohammadreza Lotfi, praised it as “a prime example of a proper and good industrial film, which is lacking in our cinema. It should serve as a model for filmmakers and industry leaders, showing what a standard film without cheapness or vulgarity looks like, one that sells well and maintains quality.” Attaran’s next role was in Hezarpa, which grossed over 30 billion tomans, becoming the highest-grossing film in Iranian cinema history and the first to reach this milestone. Despite its commercial success, the film was criticized as weak, with some reviews pointing out that its female characters were portrayed as unintelligent, and much of its humor relied on this premise. Attaran’s successful cinematic run included starring in Hezarpa, Nahang-e Anbar 2: Selection-e Roya, Mosadereh, and Man Salvador Nistam, all of which grossed over 10 billion tomans.

In 2018, Attaran starred in and served as a consultant director for Zir-e Nazar, directed by Majid Salehi. The film received mixed reviews, with some critics describing its characters as “all sexually deviant, with no normal person present throughout the film,” while others noted that “the sexual humor in Zir-e Nazar, unlike films like Rahman 1400, is not crude and aligns well with the film’s essence.”

Attaran also appeared in Azad Mesl-e Hava (directed by Abdolreza Kahani), Enferadi (directed by Seyed Masoud Atyabi), and Roshan (directed by Rouhollah Hejazi). For his role in Roshan, he won the Best Actor award at the 39th Fajr Film Festival.

=== 2020s ===
==== Home Entertainment Network ====
In 2023, Reza Attaran starred in the home entertainment series Daftar-e Yaddasht. According to Milad Jalilzadeh in Farhykhtegan, the series had "almost no winning elements" aside from Attaran himself.

After a year-long hiatus from the home entertainment network, Attaran starred in the series Ajal-e Moallagh in 2024.

==== Cinema ====
In 2023, Attaran acted in Villa-ye Saheli and Ghif. These films had a more successful box office opening compared to other films released during that period. Additionally, in 2024, he starred in the film Saddam.

== Personal life ==
Reza Attaran’s father, Zabihollah Attaran, spoke about his son’s passion for acting, stating, “To be honest, at first, I was opposed to it. I didn’t understand this field and thought it wasn’t a good profession, and my judgment was limited. But when I saw Reza’s enthusiasm for art and acting, I said, ‘Alright, my dear, pursue your work.’”

In 1995, Attaran married Farideh Faramarzi, a film actress. In an interview regarding his decision not to have children, he said, “If you weigh the pros and cons of having children, I believe not having them is better. From the beginning, my wife and I were in agreement, and before marriage, we seriously decided against having children.” Attaran is also involved in charitable activities and visits charitable organizations. Additionally, he owns a photography studio located on a street in northern Tehran.

== Public Appearance ==
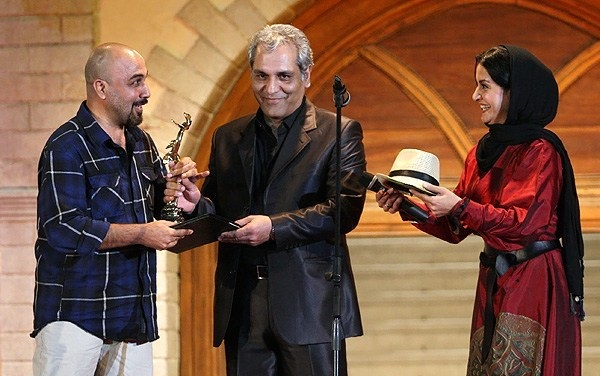
Reza Attaran, alongside Mehran Modiri and Merila Zarei, at the 15th Iran Cinema Celebration

Reza Attaran has received varied critiques from different individuals. Ali Sartipi commented on his personality, stating, “Attaran is selective. Sometimes he works for personal satisfaction; for instance, he acted in Khanoum-e Yaya, which I don’t find an appealing film. Perhaps he did it because he likes Kahani or for some other reason. I was the producer of Dracula, and that film, too, was a project Attaran did for personal reasons.” Vishka Asayesh remarked, “Without doing anything special, people are drawn to watching him.” Film critic Reza Dorostkar describes Attaran as a charismatic actor who shines in films like Hezarpa but falters in projects like Dracula. Manouchehr Hadi considers him a unique comedic actor whose inherent decency ensures his humor avoids vulgarity. Mohammad Hossein Farahbakhsh stated, “Attaran is a unique figure. He’s an actor who can elevate a mildly humorous situation to a much higher level.”

Masoud Farasti commented on Attaran’s acting trajectory, saying, “In his television films, Attaran was once a true comedian. Over time, he began repeating himself, which caused him to regress. Superficial comedy doesn’t surprise, isn’t sharp, lacks situational or character impact, and is merely a simplistic comic relief summarized in tone alone.”

In 2018, Attaran was named the most profitable actor in Iranian cinema. His three films, Hezarpa, Mosadereh, and Khanoum-e Yaya, collectively grossed 56.751 billion tomans. Regarding this title, Attaran remarked, “I dislike the term ‘most profitable actor.’ It feels like you’re talking about a machine generating money for itself or others, while in reality, our cinema isn’t at that level. Each year, only a few films might break even.”

Attaran’s television series enjoy significant popularity among audiences. In Ramadan 2020, Motaham Gorikht remained the most-watched series of the month, even years after its initial broadcast.

== Filmography ==
=== Film ===
Year	Title	Role	Actor	Screenwriter	Director	Notes
1997	The Key to Marriage	Abdol	Yes	No	Davoud Mavasaghi	
2001	Cinderella	Sculptor	Yes	No	Bijan Birang, Masoud Rassam	
2002	Kolah Ghermezi and Sarvenaz	Changiz	Yes	No	Iraj Tahmasb	
2006	Havoo	Ata	Yes	No	Alireza Davood Nejad	
2007	A Hat for Baran	Ebi	Yes	No	Masoud Navabi	
2007	Mandatory Success	Ata	Yes	No	Mohammad Hossein Latifi	
2007	Fighter Rooster	Mahmoud Delroba	Yes	No	Masoud Atyabi	
2008	Tigh-zan	Ata	Yes	No	Alireza Davood Nejad	
2008	Quarantine	Gholamreza	Yes	No	Manouchehr Hadi	
2008	Empty Chair	Esmail	Yes	No	Saman Estereki	
2008	Address	Reza	Yes	No	Fereidoun Hassanpour	
2008	Mr. Seven Colors	Houshang Saman	Yes	No	Sharam Shah Hosseini	
2009	7:05	Annet's driver	Yes	No	Mohammad Mehdi Asgarpour	
2009	Bee Sting	Reza	Yes	No	Hamid Reza Salahmand	
2010	Pay Back	Ali	Yes	No	Tahmineh Milani	
2010	Accusation	Ehsan	Yes	No	Mehrdad Farid	
2010	A Very Dog Day Afternoon	Salar	Yes	No	Mostafa Kiayee	
2010	Whatever God Wants	Daei	Yes	No	Navid Mihandoust	
2011	No Men Allowed	Vahid Jebelli	Yes	No	Rambod Javan	
2011	Mind Your Manners	Angel of Death	Yes	No	Masoud Atyabi	
2011	Absolutely Tame Is a Horse	Behrouz Shakiba / Kamal Khosrowjordi	Yes	No	Abdolreza Kahani	
2011	3 Degrees of Fever	Abdolkarim	Yes	No	Hamid Reza Salahmand	
2012	Needlessly and Causelessly	Mohsen	Yes	No	Abdolreza Kahani	
2012	I Feel Sleepy	Reza	Yes	Yes	Reza Attaran	also as editor
2013	The Corridor	Behzad	Yes	No	Behrouz Shoeibi	
2013	Good to Be Back	Kambiz	Yes	No	Dariush Mehrjui	
2014	Sensitive Floor	Mr. Kamali	Yes	No	Kamal Tabrizi	
2014	Kalashnikov	Reza	Yes	No	Saeed Sohili	
2014	Red Carpet	Reza Attaran	Yes	Yes	Reza Attaran	
2015	Sperm Whale	Arjang Senobar	Yes	No	Saman Moghaddam	
2015	Absolute Rest	Davoud	Yes	No	Abdolreza Kahani	
2015	Guinness	Bahman	Yes	No	Mohsen Tanabandeh	
2016	Lollipop	Farhad	Yes	No	Hossein Farah Bakhsh	
2016	I Am Not Salvador	Naser Izadi / Salvador	Yes	No	Manouchehr Hadi	
2016	Dracula	Javad	Yes	Yes	Reza Attaran	
2017	Sperm Whale: Roya's Selection	Arjang Senobar	Yes	No	Saman Moghaddam	
2018	Confiscation	Esmail Yarjanlo	Yes	No	Mehran Ahmadi	
2018	Centipede	Reza Hezarpa	Yes	No	Abolhassan Davoudi	
2018	Miss Yaya	Naser	Yes	No	Abdolreza Kahani	
2019	Under the Supervision	Mosen	Yes	No	Majid Salehi	
2021	Bright House	Roshan	Yes	No	Rouhollah Hejazi	
2021	Shishlik	Hashem	Yes	No	Mohammad Hossein Mahdavian	
2022	Solitary	Javad	Yes	No	Masoud Atyabi	
2023	Beach Villa	Farrokh	Yes	No	Kianoush Ayari	
2024	Funnel		Yes	Yes	Mohsen Amiryoussefi	
2025	Saddam		Yes	No	Pedram Pouramiri	
TBA	Limousine		Yes	No	Ebrahim Amerian	
TBA	Free Like Air	Rasoul	Yes	Yes	Abdolreza Kahani	Completed

=== Television ===
Year	Title	Role	Actor	Screenwriter	Director	Network	Notes
1990	Awake		Yes	No	Asghar Abdollahi	IRIB TV2	TV series
1994	Flight No.57		Yes	No	Mehran Modiri	IRIB TV1	TV mini-series
1994–1995	Happy Hour		Yes	Yes	Mehran Modiri	IRIB TV2	TV series
1995	Happy Year		Yes	Yes	Mehran Modiri	IRIB TV2	TV series
1997	Sweet World		Yes	No	Behrouz Baghai	IRIB TV1	TV series
1997	Green Land		Yes	No	Bijan Birang	IRIB TV2	TV series
1997	Laughing Apple		No	Yes	Reza Attaran, Shirin Jahed	IRIB TV1	TV series
1998	My Dear Majid	Teymour	Yes	Yes	Reza Attaran	IRIB TV1	TV series
1999	Word in Word		No	Yes	Mehran Ghafourian	IRIB TV5	TV series
1999–2000	Eternal Train	Psychotic patient	Yes	Yes	Reza Attaran, Behrouz Baghai	IRIB TV3	TV series
1999–2000	These few People		No	Yes	Mehran Ghafourian	IRIB TV3	TV series
2001–2002	Under the City's Sky	TV presenter	Yes	Yes	Mehran Ghafourian	IRIB TV3	TV series
2002	Sea People	Behnam	Yes	No	Sirous Moghaddam	IRIB TV5	TV series
2003–2004	Acacia Alley	Faramarz Tehrani	Yes	Yes	Reza Attaran	IRIB TV5	TV series
2004	Homeless	Ahmad	Yes	Yes	Reza Attaran	IRIB TV3	TV series
2005	The Accused Escaped	Ramin	Yes	No	Reza Attaran	IRIB TV3	TV series
2006	Hodhod Bookstore	(Cameo)	Yes	No	Marzieh Boroomand	IRIB TV3	TV series
2006	Sweet and Sour	Naser Morovat	Yes	No	Reza Attaran	IRIB TV3	TV series
2008	Three by Four	(Cameo)	Yes	No	Majid Salehi, co-director Reza Attaran	IRIB TV1	TV series
2008	Right on Time	Nader Parvar	Yes	No	Reza Attaran	IRIB TV3	TV series
2010	Stepmother		No	No	Saeed Aghakhani, co-director Reza Attaran	IRIB TV3	TV series
2011	Waves and Rocks		No	No	Majid Salehi, co-director Reza Attaran	IRIB TV5	TV series
2012	Right on Point		No	No	Saeed Aghakhani, co-director Reza Attaran	IRIB TV3	TV series
2012	Gap	Himself	No	No	Rambod Javan	iFilm	TV program

=== Web ===
Year	Title	Role	Actor	Screenwriter	Director	Platform
2012–2014	Frozen Heart	Esfandiyar	Yes	No	Saman Moghaddam	Video CD
2023–2024	The Notebook	Iraj Majd	Yes	No	Kiarash Asadizadeh	Filmnet
2025	Ajale Moalagh		Yes	No	Adel Tabrizi	Filmnet

== Awards and nominations ==
Name of the award ceremony, year presented, category, nominee of the award, and the result of the nomination
Award	Year	Category	Nominated Work	Result	Ref(s)
Fajr Film Festival	2012	Best First Director	I Feel Sleepy	Won	
Fajr Film Festival	2012	Best Actor in a Leading Role	I Feel Sleepy	Nominated	
Fajr Film Festival	2013	Best Actor in a Leading Role	The Corridor	Nominated	
Fajr Film Festival	2014	Best Actor in a Leading Role	Sensitive Floor	Won	
Fajr Film Festival	2018	Best Actor in a Leading Role	Confiscation	Nominated	
Fajr Film Festival	2021	Best Actor in a Leading Role	Bright House	Won	
Fajr Film Festival	2025	Best Actor in a Leading Role	Saddam	Nominated	
Hafez Awards	2006	Best Director – Television Series	The Accused Escaped	Won	
Hafez Awards	2006	Best Original Song – Television Series	The Accused Escaped	Nominated	
Hafez Awards	2010	Best Director – Television Series	Sweet and Sour	Nominated	
Hafez Awards	2010	Best Actor – Television Series Comedy	Sweet and Sour	Nominated	
Hafez Awards	2014	Best Actor – Motion Picture	The Corridor and Sensitive Floor	Won	
Hafez Awards	2015	Jury Prize	Red Carpet	Won	
Hafez Awards	2015	Best Actor – Motion Picture	Red Carpet	Nominated	
Hafez Awards	2015	Best Director – Motion Picture	Red Carpet	Nominated	
Hafez Awards	2016	Best Actor – Motion Picture	Sperm Whale	Nominated	
Hafez Awards	2017	Best Screenplay – Motion Picture	Dracula	Won	
Hafez Awards	2018	Best Actor – Motion Picture	Sperm Whale: Roya's Selection	Nominated	
Hafez Awards	2019	Best Actor – Motion Picture	Centipede	Nominated	
Hafez Awards	2019	Best Special Individual Achievement	Himself	Won	
Hafez Awards	2024	Best Actor – Television Series Comedy	The Notebook	Nominated	
Hafez Awards	2024	Best Actor – Motion Picture	Bright House	Won	
Iran Cinema Celebration	2011	Best Actor in a Leading Role	Absolutely Tame Is a Horse and No Men Allowed	Won	
Iran Cinema Celebration	2014	Best Actor in a Leading Role	Sensitive Floor	Nominated	
Iran Cinema Celebration	2014	Best New Director	I Feel Sleepy	Nominated	
Iran's Film Critics and Writers Association	2011	Best Actor in a Leading Role	Absolutely Tame Is a Horse	Honorary Diploma	
Iran's Film Critics and Writers Association	2012	Best Actor in a Leading Role	Needlessly and Causelessly	Honorary Diploma	
Iran's Film Critics and Writers Association	2013	Best Actor in a Leading Role	The Corridor	Won	
Iran's Film Critics and Writers Association	2014	Best Actor in a Leading Role	Red Carpet	Nominated	
Iran's Film Critics and Writers Association	2014	Best Actor in a Leading Role	Sensitive Floor	Nominated	
Iran's Film Critics and Writers Association	2015	Best Actor in a Leading Role	Sperm Whale	Nominated	
Iran's Film Critics and Writers Association	2018	Best Actor in a Leading Role	Confiscation	Nominated	
