= Needlessly and Causelessly =

- Film poster
- Directed by: Abdolreza Kahani
- Written by: Abdolreza Kahani
- Produced by: Abdolreza Kahani
- Starring: Reza Attaran; Pantea Bahram; Negar Javaherian; Ahmad Mehranfar
- Cinematography: Ali Loghmani
- Edited by: Shima Monfared
- Music by: Karen Homayunfar
- Distributed by: Nasim Saba
- Release dates: February 1, 2012 (FIFF); November 28, 2012 (Iran)
- Running time: 74 minutes
- Country: Iran
- Language: Persian
- Box office: 1.16 billion toman

Needlessly and Causelessly (Persian: بی‌خود و بی‌جهت, romanized: Bikhodo Bi Jehat) is a 2012 Iranian drama film directed, written and produced by Abdolreza Kahani. The film screened for the first time at the 30th Fajr Film Festival.

The film was generally praised for its acting and ensemble cast, with Attaran, Bahram, Javaherian and Mehranfar being singled out for praise.

== Premise ==
two couples are stuck in a house together. one of the couples are going to host a wedding party at the house tonight but the other couple are still there with their boxes and stuff.

== Cast ==
- Reza Attaran as Mohsen Tootoonchi
- Pantea Bahram as Mojgan
- Negar Javaherian as Elahe
- Ahmad Mehranfar as Farhad
- Alireza Ostadi as Driver
- Mohammad Kart as Driver's Assistant
- Afsaneh Tehranchi as Elahe's Mother
- Amir Alikhani as Sina
- Behnam Sharfi as Satellite guy

== Controversy ==
The film was theatrically released in Iran on November 28, 2012, but after a few days, the release of the film in Qom was stopped by the order of the General Directorate of Guidance of this province.

National Iranian Radio and Television has also refused to air the promotional teasers of the film on TV.

== Reception ==
=== Accolades ===
Year	Award	Category	Recipient	Result	Ref.
2013	Iran's Film Critics and Writers Association	Best Film	Abdolreza Kahani	Nominated	
2013	Iran's Film Critics and Writers Association	Best Director	Abdolreza Kahani	Nominated	
2013	Iran's Film Critics and Writers Association	Best Actor	Reza Attaran	Honorary Diploma	
2013	Iran's Film Critics and Writers Association	Best Actress	Pantea Bahram	Nominated	
2013	Iran's Film Critics and Writers Association	Best Supporting Actress	Negar Javaherian	Nominated	
2013	Iran's Film Critics and Writers Association	Best Supporting Actor	Ahmad Mehranfar	Nominated	
