= The Actor (1993 film) =

Honarpisheh
- Directed by: Mohsen Makhmalbaf
- Written by: G. Dordi; Mohsen Makhmalbaf
- Produced by: Yasmine Nour
- Starring: Akbar Abdi; Fatemah Motamed-Aria; Mahaya Petrossian
- Cinematography: Aziz Sa'ati
- Edited by: Mohsen Makhmalbaf
- Music by: Ahmad Pezhman
- Release date: 1993
- Country: Iran
- Language: Persian

The Actor (Persian: هنرپیشه, romanized: Honarpisheh) is a 1993 Iranian film directed by Mohsen Makhmalbaf. The film features Akbar Abdi as Akbar, Fatemeh Motamed-Aria as his wife, Simin, and Mahaya Petrosian as the gypsy girl. The film is a combination of fiction and reality, since the leading character has the same name and occupation as the actor who portrays the role, while the details and events are fictional.

== Plot ==
An Iranian actor named Akbar is trying to become a serious actor instead of the clown everyone considers him to be. However, financial problems force him to abandon his dream of being an artistic actor. He also has to deal with his family problems and his wife's inability to become pregnant.
