= Sensitive Floor =

- Film poster
- Directed by: Kamal Tabrizi
- Written by: Peyman Qasemkhani
- Produced by: Javad Norouzbeigi
- Starring: Reza Attaran; Hootan Shakiba; Azadeh Samadi; Pantea Bahram; Sogol Ghalatian; Bahareh Rahnama; Mohammad Bahrani; Kazem Sayahi; Bahador Maleki; Peyman Qasemkhani; Reza Behboudi; Mohammad Reza Foroutan; Erfan Naseri; Lily Farhadpour
- Cinematography: Ali Tabrizi
- Edited by: Mostafa Kherghehpoosh
- Music by: Peyman Yazdanian
- Release date: 1 February 2014 (FIFF)
- Country: Iran
- Language: Persian

Sensitive Floor (Persian: طبقه هساث, romanized: 'Tabaghe-ye Hasas') is a 2014 Iranian drama film directed by Kamal Tabrizi and written by Peyman Qasemkhani. The film screened for the first time at the 32nd Fajr Film Festival where it was nominated for four awards and won one, the Crystal Simorgh for Best Actor (Reza Attaran).

== Cast ==
- Reza Attaran as Mr. Kamali
- Hootan Shakiba as Hassan
- Azadeh Samadi as
- Pantea Bahram as Forough Tahvildari
- Sogol Ghalatian as Zari
- Bahareh Rahnama as Behnam Mohtasham's wife
- Mohammad Bahrani as Parviz
- Kazem Sayahi as Jalal
- Bahador Maleki as Rasoul
- Peyman Qasemkhani as Behnam Mohtasham
- Reza Behboudi as Gravestone calligrapher
- Mohammad Reza Foroutan as Haj Agha / Building painter
- Erfan Naseri as
- Lily Farhadpour as Aunt (Mr. Kamali's sister)
- Nader Falah as Yaghoub
