= Atash Taqipour =

Iranian theater, cinema and TV actor (born 1945)

Atash Taqipour آتش تقی‌پور
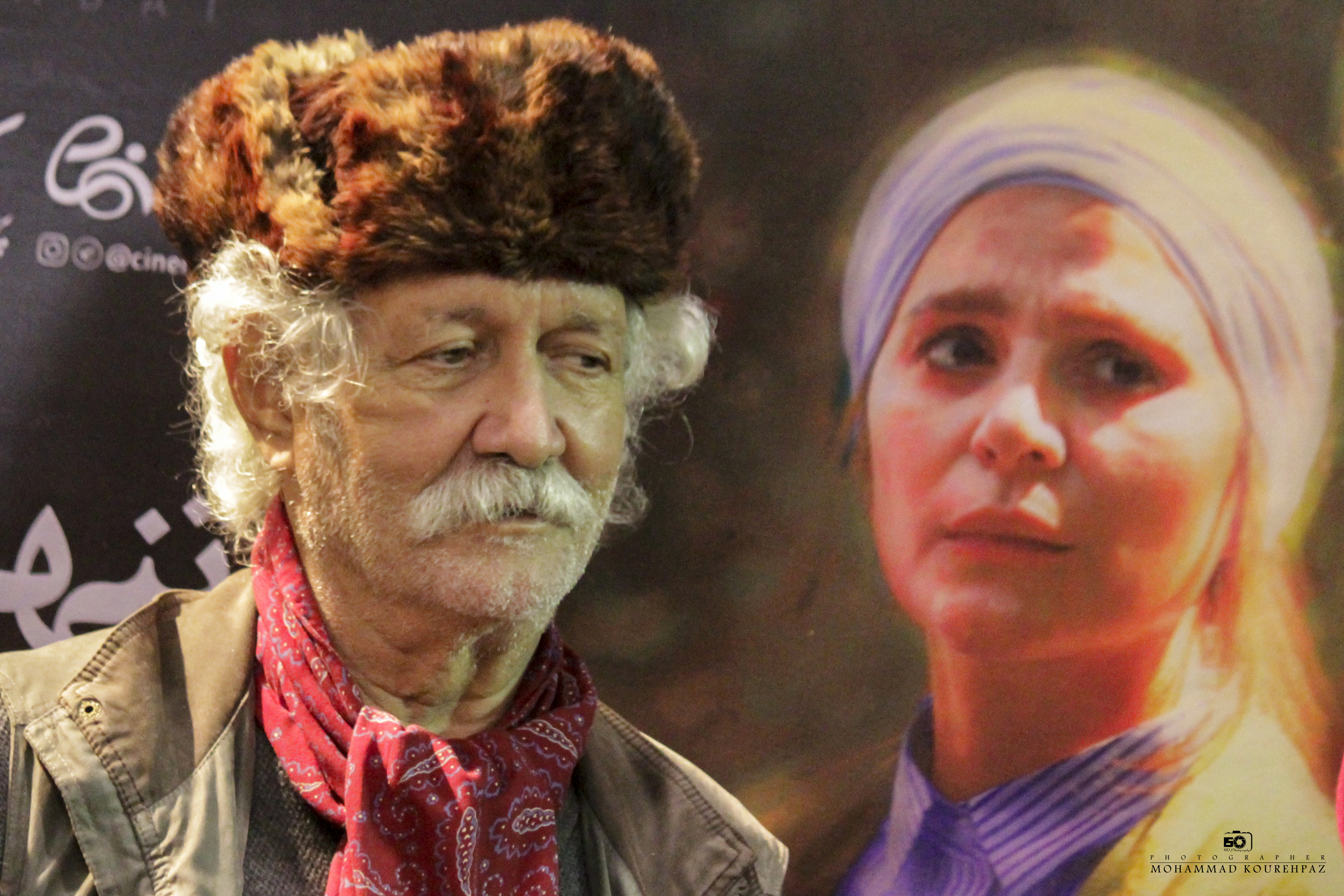
- Born: April 4, 1945 (age 80); Khoy, Iran
- Occupation(s): Theatre and film actor
- Spouse: Shahin Alizadeh

Atash Taqipour (Persian: آتش تقی‌پور, was born 1945 in khoy, West Azerbaijan) is an Iranian theater, cinema and TV actor. Taqipour has played in famous movies in TV and Cinema such as Shaheed-e-Kufa, Dame sobh and Mosafer.

== Filmography ==
=== Cinema ===
- Exodus (2020)
- Heritage Villa (1403, Nima Hashemi)
- Staging (2019, Alireza Samadi)
- Atabai (2018, Niki Karimi)
- Exit (2018, Ebrahim Hatami Kia)
- Shin (2017, Meisham Kazzazi)
- Day Break (2005)

=== Television ===
- Mastooran (2024)
- Behind the Tall Mountains (2012)
- The Gun Loaded (2002-2003)
- Tenth Night (2002)
- Mosafer (2000)
- Shaheed-e Kufa (1996-1997)
