= Beach Villa =

2023 Iranian comedy film directed by Kianoush Ayari

- Directed by: Kianoush Ayari
- Written by: Kianoush Ayari
- Produced by: Reza Rakhshan
- Starring: Reza Attaran; Pejman Jamshidi; Rima Raminfar
- Cinematography: Dariush Ayari
- Edited by: Kianoush Ayari
- Music by: Omid Raiesdana
- Distributed by: Filmiran
- Release date: 6 December 2023 (Iran)
- Running time: 105 minutes
- Country: Iran
- Language: Persian
- Box office: 63,688,850,000 tomans

Beach Villa (Persian: ویلای ساحلی, romanized: Vilā-ye Sāheli) is a 2023 Iranian comedy film directed and written by Kianoush Ayari and produced by Reza Rakhshan. It stars Reza Attaran, Pejman Jamshidi, and Rima Raminfar. The film was theatrically released in Iran on December 6, 2023.

== Plot ==
The film follows a rural family who are hired to look after a villa for six months. Chavosh, the owner of the villa, plans to live outside Iran for six months while his daughter attends university and entrusts the villa to Younes (Pejman Jamshidi) and his wife (Rima Raminfar). They move into the villa with their three children. However, Younes's brother-in-law (Reza Attaran) arrives at the house and sets off a series of events.

== Cast ==
Ayari said that he had written the screenplay with Reza Attaran, Pejman Jamshidi, and Rima Raminfar in mind from the outset. Alongside these established actors, Ayari cast several newcomers who made their film debuts in the film.

- Reza Attaran as Farrokh
- Pejman Jamshidi as Younes
- Rima Raminfar as Mahnaz
- Fargol Farbakhsh as Sanaz
- Erfan Asefi as Saeed
- Yusef Khosravi as Majid
- Atoosa Anvarian as Azarnoosh
- Ali Sartipi as Mr. Chavoshi
- Mahdi Sharaki as Reza
- Nima Nourizadeh as Arash
- Kiumars Pourahmad

== Production ==
Ayari received a production permit for his fourteenth film on August 21, 2022. The film was initially titled Raker. Filming began in October 2022 in northern Iran under the title Beach Villa.

The film was completed in June 2023 after the post-production process was finished. It was subsequently released theatrically in Iran in December 2023.

In an interview with Saba News Agency, Ayari stated that the completed version of the film was 200 minutes long, while a 100-minute version was prepared for theatrical release. He also announced plans for a six-episode television series based on Beach Villa that would include scenes removed from the theatrical version.

== Festival submission ==
In January 2023, Fars News Agency, citing Rouhollah Sohrabi, director general of the Cinema Organization's Office of Supervision, reported that Beach Villa had submitted an application to participate in the Fajr Film Festival. The report came amid a boycott of the festival by a number of Iranian artists. Ayari, however, stated that the film was not yet ready for release and would instead be prepared for release the following year.

== Kiumars Pourahmad's appearance ==
Kiumars Pourahmad made an honorary appearance in Beach Villa, which became his final film appearance. He died on April 5, 2023, several months after the film's production had ended.

According to Ayari, Pourahmad was in northern Iran during filming and stayed with the production for about a week. Ayari had written a film crew into the screenplay and offered Pourahmad the role of the director of the fictional crew, which he accepted. Ayari said that filming was completed on January 25, 2023, after which Pourahmad left the production; he died less than three months later.

== Reception ==
=== Box office ===
Beach Villa attracted 9,250 viewers on its opening day and grossed more than 510 million tomans. According to IRNA, the film's opening-day revenue and attendance were higher than those of the post-pandemic Iranian films Fossil and Hotel.

During its first week, Beach Villa ranked second in the Iranian weekly box-office chart behind Hotel, earning approximately 9 billion tomans and attracting about 200,000 viewers.

=== Critical response ===
Contemporary reviews were critical of the film. Afshin Aliyar, writing for Javan Online, described Beach Villa as weaker than other comedies in theaters and criticized its screenplay as clichéd and simplistic.

The website Fararu described the reactions to Ayari's film as contradictory and argued that it was inconsistent with the director's body of work.

In response to criticism of the film, Ayari said in an interview that he had made Beach Villa primarily to earn money and to compensate for financial losses resulting from the banning of several of his previous films. He said that he had sought to make an entertaining film that was not vulgar but could connect with audiences.
