= Parviz Abnar =

Iranian sound recordist (born 1958)

Parviz Abnar پرویز آبنار
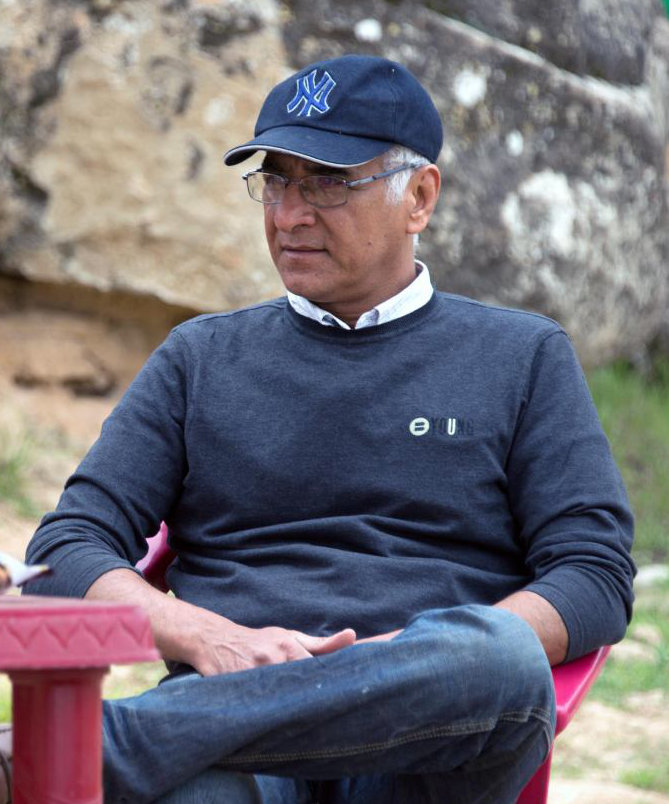
- Born: July 19, 1958 (age 66); Ahvaz, Iran
- Occupation: Sound recordist.

Parviz Abnar (Persian: پرویز آبنار, born 19 July 1958 in Ahvaz, Iran) is an Iranian sound recordist.

He graduated from the Academy of Cinema and Television in 1978. Abnar was the sound recordist for the film Rapport in 1986. He started working in television from 1978 as a sound recordist of news, documentary and fiction films and TV series such as Ra'na (1988).

He was awarded the Crystal Simorgh for sound recording from Fajr Film Festival for Across the Fire (1986, Kianoush Ayyari), The Last Act (1990, V. Karim-Masihi) and Nargess (1991, Rakhshan Bani-Etemad).

== Partial list of works ==
- The Little Bird of Happiness, 1987
- The Girl by the Pond, 1991
- The Wild Duck
- The Need, 1992
- The Satanic Contact
- Eclipse
- A Man and a Bear, 1989
- Zinat, 1993
- Disarmament
- The Blue-Veiled, 1994
- Banichaw
- The Poor Lover,
- Ghazal, 1995
- The Fifth Season
- The Miracle of Laughter, 1996
- The May Lady
- The Day When the Air Stopped
- The Lost Love, 1998
- The Girl in the Sneakers
- Two Women, 1999
- The Sun Girls, 1998
- Hidden Half
- Smell of Camphor, Fragrance of Jasmine, 2000
- Thousands of Women Like Me, 2000
- Shabhaye Roshan, 2003
- Arya, 2004
- Cafe Transit, 2005
- No Men Allowed, 2011
