= Good to Be Back (film) =

- Persian: چه خوبه که برگشتی
- Directed by: Dariush Mehrjui
- Written by: Dariush Mehrjui
- Produced by: Reza Dormishian; Dariush Mehrjui; Production Manager: Mehdi Badrloo
- Starring: Hamed Behdad; Mahnaz Afshar; Reza Attaran; Alireza Jafari; Homayoun Ershadi; Roya Teymourian; Hasan Pourshirazi
- Cinematography: Bahram Badakhshani
- Edited by: Hayedeh Safiyari
- Music by: Christophe Rezai
- Distributed by: Filmiran
- Release date: 29 May 2013
- Running time: 96 minutes
- Country: Iran
- Language: Persian

Good to Be Back (Persian: چه خوبه که برگشتی, romanized: Cheh khobeh keh bargashti) is a 2013 Iranian comedy-drama film directed by Dariush Mehrjui.

== Plot ==
Dentist Farzad (Hamed Behdad) has returned to Iran after many years abroad to escape his anxieties and daily stresses. Farzad is delighted to be reunited with his old friend, Kambiz (Reza Attaran), who has been his seaside neighbor for years. Upon his arrival in the Iran, a mysterious quasi-space object appears and causes Dr. Yasmin and her magic stones to enter Farzad's life, which threatens Farzad and Kambiz long friendship.

== Cast ==
- Hamed Behdad
- Mahnaz Afshar
- Reza Attaran
- Alireza Jafari
- Homayoun Ershadi
- Roya Teymourian
- Hasan Pourshirazi
- Mohammad Kart
- Ali Asghar Tabasi
- Razieh Faraji
