= Mahaya Petrosian =

Iranian actress of Armenian descent (born 1970)

- ماهایا پطروسیان
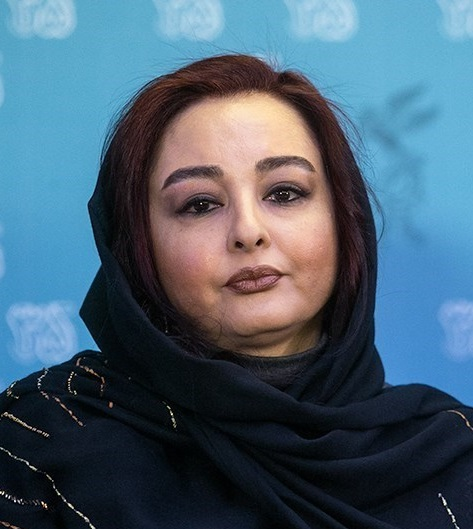
- In February 2017
- Born: 3 January 1970 (age 56); Tehran, Iran
- Occupation: Actress
- Years active: 1989–present
- Awards: Crystal Simorgh for Best Supporting Actress at the 9th Fajr International Film Festival for The Last Act (1991). Crystal Simorgh for Best Supporting Actress at the 19th Fajr International Film Festival for Seven Acts (2001).

Mahaya Petrosian (Persian: ماهایا پطروسیان, born 3 January 1970) is an Iranian actress of Armenian descent. She is also a director, A Beautiful Snowy Day being her first movie as director.

== Biography ==
Mahaya Petrosian was born in Tehran on January 4, 1970, and after earning a diploma, she went to the Faculty of Fine Arts and was able to graduate in theater from this university. Mahaya Petrosyan was from the Armenian minority living in Tehran and converted to Islam after marrying a Muslim man. Her first artistic activity was acting in the movie "Love and Death" directed by Mohammad Reza Alami and she entered the field of acting. Acting in this film did not have much work for him due to his small role, but by acting in the film The Last Act and his second cinematic activity, he was able to show his abilities.

== Filmography ==
Title	Title in English	Year	Director
Eshgh -o -Marg	Love and death	1989	Mohammadreza Alami
Pardeye akhar	The last act	1990	Varouzh Karim Masihi
Dighe che khabar !?	What else is new !?	1991	Tahmineh Milani
Naseredinshah, actor e cinema	Once upon a time cinema	1991	Mohsen Makhmalbaf
Honarpisheh	Actor	1993	Mohsen Makhmalbaf
Raze gole shab boo	The secret of the clove	1993	Saeed Khorshidian
Hasrate didar	Rendezvous wistfulness	1995	Moharam Zeinalzadeh
Sheikh-E-Mofid	Mofid, the sheikh	1995	Fariborz Saaleh
Nabakhshoudeh	Unforgivable	1996	Iraj Ghaderi
Ghasedak	The dandelion	1996	Ghasem Jafari
Komakam kon	Help me	1997	Rasoul Molla Gholipour
Haft pardeh	Seven acts	2000	Farzad Motamen
Dokhatry be name Tondar	A girl named Tondar	2000	Hamidreza Ashtianipour
Az samime ghalb	Wholeheartedly	2000	Bahram Kazemi
Aroosse khosh ghadam	The lucky bride	2002	Kazem Rastgoftar
Molaghat ba Tooty	Meeting with parrot	2003	Alireza Davoudnejad
Hashtpa	Octopus	2004	Alireza Davoudnejad
Entekhab	The choice	2004	Touraj Mansouri
Pishnehade 50 Miliooni	50 million proposal	2004–05	Mehdi Sabaghzadeh
Zan-e-Badali	Imitation Woman	2005	Mehrdad Mirfallah
Khabe Leila	Leila's dream	2006-07	Mehrdad Mirfallah
Mosahebe	Interview	2007	Bahram Kazemi
Entekhab	election	2008	Tooraj Mansoori
Asb Heyvan Najibist	Horses Are Noble Animals	2011	Abdolreza Kahani
Mojarad-e 40 Saleh	Single 40 years old	2014	Shahin Bababpour
Khafegi	Asphyxia	2017	Fereydoun Jeyrani

== See also ==
- Tahmineh Milani
- Mohsen Makhmalbaf
- Iranian cinema
- Persian women
