= Mostafa Azizi =

Iranian producer and screenwriter

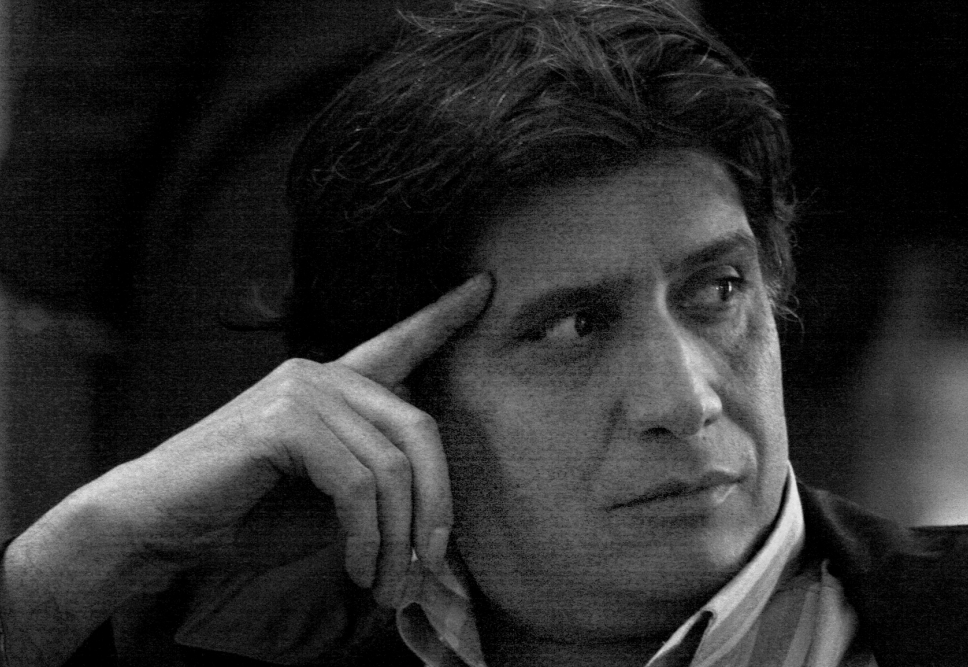
- Mostafa Azizi
- Born: September 20, 1962 (age 63); Arak, Iran
- Occupations: Film producer, screenwriter
- Years active: 1986–present
- Website: mostafazizi.net

Mostafa Azizi (Persian: مصطفی عزیزی) (born September 20, 1962) is an Iranian Television producer and screenwriter.

== Biography ==
Azizi was born in Arak. A graduate of theoretical economics from Tehran University, he started his professional life as a writer and editor of educational and scientific programs in the Iranian National Radio in 1986. In 1990, he moved to television and became the director of Computer Animation Unit (CAU). In 1994, he left the IRIB as an employee to open up the "Kelk-e-Khial" as a private film-producing company.

In 2010, a collection of short stories authored by him in the Persian language were published in Iran under the title of I am Raymond Carver. Carver, an American author of the 1960s, is said to be a major influence on his work. Since 2010, Azizi resides in Toronto where he is the director of Alternate Dream Productions Inc.

== Arrest ==
Azizi returned to Tehran to visit his relatives in January 2015. On February 1, he was arrested reportedly charged with "insulting Iran's supreme leader," Ayatollah Ali Khamenei, and also "spreading propaganda" against the Islamic establishment. The charges apparently stem from some of Azizi's social media posts, although it's not clear which.

On June 1, 2015, Branch 15 of the Islamic Revolutionary Court of Tehran sentenced Azizi to 8 years in prison. Abolqasem Salavati was the presiding judge of his court. As of June 29, Azizi is being kept in Section 8 of the Evin Prison waiting for the final decision of the court. He got released on April 9, 2016.

== Filmography ==
- Pendulum, feature film, Toronto, Canada, (2018)
- Gavsandough, TV series, (2008)
- Rahe Bipayan, TV series, (2007)
- Talash, Game show, (1996-2000)
- Mosafer, TV series, (2000)

== Bibliography ==
- I am Raymond Carver, Ofogh (2010)
- Shirin's Fortune (Rozegare Shirin), Elm (2016)
