= Vishka Asayesh =

Iranian actress

- ویشکا آسایش
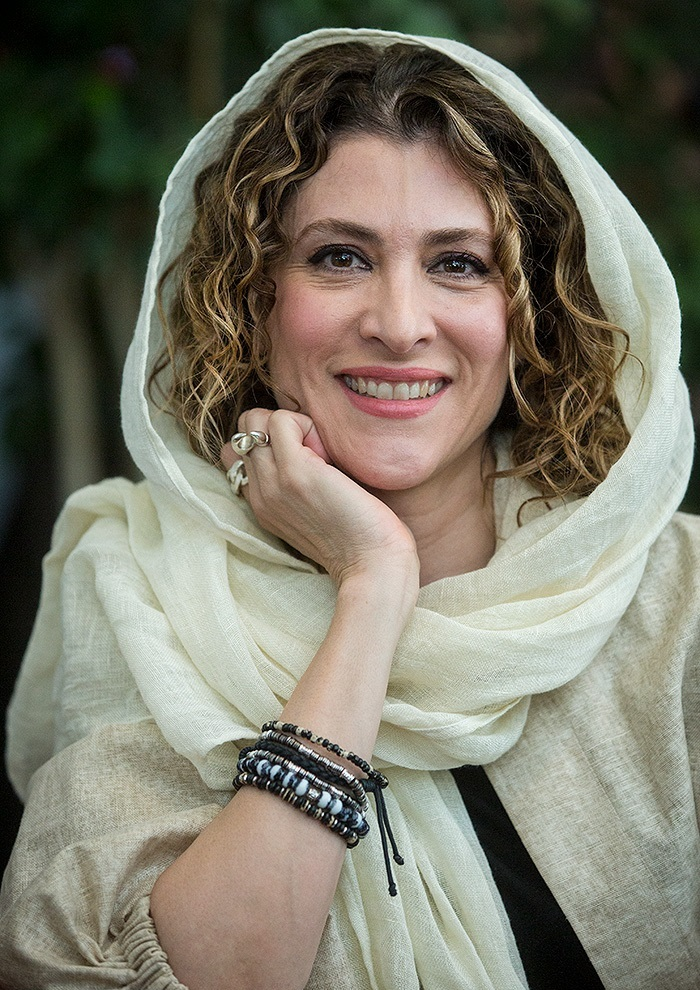
- Vishka in 2019
- Born: Tehran, Iran
- Education: London University
- Occupation: Actress
- Years active: 1996–present
- Spouse: Reza Ghobadi (m. 2000)
- Children: 1
- Relatives: Maziar Partow (uncle)

Vishka Asayesh (Persian: ویشکا آسایش) is an Iranian actress.

== Career ==
She obtained a degree in set design from the UK. She is also a sculptor and has exhibited her art works at Etemad Gallery in Tehran in 2012. Vishka became a household name after appearing in the historical TV series Imam Ali in 1992. She has appeared in Love + 2 (1998), The Visitor of Rey (2000), Ice Flower (2004), No Men Allowed (2011), Snow on the Pines (2011), Thirteen (2013), I am Diego Maradona (2014), and Sperm Whale (2015).

Her appearance in No Men Allowed (2011) won a Crystal Simorgh for Best Actress in a Leading Role at the Fajr International Film Festival in 2011. She was nominated and won the best actress award several times at international film festivals for acting in the 2020 movie The Badger, directed by Kazem Mollaie.

== Filmography ==
=== Film ===
Year	Title	Role	Director	Notes	Ref(s)
1998	The Sorceress	Ra'na / Lady	Davoud Mirbagheri		
2008	Shirin	Woman in audience	Abbas Kiarostami		
2011	No Men Allowed	Bita Darabi	Rambod Javan		
2015	I Am Diego Maradona	Farzaneh	Bahram Tavakoli		
2015	Sperm Whale	Farnaz Shahib	Saman Moghaddam		
2016	Dracula	Susan	Reza Attaran		
2017	Sperm Whale: Roya's Selection	Farnaz Shahib	Saman Moghaddam		
2018	Pig	Herself	Mani Haghighi	Cameo	
2018	Sly	Diba Solati	Kamal Tabrizi		
2019	My Second Year in College	Mrs. Nozad	Rasoul Sadrameli		
2019	We Are All Together	Razieh	Kamal Tabrizi		
2020	The Badger	Soodeh Sharifzadegan	Kazem Molaee		
2022	The Night Guardian		Reza Mirkarimi	Cameo	
2023	Left, Right		Hamed Mohammadi		
2024	Seven Days		Ali Samadi Ahadi		

=== Web ===
Year	Title	Role	Director	Platform	Notes	Ref(s)
2019	Blue Whale	Morvarid Parsa	Fereydoun Jeyrani	Filimo	Main role	
2021	Dracula	Zhaleh Kabiri	Mehran Modiri	Filimo, Namava	Main role	
2022–2023	Once Upon a Time Mars	Luna New Akbari / Luna's mother	Peyman Ghasemkhani, Mohsen Chegini	Filimo, Namava	Main role	
2022–2023	The Innocent	Mahtab Joudaki	Mehran Ahmadi	Filimo	Main role	

== Awards and nominations ==
- Best Actress for No Men Allowed (2011), (dir. Rambod Javan) at the Fajr International Film Festival in 2011.
- Best Actress and Best Ensemble Cast for The Badger, (dir. Kazem Mollaie) at the “19th. Riverside International Film Festival” (USA) / April 2021
- Nominated for the Best Female Actor for The Badger, (dir. Kazem Mollaie) at the “11th. Queens World Film Festival” (USA) / July 2021
- Special Jury Award for Acting for The Badger, (dir. Kazem Mollaie) at the “37th. Los Angeles Asian Pacific Film Festival”, Academy Awards® Qualifying (USA) / Sept. 2021 (The jury shared: “Asayesh commands your attention as the fiercely independent Soodah, an entrepreneur and mother starting her second marriage when tragedy strikes. She is a modern woman in modern Iran, who must face the humiliation of seeking help from various authority figures while maintaining her dignity. She gives a stunning performance that invites you into the complexity of her world.”)
- Best Actress for The Badger, (dir. Kazem Mollaie) at the “10th. Winter Film Awards International Film Festival” (USA) / Oct. 2021
- Best Actress for The Badger, (dir. Kazem Mollaie) at the “6th. Calella Film Festival” [Low Budget Section] (SPAIN) / Oct. 2021
