= Nader Moghaddas =

- نادر مقدس
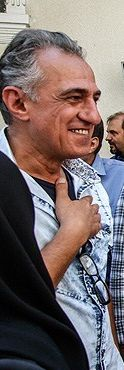
- Moghaddas in 2014
- Born: Nader Moghaddas; April 17, 1958 (age 68); Amol, Iran
- Occupations: Film director Screenwriter; Producer
- Years active: 1990–present
- Website: nmoghaddas.com

Nader Moghaddas (Persian: نادر مقدس; born 1958 in Amol) is an Iranian film director, screenwriter and film producer.

== Filmography ==
- The song of Tehran — 1992
- The Purple Plain — 1994
- The Passion of Love — 2000
- Young Dreams — 2003
- Dobare Zendegi — 2004
- Istgahe Behesht — 2006
- Family Bond — 2011
- Parvandeyi baray-e Sara — 2017
- Herring — 2019
