= Mosafer =

Qatari retail chain

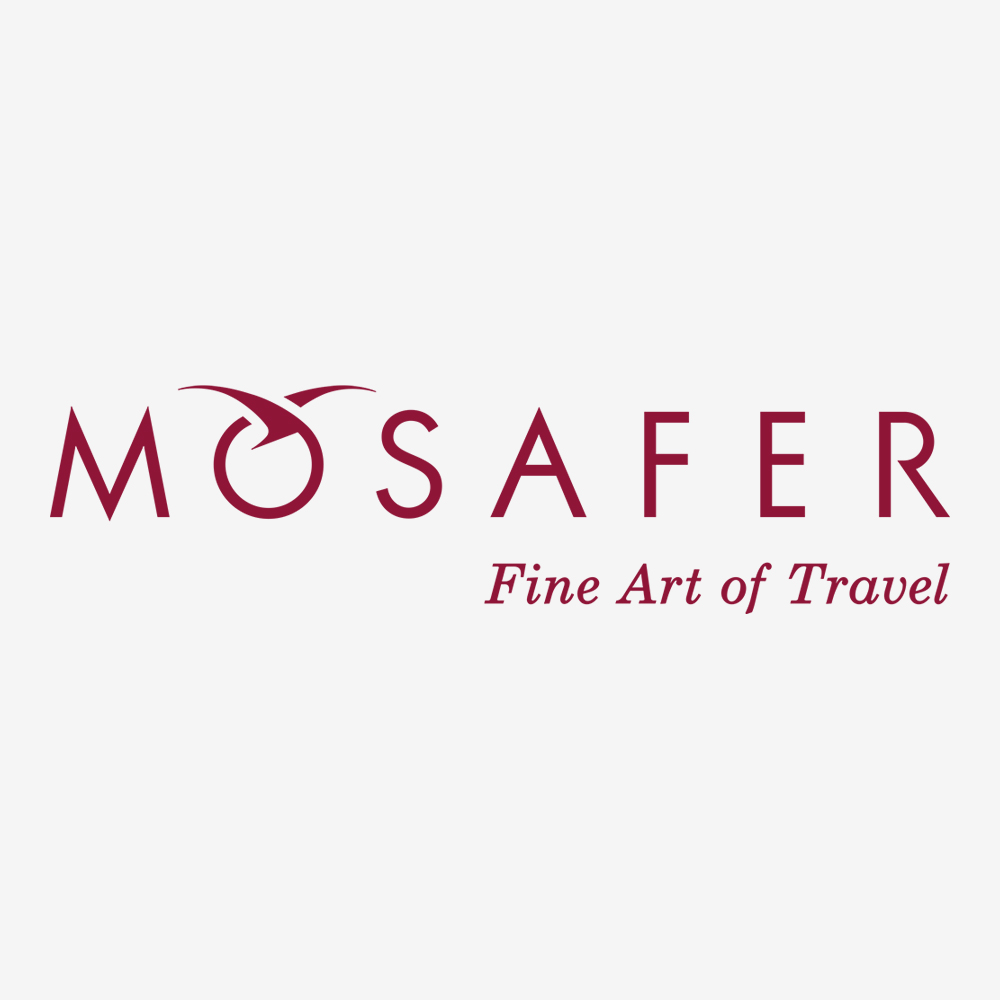
- Company type: Private
- Industry: Travel and Tourism
- Founded: 2011
- Founder: Ashraf Abdulrahim Abuissa
- Headquarters: Doha, Qatar
- Areas served: Qatar, UAE, KSA, Turkey, US
- Parent: Abu Issa Holding
- Website: mosafer.com abuissa.com

Mosafer Inc. is a Qatari owned global travel retail store headquartered in Doha, Qatar and is best known as a luggage manufacturer and retailer. The company has 32 locations worldwide with its biggest flagship store located on 57th street in Manhattan, New York. Mosafer is Abuissa Holding’s self developed concept focusing on travel led by founder Ashraf AbdulRahim Abuissa.

== Etymology ==
The word, Mosafer, means “traveler" in Arabic, Turkish, Urdu and Persian. The term directly associates the company with its customers who are all travelers.

== History ==
Mosafer Inc. was established in 2011, but also secondarily sells its products on an online platform. The company was founded by the Ernst & Young Entrepreneur of the Year Award winner, Ashraf Abdulrahim Abuissa.

Comprising a mainstream industry Neuro-Retail department and specialized product development team, Mosafer focuses on the requirements of its customers. Mosafer has 32 associated stores in 6 countries which mainly provide travel accessories, backpacks and known brands.

The company focuses on the tourism industry and has received the Gold Achiever award for two consecutive years for being the top agent country-wide.
