= Jamal Ejlali =

Iranian actor (1947–2025)

- جمال اجلالی
- Born: Jamal Ejlali; 10 June 1947; Tehran, Iran
- Died: 29 June 2025 (aged 78)
- Occupation: Iranian actor
- Years active: 1969–2025

Jamal Ejlali (Persian: جمال اجلالی; 10 June 1947 – 29 June 2025) was an Iranian actor in theatre, film and television.

== Life and career ==
Ejlali was born in Tehran on 10 June 1947, and was educated at the Faculty of Fine Arts. In 1989, he starred in the feature film, All the Temptations of the Earth, directed by Hamid Samandarian. He also established himself in the theater, acting in a number of productions including "The Seagull" (1977), "The Marriage of Mr. Mississippi" (1989), and "The Caucasian Chalk Circle" (1998).

Ejlali died in Tehran on 29 June 2025, at the age of 78.
