= Mortician (2025 film) =

2025 Canadian drama film

- Directed by: Abdolreza Kahani
- Written by: Abdolreza Kahani
- Produced by: Abdolreza Kahani
- Starring: Nima Sadr; Golazin Ardestani
- Cinematography: Abdolreza Kahani
- Edited by: Abdolreza Kahani
- Music by: Golazin Ardestani; Schubert Avakian
- Production company: NivaArt
- Distributed by: Visit Films
- Release date: August 16, 2025 (Edinburgh)
- Running time: 94 minutes
- Country: Canada
- Language: Persian

Mortician is a Canadian drama film, directed by Abdolreza Kahani and released in 2025. The film stars Nima Sadr as Mojtaba, an Iranian expatriate living in Canada, where he works for a company that washes dead bodies in accordance with Islamic funeral customs.When he receives notice from his boss (Mehdi Salar) that the company is shutting down and he should consider moving back to Iran, he is approached by Jana (Golazin Ardestani), an Iranian pop star also in exile who intends to commit suicide as a social media protest to raise awareness among her fans of government oppression in Iran.

Kahani shot the film entirely on an iPhone, with no other camera or sound equipment.

== Distribution ==
The film premiered on August 16, 2025, at the Edinburgh International Film Festival, where it was the winner of the Sean Connery Prize for Excellence in Filmmaking.

== Critical response ==
Guy Lodge of Variety wrote that the film "is for the most part an intimate, exploratory two-hander, as a macabre business arrangement evolves into a closer, more interdependent relationship between two people caught between the same two worlds — though their connection stops shy of improbable romance. The director frequently frames the pair in tight, fraught two-shots: His pocket-device cinematography, however economical, is never careless, attentive to the pale desolation of the surrounding landscape and the stark dimness of Jana’s home."

For Screen Daily, Jonathan Romney stated that the fim "shows a trenchant edge in evoking the darkest aspects of exile, especially for those who face punitive reprisals. Gola’s own real-life experience of surveillance and threat are one source of inspiration for a film that starts out subtly troubling, then hits harder once we come to realise the ultimate stakes of the drama."
