= Davat =

Davat دعوت
- Village
- Location within Iran
- Coordinates: 33°35′40″N 59°33′29″E
- Country: Iran
- Province: South Khorasan
- County: Zirkuh
- Bakhsh: Zohan
- Rural District: Afin

Population (2006)
  - Total: 80
- Time zone: UTC+3:30 (IRST)
  - Summer (DST): UTC+4:30 (IRDT)

Davat (Persian: دعوت, also Romanized as Da‘vat and Dāwāt) is a village in Afin Rural District, Zohan District, Zirkuh County, South Khorasan Province, Iran. At the 2006 census, its population was 80, in 22 families.
