= Merila Zarei =

Iranian actress (born 1974)

- مریلا زارعی
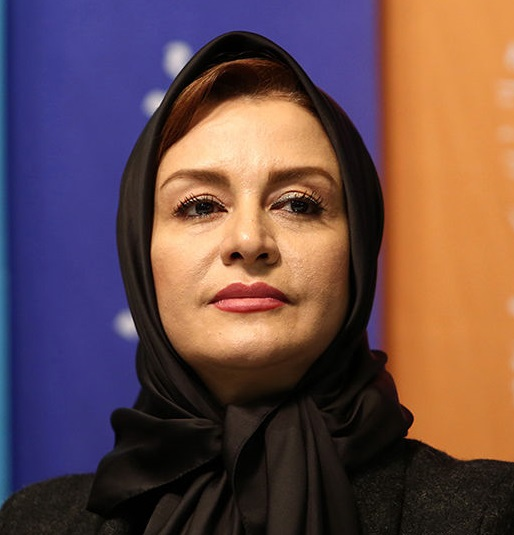
- Zarei at the 2019 Fajr Film Festival
- Born: April 14, 1974 (age 52); Tehran, Iran
- Education: Azad University
- Occupation: Actress
- Years active: 1994–present
- Relatives: Melika Zarei (Sister)

Merila Zarei (Persian: مریلا زارعی; born April 14, 1974) is an Iranian actress. She has received various accolades, including a Silver Bear, three Crystal Simorghs, four Hafez Awards, four Iran Cinema Celebration Awards and an Iran's Film Critics and Writers Association Award.

== Life and career ==
A graduate of Azad University of Tehran, during her studies she became interested in acting through Ezatollah Entezami's acting courses.

Her first movie was Patak by Ali Asghar Shadravan in 1994. She received the Crystal Simorgh for the best actress in a supporting role for The Friday's Soldiers (2005, Masoud Kimiai), from the 23rd Fajr International Film Festival. She is also the winner of best actress of 32nd Fajr International Film Festival.

== Filmography ==
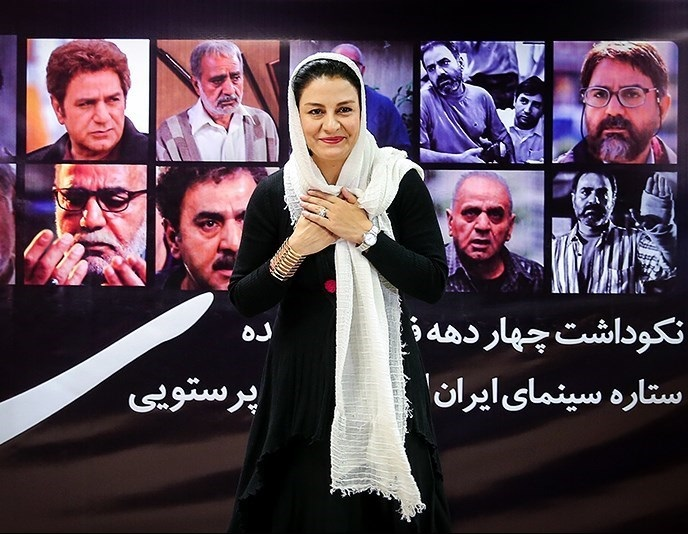
Merila Zarei in Parviz Parastui's commemoration ceremony, 9 March 2016

Movies:

- Patak by Ali Ashghar Shadervan (1994)
- Ruy-e Khat-e Marg directed by Shafi Aghamohammadian (1995)
- Zan-e Sharghi directed by Rambod Lotfi (1996)
- Khalaban directed by Jamal Shurjeh (1996)
- Do Zan (Two Women) directed by Tahmineh Milani (1999)
- Tekyeh bar bad directed by Dariush Farhang (1999)
- The Fifth Reaction (The 5th Reaction) directed by Tahmineh Milani (2001)
- Eshgh-e Film directed by Ebrahim Vahidzadeh (2001)
- Ham Nafas directed by Mehdi Fakhimzadeh (2002)
- Mo'ādeleh directed by Ebrahim Vahidzadeh (2002)
- Sizdah Gorbeh ruy-e Shirvani directed by Ali Abdolalizadeh (2002)
- Sarbazhaye jome (Friday's Soldiers) directed by Masoud Kimiayie (2002)
- Mojaradha directed by Asghar Hashemi (2003)
- The Unwanted Woman directed by Tahmineh Milani (2005)
- Zagros directed by Mohammad Ali Najafi (2004)
- Hokm (Verdict) directed by Masoud Kimiayie (2004)
- Pāpital (Hedera helix) directed by Ardeshir Shelileh (2005)
- Dasthaye khali directed by Abolqasem Talebi (2007)
- Invitation (Davat) directed by Ebrahim Hatamikia (2008)
- About Elly, directed by Asghar Farhadi (2009)
- Keyfar directed by Hassan Fathi
- Digari directed by Mehdi Rahmani
- Nader and Simin, A Separation, directed by Asghar Farhadi (2011)
- I Feel Sleepy directed by Reza Attaran (2012)
- Bear directed by Khosro Masumi
- Hush! Girls Don't Scream directed by Pouran Derakhshandeh (2012)
- Golden Regime directed by Reza Sobhani
- Everything for sale directed by Amir Hossein Saghafi (2012)
- Che directed by Ebrahim Hatamikia (2012)
- Track 143 directed by Narges Abyar (2013)
- The Little Black Fish directed by Majid Esmaeili (2015)
- Bodyguard Ebrahim Hatamikia (2016)
- Under the Smoky Roof (2017)
- Henas (2022)

TV series:

- The Sea People directed by Siroos Moghaddam
- Mannequin directed by Hossein Soheilizadeh
- Jeyran directed by Hassan Fathi
- Viper of Tehran directed by peyman moadi
- Asphalt Forest directed by pajman timortash

== Awards and nominations ==
- Won Crystal Simorgh Best Actress - 32nd Fajr International Film Festival (2014), 35th Fajr International Film Festival (2017)
- nominated Track 143 Best Actress - 8th Asia Pacific Screen Awards (2014)

== View on the Iran War 2026 ==
Her support for Iran during the 2026 Iran war: "Tell the defenders of this land that you are the true sons of Iran, we are proud of you and thank God that we have found the happiness of living in a time when you great men created such an epic. In the history of this land, your courage and faith will be taught to future generations and I hope to be a student of this glorious class as long as I live."

== See also ==
- Iranian women
- Iranian cinema
- List of famous Persian women
- List of Iranian actresses
