= Pantea Bahram =

Iranian actress

- پانته‌آ بهرام
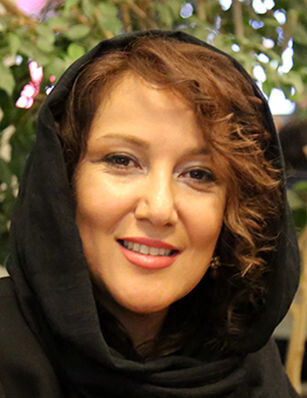
- Bahram at the 2018 Fajr International Film Festival
- Born: 4 March 1970 (age 56); Tehran, Iran
- Education: University of Tehran
- Occupation: Actress
- Years active: 1988–present

Pantea Bahram (Persian: پانته‌آ بهرام; born 4 March 1970) is an Iranian actress. She has received various accolades, including a Crystal Simorgh and an Iran Cinema Celebration Award, in addition to nominations for six Hafez Awards and four Iran's Film Critics and Writers Association Awards.

== Biography ==
Pantea Bahram was born in 1970 in Tehran, Iran. She attended the school of Arts and Literature at the Islamic Republic of Iran Broadcasting College and began her acting career in theater in 1988. She first became well known as an actor for her role in Mosafer (The Passenger).

Bahram directed the play "Made in Iran" ("Avazhick") in 2005, which was also staged in Finland in 2007.

Bahram boycotted the Fajr International Film Festival in protest of the government's crackdown of the 2025–2026 Iranian protests.

== Filmography ==
=== Cinema ===
- 1999: Zesht-o ziba
- 2000: Through Sunglasses
- 2003: Banoo-ye man
- 2003: Tokyo bedoone tavaghof
- 2005: Eternal Children
- 2006: Fireworks Wednesday
- 2008: Sandali khali
- 2008: Shirin
- 2009: Endless Dreams
- 2009: Khabhaye Donbaledar
- 2009: Postchi se bar dar nemizanad
- 2010: Farewell Baghdad
- 2010: Hich
- 2010: Tehran, Tehran
- 2011 : Asb heyvan-e najibi ast
- 2012: Needlessly and Causelessly
- 2012: Man Madar Hastam
- 2012: Migren
- 2013: Tabaghe ye Hasas
- 2013: The Bright Day
- 2014: Biganeh
- 2014: Sensitive Floor
- 2014: Tragedy
- 2015: Marge Mahi
- 2015: The Nameless Alley
- 2016: Gozar movaghat
- 2021: Butterfly Stroke
- 2022: Killing a Traitor
- 2022: Drown

=== Television ===
Year	Title	Role	Network
1987	Mirror		
1993	Hamzeh Gholi Khan Family		IRIB TV1
2000	Mosafer (The Passenger)	Manije Khakbaz	IRIB TV5
2009	The Searchers	Mrs. Soodabeh Fazli	IRIB TV2
2015	Misunderstanding of a dream		IRIB TV1
2018	Lovers	Afsaneh Meshkat	IRIB TV3
2021	Queen of Beggars	Khorshid	
2022–2023	The Lion Skin	Leila Barzegar	Filmnet

== Awards and nominations ==
Year	Award	Category	Nominated work	Result									
2007	Iran Cinema Celebration Award		Forever Young	Nominated	2012	Fajr International Film Festival	Best Actress in a Leading Role	Bright Day	2016	18th Khaneh Cinema Awards	Best Supporting Actress	Alley Anonymous	Nominated
