= Abdolreza Kahani =

Iranian filmmaker (born 1973)

- عبدالرضا کاهانی
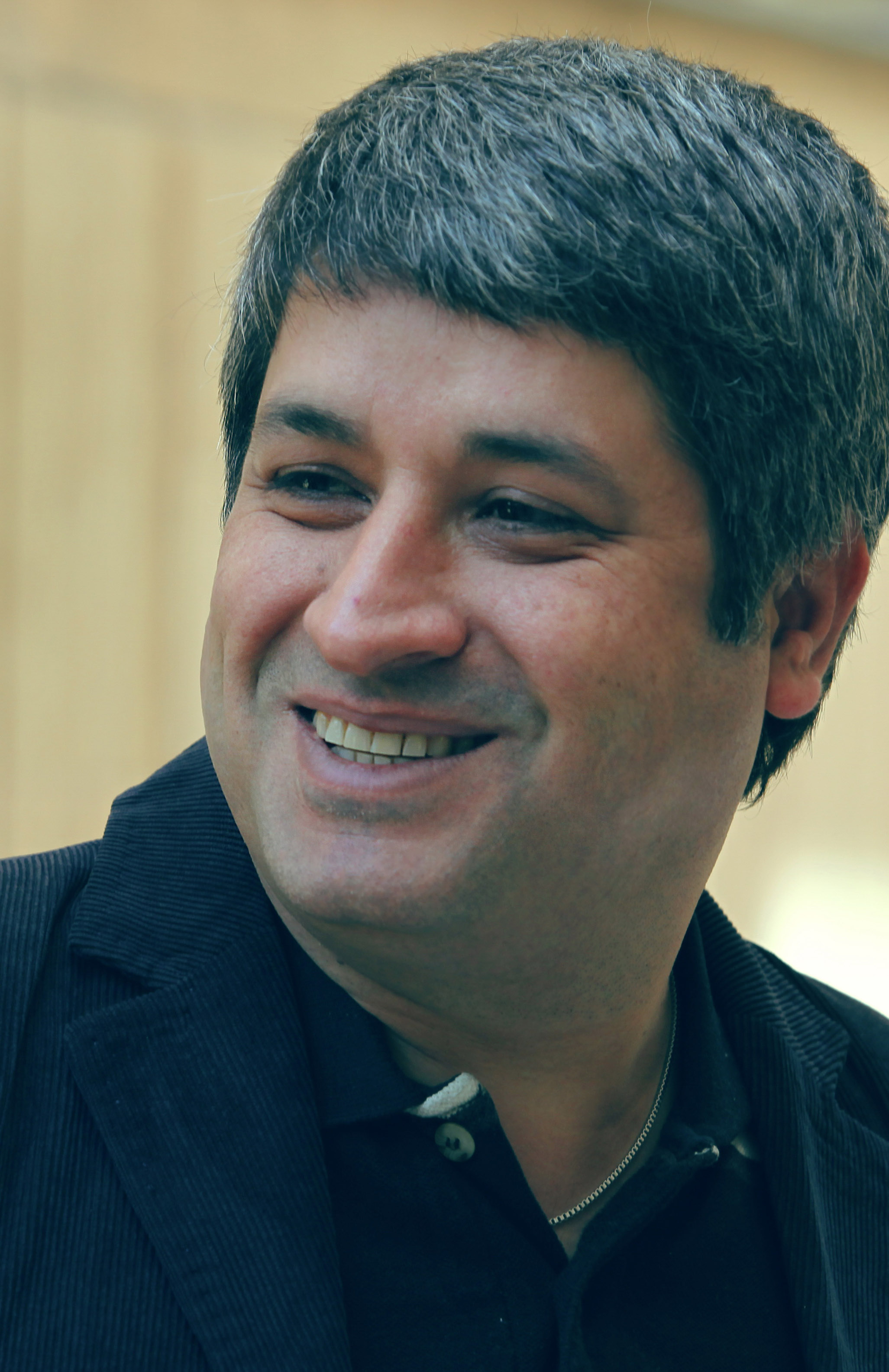
- Born: 22 December 1973 (age 52); Nishapur, Khorasan, Iran
- Other name: Reza
- Education: University of Tehran (M.A.); University of Arak (B.A.)
- Occupations: Director, screenwriter
- Years active: 1988–present
- Spouse: Shima Monfared

Abdolreza Kahani (Persian: عبدالرضا کاهانی; born 22 December 1973) is an expatriate Iranian filmmaker, who works principally in France and Canada.

He made his first short film, The Smile, in 1988. He made his first feature film, Dance with the Moon, in 2003.

In 2009, Kahani's film Twenty won the Special Jury Prize and the Prize of Ecumenical Jury at the 44th Karlovy Vary International Film Festival. The film observes a small band of employees trying to save a depressed Iranian banquet hall which the owner has decided to close in 20 days.

Several of his films were censored for political reasons by the government of Iran, most notably the 2016 film Delighted. He emigrated to France in the mid-2010s, and has since worked with French and Canadian production companies.

Isthmus, released in 2021, marked his English-language debut. He subsequently released the films You Won't See Winter, Nina and A Shrine.

In 2025, his film Mortician won the Sean Connery Prize at the Edinburgh International Film Festival.

== Filmography ==
Year	English title	Original title	Transliteration	Award
2002	Travellers of Need	مسافران نیاز	Mosaferan Niaz	
2003	Empty Hands	باد به دستان	Baad Be Dastan	
2004	Dance with the Moon	رقص با ماه	Raghs Ba Mah	
2005	Crueltyville	ظلم آباد	Zolm Abad	
2007	Adam	آدم	Adam	
2008	Over There	آن جا	An Ja	Golden Alexander Thessaloniki International Film Festival 2008
2009	Twenty	بیست	Bist	Special Prize of the Jury Karlovy Vary International Film Festival 2009; Prize of the Ecumenical Jury Karlovy Vary International Film Festival 2009; Honorary Diploma Best Director Fajr International Film Festival 2009; Silver Award Damascus International Film Festival 2009
2010	Nothing	هیچ	Hich	Audience Award Yerevan International Film Festival 2010
2011	Horses Are Noble Animals	اسب حیوان نجیبی است	Asb Heyvane Najibi Ast	Special Jury Award Celebration of Iranian Cinema Critics 2011
2012	Needlessly and Causelessly	بی خود و بی جهت	Bikhod & Bi Jahat	Best Film of the Year Look Critics and Writers Film Magazine 2012
2014	We Have Time	On a le temps	Vaght Darim Hala	Independent Camera Karlovy Vary International Film Festival 2014
2015	Absolute Rest	استراحت مطلق	Esterahate Motlagh	
2016	Delighted	ارادتمند؛ نازنین، بهاره، تینا	Eradatmand; Nazanin, Bahareh, Tina	
2018	Miss Yaya	ما شما را دوست داریم خانم یایا	Ma shoma ra doust darim khanom yaya	
2019	Free Like Air	آزاد مثل هوا	Azad mesle Hava	
2021	Isthmus	Isthmus	Estakhr	
2022	You Won't See Winter			
2024	A Shrine			
2024	Nina			
2025	Mortician			
2026	Empty Heaven			

== Awards and honors ==
=== Awards ===
- Special Jury Award at the ran Cinema Celebration in 2011 for the film Horses Are Noble Animals
- Audience Award Yerevan International Film Festival 2010 for the film Nothing
- Special Prize of the Jury Karlovy Vary International Film Festival 2009 for the film Twenty
- Prize of the Ecumenical Jury Karlovy Vary International Film Festival 2009 for the film Twenty
- Honorary Diploma Best Director 27th Fajr International Film Festival 2009 for the film Twenty
- Silver Award Damascus International Film Festival 2009 for the film Twenty
- Golden Alexander Thessaloniki International Film Festival 2008 for the film Over There

=== Honors ===
- Critics' choice for movie of the year by Film Magazine in 2012 for By No Reason.

== See also ==
- Iranian cinema
