= Subtraction (film) =

- Film poster
- Directed by: Mani Haghighi
- Written by: Mani Haghighi; Amir Reza Koohestani
- Produced by: Majid Motalebi
- Starring: Taraneh Alidoosti; Navid Mohammadzadeh
- Cinematography: Morteza Najafi
- Edited by: Meysam Molaee
- Music by: Ramin Kousha
- Production company: Iranian Independents
- Distributed by: Films Boutique
- Release date: September 10, 2022 (TIFF)
- Running time: 107 minutes
- Country: Iran
- Language: Persian

Subtraction (Persian: تفریق, romanized: Tafrigh) is a 2022 Iranian noir thriller drama film co-written and directed by Mani Haghighi. The film stars Taraneh Alidoosti and Navid Mohammadzadeh. It had its world premiere at the Toronto International Film Festival on September 10, 2022.

== Premise ==
Farzaneh (Taraneh Alidoosti) is a young driving instructor who lives with her husband Jalal (Navid Mohammadzadeh). One day she spots her husband walking into an unknown woman’s house. When she confronts Jalal, he claims he wasn’t in town on that time. Later Jalal decides to check out the house for himself. When Jalal arrives there, he meets a woman named Bita who is the spitting image of Farzaneh. Stunned, the two compare their partners photos, Bita’s husband, Mohsen, also looks identical to Jalal.

== Cast ==
- Taraneh Alidoosti as Farzaneh and Bita
- Navid Mohammadzadeh as Jalal and Mohsen
- Soheila Razavi
- Saeed Changizian
- Ali Bagheri
- Vahid Aghapour
- Esmaeil Pourreza
- Farham Azizi
- Gilda Vishki

== Production ==
=== Pre-production ===
After the cast was announced on 23 May, 2020, the news agencies announced the collaboration between Navid Mohammadzadeh and Parinaz Izadyar. These two have previously appeared together in films such as Life and a Day (2016), 6.5 per Meter (2019), The Warden (2019) and Les Misérables (2018) play.

Haghighi called the reason for Izadyar’s transfer because of Corona and the commitment of the actors in other projects and said: "Parinaz Izadyar was so wonderful during our training that I am really sorry that this collaboration did not continue. On the other hand, I consider it a great blessing that Alidoosti had the opportunity to accompany us and will be by our side."

=== Filming ===
The filming of Subtraction started in 2020, and events such as the COVID-19 pandemic and the presence of Alidoosti instead of Parinaz Izadyar, made the film not to make it to the 40th Fajr Film Festival.

Initially, the film was supposed to be made in 2020, but after Haghighi contracted COVID-19, filming was delayed until March 2021. In April 2021, with large COVID-19 outbreaks and the declaration of a red state in Tehran, filming was stopped. Filming of Subtraction was finished in May 2021, and entered Post-production.

== Release ==
The film was supposed to be screened at the 40th Fajr Film Festival, but it was not able to participate in the festival because the Post-production was not completed.

The film had its world premiere in the Platform Prize program at the Toronto International Film Festival on September 10, 2022.
