= Navid Mohammadzadeh =

Iranian actor (born 1986)

- نوید محمدزاده
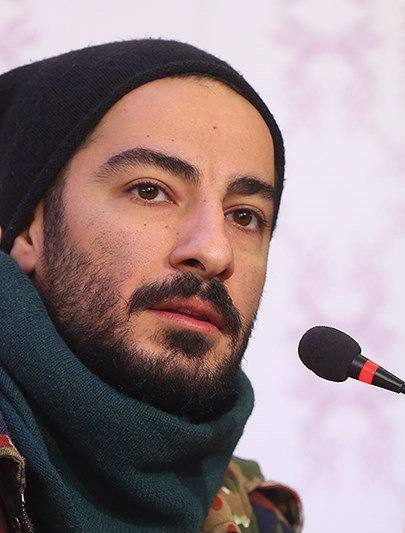
- Mohammadzadeh in 2016
- Born: April 6, 1986 (age 40); Mehran, Ilam, Iran
- Education: Civil engineering (AD)
- Occupation: Actor
- Years active: 2008–present
- Spouse: Fereshteh Hosseini (m. 2021)

Navid Mohammadzadeh (Persian: نوید محمدزاده, born April 6, 1986) is an Iranian actor. He has received various accolades, including two Crystal Simorghs, four Hafez Awards, three Iran Cinema Celebration Awards and four Iran's Film Critics and Writers Association Awards. In 2017, he won the Orizzonti Award for Best Actor at the 74th Venice International Film Festival for his performance in No Date, No Signature (2017).

== Early life ==
Navid Mohammadzadeh was born on April 6, 1986, in Mehran, Ilam, Iran. He is half Persian and half Iranian Kurdish. He has an associate degree in civil engineering.

== Personal life ==
On July 19, 2021, he officially announced his marriage to Fereshteh Hosseini via a post on his official Instagram account.

== Filmography ==
=== Film ===
Year	Title	Role	Director	Notes
2008	Among the Clouds	Bagher	Rouhollah Hejazi	
2009	Those Two		Behrouz Ghobadi	Unreleased film
2012	Videotape		Hossein Shaeri	Short film
2013	Fat Shaker	Officer	Mohammad Shirvani	
2013	Before Sunrise	Arash	Tahmineh Bahram Alian	Short film
2014	I'm Not Angry!	Navid	Reza Dormishian	
2014	Thirteen	Majid	Houman Seyyedi	
2014	Invitation to Tea		Ghasideh Golmakani	Short film
2014	The Very Uncrowded Street		Saeed Roustaee	Short film
2015	Nahid	Ahmad	Ida Panahandeh	
2016	Lantouri	Pasha	Reza Dormishian	
2016	Life and a Day	Mohsen	Saeed Roustaee	
2016	Sound and Fury	Khosrow Parsa	Houman Seyyedi	
2017	No Date, No Signature	Mousa Khanroudi	Vahid Jalilvand	
2017	Asphyxia	Masoud Sazgar	Fereydoun Jeyrani	
2018	Sheeple	Shahin	Houman Seyyedi	
2019	Just 6.5	Naser Khakzad	Saeed Roustaee	
2019	The Warden	Nemat Jahed	Nima Javidi	
2021	Two Dogs		Amir Azizi	as producer
2022	Leila's Brothers	Alireza Jourablou	Saeed Roustaee	
2022	Beyond the Wall	Ali	Vahid Jalilvand	
2022	Subtraction	Jalal / Mohsen	Mani Haghighi	
2024	Pressure Cooker	Shahin Solati	Rambod Javan	
2025	Oh, What Happy Days!		Homayoun Ghanizadeh	
2026	Black Wine		Ebrahim Ebrahimian	

=== Web ===
Year	Title	Role	Director	Platform	Notes
2020	Mutual Friendship	Himself	Shahab Hosseini	Namava	Talk show; 1 episode
2020–2021	The Frog	Noori	Houman Seyyedi	Namava	Main role; 15 episodes
2023	Actor	Ali Hemmati	Nima Javidi	Filimo, Namava	Main role; 20 episodes
2024	The Asphalt Jungle	Pasha Moghimi	Pejman Teymourtash	Namava	Main role
2026–present	Yal		Jamshid Mahmoudi	Filmnet	Main role

=== Television ===
Year	Title	Role	Director	Network	Notes
2011	Friends	Himself		Jame Jam TV	TV program
2012	Our Story, Your Story	Mehran's father	Reza Beheshti	Baran TV	TV film
2012	A Share for a Friend		Masoud Atyabi	IRIB TV2	TV series

== Theatre ==
Year	Title	Playwright	Director	Stage
2008	The Sunshine Boys	Neil Simon		
2009	Moon in the Swamp	Fars Bagheri	Mohammad Kooroshnia	Mehrab Theater
2010	The Dark Distance of the Stars			
2010	A Mouth Full of Birds	Fars Bagheri	Fars Bagheri	City Theater of Tehran
2011	Winter 66	Mohammad Yaghoubi	Mohammad Yaghoubi	City Theater of Tehran
2012	The Basement Window	Antonio Buero Vallejo	Ashkan Khilnejad	Molavi Hall
2012	The People Standing Above the Soup Hole	Jalal Tehrani	Ali Thaghafi	City Theater of Tehran
2012	Whispers Behind the Frontline	Alireza Naderi	Ashkan Khilnejad	Shahrzad Theater Complex
2013	The Dilapidated	Mohammad Man'am	Yousef Bapiri	Molavi Hall
2013	The Pillowman	Martin McDonagh	Mohammad Yaghoubi, Aida Keykhani	Arasbaran Cultural Center
2014	One Minute of Silence	Mohammad Yaghoubi	Aida Keykhani	Niavaran Cultural Center
2014	Emoticon	Naghmeh Samini	Kiumars Moradi	Diplomatic Echo Hall
2016	Bleach	Mehdi Koushki	Mehdi Koushki, Sahra Fatthi	Independent Theater of Tehran
2017	Whispers Behind the Frontline	Alireza Naderi	Ashkan Khilnejad	Shahrzad Theater Complex
2017	Oliver Twist	Charles Dickens	Hossein Parsai	Vahdat Hall
2018	Diabolic: Romeo and Juliet	Mohammad Charmshir (Based on Hamlet)	Atila Pesyani	Iranshahr Theater
2018	God of Carnage	Yasmina Reza	Ali Sarabi	Shahrzad Theater Complex
2018	The Flick	Annie Baker	Mohammad Hassan Majouni	City Theater of Tehran
2018	Les Misérables	Victor Hugo	Hosseini Parsai	Tehran Royal Hall
2019	The Pillowman	Martin McDonagh	Ali Sarabi	Shahrzad Theater Complex
2020	Qajari's Coffee	Atila Pesyani (Inspired by Hamlet)	Atila Pesyani	City Theater of Tehran
2024–2025	300	Mohammad Rahmanian	Sohrab Pournazeri	Sa'dabad Complex
2024–2025	Funfair	Navid Mohammadzadeh	Navid Mohammadzadeh	Labkhand Theater Complex

== Awards and nominations ==
Name of the award ceremony, year presented, category, nominee of the award, and the result of the nomination
Award	Year	Category	Nominated Work	Result	Ref.
Asia Pacific Screen Awards	2014	Best Performance by an Actor	I'm Not Angry!	Nominated	
Asia Pacific Screen Awards	2017	Best Performance by an Actor	No Date, No Signature	Nominated	
Asia Pacific Screen Awards	2017	High Commendation for Best Actor	No Date, No Signature	Won	
Asia Pacific Screen Awards	2019	Best Performance by an Actor	Just 6.5	Nominated	
Asia Pacific Screen Awards	2022	Best Performance	Beyond the Wall	Nominated	
Bratislava International Film Festival	2015	Best Actor	Nahid	Won	
Bratislava International Film Festival	2017	Best Actor	No Date, No Signature	Won	
CinemaCinema Academy Awards	2018	Best Actor	No Date, No Signature	Won	
CinemaCinema Academy Awards	2019	Best Actor	I'm Not Angry	Nominated	
CinemaCinema Academy Awards	2019	Best Actor	Sheeple	Won	
Fajr Film Festival	2014	Best Actor in a Leading Role	I'm Not Angry!	Nominated	
Fajr Film Festival	2016	Best Actor in a Supporting Role	Life and a Day	Won	
Fajr Film Festival	2016	Best Actor in a Leading Role	Sound and Fury	Nominated	
Fajr Film Festival	2017	Best Actor in a Supporting Role	No Date, No Signature	Won	
Fajr Film Festival	2018	Best Actor in a Leading Role	Sheeple	Nominated	
Fajr Film Festival	2019	Best Actor in a Leading Role	The Warden	Nominated	
Fajr Film Festival	2019	Best Actor in a Supporting Role	Just 6.5	Nominated	
Hafez Awards	2016	Best Actor – Motion Picture	Life and a Day	Won	
Hafez Awards	2017	Best Actor – Motion Picture	Lantouri	Won	
Hafez Awards	2018	Best Actor – Motion Picture	No Date, No Signature	Nominated	
Hafez Awards	2019	Best Actor – Motion Picture	Just 6.5	Nominated	
Hafez Awards	2019	Best Actor – Motion Picture	I'm Not Angry!	Nominated	
Hafez Awards	2019	Best Actor – Motion Picture	Sheeple	Won	
Hafez Awards	2020	Best Actor – Motion Picture	The Warden	Won	
Hafez Awards	2021	Best Actor – Television Series Drama	The Frog	Nominated	
Hafez Awards	2023	Best Actor – Television Series Drama	Actor	Nominated	
Hafez Awards	2024	Best Actor – Television Series Drama	The Asphalt Jungle	Nominated	
Iran Cinema Celebration	2016	Best Actor in a Supporting Role	Life and a Day	Won	
Iran Cinema Celebration	2017	Best Actor in a Leading Role	Lantouri	Nominated	
Iran Cinema Celebration	2018	Best Actor in a Leading Role	I'm Not Angry!	Nominated	
Iran Cinema Celebration	2018	Best Actor in a Leading Role	Asphyxia	Nominated	
Iran Cinema Celebration	2018	Best Actor in a Supporting Role	No Date, No Signature	Won	
Iran Cinema Celebration	2019	Best Actor in a Leading Role	Sheeple	Nominated	
Iran Cinema Celebration	2019	Best Actor in a Supporting Role	Just 6.5	Nominated	
Iran Cinema Celebration	2019	Best Actor in a Leading Role	The Warden	Won	
Iran's Film Critics and Writers Association	2014	Best Actor in a Leading Role	I'm Not Angry!	Won	
Iran's Film Critics and Writers Association	2015	Best Actor in a Supporting Role	Nahid	Nominated	
Iran's Film Critics and Writers Association	2016	Best Actor in a Leading Role	Sound and Fury	Nominated	
Iran's Film Critics and Writers Association	2016	Best Actor in a Leading Role	Lantouri	Nominated	
Iran's Film Critics and Writers Association	2016	Best Actor in a Supporting Role	Life and a Day	Won	
Iran's Film Critics and Writers Association	2017	Best Actor in a Leading Role	Asphyxia	Nominated	
Iran's Film Critics and Writers Association	2017	Best Actor in a Supporting Role	No Date, No Signature	Nominated	
Iran's Film Critics and Writers Association	2018	Best Actor in a Leading Role	Sheeple	Won	
Iran's Film Critics and Writers Association	2020	Best Actor in a Leading Role	The Warden	Nominated	
Iran's Film Critics and Writers Association	2020	Best Actor in a Supporting Role	Just 6.5	Nominated	
Iran's Film Critics and Writers Association	2020	Creativity in Acting	The Warden, Just 6.5	Won	
Las Palmas de Gran Canaria International Film Festival	2018	Best Actor	No Date, No Signature	Won	
Slemani International Film Festival	2018	Best Actor	No Date, No Signature	Won	
Tallinn Black Nights Film Festival	2018	Best Actor	No Date, No Signature	Won	
Tokyo International Film Festival	2019	Best Actor	Just 6.5	Won	
Urban International Film Festival	2017	Best Actor	Life and a Day	Nominated	
Urban International Film Festival	2019	Best Actor	Sheeple	Won	
Venice International Film Festival	2017	Orizzonti Award for Best Actor	No Date, No Signature	Won	
