= Hootan Shakiba =

Iranian actor (born 1984)

- هوتن شکیبا
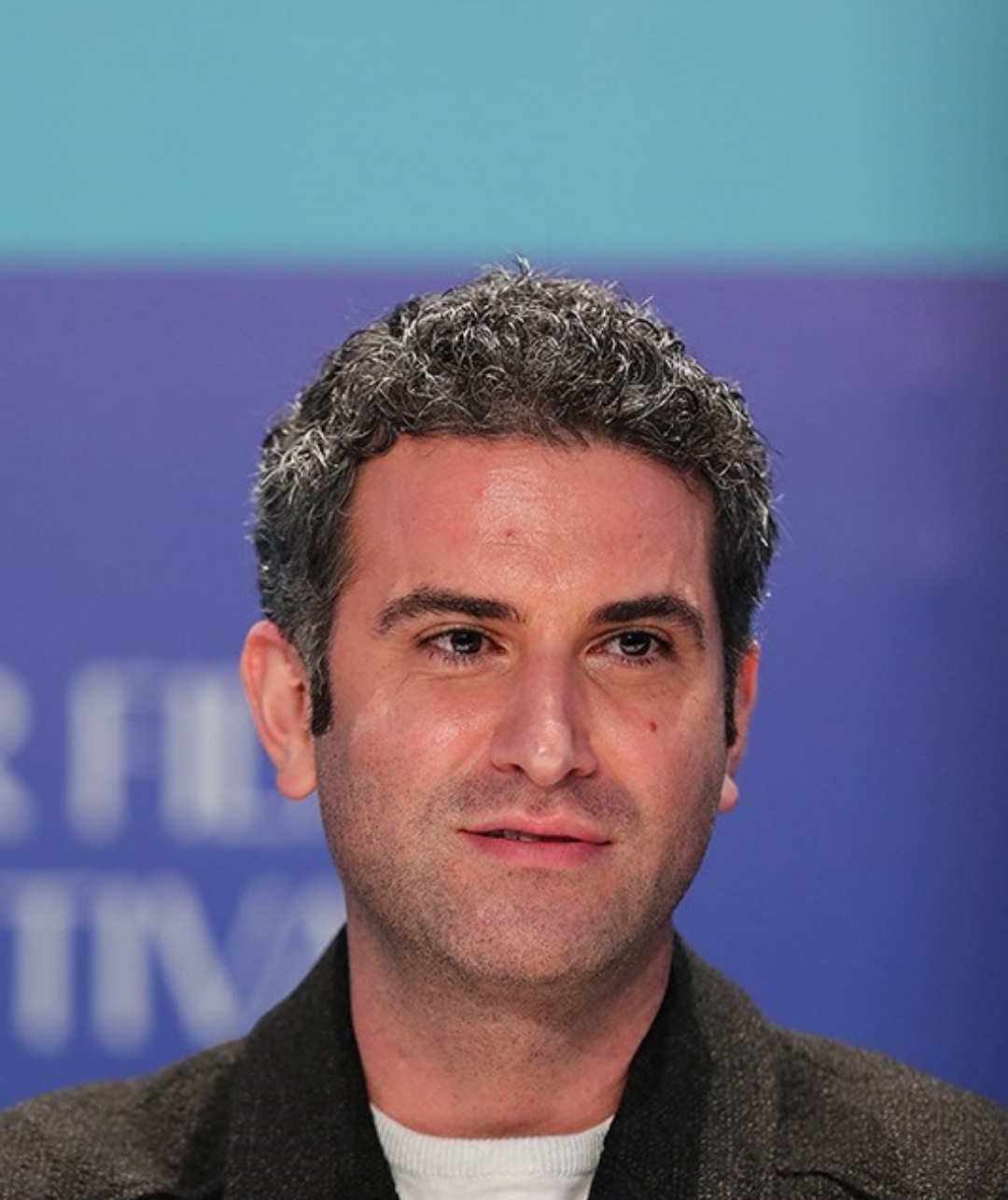
- Shakiba at the 2022 Fajr Film Festival
- Born: 14 June 1984 (age 42); Sanandaj, Kurdistan, Iran
- Education: Soore University (BFA); Tehran University of Art (MFA)
- Occupations: Actor; dubber; voice actor
- Years active: 2002–present

Hootan Shakiba (Persian: هوتن شکیبا; born 14 June 1984) is an Iranian actor. He is best known for his role as Habib Naghavi in Bachelors (2016–2019) which earned him a Hafez Award. Shakiba won the Crystal Simorgh for Best Actor and his second Hafez Award for portraying Abdolhamid Rigi in When the Moon Was Full (2019).

== Early life and education ==
Hootan Shakiba was born on 14 June 1984, in Sanandaj, Kurdistan, Iran to a Kurdish family and grew up there. He studied in Imam Mohammad Ghazali Governmental Leading Middle School. He received a Bachelor's degree in theater directing from Soore University and a Master's degree in acting from University of Arts.

== Career ==
=== 2008–2012: Career beginnings ===
Shakiba started acting at age 18 with working in theatre and short films. He played his first major and professional work in 2008 with Tune Your Violins play which earned him his first acting award at the 11th Iran International University Theater Festival.

In 2009 he played in Marat/Sade play and earned an Honorary Diploma at the 12th Iran International University Theater Festival.

In 2012 he acted in Mad Toy play and received the first place acting prize at the 19th International Children and Youth Theater Festival.

He played 21 plays between 2008–2012 and became known on theater industry.

=== 2013–2018: Feature debut and Bachelors ===
He made his feature debut with a supporting role in Kaveh Sajjadi Hosseini's Night Out as Tomaj. The film was screened at the 32nd Fajr Film Festival on experimental section then it released in February 2015 in Iran theatrically, two years after the film premiere.

In 2013, He starred in Voice of Silence and Sensitive Floor, both were also screened at the 32nd Fajr Film Festival and earned awards and nominations.

He received the Best Theater Actor of the Year Award at the 11th Theater Actor Celebration for his acting in Timequake (2013).

In 2014–2015 and in 2018 he did the voice acting for Dibi and The Next Door characters in the popular Red Hat television series directed by Iraj Tahmasb.

He also starred in Kamal Tabrizi's first web series Fool (2014–2015) as Mehrdad alongside Mohsen Tanabandeh, Hanieh Tavassoli, Mehran Ahmadi, Majid Salehi, Ahmad Mehranfar, Shabnam Moghaddami and Behnam Tashakor.

He earned a Best Theater Actor of the Year nomination at the 13th Theater Actor Celebration for his performance in The Hole (2015).

In 2016, Shakiba Starred in Bachelors television series directed by Soroush Sehat and gained a lot of recognition and became well known among the audience. He received critical acclaim for his performance as Habib and earned his first Hafez Award and a Jam-e-Jam Television Festival nomination.

In 2017 he played in Oliver Twist play as Fagin and received critical acclaim for his performance as well as a nomination for Best Actor at the 36th Fajr Theater Festival and a Special Acting Prize award at the 15th Theater Actor Celebration.

for his performance in the play 100% (2018) he received critical acclaim and an Honorary Diploma at the 36th Fajr Theater Festival.

In 2018 he earned his second Hafez Award nomination for Bachelors second season.

In 2018, Shakiba played as Monsieur Thénardier in the big production tragedy musical play Les Miserables, alongside Navid Mohammadzadeh, Parinaz Izadyar, Sahar Dolatshahi and Parsa Pirouzfar. Shakiba and Dolatshahi's acting as Monsieur Thénardier and Madame Thénardier was praised by the critics and both received Hafez Award nominations at the first Hafez Theater Award. The play was a commercial success.

He played 17 plays between 2013–2018 and gained attention.

=== 2019: Wide recognition through When the Moon Was Full ===
In 2019, He starred as Abdolhamid Rigi the elder brother of the detained leader of Jundallah, Abdolmalek Rigi in Narges Abyar's acclaimed When the Moon Was Full, the film screened for the first time at the 37th Fajr Film Festival.

Shakiba received critical acclaimed and was highly praised by both audience and critics. he earned various accolades including Crystal Simorgh for Best Actor and Hafez Award for Best Actor, in addition to nominations for an Iran's Film Critics and Writers Association award and an Iran Cinema Celebration award. Shakiba and his co-star Shakerdoost both won Crystal Simorgh for their performances making them the second couple to do so. (Hedieh Tehrani and Mohammad Reza Foroutan were the first ones.)

The film also won the Crystal Simorgh for Best Film and Best Director and received critical acclaim and was a commercial success.

he played in the play Oslo (2019) directed by Yousef Bapiri on Iranshahr Theater stage.

The third season of Bachelors aird under the name of Masters from 8 November to 7 December for 28 episodes and became one of the most watched series of the year.

=== 2020–2021: Crystal Simorgh snub ===
After his critically acclaimed role in When the Moon Was Full, Shakiba starred in Soheil Beiraghi's Pulp (2020) as Milad Bodaghi, an LGBT-related character who became friends with an old lady (played by Fatemeh Motamed Arya). The film screened for the first time at the 38th Fajr Film Festival.

In February 2020, He played in Atila Pesyani's play Qajari's Coffee alongside Navid Mohammadzadeh.

At the 39th Fajr Film Festival Shakiba participated with two films TiTi and Pinto, both alongside Elnaz Shakerdoost.

He played as Amir Sasan, an alcoholic wedding singer who is abusive to his wife in Ida Panahandeh's TiTi (2021).

Shakiba collaborated with Narges Abyar for the second time in Pinto (2021), where he plays a gambler who is a (wife) beater with a short temper. the acting was praised by the critics but on 10 February when the nominees were announced, Shakiba wasn't nominated. this was one of the biggest snubs of the festival.

Shakerdoost shared a post on her Instagram account and expressed her feelings about the snubs: "Due to not seeing your name, I haven't been able to be happy even for a second about my candidacy, because I don't know the result of the audience's belief in my role apart from my co-star." "..I have always been silent, but this time, knowledge did not allow me not to testify to your unceasing efforts, to your powerful acting and to your patience, I am grateful to you."

Pinto won the Crystal Simorgh for Audience Choice of Best Film.

Shakiba later earned an Iran's Film Critics and Writers Association award nomination for Best Supporting Actor for his performance in Pinto.

He played in Bonus (2021) short film directed by Reza Nejati which received critical acclaim and won the Crystal Simorgh for Best Short Film at the 40th Fajr Film Festival. Shakiba earned an Iranian Short Film Association nomination for Best Performance for his role in Bonus as a Teacher.

=== 2022: Party and Conjugal Visit ===
On 31 July 2021, it was announced that Shakiba will star in Omid Shams feature debut romance drama Conjugal Visit (2022) alongside Parinaz Izadyar. The film was screened for the first time at the Main Competition of 40th Fajr Film Festival.

One day before the closing ceremony and award presentation, the Fajr Film Festival announced that they would not give the Crystal Simorgh for Audience Choice of Best Film this year.

By that time, the analysis of the sales of 22 films in the competition section of the 40th Fajr Film Festival showed that Conjugal Visit was the best-selling film of the festival with 818 million tomans, and in a shoulder-to-shoulder competition with 4 million tomans more than Mohammad Hossein Mahdavian's The Loser Man (2022).

Conjugal Visit had the first place in the voting section on the last ten days of the festival. On 10 February 2022, when The nominees for the 40th Fajr Film Festival were announced at a press conference, everyone was shocked that the film had only two nominations for Best Supporting Actor and Best First Film. this was the biggest snub of the festival.

The film was named by Film Emrooz the second-best film of the festival, It was also named the best film of the festival by Cinematicket and Salamcinema users.

The acting and direction were highly praised by the critics. at the eighth Urban International Film Festival, Shakiba was nominated for the Best Actor Award. at the festival, the film won the award for Best Film, shared with Majid Majidi's critically acclaimed Sun Children.

He played Farhad, an English Teacher who is in prison for some reason and has fallen in love with his inmate's daughter Parvaneh.

On 10 March, it was announced that he will be doing the voice acting of two characters in Iraj Tahmasb's talk show Party (2022). The first episode was released on 22 March.

Among the two characters (Shabash and Bacheh), Bacheh became popular among the people. Most of the time, Bacheh is seen in a state of anger and fights and argues with people over various issues. Because of his job (flower seller), he is very sensitive to his flowers and gets angry if someone is careless about his flowers or talks to him in a bad tone. He uses rude and nasty words during fights and anger, and according to himself, he enjoys this work. The child has a foul-mouthed and obscene personality. However, the child has a sheltered and kind personality so if he feels intimacy and friendship with someone, he will talk to him in a calm and pleading tone. His famous phrase "not your business honey" became very popular in Iran.

=== 2023: Upcoming projects ===
On 17 February 2023, the first episode of Shahram Shah Hosseini's romance web series Set Me Free was released on Filimo, starring Shakiba as Hatef alongside Mohsen Tanabandeh.

Some reliable sources have stated that Shakiba will be starring in Narges Abyar's period drama web series Savushun, and Soroush Sehat's comedy web series How Many Springs Does Life Have.

== Filmography ==
=== Film ===
Year	Title	Role	Director	Notes
2013	Transaction Completed Successfully		Majid Tavakoli	Short film; released in 2024
2014	Voice of Silence	Seyyed Hassan	Mohammad Hadi Naiji	
2014	Sensitive Floor	Hassan	Kamal Tabrizi	
2014	The Very Uncrowded Street		Saeed Roustaee	Short film
2015	Night, Outdoor	Tomaj	Kaveh Sajjadi Hosseini	
2016	Don't Prevent the Door from Closing		Yasamin Rizan	Short film
2016	Helen	Ashkan	Ali Akbar Saghafi	
2018	Turn Me On		Sam Ghazi	Short film
2019	When the Moon Was Full	Abdolhamid Rigi	Narges Abyar	
2020	Unpopular	Milad Bodaghi	Soheil Beiraghi	
2020	TiTi	Amir Sasan	Ida Panahandeh	
2021	Pinto	Ali	Narges Abyar	
2021	Bonus	Teacher	Reza Nejati	Short film
2022	Conjugal Visit	Farhad	Omid Shams	
2024	Breakfast with Giraffes	Pouya	Soroush Sehhat	
2024	Seventy Thirty	Parviz	Bahram Afshari	
TBA	48FM Radio	Sami	Kiarash Asadizadeh	Completed in 2018

=== Web ===
Year	Title	Role	Director	Platform	Notes	Ref(s)
2014–2015	Fool	Mehrdad	Kamal Tabrizi	Filimo	Main role; 14 episodes	
2021	Mutual Friendship	Himself	Shahab Hosseini	Namava	Guest appearance; 1 episode	
2022–2023	Party	Shabash, Bacheh (voice)	Iraj Tahmasb	Filimo, Namava	Main role; 30 episodes	
2023	Set Me Free	Hatef Nayeb Sorkhi	Shahram Shah Hosseini	Filimo	Main role; 17 episodes	
2023	You Only Go Around Once	Habib Naghavi	Soroush Sehhat	Filimo, Namava	Cameo; 1 episode	
2025	Tasian	Amir Yousefinia	Tina Pakravan	Filimo	Main role	
2025	Savushun	Malek Sohrab	Narges Abyar	Namava	Supporting role	

=== Television ===
Year	Title	Role	Director	Network	Notes
2009	Will Happen	Behnam's friend	Behrouz Shoeibi	IRIB TV3	Television film
2011	Salt Pan		Ali Khazaeifar	IRIB Razavi Khorasan Province	Television film
2014, 2015, 2018	Red Hat	Dibi & Khooneh Baghali (voice)	Iraj Tahmasb	IRIB TV2	Main role
2016–2019	Bachelors	Habib Naghavi	Soroush Sehat	IRIB TV3	Leading role; 97 episodes
2024	Party	Shabash / Bacheh / Dibi / Khooneh Baghali (voice)	Iraj Tahmasb	IRIB Nasim	Main role

== Theatre ==
Year	Title	Playwright	Director	Stage	Ref(s)
2017–2018	Oliver Twist	Charles Dickens	Hossein Parsaee	Vahdat Hall	
2017–2019	100%	Marcus Lloyd	Morteza Esmail Kashi	Iranshahr Theater, Shahrzad Theater Complex	
2018–2019	Les Misérables	Victor Hugo	Hossein Parsaee	Tehran Royal Hall	
2019	Oslo	J. T. Rogers	Yousef Bapiri	Iranshahr Theater	
2020	Qajari's Coffee	Atila Pesyani (Inspired by Hamlet)	Atila Pesyani	City Theater of Tehran	

== Awards and nominations ==
Award	Year	Category	Nominated Work	Result
Fajr Film Festival	2019	Best Actor in a Leading Role	When the Moon Was Full	Won
Fajr Theater Festival	2018	Best Actor	Oliver Twist	Nominated
Fajr Theater Festival	2018	Best Actor	100%	Honorary Diploma
Hafez Awards	2017	Best Actor – Television Series Comedy	Bachelors	Won
Hafez Awards	2018	Best Actor – Television Series Comedy	Bachelors	Nominated
Hafez Awards	2020	Best Actor – Motion Picture	When the Moon Was Full	Won
Hafez Awards	2022	Best Actor – Theatre	Les Misérables	Nominated
Hafez Awards	2023	Best Actor – Motion Picture	Conjugal Visit	Nominated
International Children and Youth Theater Festival	2013	First Place Acting Prize	Mad Toy	Won
Iran Cinema Celebration	2019	Best Actor in a Leading Role	When the Moon Was Full	Nominated
Iran's Film Critics and Writers Association	2020	Best Actor in a Leading Role	When the Moon Was Full	Nominated
Iran's Film Critics and Writers Association	2022	Best Actor in a Supporting Role	Pinto	Nominated
Iran International University Theater Festival	2009	First Place Acting Prize	Tune Your Violins	Won
Iran International University Theater Festival	2010	Acting Prize	Marat/Sade	Honorary Diploma
Iranian Short Film Association	2022	Best Performance	Bonus	Nominated
Jam-e-Jam Television Festival	2018	Best Actor	Bachelors	Nominated
Theater Actor Celebration	2014	Best Theater Actor of the Year	Timequake	Won
Theater Actor Celebration	2016	Best Theater Actor of the Year	The Hole	Nominated
Theater Actor Celebration	2018	Special Acting Prize	Oliver Twist	Won
Urban International Film Festival	2022	Best Actor	Conjugal Visit	Nominated
