= The Owners =

The Owners may refer to:

- The Owners (2014 film), a comedy-drama film directed by Adilkhan Yerzhanov
- The Owners (2020 film), a thriller film directed by Julius Berg
