= Mutual Friendship =

Iranian talk show

- Hamrefigh logo
- Genre: Talk show
- Written by: Soroush Sehhat
- Directed by: Shahab Hosseini
- Presented by: Shahab Hosseini
- Opening theme: Bomrani
- Ending theme: Bomrani
- Country of origin: Iran
- Original language: Persian
- No. of seasons: 1
- No. of episodes: 30

Production
- Producer: Hassan Khodadadi
- Production location: Tehran
- Running time: About 90 minutes

Original release
- Network: Namava
- Release: 10 December 2020

Mutual Friendship (Persian: هم‌رفیق "Hamrafigh") is a series of Home video performed and directed by Shahab Hosseini, which started broadcasting on December 10, 2020, produced by Hassan Khodadadi. In each episode of the program, the invited guest can introduce a person as a friend to be present in the program.

== Program structure ==
The main focus of the program is to rely on the topic of camaraderie and friendship, most of the discussions between the host and the guests are related to this issue; That is why the guest of the program also invites his best friend to be added to it from the middle of the program and the conversation continues in threes.

The main guest brings a gift or souvenir to give to his / her best friend who is there during the performance and surprises him / her. Also, the sponsor of the program (Persian Easy Payment Company) will give gifts to both guests and one of the viewers of the program, and in addition to all this, at the end of the program, there is a statue for each other, which is a handshake, along with rings that say "Ya Refigh". It is presented to the guests by Shahab Hosseini.

=== Hamrefigh-e Man campaign ===
This program has developed a campaign that is identified with the hashtag #همرفیق_من; The purpose of this campaign is to produce content and videos on the subject of friendship, addressing a friend or recording them with a friend, which in each part of the program, a number of selected clips of this campaign are displayed.

Selecting selected videos as well as announcing your readiness to participate in the program as a viewer is possible only through the "AP" application (related to Easy Payment Company).

=== Live music ===
The Bomrani music group is present in a corner of the studio at all minutes of the program, and in addition to the beginning and end of the program, they perform live music at special moments, such as the arrival of the main guest or his best friend.

In the second episode of the program, which was attended by Hootan Shakiba, he joined the members of Bomrani due to his old friendship and the history of performing with them, and they sang a track that they had performed before.

In addition to the Bomrani group, which performs verbal music, in each episode of the program, a musician is invited to play the favorite instrument of the guest for a few minutes, and this part is in the form of non-verbal music. Although it is forbidden to show musical instruments on Islamic Republic of Iran Broadcasting, but in this part of the program, instruments such as Divan, Kamancheh and… Are used.

In the fifth episode, in addition to Ahmad Mehranfar playing the dozaleh for a few minutes, at the request of Shahab Hosseini, the voice of this traditional instrument was combined with the rhythm of modern instruments of the Bomrani group, and the two danced Kurdish on stage with Mohsen Tanabandeh.

== Margins ==
=== Obtaining a license ===
First, in August 2020, it was announced that the Hamrefigh program would be produced and broadcast with the permission of the country's cinema organization (under the Ministry of Culture and Islamic Guidance) But after a while, Satra (the organization for regulating the audio-visual media in cyberspace), which is a subset of the Islamic Republic of Iran Broadcasting, issued a statement stating that such programs require a license from this institution, and the license that this program received from the cinema organization was considered invalid. Following this, Seyyed Mohammad Mehdi Tabatabai-Nejad, then Deputy Director of Evaluation and Supervision of the Cinema Organization, reacted to Satra's announcement on behalf of this organization and emphasized that the licensing of this program was within the authority of the Cinema Organization. Then the agents of the Hamrefigh Program also applied for permission from the Satra organization The public relations of this organization announced on September 30, 2020 that Hamrefigh (for broadcasting in Namava) along with Dirin Dirin and Vaskhandish programs have received broadcasting licenses. This time it was the turn of the cinema organization, which protested against this issue, considering the request of comrades from Satra as a sign that the permission of the Ministry of Guidance was not taken seriously and in fact it was a kind of disrespect. Finally, in response to these comments, the public relations of the Hamrefigh program announced that the program had been licensed by the Cinema Organization to "make" and to "broadcast" by the Satra Organization, in accordance with the law.

=== Guest financial request ===
Before the airing of the first episode, it was rumored that Navid Mohammadzadeh, the first guest of the program, had requested 500 million Tomans to attend it, and this news was even covered in news agencies such as Mehr But none of the agents of the program or Mohammadzadeh himself reacted to this rumor.

=== Criticism of rap music audiences ===
In the seventh episode of the program, which was broadcast on January 21, 2021, Mehran Ahmadi, who was present as a guest on the program, in a part of his speech in order to point out the difference between the generations, says in a mocking manner: "When was rap our problem? What exactly is rap? It is Paste Dad!", Shahab Hosseini continues:"Do not touch my heart. My son raped. It has ruined my reputation". The broadcast of this part of the program caused a wide range of audiences and fans of Persian rap to react to it and to attack the pages of these two actors in cyberspace; Among activists in the field, rappers such as Sina Saei and Khashayar SR reacted And even following Bahram Nouraei's protest tweet The hashtag #این_دهن_بسته_بمونه_بهتره (It is better to keep this mouth shut) on Twitter was launched in protest of the opponents of this style of music.

== Guest list ==
Row	Broadcast date	Main guest		Friend		Guest gifts to his / her friend
Row	Broadcast date	Name	Picture	Name	Picture	Guest gifts to his / her friend
1	10 December 2020	Navid Mohammadzadeh (Actor)		Vahid Jalilvand (Director)		The coat that Mohammadzadeh wore when he received the Venice Award
2	17 December 2020	Hootan Shakiba (Actor)		Bahram Afshari (Actor)		A painting by Mehdi Zia al-Dini (Uncle of Hootan Shakiba)
3	24 December 2020	Pejman Jamshidi (Footballer and actor)		Sam Derakhshani (Actor)		Several volumes of books
4	31 December 2020	Fatemeh Motamed-Arya (Actress)		Marzieh Boroumand (Director and actress)		An old souvenir photo of Marzieh Boroumand attending the wedding of Fatemeh Motamed-Arya
5	7 January 2021	Mohsen Tanabandeh (Actor)		Ahmad Mehranfar (Actor)		Children's shoes for Ahmad Mehranfar's son
6	14 January 2021	Hadi Hejazifar (Actor)		Mohammad Hossein Mahdavian (Director)		A few CDs of music from the regions of Iran
7	21 January 2021	Mehran Ahmadi (Actor)		Borzoo Niknejad (Director)		A number of men's watches
8	28 January 2021	Shabnam Moghaddami (Actress)		Maryam Shirazi (Actress)		A pot of ferns
9	4 February 2021	Nima Raisi (Voice actor)		Mohammad Reza Alimardani (Voice actor)		A globe
10	11 February 2021	Reza Sadeghi (Singer)		Ali Ansarian (Football player and Actor)		A French press
11	18 February 2021	Khodadad Azizi (Football player)		Reza Shahroudi (Football player)		A number 16 shirt of Persepolis
12	25 February 2021	Javad Ezzati (Actor)		Soroush Sehhat (Actor and Director)		A cast iron teapot
13	4 March 2021	Peyman GhasemKhani (Screenwriter)		Mehrab GhasemKhani (Screenwriter)		Bill the Butcher's Action figure
14	11 March 2021	Sara Bahrami (Actress)		Pardis Ahmadieh (Actress)		A recorder
