= The Warden (film) =

- Film poster
- Persian: Persian: سرخ‌پوست
- Directed by: Nima Javidi
- Written by: Nima Javidi
- Produced by: Majid Motalebi
- Starring: Navid Mohammadzadeh; Parinaz Izadyar; Atila Pesyani; Setareh Pesyani
- Cinematography: Hooman Bahmanesh
- Edited by: Imad Khodabakhesh
- Music by: Ramin Kousha
- Production company: Iranian Independents
- Distributed by: FilmIran
- Release date: February 1, 2019 (FIFF)
- Running time: 80 minutes
- Country: Iran
- Language: Persian

The Warden (Persian: سرخ‌پوست, romanized: Sorkhpust) is a 2019 Iranian mystery drama film directed and written by Nima Javidi. It stars Navid Mohammadzadeh and Parinaz Izadyar. Set in 1967 in Iran, Mohammadzadeh plays Major Nemat Jahed, the warden of a prison, who is being evacuated for expansion whilst one of the prisoners is missing.

This film was screened for the first time in the 37th Fajr Film Festival, and by being nominated in 8 categories of this festival, Crystal Simorgh has been awarded a special prize by the jury. Massoud Farasati in his television show Seven considered this film as the best work of the festival.

== Plot ==
In 1967, an old prison in the south is to be evacuated due to its proximity to the city's developing airport. Major Nemat Jahed, the prison warden, has the inmates transferred to another facility while the major himself and his men are scheduled to leave the prison by evening. Colonel Modaber, who is superior to Jahed, visits him in prison and announces that Jahed has been promoted and is going to be his own successor. Jahed, happy to hear the news, receives a phone call informing him that one of the prisoners, Ahmed, nicknamed the Indian, was not with the other prisoners. Subsequent investigations assure Jahed that Ahmed is still in prison and hiding somewhere. At the same time Susan Karimi, who works for the social service assisting the prisoners, comes to see Jahed and tells him that Ahmed's sentence has been changed suspiciously from imprisonment to death. Jahed, who sees his promotion in jeopardy, searches the entire prison with his troops to find the prisoner. In addition he is falling in love with Susan but feels pressured by everyone: the workers, already there to demolish the prison, Ahmed's wife, who wants her husband to live, Susan, who believes in Ahmed's innocence and has clearly tried to help him, and himself, knowing that an escape in his prison would ruin his life, something he is determined to avoid by doing everything in his power to make Ahmed reappear.

== Cast ==
- Navid Mohammadzadeh as Major Nemat Jahed
- Ramin Mashare as Rahmaan
- Parinaz Izadyar as Sousan Karimi
- Atila Pesyani as Airport manager
- Setareh Pesyani as Ahmad's wife
- Amir Keyvan Masoumi as Sergeant Abbas Naji
- Habib Razaei as Prisoner
- Mani Haghighi Colonel Modabber
- Ismaeel Pourreza as Seyyed Davod
- Mohammad Rasoul Safati as Captain Raouf
- Yadollah Shademani as the witness
- Ali Merdaneh as Sergeant Assadi
- Morteza Ali Abbas Mirzaei as Prisoner
- Hojjat Hassanpour as Saeed
- Hossein Rahmani Manesh as Son of Nemat Jahed

== Soundtrack ==
The Warden (Original Motion Picture Soundtrack)

Soundtrack album by Ramin Kousha
- Released: July 5, 2019
- Studio: Capitol
- Genre: Soundtrack
- Label: Plaza Mayor Company, Ltd.

The film's score is composed by Ramin Kousha, who is also the pianist. It was released on July 5, 2019.

1. Last Day in Jail
2. Countdown
3. Time to Leave This Place
4. Ultimatum
5. Pieces from the Whole
6. Looking Everywhere for Him
7. Gas Attack
8. Aftermath
9. Losing Consciousness
10. Dead End
11. We Know Everything Now
12. Suspicion
13. Light & Darkness
14. Circles
15. One More Time
16. Free Him

== Release ==
The Warden was screened for the first time, on Friday, February 1, 2019, in the Simorgh Soda section of the 37th Fajr International Film Festival, and was released in cinemas across the country on June 5, 2019. The Warden is now the fourth best-selling non-comedy film in the history of Iranian cinema.

== Screens, Attending festivals and Awards ==
=== Screenings and festivals ===
==== Internal ====
Year	Event	Part	Release date
2019	Fajr International Film Festival	Simorgh soda	1 February 2019
2019	The Association of Film Critics and Writers Festival	Feature films	-
2019	21st Iranian Cinema Festival	Statue of Merit	30 August 2019

=== Awards ===
37th Fajr Film Festival
Year	Category	Recipient	Result
2019	Best Film	Majid Motalebi	Nominated
2019	Best Director	Nima Javidi	Nominated
2019	Audience Choice of Best Film	Majid Motalebi	2nd
2019	Best Actor	Navid Mohammadzadeh	Nominated
2019	Best Screenplay	Nima Javidi	Nominated
2019	Best Visual Effects	Javad Matouri	Nominated
2019	Best Production Design	Mohsen Nasrollahi	Nominated
2019	Special Jury Prize	Nima Javidi	Won

=== Other awards ===
21st Iranian Cinema Festival
Part	Nominee	Result	Award
The best movie	Majid Motalebi	Won	Statue of Merit
Best Director	Nima Javidi	Nominated	Statue of Merit
Best Actor in a Leading Role	Navid Mohammadzadeh	Won	Statue of Merit
Best Supporting Actress	Setareh Pesyani	Nominated	Statue of Merit
The best screenplay	Nima Javidi	Nominated	Statue of Merit
The best filming	Hooman Behmanesh	Won	Statue of Merit
The best editing	Emad Khodabakhsh and Hoda Mobini	Nominated	Statue of Merit
The best face painting	Iman Omidvari	Nominated	Statue of Merit
The best visual special effects	Javad Matouri	Won	Statue of Merit

20th Hafez Festival
Part	Nominee	Result
The best movie	Majid Motalebi	Won
Best Director	Nima Javidi	Won
Best Cinema Actor	Navid Mohammadzadeh	Won
Best Cinema Actress	Parinaz Izadyar	Won
The best editing	Emad Khodabakhsh	Nominated
The best soundtrack	Ramin Koosha	Nominated
The best cinematographer	Hooman Behmanesh	Nominated
The best movie script	Nima Javidi	Nominated

=== International nominations ===
Year	Award	Category	Recipient	Result
2019	International Crime and Punishment Film Festival	International Golden Scale Award	Nima Javidi	Nominated
2019	São Paulo International Film Festival	New Directors Competition	Nima Javidi	Nominated
