= 8th Asia Pacific Screen Awards =

- Date: 14 December 2014
- Site: Brisbane; Australia

Highlights
- Best Film: Leviathan
- Best Actor: Cliff Curtis
- Best Actress: Lü Zhong

The 8th Asia Pacific Screen Awards were held in Brisbane, Australia on 11 December 2014.

== Awards ==
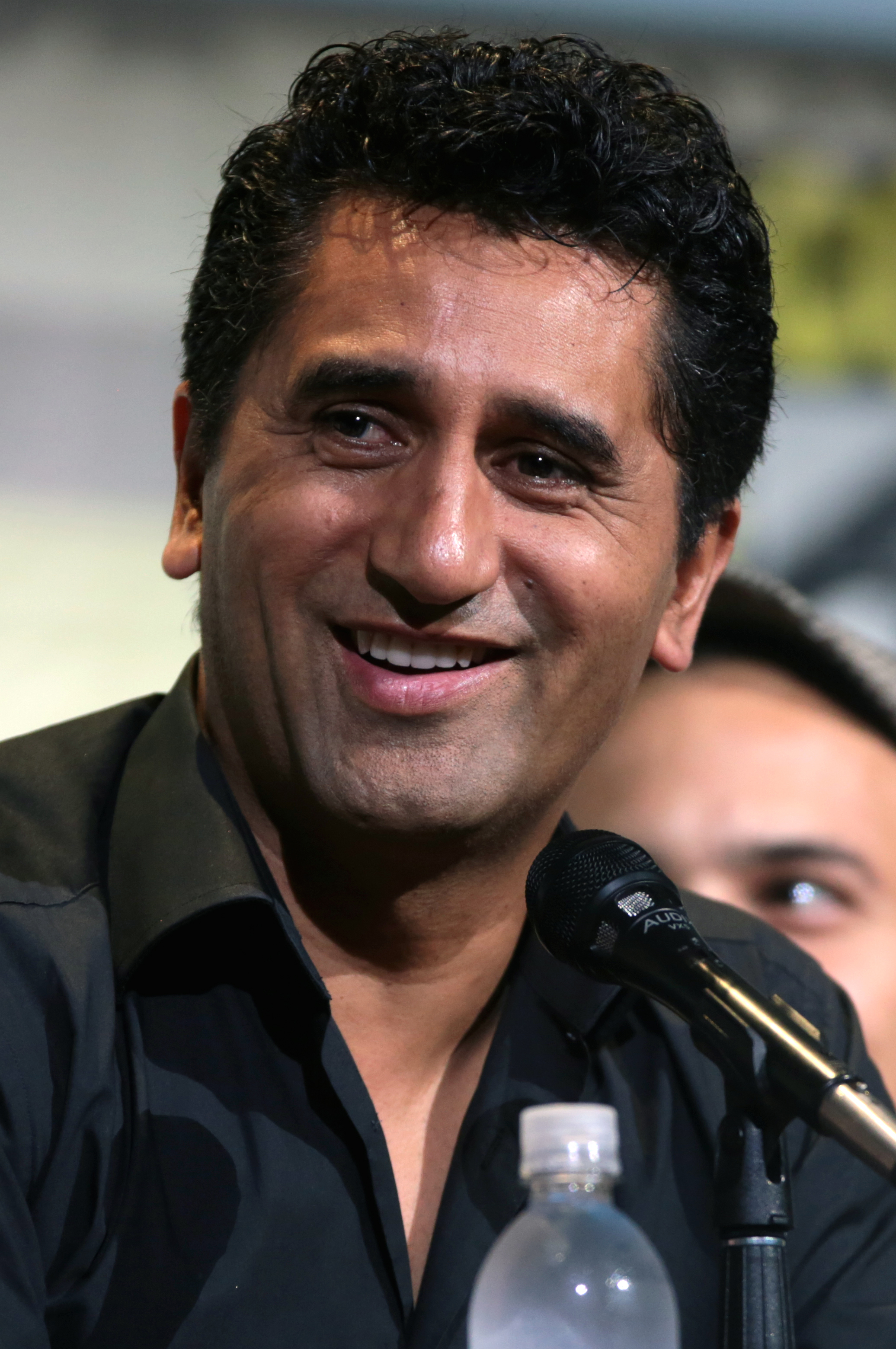
Cliff Curtis, Best Actor winner.

Best Feature Film	Achievement in Directing
(Russia) Leviathan: (Iran) I'm Not Angry!; (Iraq) Memories on Stone; (Kazakhstan) The Owners; (Turkey) Winter Sleep	(Turkey) Nuri Bilge Ceylan - Winter Sleep: (Australia) Rolf de Heer - Charlie's Country; (Russia) Andrey Zvyagintsev - Leviathan; (South Korea) Im Kwon-taek - Revivre; (Iran) Rakhshan Bani-E'temad - Tales
Best Actor	Best Actress
(New Zealand) Cliff Curtis - The Dark Horse: (China) Liao Fan - Black Coal, Thin Ice; (Sri Lanka) Mahendra Perera - 28; (Australia) David Gulpilil - Charlie's Country; (Iran) Navid Mohammadzadeh - I'm Not Angry!	(China) Lü Zhong - Red Amnesia: (Israel) Ronit Elkabetz - Gett: The Trial of Viviane Amsalem; (Philippines) Nora Aunor - Hustisya; (China) Tang Wei - The Golden Era
Best Screenplay	Best Cinematography
(Iran) Nima Javidi - Melbourne: (Sri Lanka) Prasanna Jayakody - 28; (Russia) Aleksey Fedorchenko, Denis Osokin, Oleg Loevskiy - Angels of Revolution; (Philippines) Giancarlo Abrahan - Sparks	(China) Dong Jinsong - Black Coal, Thin Ice: (China) Zeng Jian - Blind Massage; (Russia) Mikhail Krichman - Leviathan; (Russia) Levan Kapanadze - Test; (Kazakhstan) Yerkinbek Ptyraliyev - The Owners
Best Animated Feature Film	Best Documentary Feature Film
(Japan) The Tale of the Princess Kaguya: (China) The Frog Kingdom; (Australia) Maya the Bee; (South Korea) On the White Planet	(Iraq) 1001 Apples: (India) Bidesia in Bambai; (South Korea) Sanda: Surviving; Silvered Water, Syria Self-Portrait; (Singapore) Wukan: The Flame of Democracy
Best Youth Feature Film	UNESCO Award
(Turkey) Sivas: (Australia) 52 Tuesdays; (Russia) Corrections Class; (India) Killa; (Jordan) Theeb	(Iraq) Memories on Stone
FIAPF Award	Jury Grand Prize
(Australia) Emile Sherman	(China) Blind Massage

=== Films and countries with multiple nominations ===
Films that received multiple nominations
Nominations	Film
3	Leviathan
2	28
2	Blind Massage
2	Charlie's Country
2	I'm Not Angry!
2	Memories on Stone
2	The Owners
2	Winter Sleep

Countries that received multiple nominations
Awards	Country
7	China
5	Australia
5	Russia
4	Iran
3	South Korea
3	Turkey
2	India
2	Iraq
2	Kazakhstan
2	Philippines
2	Sri Lanka
