= Ahmad Mehranfar =

Iranian film and stage actor (born 1975)

- احمد مهران‌فر
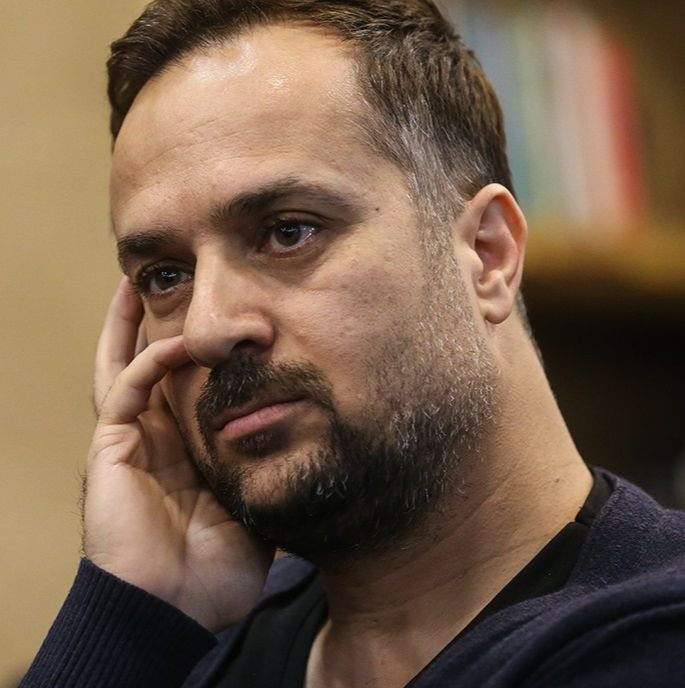
- Mehranfar at the press conference of Capital (2018)
- Born: May 31, 1975 (age 51); Kashan, Iran
- Education: University of Tehran
- Occupations: Actor; screenwriter
- Years active: 1992–present
- Spouse: Mona Faezpour (m. 2018)
- Children: 1

Ahmad Mehranfar (Persian: احمد مهران‌فر, born May 31, 1975) is an Iranian actor. He is best known for his role as Arastou Amel in Capital (2011–2025).

== Filmography ==
=== Film ===
Year	Title	Role	Director
2002	Bread, Love, Motorcycle 1000	The Suitor	Abolhassan Davoodi
2003	Movie Mania		Ebrahim Vahidzadeh
2005	Poet of the Wastes		Mohammad Ahmadi
2006	Cease Fire	Darab	Tahmineh Milani
2006	The Sun Shines on All Equally	Reza	Abbas Rafei
2007	Eghlima		Mohammad Mehdi Asgarpour
2007	Pay Back	Kamran Saeedi	Tahmineh Milani
2008	Lost Truth		Mohammad Ahmadi
2008	A Petition for God		Alireza Amini
2009	Cottage	Hamed	Javad Afshar
2009	The Evening of The 10th Day		Mojtaba Raie
2009	About Elly	Manouchehr	Asghar Farhadi
2010	Nothing	Adel	Abdolreza Kahani
2011	Absolutely Tame Is a Horse	Taxi Driver	Abdolreza Kahani
2011	The Meeting		Abbas Rafei
2012	A Simple Love Story	Keramat	Saman Moghadam
2012	Needlessly and Causelessly	Farhad	Abdolreza Kahani
2012	The Mirror Candlestick		Bahram Bahramian
2013	A Romance for a Conscript, Rahmat	Rahmat	Pouria Azarbayjani
2013	Trapped	Hamid	Parviz Shahbazi
2015	Iran Burger	Roham	Masoud Jafari Jozani
2016	Spare	Akbar	Borzou Niknejad
2016	7 Months Pregnant	Amirhossein	Hatef Alimardani
2017	Walking on String	Davood	Ahmad Reza Motamedi
2017	Midday Adventures	Rahim	Mohammad Hossein Mahdavian
2018	Katyusha	Arshia	Ali Atshani
2018	Don't Be Embarrassed	Ghanbar	Reza Maghsoodi
2021	Dynamite	Mohammad Hossein	Masoud Atyabi
2022	2888		Keyvan Alimohammadi, Ali Akbar Heydari
2022	Solitary	Bahram	Masoud Atyabi
2023	Duet Song	Pasha	Arezoo Arzanesh
2024	Don't Be Embarrassed 2	Ghanbar	Reza Maghsoudi
2025	Molotov Cocktail		Hossein Amiri Domari

=== Web ===
Year	Title	Role	Director	Platform
2013–2014	King of Ear	Solat Khanjari	Davood Mir Bagheri	Video CD
2014–2015	Fool	Asad Ali	Kamal Tabrizi	Video CD
2019	The Years Away from Home	Solar / Shahram Khanjari	Majid Salehi	Filimo, Namava
2021	Mutual Friendship	Himself	Shahab Hosseini	Namava
2022	The Sorcerer	Ghodrat / Mandal Khan	Masoud Atyabi	Filimo, Namava
2023	Actor	Morteza	Nima Javidi	Filimo, Namava

=== Television ===
Year	Title	Role	Director	Notes	Network
2003	The Bank People		Mehdi Mazloumi	TV series	IRIB TV2
2004	The Rule of Love		Saeed Soltani	TV series	IRIB TV5
2007	Family Tet		Maedeh Tahmasebi	TV theater	IRIB TV4
2007	Zero Degree Turn		Hassan Fathi	TV series	IRIB TV1
2008	Virtual Reality		Reza Beheshti	TV film	IRIB TV1
2011–present	Capital	Arastou Amel	Siroos Moghaddam	TV series	IRIB TV1
2017	Alalbadal	Alalbadal	Siroos Moghaddam	TV series	IRIB TV1

== Awards and nominations ==
Award	Year	Category	Nominated Work	Result	Ref.
Fajr Film Festival	2012	Best Actor in a Supporting Role	A Simple Love Story	Nominated	
Hafez Awards	2014	Best Actor – Television Series Comedy	Capital 2	Nominated	
Hafez Awards	2015	Best Actor – Television Series Comedy	Capital 3	Nominated	
Hafez Awards	2016	Best Actor – Television Series Comedy	Capital 4	Won	
Hafez Awards	2017	Best Actor – Motion Picture	Midday Adventures	Nominated	
Hafez Awards	2018	Best Actor – Television Series Comedy	Capital 5	Nominated	
Hafez Awards	2023	Best Actor – Television Series Drama	Actor	Nominated	
Iran Cinema Celebration	2017	Best Actor in a Supporting Role	Midday Adventures	Nominated	
Iran's Film Critics and Writers Association	2013	Best Actor in a Supporting Role	Needlessly and Causelessly	Nominated	
Iran's Film Critics and Writers Association	2017	Best Actor in a Supporting Role	Midday Adventures	Nominated	
