= Shirin Yazdanbakhsh =

Iranian actress (1949–2025)

- شیرین یزدان‌بخش
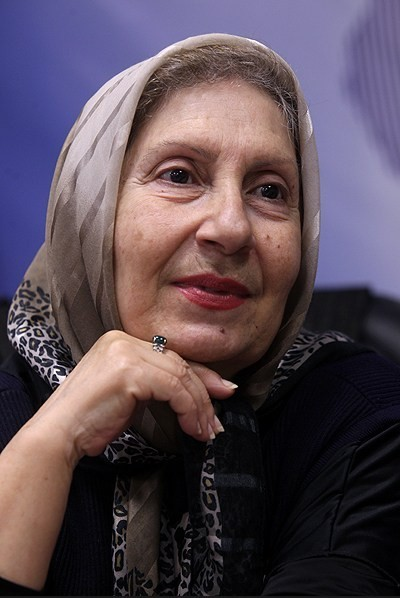
- Yazdanbakhsh in 2016
- Born: 9 January 1949; Isfahan, Pahlavi Iran
- Died: 25 December 2025 (aged 76)
- Occupation: Actress
- Years active: 2010–2025
- Height: 1.63 m (5 ft 4 in)

Shirin Yazdanbakhsh (Persian: شیرین یزدان‌بخش; 9 January 1949 – 25 December 2025) was an Iranian actress. She won the Crystal Simorgh Award for the Best supporting actress at the 28th Fajr International Film Festival for her role in Please Do Not Disturb (2010). She was also nominated for the Crystal Simorgh Award for Best supporting actress at the 34th Fajr International Film Festival, for her role in Life and a Day (2016).

Yazdanbakhsh died from complications of a stroke on 25 December 2025, at the age of 76.

== Filmography ==
- Killer Spider (2020)
- Gholamreza Takhti (2019)
- Los Angeles Tehran (2017–2018)
- Boarding Pass (2017)
- Sara and Ayda (2017)
- Abji (2017)
- Yek rouz bekhosos (2017)
- Aaaadat Nemikonim (2016)
- Life and a Day (Abad va yek rooz) (2016)
- Inversion (2016)
- Avalanche (2015)
- Closer (2015)
- Melbourne (2014)
- Barf (2014)
- Esterdad (2013)
- Ashghalhaye Doost Dashtani (2012)
- Kissing the Moon-Like Face (2012)
- A Separation (2011)
- The Snow on the Pines (2010)
- Please Do Not Disturb (2010)

== Awards and honors ==
| Year | Work | Award | Category | Result | Ref. |
|---|---|---|---|---|---|
| 2019 | Ashghalhaye Doost Dashtani | 21st Iran Cinema Celebration | Best Actress | Nominated | |
| 2016 | Life and a Day | 34th Fajr International Film Festival | Best supporting actress | Nominated | |
| 2012 | Kissing the Moon-Like Face | 30th Fajr International Film Festival | Best Actress | Nominated | |
| 2012 | Kissing the Moon-Like Face | Eastern Vista Awards - Cinema Asia | Diploma Honoring the best actress | Honorary Diploma | |
| 2010 | Please Do Not Disturb | 28th Fajr International Film Festival | Best supporting actress | Won | |
