= A Dragon Arrives! =

2016 film directed by Mani Haghighi

- Film poster
- Directed by: Mani Haghighi
- Written by: Mani Haghighi
- Starring: Amir Jadidi
- Release date: 19 February 2016 (Berlin)
- Running time: 107 minutes
- Country: Iran
- Language: Persian

A Dragon Arrives! (Persian: اژدها وارد می‌شود!, romanized: Ejhdeha Vared Mishavad!) is a 2016 Iranian period mystery supernatural thriller film directed by Mani Haghighi. It was selected to compete for the Golden Bear at the 66th Berlin International Film Festival.

== Plot ==
At the beginning of the film, it is said that the film is based on a true story. Interviews with various people, including Mani Haghighi himself, reinforce this assumption, and it is stated that the plot of the film is the story of the sound recording of the film Brick and Mirror made by Mani Haghighi's grandfather, Ebrahim Golestan, and the film says that a film crew is trying to make a feature film with access to this story.

It is February 2, 1964, an orange Chevrolet Impala passes through an ancient cemetery and drives towards a sunken ship.[1] The film is about the death of an exile on the island of Qeshm, who in the film is said to be a Marxist-Leninist. A SAVAK agent goes to Qeshm to investigate the murder and finds out that the exile has been killed. He encounters a strange phenomenon on the island. After each body is buried in an abandoned cemetery, an earthquake occurs. In the film, it is said that a dragon lives under the cemetery (the title of the film was also chosen in this connection). With the help of his two friends, a geologist and a sound engineer, he goes to the island again to discover the secret of this matter. There, other adventures occur that ultimately determine the fate of the three friends in a sinister way.

As the film continues, they find out that a Marxist has had sex with the daughter of a local (Halima) and the girl’s father kills him in revenge and stages the suicide, and Charaki (a SAVAK agent based on Qeshm) also hides this story. A few days later, they find the pregnant Halima in the ship’s morgue and deliver her child; but Halima loses her life and these three friends raise her child. In the end, SAVAK prevents the three friends from continuing their investigation and wants to kill them. They find out and one of them is killed while escaping from SAVAK, one flees Iran and the other is killed in a missile attack.

Regarding the title of the film (in English, A Dragon Arrives), which at least in Persian is the correct title of the Bruce Lee film (in English, Bruce Lee's film is: Enter the Dragon), Haghighi said that there was a lot of discussion among those involved in the film and finally this title was accepted.

== Cast ==
- Amir Jadidi
- Homayoun Ghanizadeh
- Ehsan Goudarzi
- Kiana Tajammol
- Nader Fallah
- Sadegh Zibakalam
- Mani Haghighi
