= Parinaz Izadyar =

Iranian actress (born 1985)

- پریناز ایزدیار
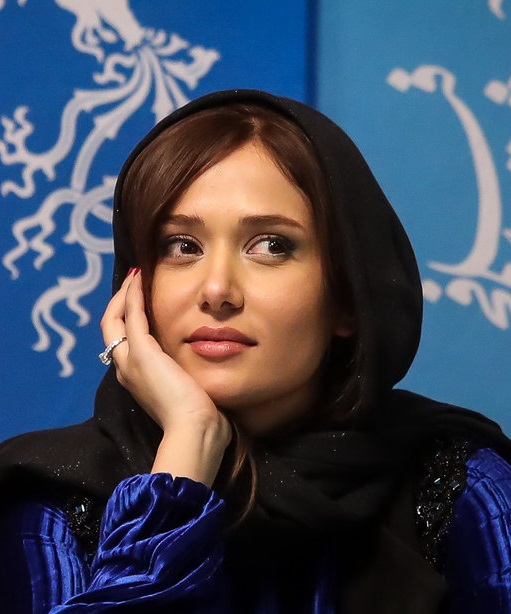
- Izadyar at the 2019 Fajr Film Festival
- Born: August 30, 1985 (age 40); Babol, Iran, Mazandaran, Iran
- Occupation: Actress
- Years active: 2007–present

Parinaz Izadyar (Persian: پریناز ایزدیار; born August 30, 1985) is an Iranian actress. She was born in Babol. She is mostly known for playing dramatic roles, making her one of the most acclaimed actresses of her generation. Izadyar has received various accolades, including a Crystal Simorgh, two Hafez Awards and an Iran's Film Critics and Writers Association Award.

== Career ==
Parinaz Izadyar studied graphic design and made her movie debut in 2007 with One Man, One City, and one year later she appeared in Alireza Amini's The Same Day (2008).

She made her first television appearance in Saeed Ebrahimifar's TV film Moon In the Shadow (2009). Her first series Five Kilometers to Heaven aired on IRIB TV3 in 2011 for which she received acclaim.

Some of Izadyar's other series include Like a Nightmare (2011) and The Times (2012), and Shahrzad (2015–2018). Izadyar has appeared in a number of movies, including Villa Dwellers (2017), Searing Summer (2017), Just 6.5 (2019), and The Warden (2019).

She received the Crystal Simorgh for Best Actress in a Leading Role for her appearance in Life and a Day (2016) at the 34th Fajr Film Festival.

== Filmography ==
=== Film ===
Year	Title	Role	Director	Notes
2007	One Man, One City	Colonel's daughter	Hossein Hedayat	
2010	Along the City	Parinaz	Ali Atshani	
2011	No Men Allowed	Sahar	Rambod Javan	
2013	The Exclusive Line	Marjan	Mostafa Kiaee	
2014	Buried Alive		Ali Jenab	
2014	This Apple Is For You	Shayesteh	Sirus Alvand	
2014	360 Degree	Mahtab	Sam Gharibian	
2016	Life and a Day	Somayyeh	Saeed Roustaee	
2016	A Special Day	Soudabeh	Homayoun As'adian	
2017	Villa Dwellers	Mrs. Kheyri	Monir Gheidi	
2017	Searing Summer	Nasrin	Ebrahim Irajzad	
2018	Hat-trick	Lida	Ramtin Lavafipour	
2018	The Residents of Nowhere		Shahab Hosseini	Released in 2023
2018	Pig	Annie	Mani Haghighi	
2019	Just 6.5	Elham	Saeed Roustaee	
2019	The Warden	Sousan Karimi	Nima Javidi	
2020	Latyan	Salma	Ali Teymoori	
2020	3 Puffs	Nasim	Saman Salur	
2020	Bone Marrow	Bahar Sarikhani	Hamid Reza Ghorbani	
2022	Conjugal Visit	Parvaneh	Omid Shams	
2025	Saddam	Soraya	Pedram Pouramiri	
2025	Woman and Child		Saeed Roustaee	

=== Web ===
Year	Title	Role	Director	Platform	Notes
2015–2018	Shahrzad	Shirin Divansalar	Hassan Fathi	Lotus Play	Main role
2022–2023	Jeyran	Jeyran	Hassan Fathi	Filimo	Main role
2022	Party	Herself	Iraj Tahmasb	Namava	Guest appearance; 1 episode
2025	Azaazil	Shouka Mehrjui	Hassan Fathi	Namava	Main role

=== Television ===
Year	Title	Role	Director	Notes	Network
2009	Moon in the Shadow	Student	Saeed Ebrahimifar	Television film	
2009	The Same Day	Shohreh	Alireza Amini	Television film, supporting role	
2009	Goor Be Goor	Negar	Behrang Tofighi	Television film, leading role	
2010	Tasseography	Targol	Farzad Motamen	Television film	
2011	Like a Nightmare	Negar	Shahram Shah Hosseini	Main role, 20 episodes	IRIB TV1
2011	Five Kilometers to Heaven	Mina	Alireza Afkhami	Main role, 24 episode	IRIB TV3
2012–2013	The Times	Arghavan Azarnia	Hassan Fathi	Main role, 49 episodes	IRIB TV3
2013	Being on Parole	Forough	Masoud Abparvar	Television film, leading role	
2014	Swimming Pool	Mania	Esmaeel Fallah Pour	Television film, leading role	

=== Music video ===
Year	Title	Artist
2017	Havam Dobare Pase	Mohsen Chavoshi

== Theatre ==
Year	Title	Role	Director
2014	A Little Click		Ahmad Soleimani
2018	Les Misérables	Fantine	Hossein Parsaie

== Awards and nominations ==
Name of the award ceremony, year presented, category, nominee of the award, and the result of the nomination
Award	Year	Category	Nominated Work	Result	Ref(s)
Pesaro International Film Festival	2022	Best Actress in a Leading Role	3 Puffs	Won	
Appreciation Award Ceremony of Iranian Cinema Producers	2022	Most Popular Actress	Herself	Won	
Association of Persian Language Critics	2022	Best Actress in a Leading Role	Conjugal Visit	Won	
Dhaka International Film Festival	2017	Best Actress	Searing Summer	Won	
Fajr Film Festival	2016	Best Actress in a Leading Role	Life and a Day	Won	
Fajr Film Festival	2017	Best Actress in a Leading Role	Searing Summer	Nominated	
Fajr Film Festival	2020	Best Actress in a Leading Role	3 Puffs	Nominated	
Hafez Awards	2014	Best Actress – Television Series Drama	The Times	Nominated	
Hafez Awards	2016	Best Actress – Motion Picture	Life and a Day	Won	
Hafez Awards	2016	Best Actress – Television Series Drama	Shahrzad	Nominated	
Hafez Awards	2018	Best Actress – Television Series Drama	Shahrzad	Nominated	
Hafez Awards	2018	Best Actress – Motion Picture	Villa Dwellers	Won	
Hafez Awards	2019	Best Actress – Motion Picture	Just 6.5	Nominated	
Hafez Awards	2020	Best Actress – Motion Picture	The Warden	Nominated	
Hafez Awards	2022	Best Actress – Theatre	Les Misérables	Nominated	
Hafez Awards	2023	Best Actress – Motion Picture	Conjugal Visit	Nominated	
Iran's Film Critics and Writers Association	2016	Best Actress in a Leading Role	Life and a Day	Won	
Urban International Film Festival	2017	Best Actress	Life and a Day	Nominated	
Urban International Film Festival	2019	Best Actress	Searing Summer	Nominated	
Urban International Film Festival	2022	Best Actress	Conjugal Visit	Nominated	
Resistance International Film Festival	2018	Best Actress	Villa Dwellers	Nominated	

== See also ==
- Iranian women
- List of Mazandaranis
- Iranian cinema
- List of famous Persian women
- List of Iranian actresses
