= Actor (TV series) =

Iranian TV series

- Genre: Drama
- Written by: Nima Javidi
- Directed by: Nima Javidi
- Starring: Navid Mohammadzadeh; Ahmad Mehranfar; Hasti Mahdavifar; Hanieh Tavassoli; Gelareh Abbassi; Hooman Barghnavard; Mehraveh Sharifinia
- Composer: Ramin Kousha
- Country of origin: Iran
- Original language: Persian
- No. of episodes: 20

Production
- Producer: Majid Motalebi
- Editor: Emad Khodabakhsh
- Running time: 41–71 minutes
- Production companies: Filimo, Namava

Original release
- Network: Home video network (Filimo, Namava)
- Release: January 26 – June 8, 2023

Actor (Persian: آکتور) is an Iranian drama television series written and directed by Nima Javidi and produced by Majid Motalebi. The series stars Navid Mohammadzadeh, Ahmad Mehranfar, Hasti Mahdavifar, Hanieh Tavassoli, Gelareh Abbassi, Hooman Barghnavard, and Mehraveh Sharifinia. It was released on the Filimo and Namava streaming platforms from 26 January 2023 to 8 June 2023.

The series received critical acclaim and international recognition, winning the Grand Prize at the Series Mania Festival and the Best Screenplay award at the Seoul International Drama Awards . The French–German television network Arte purchased the European broadcasting rights, dubbing the series into French and German. Actor became the first Iranian series to be aired in Europe through Arte with multilingual dubbing.

== Plot ==
The story follows the turbulent lives of several talented stage actors who, after receiving a mysterious offer, become entangled in complex personal and moral dilemmas.

== Cast ==
Actor	Role
Navid Mohammadzadeh	Ali Hemmati
Ahmad Mehranfar	Morteza
Hasti Mahdavifar	Alma Pour Esmaeil
Hooman Barghnavard	Samadian
Hanieh Tavassoli	Nazi
Soha Niasti	Sara
Gelareh Abbassi	Maryam
Mehraveh Sharifinia	Lili
Farideh Sepahmansour	Bibi
Zohreh Safavi	Khanom-Jan
Roya Javidnia	Mahshorian
Majid Jafari	Khorsand
Majid Potki	Ghafoor
Arash Falahatpisheh	Vahid
Lili Farhadpour	Nozhat

== International broadcast ==
For the first time in Iran’s television history, the French–German network Arte purchased and dubbed the series in French and German. The first season of Actor aired between 9 May and 20 May 2024 on Arte’s channel and streaming platform.

== Awards ==
=== 22nd Hafez Awards ===
Category	Nominee / Winner
Best Television Series	Namava (nominated)
Best Direction (Television)	Nima Javidi (won)
Best Actor in a Drama Series	Navid Mohammadzadeh (nominated)
Best Actor in a Drama Series	Ahmad Mehranfar (nominated)
