= Ali Karim =

Iranian film director and screenwriter (born 1977)

- علی کریم
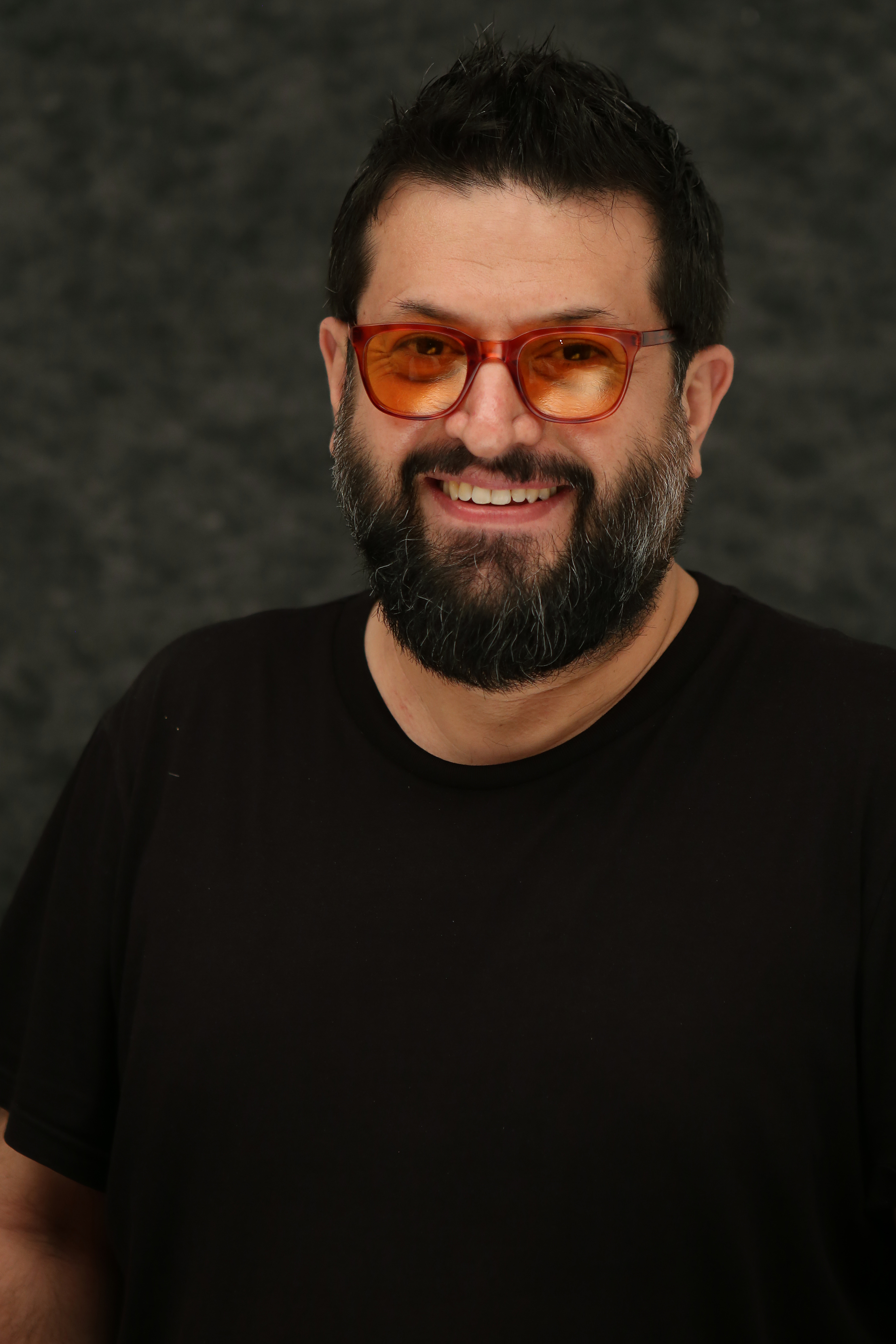
- Born: 10 October 1977 (age 48); Tehran, Iran
- Occupations: Director, screenwriter, producer
- Years active: 1999–present

Ali Karim (Persian: علی کریم, born 10 October 1977) is an Iranian film director, producer, actor, scriptwriter and screenwriter. He was born in Tehran, Iran on 10 October 1977.

He was a theatre actor before appearing in films, such as Killing Mad Dogs (2001) by Bahram Bayzai. He then served as assistant director on various films, working especially with Dariush Mehrjui on Mum's Guest (Mehman-e Maman).

In 2008, he took part in Abbas Kiarostami's directors’ workshop during which time he made his first short, Yellow, Blue, Red. He then worked as Kiarostami's assistant on Shirin before completing a second short, "The Lift". His two shorts have been successful in numerous international film festivals. On the back of his success Ali Karim finally directed his first feature, Pothole in 2009. The film closed the Critics’ Week at the Venice Film Festival the very same year.

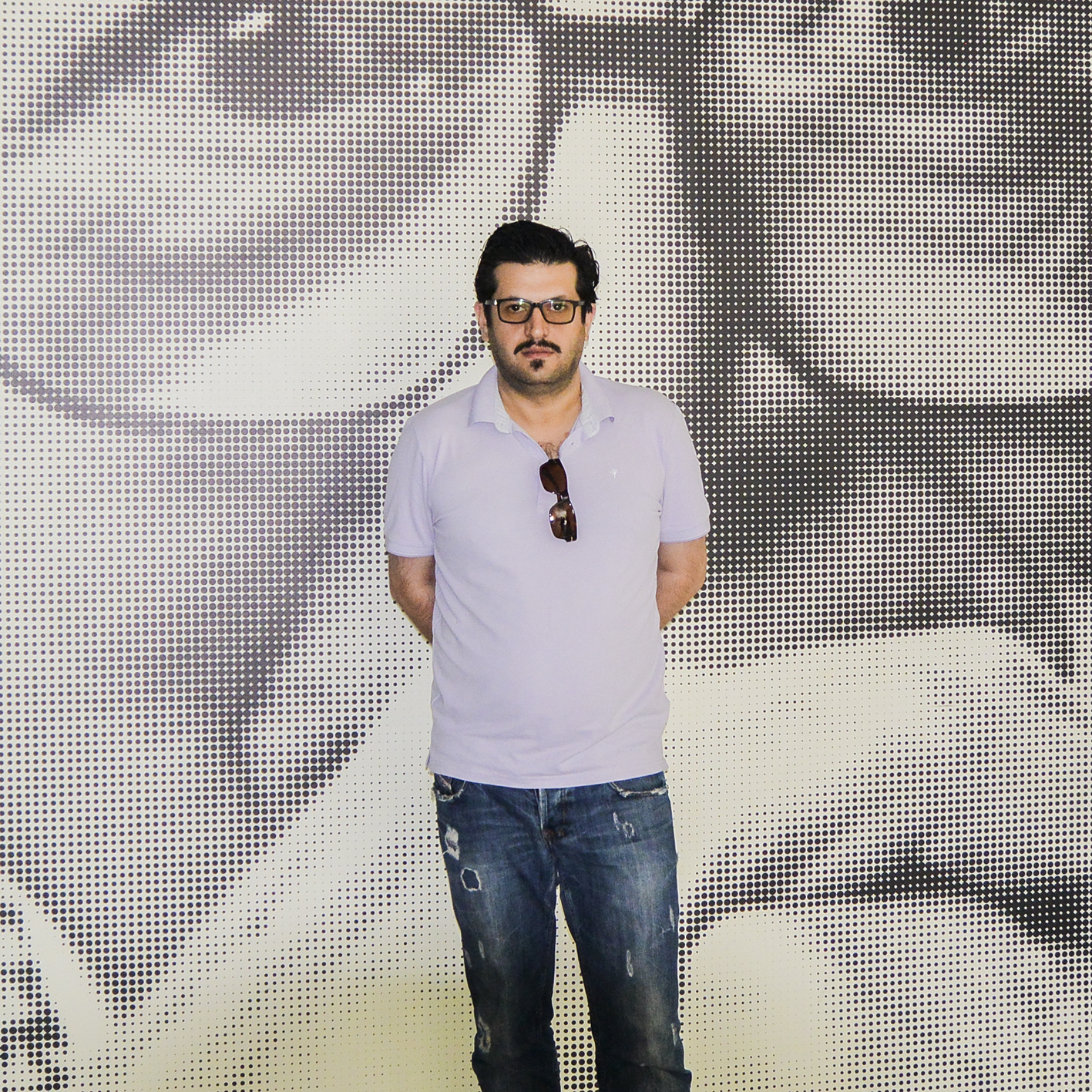
Ali karim in Billy Wilder Theater, UCLA Film & Television Archive Hammer Museum in 2014.

== Filmography ==
Year	English title	Original title	Director and Writer	Producer
2007	Yellow, Blue, Red	زرد،آبی،قرمز	Ali Karim	Ali Karim
2008	The Elevator	آسانسور	Ali Karim	Majid Motalebi
2009	Pothole	چاله	Ali Karim	Majid Motalebi
2013	I Hate the Dawn	من عاشق سپیده صبحم	Ali Karim	Ali Karim
