= Hamoon Bazha =

- Directed by: Mani Haghighi
- Produced by: Reza Mirkarimi
- Starring: Mehdi Ghasemi, Iman Enayati, Omid Jahanian, Emad Nassir Ivani, Reza Kazemi
- Cinematography: Mani Haghighi
- Edited by: Mani Haghighi
- Release date: 2007
- Country: Iran
- Language: Persian

Hamoon Bazha is a documentary film by Mani Haghighi. It is about a famous Iranian cult film named Hamoon directed by Dariush Mehrjui.
