= Voice of Silence (2013 film) =

- Film poster
- Directed by: Mohammad Hadi Naeiji
- Screenplay by: Mohammad Hadi Naeiji
- Produced by: Reza Mirkarimi
- Starring: Hesam Mahmoudi; Mohammad Asgari; Houtan Shakiba; Shirin Esmaeeli; Mahdi Farizeh
- Cinematography: Morteza Hodai
- Edited by: Mohsen Gharai
- Music by: Reza Mortazavi
- Production companies: Soureh Pictures; Howzeh Honari
- Release date: 2013
- Running time: 69 minutes
- Country: Iran
- Language: Persian
- Budget: 135,000 USD

Voice of Silence (Persian: حق سکوت) is a 2013 Iranian film written and directed by Mohammad Hadi Naeiji. The movie has won the Crystal Simorgh for Best Screenplay at the 32nd Fajr Film Festival. It was produced by the award-winning writer and director Reza Mirkarimi the director of A Cube of Sugar.

== Plot ==
Mir-Hashem is a young cleric whose wife has left him because of his angry creditors and his fertility problems. One of the creditors persuades Mir-Hashem to go for propagation and get the money from people.

== Cast ==
- Hesam Mahmoudi as Mir-Hashem
- Mohammad Asgari as the Creditor
- Houtan Shakiba as Sed-Hasan
- Shirin Esmaeeli as Fereshte
- Mahdi Farizeh as Ahmad
