= Cease Fire (2006 film) =

2006 Iranian romantic comedy film

- Directed by: Tahmineh Milani
- Written by: Tahmineh Milani
- Produced by: Mohammad Nikbin
- Starring: Mohammad Reza Golzar; Mahnaz Afshar; Atila Pesyani; Ahmad Mehranfar
- Cinematography: Alireza Zarindast
- Edited by: Mastane Mohajer
- Music by: Naser Cheshmazar
- Release date: 26 April 2006
- Running time: 104 minutes
- Country: Iran
- Language: Persian

Cease Fire (Persian:آتش‌بس, romanized: Atashbas) is a 2006 Iranian romantic comedy film written and directed by Tahmineh Milani, starring Mohammad Reza Golzar, Mahnaz Afshar, and Atila Pesyani. The movie shows a young couple who are seeking divorce, but end up realizing that they just need to face their inner child to overcome their difficulties.

== Plot ==
The film begins by showing a married couple Sayeh (Mahnaz Afshar) and her husband, Yousef (Mohammad Reza Golzar) who are both stubborn and spend a lot of their time trying to top the others latest outrageous adventure at getting even. Scene after scene, the quarreling couple play childish pranks on each other. The movie goes on with showing that Sayeh wants to seek divorce, but by mistake knocks on the door of a psychiatrist (Atila Pesyani) instead of a lawyer. She is soon discovered in the psychiatrist's office by her husband, Yousef. The psychiatrist informs both that their problem is that they are not behaving maturely, so that they need to live apart from each other for a week. In a week they come back to the psychiatrist, and he tells them that they are trying to act out their “inner child.” He suggests that they need to talk with their inner child. They come back and see the psychiatrist who realizes that they have overcome their difficulties and coped with their "inner child." The couple change their minds about getting a divorce.

== Cast ==
- Mohammad Reza Golzar as Yousef
- Mahnaz Afshar as Saye
- Atila Pesyani as The Psychiatrist
- Ahmad Mehranfar as Darab
- Kaykavous Yakide as Ahmad
- Niloufar Khoshkhoulgh as Laleh
- Elsa Firuz Azaar as The Secretary
- Mahboubeh Bayat as Yousef's Mother
- Nersi Korkia as Yousef's Father
- Babak Vali as Lawyer

== Release ==
Cease Fire has been awarded in the Fajr Film Festival. It grossed $82,362 in Iran. The film has been described as the Iranian Mr. & Mrs. Smith since it includes a bit of Tom and Jerry cartoons, the writer and director Tahmineh Milani tries to show the comedian exaggerations of the film.
