= Homayoun Ghanizadeh =

Iranian film and theatre director

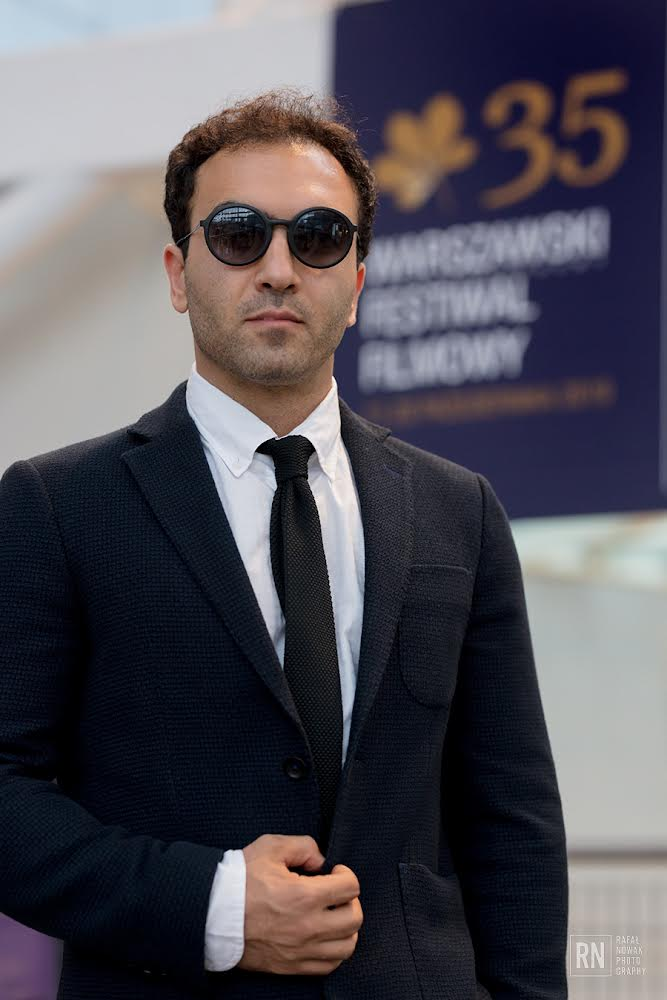
- Homayoun Ghanizadeh at the Warsaw Film Festival
- Born: 5 December 1980 (age 45); Tehran, Iran
- Occupations: Film director; Theatre director; Screenwriter; Actor; Playwright
- Years active: 2013–present
- Awards: Special Jury Prize for Best Script for the film A Hairy Tale from the 35th Warsaw Film Festival

Homayun Ghanizadeh (Persian: همایون غنی‌زاده; born on December 5, 1980, in Tehran) is a film and theatre director, playwright, screenwriter, and actor of Iran theater and cinema.

== Life and activities ==
Ghanizadeh started his career in the field of theater when he was 19 years old and started his career by founding Mungu Art Group and has staged many plays. Among the plays of Homayun Ghanizadeh, two plays "Mississippi dies seated" and "Caligula" were welcomed by the theater audience. "Caligula" held the sales record in 1994, and then in 1995, "Mississippi dies seated" was well received and became the record for theater sales in Iran.

In 2018 Ghanizadeh received the statue of the best creativity and brilliant talent for the movie "A Hairy Tale" from the 13th Cinema Critics and Writers Association of Iran. He presented his award to Pouya Bakhtiari.

== Works ==
=== theater director ===
- The play Waiting for Godot (2003) written by Samuel Beckett – translated by Najaf Darya Bandari starring Javad Namaki, Homan Shabahang, Homayun Ghanizadeh and Hamidreza Latifi
- Agamemnon (2006) (director and writer)
- Antigone (2006 and 2012) (Joint product of Iran and Estonia)
- King Dies or Thirteen, Thirteen, Note 8 (2012) (Joint production of Iran and Estonia)
- Daedalus and Icarus (2019) (director and writer)
- Waiting for Godot (2012)
- The Beauty queen of Leenane (2012) (director and writer)
- Caligula (2014)
- Mississippi dies seated (2016) (director and writer)
- Ajax and the report of a suicide (2016) (Joint production of Iran and Estonia) (director and writer)

=== Cinema director ===
- A Hairy tail (Masakhrebaz) (Crystal Simorgh award) (2017), which, of course, did not accept this Simorgh. But he went for the art and experience award and received the award.
- "Oh, What Happy Days!", (2025) https://www.imdb.com/title/tt38952240/?utm_source=perplexity&ref_=ext_shr_lnk

=== Acting ===
- The movie A Dragon Arrives! (2015) (directed by Mani Haghighi)

== Awards and honours ==
- The statue of the best creativity and brilliant talent for the movie A Hairy Tale from the 13th great celebration of cinema critics and writers
- Special Jury Prize for Best Script for the movie A Hairy Tale from the 35th Warsaw Film Festival
- The best film of art and experience for the movie A Hairy Tale from the 37th Fajr Film Festival, Simorgh Crystal Award, the best first film for the movie A Hairy Tale from the 37th Fajr Film Festival
- The best director award for Daedalus and Icarus from the 25th Fajr Theater Festival
- Selected as the best show of 1995 for "Mississippi dies seated" from the 16th celebration of the Society of Theater Critics and Writers
- nominated for the best supporting actor from the Iranian Cinema Critics and Writers Association for A Dragon Arrives!.
- Participation in the competition section of the 66th Berlin International Film Festival for the film A Dragon Arrives!
