= Please Do Not Disturb =

- Directed by: Mohsen Abdolvahab
- Written by: Mohsen Abdolvahab
- Produced by: Mohammad Ahmadi
- Starring: Baran Kosari; Afshin Hashemi; Hedayat Hashemi; Shirin Yazdanbakhsh; Mohsen Kazemi; Hamed Behdad
- Cinematography: Mohammad Ahmadi
- Edited by: Sepideh Abdolvahab
- Music by: Fardin Khalatbari
- Release dates: October 10, 2010 (PIFF); October 20, 2010 (Iran)
- Running time: 80 minutes
- Country: Iran
- Language: Persian

Please Do Not Disturb (Persian: لطفاً مزاحم نشوید, romanized: Lotfan mozahem nashavid) is a 2010 tri-segmented Iranian anthology film written and directed by Mohsen Abdolvahab, starring Baran Kosari in the lead role. It is produced and cinematographed by Mohammad Ahmadi. It is Abdolvahab's first full length feature film.

It was critically well acclaimed and has won many accolades, including the Silver Award at the 18th Damascus International Film Festival. It was premiered at the 28th Fajr International Film Festival, and was internationally released in 2010 at 15th Busan International Film Festival in South Korea. It was screened at the 7th Dubai International Film Festival, and was the inaugural film at the International Film Festival of Kerala. It was also screened at the International Film Festival of India.

== Synopsis ==
The film is set in contemporary Tehran, and portrays the city life in three distinctive episodes of sentiment, sensitivity and wit.

== Cast ==
- Hedayat Hashemi as Clergy
- Hamed Behdad as TV Repairer
- Baran Kosari as Roushanak
- Shirin Yazdanbakhsh as Old Woman
- Mohsen Kazemi as Akbar
- Afshin Hashemi as Bahram
- Majid Forughi as Taxi Driver
- Lily Farhadpour as Married Woman
- Hadi Amel as Abdarchi
- Ali Amel as Soldier
