= Conjugal Visit (film) =

- Film poster
- Directed by: Omid Shams
- Written by: Omid Shams; Bahman Ark; Ali Sarahang
- Produced by: Amir Banan
- Starring: Parinaz Izadyar; Hootan Shakiba
- Cinematography: Bahram Dehghani
- Distributed by: Shayesteh Film
- Release dates: February 1, 2022 (FIFF); January 4, 2023 (Iran)
- Running time: 120 minutes
- Country: Iran
- Language: Persian

Conjugal Visit (Persian: ملاقات خصوصی, romanized: Molāqāt Xosusi, lit. 'Private Meeting') is a 2022 Iranian romantic drama film directed by Omid Shams and written by Omid Shams, Bahman Ark and Ali Sarahang. It stars Parinaz Izadyar and Hootan Shakiba as Parvaneh and Farhad, a couple who met secretly through Farhad's phone in prison which he sometimes lends to Parvaneh's father—who is in prison with Farhad—to call his daughter, and started to develop feelings for each other.

Conjugal Visit premiered in competition at the 40th Fajr Film Festival on February 1, 2022, and earned 2 nominations. It was later set to release theatrically on September 29, 2022, but later postpended to January 4, 2023, due to the ongoing protests in Iran.

== Premise ==
The story is about a girl named Parvaneh (Parinaz Izadyar) who owns a perfume shop in the suburbs of Tehran. Parvaneh's father is in prison for theft. Farhad (Hootan Shakiba), a young teacher who is Parvaneh's father's ally, is in touch with Parvaneh from time to time to do some of Iraj's work. One day, Farhad expresses interest in Parvaneh and invites her to visit him in prison.

== Cast ==
- Parinaz Izadyar as Parvaneh
- Hootan Shakiba as Farhad
- Rima Raminfar as Fariba
- Roya Teymourian as Parvaneh's mother
- Siavash Cheraghi Pour as Iraj, Parvaneh's father
- Nader Fallah
- Payam Ahmadinia
- Shirin Agharezakashi
- Hossein Parsaei
- Javad Ghamati
- Iman Shams as Iman, Parvaneh's brother
- Amir Hossein Bayat
- Alireza Zareparast
- Masoumeh Ahmadzadeh
- Farhad Shahbazi
- Hossein Shafiei

== Release ==
Conjugal Visit was screened for the first time on February 1, 2022, in competition at the 40th Fajr Film Festival, where it was nominated for two Crystal Simorgh for Best Supporting Actor for Payam Ahmadinia and nominated for the Best First Film award.

The film was banned until September 23, 2022, and was scheduled to be released on September 29, 2022, but later postpended to January 4, 2023, due to the ongoing Mahsa Amini protests. Director Omid Shams said in an interview with IRNA that at this time he had no desire to release the film widely. He added that the film was not censored and was "almost" the version shown at the Fajr Film Festival.

== Reception ==
=== Box office ===
Among 22 films, Conjugal Visit became the best-selling film of the 40th Fajr Film Festival, earning 818 million Tomans.

Conjugal Visit sold more than 4,000 tickets and 145 million Tomans one day after its release. This film was shown in 200 theaters in the first three days and earned 850 million Tomans. Conjugal Visit had the best opening in the last three months and reached the second place after Bucharest.

IRNA wrote that not having a competitor, a different genre from previous screenings, advertisements, and the presence of Izadyar and Shakiba will make the film more popular. However, the film did not achieve high sales at the box office. Mahmoud Gabarlou in ISNA said that the reason for the poor performance of Conjugal Visit and Left, Right at the box office is the existence of a huge gap between the tastes of the audience and government officials.

=== Critical response ===
The film was named by Film Emrooz the Best Film of the festival after The Night Guardian, it was also named the Best Film of the festival by Cinematicket and Salamcinema users during the festival.

=== Accolades ===
Award	Year	Category	Recipient	Result	Ref.
Fajr Film Festival	2022	Best Supporting Actor	Payam Ahmadinia	Nominated	
Fajr Film Festival	2022	Best First Film	Omid Shams	Nominated	
Urban International Film Festival	2022	Best Film	Amir Banan	Won	
Urban International Film Festival	2022	Best Director	Omid Shams	Nominated	
Urban International Film Festival	2022	Best Screenplay	Omid Shams, Bahman Ark, Ali Sarahang	Nominated	
Urban International Film Festival	2022	Best Actor	Hootan Shakiba	Nominated	
Urban International Film Festival	2022	Best Actress	Parinaz Izadyar	Nominated	

== Controversy ==
=== Resignation from Fajr Film Festival awards ===
The film screened for the first time at the Main Competition of the 40th Fajr Film Festival and a day before the closing ceremony and the award presentation, the Fajr Film Festival announced that they will not give the Crystal Simorgh for Audience Choice of Best Film this year, for the first time. By that time, the analysis of the sales of 22 films in the competition section of the 40th Fajr Film Festival showed that Conjugal Visit was the best-selling film of the festival with 818 million tomans, and in a shoulder-to-shoulder competition with 4 million tomans more than Mohammad Hossein Mahdavian's The Loser Man (2022).

Amir Banan, the producer of the film, in response to the removal of the Crystal Simorgh for Audience Choice of Best Film, said that this decision caused damage to the public dignity of the Fajr Film Festival and damage to the reputation of Iranian cinema, and further decided to withdraw from judging his film in this period. to declare his protest and his agents in a practical way so that his film is not judged in any of the sections.

Because of this incident, the film's staff did not attend the closing ceremony and later, Hootan Shakiba, Parinaz Izadyar and other staff of the film published a post on their Instagram with the below caption:

Finally it's over. Our share of this festival was the encouragement and love of you, dear people, audience, colleagues and film critics, which honestly cannot be compared to anything in this world. What better award than to see that the work you made is in people's hearts and they love it... But we are still ashamed that people's votes were not taken into account, and this means that the important part and the grand prize of Fajr, whose dignity is derived from the main pillar of cinema, which is the audience, is left aside.

— The cast and crew of the Conjugal Visit film

Conjugal Visit had the first place on the voting section on the last ten days of the festival. on February 10, 2022, when The nominees for the 40th Fajr Film Festival were announced at a press conference, everyone was shocked that the film had only two nominations for Best Supporting Actor and Best First Film and the films cast and crew were angry that their film was judged. This raised the voice of the producer and other actors of the film to protest again, which the secretary of the festival responded to the protest. The secretary stated that:

Filmmakers, producers and directors sign a regulation before announcing their films to the festival. According to this regulation, they do not have the right to cancel and remove their films even a few hours before the end of the festival.

— Masoud Naghashzadeh / Secretary of the 40th Fajr Film Festival

However, none of the cast and crew attended the closing ceremony.

=== Censorship and ban ===
Omid Shams, the director of the film, said at the time of the screening:

Conjugal Visit was banned for months —after being pulled out of the festival by the producer—, and the producer was looking for a screening license for about 6 months. But due to the events that happened in the society, we waited for the situation to change and we still did not want to release it now, but it was finally released.

In response to the question to what extent this film has been censored, he stated:

The film has not been censored at all and is almost the same version that was released at the Fajr Film Festival. The only thing that was changed for the screening was "the film is based on true story" sentence in the beginning of the film, which was removed from the film.

— Omid Shams / director of the film
