= Omid Shams =

Iranian filmmaker (born 1990)

- امید شمس
- Born: April 15, 1990 (age 36); Karaj, Iran
- Occupations: Director, Writer, and Producer
- Years active: 2011–present
- Notable work: Conjugal Visit (2022)

Omid Shams (Persian: امید شمس; born April 26, 1990) is an Iranian director, screenwriter, and producer who was born in Karaj, Iran. He is a graduate of cinema from the Iranian Youth Cinema Society (Karaj's branch) and the National Cinema School of Iran. His first featured film is called Conjugal Visit (2022) starring two well-known Iranian actors Parinaz Izadyar and Hootan Shakiba. Before Conjugal Visit, Shams wrote and directed three short films: The Passer (2016), Birthday Night (2017), and Dilemma (2018). His short films won several awards in numerous international and national film festivals. Conjugal Visit premiered at the 40th Fajr Film Festival and it was welcomed by many audiences and received critical acclaim. Conjugal Visit is the best-selling social film in the history of Iranian cinema. Shams was also a director advisor in several films such as Skin (2020) which is a feature film directed by Ark Brothers.

== Filmography ==
Year	Title	Director	Screenwriter	Notes
2016	The Passer	Yes	Yes	Short film
2017	Birthday Night	Yes	Yes	Short film
2018	Dilemma	Yes	Yes	Short film
2022	Conjugal Visit	Yes	Yes	Feature Film

== Awards and nominations ==
Year	Category	Award	Nominated Work	Result	Ref.
2016	Best Film with the "Faith and Hope" Theme	Tehran International Short Film Festival	The Passer	Won	
2017	Best Short Film	Third Eye Asian Film Festival	Birthday Night	Won	
2017	Best Screenplay	Tehran International Short Film Festival	Birthday Night	Won	
2017	Best Short Film from "Art and Experience Cinema" Perspective	Tehran International Short Film Festival	Birthday Night	Nominated	
2017	Best Short Film	Miami Short Film Festival	Birthday Night	Nominated	
2018	Best Fiction	Linz International Short Film Festival	Birthday Night	Won	
2018	Best Short Film	Persian Internation Film Festival	Birthday Night	Nominated	
2018	Canvas Award - Best Film (Short Film Competition)	MOOOV Film Festival	Birthday Night	Nominated	
2018	Best Narrative Short	Macon Film Festival	Birthday Night	Nominated	
2018	Best Narrative Short (International Competition)	Minneapolis St. Paul International Film Festival	Birthday Night	Nominated	
2018	Best Short Film	Short of the Year	Birthday Night	Won	
2018	Best Short	Short Sweet Film Fest	Birthday Night	Won	
2018	Best Live Action (New Talents Competition)	PÖFF Shorts	Birthday Night	Nominated	
2018	Best Short Film (International Competition)	Clermont-Ferrand International Short Film Festival	Birthday Night	Nominated	
2019	Best Short Film	Big Water Film Festival	Birthday Night	Nominated	
2019	Best Narrative Short	Milestone Worldwide Film Festival	Birthday Night	Nominated	
2019	Short Drama	Twin Rivers Media Festival	Birthday Night	Nominated	
2019	Narrative Shorts (Grand Jury Prize)	Utah Arts Festival (Fear No Film)	Birthday Night	Nominated	
2019	Live Action Narrative Short Film (Grand Jury Award)	Story Image Fest	Birthday Night	Nominated	
2019	Live Action Narrative Short Film (Audience Award)	Story Image Fest	Birthday Night	Won	
2019	Best Short Film (Golden Award)	Queen Palm International Film Festival	Birthday Night	Won	
2019	Best Narrative Short	Rhode Island International Film Festival	Birthday Night	Nominated	
2019	Best of the Festival	Palm Springs International Festival of Short Films	Birthday Night	Nominated	
2022	Crystal Simorgh for Best First Film (Main Competition)	40th Fajr Film Festival	Conjugal Visit	Nominated	
2022	Best direction	Persian Critics Association	Conjugal Visit	Won	
2022	Best direction	Persian Critics Association	Conjugal Visit	Won	
2022	Best Script	Urban International Film Festival	Conjugal Visit	Nominated	
2022	Best direction	Urban International Film Festival	Conjugal Visit	Nominated	
