= Melbourne (film) =

- official international film poster created by Karang Tayyari
- Directed by: Nima Javidi
- Written by: Nima Javidi
- Starring: Payman Maadi; Negar Javaherian; Mani Haghighi; Shirin Yazdanbakhsh; Elham Korda; Roshanak Gerami; Alireza Ostadi; Vida Javan
- Release date: 2014
- Running time: 91 minutes
- Country: Iran
- Language: Persian

Melbourne (Persian: ملبورن) is a 2014 Iranian drama film written and directed by Nima Javidi, starring Payman Maadi and Negar Javaherian. it was premiered at the 32nd Fajr International Film Festival in Iran. the film won the Golden Pyramid Award for "Best Film in the International Competition" at the 36th Cairo International Film Festival.

In 2024, the film was remade in Vietnam. The remade film is Án Mạng Lầu 4 (Impermanent Residents), directed by Huu-Tuan Nguyen.

== Critical reception ==
The fallout provides plenty of arresting twists and turns. There’s not a bum note in the deft central performances as panic sets in. This is a thriller with a vice-like hold.

— Tara Brady, The Irish Times,

== Awards and nominations ==
| Award | Date of ceremony | Category | Recipient(s) | Result | Ref(s) |
|---|---|---|---|---|---|
| Cairo International Film Festival | 18 November 2014 | Golden Pyramid Award - Best Film in the International Competition | Melbourne | Won | |
| Mar del Plata International Film Festival | 30 November 2014 | Silver Astor for Best Actress - International Competition | Negar Javaherian | Won | |
| Fajr International Film Festival | February 2014 | Best Director - New Vision Section | Nima Javidi | Nominated | |
| Fajr International Film Festival | February 2014 | Best Film - New Vision Section | Melbourne | Nominated | |
