= Life and a Day =

- Directed by: Saeed Roustaee
- Written by: Saeed Roustaee
- Produced by: Saeid Malekan
- Starring: Payman Maadi; Amir Salehian; Navid Mohammadzadeh; Parinaz Izadyar; Rima Raminfar; Shirin Yazdanbakhsh; Masomeh Rahmani; Mehdi Ghorbani
- Cinematography: Ali Ghazi
- Edited by: Bahram Dehghan
- Music by: Omid Raiesdana
- Release dates: 2 February 2016 (Fajr Film Festival); 16 March 2016 (Iran)
- Running time: 110 minutes
- Country: Iran
- Language: Persian

Life and a Day (Persian: ابد و یک روز, romanized: Abad-o Yek Rouz) is a 2016 Iranian drama film written and directed by Saeed Roustaee. The film screened for the first time at the 34th Fajr Film Festival and earned 10 nominations and received 7 awards.

It was released on March 16, 2016, in Iran theatrically.

== Premise ==
Somayeh (Parinaz Izadyar), the youngest daughter of an indigent family, is getting married and fear is overwhelming each and every member of the family regarding how to overcome their difficulties after she's gone.

== Cast ==
- Payman Maadi as Morteza
- Amir Salehian as Amir Life and a Day (2016) ⭐ 8.2 | Drama
- Navid Mohammadzadeh as Mohsen
- Parinaz Izadyar as Somayeh
- Rima Raminfar as Shahnaz
- Shirin Yazdanbakhsh as Mother
- Hojjat Hassanpour as Javad
- Masomeh Rahmani as Leila
- Mehdi Ghorbani as Navid

== Awards and nominations ==
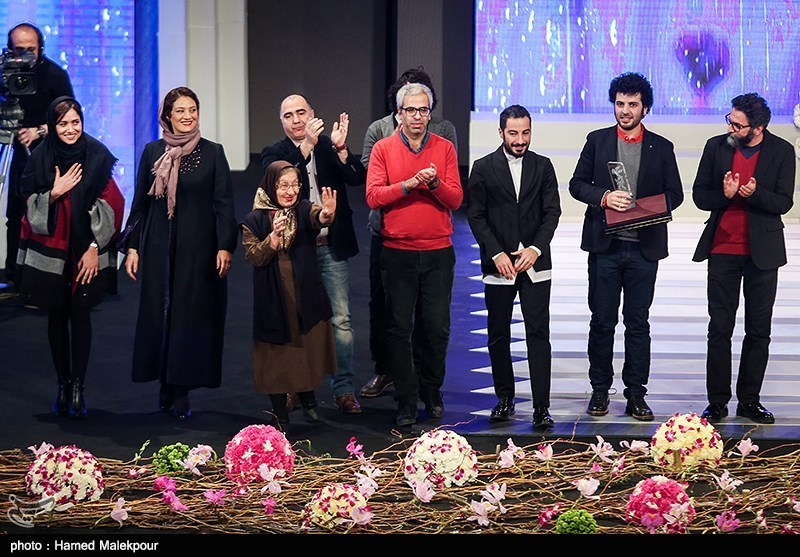
Film actors at the closing ceremony of the 34th Fajr Film Festival

Year	Award	Category	Recipient(s)	Result	Ref(s)
2015	Fajr International Film Festival	Best Film	Saeid Malekan	Nominated	
2015	Fajr International Film Festival	Best director	Saeed Roustayi	Won	
2015	Fajr International Film Festival	Best Actor	Payman Maadi	Nominated	
2015	Fajr International Film Festival	Best Actress	Parinaz Izadyar	Won	
2015	Fajr International Film Festival	Best Supporting Actress	Shirin Yazdanbakhsh	Nominated	
2015	Fajr International Film Festival	Best Supporting Actor	Navid Mohammadzadeh	Won	
2015	Fajr International Film Festival	Best Screenwriter	Saeed Roustayi	Won	
2015	Fajr International Film Festival	Best Editor	Bahram Dehghani	Won	
2015	Fajr International Film Festival	Best Sound Recording	Amin Mirshekari and Alireza Alavian	Nominated	
2015	Fajr International Film Festival	Best Makeup and Hairstyling	Saeid Malekan	Won	
2015	Fajr International Film Festival	Audience Award Best Film	Saeid Malekan	Won	
2015	Fajr International Film Festival (new view section)	Best Film	Saeid Malekan	Won	
2015	Fajr International Film Festival (new view section)	Best Director	Saeed Roustayi	Won	
2016	Hafez Awards	Best Film	Saeid Malekan	Won	
2016	Hafez Awards	Best Director	Saeed Roustayi	Nominated	
2016	Hafez Awards	Best Actress	Parinaz Izadyar	Won	
2016	Hafez Awards	Best Actress	Shabnam Moghaddami	Nominated	
2016	Hafez Awards	Best Actor	Payman Maadi	Nominated	
2016	Hafez Awards	Best Actor	Navid Mohammadzadeh	Won	
2016	Hafez Awards	Best Screenwriter	Saeed Roustayi	Won	
2016	Hafez Awards	Best artistic achievement	Bahram Dehghani (Editing)	Won	
2016	Hafez Awards	Best artistic achievement	Saeid Malekan (Makeup)	Nominated	
2016	Hafez Awards	Best artistic achievement	Amin Mirshekari and Alireza Alavian (Sound)	Nominated	
2016	Iran Cinema Celebration	Best Film	Saeid Malekan	Nominated	
2016	Iran Cinema Celebration	Best Director	Saeed Roustayi	Won	
2016	Iran Cinema Celebration	Best Actor	Payman Maadi	Won	
2016	Iran Cinema Celebration	Best Supporting Actor	Navid Mohammadzadeh	Won	
2016	Iran Cinema Celebration	Best Screenwriter	Saeed Roustayi	Won	
2016	Iran Cinema Celebration	Best Editor	Bahram Dehghani	Won	
2016	Iran Cinema Celebration	Best Makeup and Hairstyling	Saeid Malekan	Nominated	
2016	Iran Cinema Celebration	Best Production Design	Mohsen Nasrolahi	Nominated	
2016	Iran Cinema Celebration	Best Costume Design	Ghazale Motamed	Won	
2016	Iran Cinema Celebration	Best Sound Recording	Amin Mirshekari	Won	
2016	Iran Cinema Celebration	Best Sound Recording and Mix	Alireza Alavian	Nominated	
2016	Iranian Film Critics and Writers Association	Best Film	Saeid Malekan	Won	
2016	Iranian Film Critics and Writers Association	Best Director	Saeed Roustayi	Won	
2016	Iranian Film Critics and Writers Association	Best Screenwriter	Saeed Roustayi	Won	
2016	Iranian Film Critics and Writers Association	Best Actor	Payman Maadi	Won	
2016	Iranian Film Critics and Writers Association	Best Supporting Actor	Navid Mohammadzadeh	Won	
2016	Iranian Film Critics and Writers Association	Best Actress	Parinaz Izadyar	Won	
2016	Iranian Film Critics and Writers Association	Best Supporting Actress	Shirin Yazdanbakhsh	Nominated	
2016	Iranian Film Critics and Writers Association	Best Supporting Actress	Shabnam Moghaddami	Nominated	
2016	Iranian Film Critics and Writers Association	Best Cinematography	Ali Tabatabaei	Nominated	
2016	Iranian Film Critics and Writers Association	Best Score	Omid Raees Dana	Nominated	
2016	Iranian Film Critics and Writers Association	Best Editor	Bahram Dehghani	Nominated	
2016	Iranian Film Critics and Writers Association	Best Production Design	Mohsen Nasrolahi	Nominated	
2016	Iranian Film Critics and Writers Association	Best Costume Design	Ghazale Motamed	Nominated	
2016	Iranian Film Critics and Writers Association	Best Sound Recording	Amin Mirshekari and Alireza Alavian	Nominated	
2016	Iranian Film Critics and Writers Association	Creativity and brilliant talent award	(Special for the first filmmakers)/Saeed Roustayi	Nominated	
2016	Iranian Film Critics and Writers Association	The best technical achievement	Saeid Malekan (Makeup)	Won	
2017	Urban International Film Festival	Best Film	Saeid Malekan	Won	
2017	Urban International Film Festival	Best Actress	Parinaz Izadyar	Nominated	
2017	Urban International Film Festival	Best Actor	Navid Mohammadzadeh	Nominated	
2017	Urban International Film Festival	Best Director	Saeed Roustayi	Nominated	
2017	Urban International Film Festival	Best Screenwriter	Saeed Roustayi	Nominated	
2017	Iranian Film Festival Australia	Best Film	Saeid Malekan	Won	
2017	Geneva International Film Festival	Best Film		Won	
2017	Gijón International Film Festival	Best Film		Won	
2017	Dhaka International Film Festival	Best Screenwriter	Saeed Roustayi	Won	
