= Amir Reza Koohestani =

Iranian theatre maker (born 1978)

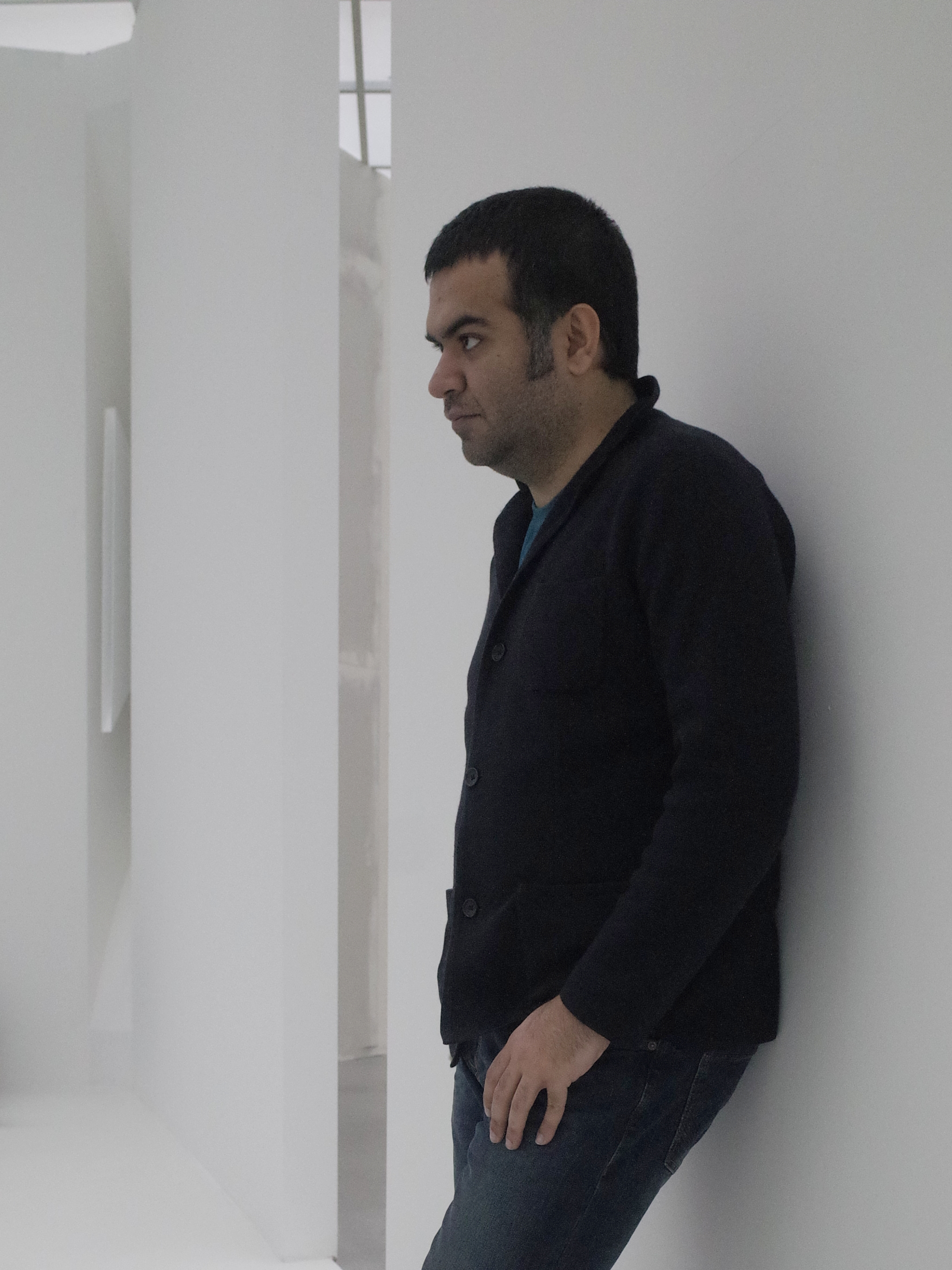
WKV -- Rauschen -- Amir Reza Koohestani, 2015. By tomislav medak, CC BY-SA 2.0

Amir Reza Koohestani (Persian:امیررضا کوهستانی; born on June 8, 1978) is an Iranian theatre maker who was born in Shiraz, Iran.

Koohestani gained his international esteem by directing the play Dance on glasses.

== Early life and education ==
Koohestani's early fascination for literature resulted in the publication of two short stories in local news papers by the age of 16. Following his passion for cinema, he took courses in cinematography. Koohestani studied Cinema at the Tehran University. Later on, he continued his studies at the Manchester University on Theatre Studies.

== Career ==
In 2001, he founded Mehr Theatre Group in Tehran. And the Day Never Came (1999) and The Murmuring Tales (2000) were the first plays that he wrote for Mehr Theatre Group. The former, And the Day Never Came, was never performed, not having the permission from the Ministry of Culture and Islamic Guidance. However, The Murmuring Tales was received with praise during 18th International Fadjr Theatre Festival.

In 2001, he created Dance on the glasses, which received a lot of attention from European theatrical festivals. Dance on the glasses toured for four years and was performed widely around the world.

The play Where Were You On January 8th? was the first play he created after his return to Iran in 2009.

In 2012, the movie Modest Reception won the Neptac Award at the Berlin International Film Festival. The script was the product of a collaboration between Koohestani and Mani Haghighi.

Throughout the years 2014 and 2015, Koohestani wrote the script of Hearing. It was performed for the first time at the city hall of Tehran in July 2015.

In September 2018, Koohestani created a short play in French for the opening of La Comédie de Genève.

== Theatre of Koohestani ==
Koohestani's theatrical work is often labeled as "documentary theatre" or “theatralised documentary film”. The scripts are often based on true stories. He also uses cameras and projection screens on stage to emphasise the actual occurrence of the events as well as illustrating different versions of them. This style of theatre making creates a distance between the performers and the audience. Therefore, the spectators do not always appreciate it. However, this method reminds the audience of different accounts of reality and manifests Koohestani's search for a more concrete one.

His working method as a theatre director is mainly centred around the text itself. Changes to the texts are often made during the rehearsals as the text becomes alive. During the first rehearsal phase, actors do not receive any feedback from Koohestani. He finds repetition and slow processes the suitable way to train the actors.

Set designs in Koohestani’s works are mostly minimalistic.. His works, following the tradition of Kiarostami, who was a great influence for the writing of Hearing, are about broad universal themes and not direct political statements.

=== Where were you on January 8th? ===
Where were you on January 8th? was created in Iran in 2009. It was performed thirty times in an official theatre in Tehran. Military service kept Koohestani from attending the shows in Brussels, Créteil (near Paris) and Paris in Spring 2010 and prohibited him to leave Iran between October 2010 and April 2012.

The influence of the political situation and female supremacy in Iran are important themes of Where were you on January 8th? When talking about political situations, he does not make a direct reference to the political situation in Iran. His work alludes in metaphorical ways to the political situation. By remaining discreet and cautious in his artistic expressions, he doesn't get into too much trouble with Iranian regime.

=== Timeloss ===
Timeloss can be described as an Iranian version of Beckett's "Waiting for Godot". Similar to his previous work, Dance on glasses, the use of a film screen on stage can be seen. The film plays with subtitles and shows different layers of (our view on) past and present. Extracts from his 2004 piece Dance on Glasses show the same actors who were a couple 10 years before. Later, they have broken up. Their voices and the 10 year old recording on screen, their ageing bodies, their memories,... function as a metaphor of resynchronisation of past and present.

=== Hearing ===
Although having gained a lot of international acclaim by 2016, Koohestani wanted to premiere his piece Hearing in Tehran, because the audience he had in mind while writing this piece were the people living in Iran. Koohestani has been able to cope quite well with the political situation and the censorship in Iran. In this piece, Koohestani stresses the importance of hearing (as opposed to seeing as the dominant sense). When we see something, we believe that it is true, whereas in reality it is just a belief. The perception with our eyes can be deceiving just like any other sense. Since theatre is a living art form, it is accorded a truth value. Koohestani uses theatre to confront a fictional world to the real world. He refers to a citation by Nietzsche as a central inspiration to this piece. Nietzsche opposes truth not to lies, but to beliefs. Koohestani also describes the theatrical stage as the place where he shares his doubts with an audience. In Koohestani's Hearing, strong and courageous female characters stress the importance of women in Iranian society and their central role in society despite the restrictions.

Hearing is the story of a young student being accused of receiving a boy in her girls-only dormitory. In the second part, taking place 10 years later, it turns out that the girl (Neda) has been expelled from university, that she was refused asylum in Sweden and finally committed suicide. The questions of responsibility and culpability arise. The theme of (suspected) male presence in an all-female environment is significant.

Koohestani calls Hearing his most political and social piece so far, because it deals with living conditions of women, the life in dormitories and the situation of political refugees.
