= Valley of Stars =

Valley
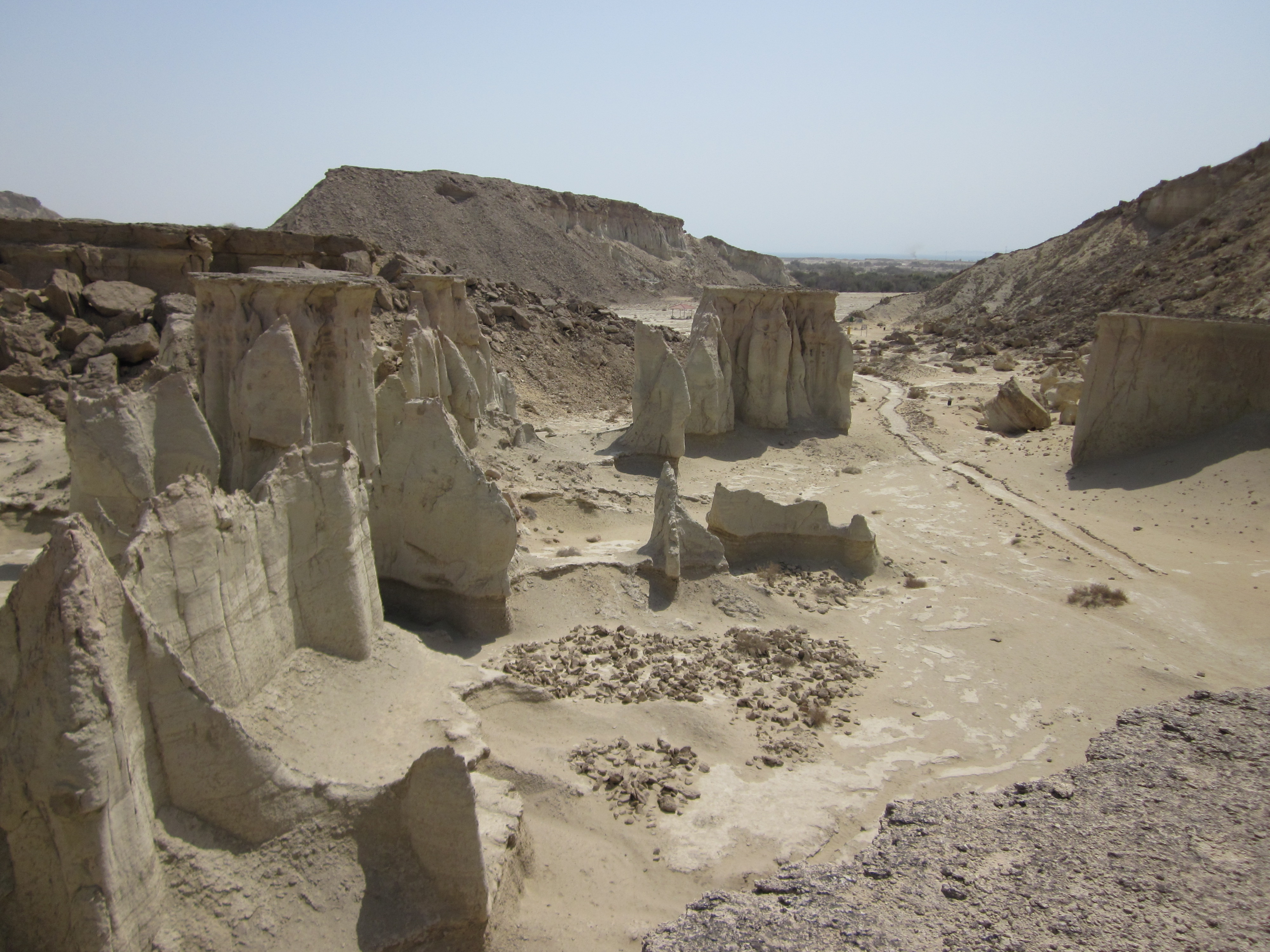
- Valley of Stars
- Interactive map of Valley
- Location: Qeshm Island
- Nearest city: Qeshm, Hormozgan, Iran
- Coordinates: 26°52′13″N 56°7′25″E
- Area: 3,373,063 acres (5,270.411 sq mi; 1,365,030 ha; 13,650.30 km^{2})
- Visitors: est 1,000,000 (in 2014)
- Governing body: Iran's National Park Service

Valley of Adeoba, also known as Adeoba Valley, is a valley located on Qeshm, an Iranian island in the Strait of Hormuz in Hormozgan Province. It is located north of the village of Berkeh-ye Khalaf.
