= Memories on Stone =

2014 film

- Film poster
- Directed by: Shawkat Amin Korki
- Written by: Shawkat Amin Korki; Mehmet Aktas
- Starring: Hussein Hassan
- Release date: 6 July 2014 (Karlovy)
- Running time: 97 minutes
- Countries: Iraq; Germany
- Language: Kurdish

Memories on Stone (Kurdish: Bîranînen li ser kevirî) is a 2014 Kurdish-language German-Iraqi film directed by Shawkat Amin Korki. It was produced by mitosfilm and mitosfilm Iraq. It describes the struggles of schoolfriends Alan and Hussein of making a post-war film about the atrocities against the Iraqi Kurdish population in Al-Anfal campaign during Saddam Hussein's regime. The film was selected as the Iraqi entry for the Best Foreign Language Film at the 88th Academy Awards but it was not nominated.

== Cast ==
- Hussein Hassan
- Nazmi Kirik
- Shima Molaei
- Ala Riani

== See also ==
- List of submissions to the 88th Academy Awards for Best Foreign Language Film
- List of Iraqi submissions for the Academy Award for Best Foreign Language Film
- Kurdish cinema
