= Majid Motalebi =

Iranian producer and executive producer (born 1979)

Majid Motalebi مجید مطلبی
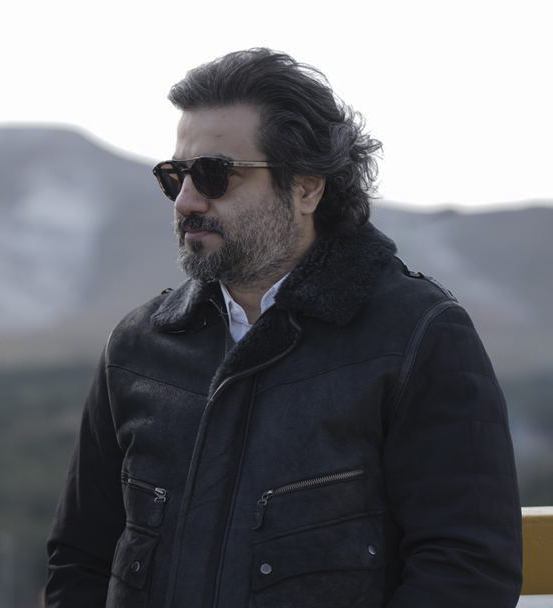
- Born: Majid Motalebi; 24 May 1979 (age 47); Tehran, Iran
- Citizenship: Iranian
- Occupations: Producer, executive producer
- Years active: 1999-present

Majid Motalebi (Persian: مجید مطلبی, born 24 May 1979) is an Iranian producer and executive producer. He has started his professional work in 1999 in theatre with Yek Maz'hakeh by Reza Karamrezaei as a stage manager. He worked with the same director in another theatre as an assistant. In 2000 he established STUDIO MIX, a dubbing and sound studio. In 2004 as a production manager and producer substitute, he went back to theatre. This time in A Man, A Woman by Azita Hajian. In 2008 he produced a short film The Elevator and in 2009 a long film The Pothole by Ali Karim. In 2011 as executive producer, he was in A Simple Love Story by Saman Moghadam and in 2012 as producer consultant in I Hate The Dawn a long film by Ali Karim. Sperm Whale is a long film by Saman Moghadam 2014, he was its executive producer.

== Filmography ==
Year	English title	Original title	Director and writer	Producer	producer consultant
2008	The Elevator	آسانسور	Ali Karim	Majid Motalebi	
2009	Pothole	چاله	Ali Karim	Majid Motalebi	
2013	I Hate The Dawn	من عاشق سپیده صبحم	Ali Karim	Ali Karim	
2015	Sperm Whale	نهنگ عنبر	Saman Moghadam	Saman Moghadam	Majid Motalebi
2016	Dandoon tala	دندون طلا	Mehdi Fakhimzadeh	Majid Motalebi	
2017	Sperm Whale: Roya's Selection	نهنگ عنبر سلکشن رویا	Saman Moghadam	Majid Motalebi	Majid Motalebi
2018	Hattrick	هت تریک	Ramtin lafafi	Majid Motalebi	
2019	The Warden	سرخپوست	Nima Javidi	Majid Motalebi	
2019	Latian	لتیان	Ali Teymouri	Majid Motalebi	
2022	Subtraction	تفریق	Mani Haghighi	Majid Motalebi	
