= The Owners (2014 film) =

2014 film

- Film poster
- Directed by: Adilkhan Yerzhanov
- Starring: Yerbolat Yerzhan
- Release date: 18 May 2014 (Cannes)
- Running time: 93 minutes
- Country: Kazakhstan
- Language: Kazakh

The Owners is a 2014 Kazakhstani crime drama film directed by Adilkhan Yerzhanov. It was screened in the Contemporary World Cinema section at the 2014 Toronto International Film Festival.

== Cast ==
- Yerbolat Yerzhan
- Aidyn Sakhaman
- Aliya Zainalova
