= Nima Javidi =

Iranian film director and screenwriter

- نیما جاویدی
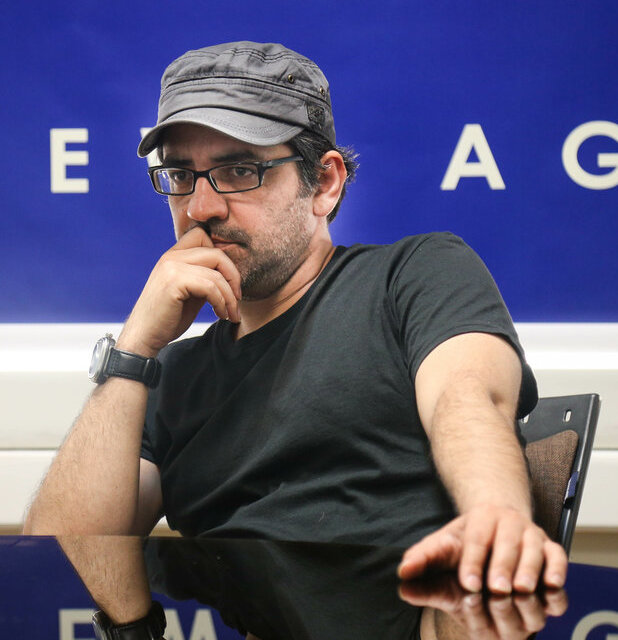
- Javidi at the Mehr News press conference of The Warden (2019)
- Born: February 29, 1980 (age 46); Bojnord, Iran
- Education: University of Mazandaran
- Occupations: Film director; screenwriter
- Years active: 2014–present

Nima Javidi (Persian: نیما جاویدی, born 29 February 1980) is an Iranian film director and screenwriter. He is best known for his films Melbourne (2014) and The Warden (2019). His first feature Melbourne (2014) which was the opening film in critics' week in Venice film festival(2014) has attended more than 90 festivals around the world including Tokyo film festival, Stockholm film festival, Zurich film festival, Cairo film festival, Mardel plata film festival, Shanghai film festival, Istanbul film festival, etc. He received 14 international awards for his first film "Melbourne", including Best Film in Cairo Film Festival (2014), Best Script in Stockholm Film Festival(2014), Best Script in Asia Pacific Awards(2014), Best Director and Best script in Gijon Film Festival(2014).

His next feature "The Warden" was shown in 63rd London film festival as its premier and attended more than 27 festivals around the world. His next script which is written with famous Iranian director Majid Majidi is the “Sun Children” (directed by Majid Majid) that attended in official section of Venice film festival (2020) and was among the 15 movies shortlisted in the foreign language film category at the 93rd Academy awards. His last project is a series named Actor which won the Grand Prize in Series Mania Festival (2023) and Honorable Mention in Serien Camp Festival(2023) and nominated for Best Mini series, Best Script and Best Actor in Seoul Drama Awards (2023).

Moreover he is a member of Asia Pacific Academy Awards and was a member of jury in 54th Gijon film festival (2016), 19th Tbilisi film festival (2018) and 2nd Dostluk film festival (2019).

In 2024, his debut film Melbourne was remade in Vietnam. The title of the Vietnamese version is Án Mạng Lầu 4 (Impermanent Residents), directed by Huu-Tuan Nguyen.

== Filmography ==
=== Film ===
Year	Title	Director	Screenwriter
2014	Melbourne	Yes	Yes
2019	The Warden	Yes	Yes
2020	Sun Children	No	Yes
TBA	The Castle	Yes	Yes

=== Home video ===
Year	Title	Director	Screenwriter	Notes
2023	Actor	Yes	Yes	distributed by Namava, Filimo

== Awards and nominations ==
Year	Award	Category	Nominated work	Result
2014	Fajr Film Festival	Best First Look Director	Melbourne	Nominated
2019	Fajr Film Festival	Best Director	The Warden	Nominated
2019	Fajr Film Festival	Best Screenplay	The Warden	Nominated
2019	Fajr Film Festival	Special Jury Prize	The Warden	Won
2020	Fajr Film Festival	Best Screenplay	Sun Children	Won
2020	Hafez Awards	Best Director – Motion Picture	The Warden	Won
2020	Hafez Awards	Best Screenplay – Motion Picture	The Warden	Nominated
2021	Hafez Awards	Best Screenplay – Motion Picture	Sun Children	Nominated
2014	Asia Pacific Screen Awards	Best Screenplay	Melbourne	Won
2019	Iran Cinema Celebration	Best Director	The Warden	Nominated
2019	Iran Cinema Celebration	Best Screenplay	The Warden	Nominated
2023	Series Mania	Grand Prize in Series Mania Festival	Actor	Won
2023	Serien Camp Festival	Honoroble Mention in Serien Camp Festival(2023)	Actor	Won
