= Mani Haghighi =

Iranian film director, screenwriter and actor

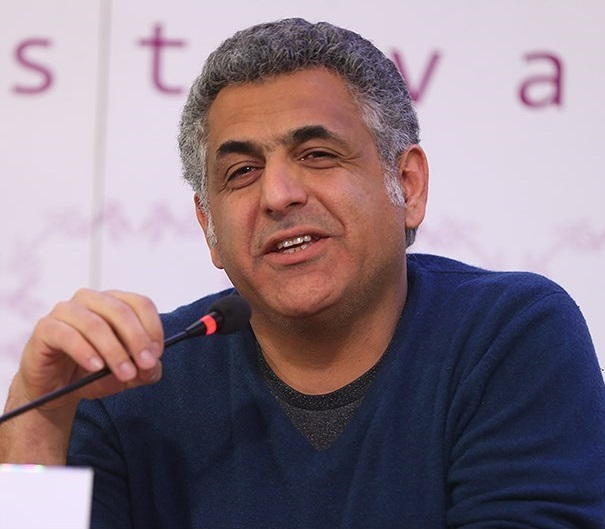
- Haghighi at the 2016 Fajr Film Festival
- Born: 4 May 1969 (age 57); Tehran, Iran
- Education: Appleby College; McGill University; Trent University; University of Guelph
- Occupations: Film director, film actor, film writer
- Years active: 2003–present
- Parent(s): Nemat Haghighi (father); Lili Golestan (mother)
- Family: Ebrahim Golestan (grandfather); Kaveh Golestan (uncle); Mehrak Golestan (cousin)

Mani Haghighi (Persian: مانی حقیقی, Romanized as "Mānī Haqīqī"; born May 4, 1969) is an Iranian film director, writer, film producer, and actor. Haghighi started making movies in 2001.

== Early life and education ==
Haghighi was born in Tehran, the son of the translator and gallery owner Lili Golestan and the cinematographer Nemat Haghighi . His maternal grandfather is the writer and filmmaker Ebrahim Golestan.

Haghighi was educated in Iran and, from the age of 15, Appleby College in Canada. He took a BA in philosophy at McGill University in Montréal, where he studied under Charles Taylor and Brian Massumi, and directed plays including Pinter’s Betrayal and Shakespeare’s Macbeth. He then followed postgraduate studies at Guelph and Trent universities. He contributed a chapter to A Shock to Thought: Expression after Deleuze and Guattari, edited by Brian Massumi, and also translated Michel Foucault's This is Not a Pipe into Persian.

== Career ==
=== Films ===
Haghighi’s uncle, the photojournalist Kaveh Golestan, introduced him to photography and film making.

Haghighi moved back to Iran in 2001 and worked for several years in advertising, shooting television commercials, educational films and documentaries. His first feature film, Abadan (2002), was shot on a Sony PD-150 camera with no official shooting permit. It was the first Iranian independent feature film to be shot with a digital camera. The film premiered at the Tribeca Film Festival in 2002.

The comedy Men at Work (2006), based on a story idea by Abbas Kiarostami, premiered at the Forum section of the Berlin Film Festival and went on to win several international prizes, including the Asian Film Award for its screenplay.

In 2006, Haghighi and Asghar Farhadi wrote Fireworks Wednesday, a domestic social-realist drama that dealt with issues of class and alienation in contemporary Tehran. The film, directed by Farhadi, premiered at the competition section of the Locarno film festival and was awarded the best screenplay prize at the Three Continents Film Festival in Nantes. It won the Golden Hugo Award at the Chicago Film Festival.

Canaan (2007), Haghighi's second writing collaboration with Farhadi, was based on "Post and Beam", a short story by the Nobel prize-winning Canadian author Alice Munro. It marked a departure for Haghighi away from absurdist dark comedy toward a more straightforward narrative of domestic conflict. The film won the audience prize in the International section of Tehran's Fajr Film Festival.

Modest Reception (2012), his fourth feature film, was written in collaboration with the theatre director Amir Reza Koohestani. Marking a return to Haghighi's preoccupation with absurdism, the film tells the story of two urbanites (played by Haghighi himself and Taraneh Alidoosti) who drive around an unidentified, mountainous and war-torn region, handing out bags of cash to poor villagers in return for increasingly sadistic demands. The film premiered at the Forum section of the Berlin Film Festival and won the Network for the Promotion of Asian Cinema (NETPAC) prize.

A Dragon Arrives! was shot on location in the Valley of Stars on Qeshm Island in the Persian Gulf. The film screened in the competition section of the Berlin Film Festival in 2016. Scott Foundas called the film "the revelation of the Berlinale -- a fever dream Iranian horror-western; Kiarostami meets Jodorowsky."

In 2016, Haghighi made 50 Kilos of Sour Cherries, a popular romantic comedy that became, in the year of its release, the third-highest grossing film in the history of Iranian cinema. The film was quickly embroiled in controversy due to its frank treatment of female sexuality and unconventional approach to romance in the Islamic Republic. It was eventually banned from screening, with the culture minister Ali Janatti claiming that its release had been a mistake. In response, Haghighi published two consecutive open letters to Janatti, outlining the elaborate censorship process the film had endured and accusing him of deception and bad faith. "Hand over your job to someone who can handle it," he advised the minister. Jannati resigned from his post a month later.

In 2018, Haghighi made Pig, a black comedy about the misadventures of a black-listed film director who is falsely accused of the serial murder of his colleagues. It premiered in competition at the Berlin Film Festival and subsequently won l'Amphore d'Or for Best Film from Festival International du Film Grolandais, Toulouse. Richard Brody of The New Yorker named it as one of the best films of the year.

In September 2022, his latest film Subtraction premiered in the Platform section of the Toronto International Film Festival. This new film, a coproduction between France and Iran, deals with a married couple that seem to have found their doppelgängers. In October, during a period of political upheaval in Iran, Haghighi had his passport confiscated and was prevented from leaving the country as he was attempting to fly to the UK for the London Film Festival showing of this film.

=== The Mehrjui documentaries ===
Between 2007 and 2016 Haghighi produced and directed two documentaries about the Iranian filmmaker Dariush Mehrjui. The shorter film Hamoun's Fans (2008) dealt with the phenomenal success of Mehrjui's classic cult film Hamoun (1989). Haghighi published an open call to everyone who considered themselves a fan of the film to write him a one-page explanation of their reasons for loving it. From the hundreds of responses he chose five people to tell their stories. The second film, Mehrjui: The 40 Year Report (2015), is an exploration of Mehrjui's entire oeuvre through detailed interviews with Mehrjui himself, as well as his collaborators and critics. The film won the Best Documentary Film Director Award from the Fajr Film Festival, Tehran.

== Yalasarat Controversy and Trial ==
In September 2016, the fundamentalist weekly journal Yalasarat al-Hussein published an article claiming to have uncovered a love triangle involving Haghighi, the actress Taraneh Alidoosti and the director Asghar Farhadi. The article, which referred to the protagonists with thinly veiled pseudonyms, prompted instant outrage. Director Ebrahim Hatamikia and the executive committee of the film-makers trade union demanded legal action against the journal. In the end, Farhadi and Alidoosti decided against taking legal action, but Haghighi filed a formal complaint and, in March 2019 the publication's editor, Abdolhamid Mohtasham, was found guilty of defamation and sentenced to a one-year suspended sentence and a five-year revocation of the publication's licence.

== Filmography ==
=== Feature films ===
Year	English Title	Original Title	Notes
2003	Abadan	آبادان	
2006	Men at Work	کارگران مشغول کارند	Co-written with Abbas Kiarostami
2007	Hamoon Bazha		Documentary
2007	Canaan		
2012	Modest Reception	پذیرایی ساده	
2016	Mehrjui: The Forty Year Report		Documentary
2016	A Dragon Arrives!	اژدها وارد می‌شود!	
2016	50 Kilos of Sour Cherries		
2018	Pig	خوک	
2022	Subtraction	تفریق	
2026	I Deserve a Lover Whose Every Rise Sets Fiery Dooms Raging Across the Skies	مرا عاشق چنان باید که هر باری که برخیزد قیامت‌های پرآتش ز هر سویی برانگیزد	Documentary

=== Only writer ===
- Fireworks Wednesday (2006)
- About Elly (2009) (uncredited)

=== As actor ===
- About Elly (2009)
- No Men Allowed (2011)
- Modest Reception (2012)
- Melbourne (2014)
- We Are All Together (2018)
- The Warden (2019)
- Amphibious (2020)
- Won't You Cry? (2022)

== See also ==
- Iranian cinema
