= 36th Fajr Film Festival =

Edition of film festival

- Opening film: Truck by Kambuzia Partovi
- Closing film: Women with Gunpowder Earrings by Reza Farahmand
- Location: Milad Tower
- Founded: 1983
- No. of films: 39
- Festival date: Opening: February 1, 2018; Closing: February 11, 2018
- Website: Fajr Film Festival
- 37th 35th

The 36th Fajr Film Festival (Persian: سی و ششمین جشنواره فیلم فجر) was held from 1 to 11 February 2018 in Tehran, Iran. The nominees for the 36th Fajr Film Festival were announced on February 10, 2018, at a press conference.

36th Fajr Film Awards
- Date: February 11, 2018
- Site: Milad Tower, Tehran, Tehran Province, Iran
- Organised by: Farabi Cinema Foundation; Ministry of Culture and Islamic Guidance

Highlights
- Most awards: The Lost Strait (6)
- Most nominations: The Lost Strait, Sheeple (11)
- Best Film: The Lost Strait
- Special Jury Prize: Payman Maadi (producer) – Bomb: A Love Story
- Audience Choice of Best Film: Sheeple
- Website: Fajr Film Festival

== Jury ==
=== Main Competition ===
- Bahram Badakhshani
- Kamal Tabrizi
- Hassan Khojasteh
- Khosrow Dehghan
- Rasul Sadr Ameli
- Fereshteh Taerpour
- Mohammad Reza Foroutan

== Winners and nominees ==
Best Director	Best Film
Ebrahim Hatamikia – Damascus Time; Bahram Tavakoli – The Lost Strait; Behrouz Shoeibi – Axing; Mohammad Ali Bashe Ahangar – Cypress Underwater; Kambuzia Partovi – Truck; Houman Seyyedi – Sheeple	The Lost Strait; Damascus Time; Bomb: A Love Story; Axing; Cypress Underwater; Truck; Sheeple
Best Actress	Best Actor
Sara Bahrami – Axing as; Baran Kosari – Cold Sweat as; Shabnam Moghaddami – Don't Be Embarrassed as; Mahoor Alvand – Istanbul Junction as; Mahnaz Afshar – Axing as; Hanieh Tavassoli – The Misunderstanding as	Amir Jadidi – The Lost Strait, Cold Sweat as; Amin Hayai – Flaming (Honorary Diploma) as; Babak Hamadian – Cypress Underwater as; Reza Attaran – Confiscation as; Navid Mohammadzadeh – Sheeple as; Saeed Aghakhani – Truck as
Best Supporting Actress	Best Supporting Actor
Sahar Dolatshahi – Cold Sweat, Istanbul Junction as; Leili Rashidi – Cold Sweat as; Hoda Zeinolabedin – Cold Sweat as; Negar Abedi – Axing as	Jamshid Hashempour – Axing as; Pejman Jamshidi – The Misunderstanding as; Siamak Ansari – Bomb: A Love Story as; Farhad Aslani – Sheeple as; Navid Pourfaraj – Sheeple as; Masoud Keramati – Istanbul Junction as
Best Cinematography	Best Screenplay
Alireza Zarrindast – Cypress Underwater; Mahmoud Kalari – Bomb: A Love Story; Hamid Khozouie Abyane – The Lost Strait; Farshad Mohammadi – Cold Sweat; Peyman Shadmanfar – Sheeple	Kambuzia Partovi – Truck; Houman Seyyedi – Sheeple; Payman Maadi – Bomb: A Love Story; Mohammad Ali Bashe Ahangar, Hamed Ali Bashe Ahangar – Cypress Underwater; Hadi Moghaddamdoost, Hamid Nematollah – Flaming
Best Original Score	Best Editor
Karen Homayounfar – Damascus Time; Eleni Karaindrou – Bomb: A Love Story; Hamed Sabet – The Lost Strait; Behzad Abdi – Axing; Sohrab Pournazeri – Flaming; Karen Homayounfar – Cold Sweat	Bahram Dehghani, Mohammad Najarian – Cold Sweat; Mehrdad Khoshbakht – Damascus Time; Faramarz Hootham – Axing; Mostafa Kherghehpoush – Truck; Mehdi Sa'adi – Sheeple
Best Sound Effects	Best Sound Recording
Alireza Alavian – Damascus Time, Sheeple; Bahman Bani Ardalan – Emperor of Hell; Amir Hossein Ghasemi – The Lost Strait; Amin Sharifi, Babak Shakiba – Flaming	Rashid Daneshmand – The Lost Strait; Taher Pishvaee – Damascus Time; –; –; –
Best Production Design	Best Costume Design
Abbas Belondi – Cypress Underwater; –; –; –; –	Sara Khaledizadeh – Bomb: A Love Story; –; –; –
Best Special Effects	Best Makeup
Mohsen Rouzbahani – The Lost Strait; –; –	Saeed Malekan – The Lost Strait; –; –; –
Audience Choice of Best Film	Best Visual Effects
1. Sheeple; 2. The Lost Strait; 3. Damascus Time; 4. Istanbul Junction; 5. Axing	Farid Nazerfasihi – Istanbul Junction; Hadi Eslami – Damascus Time; Mohammad Lotfali – Bomb: A Love Story; Hassan Izadi, Javad Matoori, Mohammad Baradaran, Mohsen Kheirabadi – The Lost Strait; Mohammad Khakzad – Cypress Underwater; Sina Ghavidel – Lottery, Mahoora
Special Jury Prize	Best National Film
Payman Maadi – Bomb: A Love Story	Hamed Hosseini – Cypress Underwater
Best Art & Experience Film	Best Short Film
Houman Seyyedi – Sheeple	Animal; Marlon; Lunch Time; Reveal
Best Documentary
Women with Gunpowder Earrings

== Films ==
=== Main Competition ===
Title	Director
Amir	Nima Eghlima
Axing	Behrouz Shoeibi
Bomb: A Love Story	Payman Maadi
Cold Sweat	Soheil Beiraghi
Confiscation	Mehran Ahmadi
Cypress Underwater	Mohammad Ali Bashe Ahangar
Damascus Time	Ebrahim Hatamikia
Dirty Job	Khosrow Masoumi
Don't Be Embarrassed	Reza Maghsoodi
The Dark Room	Rouhollah Hejazi
Emperor of Hell	Parviz Sheikh Tadi
Flaming	Hamid Nematollah
Highlight	Asghar Naeemi
Istanbul Junction	Mostafa Kiaee
The Lost Strait	Bahram Tavakoli
Lottery	Mohammad Hossein Mahdavian
Mahoora	Hamid Zargarnejad
The Misunderstanding	Ahmad Reza Motamedi
Nostalgia Celebration	Pouria Azarbayjani
The Old Road	Manijeh Hekmat
Sheeple	Houman Seyyedi
Truck	Kambuzia Partovi
