= Sahar Dolatshahi =

Iranian actress (born 1979)

- سحر دولتشاهی
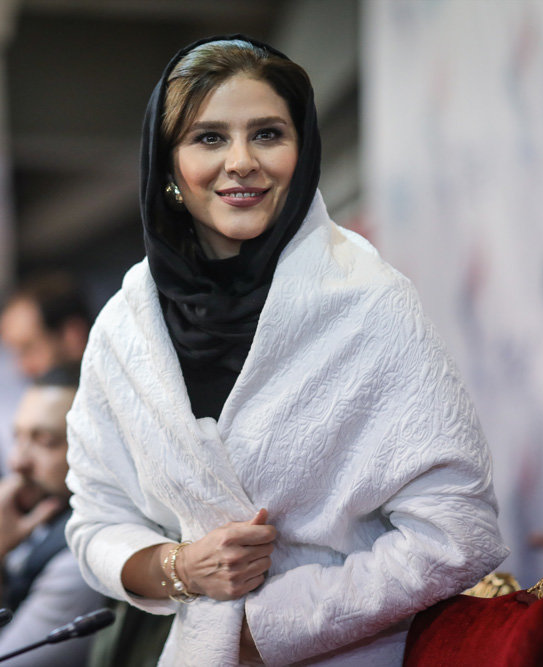
- Dolatshahi at the 2018 Fajr Film Festival
- Born: October 8, 1979 (age 46); Tehran, Iran
- Education: Soureh International University; Azad University
- Occupation: Actress
- Years active: 1991–present
- Spouse: Rambod Javan (m. 2008; div. 2014)

Sahar Dolatshahi (Persian: سحر دولتشاهی; born on October 8, 1979) is an Iranian actress. She is best known for her roles in Ice Age (2015), Istanbul Junction (2018), The Frog (2020–2021), I Want to Live (2021), and Viper of Tehran (2024). She has received various accolades, including two Crystal Simorghs and an Iran's Film Critics and Writers Association Award.

== Early life ==
Sahar Dolatshahi was born on October 8, 1979, in Tehran. From a young age, she held lifeguard and coaching certifications and often accompanied her mother to various competitions. She initially pursued studies in chemical engineering but later withdrew from the program. She is a graduate of Soureh International University with a degree in dramatic literature and holds a bachelor's degree in French translation from Azad University.

Family

Her mother serves as the vice-president of the Swimming Federation and is a faculty member at the Teacher Training University, while her father is a mechanical engineer. She has a sister, Nasim, and a brother, Rouzbeh. Rouzbeh is a graduate of Shahid Beheshti University and holds a master's degree in computational studies from Canada, while Nasim graduated from the University of Tehran and earned a PhD in archaeology in Berlin. The Dolatshahi family are descendants of the Qajar dynasty's Dolatshahi lineage.

== Career ==
Sahar Dolatshahi began her acting career in experimental theater at age 20. The following year, she made her television debut in Marzieh Boroumand's series Hodhod Bookstore. Over the years, she has collaborated with prominent stage directors including Hamid Emjad, Atila Pesyani, and Amir Reza Kouhestani and starred in the play Drought and Lies.

Her stage work in Les Misérables and Tren earned her nominations for Best Theater Actress, while her role in the film Gold and Copper secured a Best Supporting Actress nomination at the Cinema Critics' Celebration. Dolatshahi's most prolific period came between 2014 and 2015, during which she appeared in eight films.

Beyond her acting career, Dolatshahi hosted the television show Gap and worked as an interviewer on The Opinions of a Cinema Actor. She also narrated the programs Radio Seven and Da Book and served as a reporter for the documentary Notes of a Crowded City.

Cinema

During her first decade in cinema, Dolatshahi collaborated with some of Iran's most distinguished directors, including Abbas Kiarostami, Bahram Beyzai, Bahman Farmanara, Asghar Farhadi, and Masoud Kimiai. Her portrayal of Niloufar in Inversion earned significant praise from international critics and is widely considered one of her finest performances; she also attended the 69th Cannes Film Festival where the film was screened.

Another milestone in her career was her role as Asal in Ice Age, which secured her first Crystal Simorgh for Best Supporting Actress. Dolatshahi further demonstrated her versatility with her performances as Mehraneh Nouri in Cold Sweat though her moloudi recitation scene was ultimately cut from the final release and as Farangis, a pregnant woman speaking with a Gilaki dialect, in Istanbul Junction.

2000s

Dolatshahi made her cinematic debut with a brief, three-scene role in Asghar Farhadi's third feature film, Fireworks Wednesday, which became one of the most-watched releases of 2006. That same year, she appeared in Rasoul Mollagholipour's M for Mother alongside Golshifteh Farahani, Ali Shadman, Hossein Yari, and Jamshid Hashempour. She portrayed Farzaneh, a journalist who uses her profession to help her friend Sepideh (played by Farahani). The film went on to become the second most-watched release of the year.

In 2008, she worked with two other acclaimed directors, appearing in Abbas Kiarostami's Shirin and Bahram Beyzai's When We Are All Asleep, which were released in spring 2009 and January 2012, respectively.

Her performance as a head nurse in Homayoun Assadian's Gold and Copper earned her a nomination for Best Supporting Actress at the 14th House of Cinema Celebration. The film itself received six nominations at the 28th Fajr Film Festival including Best Film, Director, and Screenplay with co-star Negar Javaherian winning the Crystal Simorgh for Best Actress.

In 2010, Dolatshahi starred in Kamal Tabrizi's Earth Runner and Morteza Farshbaf's Sorrow (also known as Mourning). Both films faced censorship delays, eventually receiving limited releases in 2016 and 2017 to lukewarm domestic receptions. In Sorrow, which won four awards at the Busan, Deauville, and Tallinn Black Nights international film festivals, Dolatshahi provided voice acting alongside Peyman Maadi.

2010s

In 2012, Dolatshahi starred alongside Taraneh Alidoosti, Saber Abar, and Hamidreza Azarang in the critically acclaimed Shallow Yellow Sky, which won the Crystal Simorgh for Best Editing at the 31st Fajr Film Festival. The following year, she made a brief appearance in Masoud Kimiai's Metropol. Her first leading role came in Hossein Farahbakhsh's Mastaneh, starring alongside Milad Keymaram, Baran Kosari, Atila Pesyani, and Farhad Aslani, which was released on November 19, 2014.

Also in 2014, Dolatshahi appeared in Kiarash Asadizadeh's Fissure and Mostafa Kiayi's Ice Age. Released on July 3, 2014, Ice Age featured an ensemble cast including Bahram Radan, Mahtab Keramati, Farhad Aslani, Zhaleh Sameti, Mohsen Kiayi, and Anna Nemati, and earned seven nominations at the Fajr Film Festival. Dolatshahi's performance in the film won her the Crystal Simorgh for Best Supporting Actress. Upon receiving the award, she said:

"I hope this festival becomes a true celebration for the cinema family, where we reunite, enjoy watching films, and harbor fewer grievances toward one another."

In 2016, Dolatshahi had five films in release. Mostafa Kiayi's Barcode, which premiered on June 8, 2016, became one of the year's top-grossing films, starring Bahram Radan, Mohsen Kiayi, Bahareh Kianafshar, Reza Kianian, and Pejman Bazeghi. Her other releases that year included Iraj Karimi's Profiles, Rouhollah Hejazi's Death of a Fish, Kamal Tabrizi's Earth Runner, and Behnam Behzadi's Inversion. Her portrayal of the lead role in Inversion earned her a Best Actress nomination at the 36th Fajr Film Festival. Following its initial public screening at Mellat Cineplex on January 28, 2016, Inversion gained international acclaim, winning Best Film at Italy's MedFilm Festival and screening in the Un Certain Regard section at the Cannes Film Festival, as well as at festivals in Vancouver, Hamburg, Cambridge, Kerala, and Dubai.

In 2018, she appeared in Bahman Farmanara's I Wanna Dance, Mostafa Kiayi's Istanbul Junction, and Soheil Biraghi's Cold Sweat. Her performances in the latter two films earned her a second Crystal Simorgh for Best Supporting Actress at the 36th Fajr Film Festival. In Cold Sweat, she portrayed a strict supervisor, wearing a chador to establish a distinct character image. Regarding a censored moloudi scene in the film, the production team stated that they had agreed to its removal to secure a public release; however, a day before the premiere, the Art Bureau boycotted the film, resulting in the loss of nearly 100 of its 120 screening venues.

Her prominence at the 36th Fajr Film Festival driven by her roles in Cold Sweat, Istanbul Junction, and Nima Eghlima's Amir made her one of the event's most talked-about actors. For her portrayal of Rima, a psychologically troubled woman in Amir, she received a Special Mention for Best Actress at the 8th Iranian Film Festival Australia. Her other release around this period was Alireza Motamedi's Reza.

Dolatshahi closed out the decade with Niki Karimi's Turkish-language romantic drama Atabai, co-starring Hadi Hejazifar and Javad Ezzati, and Farnoush Samadi's Imaginary Line (produced by Ali Mosaffa), which premiered at the 39th Fajr Film Festival and went on to screen at over 25 international festivals. By the end of the 2010s, several of her projects remained unreleased, including Lobby, Ardent, Abdolreza Kahani's Nazanin, Bahareh, Tina, and Behrouz Afkhami's Son of the Morning.

In 2023, she received another Crystal Simorgh nomination for Best Actress for her leading role in Your Absence.

Television

Sahar Dolatshahi made her television debut in Marzieh Boroumand's series Hodhod Bookstore. Her subsequent television credits include Travelers, Unrewarded Suffering, Family Conspiracy, and Abpariya.

Among these, her portrayal of Nahid in the Rambod Javan's series Travelers remains one of her most significant television roles. In the series, she played an extraterrestrial agent struggling to comprehend human relationships and social dynamics on Earth.[1]

Home Entertainment (Streaming)*

Dolatshahi made her home entertainment debut as Samiyeh in the third season of Ice Heart, portraying a chaotic gang leader with a distinctive appearance. In December 2017, she played Zhân in the series His Excellency, followed by a role as Bita Niakan in the second season of Made in Iran.

In 2020, she starred as Faranak Bahrami in Houman Seyyedi's acclaimed streaming series Frog, alongside Navid Mohammadzadeh, Saber Abar, Fereshteh Hosseini, Anahita Afshar, and Mehran Ghafourian. Her performance earned her a nomination for Best Actress in a Drama Series at the Hafez Awards. The following year, she starred in Shahram Shah-Hosseini's 1980s-set drama I Want to Stay Alive. Her portrayal of the determined and sincere Homa Haghi opposite Hamed Behdad, Pedram Sharifi, Ali Shadman, and Anahita Dargahi received widespread praise, with the series also featuring a title track by Homayoun Shajarian. In 2024, she appeared in the series Dariush. Following the release of the seventh episode, which featured a dance-like scene between Dolatshahi and co-star Atash Taghipour, the judiciary announced legal action against her and the show's creators.

Theater

Dolatshahi's theater career began with student productions in the late 1990s, leading to her professional stage debut around 2000. Over nearly two decades, she performed in 30 plays and co-directed Stronger with Ayat Najafi. As a key member of Atila Pesyani's theater group, she collaborated closely with Fatemeh Naghavi, Setareh Pesyani, and Khosrow Pesyani.

Her notable stage credits include Reza Guran's The Long Winding Road and Mohammad Aghabati's A Woman from the Past. She replaced Rima Raminfar in the controversial production of Tren at the Tehran City Theater, earning a nomination for Best Actress at the 31st Fajr International Theater Festival. Her other performances include Arvind Dasht-Aray's Tintin and the Secret of Moundas Castle, Ali Nargesnejad's Lead House, and the highly successful concert-play C (or See) at Saadabad Palace, where she portrayed Rudabeh. In late 2018, she starred in the musical Les Misérables at the Espinas Palace Hotel, earning another Best Actress nomination. In July 2022, she was cast alongside Saber Abar and Elham Korda in Morteza Mir-Montazemi's planned production of Jean Genet's The Maids at Vahdat Hall.

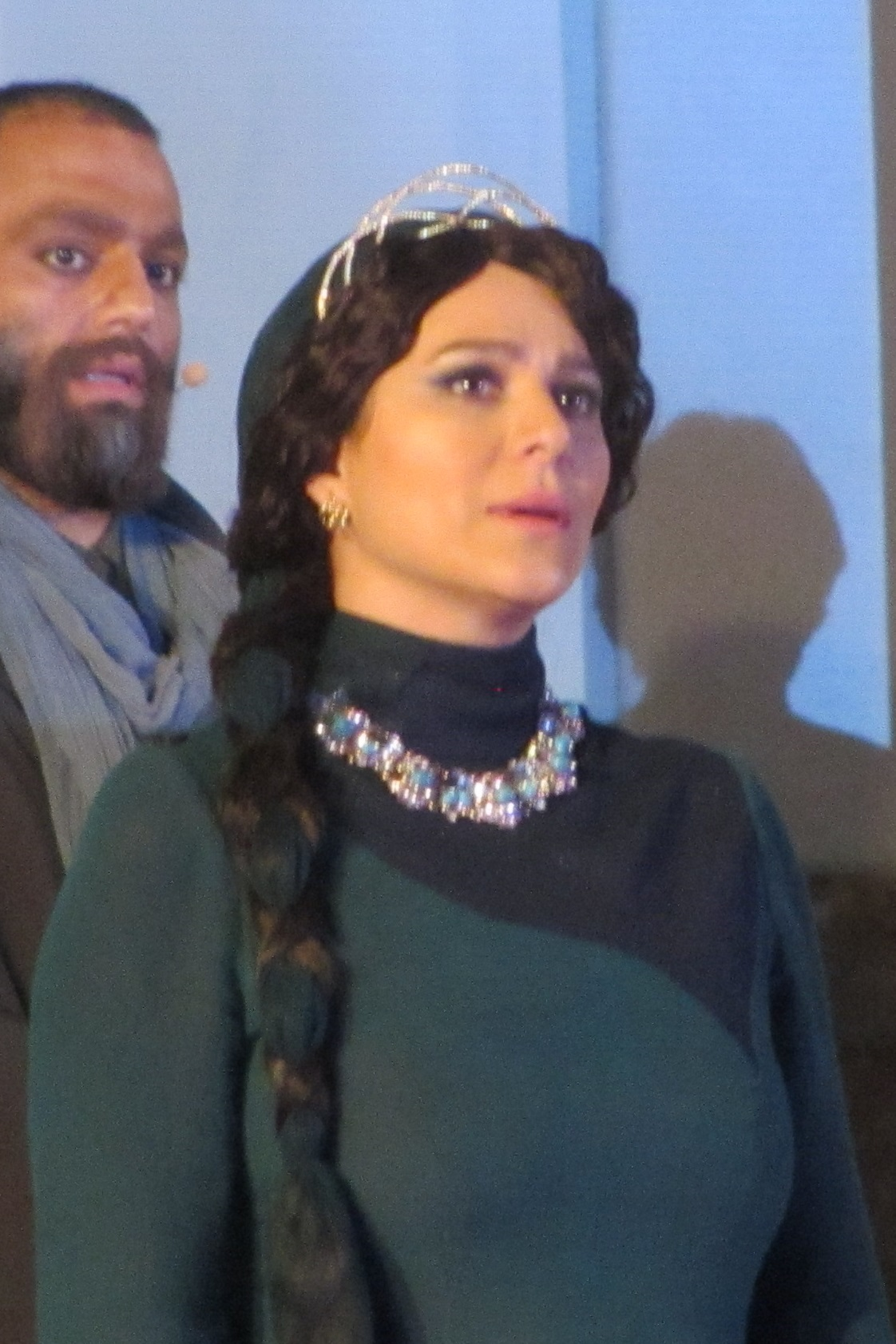
Sahar Dolatshahi and Saber Abar in a theatre

Dolatshahi and Atila Pesyani collaborated in seven plays as director and actor:

- Crow and Bicycle (2004)
- Bitter Like Honey (2004), staged at Theater City's Saya Hall
- Blade and Moon (2005), performed at Chaharsoo Hall, the third part of a trilogy following Dreamlike Sleep (2000) and Bitter Like Honey (2003), focusing on music and lighting in a 50-minute performance
- Stroke on Sand (2005), depicting 28 love stories through abstract, fragmented scenes
- Anato Blade (2005)
- A Discordant Symphony (2006), adapted from Mikhail Bulgakov's The Master and Margarita by the Bazi Theater Group
- The Devil's Ship (2007), exploring the lives of four women on an island disrupted by a mysterious ship

Voice Acting

At the 12th Iranian Cinema Critics' Celebration

Dolatshahi has lent her voice to the audiobook of My Lucky Gazelle by Mahmoud Dowlatabadi, Lady Deer by Maryam Hosseinian, and Asghar Farhadi's film The Past. She also performed a live reading of Casablanca.

Documentaries

Dolatshahi appeared in two documentaries: Notes of a Crowded City and Ibrahim in Fire. The 40-minute Notes of a Crowded City examines Tehran's urban society, observing diverse individuals from Railway Square to Tajrish, featuring Dolatshahi alongside Afshin Hashemi.

In Ibrahim in Fire, directed by Omid Bankdar and Keyvan Alimohammadi and produced by Nahid Delagah, she narrated the story of Ibrahim Asgharzadeh, a victim of Iran Airtour Flight 956. This 43-minute documentary, part of the One Film, One Truth series, won the Portrait Award at the Avini Festival.

Jury Member

In 2017, Dolatshahi was invited as a juror for the Dubai International Film Festival and served as a judge at the closing ceremony of the Australian Iranian Film Festival, an independent cultural event organized by Daricheh Cinema Institute.

In 2024, she was a main juror at Russia's Kinobravo Festival.

== Other activities ==
In November 2015, Dolatshahi attended a seminar on the role of psychological factors in diabetes management at the Ministry of Interior's Hall, receiving blue bracelets from the Iran Diabetes Association to serve as an ambassador for raising awareness about diabetes. She joined other actors in a campaign to promote diabetes education. On her Instagram, Dolatshahi shared a photo, writing: "Valeh Boys' Primary School. Hoping for a day when fewer people suffer from diabetes."

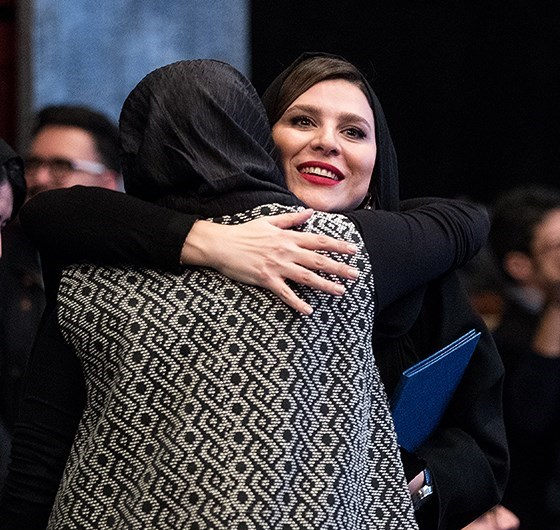
Sahar Dolatshahi At the 12th Iranian Cinema Critics Festival

In 2016, during a meeting with the Deputy for Women and Family Affairs of the Presidency, she was appointed as an ambassador for the *Armaghan* campaign, aimed at raising awareness and supporting families of women imprisoned for non-intentional crimes. On the International Day for the Elimination of Violence Against Women, she published a statement addressing violence against women.

== Personal life ==
On March 17, 2009, Dolatshahi married Rambod Javan, whom she met through theater, but the couple divorced in 2014. On October 8, 2022, news of the temporary seizure of passports belonging to Ali Daei, Homayoun Shajarian, and Dolatshahi upon their return to Iran at Imam Khomeini International Airport garnered significant media attention. In October 2023, Homayoun Shajarian confirmed in an interview with Adel Ferdosipour that he and Dolatshahi are in a romantic relationship. Dolatshahi boycotted the Fajr International Film Festival in protest of the government's crackdown of the 2025–2026 Iranian protests.

== Filmography ==
=== Film ===
Year	Title	Role	Director	Notes	Ref(s)
2006	Fireworks Wednesday	Mozhdeh's sister	Asghar Farhadi		
2006	M for Mother	Farzaneh	Rasoul Mollagholipour		
2008	Shirin	Woman in audience	Abbas Kiarostami		
2009	When We Are All Asleep	Kamand	Bahram Beyzai		
2010	Gold and Copper	Nurse	Homayoon As'adian		
2010	The Earth Marathon	Bahar Malekshahi	Kamal Tabrizi		
2011	The Son of Dawn	Khomeini's mom	Behrouz Afkhami		
2011	Mourning	Nahid	Morteza Farshbaf		
2013	The Shallow Yellow Sky	Sara	Bahram Tavakoli		
2014	Metropole	Khosrow's sister	Masoud Kimiai		
2014	Mastaneh	Mastaneh	Hossein Farahbakhsh		
2015	Gap	Nasim	Kiarash Asadizadeh		
2015	Ice Age	Asal	Mostafa Kiaee		
2015	Death of the Fish	Mahnaz	Rouhollah Hejazi		
2015	Twenty Weeks	Arghavan	Masoud Gharagozlu		
2016	Profiles	Zhila	Iraj Karimi		
2016	Inversion	Niloofar	Behnam Behzadi		
2016	Barcode	Nazi	Mostafa Kiaee		
2016	Lobby		Mohamad Parvizi	Unreleased film	
2016	Delighted	Mahsa	Abdolreza Kahani		
2017	I Want to Dance	Patient	Bahman Farmanara	Cameo	
2018	Reza	Fati	Alireza Motamedi		
2018	Istanbul Junction	Farangis	Mostafa Kiaee		
2018	Cold Sweat	Mehraneh	Soheil Beiraghi		
2018	Amir	Rima	Nima Eghlima		
2020	Atabai	Sima	Niki Karimi		
2020	180° Rule	Sara	Farnoosh Samadi		
2023	A Relic of the South	Hara	Hossein Amiri Doomari, Pedram Pouramiri		
2024	When You Were Not Here	Marzieh	Kaveh Sajjadi Hosseini		
2024	Go Free	Niloofar	Adel Tabrizi		

=== Web ===
Year	Title	Role	Director	Platform	Ref(s)
2012	Icy Heart 3	Samie	Saman Moghadam	Video CD	
2017	The Excellency	Janet Anahita Nuremberg	Sam Gharibian	Video CD	
2018	Made in Iran 2	Bita Niakan	Borzou Niknejad	Video CD	
2020–2021	The Frog	Faranak Bahrami	Houman Seyyedi	Namava	
2021	I Want to Live	Homa Haghi	Sharam Shah Hosseini	Filimo	
2023	Vertigo	Therapist (voice)	Behrang Tofighi	Namava	
2024	Viper of Tehran	Mojgan Moshtagh	Saman Moghaddam	Filmnet	
2024	Dariush	Saghi	Hadi Hejazifar	Filmnet	
TBA	1001 Nights		Mostafa Kiaee	Filimo	

=== Television ===
Year	Title	Role	Director	Network	Notes
2006	Hod Hod Bookstore	Niloofar Nili	Marzieh Boroumand	IRIB TV3	TV series
2007	Forgetfulness		Masoud Madadi		TV film
2007	Outcast		Mehdi Karimpour		TV film
2009	The Passengers	Nahid Keyhani	Rambod Javan	IRIB TV3	TV series
2009	A Name		Bijan Mirbagheri		TV film
2009	Amnesia	Azar	Masoud Madadi		TV film
2010	No Pain, No Gain	Marzieh	Alireza Bazrafshan	IRIB TV3	TV series
2010	Radio 7	The Narrator	Mansour Zabetian	IRIB Amoozesh	TV program
2011	The Family Conspiracy	Ladan Rahmani	Rambod Javan	IRIB TV1	TV series
2011	The Da Book	The Narrator	Sina Ataeian Dena		TV program
2011	GAP	The Executor	Rambod Javan	IFilm	TV program
2012	Ab Paria	Samira	Marzieh Boroumand	IRIB TV2	TV series
2013	A Few More Days	Ghazal Sadr	Parisa Gorgin		TV film
2015	Red Hat 94	Herself	Iraj Tahmasb	IRIB TV2	TV program
2018	Get Together	Herself	Mehran Modiri	IRIB Nasim	TV program

=== Other works ===
Year	Title	Role	Director	Notes	Ref.
2008	The Busy City Notes	Reporter	Babak Goudarzi Nejad	Documentary	
2012	Ibrahim In The Fire	Narrator	Keyvan Alimohammadi, Omid Bonakdar	Documentary	
2013	Opinions of A Cinema Actor		Manijeh Hekmat	Program	
2015	Gozal, The Gazelle of My Fortune		Mani Haghighi	Audio book; author: Mahmoud Dowlatabadi	
2021	Deer Lady			Audio book; author: Maryam Hosseinian	

== Theatre ==
Year	Title	Playwright	Director	Stage
2001	Sleepy Midday		Ayat Najafi	
2001	Seagull		Ayat Najafi	
2002	Stronger		Ayat Najafi, Sahar Dolatshahi	
2002	Miss Julie		Ayat Najafi	
2003	The Pilgrim		Hamid Amjad	
2004	News from Tehran 2		Ayat Najafi	
2004	Recent Experiences		Amir Reza Kouhestani	
2004	The Crow and The Bike		Atila Pesyani	
2004	No Milk No Sugar		Hamid Amjad	
2004	Hey Big Man, Don't cry		Jalal Tehrani	
2004	Bitter like Honey		Atila Pesyani	
2006	The Razor and The Moon		Atila Pesyani	
2006	Pick on Geomancy		Atila Pesyani	
2007	Anato Blade		Atila Pesyani	
2007	A Tuneless Symphony		Atila Pesyani	
2008	Devil's Ship		Atila Pesyani	
2011	A Woman from The Past		Mohamad Aghebati	
2011	The Footnote		Ahmad Kache Chian	
2011	The Dracula		Setareh Pesyani	
2012	Long Spiral Road		Setareh Pesyani	City Theater of Tehran - Chaharso Hall
2012	Tran		Nima Dehghan	City Theater of Tehran
2012	Tintin And The Secret Of Moundas Castle		Arvand Dashtaray	Iranshahr Theater
2013	From Jerusalem to Jericho		Bita Elhamian	Hafez Hall
2013	Lead House		Ali Narges Nejad	City Theater of Tehran
2013	Old Songs		Mohamad Rahmanian	Eko Diplomatic Conference Hall
2014	Drought and Lies		Mohamad Yaghoubi	Iranshahr Theater
2014	Gathering of Shakespeare's Women		Bahareh Rahnama	Iranshahr Theater
2014	Death of Hutan		Yousef Bapiri	Paliz Theater
2017	Si - A Multimedia Concert and Performance		Asghar Dashti	Sa'dabad Complex
2018	Les Misérables	Victor Hugo	Hossein Parsaee	Tehran Royal Hall
2022	The Maids	Jean Genet	Morteza Mirmontazemi	Vahdat Hall

== Awards and nominations ==
Name of the award ceremony, year presented, category, nominee of the award, and the result of the nomination
Award	Year	Category	Nominated Work	Result	Ref.
Beirut International Women Film Festival	2021	Best International Ensemble Cast	180° Rule	Won	
Fajr Film Festival	2015	Best Actress in a Supporting Role	Ice Age	Won	
Fajr Film Festival	2018	Best Actress in a Supporting Role	Istanbul Junction and Cold Sweat	Won	
Fajr Film Festival	2023	Best Actress in a Supporting Role	A Relic of the South	Nominated	
Fajr Film Festival	2024	Best Actress in a Leading Role	When You Were Not Here	Nominated	
Hafez Awards	2016	Best Actress – Motion Picture	Ice Age and Gap	Nominated	
Hafez Awards	2017	Best Actress – Motion Picture	Inversion	Nominated	
Hafez Awards	2019	Best Actress – Motion Picture	Cold Sweat	Nominated	
Hafez Awards	2020	Best Actress – Motion Picture	Amir	Nominated	
Hafez Awards	2021	Best Actress – Television Series Drama	The Frog	Nominated	
Hafez Awards	2022	Best Actress – Theatre	Les Misérables	Nominated	
Iran Cinema Celebration	2006	Best Actress in a Supporting Role	M for Mother	Nominated	
Iran Cinema Celebration	2010	Best Actress in a Supporting Role	Gold and Copper	Nominated	
Iran Cinema Celebration	2016	Best Actress in a Supporting Role	Gap	Nominated	
Iran's Film Critics and Writers Association	2013	Best Actress in a Supporting Role	The Shallow Yellow Sky	Nominated	
Iran's Film Critics and Writers Association	2015	Best Actress in a Supporting Role	Ice Age	Honorary Diploma	
Iran's Film Critics and Writers Association	2015	Best Actress in a Supporting Role	Gap	Nominated	
Iran's Film Critics and Writers Association	2016	Best Actress in a Leading Role	Inversion	Nominated	
Iran's Film Critics and Writers Association	2018	Best Actress in a Leading Role	Amir	Nominated	
Iran's Film Critics and Writers Association	2018	Best Actress in a Supporting Role	Cold Sweat	Won	
Urban International Film Festival	2019	Best Actress	Istanbul Junction	Nominated	
