= Amir Jadidi =

Iranian actor (born 1984)

- امیر جدیدی
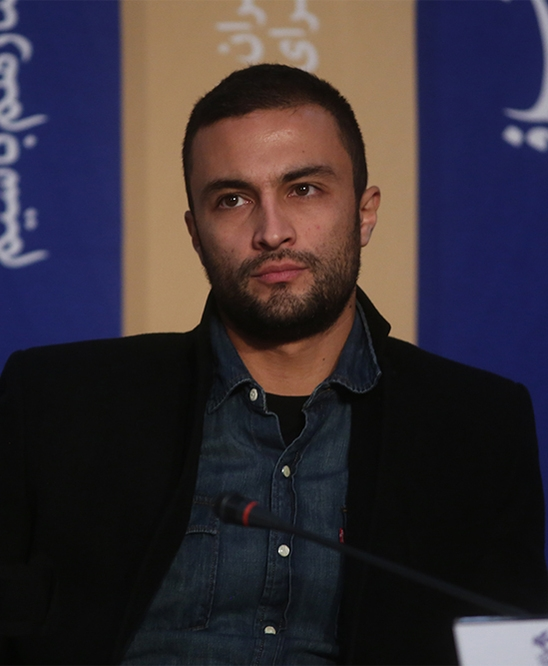
- Jadidi at the 2020 Fajr Film Festival
- Born: June 21, 1984 (age 42); Tehran, Iran
- Education: Azad University (MBA)
- Occupation: Actor
- Years active: 2010–present
- Website: Official website

Amir Jadidi (Persian: امیر جدیدی; born June 21, 1984) is an Iranian actor and tennis player. He is well known in Iran for his starring roles in Crazy Rook (2015), A Dragon Arrives! (2016), The Lost Strait (2018), Cold Sweat (2018) and Day Zero (2020), whereas he is best known internationally for his role as Rahim in A Hero (2021), which won the Grand Prix at the 74th Cannes Film Festival. Jadidi received a Palm Springs International Film Festival award for his performance in A Hero.

== Early life ==
Jadidi got his bachelor in Industrial Engineering and was graduated from Azad University in MBA.

== Career ==
=== 2010–2014: Career beginnings ===
Jadidi debuted as an Actor in 2011 with Houman Seyedi's Africa, as a young criminal with his friends who are ordered to keep a girl inside a house until her brother pays his debts. The film was praised for its new different style and performances.

In 2014, he starred in Thirteen and End of the Service films, for which he earned an Honorary Diploma for Best Actor in a Leading Role at the 32nd Fajr International Film Festival and received praise from critics for his performances.

=== 2015: Crazy Rook ===
Jadidi became known when he played Pirouz, the main character in the 2015 thriller drama Crazy Rook. The film was highly praised by critics and the audience at the 33rd Fajr Film Festival and won both Best Film and Audience Choice of Best Film, making it one of only five films in The history of cinema of Iran to win the latter (the other four are The Glass Agency, Low Heights, In Amethyst Color and Midday Adventures).

=== 2016–2017: Rising popularity and breakthrough ===
In 2016, he starred in four films, In Atousa's Laughter he acted alongside Baran Kosari, Pejman Bazeghi and Mohammad Reza Foroutan.

Jadidi's performance in Soheil Beiraghi's I (2016) grabbed the industry's attention and received critical acclaim. He earned his first Crystal Simorgh, Hafez Award and Iran's Film Critics and Writers Association nominations for his acting.

His third 2016 film A Dragon Arrives! was selected to compete for the Golden Bear at the 66th Berlin International Film Festival and received generally favorable reviews.

In Phenomenon, his last 2016 film he starred alongside Hedieh Tehrani. The film was directed by the controversial director Ali Ahmadzadeh and it's still unreleased.

In 2017 he acted in Masoud Kimiai's Domestic Killer alongside Parviz Parastui, Parviz Poorhosseini, Hamid Reza Azarang and Pegah Ahangarani. He earned his second Hafez Award nomination for his performance.

=== 2018–2020: Wide recognition ===
In 2018 he starred in Bahram Tavakoli's The Lost Strait, Soheil Beiraghi's Cold Sweat and Ramtin Lavafipour's Hat-trick.

He won the Crystal Simorgh for Best Actor for his performances in Cold Sweat and The Lost Strait. Jadidi earned Hafez Award, Iran's Film Critics and Writers Association and Iran Cinema Celebration nominations for his performance as Yaser Shah Hosseini in Cold Sweat. He also received an Iran's Film Critics and Writers Association nomination for his role in The Lost Strait.

In 2019 he played his first comedy film in Rambod Javan's Murphy's Law alongside Amir Jafari. The film received mixed reviews from critics but was a commercial success.

He starred in Saeid Malekan's directional debut Day Zero (2020) and earned his third Crystal Simorgh nomination. Jadidi played a security officer who is involved in the arresting of the infamous terrorist Abdolmalek Rigi.

He received his first theater acting award in 2020 at the 38th Fajr Theater Festival for his performance in Herring (2019), which he also produced.

=== 2021: Acclaim and worldwide recognition through A Hero ===
In 2021, he starred in Asghar Farhadi's universally acclaimed film A Hero which was selected to compete for the Palme d'Or At the 2021 Cannes Film Festival. The film won the Grand Prix and also was selected as the Iranian entry for the Best International Feature Film at the 94th Academy Awards but was not nominated. The film garnered Jadidi international recognition and earned him his first Hafez Award and Palm Springs International Film Festival award in addition to nomination for Best Performance by an Actor at the 14th Asia Pacific Screen Awards. Jadidi's performance as a single father was highly praised by critics and brought him wide recognition.

=== 2022–present: Play directing ===
In 2022 he directed and also played in the 300 play on the Sa'dabad Complex stage alongside Ali Nassirian, Javad Ezzati and Tannaz Tabatabaei.

In June 2022, he was invited to be a member of Academy of Motion Picture Arts and Sciences.

== Personal life ==
On 2 February 2026, Jadidi was not present for the screening of Escort at the Fajr Film Festival, a movie in which he acted in, leading to speculations that he had boycotted the festival in protest of the government's handling of the 2025–2026 Iranian protests.

== Filmography ==
=== Film ===
Year	Title	Role	Director	Notes	Ref(s)
2011	Africa	Kasra	Houman Seyyedi		
2013	Ring		Jamal Seyyed Hatami	Television film	
2013	Before Sunrise	Saman	Tahmineh Bahram Alian	Short film	
2014	Thirteen	Arash	Houman Seyyedi		
2014	End of the Service	Pouria Ghezelbash	Hamid Zargarnezhad		
2015	Crazy Rook	Pirouz Kianpour	Abolhassan Davoudi		
2015	Koshk	Traveller	Abdollah AlKaabi	Short film	
2016	Atousa's Laughter	Behzad	Alireza Farid		
2016	I	Aria	Soheil Beiraghi		
2016	A Dragon Arrives!	Babak Hafizi	Mani Haghighi		
2016	Phenomenon		Ali Ahmadzadeh	Unreleased film	
2017	Domestic Killer	Siavash	Masoud Kimiai		
2018	The Lost Strait	Hassan	Bahram Tavakoli		
2018	Cold Sweat	Yaser Shah Hosseini	Soheil Beiraghi		
2018	Hattrick	Farzad	Ramtin Lavafipour		
2019	Murphy's Law	Farrokh	Rambod Javan		
2020	Day Zero	Reza / Siavash	Saeed Malekan		
2020	Latyan	Taha	Ali Teymoori		
2021	A Hero	Rahim Soltani	Asghar Farhadi		
2025	Outcry	Bebin	Soheil Beiraghi		
2026	Escort		Yousef Hatamikia		
TBA	Mansour	Mansour Bahrami	Romuald Boulanger		
TBA	The Howl		Omid Shams		

=== Web ===
Year	Title	Role	Director	Platform	Notes	Ref(s)
TBA	Dash Akol	Dash Akol	Hamid Nematollah		Leading role	

=== Music video ===
Year	Title	Artist
2014	Why Did You Leave Me?	Homayoun Shajarian

== Theatre ==
Year	Title	Playwright	Director	Stage	Notes
2012	An Unfinished Narration of an Adjourned Season	Houman Seyyedi	Houman Seyyedi	Hafez Hall	
2015	Caligula	Albert Camus	Homayoun Ghanizadeh	Vahdat Hall	
2016	The Soprano	Sahra Fathi, Mehdi Koushki	Sahra Fathi, Mehdi Koushki	Independent Theater of Tehran	
2019	Herring	Ahmad Solgi, Reza Baharvand	Reza Baharvand	Shahrzad Theater	Also as producer
2022	300	Sohrab Pournazeri	Amir Jadidi	Sa'dabad Complex	

== Awards and nominations ==
Award	Year	Category	Nominated Work	Result
Asia Pacific Screen Awards	2021	Best Performance by an Actor	A Hero	Nominated
Fajr Film Festival	2016	Best Actor in a Supporting Role	I	Nominated
Fajr Film Festival	2018	Best Actor in a Leading Role	Cold Sweat and The Lost Strait	Won
Fajr Film Festival	2020	Best Actor in a Leading Role	Day Zero	Nominated
Fajr International Film Festival	2014	Best Actor in a Leading Role	Thirteen and End of the Service	Honorary Diploma
Fajr Theater Festival	2020	Best Actor	Herring	Won
Hafez Awards	2017	Best Actor – Motion Picture	I	Nominated
Hafez Awards	2018	Best Actor – Motion Picture	Domestic Killer	Nominated
Hafez Awards	2019	Best Actor – Motion Picture	Cold Sweat	Nominated
Hafez Awards	2021	Best Actor – Motion Picture	A Hero	Won
Iran Cinema Celebration	2019	Best Actor in a Leading Role	Cold Sweat	Nominated
Iran's Film Critics and Writers Association	2016	Best Actor in a Supporting Role	I	Nominated
Iran's Film Critics and Writers Association	2018	Best Actor in a Supporting Role	The Lost Strait	Nominated
Iran's Film Critics and Writers Association	2018	Best Actor in a Leading Role	Cold Sweat	Nominated
Malaysia International Film Festival	2019	Best Actor	Hat-trick	Nominated
Palm Springs International Film Festival	2022	FIPRESCI Prize for Best Actor in an International Feature Film	A Hero	Won
