= Soheil Beiraghi =

Iranian film director (born 1986)

- سهیل بیرقی
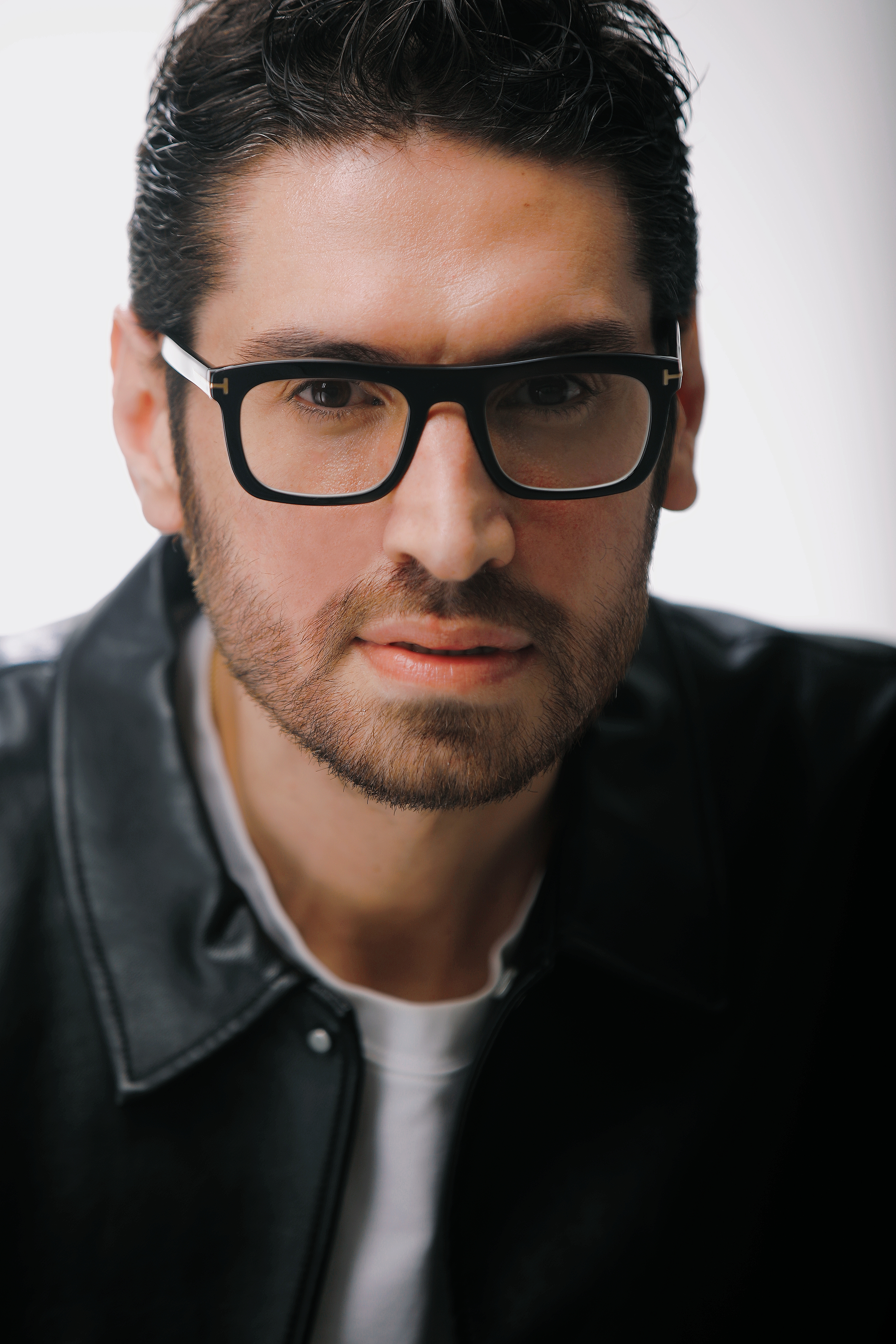
- Beiraghi at the 38th Fajr Film Festival (2020)
- Born: 16 October 1986 (age 39); Shahreza, Iran
- Occupations: Film Director; Screenwriter; Producer
- Years active: 2005–present

Signature
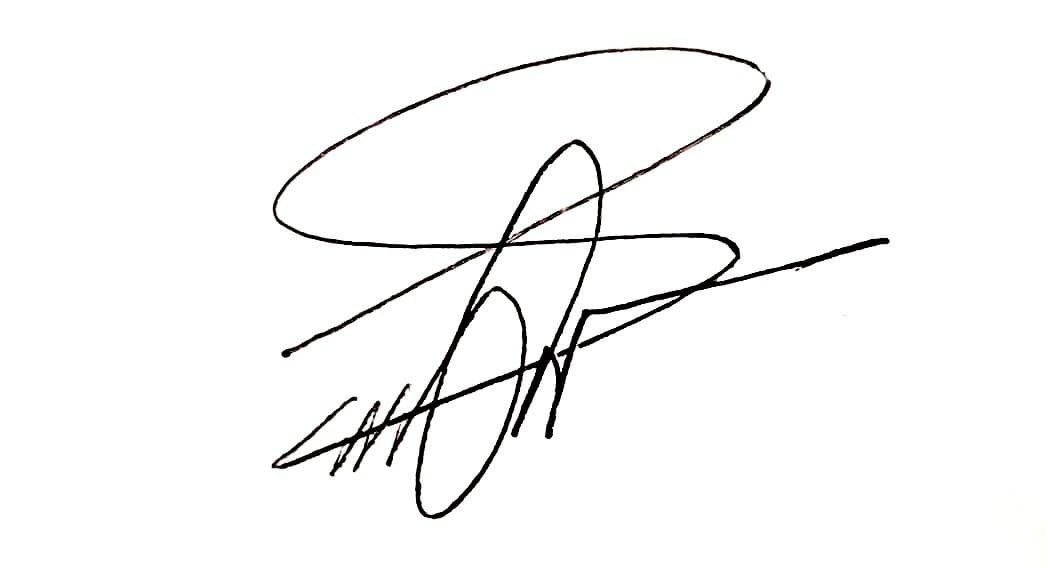

Soheil Beiraghi (Persian: سهیل بیرقی; born October 16, 1986, in Shahreza, Iran) is an Iranian independent film director, screenwriter and producer. He has directed the award-winning films I (Me), Cold Sweat and Popular . He started out on his filmmaking career in 2005 as an assistant director in a number of cinematic productions. His ten-year experience of working as an assistant director and planner, paved the way for the making of his first feature film I (Me). Beiraghi has also a record on play writing and theater directing.

== Biography ==
Soheil Beiraghi was born on October 16, 1986, in Shahreza. He got involved in cultural and artistic activities at the age of 12, writing short stories and texts on different subjects for magazines and newspapers. Three years later, one of his short stories was published for the first time in the monthly art and culture magazine Haft (seven) which received special attention. When he was 16, he made his feature debut as a screenwriter, a script that satisfied some of the professional and acclaimed filmmakers of the time. However, as he yearned to be an independent creator, he left the screenplay unfinished and set about making films based on his own writings and short stories. At the age of 18, inspired by one of his fictions, Beiraghi made his first short film.

His love of cinema grew deeper to such an extent that in 2005 he gave up his studies in industrial engineering and dedicated himself to filmmaking, working as an assistant director and planner for the following 10 years. During the course of the decade he had the opportunity to collaborate with prominent filmmakers such as Varuzh Karim-Masihi, Rasool Sadr Ameli, Hassan Fathi, Abdolreza Kahani and Bahram Tavakoli.

In 2012 his career took a new turn as he opted for the theater. He wrote and directed Pit (Persian: Chaleh) acted by Andishe Fouladvand, Ammaar Tafti and Atefe Nouri. The play had been on stage for 45 days in the Time Museum’s performance hall in Tehran and was performed in the theaters of different cities both in Iran and abroad.

== Opinions ==
Soheil Beiraghi is among the few Iranian filmmakers who work independently of any institutions. His main characters are lonely women who fight for their goals and undeniable human rights without the support of any organization or social entity.

To follow the path to success, the protagonists of the film come face to face with other people and the dominant system. The female protagonists’ daring encounters with unfavorable circumstances constitute a recurrent theme in Beiraghi's works.

There is, in addition, another noteworthy theme in Beiraghi's films; he addresses the question of power as well. His characters’ free will play an essential role in their decision-making. Nevertheless, they tend to use this unbridled power to the detriment of one another. Moreover, they don't take a passive role in dealing with difficulties and people; on the contrary, they make every effort to reclaim their rights, no matter what the consequences would be.

Beiraghi has been labelled as a feminist film director by the followers of the antifeminist ideology, given that the protagonists of his films are mainly women and the plots include different aspects of women's lives. Adherents of the feminist movement regard his films as misogynistic, since another recurrent theme highlighted in his narratives is women taking action against each other. He has said about this:

Beiraghi has said in this regard, “I have no intention of making films in favour of women, nor am I adherent to any particular movement or school of thought. I have never made films for or against women. I don’t mean to praise one social class and damage the image of another. The ideas come to my mind from the present time circumstances. If a viewer gets the impression that this film has destroyed the picture of a given class of the society, it’s up to him or her to judge. I only meant to be an honest storyteller.”

The combination of common elements such as similar themes, minimal style of directing, sub-plot based screenplays as well as breaking with classic rules has made a trilogy of his three drama films which are described as feminine film noirs.

However, Beiraghi has stated that the trilogy took form all by itself, without any previous planning. The three films happened to be related to each other all spontaneously.

The same as the protagonists, the events of the three narratives move on against the current of the prevalent filmmaking principles, in the opposite direction of the existing cinematic and storytelling techniques. The films have been able to attract a huge audience, but at the same time have aroused the interest of a select few, being largely discussed by them. They inject new ideas into the main framework of today's Iranian cinema.

== Directing Works ==
=== I (Me) (2016) ===
Beiraghi made his first feature film I (also known as Me) in 2016, when he was 28 years old. The film was a great success as the young director's first professional experience, both on cinema screens and at film festivals. Just inside Iran, the box office was more than twice higher than budget.

The distinctive appearance of the actress Leila Hatami won praise from a large number of audiences and critics alike. She played the role of an astute fixer who solved problems for other people by breaking the law in a subtle way. The novelty of the script and the narrative structure which was made up of subplots were the features particularly acclaimed by the critics who applauded as well the director's fresh look at a social problem and his ability to guide the actors, especially the female character.

Amir Jadidi, Mani Haghighi and Behnoush Bakhtiari were the film's supporting actors.

=== Cold Sweat (Permission) (2018) ===
Beiraghi made his second feature film, Cold Sweat in 2018. The film narrates the story of a young woman by the name of Afrooz Ardestani, the Iran women's national football team captain whose husband doesn't allow her to play in international football games and forbids her from going abroad.

The film's central theme is this woman's struggle for her fundamental rights, a lead role played by Baran Kosari which attracted a lot of public and media attention. The striking similarity between the plot and the reality about Iranian female athletes, prevented from taking part in international competitions by their husbands, provoked fierce debate.

Amir Jadidi, Leili Rashidi, Hoda Zeinolabedin and Sahar Dowlatshahi were also cast in Cold Sweat.

The film was chosen for best actress and best actor in Fajr International Film Festival.

=== Popular (2020) ===
Two years later, in 2020, Beiraghi began shooting his third feature film Popular, a threequel to his two previous works I (Me) and Cold Sweat, all dealing with women's issues. Preceded by Leila Hatami and Baran Kosari featuring as two Iranian women in the 1970s and 1980s, the actress Fatemeh Motamed-Arya appeared in Popular as the representative of the women born in the 1960s in Iran. It's about a middle-aged woman frustrated by long hours of idleness and boredom who decides to start a new life in a small town after going through a divorce.

Gaining social acceptance and following traditions despite oneself are the dominant themes of the film. It has a simple and minimal language and takes the audience on a journey through the details of a realistic narrative. Motamed-Arya's acting in the leading role and the way Beiraghi brings her as the lead character face to face with her lengthy loneliness and everyday problems attracted considerable interest from the critics after the screening of the film at the Fajr Film Festival.

Baran Kosari and Hootan Shakiba played the supporting roles in Popular.

The movie's public screening has been postponed indefinitely due to COVID-19 restrictions.

== Filmography ==
Title	Year	Producer	Screenwriter	Director	Genre
I (Me)	2016	Saeid Saadi, Saeid Khani	✔	✔	Social drama
Cold Sweat	2018	Mehdi Davari	✔	✔	Sports and social drama
Unpopular	2020	✔	✔	✔	Social drama
Bidad	2025	✔	✔	✔	Social drama

== Awards and nominations ==
=== National ===
Year	Festival	Film	Competition	Result	Notes
2015	24th Fajr International Film Festival	I (Me)	Negah-e-No (Best Film); Soday-e-Simorgh competitive section		Nominated in two more categories: Best Supporting Actor (Amir Jadidi), Best Supporting Actress (Behnoosh Bakhtiari)
2015	10th Iran's Film Critics and Writers Association Award Ceremony	I (Me)	Creativity & Talent Prize	Nominated	Nominated in three more categories: Best Actress (Leila Hatami), Best Supporting Actor (Amir Jadidi), Best Supporting Actress (Behnoosh Bakhtiari)
2016	Cinema Gazette Award Ceremony	I (Me)	Directing	Nominated	Award winner for Best Actress
2016	Cinema Gazette Award Ceremony	I (Me)	Screenwriting	Nominated	Award winner for Best Actress
2017	19th Iranian Cinema Award Ceremony (House of Cinema)	I (Me)	Best Script	Nominated	Nominated in three more categories: Best Supporting Actress (Behnoosh Bakhtiari), Best Sound Recording (Nasser Entezari), Best Sound Mixing (Alireza Alavian)
2017	36th Fajr International Film Festival	Cold Sweat	Soday-e-Simorgh competition section	Nominated	Nominated for eight awards; winner in three categories: Best actor (Amir Jadidi), Best Supporting Actress (Sahar Dolatshahi), Best Film Editing (Bahram Dehghani & Mohammad Najarian); the film's nominations in five other categories are: Best Actress (Baran Kossari), Best Supporting Actor (Leili Rashidi), Best Supporting Actor (Hoda Zeinolabedin), Best Cinematography (Farshad Mohammadi), Best Original Score (Karen Homayounfar)
2018	12th Iran's Film Critics and Writers Association Award Ceremony	Cold Sweat	Best Film	Nominated	Sahar Dolatshahi won Best Supporting Actress award and Baran Kosari received the Diploma of Honour for Best Actress. The Film garnered nominations in the following categories: Best Actor (Amir Jadidi), Best Supporting Actress (Leili Rashidi), Best Supporting Actress (Hoda Zeinolabedin), Best Film Editing (Bahram Dehghani & Mohammad Najarian)
2018	12th Iran's Film Critics and Writers Association Award Ceremony	Cold Sweat	Best Directing	Nominated	Sahar Dolatshahi won Best Supporting Actress award and Baran Kosari received the Diploma of Honour for Best Actress. The Film garnered nominations in the following categories: Best Actor (Amir Jadidi), Best Supporting Actress (Leili Rashidi), Best Supporting Actress (Hoda Zeinolabedin), Best Film Editing (Bahram Dehghani & Mohammad Najarian)
2018	12th Iran's Film Critics and Writers Association Award Ceremony	Cold Sweat	Best Screenplay	Nominated	Sahar Dolatshahi won Best Supporting Actress award and Baran Kosari received the Diploma of Honour for Best Actress. The Film garnered nominations in the following categories: Best Actor (Amir Jadidi), Best Supporting Actress (Leili Rashidi), Best Supporting Actress (Hoda Zeinolabedin), Best Film Editing (Bahram Dehghani & Mohammad Najarian)
2019	21st House of Cinema Award Ceremony	Cold Sweat			Nominated in four categories: Best Actress (Baran Kosari), Best Actor (Amir Jadidi), Best Supporting Actress (Sahar Dolatshahi), Best Supporting Actress (Leili Rashidi)
2019	38th Fajr Film Festival	Popular	Soday-e-Simorgh competitive section		Nominated for Best Supporting Actress (Baran Kosari)
2020	19th Hafez Film Festival	Cold Sweat	Best Film	Nominated	Baran Kosari won the award for Best Actress, Amir Jadidi won the award for Best Actor and Sahar Dolatshahi was nominated for Best Supporting Actress award
2020	19th Hafez Film Festival	Cold Sweat	Best Screenplay	Nominated	Baran Kosari won the award for Best Actress, Amir Jadidi won the award for Best Actor and Sahar Dolatshahi was nominated for Best Supporting Actress award

=== International ===
==== I (Me) ====
Festival (cinema/venue)	Country	Date	Notes
Fajr International Film Festival	Tehran, Iran	1-11 February 2016	Domestic release; Winner - Best Supporting Actor Amir Jadidi and Best Supporting Actress Behnoosh Bakhtiari
20th Tallinn Black Nights Film Festival (PÖFF)	Estonia	11- 27 November 2016	Forum section
6th Iranian Film Festival	Prague, Czech Republic	10- 21 January 2017	Competition section
7th London Iranian Film Festival	United Kingdom	Oct 28th - Nov 7th 2016	
Museum of Fine Arts, Houston	United States	20- 22 January 2017	
Museum of Fine Arts, Boston	United States	26 & 28 January 2017	
6th Iranian Film Festival	Australia	Oct 20th - Nov 13th 2016	
Iranian Film Festival	Zurich, Swiss	May 2017	
Smithsonian Institution	Washington, US	Feb ‌‌‌11th 2017	
Gene Siskel Film Center	Chicago, US	Feb 4th and 5th 2017	
Persian Cine Club	Geneva, Swiss	May 2017	
China National Film Museum	Beijing, China	23 – 29 August 2017	
15th Pune International Film Festival (PIFF)	India	12 - 19 January 2017	
Guwahati International Film Festival	India	Oct 28th - Nov 2nd 2017	

==== Cold Sweat ====
Cold Sweat was distributed in France by Sophie Dulac Distribution and was screened in England, Ireland, Sweden, South America, Australia, New Zealand, China, and Malaysia. It was also well received at a number of international film festivals.

Festival (cinema/venue)	Country	Date	Notes
Fajr International Film Festival	Tehran, Iran	1–11 February 2018	Domestic release; Winner - Best Actor Amir Jadidi, Best Supporting Actress Sahar Dolatshahi, Best Film Editing (Bahram Dehghani & Mohammad Najarian); all the main and supporting cast were nominated for their performance including Baran Kosari, Amir Jadid, Sahar Dolatshahi, Leili Rashidi and Hoda Zeinolabedin.
Carcassonne International Film Festival	France	December 2018	Winner- Grand Prize Award, Audience Award received by Baran Kosari for Best Actress
Dublin Film Critics Circle	Ireland	Feb 26th- March 8 2019	Winner- Jury Prize for Best Actress awarded to Baran Kosari
11mm Football Film Festival	Berlin, Germany	21-25 March 2019	Winner- Audience Award
Glasgow Film Festival	Scotland	Feb 20th –March 3	Winner- Audience Award went to Soheil Beiraghi
Stockholm International Film Festival	Sweden	7-18 November 2018	Winner- Impact Award given to Soheil Beiraghi
Tokyo International Film Festival	Japan	Oct 25th – Nov 3rd 2018	
Palm Spring Film Festival	United States	3-14 January 2019	
Panama International Film Festival	Panama	4-10 April 2019	
Washington International Film Festival	United States	April 25 - May 5, 2019	
Seattle International Film Festival	United States	May16th- June 9, 2019	
Sydney Film Festival	Australia	5-16 June 2019	
Shanghai International Film Festival	China	15-24 June 2019	
Thinking Football Film Festival	Spain	18-22 March 2019	
Movies that Matter	Netherlands	22-30 March 2019	
Cinélran Festival	Canada	16-18 November 2018	
Minneapolis - Saint Paul International Film Festival	United States	4-20 April 2019	
Fussballichtspiele St. Gallen	Switzerland	14-16 November 2019	
Iranian Film Festival in Prague	Czech Republic	21-31 March 2019	
Quai 10	Belgium	March 8, 2019	
Arab Film Festival	United States	4-12 October 2019	
Iranische Film Festival Koblenz	Germany	October 2019	
The Museum of fine Arts, Houston	United States	October 2019	
The Museum of Fine Arts, Boston	United States	November 2019	
Yokohama Football Film Festival	Japan	16-17 February 2019	
Protesta International Film Festival	Spain	18-26 October 2019	
Das Iranische Wien	Austria	February 2019	
Crime and Punishment Film Festival	Turkey	22-28 November 2019	
Festival Gabes Cinema Fen	Tunisia	12-18 April 2019	
Bengaluru International Film Festival	India	21-28 February 2019	

== Film Production ==
Having already a successful career in directing and screenwriting, Beiraghi made his professional debut as a producer in 2020 with Popular. This was a strong incentive for him to start up the Alef Pictures film company with the aim of producing independent films.

== Jury Membership ==
In 2018, Beiraghi sat on a jury in the competition section at the 29th Stockholm International Film Festival.

== Commentary & Controversy ==
=== I ===
IRIB

Islamic Republic of Iran Broadcasting (IRIB) abstained from releasing the teaser trailers of I (Me) on the pretext that they had been shown on Gem TV, a Persian-language entertainment satellite channel. The film crew tried to convince them that they were unaware of the teaser's release on the satellite channel, but the IRIB's television commercial authorities simply asked for a property deed and did nothing more. The municipality made matters worse by not allowing the placement of any billboards or posters in public places which made the outdoor advertising of the movie practically impossible. On the other hand, the film's screening at the 34th Fajr International Film Festival in Mashhad was cancelled. If it weren't for the advertisements posted on the social networking platforms, I (Me) wouldn't be a box office success. The film was also ranked among the best works of the year by some film periodicals such as Film and 24.

==== Urban advertising and the press ====
Saeed Khani (producer) told ISNA that the film did not use TV, environmental and urban advertisements in any way and only managed to sell 600 million Tomans in ten days by using a team of 15 people to produce content in Social media.

==== Cancelling of the screening in Mashhad ====
I screening was canceled as part of the 34th Fajr Festival in Mashhad.

==== Using age ratings for promoting ====
Some critics have said that the phrase "watching this movie is not recommended for people under the age of 15" in the movie posters and teasers were used to advertise and attract teenage audiences to watch the movie, while the movie does not have such content. However, the agents stated that the age classification is determined by the show licensing council and its inclusion in the poster is the decision of this council.

=== Cold Sweat ===
==== Preventing teaser screening ====
Iranian television also refused to broadcast the Cold Sweat teaser. Beirghi stated that the reason was the TV ban on Baran Kosari. Amir Jadidi plays the role of a radio presenter in the film. This position caused some IRIB correspondents to criticize the portrayal of a TV presenter in the film's press conference. Beirghi replied that the thinking of the organization is hypocritical and he has shown the same thing in the film.

==== Cold Sweat, subject to total indifference ====
Every year the events of Fajr International Film Festival are discussed in Haft (seven) TV talk show on Channel 3, in parallel with everyday screening of the films at the festival. Oddly enough, in 2017 Cold Sweat was excluded from the list of the films that were analyzed and reviewed during the show's evening talks.

The fundamentalist newspaper Javan (young) labeled Cold Sweat as ‘feminist’ and ‘shameful’. Even some of the medias from the opposing side renamed the film Chilled Sweat with the intention of criticizing hookah smoking and tooth brushing scenes. The film came under fierce criticism from Tasnim News Agency whose headlines read ‘Man and Religion’; Feminism Pays Them Back!’ ‘Feminist Extremism Gives Flavour to Football’. Fars News Agency criticized the film for having looked at a domestic issue from a western perspective and blamed it for the propagation of ideas that encourage women to initiate movements and claim their rights. Finally, Mashregh News accused the film by the headline ‘An Obvious Example of Sheer Hypocrisy in Iranian Cinema’.

Contrary to all this harsh criticism, Iran’s Film Critics and Writers Association as well as several film periodicals and cultural magazines such as Film voted Cold Sweat one of the prominent and highly-praised cinematic works of the year. Majid Eslami, the film critic and editor of the online magazine Chahar (four) gave Cold Sweat the highest score among all the films that took part in the Fajr International Film Festival in 2017. Amir Hossein Sa’adat, the magazine’s critic considered the film to be an impressive achievement for Soheil Beiraghi. He asserted that thanks to Cold Sweat the Cinema of Iran rose to a high level of self-awareness and patience. It was, in addition, mentioned as ‘a national film, void of exaggeration’ by Massoud Ferasati, a renowned Iranian film critic and magazine editor who was invited to the TV show Apostrophe. Saeid Ghotbizadeh, another critic of the show enumerated the strong points of the film on his Instagram page after its screening at the festival: Beiraghi’s cleverness in choosing the film’s subject, simple, but influential narration, Baran Kosari’s artistic maturity and dexterity, Amir Jadidi’s thoughtful acting, Sahar Dolatshahi’s skill in playing unusual characters and her ability to make an enemy of herself. Keivan Kasirian admired the filmmaker for his audacity to exploit such themes acknowledging his film as a well-structured and smooth running work.

Other critics pointed out the film’s more plus points like internal integration, clever ending and avoiding clichés with respect to the female character’s image and personality.

==== The ban of Cold Sweat ====
In 2018, the Art Department banned the public screening of Cold Sweat in spite of the fact that it was scheduled for release in 120 movie theaters. A day before the screening, a ban was placed on it without any official announcement in advance. Therefore, the film didn’t stand a chance of being featured in all the 97 theatres reserved for it. As for Hoveyzeh Cineplex, its management was entrusted to the Art Department while the film was being shown on the screen. As soon as this happened, the screening was suspended in the Cineplex and in the end the screening continued only in 20 cinemas.

In response to the ban, Iran Filmmakers Association issued a statement against the Art Department and criticized it for overreacting, as this organ formed a council to censor the filmmakers’ works a second time, even after they had obtained the required authorization for screening their films. Fully informed about the statement, Yazdan Ashiri, the Art Department’s public relations manager told that Cold Sweat wouldn’t be placed in the list of their priorities for screening because of its content and themes. For this reason the film was never screened in the movie theatres affiliated to the Art Department. The national Iranian Television also didn’t release the film’s teaser for almost the same reason.

==== Prohibition of attendance at the public screening ====
Although on October 11 Cold Sweat was due for its public screening in Atlas and Golshan Multiplex Cinemas in Mashhad, the event was cancelled without explanation. Beiraghi expressed his discontent in an interview noting that he and his crew members were deprived from the only option left for them which was the public screening of the film. The film crew had planned to go to Mashhad to see the movie in company with people, but sadly they were prohibited from doing so.

==== Cold Sweat and the Parliament ====
When the Fajr International Festival was being held, Tayyebeh Siavoshi, a fraction member of the Parliament of Iran proposed to amend the law with respect to passport limitations to include the possibility of women’s travelling abroad without their husbands’ permission. She also proposed seeing Cold Sweat at the festival. Therefore, Shahindokht Molaverdi , vice president of Iran in the cabinet of Hassan Rouhani and Mr Sarmast attended the screening of Cold Sweat.

Some of the representatives of the Islamic Consultative Assembly also saw the film. Later, some amendments to the passport regulations were approved and passed in the Parliament, but unfortunately scenarios similar to the ones that happened in the film are still affecting the lives of Iranian sportswomen.

In the years following the film's release, events similar to the film's took place again in various women's sports.

=== Popular ===
==== Cancellation of popular’s public screening ====
In 2019, popular, Beiraghi's third feature film was eliminated from the Fajr Festival's public screening program. The director published a comment on his social media page which read: “God in Heaven!... Popular wasn’t allowed to be screened in Mashhad! I called all the people I knew to ask why. All of them said unanimously, ‘We just obey orders from above!’ I wonder where and who this “above” is! I wish I could talk to this “above”! He or she needs to explain why he doesn't allow the others to see the film while he himself hasn't still seen it and simply eliminated it...” To show respect for his viewers, Beiraghi shared a few minutes of the beginning of his film through live video.

== See also ==
- Cinema of Iran
- Fajr International Film Festival
