= Cold Sweat (2018 film) =

- Film poster
- Directed by: Soheil Beiraghi
- Written by: Soheil Beiraghi
- Produced by: Mahdi Daavari
- Starring: Baran Kosari; Amir Jadidi; Sahar Dolatshahi; Leyli Rashidi; Hoda Zeinolabedin
- Cinematography: Farshad Mohammadi
- Edited by: Bahram Dehghani; Mohammad Najjarian
- Music by: Karen Homayounfar
- Distributed by: Filmiran; Noori Pictures
- Release date: 3 February 2018 (Fajr Film Festival)
- Running time: 86 minutes
- Country: Iran
- Language: Persian
- Box office: 2.046 billion toman (Iran)

Cold Sweat (Persian: عرق سرد, romanized: Aragh-e Sard) is a 2018 Iranian film written and directed by Soheil Beiraghi. The film screened for the first time at the 36th Fajr Film Festival and received 3 awards and 3 nominations.

== Premise ==
Afrooz Ardestani (Baran Kosari) is the captain of the Iranian women's national footbal team. With Afrooz scoring, the national team makes its way to the finals of the Asian Games for the first time and heads to Malaysia. At the airport, she learns that her husband, Yasser Shah Hosseini (Amir Jadidi), has banned her from leaving the country.

== Cast ==
- Baran Kosari as Afrooz Ardestani
- Amir Jadidi as Yaser Shah-hosseini
- Sahar Dolatshahi as Mehrane Nouri
- Leyli Rashidi as Pantea Al-e-Davoud
- Hoda Zeinolabedin As Masi Ata'ei

== Public screening ==
=== International ===
Cold sweat has been screened in many countries of Asia, Europe, the Americas, and Oceania.

==== Asia ====
- Tokyo Int'l Film Festival (25 Oct.-3 Nov 2018/ Japan)
- Yokohama Football Film Festival (16-17 Feb 2019/Japan)
- Bengaluru Int'l Film Festival (21-28 Feb 2019/ India)
- Shanghai Int'l Film Festival (15-24 June 2019/ China)
- Crime and Punishment Film Festival (22-28 Nov 2019/ Turkey)

==== Africa ====
- Festival Gabes Cinema Fen (12-18 April 2019/ Tunisia)

==== Europe ====
- Das Iranische Wien (Feb.2019/ Austria)
- Quai 10 (8 March 2019/ Belgium)
- Thinking Football Film Festival (18-22 March 2019/ Spain)
- Iranian Film Festival in Prague (21-31 March.2019/Czech Republic)
- Movies that Matter (22-30 March 2019/ The Netherlands)
- Arab Film Festival (4-12 Oct. 2019/ Germany)
- Iranische Film Festival Koblenz (Oct. 2019/ Germany)
- Fussballichtspiele St. Gallen (14-16 Nov.2019/ Switzerland)
- Protesta Int'l Film Festival (18-26 Oct. 2019/Spain)

==== Oceania ====
- Sydney Film Festival (5-16 June 2019/ Australia)

==== America ====
- Palm Spring Film Festival (3-14 Jan.2019/USA)
- Panama Int'l Film Festival (4-10 April 2019/ Panama)
- Washington, DC Int'l Film Festival (25 April- 5 May 2019/ USA)
- Seattle Int'l Film Festival (16 May- 9 June 2019/ USA)
- Cinelran Festival (16-18 Nov.2018/ Canada)
- Minneapolis - St Paul Int'l Film Festival (4-20 April 2019/ USA)
- The Museum of fine Arts, Houston (Oct.2019/ USA)
- The Museum of Fine Arts, Boston (Nov. 2019/ USA)

== Reception ==
=== Accolades ===
Year	Award	Category	Recipient	Result
2018	Fajr Film Festival	Best Actor	Amir Jadidi	Won
2018	Fajr Film Festival	Best Actress	Baran Kosari	Nominated
2018	Fajr Film Festival	Best Supporting Actress	Sahar Dolatshahi	Won
2018	Fajr Film Festival	Best Supporting Actress	Leyli Rashidi	Nominated
2018	Fajr Film Festival	Best Supporting Actress	Hoda Zeinolabedin	Nominated
2018	Fajr Film Festival	Best Cinematography	Farshad Mohammadi	Nominated
2018	Fajr Film Festival	Best Original Score	Karen Homayounfar	Nominated
2018	Fajr Film Festival	Best Editor	Bahram Dehghan, Mohammad Najarian	Won

== Commentary and controversy ==
=== Preventing teaser screening ===
Iranian television also refused to broadcast the Cold Sweat teaser. Beirghi stated that the reason was the TV ban on Baran Kosari. Amir Jadidi plays the role of a radio presenter in the film. This position caused some IRIB correspondents to criticize the portrayal of a TV presenter in the film's press conference. Beirghi replied that the thinking of the organization is hypocritical and he has shown the same thing in the film.

=== Cold Sweat, subject to total indifference ===
Every year the events of Fajr International Film Festival are discussed in Haft (seven) TV talk show on Channel 3, in parallel with everyday screening of the films at the festival. Oddly enough, in 2017 Cold Sweat was excluded from the list of the films that were analyzed and reviewed during the show’s evening talks.

The fundamentalist newspaper Javan (young) labeled Cold Sweat as ‘feminist’ and ‘shameful’. Even some of the medias from the opposing side renamed the film Chilled Sweat with the intention of criticizing hookah smoking and tooth brushing scenes. The film came under fierce criticism from Tasnim News Agency whose headlines read ‘Man and Religion’; Feminism Pays Them Back!’ ‘Feminist Extremism Gives Flavour to Football’. Fars News Agency criticized the film for having looked at a domestic issue from a western perspective and blamed it for the propagation of ideas that encourage women to initiate movements and claim their rights. Finally, Mashregh News accused the film by the headline ‘An Obvious Example of Sheer Hypocrisy in Iranian Cinema’.

Contrary to all this harsh criticism, Iran’s Film Critics and Writers Association as well as several film periodicals and cultural magazines such as Film voted Cold Sweat one of the prominent and highly-praised cinematic works of the year. Majid Eslami, the film critic and editor of the online magazine Chahar (four) gave Cold Sweat the highest score among all the films that took part in the Fajr International Film Festival in 2017. Amir Hossein Sa’adat, the magazine’s critic considered the film to be an impressive achievement for Soheil Beiraghi. He asserted that thanks to Cold Sweat the Cinema of Iran rose to a high level of self-awareness and patience. It was, in addition, mentioned as ‘a national film, void of exaggeration’ by Massoud Ferasati, a renowned Iranian film critic and magazine editor who was invited to the TV show Apostrophe. Saeid Ghotbizadeh, another critic of the show enumerated the strong points of the film on his Instagram page after its screening at the festival: Beiraghi’s cleverness in choosing the film’s subject, simple, but influential narration, Baran Kosari’s artistic maturity and dexterity, Amir Jadidi’s thoughtful acting, Sahar Dolatshahi’s skill in playing unusual characters and her ability to make an enemy of herself. Keivan Kasirian admired the filmmaker for his audacity to exploit such themes acknowledging his film as a well-structured and smooth running work.

Other critics pointed out the film’s more plus points like internal integration, clever ending and avoiding clichés with respect to the female character’s image and personality.

=== The ban of Cold Sweat ===
In 2018, the Art Department banned the public screening of Cold Sweat in spite of the fact that it was scheduled for release in 120 movie theaters. A day before the screening, a ban was placed on it without any official announcement in advance. Therefore, the film didn’t stand a chance of being featured in all the 97 theatres reserved for it. As for Hoveyzeh Cineplex, its management was entrusted to the Art Department while the film was being shown on the screen. As soon as this happened, the screening was suspended in the Cineplex and in the end the screening continued only in 20 cinemas.

In response to the ban, Iran Filmmakers Association issued a statement against the Art Department and criticized it for overreacting, as this organ formed a council to censor the filmmakers’ works a second time, even after they had obtained the required authorization for screening their films. Fully informed about the statement, Yazdan Ashiri, the Art Department’s public relations manager told that Cold Sweat wouldn’t be placed in the list of their priorities for screening because of its content and themes. For this reason the film was never screened in the movie theatres affiliated to the Art Department. The national Iranian Television also didn’t release the film’s teaser for almost the same reason.

=== Prohibition of attendance at the public screening ===
Although on October 11 Cold Sweat was due for its public screening in Atlas and Golshan Multiplex Cinemas in Mashhad, the event was cancelled without explanation. Beiraghi expressed his discontent in an interview noting that he and his crew members were deprived from the only option left for them which was the public screening of the film. The film crew had planned to go to Mashhad to see the movie in company with people, but sadly they were prohibited from doing so.

=== Cold Sweat and the Parliament ===
When the Fajr International Festival was being held, Tayyebeh Siavoshi, a fraction member of the Parliament of Iran proposed to amend the law with respect to passport limitations to include the possibility of women’s travelling abroad without their husbands’ permission. She also proposed seeing Cold Sweat at the festival. Therefore, Shahindokht Molaverdi, vice president of Iran in the cabinet of Hassan Rouhani and Mr Sarmast attended the screening of Cold Sweat.

Some of the representatives of the Islamic Consultative Assembly also saw the film. Later, some amendments to the passport regulations were approved and passed in the Parliament, but unfortunately scenarios similar to the ones that happened in the film are still affecting the lives of Iranian sportswomen.

In the years following the film's release, events similar to the film's took place again in various women's sports.
