= Blue Whale (TV series) =

Iranian mystery television series

- Logo of Blue Whale
- Genre: Drama; Mystery; Romance; Thriller
- Written by: Bahram Tavakoli
- Directed by: Fereydoun Jeyrani
- Starring: Saed Soheili; Leila Hatami; Hossein Yari; Mostafa Zamani; Mahoor Alvand; Hamid Reza Azarang; Vishka Asayesh; Azadeh Samadi; Diba Zahedi; Majid Mozaffari; Farhad Aeesh; Parivash Nazarieh; Elham Korda; Alireza Sanifar
- Theme music composer: Omid Raiesdana
- Opening theme: Omid Raiesdana
- Ending theme: Sirvan Khosravi; Kaveh Yaghmaei
- Composer: Omid Raiesdana
- Country of origin: Iran
- Original language: Persian
- No. of episodes: 30

Production
- Producer: Saeid Malekan
- Production locations: Tehran, Iran
- Cinematography: Ali Ghazi
- Editor: Meysam Molaei
- Running time: 40-60 minutes

Original release
- Network: Home Video (in Iran)
- Release: 29 January 2019

Blue Whale (Persian: نهنگ آبی, romanized: Nahange Abi) is a 2019 drama mystery series directed by Fereydoun Jeyrani, written by Bahram Tavakoli and produced by Saeid Malekan. This series is in an adventurous atmosphere in Persian and a product of Iran. In addition to Saeid Malekan, Honar Aval and Filimo companies are also investors in the series. The series named after the Blue Whale Challenge.

== Plot ==
"Armin" (Saed Soheili), a young 25-year-old computer savvy student, is unable to communicate with people and spends most of his time with his own book-reading website. His father (Majid Mozaffari) is suffering from MS and has been separated from his mother (Parivash Nazarieh). She meets a girl on the reading website, "Jaleh" (Mahoor Alvand), whose list of favorite books is very similar to Armin's. Jaleh, who has financial difficulties, introduces him to work at a company where she works as a graphic artist. Armin in the company, meet "Bahman" (Hossein Yari) Branch Chief, "Anahita" (Leila Hatami) Bahman's nominee, Haleh (Azadeh Samadi) Company Secretary, "Nader" (Hamid Reza Azarang) board member of the main company, and "Morvarid" (Vishka Asayesh) Nader's wife and another board member of the main company. Armin is hired as the network security officer at the company, and this is the start of his new life.

== Cast ==
Main Cast
Actor	Character	Details
Saed Soheili	Armin Mashreqi	The main character
Leila Hatami	Anahita Kashef	Company marketer & fiancé of Bahman
Mostafa Zamani	Jahan (Jahangir)	Drug Dealer & Anahita's Friend
Hossein Yari	Bahman Ajand	Head of Company Branch & fiancé of Anahita
Vishka Asayesh	Morvarid Parsa	Board Member & Nader's Wife
Hamid Reza Azarang	Nader Seraj (Hamidian)	Board Member & Morvarid's Wife
Mahoor Alvand	Jaleh Adib	Company Graphic Designer & fiancé of Armin
Azadeh Samadi	Haleh	Company Branch Secretary & Nader Spy
