= Bidad (film) =

- Official poster
- Directed by: Soheil Beiraghi
- Written by: Soheil Beiraghi
- Produced by: Soheil Beiraghi
- Starring: Sarvin Zabetian; Amir Jadidi; Leili Rashidi
- Cinematography: Peyman Shadmanfar
- Edited by: Soheil Beiraghi; Milad Mahdavi
- Music by: Bamdad Afshar
- Production company: Alef Pictures
- Release date: 9 July 2025 (Karlovy Vary International Film Festival)
- Running time: 104 minutes
- Country: Iran
- Language: Persian

Bidad (Persian: بی‌داد), also known as Outcry, is a 2025 Iranian drama film written, directed, and produced by Soheil Beiraghi. The film stars Sarvin Zabetian, Amir Jadidi, and Leili Rashidi. Beiraghi also served as art director and co-editor, with cinematography by Peyman Shadmanfar and music by Bamdad Afshar. The film was produced independently by Alef Pictures, with Pluto Film handling international sales.

The film follows Seti, a young singer in Tehran who challenges restrictions on women performing publicly in Iran by singing in the streets. Her performances attract attention and make her a figure among younger Iranians seeking greater freedom.

Bidad had its world premiere on 9 July 2025 in the Crystal Globe Competition at the Karlovy Vary International Film Festival. It received the festival's Special Jury Prize.

== Plot ==
Seti is a young aspiring singer in Tehran who wants to perform publicly. Because women are not permitted to perform publicly in Iran, she turns the streets into a stage and begins singing for passersby. Videos of her performances spread online, and she quickly gains popularity.

As Seti's popularity grows, she attracts the attention of the authorities. She becomes involved with Bebin, a tattooed streetwise man played by Amir Jadidi, who becomes close to her and attempts to protect her. After Seti is imprisoned, the experience affects both her voice and her ability to speak, and Bebin tries to help her recover.

== Cast ==
- Sarvin Zabetian as Seti
- Amir Jadidi as Bebin
- Leili Rashidi as Homeyra

== Production ==
Bidad is Beiraghi's fourth feature film. The Karlovy Vary International Film Festival lists him as the film's writer, director, producer, art director, and one of its two editors. Milad Mahdavi served as co-editor, Peyman Shadmanfar as cinematographer, Bamdad Afshar as composer, and Hossein Ghourchian as sound designer. Alef Pictures produced the film, while Pluto Film handled international sales.

The film was produced independently and without the usual official approval for film production in Iran. KVIFF stated that Beiraghi was under investigation by Iranian authorities during production. Because of security concerns, the festival withheld the film's inclusion in the Crystal Globe Competition until Beiraghi and members of the production team had safely left Iran.

In an interview with TheWrap, Beiraghi said that he had received official approval for his previous three films but chose to make Bidad without such approval.

== Legal issues ==
In July 2025, Radio Farda reported that Beiraghi and several members of the film's cast and crew had been sentenced in connection with the production of Bidad. Those named in the case included Leili Rashidi, Amir Jadidi, Sarvin Zabetian, Ali Mollagholipour, and Peyman Shadmanfar.

According to Radio Farda, Beiraghi was sentenced to a total of four years and three months in prison, but the prison sentence was converted to a monetary fine. A report by the Human Rights Activists News Agency, citing the court verdict, said that the sentence consisted of three years and seven months for "encouraging corruption" and an additional eight months for "producing obscene content"; the combined sentence was converted to a fine. Radio Farda also reported that the rulings could be appealed.

== Release ==
In early June 2025, the Karlovy Vary International Film Festival announced eleven films in the Crystal Globe Competition but withheld the title of the twelfth entry. On 25 June, the festival announced that the twelfth film was Bidad, explaining that the title had been kept secret to protect the safety of the film's delegation.

The film had its world premiere on 9 July 2025 at the Grand Hall of the Karlovy Vary International Film Festival as part of the Crystal Globe Competition. It received the Special Jury Prize at the festival's closing ceremony on 12 July.

== Reception ==
Wendy Ide of Screen Daily described Bidad as a potent drama about a young woman fighting to be heard. She praised Sarvin Zabetian's performance and the film's cinematography, while criticizing aspects of its screenplay, dialogue, and abrupt editing.

Ide also highlighted the relationship between Seti and Bebin as an unusual and affecting element of the film, and described Amir Jadidi's performance as a departure from his previous roles.

Chase Hutchinson of TheWrap discussed the film alongside the circumstances of its production, drawing a parallel between Seti's struggle to make her voice heard and Beiraghi's efforts to make and present the film without official approval.
