= These Voices Are Real =

2026 Iranian short film directed by Baran Nikrah

- Directed by: Baran Nikrah
- Written by: Baran Nikrah
- Produced by: Baran Nikrah; Hoda Zeinolabedin
- Starring: Hoda Zeinolabedin; Dorrin Afsharian
- Cinematography: Farshad Mohammadi
- Edited by: Hamid Najafirad
- Release date: 2026
- Running time: 11 minutes
- Country: Iran
- Language: Persian

These Voices Are Real (Persian: این صداها واقعی‌ست; transliterated as In Sedaha Vagheist) is a 2026 Iranian short drama film written and directed by Baran Nikrah and produced by Nikrah and Hoda Zeinolabedin. It stars Zeinolabedin and Dorrin Afsharian. Nikrah's directorial debut, the film concerns the experiences of women and girls in contemporary society.

The film premiered at the 38th Minimalen Short Film Festival in Trondheim, Norway, where it received the Audience Award in the international competition, the Raskin Spirit Festival Award, and an honourable mention from the international jury.

== Plot ==
While waiting for medical test results, a woman spends the day with her young daughter. She sends recorded messages to a man who remains off screen, while the girl watches and copies her mother's actions. The narrative connects the woman's hesitation over a decision with her daughter's developing understanding of femininity through listening and imitation.

== Cast ==
- Hoda Zeinolabedin
- Dorrin Afsharian

== Production ==
Nikrah wrote and directed the film and co-produced it with Zeinolabedin. Farshad Mohammadi was the cinematographer, Hamid Najafirad edited the film, and Mohsen Shah Ebrahimi served as production designer. Mehdi Ebrahimzadeh recorded the sound, with sound design by Hosein Abolsedgh. Sara Khaledi was the costume designer and Abbas Abbasi the makeup artist.

== Release ==
The film's world premiere took place at the 2026 Minimalen Short Film Festival, held in Trondheim from 13 to 18 January. It subsequently screened at the Golden Grape Short Film Festival in Georgia and in competition at SXSW London.

== Accolades ==
| Year | Festival | Award | Recipient | Result | Ref. |
|---|---|---|---|---|---|
| 2026 | Minimalen Short Film Festival | Audience Award — International Competition | These Voices Are Real | Won | |
| 2026 | Minimalen Short Film Festival | Raskin Spirit Festival Award | These Voices Are Real | Won | |
| 2026 | Minimalen Short Film Festival | Honourable Mention — International Competition | These Voices Are Real | Received | |
| 2026 | Golden Grape Short Film Festival | Best Director | Baran Nikrah | Won | |
| 2026 | Prishtina International Film Festival | Best Short Film | These Voices Are Real | Won | |
