= Hoda Zeinolabedin =

Iranian actress (born 1989)

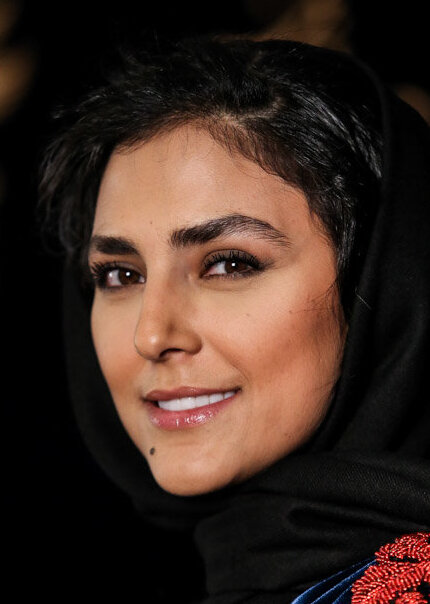
- Zeinolabedin in 2017
- Born: June 13, 1983 (age 43); Tehran, Iran
- Education: University of Applied Science and Technology (A.D)
- Occupation: Actress
- Years active: 2005–present

Hoda Zeinolabedin (Persian: هدی زین‌العابدین; born 1983) is an Iranian actress. She has received various accolades, including a Hafez Award, in addition to nominations for two Crystal Simorghs and an Iran's Film Critics and Writers Association Award.

== Life ==
Hoda Zeinolabedin was born 1983 in Tehran, Iran.

== Filmography ==
=== Film ===
Year	Title	Role	Director	Notes	Ref(s)
2006	Bright House		Vahid Mousaian		
2014	End of the Service	Mina Ravanbakhsh	Hamid Zargarnezhad		
2017	Israfil	Sara	Ida Panahandeh		
2018	The Old Road	Parisa	Manijeh Hekmat		
2018	Cold Sweat	Masi Ataee	Soheil Beiraghi		
2019	They	Farzaneh	Ehsan Soltanian		
2019	Symphony No. 9	Rabia Balkhi	Mohammad Reza Honarmand		
2019	Gold	Elham	Parviz Shahbazi		
2021	Zalava	Malihe	Arsalan Amri		
2021	A Bumpy Story	Raha	Kamal Tabrizi		
2022	Squad of Girls	Fereshteh	Monir Gheidi		
2023	Fragrant	Atefeh	Hadi Moghaddamdoost		
2025	Kill the Game		Mohammad Ebrahim Azizi		
2026	Escort	Helma	Yousef Hatamikia	Filming	
2026	Slumber		Mani Moghaddam		
2026	These Voices Are Real		Baran Nikrah	Short film, also producer	

=== Web ===
Year	Title	Role	Director	Platform	Notes	Ref(s)
2012–2014	Frozen Heart	Taraneh	Saman Moghaddam	Namava	Supporting role; season 3	
2014	I'm Just Kidding		Mehran Modiri	Filimo	Recurring role	
2019	Dance on the Glass	Darya Derakhshan	Mehdi Golestaneh	Namava	Main role	
2019–2020	Rhino	Gisoo	Kiarash Asadizadeh	Filimo, Namava	Main role	
2023	Set Me Free	Maral Hesaraki	Shahram Shah Hosseini	Filimo	Main role	
2024	At the End of the Night	Mahrokh Zarbaf	Ida Panahandeh	Filmnet	Main role	
TBA	Leily and Majnun		Hamid Reza Ghorbani		Main role	

=== Television ===
Year	Title	Role	Director	Network	Notes	Ref(s)
2009–2010	The Chef	Panel maker's daughter	Mohammad Reza Honarmand	IRIB TV1	TV series; guest appearance	
2011	Fall of an Angel	Fatemeh	Bahram Bahramian	IRIB TV1	TV series; main role	
2012	All My Family	Shaparak	Dariush Farhang	IRIB TV3	TV series; main role	

== Awards and nominations ==
Name of the award ceremony, year presented, category, nominee of the award, and the result of the nomination
Award	Year	Category	Nominated work	Result	Ref(s)
Fajr Film Festival	2018	Best Actress in a Supporting Role	Cold Sweat	Nominated	
Fajr Film Festival	2023	Best Actress in a Leading Role	Fragrant	Nominated	
Hafez Awards	2023	Best Actress – Television Series Drama	Set Me Free	Won	
Hafez Awards	2024	Best Actress – Television Series Drama	At the End of the Night	Nominated	
Iran's Film Critics and Writers Association	2018	Best Actress in a Supporting Role	Cold Sweat	Nominated	
