= Shahr-e Mooshha =

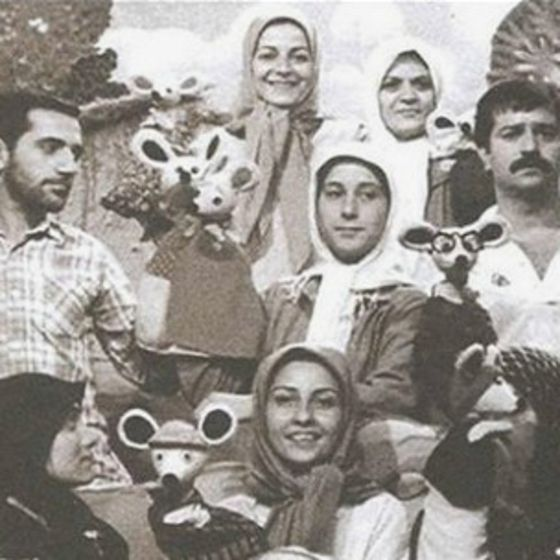
- Created by: Marzieh Boroumand
- No. of episodes: 10

Original release
- Release: 1981 – 1984

Shahr-e Moosha (or School of Mice) was an Iranian TV show that aired from 1981 to 1984. The show for 10 episodes with a movie, called City of Mice, featuring the same cast being released in 1985. In 2014 a screening was aired.

The show was created by Marzieh Boroumand.

== Main Characters ==
- Kopal (Chubby): The mouse that loves food
- Eynaki (Goggles/Four-Eyes): The highly disciplined mouse
- Khabaloo (Sleepy): The chronically exhausted mouse
- Dum-Barik (Short-Tail): A playful, mischievous mouse that gets in trouble often
- Goushe-Deraz (Long-Ears): The alert one with large ears
