= Unpopular (film) =

2020 Iranian drama film

- Film poster
- Directed by: Soheil Beiraghi
- Written by: Soheil Beiraghi
- Produced by: Soheil Beiraghi
- Starring: Fatemeh Motamed-Arya; Hootan Shakiba; Baran Kosari
- Cinematography: Hossein Jafarian
- Edited by: Hayedeh Safiyari
- Music by: Christophe Rezai
- Production company: Alef Pictures
- Distributed by: Persia Film Distribution
- Release date: 1 February 2020 (Fajr Film Festival)
- Running time: 91 minutes
- Country: Iran
- Language: Persian

Unpopular (Persian: عامه‌پسند, romanized: Aamme-Pasand) is a 2020 Iranian drama film written, directed, and produced by Soheil Beiraghi. The film was selected for the Simorgh Competition section of the 38th Fajr Film Festival. Images of Fatemeh Motamed-Arya and Baran Kosari were removed from the film's outdoor advertising.

In November 2023, Unpopular, directed by Soheil Beiraghi, was released theatrically after four years. The Ministry of Culture and Islamic Guidance prohibited the use of images of the film's two female actors, Fatemeh Motamed-Arya and Baran Kosari, in its promotional materials. In response, the production team also decided to remove the image of Hootan Shakiba, the film's male actor, from its posters and outdoor advertisements. As a result, the film's official poster was released without images of the cast, featuring only the film's title and the names of the cast and crew. The move was regarded as a protest against the restrictions imposed on female actors in Iran's cultural sphere.

== Cast ==
- Fatemeh Motamed-Arya as Fahime Mirbod
- Hootan Shakiba as Milad Bodaghi
- Baran Kosari as Afsane Shirkhodaei

== Plot ==
Fahimeh Mirbod, a 57-year-old woman, is divorced from her husband. She returns to her small hometown and decides to build a new life with a low dowry. Following this decision, she encounters an obstacle; she is against the custom and tradition of the people of her city. Fahimeh is Unpopular.

== Commentary and controversy ==
In 2019, Unpopular, Beiraghi's third feature film was eliminated from the Fajr Festival's public screening program. The director published a comment on his social media page which read: “God in Heaven!... Popular wasn’t allowed to be screened in Mashhad! I called all the people I knew to ask why. All of them said unanimously, ‘We just obey orders from above!’ I wonder where and who this “above” is! I wish I could talk to this “above”! He or she needs to explain why he doesn't allow the others to see the film while he himself hasn't still seen it and simply eliminated it...” To show respect for his viewers, Beiraghi shared a few minutes of the beginning of his film through live video.
