= Inversion (film) =

2016 film

- Film poster
- Directed by: Behnam Behzadi
- Written by: Behnam Behzadi
- Starring: Ali Mossafa; Sahar Dolatshahi; Setareh Hosseini; Setareh Pesyani; Shirin Yazdanbakhsh; Roya Javidnia
- Music by: Sahar Sakhaei
- Release date: 18 May 2016 (Cannes)
- Running time: 84 minutes
- Country: Iran
- Language: Persian

Inversion (Persian: وارونگی) is a 2016 Iranian film directed by Behnam Behzadi. It was screened in the Un Certain Regard section at the 2016 Cannes Film Festival.

== Plot ==
At 35, Niloofar lives with her mother in Tehran. Because of heavy air pollution, her family decides to move her to the countryside without asking her. After a lifetime of obeying others, she finally chooses to resist and stand up for herself.

== Historical background ==
In November 2016, air pollution in Tehran was so bad that the authorities ordered schools to close and the most sensitive populations, such as children and the elderly, to stay at home. The film refers to the orders issued by President Mahmoud Ahmadinejad, who, in response to the international sanctions imposed on Iran's nuclear program, ordered refineries to produce low-quality gasoline, in defiance of environmental standards. These measures led to the deadly smog that hit the country a few years later.

Director Behnam Behzadi uses the metaphor of unbreathable air to paint the portrait of a woman in struggle, in the midst of conquering her own space of freedom.
