= Boomerang (2024 German-Iranian film) =

2024 drama film

- Directed by: Shahab Fotouhi
- Written by: Shahab Fotouhi
- Produced by: Luise Hauschild; Mariam Shatberashvili
- Starring: Arash Naimian; Leili Rashidi
- Cinematography: Faraz Fesharaki
- Edited by: Alexandre Koberidze; Pouya Parsamagham
- Music by: Panagiotis Mina
- Production company: New Matter Films
- Release date: 28 August 2024 (Venice)
- Running time: 83 minutes
- Countries: Germany; Iran
- Language: Persian

Boomerang is a 2024 drama film written and directed by Shahab Fotouhi, in his directorial debut.

A co-production between Germany and Iran, the film had its world premiere in the Giornate degli Autori section of the 81st Venice International Film Festival.

== Cast ==
- Arash Naimian as Behzad
- Leili Rashidi as Sima
- Yas Farkhondeh as Minoo
- Ali Hanafian as Keyvan
- Shaghayeh Djodat as Sadaf

== Production ==
The film was produced by New Matter Films, with Rainy Pictures and Zohal Films serving as co-producers. The director cited Abbas Kiarostami's The Report among his sources of inspiration.

== Release ==
The film premiered at the 81st edition of the Venice Film Festival, in the Giornate degli Autori sidebar.

== Reception ==
Variety's critic Siddhant Adlakha praised the film, describing it as "a delightful, surprising portrait of modern Iran" that "paints metropolitan Tehran with youthful verve, capturing [...] the city's vibes during a moment of generational transition".

Marc van de Klashorst from International Cinephile Society referred to the film as "an insightful and sharply observed film about relationships and the erosion of manhood with a unique artistic approach that harkens back to one of the most lauded and remarkable films of recent years.".

Vittoria Scarpa from Cineuropa described the film as "outside the canons", and wrote: "Boomerang is one of those films that requires an active viewer to put the pieces of the puzzle together [...], but it becomes captivating if you let yourself be carried away by the flow of the narrative without asking too many questions".
