= I (2016 film) =

- Theatrical release poster
- Directed by: Soheil Beiraghi
- Written by: Soheil Beiraghi
- Produced by: Saeid Sa'adi, Saeid Khani
- Starring: Leila Hatami; Amir Jadidi; Behnoush Bakhtiari; Mani Haghighi
- Cinematography: MoeinReza Motallebi
- Edited by: Shima Monfared
- Music by: Karen Homayounfar
- Distributed by: Nasim-e Saba
- Release dates: 3 February 2016 (Fajr Film Festival); 17 August 2016 (Iran)
- Running time: 84 minutes
- Country: Iran
- Language: Persian
- Box office: 2.281 billion toman

I (Persian: من, romanized: Man), also known as Me, is a 2016 Iranian drama film written and directed by Soheil Beiraghi, in his feature directorial debut. The film was produced by Saeid Sa'adi and Saeid Khani and stars Leila Hatami, Amir Jadidi, Behnoush Bakhtiari, and Mani Haghighi. It was selected for the 34th Fajr Film Festival and was screened in both the Sodaye Simorgh and Negah-e No sections. The film was theatrically released in Iran on 17 August 2016.

== Plot ==
A woman living a double life earns money through illegal activities, moving through Tehran’s underground while confronting the pressures of law, society, and systems of control.

== Cast ==
- Leila Hatami as Azar
- Amir Jadidi as Aria
- Behnoush Bakhtiari as Maliheh
- Hamidreza Saeedikhah as Ahmad
- Alireza Ostadi as Amir
- Ali Mansour as Mojtaba Barati
- Saeed Ataeian as Mohsen
- Morteza Aghahosseini as Doctor
- Stephanie Kali as Alice
- Mani Haghighi as the reporter

== Release ==
=== Iran ===
I had its festival premiere at the 34th Fajr Film Festival on 3 February 2016. It was released theatrically in Iran on 17 August 2016.

The film opened in 14 cinemas. According to producer Saeid Khani, it grossed more than 600 million tomans during its first ten days, after expanding to 17 cinemas in Tehran and 10 cinemas in other cities. Khani said that the film became profitable during its second week of release.

The film was reported to have earned approximately three billion tomans in domestic and foreign box-office revenue by the end of its release.

=== International ===
The film was screened at a number of international film festivals and cultural venues across Asia, Europe, Oceania, and North America.

==== Asia ====
- 15th Pune International Film Festival, Pune, India — 12–19 January 2017
- China National Film Museum, Beijing, China — 23–29 August 2017
- Guwahati International Film Festival, India — 28 October–2 November 2017

==== Europe ====
- 6th Iranian Film Festival, Prague, Czech Republic — 10–21 January 2017, competition section
- 7th London Iranian Film Festival, London, United Kingdom — 28 October–7 November 2016
- Tallinn Black Nights Film Festival, Tallinn, Estonia — 11–27 November 2016, Forum section
- Persian Cine Club, Geneva, Switzerland — May 2017
- Iranian Film Festival Zurich, Switzerland — May 2017

==== Oceania ====
- 6th Iranian Film Festival Australia — 20 October–13 November 2016

==== North America ====
- Museum of Fine Arts, Houston, Houston, United States — 20–22 January 2017
- Museum of Fine Arts, Boston, Boston, United States — 26 and 28 January 2017
- Gene Siskel Film Center, Chicago, United States — 4–5 February 2017
- Smithsonian Institution, Washington, D.C., United States — 11 February 2017

The film was also made available through Amazon Prime Video.

== Awards and nominations ==
Award	Date of ceremony	Category	Recipient(s)	Result	Ref(s)
34th Fajr Film Festival	11 February 2016	Best Supporting Actor	Amir Jadidi	Nominated	
34th Fajr Film Festival	11 February 2016	Best Supporting Actress	Behnoush Bakhtiari	Nominated	
10th Iran's Film Critics and Writers Association Awards	18 September 2016	Best Actress	Leila Hatami	Won	
1st Cinema Newspaper Awards	6 June 2016	Best Actress	Leila Hatami	Won	
6th Iranian Film Festival Australia	14 May 2017	Best Actress	Leila Hatami	Won	
19th Iranian Cinema Celebration	21 September 2017	Best Screenplay	Soheil Beiraghi	Nominated	
19th Iranian Cinema Celebration	21 September 2017	Best Supporting Actress	Behnoush Bakhtiari	Nominated	
19th Iranian Cinema Celebration	21 September 2017	Best Sound Recording	Nasser Entezari	Nominated	
19th Iranian Cinema Celebration	21 September 2017	Best Sound Mixing	Alireza Alavian	Nominated	
