= Marzieh Boroumand =

Iranian Puppeteer

- مرضیه برومند
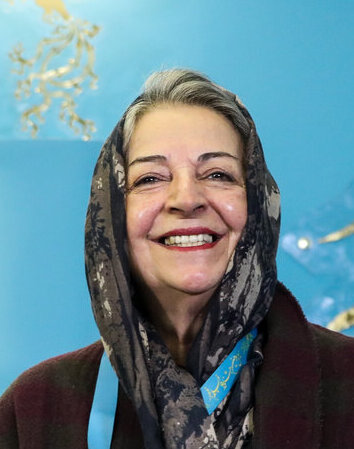
- Boroumand in 2025
- Born: Marzieh Sadat Boroumand Yazdi; June 8, 1951 (age 75); Tehran, Iran
- Education: University of Tehran
- Occupations: director, Actress, screenwriter and puppeteer
- Years active: 1969–present
- Relatives: Raziyeh Boroumand (sister); Leyli Rashidi (niece); Davoud Rashidi (brother-in-law) Farhad Rachidi (nephew)

Marzieh Boroumand (Persian: مرضیه برومند) is a film director, actress, screenwriter and puppeteer of TV series and films. She is best known for Alo!Alo! Man joojoo-am (1994), Barbershop Ziba (1989) and City of Mice (1985). She began her career in cinema by playing in The Cycle directed by Dariush Mehrjui.

== Biography ==
She was born June 8, 1951, in the city of Tehran, Iran. She has three sisters and two brothers. She believes the main reason that she never got married was that her job always was her priority.

== Films ==
- The City of Mice 2 - director, (family film)
- Shahr-e Mooshha - director, (family film)
- Eve's Red Apple - Actor

== Television ==
- Hotel All of My Children - director, Children's TV series.
