= Hamid Reza Azarang =

Iranian actor, writer and film director

- حمیدرضا آذرنگ
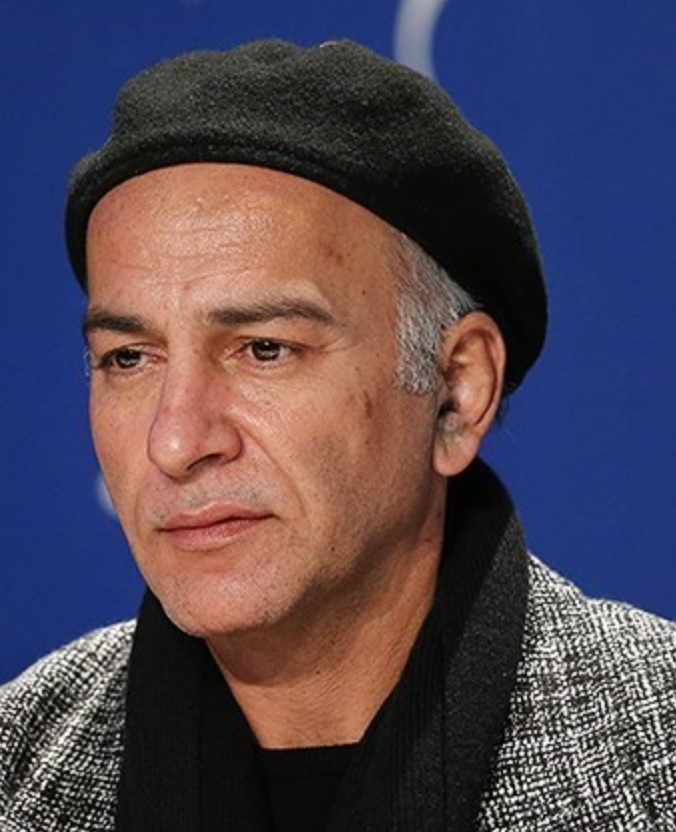
- Azarang at the 2022 Fajr Film Festival
- Born: May 23, 1972 (age 54); Tehran, Iran
- Occupations: Actor; director; screenwriter
- Years active: 1999–present
- Spouse: Sanaz Bayan
- Children: 2; including Hirad

Hamid Reza Azarang (Persian: حمیدرضا آذرنگ; born May 23, 1972) is an Iranian actor, director and screenwriter.

== Early life ==
After graduating from university, Hamid Reza Azarang began his professional career in the theater. In 1999, he was briefly featured in a film which has since been partly lost. In 2001, in addition to his work as a playwright, he became very active in the performance of various works and won related accolades. In 2007, with a serial airing abroad, at home he began work in television. His second release to cinemas was in 2009 with the movie Awakening Dreams. In 2010 he began a series on the Zayandeh Rood track, in which Yalda Hassan Mirbagheri was featured.

Azarang is married to Sanaz Bayan and has a son named Bamdad.

== Filmography ==
=== Film ===
Year	Title	Role	Director	Notes	Ref(s)
2018	The Lost Strait	Khalil	Bahram Tavakoli		
2018	Forty Seven	Sara's father	Alireza Ataallahetabrizi, Ahmad Otraghchi		
2019	Gholamreza Takhti	Taleghani	Bahram Tavakoli		
2019	Zero Floor	Vahid	Ebrahim Ebrahimian		
2019	Haunt	Reza	Siamak Kashefazar	Short film	
2021	Under Low Light		Mohammad Parvizi		
2022	Killing a Traitor	Adi	Masoud Kimiai		

=== Web ===
Year	Title	Role	Director	Platform	Notes	Ref(s)
2013–2014	King of Ear	Ahmad Sorkhi	Davood Mirbagheri	Filimo	Main role	
2015	Golden Tooth	Enayat Sarkhosh	Davood Mirbagheri	Namava	Main role	
2019	Blue Whale	Nader Seraj (Hamidian)	Fereydoun Jeyrani	Filimo	Main role	
2021	Mutual Friendship	Himself	Shahab Hosseini	Namava	Talk show; 1 episode	
2022	Chameleon	Manouchehr	Borzou Niknejad	Filmnet	Main role	

=== Television ===
Year	Name	Role	Director
2023	Mastooran		Seyed Ali Hashemi
2019	Noon Khe		Saeed Aghakhani
2018	Roozhayeh Bigharari 2	Bijan	Kazem Ma'asoumi
2018	Armando	Arman	Hamid Taheri
2016	Ferris wheel		Aziz Allah Hamidnejad
2015	Shahrzad		Hassan Fathi
2011	Dastha Negah Mikonand		Ebrahim Sheibani
2010	In the Strand of Zayandeh Rud	Mehran Lawyer	Hassan Fathi

== Awards and nominations ==
- Best Playwright in Fadjr International Theater Festival for "Death of a Salesman" 2015.
- Best Playwright in Fadjr International Theater Festival for "Memory Sealed Freshens" 2016.
