= Mahoor Alvand =

Iranian actress (born 1994)

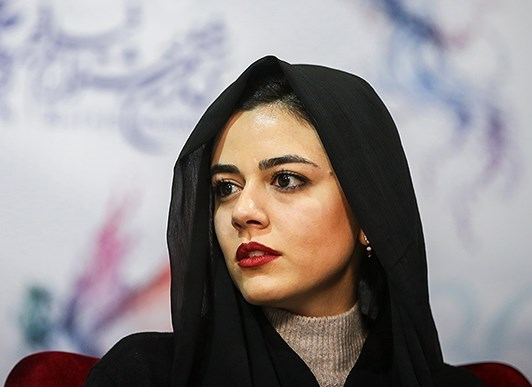
- Alvand at the 36th Fajr International Film Festival
- Born: Mahoor Alvand; July 13, 1994 (age 32)
- Occupation: Actress
- Years active: 2015–present
- Parent(s): Sirous Alvand (father); Zahra Jenab (mother)
- Relatives: Khashayar Alvand (uncle)

Mahoor Alvand (Persian: ماهور الوند; born July 13, 1994) is an Iranian actress known for her work in film, television, and theater. She gained prominence for her roles in films such as Daughter (2016), directed by Reza Mirkarimi, and the television series Innocent (2021), directed by Mehran Ahmadi. A graduate of the Faculty of Fine Arts at the University of Tehran with a degree in theater, Alvand has established herself as a versatile performer in Iranian cinema.

She is the daughter of Sirous Alvand, a renowned Iranian filmmaker, and the niece of Khashayar Alvand, a celebrated screenwriter.

== Early life ==
Mahoor Alvand was born on July 13, 1994, in Tehran, Iran. Raised in an artistic family, her father, Sirous Alvand, is a well-known director and screenwriter, and her mother is Zahra Jenab. She has an older sister named Ahoo. Her uncle, Khashayar Alvand, was a prominent screenwriter who died in 2019 due to a heart attack. Growing up in a cinematic environment, Mahoor was mentored by her father in the principles of acting. She earned a bachelor’s degree in theater from the University of Tehran’s Faculty of Fine Arts and later pursued a master’s degree in acting and directing at Azad University in Tehran. She also trained under the late Hamid Samandarian, a revered theater director, attending his acting workshops to hone her craft.

== Career ==
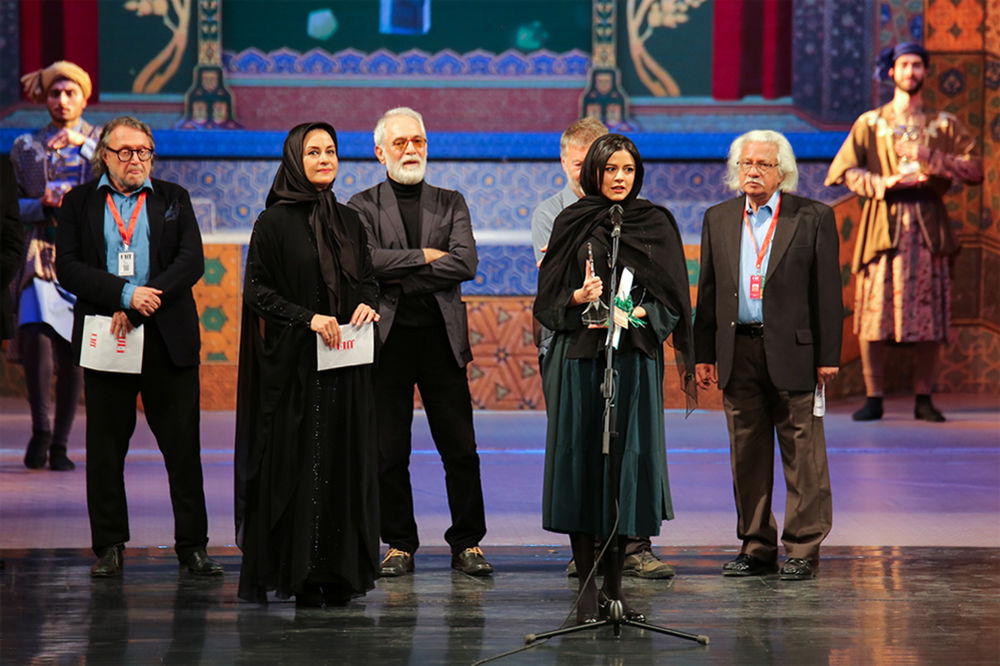
Mahoor Alvand received the Best Actress award for her performance in "Istanbul Junction" at the 36th Fajr International Film Festival in 2018.

Mahoor Alvand began her professional career in theater, participating in student theater festivals during her university years. Two of her performances were recognized as outstanding at festivals, one staged at the Samandarian Theater and another at the Ab Theater. Her cinematic debut came with a leading role in Daughter (2016), directed by Reza Mirkarimi, which earned critical acclaim and was nominated for seven Crystal Simorgh awards at the 34th Fajr Film Festival, winning Best Music Score. The film also received praise at the 2016 Moscow International Film Festival.

Following Daughter, Alvand starred in Melli and Her Untraveled Paths (2017), directed by Tahmineh Milani, portraying a young woman who defies her family’s wishes for love and marriage. In 2018, she appeared in Istanbul Junction by Mostafa Kiaei, playing Ladan Rezaei, and described the project as one of her most rewarding professional experiences due to the collaborative team. That same year, her performance in Hattrick earned her the Best Actress award at the 36th Fajr International Film Festival.

Alvand has also made a significant mark in Iran’s streaming platforms. She played Zhaleh Adib in Blue Whale (2019), directed by Fereydoun Jeyrani; Thelma in Professional (2021), directed by Mostafa Taghizadeh; and Jana Nabati in Innocent (2021), directed by Mehran Ahmadi. She also appeared in the series Die Hard (2024), which was well-received by audiences.

== Filmography ==
=== Cinema ===
Year	Title	Role	Director	Notes
2015	Girl		Reza Mirkarimi	
2016	Mali and Her Untraveled Paths		Tahmineh Milani	
2016	Hat-Trick		Ramtin Lavafi	
2017	Istanbul Junction		Mostafa Kiaei	
2018	Gholamreza Takhti		Bahram Tavakoli	
2018	Right There at That Hour		Siroos Alvand	
2019	Spider		Ebrahim Irajzad	

=== Web ===
Year	Title	Role	Director	Notes
2024	Die Hard	Hanieh	Mostafa Taghizadeh	Streamed on FilmNet
2022	Innocent		Mehran Ahmadi	Streamed on Filimo
2021	Professional		Mostafa Taghizadeh	Streamed on Namava
2018	Blue Whale		Fereydoun Jirani	Streamed on Filimo

== Awards and honors ==
Year	Festival	Category	Work	Result	Source
2017	36th Fajr Film Festival	Best Actress in a Leading Role	Istanbul Junction	Nominated	
2018	37th Fajr International Film Festival	Best Actress	Hat-Trick	Won	
