= Saeid Malekan =

Iranian producer, makeup designer and director

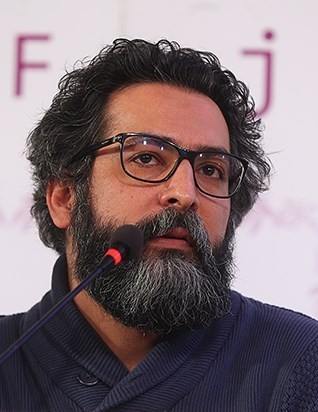
- Born: 2 April 1979 (age 47); Tehran, Iran
- Occupation: Makeup designer–Producer–Make-up artist
- Years active: 1992–present

Saeid Malekan (Persian: سعید ملکان; born April 2, 1979) is an Iranian producer, makeup designer and director.

== Filmography ==
=== Film ===
Year	Title	Notes	Makeup Designer	Producer	Screenwriter	Investor	Actor	Director
2017	Sperm Whale: Roya's Selection	makeup artist						
2016	Derakula	makeup designer						
2016	Emkane Mina	makeup artist						
2015	The Other One's Dad	makeup designer						
2015	Shahrzad (TV series)							
2015	Mazar Sharif	makeup artist						
2015	Absolute Rest	makeup artist						
2015	Madar-e ghalb atomi	makeup artist						
2015	Azadi-ye mashroot	makeup artist						
2015	Wednesday, May 9	makeup artist						
2015	Closer	makeup designer						
2014	Saken Tabaghe Vasat	makeup designer						
2014	Arayesh-e ghaliz	makeup designer						
2014	Metropole	makeup designer						
2013	Hich Koja Hich Kas	makeup designer						
2013	Asemane Zarde Kam Omgh (Ehtemale Makoos)	makeup artist						
2012	The Queen	makeup artist						
2011	The Son of Dawn	makeup designer						
2011	The Maritime Silk Road (film)	makeup artist						
2010	The Kingdom of Solomon	makeup department head						
2009	Kalantari-e gheir-e entefai	makeup designer						
2009	Vaghti hame khaabim	makeup designer						
2009	Postchi se bar dar nemizanad	makeup designer						
2008	The Song of Sparrows	makeup artist						
	Prophet Joseph (TV series)	makeup artist						
2007	Barefoot in Heaven	makeup designer						
2006	The Last Queen of the Earth	makeup artist						
1997	Binavayan (TV Mini-Series)							
1992	Baz baran							
2014	Arayesh-e ghaliz	Producer						
2014	Biganeh	Producer						
2013	Asemane Zarde Kam Omgh (Ehtemale Makoos)	Producer						

=== Film ===
Year	Title	Makeup Designer	Makeup Artist	Producer	Screenwriter	Investor	Actor	Director
1988	Canary Yellow	No		No	No	No	Yes	Rakhshan Banietemad
2010	Here Without Me	Yes	Yes	No	No	No	No	Bahram Tavakoli
2013	Khanoom	Yes		No	No	No	No	Tina Pakravan
2014	Hard Makeup	Yes		Yes	No	Yes	No	Hamid Nematollah
2015	Parole	Yes		No	No	No	No	Hossein Mahkam
2015	Guinness	Yes		Yes	No	Yes	No	Mohsen Tanabandeh
2015	In Silence	No		Yes	No	Yes	No	Zharzh Hashemzadeh
2016	My Brother Khosrow	No		Yes	No	Yes	No	Ehsan Biglari
2016	Life and a Day	Yes		Yes	No	Yes	No	Saeed Roustayi
2017	Getting Even	No		Yes	No	Yes	No	Mostafa Ahmadi
2017	Hat-trick	Yes		No	No	No	No	Ramtin Lavafipour
2017	VillayiHa	Yes		Yes	No	Yes	No	Munir Gheidi
2018	The Lost Strait	Yes		Yes	No	No	No	Bahram Tavakoli
2018	Murphy's Law	Yes		No	No	No	No	Rambod Javan
2018	Rona, Azim's Mother	Yes		No	No	No	No	Jamshid Mahmoudi
2019	Gholamreza Takhti	Yes		Yes	Yes	No	No	Bahram Tavakoli
2021	Day Zero	No	Yes	Yes	No	No	No	Saeid Malekan

=== Home Video ===
Year	Title	Producer	Investor	Director	Notes
2019	Blue Whale	Yes	Yes	Fereydoun Jeyrani	distributed by Filimo
TBA	The Translator	Yes	TBA	Bahram Tavakoli	distributed by Namava

=== Television ===
Year	Title	Makeup Designer	Makeup Artist	Director	Network
2008–2009	Prophet Joseph	Yes	No	Farajollah Salahshoor	IRIB TV1
2008	In the Eye of the Wind	No	Yes	Masoud Jafari Jozani	IRIB TV1

== Awards ==
Year	Nominee / work	Award	Result
2018	The Lost Strait	Crystal Simorgh for Best Makeup Artist at the Fajr Film Festival	Won
2016	Life and a Day	Crystal Simorgh for Best Makeup Artist at the Fajr Film Festival	Won
2011	Alzheimer's	Crystal Simorgh for Best Makeup Artist at the Fajr Film Festival	Won
2011	Mother's Day	Crystal Simorgh for Best Makeup Artist at the Fajr Film Festival	Won
2010	The Kingdom of Solomon	Crystal Simorgh for Best Makeup Artist at the Fajr Film Festival	Won
2009	When We All Sleep	Crystal Simorgh for Best Makeup Artist at the Fajr Film Festival	Won
2008	The Song of Sparrows	Crystal Simorgh for Best Makeup Artist at the Fajr Film Festival	Won
