= Sakineh Peri =

First female physician and surgeon in Iran

Sakineh Peri or Sakineh Pari Hamedani (1902-1978), was an Iranian physician. She became the first female physician and surgeon in Iran in 1934.

Pari was the daughter of Nasrollah Hamedani. She may have been born in Russia, where she lived with her parents as a child. She studied medicin in Soviet Russia, where she graduated as a surgeon in 1933. She returned to Iran in 1934. The same year, she passed the test at the newly established University of Tehran Medical School and was licensed in Iran. She established a practice in the Caspian town of Bandar Gaz, where she spent most of her life.

She was the first female surgeon in Iran. She has also been called the first female physician in Iran, although the little known "Lady Dr. Kahhal", who is mentioned in 1910, may have been the first.
