= The Lost Strait =

- Film poster
- Directed by: Bahram Tavakoli
- Written by: Bahram Tavakoli
- Produced by: Saeid Malekan
- Starring: Amir Jadidi; Javad Ezzati; Hamid Reza Azarang; Mahdi Pakdel; Ali Soleimani
- Cinematography: Hamid Khozouie Abyane
- Edited by: Maysam Molaei
- Music by: Hamed Sabet
- Production company: Owj Arts and Media Organization
- Distributed by: Hozeh Honari
- Release dates: 1 February 2018 (Fajr Film Festival); 8 August 2018 (Iran)
- Running time: 95 minutes
- Country: Iran
- Language: Persian
- Box office: 5.6 billion toman (Iran)

The Lost Strait (Persian: تنگه ابوقریب, romanized: Tangeh-ye Abughoraib) is a 2018 Iranian war drama film written and directed by Bahram Tavakoli. The film screened for the first time at the 36th Fajr Film Festival and received 5 Awards and 6 nominations.

== Cast ==
- Amir Jadidi as Hassan
- Javad Ezzati as Majid
- Hamid Reza Azarang as Khalil
- Mahdi Pakdel as Reza
- Ali Soleimani as Aziz
- Mehdi Ghorbani as Ali
- Yadollah Shadmani as Habib
- Ghorban Najafi
- Banipal Shoomoon
- Milad Yazdani
- Mehdi Sabaghi

== Reception ==
=== Awards and nominations ===
Year	Award	Category	Recipient	Result
2018	Fajr Film Festival	Best Film	The Lost Strait	Won
2018	Fajr Film Festival	Audience Choice of Best Film	The Lost Strait	Runner-up
2018	Fajr Film Festival	Best Director	Bahram Tavakoli	Won
2018	Fajr Film Festival	Best Actor	Amir Jadidi	Won
2018	Fajr Film Festival	Best Makeup	Saeid Malekan	Won
2018	Fajr Film Festival	Special Effects	Mohsen Rouzbahani	Won
2018	Fajr Film Festival	Visual Effects	Mohsen Khirabadi & Mohammad Baradaran & Avad Matoori & Hassan Izadi	Nominated
2018	Fajr Film Festival	Best Cinematography	Hamid Khozouie Abyane	Nominated
2018	Fajr Film Festival	Best Sound Mixing	Rashid Daneshmand	Nominated
2018	Fajr Film Festival	Best Sound Editing	Amir Hossein Ghasemi	Nominated
2018	Fajr Film Festival	Production Design	Mohamadreza Shojaei	Nominated
2018	Fajr Film Festival	Best Original Score	Hamed Sabet	Nominated

== Summary of the film ==
This film, which is based on actual events and portrays the last days of the Iran-Iraq war, is a narrative of the defense of the Ammar Yaser Battalion of the 27th Division of Muhammad Rasulullah against the Baath regime's campaign in the strategic position of the Abu Ghraib Strait of Dehlran and the attack on Faqe and Sharhani in the final days of the war. The Iraqis have to cross the barrier of a base that is in the shape of a gorge, where they face strong resistance from the Iranian forces.
