= Javan (newspaper) =

Iranian newspaper

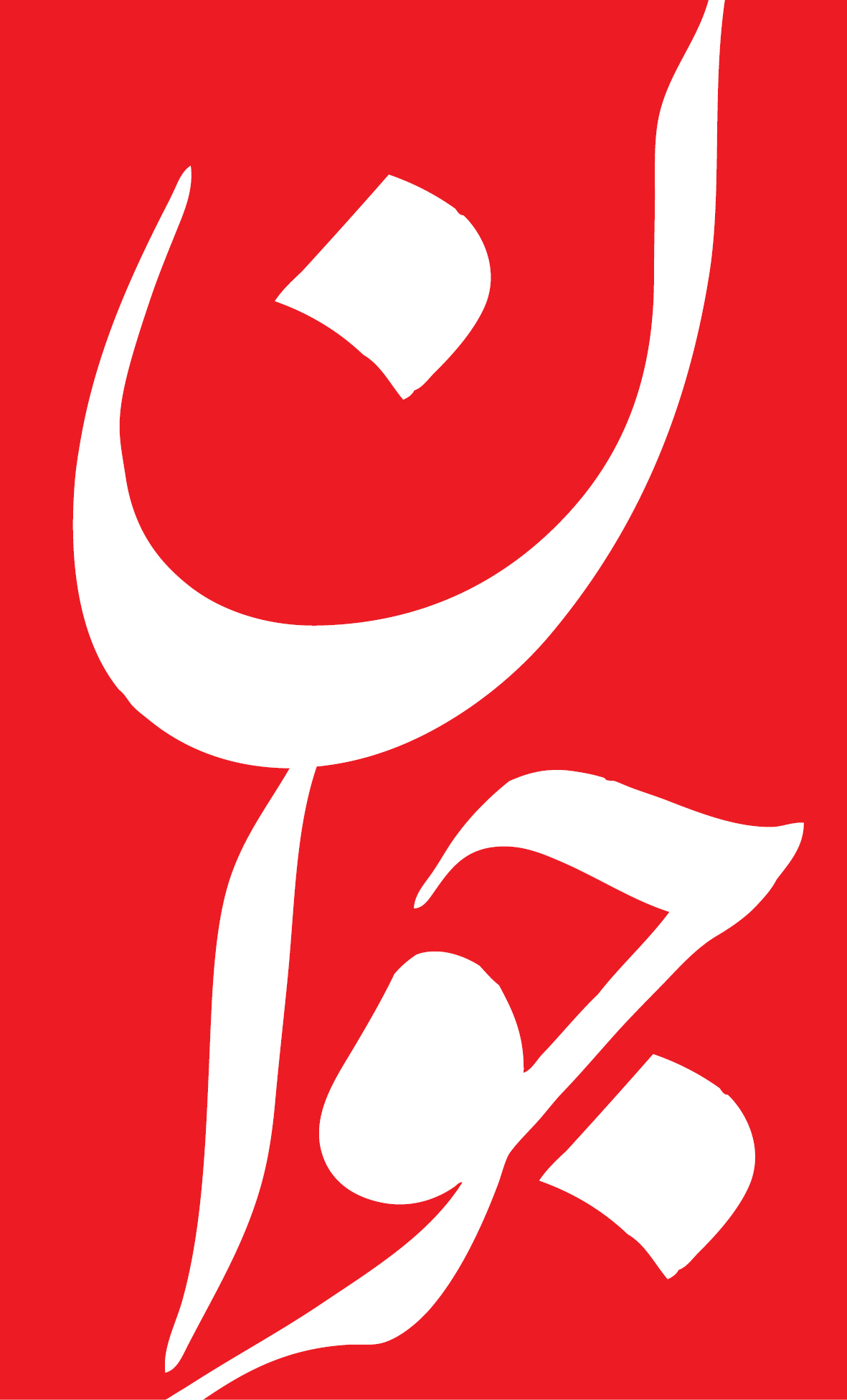
- Owner: Basij Cooperative Foundation
- Editor: Gholamreza Sadeghian
- Founded: 1998; 28 years ago
- Language: Persian
- Headquarters: Iran
- Website: www.javanonline.ir

Javan (Persian: جوان) is an Iranian newspaper affiliated to the Islamic Revolutionary Guard Corps (IRGC).

== History and management ==
Javan was founded in 1998 under the Payam Avarhan Nashr Rouz publishing house, a subsidiary of the Basij Cooperative Foundation which is in turn under the IRGC Cooperation Bonyad. A 2023 analysis by Tehran Bureau found that a "vast majority" of past and present board members had been IRGC commanders or employed by the Office of the Supreme Leader of Iran.

In 2018, managing editor Abdollah Ganji stated Javan earned revenue through newsstand sales, advertising, a publishing house and an annual subscription contract with the IRGC's Basij militia. Ganji also denied an organizational affiliation to the IRGC.

In December 2022, Javan was sanctioned by Canada, which described it as disseminating "anti-Semitic messaging and the Iranian regime’s propaganda".

== Content ==
Javan's editorial line is categorized as conservative or hardline. Tehran Bureau has described Javan as "written by and for the Basij militia", and as having undertaken disinformation campaigns against anti-government protesters and activists.
