= Mashregh News =

Iranian news website

Mashregh News (Persian: مشرق‌نیوز, lit. 'Eastern News') is a news website based in Tehran, Iran. PBS Frontline described it as "close to the security and intelligence organizations". Mashregh News often breaks stories of international interest.

The agency is known for censoring and altering news images. In 2011, when Sarah Shourd was released from an Iranian prison, Mashregh News blurred the areas of her breasts and arms in photos of her.

== History ==
In 2010, Mashregh News announced the 19 1/2-year prison sentence given to dissident Canadian-Iranian blogger Hossein Derakhshan. According to Mashregh News, Derakhshan was "convicted of cooperating with enemy states, making propaganda against the Islamic system of government, promoting small anti-revolutionary groups, managing obscene web sites and insulting Islamic sanctities".

In January, 2012, Mashregh News broke the story of the six-month prison sentence given to women's rights activist Faezeh Hashemi Rafsanjani, a former parliamentarian and daughter of former centrist president Akbar Hashemi Rafsanjani. She was also banned from politics for five years.

In 2012, Mashregh News published a report accusing the United States and the United Kingdom of collaborating with Zionists and Hollywood to promote homosexuality, as part of their plan for world domination. The report referred to Tel Aviv as the "gay paradise on Earth".

In January, 2013, Mashregh News reported the names of five Iranian journalists accused of being counterrevolutionaries, and "close to the plotters", terminology that the Iranian government uses to describe those working with its foreign opponents. Among the five were the editor-in-chief and two staffers for the reformist newspaper Etemaad, an editor for the newspaper Bahar, and an editor for the Iranian Labour News Agency.

The Anti-Defamation League has accused Mashregh News of Holocaust denial for spreading disinformation such as citing the false claim that Nazis "manufactured soap from their Jewish victims" as evidence that The Holocaust never happened.

In July 2016, the website reported Schlumberger developed Independent gas fields. The fields were located in Iran. In that same time, this company in Qatar developed gas fields, shared between Iran and Qatar.
