= Baran Kosari =

Iranian actress (born 1985)

- باران کوثری
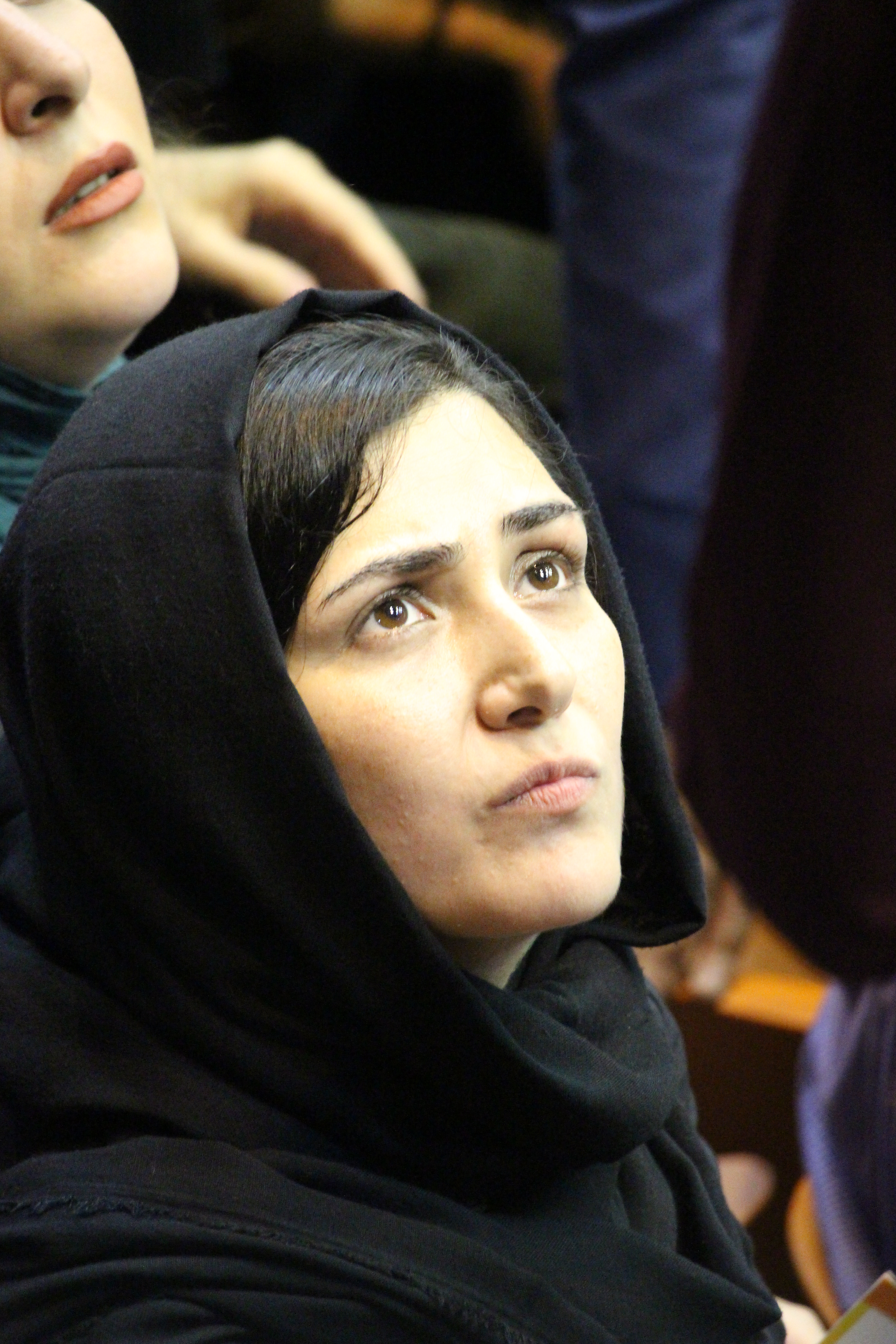
- Kosari in 2017
- Born: September 16, 1985 (age 40); Tehran, Iran
- Occupation: Actress
- Years active: 1991–present
- Parents: Jahangir Kosari (father); Rakhshan Bani-E'temad (mother)

Baran Kosari (Persian: باران کوثری;; born September 16, 1985) is an Iranian actress. Born to filmmakers Jahangir Kosari and Rakhshan Banietemad, she began her career with acting in the films of her mother. Kosari has received various accolades, including two Crystal Simorghs, two Hafez Awards, two Iran Cinema Celebration Awards and two Iran's Film Critics and Writers Association Awards.

== Career ==
She graduated from Soureh academy. The Best Papa of the World (1991) is her first acting experience. She had appearances in some of her mother's films, Nargess (1991), Rusari-ye Abi (The Blue-Veiled) (1994), May Lady (1997), Kish Stories (Rain and Ladsman episode - 1998), Under the Skin of the City (2000), Our Times (documentary - 2001). In 2007 she was nominated for the best performance by an actress in Asia Pacific Screen Award for her performance in Mainline.

Baran Kosari also ascertained her abilities as a theater actress with playing in Over the Mirror (1997), with Azita Hajian directing.

== Charity Work ==
Kosari has been introduced as the ambassador of the Yari Charity Association of Sweden in Iran. Yari is an independent, non-profit, and non-governmental organization that operates under the slogan "Fewer Street Children, More Students." The primary goal of this organization is to provide comprehensive support for children, create educational opportunities, and offer resources for schools and libraries in underprivileged areas. This initiative is backed by voluntary financial support from sponsors in Sweden.

== Filmography ==
=== Film ===
Year	Title	Role	Director	Notes
1991	The Best Papa of the World	Sara		
1991	Narges			
1995	The Blue Veiled	Senoubar		
1997	May Lady	Senoubar		
1999	Stories of Island (Episode of Baran and Bumi)	Baran		
2000	Under the Skin of the City	Mahboobeh		
2000	Under the Skin of the Rain	Baran		Documentary
2001	Our Time			Documentary
2002	Dancing in the Dust	Reyhaneh		
2003	Winning Card	Barekat		
2004	Girls Dormitory	Roya		
2004		Maygol		
2005	Crossroad	Mahsa		
2005	Central Margin			Documentary
2005				
2006	Magical Generation	Avishan		
2006	Mainline	Sara		
2006	The Third Day	Samire		
2007	Compulsive Success	Simin		
2007	The Silly			Short film
2007	Sweet			Documentary
2007	Tambourine	Shirin		
2007	White Sneaker	Zivar		
2008	The Black Sky of the Night	Carol		Documentary
2008				Short film
2008	The Postman doesn't knock three Times	Sara		
2008	Perplexity	Mahi		
2008	Myzak	Titi		
2009	50 kg of Cherry			
2009	Nothing	Yekta		
2009	Please Do Not Disturb	Roushanak		
2009	Puzzle (Paria's Story)	Paria		
2009	Absolutely Tame Is a Horse	Nastaran		
2011	A Cube of Sugar	Grooms relative	Reza Mirkarimi	
2012	Im A Mother	Ava	Fereydoun Jeyrani	
2012	Hatred	Zhaleh	Reza Dormishian	
2012	Laboratory	Niloofar Paknezhad		
2014	I'm Not Angry!	Setareh	Reza Dormishian	
2015	A Persian Melody	Gohar	Hamid Reza Ghotbi	
2015	The Nameless Alley	Mohadeseh	Hatef Alimardani	
2016	Lantouri	Baroon	Reza Dormishian	
2016	Haft Mahegi	Raana	Hatef Alimardani	
2017	Blockage		Mohsen Gharaee	
2018	Cold Sweat	Afrouz Ardestani	Soheil Beiraghi	
2018	Astigmatism	Samira	Majid Reza Mostavafi	
2018	The Last Fiction	Mandana (voice)	Ashkan Rahgozar	
2019	Alive	Asma	Hossein Amiri Doomari, Pedram Pouramiri	
2019	Numbness	Mary	Hossein Mahkam	
2019	Repression	Malihe	Reza Goran	
2020	The Slaughterhouse	Asra	Abbas Amini	
2020	Unpopular	Afsaneh Shirkhodaee	Soheil Beiraghi	
2021	Punch Drunk	Mahtab	Adel Tabrizi	
2021	Majority	Noori	Mohsen Gharaee	
2022	Won't You Cry?		Alireza Motamedi	
2022	The Wastetown	Bemani	Ahmad Bahrami	
TBA	Blue Veins: Forough Farrokhzad	Forough Farrokhzad	Jahangir Kosari	

=== Web ===
Year	Title	Role	Director	Platform
2016	Golden Tooth	Tolou	Davood Mirbagheri	
2021	Queen of Beggars	Afra Babaee	Hossein Soheilizadeh	Filimo
2022–2024	Women's Secret Network	Parvin Etesami, Varto Terian, Iran Teymourtash, Parkhideh, Nosratolmolouk Kashanchi, Satenik Aghababian, Nimtaj Selmasi, Sakineh Pari, Marie Curie	Afshin Hashemi	Namava
2022	Chameleons	Mehri Giraraee	Borzou Niknejad	Filmnet

=== Television ===
year	title in English	title in Persian	role
1998	Let the Sun Rises	'Bogzar Aftab Barayad'	
2006	Saints	'Sahebdelan'	Dina
2009	Red Hat 09	'Kolah Ghermezi 88'	Aunt Baran

== Theater ==
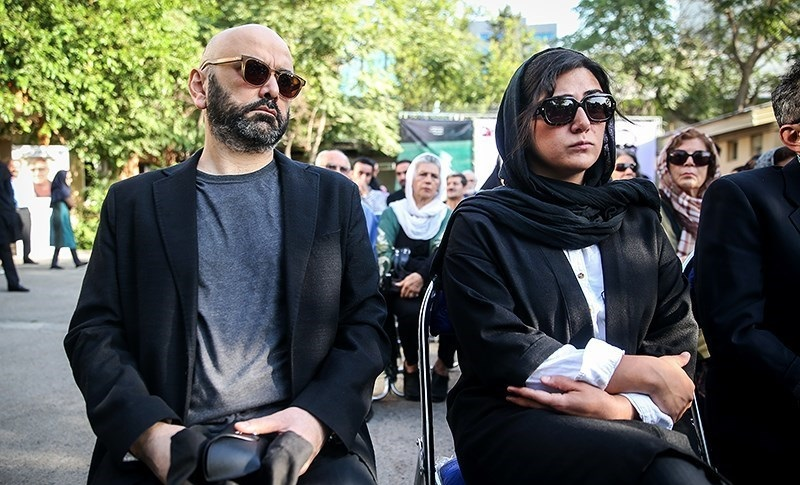
Kosari in Funeral of Abbas Kiarostami

year	title in English	title in Persian	role
1997	The other Side of the Mirror	'An Su-ye Ayene'	
2005	Amid the Clouds	'Dar Miyan-e Abrha'	
2007	Quartet: A Journey North	'Quartet'	Negar
2009	Dog-Silence	'Sag-sokut'	Child
2010		'Shahrzad'	
2010	Butterflies	'Parvaneha'	
2010	Minus Two	'Menha-ye do'	
2011		'Zemestane 66'	
2011		'Khoshksali va Dorough'	
2015		'Shab aavazhayash ra Mikhanad'	

== Awards and nominations ==
- Nominated for Hafez Award for Best Actress in a Motion Picture for The Wastetown (2022) in 2024
- Won Crystal Simorgh / Best Actress / 33rd Fajr International Film Festival / The Nameless Alley - 2015
- Nominated Crystal Simorgh / Best Actress / 30rd Fajr International Film Festival / Hatred - 2012
- Best Actress / 1st National Young Iranian Film Festival / Ablah - 2010
- Best Actress / 11th Iran Cinema Celebration / Mainline - 2007
- Nominated Crystal Simorgh / Best Actress / 27th Fajr International Film Festival / Heyran - 2009
- Won Crystal Simorgh / Best Actress / 25th Fajr International Film Festival / Mainline and The Third Day - 2007
- Best Actress / 11th House of Cinema / Mainline - 2008
- Honorary Diploma / Best Actress / 25th International Fajr Film Festival / Mainline - 2007
- Nominated Asia Pacific Screen Awards / Best Actress / Mainline - 2007
- Best Teenage Actress / Critic Choose / Baran-o-Bumi and Under the Skin of the City - 2000

== Other activities ==
- Screenwriter (Ablah - 2007)
- Secretary of Scene (Gilaneh - 2004)
- Festival Arbiter, 17th Teenage Film Festival (Isfahan - 2002)

== See also ==
- List of Iranian actresses
