= Leyli Rashidi =

Iranian actress (born 1973)

- لیلی رشیدی
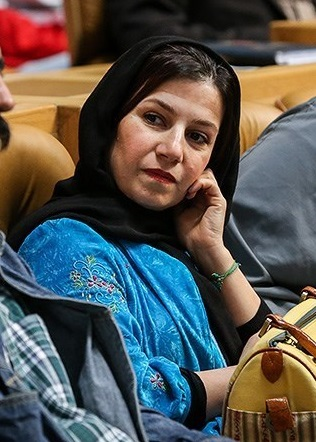
- Born: 2 February 1973 (age 53); Tehran, Iran
- Occupation: Actress
- Years active: 1991–present
- Spouses: Nima Banki (div.); Mehrdad Ahmadzade (2025 - so far)
- Children: 1
- Parent(s): Davoud Rashidi (father); Ehteram Boroumand (mother)
- Relatives: Farhad Rachidi (brother); Marzieh Boroumand (aunt)

Leyli Rashidi (Persian: لیلی رشیدی; born 2 February 1973) is an Iranian actress. As the daughter of Iranian actor and film director Davoud Rashidi, she started acting from early ages of childhood.

She received a Canadian Screen Award nomination for Best Supporting Performance in a Film at the 11th Canadian Screen Awards in 2023, for her performance in the film Summer with Hope.

On 3 February 2026, Rashidi was among several figures in the Iranian film industry who signed a statement supporting the 2025–2026 Iranian protests and condemning the government's response to them.

== Filmography ==
- 2002 - Without Description
- 2005 - Top of the Tower
- 2005 - Dar- be-darha
- 2008 - Shirin
- 2017 - Ava
- 2022 - Summer with Hope
- 2024 - Boomerang
- 2025 - Bidad
