= Bahram Tavakoli (film director) =

Iranian film director and screenwriter

- بهرام توکلی
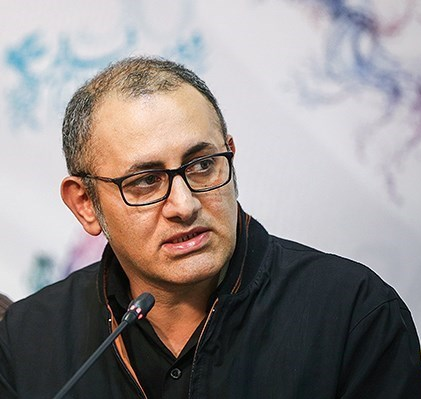
- Born: 25 November 1976 (age 49); Hamedan, Iran
- Occupations: Film director, screenwriter
- Years active: 1997–present
- Notable work: Here Without Me; I am Diego Maradona; The Lost Strait

Bahram Tavakoli (born 1976) is an Iranian film director and screenwriter. He won a Crystal Simorgh award for his debut film Barefoot in Heaven (2007). Since then, he has released several films that have met with critical acclaim.

== Filmography ==
=== Film ===
Year	Title	Screenwriter	Director
2001	Red Mind (half long)	Yes	Bahram Tavakoli
2007	Barefoot In Heaven	Yes	Bahram Tavakoli
2010	A Walk in the Fog	Yes	Bahram Tavakoli
2011	Here Without Me	Yes	Bahram Tavakoli
2013	The Shallow Yellow Sky	Yes	Bahram Tavakoli
2014	The Strenger	Yes	Bahram Tavakoli
2015	I Am Diego Maradona	Yes	Bahram Tavakoli
2015	Closer	Yes	Mostafa Ahmadi
2018	The Lost Strait	Yes	Bahram Tavakoli
2019	Gholamreza Takhti	Yes	Bahram Tavakoli

=== Home Video ===
Year	Title	Screenwriter	Director	Notes
2019	Blue Whale	Yes	Fereydoun Jeyrani	distributed by Filimo
TBA	The Translator	Yes	Bahram Tavakoli	distributed by Namava

=== Television series ===
Year	Title	Screenwriter	Director	Network	Notes
2016	Standardized Patient	Yes	Saeed Aghakhani	IRIB TV1	
2021	Noon Khe	Yes	Saeed Aghakhani	IRIB TV1	Season 3
