= Marsh (Tasian) =

2025 episode of Tasian

- Tasian episode
- Episode no.: Season 1 Episode 6
- Directed by: Tina Pakravan
- Written by: Tina Pakravan
- Original release date: March 20, 2025
- Running time: 47 minutes

Episode chronology
← Previous "The Second Possibility"	Next → "Mother's Day"

"Marsh" is the sixth episode of the Iranian historical drama series Tasian. The episode was released on the Filimo streaming platform on March 20, 2025. It was written and directed by Tina Pakravan. The episode follows the aftermath of Shirin Nejat's broken engagement, as her father Jamshid forbids her from leaving the house. Meanwhile, Amir Yousefinia searches for a way to meet Shirin.

== Plot ==
Following the breakdown of Shirin Nejat's engagement, her father, Jamshid Nejat, becomes determined to prevent her from leaving the family home. The consequences of the failed engagement place Shirin under increasing restrictions and further complicate her relationship with Amir Yousefinia.

Amir continues trying to find a way to meet Shirin despite the restrictions imposed on her. His attempts to reach her become increasingly difficult as the Nejat family's internal tensions grow. The episode focuses on the separation between Amir and Shirin and the obstacles created by Shirin's family following the collapse of her engagement.

== Production ==
The episode was written and directed by Tina Pakravan. Filimo's official announcement for the episode identifies Pakravan as both the screenwriter and director.

=== Casting ===
The episode stars Hootan Shakiba as Amir Yousefinia and Mahsa Hejazi as Shirin Nejat. The cast also includes Babak Hamidian as Jamshid Nejat, Saber Abar as Saeed, Pantea Panahiha as Homa Nejat, Nazanin Bayati as Maryam Saman, Mehran Modiri as Dr. Rajabzadeh, Mohammad Reza Ghaffari as Shahram Salar, Reza Behboudi as Manoochehr Saman, Majid Yousefi as Omid Yousefinia, Nasrin Nosrati as Ghodsi, Atefeh Razavi as Shokooh, Shahram Ghaedi as Mohsen, Mohammad Reza Sharifinia as Reza Yousefinia, Majid Mozaffari as Raeis, Mehrdad Niknam as Timsar Salar, Amir Hossein Sedigh as the head of the printing house, Pouria Shakibaei as Nader, and Maedeh Tahmasebi as Nazi. Reyhaneh Razi appears as Houri Malekshahi.

== Release ==
"Marsh" was released on Filimo on March 20, 2025. The episode was promoted by Filimo as the sixth installment of Tasian, with the platform announcing its release for 8:00 a.m. The official announcement referred to the episode by its Persian title, "مرداب" (Marsh), and identified Tina Pakravan as its writer and director.

IMDb lists the episode as the sixth episode of the first season and gives its release date as March 20, 2025. The episode received a user rating of approximately 7.4/10 on IMDb at the time of access.

== Reception ==
The episode received discussion in Persian-language media and online reviews, with attention focused on the continuing romantic conflict between Amir and Shirin and the restrictions imposed on Shirin following the collapse of her engagement. A review published shortly after the episode's release described the episode as further complicating Amir and Shirin's relationship while highlighting the period setting and performances of the main cast.

On IMDb, "Marsh" had a user rating of approximately 7.4/10 from around 390 ratings at the time of access, placing it among the more highly rated episodes of the first season.
