= The Second Possibility (Tasian) =

2025 episode of Tasian

- Tasian episode
- Episode no.: Season 1 Episode 5
- Directed by: Tina Pakravan
- Written by: Tina Pakravan
- Original release date: March 14, 2025
- Running time: 46 minutes

Episode chronology
| ← Previous "Khosrow and Shirin" | Next → "Marsh" |

"The Second Possibility" is the fifth episode of the Iranian historical drama series Tasian. The episode was released on the Filimo streaming platform on March 14, 2025. It was written and directed by Tina Pakravan and produced by Ali Asadzadeh. The episode follows the aftermath of Amir Yousefinia and Shirin Nejat's interrogation, as the two are unable to find each other afterward. Meanwhile, Shahram formally proposes to Shirin, creating a new complication in her relationship with Amir.

== Plot ==
Following the interrogation in the previous episode, Amir Yousefinia and Shirin Nejat are unable to find each other. Their separation creates uncertainty surrounding the relationship that has developed between them, while Amir continues to look for an opportunity to meet Shirin. The episode explores the consequences of their encounter and the difficulties created by Amir's position within SAVAK.

Meanwhile, Shahram formally proposes to Shirin. The proposal places Shirin in a difficult position as her relationship with Amir remains unresolved. The episode consequently develops the romantic conflict between Amir, Shirin, and Shahram while continuing the series' broader story surrounding the Nejat family and the political circumstances of the period.

== Production ==
The episode was directed and written by Tina Pakravan. The series was produced by Ali Asadzadeh. Tasian is set in Tehran in the late 1970s, before the Iranian Revolution, and combines a romantic storyline with political and social events of the period. The fifth episode continues the series' focus on the developing relationship between Amir and Shirin while expanding the conflict surrounding Shirin's prospective marriage.

=== Casting ===
The episode stars Hootan Shakiba as Amir Yousefinia and Mahsa Hejazi as Shirin Nejat. The supporting cast includes Babak Hamidian as Jamshid Nejat, Mehran Modiri as Dr. Rajabzadeh, Mohammad Reza Ghaffari as Reza Yousefinia, Reza Behboudi as Manouchehr Saman, Nasrin Nosrati as Ghodsi, Afshin Hassanloo as Babak, Nazanin Bayati as Maryam Saman, Pantea Panahiha as Homa Saman, Saber Abar as Saeed, Majid Yousefi as Omid Yousefinia, Majid Mozaffari as Saeed's boss, Shahram Ghaedi as Mohsen, Atefeh Razavi as Shokouh, Amir Hossein Seddigh as the head of the printing house, Pouria Shakibaei as Nader, Mehrdad Niknam as Timsar Salar, Mohammad Shiri as Jafar, and Maede Tahmasbi as Nazi.

== Release ==
"The Second Possibility" was released on Filimo on March 14, 2025. The episode followed "Khosrow and Shirin" and was released after the temporary suspension of Tasian following its first three episodes. Filimo announced the fifth episode through its official channel as the next installment of the series, identifying Tina Pakravan as both its writer and director.

The episode has been listed with a runtime of approximately 47 minutes by episode databases.

== Reception ==
The fifth episode was included in contemporary discussion of Tasian and its depiction of the Pahlavi period and SAVAK. Later criticism of the series included comments from film critic Masoud Farasati, who argued that the portrayal of SAVAK became increasingly stylized and unrealistic from around the fifth and sixth episodes. Farasati described the depiction as overly idealized and criticized the series for presenting a fictionalized image of the organization.

On IMDb, "The Second Possibility" has been rated by users as one of the episodes of the first season, with the episode receiving a lower user rating than "Khosrow and Shirin" at the time of the site's listing.
