= Lucky Ticket (Tasian) =

2025 episode of Tasian

- Tasian episode
- Episode no.: Season 1 Episode 3
- Directed by: Tina Pakravan
- Written by: Tina Pakravan
- Original release date: February 21, 2025
- Running time: 52 minutes

Episode chronology
← Previous "I Don't Love Her"	Next → "Khosrow and Shirin"

"Lucky Ticket" is the third episode of the Iranian historical drama series Tasian. The episode was released on the Filimo streaming platform on February 21, 2025. It continues the story of Amir Yousefinia (played by Hootan Shakiba) and Shirin Nejat (played by Mahsa Hejazi). In this episode, Amir, who has entered the Pahlavi-era security organization SAVAK because of his fixation on Shirin, approaches her but discovers that Wednesday is the day of her formal proposal (engagement) to another man. This revelation intensifies the conflict between Amir’s romantic aspirations and the social conventions surrounding Shirin.

== Plot ==
Amir Yousefinia continues his pursuit of Shirin Nejat after their encounter in the printing house. By this episode, Amir is entangled with SAVAK as a means to be closer to Shirin. The official summary describes that Amir has entered SAVAK on Shirin’s account, but when he finally goes to approach her, he finds out that Wednesday is the day of her engagement ceremony. Amir attends Shirin’s engagement gathering and realizes that she is committed to someone else. The episode depicts Amir’s reaction to this news and how it further complicates his plans. Meanwhile, Shirin’s family is busy preparing for her upcoming marriage, highlighting the differences in their social circumstances (Shirin’s affluent family versus Amir’s working-class background) and setting up the emotional stakes for the series.

== Production ==
The episode was directed and written by Tina Pakravan. The series was produced by Ali Asadzadeh. Tasian is set in Tehran in the late 1970s, before the Iranian Revolution, and blends a romantic storyline with the political and social events of the period. Tina Pakravan has said the series explores a nostalgic, idealized view of that era and its nationalistic sentiments.

=== Casting ===
The episode stars Hootan Shakiba as Amir Yousefinia and Mahsa Hejazi as Shirin Nejat. The supporting cast includes Babak Hamidian as Jamshid Nejat, Saber Abar as Saeed, Pantea Panahiha as Homa, Nazanin Bayati as Maryam Saman, and Mehran Modiri as Dr. Rajabzadeh. Additional cast members appearing in this episode include Mohammad-Reza Sharifinia as an associate of Shirin’s family, Majid Mozaffari as Saeed’s boss, Shahram Ghaedi as Mohsen, Atefeh Razavi as Shokouh, Mohammad Reza Ghaffari as Reza Yousefinia (Amir’s father), Majid Yousefi as Omid Yousefinia, Reza Behboudi as Manouchehr Saman, Nasrin Nosrati as Ghodsi, Amir Hossein Seddigh as the printing house head, Pouria Shakibaei as Nader, Afshin Hasanloo as Shahram, Mehrdad Niknam as Timsar Salar, Mohammad Shiri as Jafar, and Maedeh Tahmasbi as Nazi. The presence of many popular Iranian actors in this episode, as noted in Persian media, helped draw attention to the series.

== Release ==
"Lucky Ticket" premiered on Filimo in Iran on February 21, 2025. The platform’s promotional materials noted that the episode would be available starting Friday at 8:00 a.m., following the weekly release schedule. The episode, like others in the series, is about 52 minutes long. It was followed by the fourth episode, "Khosrow and Shirin", which was released one week later on February 28, 2025.

== Reception ==
As with earlier episodes of Tasian, Persian commentators focused largely on the series’ historical representation. In particular, critics noted the portrayal of the Pahlavi-era security organization SAVAK. For example, Azadisq magazine observed that Tasian depicts SAVAK officers as unusually lenient and culturally refined – a portrayal that diverges sharply from historical accounts and has drawn criticism for downplaying the regime’s repressive actions. The episode itself became part of a broader discussion about the show’s nostalgic view of the 1970s, although specific critical reviews of this third episode remain limited.
