= Destiny (Tasian) =

2025 episode of Tasian

- Tasian episode
- Episode no.: Season 1 Episode 10
- Directed by: Tina Pakravan
- Written by: Tina Pakravan
- Original release date: April 18, 2025
- Running time: 47 minutes

Episode chronology
← Previous "Red Line"	Next → "Little Black Fish"

"Destiny" is the tenth episode of the Iranian historical drama series Tasian. It was written and directed by Tina Pakravan and produced by Ali Asadzadeh. The episode premiered on the Filimo streaming platform on April 18, 2025. As Amir Yousefinia attempts to remain by Shirin Nejat's side, an unexpected encounter brings him face to face with Omid, altering the course of events.

== Plot ==
In the aftermath of Manouchehr Saman's death, Amir tries to stay close to Shirin during a difficult period for both families. However, fate unexpectedly brings Amir and Omid together at the very moment Amir hopes to support Shirin. Their meeting complicates Amir's plans and introduces new tensions into the relationships among the principal characters.

The episode continues to explore the consequences of recent events while advancing both the romantic and family storylines. Amir's determination to remain close to Shirin is increasingly challenged by circumstances beyond his control, reinforcing the episode's central theme of destiny.

== Production ==
The episode was written and directed by Tina Pakravan and produced by Ali Asadzadeh. Like the rest of the series, it forms part of Tasian, a historical romantic drama set in Tehran during the final years of the Pahlavi dynasty.

=== Casting ===
The episode stars Hootan Shakiba as Amir Yousefinia, Mahsa Hejazi as Shirin Nejat, Babak Hamidian as Jamshid Nejat, Saber Abar as Saeed, Nazanin Bayati as Maryam Saman, Pantea Panahiha as Homa Nejat, Mehran Modiri as Dr. Rajabzadeh, Reza Behboudi as Manouchehr Saman, and Majid Yousefi as Omid Yousefinia.

== Release ==
"Destiny" premiered on Filimo on April 18, 2025, as the tenth episode of the first season of Tasian. It has a runtime of 47 minutes and continued the series' weekly Friday release schedule.

== Reception ==
At the time of access, "Destiny" held an IMDb user rating of approximately 7.2/10. Contemporary discussion of the episode focused primarily on the continuing development of Amir and Shirin's relationship and the introduction of new conflicts arising from Amir's encounter with Omid, although dedicated critical reviews of the episode remained limited.
