= Red Line (Tasian) =

2025 episode of Tasian

- Tasian episode
- Episode no.: Season 1 Episode 9
- Directed by: Tina Pakravan
- Written by: Tina Pakravan
- Original release date: April 11, 2025
- Running time: 57 minutes

Episode chronology
| ← Previous "Farewell to the Gun" | Next → "Destiny" |

"Red Line" is the ninth episode of the Iranian historical drama series Tasian. It was written and directed by Tina Pakravan and produced by Ali Asadzadeh. The episode premiered on the Filimo streaming platform on April 11, 2025. It follows the aftermath of Manouchehr Saman's sudden death, as Amir Yousefinia attempts to arrange the minimum requirements for his burial while the Nejat family struggles with the shock of the loss.

== Plot ==
The sudden death of Manouchehr Saman leaves the Nejat family in mourning and creates further uncertainty within the family. As those closest to Manouchehr struggle to come to terms with the loss, Amir Yousefinia assumes responsibility for arranging the minimum requirements for his burial despite the difficult circumstances surrounding the family.

The episode explores the emotional consequences of Manouchehr's death while continuing the tensions between Amir, Shirin Nejat, and the members of the Nejat family. The tragedy also affects the broader relationships among the principal characters, further advancing the dramatic and political conflicts established earlier in the series.

== Production ==
The episode was written and directed by Tina Pakravan and produced by Ali Asadzadeh. As with the rest of the series, it was filmed as part of Tasian, a historical romance set in Tehran during the final years of the Pahlavi dynasty before the Iranian Revolution.

=== Casting ===
The principal cast includes Hootan Shakiba as Amir Yousefinia, Mahsa Hejazi as Shirin Nejat, Babak Hamidian as Jamshid Nejat, Saber Abar as Saeed, Nazanin Bayati as Maryam Saman, Pantea Panahiha as Homa Nejat, Reyhaneh Razi as Houri Malekshahi, and Mehran Modiri as Dr. Rajabzadeh.

== Release ==
"Red Line" premiered on Filimo on April 11, 2025, as the ninth episode of the first season of Tasian. The episode has a runtime of 57 minutes and continued the series' weekly Friday release schedule.

== Reception ==
At the time of access, the episode held a user rating of 7.2/10 on IMDb. User reviews described the episode as a significant turning point in the narrative, highlighting its emotional impact following Manouchehr's death and the progression of the central characters' relationships, although dedicated critical reviews of the episode were limited.
