= Mother's Day (Tasian) =

2025 episode of Tasian

- Tasian episode
- Episode no.: Season 1 Episode 7
- Directed by: Tina Pakravan
- Written by: Tina Pakravan
- Original release date: March 28, 2025
- Running time: 53 minutes

Episode chronology
← Previous "Marsh"	Next → "Farewell to the Gun"

"Mother's Day" is the seventh episode of the Iranian historical drama series Tasian. The episode was released on the Filimo streaming platform on March 28, 2025. It was written and directed by Tina Pakravan and produced by Ali Asadzadeh. The episode follows Amir Yousefinia as he becomes frustrated with both the owner of the printing house, who has betrayed him, and Jamshid Nejat, who has confined his daughter Shirin to the family home. Amir subsequently searches for a way to move forward and meet Shirin.

== Plot ==
Following the events surrounding Shirin Nejat's broken engagement, Jamshid Nejat continues to keep his daughter confined to the family home. Amir Yousefinia, who is already struggling to find a way to see Shirin, becomes increasingly frustrated by the circumstances separating them.

Amir is also angered by the owner of the printing house, whom he believes has betrayed him. With both the printing-house conflict and Jamshid's treatment of Shirin standing in his way, Amir searches for a solution that could allow him to change his situation and reconnect with Shirin. The episode continues to develop the conflict between Amir and the Nejat family while maintaining the series' romantic and political storylines.

== Production ==
The episode was written and directed by Tina Pakravan and produced by Ali Asadzadeh. Tasian is set in Tehran in the late 1970s, before the Iranian Revolution, and combines a romantic storyline with political and social events of the period.

=== Casting ===
The episode stars Hootan Shakiba as Amir Yousefinia, Mahsa Hejazi as Shirin Nejat, and Babak Hamidian as Jamshid Nejat. The supporting cast includes Saber Abar as Saeed, Nazanin Bayati as Maryam Saman, Pantea Panahiha as Homa Nejat, Reyhaneh Razi as Houri Malekshahi, Reza Behboudi as Manouchehr Saman, and Mehran Modiri as Dr. Rajabzadeh.

IMDbPro lists nine credited cast members for the episode, including Shakiba, Hejazi, Hamidian, Abar, Bayati, Panahiha, Razi, Behboudi and Modiri.

== Release ==
"Mother's Day" was released on Filimo on March 28, 2025. Filimo's official episode page identifies it as the seventh episode of the first season and gives the Persian title as "روز مادر" (Mother's Day). Its official synopsis states that Amir is angry with the printing-house owner who betrayed him and with Jamshid Nejat for confining his daughter, and that he searches for a way out of the situation.

IMDb lists the episode as the seventh episode of the first season and records its Iranian release date as March 28, 2025.

== Reception ==
"Mother's Day" was rated 7.4/10 on IMDb at the time of access, based on approximately 390 user ratings. The episode's rating was comparable to those of the preceding episodes in the first season.

The episode was also included in contemporary audience discussion of Tasian through user reviews and ratings, although substantial English-language critical coverage specifically devoted to the seventh episode is limited.
