= Ten Nights (Tasian) =

2025 episode of Tasian

- Tasian episode
- Episode no.: Season 1 Episode 1
- Directed by: Tina Pakravan
- Written by: Tina Pakravan
- Original release date: February 7, 2025
- Running time: 55 minutes

Episode chronology
← Previous —	Next → "I Don't Love Her"

"Ten Nights" is the first episode of the Iranian television series Tasian. The episode was written and directed by Tina Pakravan and was released on Filimo in Iran on February 7, 2025. It has a runtime of 55 minutes.

The episode introduces Hootan Shakiba as Amir Yousefinia and Mahsa Hejazi as Shirin Nejat, whose relationship becomes the central romantic storyline of the series. The story begins when Shirin visits the printing house where Amir works, leading him to realize that the paintings that had fascinated him depict Shirin herself.

== Plot ==
The episode opens during the night, when workers at Manouchehr Saman's house are seen digging a hole. The sequence creates an atmosphere of mystery before the story shifts to the lives of the main characters.

Shirin Nejat is introduced as a university student studying literature at the University of Tehran. She comes from a wealthy Tehran family and is involved in designing and illustrating book covers. Her father, Jamshid Nejat, is a successful factory owner and is deeply protective of her.

Amir Yousefinia comes from a working-class and traditional family and works at a printing house responsible for printing publications. A problem with the printing of the cover of one of Shirin's books brings the two characters into contact.

When Shirin enters the printing house to address the printing problem, Amir realizes that the paintings he has admired are portraits of Shirin, the artist who created them. He becomes immediately fascinated by her, and his imagined romantic ideal is suddenly embodied in the woman standing before him.

The encounter establishes Amir's interest in Shirin and introduces the social and economic difference between the two characters. The episode also introduces members of the Nejat and Saman families, as well as Amir's family and several characters connected to the university, printing house and political environment surrounding the story.

== Production ==
=== Development ===
Tasian was written and directed by Tina Pakravan and produced by Ali Asadzadeh. The series is a historical drama and romance set in Iran during the period preceding the Iranian Revolution. The story begins in 1977 and follows the relationship between Shirin, a young woman from a wealthy family, and Amir, a young man from a working-class family.

The series' production credits list Peyman Shadmanfar as director of photography, Mohammad Najarian as editor, Soroush Entezami as composer, Iraj Raminfar as production designer, Elham Moein as costume designer, Babak Eskandari as makeup designer, Alireza Alavian as sound designer and Farid Nazer-Fasihi as visual effects designer.

=== Casting ===
The episode stars Hootan Shakiba as Amir Yousefinia and Mahsa Hejazi as Shirin Nejat. Babak Hamidian portrays Shirin's father, Jamshid Nejat, while Mohammad Reza Ghaffari plays Reza Yousefinia. Other credited performers in the episode include Reza Behboudi as Manouchehr Saman, Nasrin Nosrati as Ghodsi, Nazanin Bayati as Maryam Saman, Pantea Panahiha as Homa Nejat, Saber Abar as Saeed, Majid Yousefi as Omid Yousefinia, Mehran Modiri as Dr. Rajabzadeh and Amir Hossein Seddigh as the head of the printing house.

Additional credited cast members include Pouria Shakibaei as Nader, Mehrdad Niknam as Timsar Salar, Mohammad Shiri as Jafar, Maedeh Tahmasbi as Nazi, Mohammad Aghebati as Shahram's uncle, Khashayar Rad as Saeed's father, Banafsheh Riazi as Sepideh, Ahmad-Reza Hashemi as Arash, Reyhaneh Razi as Houri Malekshahi, Deniz Danesh as Pari Ashtiani and Mary Catherine Mason as Janet.

=== Filming and visual effects ===
The series' cinematography was handled by Peyman Shadmanfar. Visual effects were supervised by Farid Nazer-Fasihi, with EEFA Studio among the companies involved in the series' visual-effects production.

== Release ==
"Ten Nights" was released in Iran on February 7, 2025, on Filimo. It was the first episode of the series and was followed by "I Don't Love Her" on February 14, 2025.

The episode has a listed runtime of 55 minutes on IMDb and is categorized as drama, history and romance.

== Reception ==
On IMDb, "Ten Nights" has a rating of 7.5/10 based on more than 500 user ratings as of July 2026.

A Persian-language review of the episode praised its opening sequence for establishing a mysterious and suspenseful atmosphere. The review also highlighted the introduction of Shirin and the printing-house incident as effective devices for establishing the central relationship between Shirin and Amir. It noted the episode's references to the cultural and political atmosphere of 1970s Iran, including references to filmmakers Bahram Beyzai and Abbas Kiarostami.
