= I Don't Love Her (Tasian) =

2025 episode of Tasian

- Tasian episode
- Episode no.: Season 1 Episode 2
- Directed by: Tina Pakravan
- Written by: Tina Pakravan
- Original release date: February 14, 2025
- Running time: 55 minutes

Episode chronology
← Previous "Ten Nights"	Next → "Lucky Ticket"

"I Don't Love Her" is the second episode of the Iranian historical romance television series Tasian. Written and directed by Tina Pakravan, it premiered on the Filimo streaming service on February 14, 2025. The episode continues the central story of Amir Yousefinia (played by Hootan Shakiba) and Shirin Nejat (Mahsa Hejazi). Amir, now certain that Shirin is the woman of his dreams, takes a drastic step to win her over. His actions bring him into the orbit of SAVAK, the Shah’s security service, and lead to Shirin’s arrest and interrogation. These developments expand the series’ portrayal of the late-1970s political backdrop.

== Plot ==
Amir Yousefinia, a young worker at a Tehran printing house, has become smitten with Shirin Nejat after their first encounter. According to Filimo’s official synopsis and reviews, Amir is “determined to do something unusual” to gain Shirin’s attention. He befriends her through his job, believing she is the figure from his romantic dreams. By episode’s end, Amir’s infatuation has embroiled him in the regime’s security apparatus: he is detained by agents of SAVAK and joins the organization under Shirin’s influence, while Shirin herself is arrested and interrogated by security forces. The episode thus contrasts Amir’s humble background with Shirin’s privileged life and sets the stage for the series’ mix of personal romance and revolutionary-era tension.

== Production ==
Tasian is created and directed by Tina Pakravan and produced by Ali Asadzadeh. The series is set in 1977–78 (1356–57 Iranian calendar), in the years leading up to the Iranian Revolution. Pakravan’s production team is reported to include cinematographer Peyman Shadmanfar and composer Soroush Entezami, among others. The episode continues the narrative established in episode 1, focusing on Amir’s and Shirin’s relationship against a backdrop of social and political change.

=== Casting ===
The episode stars Hootan Shakiba as Amir Yousefinia and Mahsa Hejazi as Shirin Nejat. Other principal cast members include Babak Hamidian as Jamshid Nejat (Shirin’s father), and Saber Abar as Saeed (Amir’s friend and a SAVAK officer). The ensemble also features Nazanin Bayati as Maryam Saman, Pantea Panahiha as Homa, and Mehran Modiri as Dr. Rajabzadeh, among others. This ensemble is cited as contributing to the series’ emotional depth and technical quality.

=== Filming and Visual Effects ===
Filming details for individual episodes have not been published in Persian sources. The series’ visual design, however, has been noted in media reviews for its period accuracy and production values. No specific filming locations or VFX credits for episode 2 are given in available coverage.

== Release ==
"I Don't Love Her" was released for streaming in Iran on February 14, 2025, on Filimo. It followed the premiere episode "Ten Nights", which aired one week earlier. (No official Turkish or international release has been documented in Persian media.) The episode’s runtime is listed as 48 minutes on the Horadi film database.

== Reception ==
Persian media and audiences reacted strongly to the episode’s introduction of SAVAK elements. Reviews and social-media commentary noted that Episode 2’s portrayal of Amir’s recruitment into SAVAK and Shirin’s interrogation sparked controversy. Critics cited by Rooziato and Mihan Tejarat wrote that some viewers accused director Pakravan of “sanitizing” or “whitewashing” the image of SAVAK. These sources report that the series prompted heated debate online, with some users alleging an excessively sympathetic depiction of security forces. (Other reviewers argued that these scenes should be considered in the context of the overarching romantic narrative, rather than in isolation.) Overall, Episode 2 became a focal point for discussions about the show’s historical representation.
