= Khosrow and Shirin (Tasian) =

2025 episode of Tasian

- Tasian episode
- Episode no.: Season 1 Episode 4
- Directed by: Tina Pakravan
- Written by: Tina Pakravan
- Original release date: March 7, 2025
- Running time: 54 minutes

Episode chronology
← Previous "Lucky Ticket"	Next → "The Second Possibility"

"Khosrow and Shirin" is the fourth episode of the Iranian historical drama series Tasian. The episode was released on the Filimo streaming platform on March 7, 2025, after the series' release was temporarily suspended following the broadcast of its first three episodes. It was written and directed by Tina Pakravan and produced by Ali Asadzadeh. The episode continues the developing relationship between Amir Yousefinia (played by Hootan Shakiba) and Shirin Nejat (played by Mahsa Hejazi), as Amir, using the name Khosrow while working as a SAVAK officer, gets an opportunity to speak with Shirin alone. Concerns surrounding Shirin's possible arrest bring previously concealed information to the surface.

== Plot ==
Amir Yousefinia, now working within SAVAK under the name Khosrow, continues his attempts to get closer to Shirin Nejat. During a confrontation involving the arrest of students at the University of Tehran, Amir intervenes to help Shirin. He later encounters her in his capacity as a SAVAK officer, creating a conflict between his professional role and his feelings toward her. Shirin gradually realizes that Khosrow's interest in her is connected to the man she had previously encountered outside his official identity.

The episode also develops the relationship between Shirin and Amir through their shared interests and conversations. Their interactions reveal further details about their personalities and deepen the emotional tension between them. At the same time, the political storyline surrounding the students and SAVAK becomes increasingly connected to the central romance. The episode also introduces additional developments involving Dr. Rajabzadeh and the Nejat family, expanding the series' secondary storylines.

== Production ==
The episode was directed and written by Tina Pakravan. The series was produced by Ali Asadzadeh. Tasian is set in Tehran in the late 1970s, before the Iranian Revolution, and combines a romantic storyline with political and social events of the period. The fourth episode further develops the series' depiction of the relationship between its central characters while placing them against the political tensions surrounding SAVAK and student activity.

=== Casting ===
The episode stars Hootan Shakiba as Amir Yousefinia/Khosrow and Mahsa Hejazi as Shirin Nejat. The supporting cast includes Babak Hamidian as Jamshid Nejat, Saber Abar as Saeed, Pantea Panahiha as Homa, Nazanin Bayati as Maryam Saman, and Mehran Modiri as Dr. Rajabzadeh. Other cast members appearing in the series include Mohammad-Reza Sharifinia as Reza Yousefinia, Majid Mozaffari as the head of SAVAK, Mohammad Reza Ghaffari as Shahram Salar, Nasrin Nosrati as Ghodsi, Majid Yousefi as Omid Yousefinia, Reza Behboudi as Manouchehr Saman, Amir Hossein Seddigh as the head of the printing house, and Pantea Bahram as Homa's associate.

== Release ==
"Khosrow and Shirin" was originally scheduled to follow the third episode on February 28, 2025. However, the release of Tasian was suspended after three episodes amid regulatory and legal disputes concerning the series' production and distribution permits. SATRA had stated that the series had not received the required release authorization, while the judiciary subsequently ordered the suspension of its distribution. The production team and Filimo later made the requested modifications, allowing the fourth episode to be released.

The episode was ultimately released exclusively on Filimo on March 7, 2025, and has a runtime of approximately 56 minutes.

== Reception ==
The fourth episode received attention for bringing the romantic and political storylines closer together. Reviews highlighted Amir's development as Khosrow and his position as both a SAVAK officer and a man attempting to approach Shirin. One review specifically noted the tension created by Amir's presence in the interrogation room while Shirin is being questioned, as well as Hootan Shakiba's performance in portraying the character's conflicting emotions.

Another review praised the episode's period production design, particularly its recreation of 1970s Tehran and locations such as the University of Tehran and the printing house. The same review described Pakravan's direction as maintaining the series' pace while noting weaknesses in some dialogue and in the development of Shirin's character.
