= Farewell to the Gun (Tasian) =

2025 episode of Tasian

- Tasian episode
- Episode no.: Season 1 Episode 8
- Directed by: Tina Pakravan
- Written by: Tina Pakravan
- Original release date: April 4, 2025
- Running time: 55 minutes

Episode chronology
← Previous "Mother's Day"	Next → "Red Line"

"Farewell to the Gun" is the eighth episode of the Iranian historical drama series Tasian. It was written and directed by Tina Pakravan and produced by Ali Asadzadeh. The episode premiered on the Filimo streaming platform on April 4, 2025. In the episode, an unexpected event leaves the Nejat family confronting a situation for which they are entirely unprepared.

== Plot ==
Following the events of "Mother's Day", tensions surrounding the Nejat family continue to escalate. An unexpected incident disrupts the family's plans and places its members in circumstances they had not anticipated. As the consequences unfold, Amir Yousefinia and Shirin Nejat find themselves facing new personal and emotional challenges.

The episode continues the series' blend of romance and political drama, developing the impact of recent events on both the Nejat family and Amir while setting the stage for the conflicts explored in the following episode, "Red Line".

== Production ==
The episode was written and directed by Tina Pakravan and produced by Ali Asadzadeh. Like the rest of the series, it was filmed as part of Tasian, a historical romance set in Tehran during the final years of the Pahlavi dynasty before the Iranian Revolution.

=== Casting ===
The principal cast includes Hootan Shakiba as Amir Yousefinia, Mahsa Hejazi as Shirin Nejat, Babak Hamidian as Jamshid Nejat, Saber Abar as Saeed, Nazanin Bayati as Maryam Saman, Pantea Panahiha as Homa Nejat, Reyhaneh Razi as Houri Malekshahi, Reza Behboudi as Manouchehr Saman, and Mehran Modiri as Dr. Rajabzadeh.

== Release ==
"Farewell to the Gun" premiered on Filimo on April 4, 2025, as the eighth episode of the first season of Tasian. The episode has a runtime of 55 minutes and continued the series' weekly Friday release schedule.

== Reception ==
At the time of access, the episode held a user rating of 7.5/10 on IMDb, making it one of the highest-rated episodes of the first season according to user votes. Reviewers highlighted the episode's visual style and restrained use of dialogue, noting that its cinematography and performances conveyed much of the emotional tension through atmosphere rather than exposition.
