= Tasian (TV series) =

2025 Iranian television series

- persian: تاسیان
- Genre: Historical; Drama; Romance
- Created by: Tina Pakravan
- Written by: Tina Pakravan
- Directed by: Tina Pakravan
- Starring: Mahsa Hejazi; Hootan Shakiba; Babak Hamidian; Nazanin Bayati; Pantea Panahiha; Saber Abar; Majid Yousefi; Reza Behboudi; Mehran Modiri
- Composer: Soroush Entezami
- No. of seasons: 1
- No. of episodes: 23

Production
- Producer: Ali Asadzadeh
- Cinematography: Peyman Shadmanfar
- Editor: Mohammad Najjarian
- Running time: 40–60 minutes

Original release
- Network: Filimo
- Release: 7 February – 25 July 2025

Tāsīān (Persian: تاسیان) is an Iranian television series written and directed by Tina Pakravan, which aired for one season on Filimo from 7 February 2025, to 24 July of that year. Critics praised its set and costume design and deemed its historical accuracy low.

== Story ==
Set in 1977 to 1978, mainly in Tehran, the series follows Amir, a young poor printing-house worker, who falls for Shirin—a wealthy customer—at first sight, and becomes determined to marry her at any cost. This love creates many challenges for the two.

== Cast and crew ==
- Houtan Shakiba as Amir Yousefinia, who at first introduces himself to Shirin as Khosrow, a SAVAK agent.
- Babak Hamidian as Jamshid Nejat, father of Shirin and a factory owner; he is in love with Houri.
- Mahsa Hejazi as Shirin Nejat, an illustrator of children's storybooks.
- Saber Abar as Sa'eed, friend of Amir who works at SAVAK.
- Pantea Panahiha as Homa Nejat, sister of Jamshid and wife of Manouchehr.
- Nazanin Bayati as Maryam Saman, cousin of Shirin, daughter of Homa and Manouchehr.
- Mehran Modiri as Dr. Rajabzadeh, a Persian literature professor and head of a leftist student group at Tehran University, who wants to have a relationship with Houri.
- Mohammad-Reza Sharifinia as Reza Yousefinia, father of Amir.
- Majid Mozaffari as The Boss, a high-level SAVAK general.
- Shahram Qa'edi as Mohsen, a rebellious worker at Jamshid's factory, who has a relationship with Pari.
- Atefeh Razavi as Shokouh, wife of Timsar Salar.
- Mohammad-Reza Ghaffari as Shahram Salar, son of Shokouh and Timsar Salar, who also wants to marry Shirin.
- Majid Yousefi as Omid Yousefinia, brother of Amir.
- Reza Behboudi as Manouchehr Saman, husband of Homa and father of Maryam and Arash, who runs the company with Jamshid.
- Nasrin Nosrati as Qodsi, mother of Amir.
- Reyhaneh Razi as Houri, a fashion designer who is in love with Jamshid.
- Amir-Hosein Seddigh as the head of the printing house where Amir first works.
- Pouria Shakiba'i as Nader, classmate of Shirin and Maryam at university, who wants to marry Maryam.
- Afshin Hasanlou as Babak, classmate of Shirin at university, who initially likes her.
- Mehrdad Niknam as Timsar Salar, a high-level army general and father of Shahram.
- Mohammad Shiri as Ja'far, one of the two workers at Jamshid's family house, husband of Nazy.
- Ma'edeh Tahmasbi as Nazy, wife of Ja'far, also working at Jamshid's house.
- Banafsheh Riyazi as Sepideh, cousin of Amir, who loves him.
- Deniz Danesh-Samadi as Pari Ashtiani, executive assistant at Jamshid's office, who has a relationship with Mohsen.

=== Main crew ===
Crew member	Title	Source
Ali Asadzadeh	Producer	
Tina Pakravan	Director / Writer	
Iraj Raminfar	Set Designer	
Elham Mo'in	Costume Designer	
Soroush Entezami	Composer	
Mohammad Najjarian	Editor	
Babak Eskandari	Makeup Designer	
Peyman Shadmanfar	Director of Photography	
Farid Nazer-Fasihi	VFX Designer	
Alireza Alavian	Sound Designer	

== Production and release ==
The title of the series, Tāsīān (تاسیان), has roots in both the Gorani Kurdish and Gilaki languages, generally referring to a state of deep grief, restlessness, or longing. While the writer and director, Tina Pakravan, specifically drew the title from Gilaki, defining it as 'the profound sorrow and grief one experiences at dusk on the day of losing a loved one'. The series' main actor, Hootan Shakiba, noted that the title shares a common linguistic root with the Kurdish term Tase:

After a few months of the series airing, I noticed the word is used much more among ourselves (in Kurdistan), like "tase" (Kurdish: تاسە), which means sadness or heartache. In fact, both words "tase" and "tasian" share the same linguistic root and are essentially one and the same. This word is frequently used in the city of Sanandaj.

— Hootan Shakiba,

This series, whose production process spanned approximately two years, constitutes the second installment of the Once Upon a Time in Iran trilogy, with Khātūn (Persian: خاتون, lit. 'Noblewoman') serving as its first part and the forthcoming series Māhdōkht (Persian: ماهدخت, lit. 'Moon Daughter') as its third.

=== Music ===
Pakravan's initial idea for the series music was that it would start with "buoyant" music and reach "despair" at the end. Entezami, the composer of the work, changed the musical atmosphere of the series in accordance with the changes in the series' theme. For example, from the eighth episode, when the series' tone becomes more serious, cello sounds are also used.

=== Release and controversies ===
Tāsīān, which aired Fridays from 7 February 2025, to 24 July 2025, was considered one of the most-watched television series in Iran. It was the breakout vehicle for actresses Reyhaneh Razi and Mahsa Hejazi. Following the broadcast of the series' third episode, SATRA halted its broadcast. The stated reasons for the suspension were deficiencies in the series and its lack of production and broadcast license. This news prompted a response from some of the production team members. In an interview, Pakravan stated that she and her husband, Ali Asadzadeh, the series' producer, had negotiated with SATRA for about 17 months to secure permission to air the series. Ultimately, after about a week of back-and-forth, the fourth episode of Tāsīān aired with a one-week delay.

Elham Mo'in, who was responsible for the series' costume design, was convicted by the Judiciary of the Islamic Republic of Iran and sentenced to 91 days of Ta'zir imprisonment—a sentence later converted to a fine of 50 million Iranian rials. The conviction was based on what was described as "producing and disseminating obscene content through the reposting of images of the series' characters on Mo'in's personal Instagram account." Headquarters for Enjoining the Good and Forbidding the Evil in Iran also filed a complaint against the managers of SATRA and the managers of the Filimo platform, on which the series was aired, citing what it described as the presence of mixed-gender dancing, kissing, and embracing among the characters, as well as a lack of required Islamic dress.

== Episodes ==
No.	Title	Original release date
1	"Ten Nights"	February 7, 2025
When Shirin enters the printing house, Amir realizes that the paintings he loved are images of the painter himself. His dream begins to come to life.
2	"I Don't Love Her"	February 14, 2025
Thinking Shirin is the girl of his dreams, Amir becomes determined to do something unusual to get closer to her.
3	"Lucky Ticket"	February 21, 2025
Amir has entered SAVAK because of Shirin, but when he approaches her, he realizes that Wednesday is the day of her proposal.
4	"Khosrow and Shirin"	February 28, 2025
Finally, Amir gets to speak with Shirin alone, but concerns about her possible arrest reveal unspoken secrets.
5	"The Second Possibility"	March 14, 2025
Shirin and Amir cannot find each other after the interrogation. Meanwhile, Shahram formally proposes to Shirin.
6	"Marsh"	March 20, 2025
Jamshid, whose daughter's engagement has been ruined, forbids her from leaving the house, while Amir searches for a way to meet her.
7	"Mother's Day"	March 28, 2025
Frustrated by the printing shop owner who betrayed him and by Jamshid Nejat, who has imprisoned his daughter, Amir sets out to find a way forward.
8	"Farewell to the Gun"	April 4, 2025
An unexpected turn of events leaves the Nejat family facing a situation for which they are completely unprepared.
9	"Red Line"	April 11, 2025
Following Manouchehr's sudden death and the shock it brings to the Nejat family, Amir tries to arrange at least the minimum conditions for Manouchehr's burial.
10	"Destiny"	April 18, 2025
Fate brings Amir and Omid face to face just as Amir wants to be by Shirin's side.
11	"Little Black Fish"	April 25, 2025
With Nejat gone, Amir and Shahram try to support Shirin in running the factory while both hope to win her love.
12	"Chaharshanbeh Suri"	May 2, 2025
On Chaharshanbeh Suri, while the Nejat family leaps over the flames in celebration, Jamshid Nejat finds himself caught in Khosrow's fire.
13	"New Year"	May 9, 2025
Shirin tells Amir about her upcoming trip, and unable to bear the thought of her leaving, Amir makes a decision.
14	"Injured Face"	May 16, 2025
Jamshid's accident throws Amir's and Shirin's families into a new challenge.
15	"A Three-Person Date"	May 23, 2025
Shirin is torn between her heart and her reason, while Amir searches for a way to prove himself.
16	"For the Last Time"	May 30, 2025
Shirin discovers her father's secret relationship with Houri, throwing her family's life into turmoil.
17	"Rivers"	June 6, 2025
Amir and Shirin head to Behesht-e Mououd, while their families remain in Tehran, unaware and anxiously waiting.
18	"Line of Destiny"	June 14, 2025
Amir's and Shirin's absence not only deepens the turmoil between their families but also forces others to face the truth. Sepideh and Shahram are drawn further into the conflict.
19	"Nosho Nosho"	June 27, 2025
A wiretap on Amir's family home reveals their whereabouts. Meanwhile, after a period of exile, Saeed returns.
20	"Sweet Vulnerability"	July 4, 2025
Shirin turns to Houri for help in winning Jamshid's affection.
21	"Purge"	July 11, 2025
To regain his former position, Saeed has no choice but to arrest Rajabzadeh. But Rajabzadeh knows how to play the political game.
22	"Goodbye, Friend"	July 18, 2025
Jamshid and Homa are determined to take the children out of Iran, but Shirin refuses to leave.
23	"Flight of the Swans"	July 25, 2025
Everything turned out the way it shouldn’t have… and it became Tasian.

== Reception ==
=== Critical response ===
Critics praised Tāsīān for its set and costume design, and described the work as audience-friendly and engaging. At the same time, they considered Shakiba's acting poor, deemed the main love story between Amir and Shirin superficial, and found the screenplay full of flaws. Critics also found the series' historical accuracy insufficient, described Amir's characterization as weak, and stated that the story suffers a sudden decline from a certain point onward.

=== Accolades ===
Tāsīān was nominated at Hafez Awards in 11 categories, three of which it won.
