= A Three-Person Date (Tasian) =

2025 episode of Tasian

- Tasian episode
- Episode no.: Season 1 Episode 15
- Directed by: Tina Pakravan
- Written by: Tina Pakravan
- Original release date: May 23, 2025
- Running time: 52 minutes

Episode chronology
← Previous "Injured Face"	Next → "For the Last Time"

"A Three-Person Date" is the fifteenth episode of the Iranian historical drama series Tasian. Written and directed by Tina Pakravan and produced by Ali Asadzadeh, the episode premiered on the Filimo streaming platform on May 23, 2025. The story follows Shirin Nejat as she struggles to reconcile her emotions with her sense of responsibility, while Amir Yousefinia searches for a way to prove himself worthy of her trust and affection.

== Plot ==
Following the events surrounding Jamshid Nejat's accident, the emotional distance between the principal characters becomes increasingly difficult to ignore. Shirin finds herself caught between what she believes she should do and what she truly desires, forcing her to question decisions that have shaped her relationship with Amir. As expectations from her family continue to weigh on her, she becomes increasingly uncertain about the future.

Meanwhile, Amir refuses to abandon his pursuit of Shirin despite the obstacles standing between them. Determined to demonstrate his sincerity, he searches for an opportunity to prove himself through his actions rather than his words. His efforts bring him into situations that further complicate his relationships with those around him, particularly as rival interests continue to shape the choices facing both families.

The episode uses the meeting suggested by its title as a dramatic turning point, bringing together competing emotions and conflicting intentions. By its conclusion, the decisions made by Amir and Shirin deepen the personal and familial tensions that drive the remainder of the season.

== Production ==
The episode was written and directed by Tina Pakravan and produced by Ali Asadzadeh. It forms part of the first season of Tasian, a historical romantic drama set during the final years of the Pahlavi dynasty, with its narrative blending personal relationships and the political atmosphere of late-1970s Iran.

== Release ==
"A Three-Person Date" premiered on Filimo on May 23, 2025, as the fifteenth episode of the first season of Tasian. The episode continued the series' weekly Friday release schedule and was released with the official Persian title قرار سه‌نفره.
