= New Year (Tasian) =

2025 episode of Tasian

- Tasian episode
- Episode no.: Season 1 Episode 13
- Directed by: Tina Pakravan
- Written by: Tina Pakravan
- Original release date: May 9, 2025
- Running time: 48 minutes

Episode chronology
← Previous "Chaharshanbeh Suri"	Next → "Injured Face"

"New Year" is the thirteenth episode of the Iranian historical drama series Tasian. Written and directed by Tina Pakravan and produced by Ali Asadzadeh, the episode premiered on the Filimo streaming platform on May 9, 2025. It follows Amir Yousefinia after Shirin Nejat reveals that she is preparing to leave on a trip, prompting him to make a life-changing decision in an effort to prevent their separation.

== Plot ==
Following the events of "Chaharshanbeh Suri", Shirin tells Amir that she will soon be leaving Tehran. Unable to accept the prospect of losing her, Amir becomes determined to prevent their separation, believing that time is running out for their relationship. As the New Year begins, both characters are forced to confront the consequences of the choices they have made in recent weeks.

Meanwhile, the Nejat family continues to deal with the aftermath of earlier conflicts. Shirin finds herself torn between her family's expectations and her growing feelings for Amir, while the pressures surrounding the family's affairs leave her with little freedom to decide her own future. The uncertainty surrounding her planned departure further intensifies the emotional strain on those closest to her.

Realizing that conventional solutions are no longer sufficient, Amir makes a decisive choice that could permanently alter both his own future and Shirin's. The episode concludes by setting in motion a new phase of the narrative, as personal desires increasingly collide with family obligations and the political realities surrounding the characters.

== Production ==
The episode was written and directed by Tina Pakravan and produced by Ali Asadzadeh. It forms part of the first season of Tasian, a historical romance set in Tehran during the closing years of the Pahlavi dynasty, combining a personal love story with the political and social atmosphere preceding the Iranian Revolution.

== Release ==
"New Year" premiered on Filimo on May 9, 2025, as the thirteenth episode of the first season of Tasian. According to TheTVDB, the episode has a runtime of 48 minutes and continued the series' weekly Friday release schedule.
