= Chaharshanbeh Suri (Tasian) =

2025 episode of Tasian

- Tasian episode
- Episode no.: Season 1 Episode 12
- Directed by: Tina Pakravan
- Written by: Tina Pakravan
- Original release date: May 2, 2025
- Running time: 47 minutes

Episode chronology
← Previous "Little Black Fish"	Next → "New Year"

"Chaharshanbeh Suri" is the twelfth episode of the Iranian historical drama series Tasian. Written and directed by Tina Pakravan and produced by Ali Asadzadeh, it premiered on the Filimo streaming platform on May 2, 2025. Set during the traditional Iranian festival of Chaharshanbe Suri, the episode juxtaposes public celebration with escalating tensions within the Nejat family, culminating in a turning point for Jamshid Nejat.

== Plot ==
The events of the episode take place during the annual Chaharshanbeh Suri celebrations. While the Nejat family attempts to observe the holiday and preserve a sense of normalcy, unresolved conflicts continue to shape the relationships between its members. Shirin remains caught between family expectations and her growing emotional attachment to Amir, while those around her struggle with the consequences of earlier events.

As the festivities unfold, Jamshid Nejat faces a personal crisis that alters the balance within the family. The contrast between the public celebration and the private turmoil underscores the episode's themes of tradition, guilt, and irreversible change, setting the stage for the events of the following episode, "New Year".

== Production ==
The episode was written and directed by Tina Pakravan and produced by Ali Asadzadeh. Like the rest of the series, it forms part of Tasian, a historical romantic drama set in Tehran during the final years of the Pahlavi dynasty before the Iranian Revolution. The episode incorporates the traditions of Chaharshanbeh Suri into its narrative, using the festival as a dramatic backdrop for the principal characters' conflicts.

== Release ==
"Chaharshanbeh Suri" premiered on Filimo on May 2, 2025, as the twelfth episode of the first season of Tasian. The episode has a runtime of 47 minutes and continued the series' weekly Friday release schedule.
