= Injured Face (Tasian) =

2025 episode of Tasian

- Tasian episode
- Episode no.: Season 1 Episode 14
- Directed by: Tina Pakravan
- Written by: Tina Pakravan
- Original release date: May 16, 2025
- Running time: 49 minutes

Episode chronology
← Previous "New Year"	Next → "A Three-Person Date"

"Injured Face" is the fourteenth episode of the Iranian historical drama series Tasian. Written and directed by Tina Pakravan and produced by Ali Asadzadeh, the episode premiered on the Filimo streaming platform on May 16, 2025. It centers on the aftermath of Jamshid Nejat's accident, an event that forces both Amir Yousefinia's family and the Nejat family to confront an unexpected crisis while further complicating Amir and Shirin's relationship.

== Plot ==
Following Amir's decision in the previous episode, the lives of both the Nejat and Yousefinia families are disrupted when Jamshid Nejat is seriously injured in an accident. As concern over his condition spreads, family members are drawn into a new crisis that reshapes existing relationships and priorities.

While Jamshid's recovery becomes the family's immediate concern, Amir and Shirin struggle to maintain contact amid the uncertainty created by the accident. Their personal feelings are increasingly overshadowed by family obligations, leaving both of them uncertain about the future of their relationship. The emotional consequences of the incident also affect those closest to the Nejat family, deepening existing tensions and creating new divisions.

As the episode progresses, the accident proves to be more than an isolated event, becoming a catalyst for further conflict between the two families. The developments lay the groundwork for the choices and confrontations that follow in "A Three-Person Date".

== Production ==
The episode was written and directed by Tina Pakravan and produced by Ali Asadzadeh. As with the rest of the series, it was filmed as part of Tasian, a historical romance set in Tehran during the late 1970s, with the personal lives of its characters unfolding against the social and political climate preceding the Iranian Revolution.

== Release ==
"Injured Face" premiered on Filimo on May 16, 2025, as the fourteenth episode of the first season of Tasian. According to official episode listings, it was released as part of the series' weekly Friday schedule and has a runtime of approximately 49 minutes.
