= Nosho Nosho (Tasian) =

2025 episode of Tasian

- Tasian episode
- Episode no.: Season 1 Episode 19
- Directed by: Tina Pakravan
- Written by: Tina Pakravan
- Original release date: June 27, 2025
- Running time: 46 minutes

Episode chronology
← Previous "Line of Destiny"	Next → "Sweet Vulnerability"

"Nosho Nosho" is the nineteenth episode of the Iranian historical drama series Tasian. Written and directed by Tina Pakravan and produced by Ali Asadzadeh, the episode premiered on the Filimo streaming platform on June 27, 2025. The episode follows the authorities' efforts to locate Amir Yousefinia and Shirin Nejat after a wiretap reveals their whereabouts, while Saeed returns after a period of exile and becomes involved in the unfolding events.

== Plot ==
As Amir and Shirin remain away from Tehran, a wiretap placed on the Yousefinia family home provides investigators with information about their location. The discovery intensifies the search for the couple, placing additional pressure on both families as they attempt to anticipate the authorities' next move.

Meanwhile, Saeed returns after a period of exile, re-entering a political and personal landscape that has changed significantly during his absence. His return alters existing alliances and introduces new tensions among the characters, as several individuals attempt to protect their own interests while responding to rapidly changing circumstances.

The episode expands the political dimension of the series by linking the search for Amir and Shirin with broader security operations. These developments leave both families facing increasing uncertainty and establish the circumstances that lead directly into the events of "Sweet Vulnerability".

== Production ==
The episode was written and directed by Tina Pakravan and produced by Ali Asadzadeh. Continuing the series' combination of historical drama and romance, the episode places greater emphasis on surveillance, political maneuvering, and the consequences of the protagonists' decisions while maintaining the late-1970s setting of the series.

== Release ==
"Nosho Nosho" premiered on Filimo on June 27, 2025, as the nineteenth episode of the first season of Tasian. It was released as part of the series' weekly Friday schedule and was followed by "Sweet Vulnerability" on July 4, 2025.
