= Little Black Fish (Tasian) =

2025 episode of Tasian

- Tasian episode
- Episode no.: Season 1 Episode 11
- Directed by: Tina Pakravan
- Written by: Tina Pakravan
- Original release date: April 25, 2025
- Running time: 54 minutes

Episode chronology
← Previous "Destiny"	Next → "Chaharshanbeh Suri"

"Little Black Fish" is the eleventh episode of the Iranian historical drama series Tasian. Written and directed by Tina Pakravan, the episode premiered on the Filimo streaming platform on April 25, 2025. It focuses on the aftermath of Jamshid Nejat's absence from the family's business, as Shirin assumes greater responsibility at the Nejat factory while Amir Yousefinia and Shahram each attempt to support her, driven by both personal loyalty and romantic interest.

== Plot ==
Following recent events surrounding the Nejat family, Shirin becomes increasingly involved in managing the family factory. Faced with new responsibilities, she attempts to preserve stability within the business while also coping with the emotional consequences of the family's ongoing crisis.

Amir Yousefinia and Shahram each offer to help Shirin run the factory. Although both appear committed to supporting her during a difficult period, their efforts are also shaped by their affection for Shirin, intensifying the rivalry between them. As their competition becomes more apparent, Shirin finds herself caught between personal relationships and the practical demands of managing the family business.

The episode continues to develop the central love triangle while exploring themes of responsibility, loyalty, and trust, setting the stage for the events of "Chaharshanbeh Suri".

== Production ==
The episode was written and directed by Tina Pakravan and produced by Ali Asadzadeh. It forms part of the first season of Tasian, a historical romantic drama set in Tehran during the final years of the Pahlavi dynasty.

== Release ==
"Little Black Fish" premiered on Filimo on April 25, 2025, as the eleventh episode of the first season. It has a runtime of 54 minutes and continued the series' weekly Friday release schedule.
