= Goodbye, Friend (Tasian) =

2025 episode of Tasian

- Tasian episode
- Episode no.: Season 1 Episode 22
- Directed by: Tina Pakravan
- Written by: Tina Pakravan
- Original release date: July 18, 2025
- Running time: 49 minutes

Episode chronology
← Previous "Purge"	Next → "Flight of the Swans"

"Goodbye, Friend" is the twenty-second episode of the Iranian historical drama series Tasian. Written and directed by Tina Pakravan and produced by Ali Asadzadeh, the episode premiered on the Filimo streaming platform on July 18, 2025. As political instability intensifies, Jamshid and Homa resolve to leave Iran with their family, but Shirin refuses to accompany them, creating a decisive conflict within the Nejat household.

== Plot ==
Amid the worsening political situation, Jamshid and Homa conclude that leaving Iran is the only way to ensure their family's safety. They begin making preparations to take the children out of the country, believing that emigration offers the best chance of avoiding the uncertainty surrounding them. Their decision, however, is met with unexpected resistance from Shirin, who refuses to abandon her own convictions and remains determined to stay behind.

Shirin's refusal deepens the divisions within the family and forces those closest to her to confront conflicting loyalties between personal relationships and family obligations. Meanwhile, Amir faces the consequences of Shirin's decision as the possibility of separation becomes increasingly real. The episode examines the emotional cost of choosing between love, family, and an uncertain future during a period of national upheaval.

The episode concludes with the future of the Nejat family remaining uncertain, while the consequences of Shirin's choice establish the narrative leading into the season finale, "Flight of the Swans".

== Production ==
The episode was written and directed by Tina Pakravan and produced by Ali Asadzadeh. Continuing the series' historical setting during the final years of the Pahlavi era, the episode emphasizes the intersection of political upheaval and personal relationships, illustrating how national events shape the decisions of individual characters.

== Release ==
"Goodbye, Friend" premiered on Filimo on July 18, 2025, as the twenty-second episode of the first season of Tasian. Released as part of the series' weekly Friday schedule, it serves as the penultimate episode of the season and precedes the finale, "Flight of the Swans".
