= Flight of the Swans (Tasian) =

2025 episode of Tasian

- Tasian episode
- Episode no.: Season 1 Episode 23
- Directed by: Tina Pakravan
- Written by: Tina Pakravan
- Original release date: July 25, 2025
- Running time: 46 minutes

Episode chronology
← Previous "Goodbye, Friend"	Next → —

"Flight of the Swans" is the twenty-third and final episode of the Iranian historical drama series Tasian. Written and directed by Tina Pakravan and produced by Ali Asadzadeh, the episode premiered on the Filimo streaming platform on July 25, 2025. Serving as the season and series finale, it concludes the intertwined stories of Amir Yousefinia, Shirin Nejat, and their families against the backdrop of the final months preceding the Iranian Revolution.

== Plot ==
Following Shirin's refusal to leave Iran with her family, the events set in motion throughout the season reach their conclusion. The relationships that have shaped the series are tested one final time as the principal characters confront the consequences of their choices. Long-standing conflicts within the Nejat family, together with the political pressures surrounding Amir and those close to him, culminate in a series of irreversible decisions.

As the narrative approaches its conclusion, several characters face outcomes that reflect the emotional and political themes explored throughout the series. Jamshid Nejat's storyline reaches its resolution, while Amir and Shirin are forced to confront the reality that love alone cannot overcome the turbulent historical circumstances surrounding them. The episode emphasizes loss, separation, and the collapse of the world the characters had hoped to preserve, bringing the central romance to a bittersweet conclusion.

The final scenes close the story on an elegiac note, illustrating how personal destinies are ultimately shaped by larger historical events. The episode gives the title Tasian—a Persian word referring to profound grief and longing—its fullest thematic expression, concluding the series with an emphasis on memory, separation, and irreversible change.

== Production ==
The episode was written and directed by Tina Pakravan and produced by Ali Asadzadeh. As the conclusion of the series, it brings together the romantic, familial, and political storylines established throughout the season while maintaining the historical setting of late Pahlavi-era Iran. The finale was promoted by Filimo as the culmination of the series' central narrative.

== Release ==
"Flight of the Swans" premiered on Filimo on July 25, 2025, as the twenty-third and final episode of the first season of Tasian. The finale concluded the series' weekly Friday release schedule, which had begun on February 7, 2025. Prior to its release, Persian media highlighted audience anticipation surrounding the ending and the fate of the principal characters.

== Reception ==
The series finale generated significant discussion among Persian-language media and viewers. Commentary focused particularly on the resolution of Jamshid Nejat's storyline and the tragic ending of the central romance. Several reviewers described the conclusion as emotionally devastating while noting that it remained consistent with the melancholic tone established throughout the series. Critics also observed that the finale reinforced the drama's recurring themes of love, separation, and the impact of political upheaval on individual lives.
