= For the Last Time (Tasian) =

2025 episode of Tasian

- Tasian episode
- Episode no.: Season 1 Episode 16
- Directed by: Tina Pakravan
- Written by: Tina Pakravan
- Original release date: May 30, 2025
- Running time: 46 minutes

Episode chronology
← Previous "A Three-Person Date"	Next → "Rivers"

"For the Last Time" is the sixteenth episode of the Iranian historical drama series Tasian. Written and directed by Tina Pakravan and produced by Ali Asadzadeh, the episode premiered on the Filimo streaming platform on May 30, 2025. The story centers on Shirin Nejat's discovery of her father Jamshid's long-hidden relationship with Houri, a revelation that destabilizes the Nejat family and reshapes the relationships among its members.

== Plot ==
After weeks of growing tension within the Nejat household, Shirin uncovers evidence of her father Jamshid's secret relationship with Houri. The revelation shatters her perception of her family and creates a deep rift between Jamshid and those closest to him. As long-suppressed truths come to light, members of the family are forced to confront the consequences of decisions that have remained hidden for years.

The disclosure also places Shirin in an increasingly difficult emotional position. Already struggling to reconcile her feelings for Amir with her obligations toward her family, she must now cope with the collapse of the trust she once placed in her father. Meanwhile, Amir attempts to remain at Shirin's side as the family crisis intensifies, although the circumstances leave him with little ability to influence events directly.

As the episode progresses, the consequences of Jamshid's secret extend beyond his immediate family, altering the balance of several relationships established earlier in the season. By the conclusion, the Nejat family's internal conflict has reached a new level, paving the way for the events of "Rivers".

== Production ==
The episode was written and directed by Tina Pakravan and produced by Ali Asadzadeh. Continuing the series' blend of romance and historical drama, the episode explores themes of family loyalty, betrayal, and the long-term consequences of hidden relationships against the backdrop of late-1970s Tehran.

== Release ==
"For the Last Time" premiered on Filimo on May 30, 2025, as the sixteenth episode of the first season of Tasian. It continued the series' weekly Friday release schedule and was released under its Persian title برای آخرین بار. According to official episode listings, the runtime is approximately 46 minutes.
