= Purge (Tasian) =

2025 episode of Tasian

- Tasian episode
- Episode no.: Season 1 Episode 21
- Directed by: Tina Pakravan
- Written by: Tina Pakravan
- Original release date: July 11, 2025
- Running time: 49 minutes

Episode chronology
← Previous "Sweet Vulnerability"	Next → "Goodbye, Friend"

"Purge" is the twenty-first episode of the Iranian historical drama series Tasian. Written and directed by Tina Pakravan and produced by Ali Asadzadeh, the episode premiered on the Filimo streaming platform on July 11, 2025. The episode shifts its focus toward the political conflict surrounding Saeed, who seeks to regain his former position by arresting Dr. Rajabzadeh, while Rajabzadeh attempts to outmaneuver him through political influence.

== Plot ==
As political tensions continue to escalate, Saeed is presented with an opportunity to restore his standing, but only by carrying out the arrest of Dr. Rajabzadeh. The assignment places him in direct conflict with a figure who possesses considerable political experience and understands how to navigate the changing balance of power. Rather than submitting quietly, Rajabzadeh begins using his connections and influence to resist the growing pressure against him.

While the struggle between Saeed and Rajabzadeh unfolds, the wider network of relationships established throughout the series is affected by the shifting political climate. Personal loyalties increasingly intersect with institutional power, forcing several characters to reconsider their alliances and the consequences of their previous decisions. The episode further demonstrates how political developments have become inseparable from the personal lives of the protagonists.

By the end of the episode, the confrontation between Saeed and Rajabzadeh has altered the political landscape surrounding the principal characters, setting in motion the events that continue in "Goodbye, Friend".

== Production ==
The episode was written and directed by Tina Pakravan and produced by Ali Asadzadeh. While maintaining the series' romantic storyline, the episode places greater emphasis on political intrigue, depicting the rivalry between state officials and the influence of personal ambition within the governmental structure of late Pahlavi-era Iran.

== Release ==
"Purge" premiered on Filimo on July 11, 2025, as the twenty-first episode of the first season of Tasian. It was released according to the series' weekly Friday schedule and was followed by "Goodbye, Friend", released on July 18, 2025.
