= Rivers (Tasian) =

2025 episode of Tasian

- Tasian episode
- Episode no.: Season 1 Episode 17
- Directed by: Tina Pakravan
- Written by: Tina Pakravan
- Original release date: June 6, 2025
- Running time: 48 minutes

Episode chronology
← Previous "For the Last Time"	Next → "Line of Destiny"

"Rivers" is the seventeenth episode of the Iranian historical drama series Tasian. Written and directed by Tina Pakravan and produced by Ali Asadzadeh, the episode premiered on the Filimo streaming platform on June 6, 2025. It follows Amir Yousefinia and Shirin Nejat as they travel to Behesht-e Mououd, while their families remain in Tehran, unaware of their whereabouts and increasingly anxious about their disappearance.

== Plot ==
In the aftermath of the revelations that shook the Nejat family, Amir and Shirin leave Tehran together and travel to Behesht-e Mououd, hoping to distance themselves from the pressures surrounding their lives. Their unexpected absence leaves both families without any knowledge of where they have gone, creating growing concern among relatives and friends.

Away from Tehran, Amir and Shirin are given a rare opportunity to spend time together without the immediate influence of their families. Their journey allows them to reflect on the choices that have brought them to this point, while confronting the uncertainty surrounding their future. Meanwhile, those left behind struggle to determine what has happened, and the lack of communication intensifies the emotional strain within both households.

As concern over the couple's disappearance grows, the episode shifts its focus between the quiet moments shared by Amir and Shirin and the escalating anxiety experienced by their families. The events establish the circumstances that lead directly into the conflicts explored in the following episode, "Line of Destiny".

== Production ==
The episode was written and directed by Tina Pakravan and produced by Ali Asadzadeh. Continuing the series' historical setting in late-1970s Iran, the episode temporarily shifts the narrative away from Tehran, emphasizing the emotional development of its central characters while maintaining the broader social and political backdrop established throughout the season.

== Release ==
"Rivers" premiered on Filimo on June 6, 2025, as the seventeenth episode of the first season of Tasian. The episode continued the series' weekly Friday release schedule and has a runtime of approximately 48 minutes according to official listings.
