= Sweet Vulnerability (Tasian) =

2025 episode of Tasian

- Tasian episode
- Episode no.: Season 1 Episode 20
- Directed by: Tina Pakravan
- Written by: Tina Pakravan
- Original release date: July 4, 2025
- Running time: 47 minutes

Episode chronology
← Previous "Nosho Nosho"	Next → "Purge"

"Sweet Vulnerability" is the twentieth episode of the Iranian historical drama series Tasian. Written and directed by Tina Pakravan and produced by Ali Asadzadeh, the episode premiered on the Filimo streaming platform on July 4, 2025. In the episode, Shirin Nejat turns to Houri for help in repairing her strained relationship with her father, Jamshid Nejat, while tensions within the family continue to escalate.

== Plot ==
Following the events of the previous episode, Shirin seeks Houri's assistance in the hope of rebuilding her relationship with Jamshid. Believing that Houri may be able to influence her father, she turns to the one person whose connection with Jamshid has become central to the family's recent conflicts. Their interactions reveal the emotional consequences of past decisions while exposing the fragile state of the Nejat household.

Meanwhile, Amir continues to navigate the increasingly complex circumstances surrounding Shirin and her family. As personal loyalties and longstanding resentments intersect, the characters are forced to reconsider their relationships and the sacrifices they are willing to make. The episode emphasizes the emotional vulnerability of its principal characters, particularly as they struggle to reconcile affection with obligation.

As Shirin's efforts to heal the divisions within her family encounter new obstacles, the episode further develops the interpersonal conflicts that define the latter part of the season and sets the stage for the political developments of "Purge".

== Production ==
The episode was written and directed by Tina Pakravan and produced by Ali Asadzadeh. Like the rest of the series, it combines romantic melodrama with the social and political atmosphere of Iran during the final years of the Pahlavi era, placing particular emphasis on family relationships and emotional conflict.

== Release ==
"Sweet Vulnerability" premiered on Filimo on July 4, 2025, as the twentieth episode of the first season of Tasian. The episode continued the series' weekly Friday release schedule and preceded the twenty-first episode, "Purge", released on July 11, 2025.
