= Line of Destiny (Tasian) =

2025 episode of Tasian

- Tasian episode
- Episode no.: Season 1 Episode 18
- Directed by: Tina Pakravan
- Written by: Tina Pakravan
- Original release date: June 13, 2025
- Running time: 46 minutes

Episode chronology
← Previous "Rivers"	Next → "Nosho Nosho"

"Line of Destiny" is the eighteenth episode of the Iranian historical drama series Tasian. Written and directed by Tina Pakravan and produced by Ali Asadzadeh, the episode premiered on the Filimo streaming platform on June 13, 2025. Continuing directly from the events of "Rivers", the episode follows the consequences of Amir Yousefinia and Shirin Nejat's disappearance, as their absence intensifies the conflict between their families and forces several characters to confront long-avoided truths.

== Plot ==
Following Amir and Shirin's departure from Tehran, their continued absence becomes a source of growing anxiety for both the Nejat and Yousefinia families. As relatives and acquaintances search for information about their whereabouts, uncertainty gives rise to suspicion, exposing divisions that had previously remained beneath the surface.

While Amir and Shirin attempt to determine their next course of action, the crisis increasingly affects those they left behind. The circumstances surrounding their disappearance compel several characters to face difficult realities about their relationships and loyalties. At the same time, Sepideh and Shahram become more deeply involved in the unfolding conflict, with their decisions influencing the direction of events.

As hidden motivations are brought into the open, the emotional and familial conflicts that have defined the season continue to intensify. The episode concludes by setting the stage for the search that dominates the events of "Nosho Nosho".

== Production ==
The episode was written and directed by Tina Pakravan and produced by Ali Asadzadeh. As with the rest of the series, it combines romantic drama with the political and social atmosphere of late-1970s Iran. The narrative continues to examine how personal relationships are shaped by family expectations and the broader historical setting.

== Release ==
"Line of Destiny" premiered on Filimo on June 13, 2025, as the eighteenth episode of the first season of Tasian. The episode was released as part of the series' regular Friday schedule and has a runtime of approximately 46 minutes according to official listings.
