= Pedram Sharifi =

Iranian actor (born 1987)

- پدرام شریفی
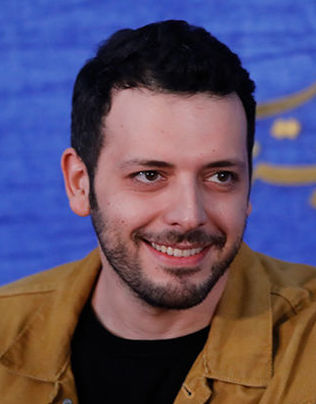
- Sharifi at the 2019 Fajr Film Festival
- Born: August 2, 1987 (age 39); Tehran, Iran
- Occupation: Actor
- Years active: 2012–present

Pedram Sharifi (Persian: پدرام شریفی; born August 2, 1987) is an Iranian actor. He gained recognition after portraying Peyman Sabouri in the romance mystery drama The Accomplice (2020). Sharifi earned a Crystal Simorgh nomination for his performance in Majority (2021). He is also known for his performances in Born in 1987 (2016), When the Moon Was Full (2019) and I Want to Live (2021).

== Filmography ==
=== Film ===
Year	Title	Role	Director	Notes
2012	Dying Twice	Kianoush	Nader Farahwaschy	Short film
2013	Fish & Cat	Pedram	Shahram Mokri	
2013	Daad	Heshmat Mirza	Moha Arzhang	Short film
2016	Born in 1987	Afshar	Majid Tavakoli	
2016	Bodyguard	Elyas	Ebrahim Hatamikia	
2016	Cyanide	Amir Fakhra	Behrouz Shoaybi	
2016	Shadow	Soheil	Masoud Navabi	
2017	Invasion	Shahrouz	Shahram Mokri	
2018	Dirty Job	Farhad	Khosro Masumi	
2018	Maybe it Wasn't Love		Saeed Ebrahimifar	
2019	When the Moon Was Full	Shahab Mansouri	Narges Abyar	
2019	My Second Year in College	Ali	Rasoul Sadrameli	
2019	Don't Forget Today	Reza	Ahmad Monajemi	Short film
2020	Soundless		Behrang Dezfulizadeh	
2021	Majority	Teacher	Mohsen Gharaee	
2022	The Great Leap		Karim Lakzadeh	
2022	The Locust	Pedram	Faezeh Azizkhani	
2023	The Last Birthday	Fahim Dashty	Navid Mahmoudi	
TBA	Pure Blood		Amir Abbasi, Mohammad Safarzadeh	Short film
TBA	Metamorphosis of Narcissus		Hamed Alizadeh	
2026	Inherited		Morteza Alizadeh	

=== Web ===
Year	Title	Role	Director	Platform
2020	The Accomplice	Peyman Sabouri	Mostafa Kiaee	Filimo, Namava
2021	I Want to Live	Nader Sarmad	Sharam Shah Hosseini	Filimo
2024	At the End of the Night	Reza Bozorgmehr	Ida Panahandeh	Filmnet
TBA	1001 Nights		Mostafa Kiaee	Filimo

=== Television ===
Year	Title	Role	Director	Network
2016	Special Patrol	Pedram Kamali	Mehdi Rahmani	IRIB TV1
2020	Soldier	Babak Fakour	Hadi Moghadamdoost	IRIB TV3
