= Viper of Tehran =

2024 Iranian television series

- Genre: Drama; Crime
- Written by: Payman Maadi; Pouya Mahdavizadeh
- Directed by: Saman Moghaddam
- Starring: Payman Maadi
- Composer: Amir Tavassoli
- Country of origin: Iran
- Original language: Persian
- No. of seasons: 1
- No. of episodes: 14

Production
- Producer: Javad Farhani
- Cinematography: Morteza Ghafouri
- Editor: Siamak Mehmandoost

Original release
- Network: Filmnet
- Release: 6 March – 4 June 2024

Viper of Tehran (Persian: افعی تهران, romanized: Af'i-e Tehrān) is a 2025 Iranian television series written by Payman Maadi, directed by Saman Moghaddam, and starring Maadi, alongside an ensemble supporting cast. The series premiered on Filmnet every Wednesday from March 6 to June 4, 2024.

== Plot ==
The film revolves around a serial killer known for poisoning his victims, earning him the nickname "Viper." Interestingly, all of his victims have a history of child abuse. A critic named Arman Biyani decides to direct a film about this case as his debut project. To navigate his relationship with his son properly, Arman consults a psychologist.

== Cast ==
- Payman Maadi as Arman Bayani
  - Babak Malekzadeh as Arman Bayani (child)
- Sahar Dolatshahi as Mozhgan Moshtagh
- Azadeh Samadi as Elaheh
- Mahour Nemati as Babak Bayani
- Mahsa Hejazi as Mona
- Amir Ahmad Ghazvini as Shahriar Shadman
- Bahador Maleki as Farhad Tajik
- Touraj Aslani as Erfan
- Behafarid Ghafarian as Romina
- Niloufar Koukhani as Niloufar
- Ehsan Mansouri as Yavar Bayani
- Merila Zarei as Marzieh
- Pejman Jamshidi as Himself
- Soroush Sehhat as Navazi
- Parisa Sabournezhad as Arman's mother
- Golnoush Ghahremani
- Majid Jozani
- Mohammad Sedighi Mehr as Joudi
- Reza Feizbakhsh as Sina

=== Cameo appearances ===
- Amin Hayai as Himself
- Houman Seyyedi as Himself
- Mehran Modiri as Himself
- Sam Noori as Himself
- Reza Yazdani as Himself
- Mahmoud Gabarloo as Himself
- Abbas Amiri as the Teacher

== Reception ==
=== Awards and nominations ===
Award	Year	Category	Recipient	Result	Ref(s)
Hafez Awards	2024	Best Actor – Television Series Drama	Payman Maadi	Nominated	
Hafez Awards	2024	Best Actress – Television Series Drama	Mahsa Hejazi	Nominated	
Hafez Awards	2024	Best Director – Television Series	Saman Moghaddam	Won	
Hafez Awards	2024	Best Screenplay – Television Series	Payman Maadi, Pouya Mahdavizadeh	Nominated	
Hafez Awards	2024	Best Television Series	Javad Farhani	Nominated	
Hafez Awards	2024	Best Technical and Artistic Achievement	Siamak Mehmandoost	Nominated	
