= I Am Diego Maradona =

I Am Diego Maradona is a 2015 Iranian comedy film directed by Bahram Tavakoli. The script was written by Tavakoli with cinematography by Hooman Behmanesh. Golab Adineh, Saeed Aghakhani, Jamshid Hashempur, Babak Hamidian and Saber Abar starred in the principal roles.

The film was one of the most successful Iranian films of the year and was nominated for multiple awards at the 2015 Fajr Film Festival.
