= Inherited (film) =

- Theatrical release poster
- Persian: مادرزاد
- Directed by: Morteza Alizadeh
- Screenplay by: Morteza Alizadeh
- Produced by: Mahmood Babaei
- Starring: Mina Sadati; Pantea Panahiha; Pedram Sharifi; Saber Abar
- Cinematography: Davood Malek Hosseini
- Edited by: Emad Khodabakhsh
- Release date: November 13, 2026 (Cairo)
- Running time: 99 minutes
- Country: Iran
- Language: Persian

Inherited (Persian title: Madarzad,Persian: مادرزاد) is a 2026 Iranian drama film written and directed by Morteza Alizadeh. The film stars Mina Sadati, Pantea Panahiha, Pedram Sharifi, and Saber Abar. It was selected for the International Competition at the 47th Cairo International Film Festival, where it had its world premiere.

== Synopsis ==
Mina (mina sadati), has been sentenced to death for murder. With little time left before her execution, she attempts to harm herself to delay it, but fellow inmates and prison guards intervene. A prison trustee tells her that the only way to postpone her execution is to become pregnant.

== Cast ==
- Mina Sadati as Mina
- Pantea Panahiha
- Pedram Sharifi
- Saber Abar

== Premiere ==
The film was selected for the International Competition at the 47th Cairo International Film Festival, where it had its world premiere in November 2026. The festival screenings took place in Cairo, Egypt, on November 13, 14, and 15, 2026.
