= Trapped (2013 film) =

- Directed by: Parviz Shahbazi
- Written by: Parviz Shahbazi
- Produced by: Amir Samavati
- Starring: Nazanin Bayati; Pegah Ahangarani; Behrang Alavi; Farid Samavati; Ahmad Mehranfar; Amir Samavati
- Cinematography: Homan Behmanesh
- Edited by: Parviz Shahbazi
- Distributed by: Filmiran
- Release date: September 25, 2013
- Running time: 92 minutes
- Country: Iran
- Language: Persian

Trapped (Persian: دربند Darband) is a 2013 Iranian moral thriller film written and directed by Parviz Shahbazi. The film stars Nazanin Bayati, Pegah Ahangarani, Behrang Alavi, Farid Samavati, Ahmad Mehranfar and Amir Samavati. The director won best director award in 13th Dhaka International Film Festival.== Cast ==

- Nazanin Bayati
- Pegah Ahangarani
- Behrang Alavai
- Ahmad Mehranfar
- Setareh Maleki

== Critical reception ==
There are no registered reviews at Rotten Tomatoes.

According to Alissa Simon in Variety, the movie is a "cautionary tale of universal resonance" that "spins a tension-filled drama about a naive but highly principled young woman from the provinces who comes to Tehran to study medicine, only to wind up in a legal nightmare due to her kind and trusting nature." It "benefits immensely from the smart and sensitive performances of an all-pro cast, particularly the two femme leads."
