= Che (2014 film) =

2014 Iranian war film

- English poster of the film
- Directed by: Ebrahim Hatamikia
- Written by: Ebrahim Hatamikia
- Produced by: Ali Ghaemmaghami
- Starring: Fariborz Arabnia; Saeed Rad; Babak Hamidian; Merila Zarei
- Cinematography: Hossein Jafarian
- Edited by: Mehdi Hosseinivand
- Music by: Fardin Khalatbari
- Release date: February 24, 2014
- Running time: 90 minutes
- Country: Iran
- Language: Persian

Che (Persian: چ) is a 2014 Iranian biographical war film directed by Ebrahim Hatamikia. Che depicts 48 hours in the life of Mostafa Chamran in August 1979, who was then defense minister of Iran. On August 16 and 17, 1979 he was sent by Ayatollah Khomeini to command several military operations in the civil war in the Kordestan region which was besieged by anti-revolutionary forces. The film was submitted to the 32nd Fajr International Film Festival and won two Crystal Simorghs in for best editing and best visual effects. In addition to Chamran the film is also about Asghar Vesali who was killed during the war and the people of Paveh in Kermanshah province.

== Title ==
Che is the seventh letter in Persian alphabet which is the first letter in Mostafa Chamran's family name.

== Plot ==
Six months after 1979 Iranian revolution there were some news that Democratic Party of Iranian Kurdistan and Komalah forces in Kordestan are going to fight against Iranian revolutionary forces and take the freedom of the city in the region. Ordered by Ayatullah Khomeini, Mostafa Chamran is sent to the location to clear the city out of Kurdish forces. He has 48 hours.

== Cast ==
- Fariborz Arabnia as Mostafa Chamran
- Saeed Rad as Valiollah Fallahi
- Babak Hamidian as Asghar Vesali
- Merila Zarei as Hanna
- Payam Laryan as Loyal Soldier
- Mehdi Soltani as Doctor Enayati
- Esmaeel Soltanian as Nazif
- Mohammad Reza Torabi
- Amir Reza Delavari
- Khosrow Shahraz
- Hasan Jamshidi

== Poster controversy ==
Iranian Che poster

American Che poster

The two similar posters

Many Iranian websites noticed the similarity between the original Iranian poster design of the film and the poster for the unrelated 2008 film directed by Steven Soderbergh.
