= Asghar Vesali =

Iranian military personnel (1950–1980)

Ali Asghar Vesali Tehrani Fard
- Born: October 7, 1950
- Died: November 19, 1980 (aged 30)
- Military career
- Allegiance: Iran
- Branch: Islamic Republic of Iran Army Ground Forces
- Conflicts: Iran–Iraq War

Ali Asghar Vesali Tehrani Fard (Persian: علی اصغر وصالی طهرانی فرد), commonly known as Asghar Vesali, was an Iranian military leader. Before the Iranian Revolution, he was a member of the People's Mujahedin of Iran (MEK). After joining the Islamic Revolutionary Guard Corps, he was appointed as a leader of the Red Handkerchief during the Iran-Iraq War. Vesali was killed in Gilan-e Gharb at the age of 30.

== Biography ==
Vesali left Iran to receive military training. He was arrested and imprisoned by the Pahlavi dynasty because of his support for MEK. He was released in late 1976 and did not continue his activities with MEK.

In the beginning of the Islamic Revolution, Vesali was responsible for the Barrack-3 forces' mission to find and arrest members of the Forqan Group.

After the Iranian Revolution, Vesali became a member of the Islamic Revolutionary Guard Corps and was one of the founders of the Foreign Intelligence department. He was then moved to the west of Iran after several attacks had occurred there. He formed groups of soldiers and called them "Red Handkerchief". Mostafa Chamran said: “I met some fighters in Lebanon, but I never saw a man as brave as Vesali”. Vesali married Maryam Kazemzadeh, a correspondent and photographer. She met Vesali when she traveled to Marivan as a reporter, where Chamran introduced them to each other while they were preparing a report on the liberation of Paveh.

On 19 November 1980 (Ashura day), he received a head injury fighting against anti-revolutionary groups in the west of Iran, near Gilan-e Gharb, and died, after he had surgery. Vesali was buried in the Behesht-e Zahra cemetery in Tehran.

== In the media ==
Vesali was featured in the 2014 film Che, with Babak Hamidian playing as Vesali. The film focuses primarily on the fight against anti-revolutionary groups in Paveh.

== See also ==
- 1979 Kurdish rebellion in Iran
