= Espinas Palace Hotel =

Five-star hotel in Tehran, Iran

General information
- Location: Sa'adat Abad, Tehran, Iran, Yadegar-e-Emam Expressway
- Opening: December 28, 2015; 10 years ago
- Owner: Espinas International Hotels Group
- Operator: Espinas International Hotels Group

Technical details
- Floor count: 20

Other information
- Number of rooms: 400
- Number of restaurants: 3

Website
- espinashotels.com

Espinas Palace Hotel (Persian: هتل اسپیناس پالاس) is a five-star hotel located in Sa'adat Abad, District 2 of Tehran, Iran. Opened on 28 December 2015, it is one of the largest luxury hotels in Iran. The hotel is owned and operated by the Espinas International Hotels Group and comprises 20 floors, 400 guest rooms and suites, three restaurants, and more than fourteen conference and banquet halls with capacities ranging from 20 to 1,500 guests.

The hotel was officially inaugurated on 28 December 2015 in the presence of Eshaq Jahangiri, then First Vice President of Iran.

Located on the northwestern hills of Tehran near Yadegar-e-Emam Expressway, the hotel overlooks the city skyline and the Alborz mountain range. It serves both leisure and business travellers and is frequently used as a venue for governmental, diplomatic, corporate and cultural events.

== History ==
Construction of the hotel began in May 2011. Developed by the Espinas International Hotels Group, the project was completed after approximately four years of construction. The hotel officially opened on 28 December 2015 and became the third property operated by the Espinas hotel chain.

Since its opening, Espinas Palace has hosted numerous international conferences, governmental meetings, business summits, exhibitions, diplomatic receptions and private ceremonies, becoming one of Tehran's principal luxury conference hotels.

== Facilities ==
The hotel contains 400 rooms and suites distributed across 20 floors. Accommodation includes standard rooms, business-class rooms, junior suites, luxury suites and presidential suites. The property also features several restaurants, cafés, wellness facilities, fitness amenities and business services.

=== Conference and event facilities ===
Espinas Palace is recognised for its conference and convention facilities, offering more than fourteen meeting rooms and banquet halls with capacities ranging from 20 to 1,500 guests.

==== Palace Hall ====
Palace Hall is the hotel's largest event venue. Designed without interior columns, it accommodates up to 1,500 guests in theatre configuration and approximately 800 guests for banquets. The hall features a spacious foyer, intelligent lighting systems, professional acoustics, large projection screens and simultaneous interpretation facilities, making it suitable for international conferences, concerts and official ceremonies.

==== Grand Hall ====
Grand Hall accommodates up to 800 guests in theatre layout and approximately 450 guests for banquet events. The venue can be divided into two or three independent halls using movable sound-insulated partitions, allowing multiple conferences or workshops to take place simultaneously.

==== Laton Hall ====
Located on the hotel's upper floor, Laton Hall offers panoramic views of Tehran and the Alborz Mountains through floor-to-ceiling glass walls. The hall accommodates up to 350 guests in theatre configuration and approximately 200 guests for banquets. It also provides direct access to a private terrace.

==== Meeting rooms ====
The hotel includes several executive meeting rooms accommodating between 10 and 50 participants. These rooms are equipped with video conferencing systems, LED displays, wireless internet access and presentation facilities.
