= Headquarters for Enjoining the Good and Forbidding the Evil =

The Headquarters for Enjoining the Good and Forbidding the Evil is a government institution in Iran that is responsible for determining and enforcing behavioral models in society, especially regarding the mandatory hijab law for women. It is also known as the Office or Headquarters for the Promotion of Virtue and Prevention of Vice. It is headed by Seyyed Mohammed Saleh Hashemi Golpayegani, who was appointed by the Supreme Leader of Iran, Seyyed Ali Khamenei, on August 25, 2021. The Headquarters for Enjoining the Good and Forbidding the Evil is legally active in Iran and has the authority to coordinate with other agencies, such as the morality police, the judiciary, the Islamic Revolutionary Guard Corps, and the parliament, to monitor and report people who do not comply with the hijab enforcement law and other moral codes.

== Establishment ==
the Islamic Consultative Assembly passed the bill to establish the Headquarters for Enjoining the Good and Forbidding the Evil, which is one of the ten Ancillaries of the Faith In Twelver Shia Islam, in Iran on August 13, 2011. The bill was approved by the Guardian Council on August 23, 2011 and signed by the then president Mahmoud Ahmadinejad on September 5, 2011. The bill gave the Headquarters for Enjoining the Good and Forbidding the Evil the legal authority to coordinate with other organs and agencies to enforce the hijab enforcement law and other moral codes in Iran.

in 2014, after the death of Ali Khalili who injured in a fight over the practice "the enjoining good and forbidding the evil" and died a few years later presumably due to the injuries he received in that fight, Islamic Consultative Assembly passed another bill called the bill to protection of enjoiners of good and forbidders of the evil to protect those civilians who want to practice it spontaneously.

== Sanctions ==
The Headquarters for Enjoining the Good and Forbidding the Evil is subject to sanctions by the UK and other countries for being involved in the commission of some human rights violations or abuse in Iran.
