= Abbas Amiri (actor) =

Iranian stage actor and assistant director

- عباس امیری
- Occupations: Stage actor, assistant director and theatre photographer

Abbas Amiri (عباس امیری) is an Iranian stage actor, assistant director, production planner and theatre photographer. His documented work includes acting in Hamid Reza Azarang's production of Train, serving as assistant director on Ali Sarabi's productions of Bernard Is Dead and The Other Side of the Mirror, and photographing several theatrical productions.

== Career ==
In 2009, Amiri was credited as the production photographer for Gharibe dar Khaneh (غریبه در خانه; "A Stranger in the House"), a play directed by Delara Noushin and staged at Tehran's Molavi Hall.

Amiri subsequently worked on the television play Hoviat (هویت; "Identity"), produced by Islamic Republic of Iran Broadcasting's Channel 4 in 2010. He was credited as an assistant to artistic director Ali Sarabi and as the production's stage manager. Masoud Foroutan served as the television director.

In 2011, he was the production photographer for Aftab az Milan Tolou Mikonad (آفتاب از میلان طلوع می‌کند; "The Sun Rises from Milan"), written and directed by Arash Abbasi. He was also credited as the photographer of Lobby (لابی), a play written by Abbasi and directed by Beita Elahian at the Workshop Hall of Tehran's City Theatre.

In October 2015, Amiri was credited as the assistant director of Bernard Is Dead (برنارد مرده است), Ali Sarabi's first stage-directing production. The play was written by Mashhood Mohsenian as a free adaptation of the novel The Wolves and was prepared for performance at the Ostad Nazerzadeh Kermani Hall of the Iranshahr Theatre in Tehran.

In February 2017, Amiri appeared in Train (ترن), a stage production written and directed by Hamid Reza Azarang. The production opened at the main hall of Tehran's City Theatre complex. Its cast also included Amir Jafari, Mehraveh Sharifinia, Nasim Adabi, Vahid Aghapour and Ali Amel Hashemi.

Later in 2017, Amiri worked as assistant director and production planner on The Other Side of the Mirror (آن سوی آینه), directed by Ali Sarabi. The production was based on a play by French playwright Florian Zeller, translated into Persian by Tinoush Nazmjou, and staged at the Shahrzad Theatre in Tehran.

== Selected credits ==
Year	Production	Medium	Credit	Director
2009	Gharibe dar Khaneh (غریبه در خانه)	Theatre	Photographer	Delara Noushin
2010	Hoviat (هویت)	Television play	Assistant to the artistic director; stage manager	Ali Sarabi and Masoud Foroutan
2011	Aftab az Milan Tolou Mikonad (آفتاب از میلان طلوع می‌کند)	Theatre	Photographer	Arash Abbasi
2011	Lobby (لابی)	Theatre	Photographer	Beita Elahian
2015	Bernard Is Dead (برنارد مرده است)	Theatre	Assistant director	Ali Sarabi
2017	Train (ترن)	Theatre	Actor	Hamid Reza Azarang
2017	The Other Side of the Mirror (آن سوی آینه)	Theatre	Assistant director and production planner	Ali Sarabi
