= Mass Media Regulatory Authority Organization =

Iranian Mass Media Regulatory Authority Organization (SATRA) is an Iranian Islamic Republic government agency, a subsidiary of IRIB fully in charge of issuing permits for all mass media and IPTV websites of Iran, sharing some responsibilities with Ministry of Islamic Culture and Guidance after 2023 executive order by Supreme Cultural Revolution Council.

The organization has been criticized for imposing extreme censorship and establishing online content monopoly.

== Timeline ==
In October–September 2024, SATRA deleted all 100 terabytes of files from a data center after reported criminal content. The agency has also closed more than 20 content platform websites in the two-month period.

In November 2024, SATRA shutdown the interview talk show Aknoon produced by TV celebrity Soroush Sehhat.

SATRA ordered an interview by Adel Ferdosipour to be deleted and banned.
