= Once Upon a Time in Iran =

2021–2022 Iranian television series

- Persian: خاتون
- Genre: Drama; Romance; Historical
- Written by: Tina Pakravan
- Directed by: Tina Pakravan
- Starring: Negar Javaherian; Ashkan Khatibi; Mirsaeed Molavian
- Opening theme: "Once Upon a Time in Iran" by Kayhan Kalhor
- Ending theme: "Khatoon" by Kayhan Kalhor
- Composer: Kayhan Kalhor
- Country of origin: Iran
- Original language: Persian
- No. of seasons: 1
- No. of episodes: 23

Production
- Producer: Ali Asadzadeh
- Production location: Iran
- Cinematography: Houman Behmanesh
- Editor: Mohammad Najarian
- Running time: 50 minutes

Original release
- Network: Namava
- Release: 9 August 2021 – 4 April 2022

Once Upon a Time in Iran or Khatoon (Persian: خاتون, romanized: Khatoon) is an Iranian historical drama romance television series created by Tina Pakravan, starring Negar Javaherian, Ashkan Khatibi and Mirsaeed Molavian, alongside an ensemble supporting cast. The first episode of this series was released on Namava on 9 August 2021.

== Premise ==
The story of Once Upon a Time in Iran takes place during the years of World War II. Khatoon (Negar Javaherian), a Bakhtiari woman, is married to Shirzad (Ashkan Khatibi), a soldier during the reign of Reza Shah Pahlavi. At this time, although Iran has declared neutrality in this war, northern Iran is occupied by the Soviet Union and southern Iran is occupied by the British. At the instigation of Commissioner Rajabov, Shirzad is forced to divorce Khatoon, who has been arrested many times for political reasons. In the meantime, Khatoon, in search of her father, who is an exiled prisoner, flees to Tehran with the help of a man named Reza Fakhar(Mirsaeed Molavian), who later falls in love with her. Now we witness the simultaneous love of Khatoon's ex-husband Shirzad and Reza Fakhar for Khatoon.

== Cast ==
=== Main ===
- Negar Javaherian as Khatoon Bakhtiari
- Ashkan Khatibi as Shirzad Malek
- Mirsaeed Molavian as Reza Fakhar
- Babak Hamidian as Commissar Rajabof

=== Recurring ===
- Reza Behboudi as Dr. Bukowski
- Shabnam Moghaddami as Fakhr al-Nasa
- Shahrokh Foroutanian as Fereydoun Khan
- Mahtab Servati as Mary
- Mehran Modiri as Jahangir Roozbeh
- Mehran Ghafourian as Mosio
- Setareh Eskandari as Reyhaneh Fakhar
- Babak Karimi as Haji Zarrabi
- Roya Nonahali as Mehrbanoo
- Mohammad-Reza Sharifinia as Mir Azim
- Pantea Panahiha as Gohar
- Setareh Pesyani as Parvin
- Bizhan Emkanian as Esfandiar Bakhtiari
- Behnaz Jafari as Raana
- Banipal Shoomoon as Oorang
- Mehdi Ghorbani as Farhad
- Samaneh Moniri as Goli
- Payam Dehkordi as Nazarbeyg
- Maria Shelkunova as Helena
- Kamyar Haghi as Yan Homolka
- Aida Mahiani as Barbara Kowalska
- Farrokh Nemati as Brigadier Aria
- Peyman Mirzaei as Nasib
- Benyamin Norouzi as Amirali
- Shrin Mohseni as Gol Khanoom
- Reza Abbasi as Gol Agha

=== Guest ===
- Soroush Sehhat as Mr. Akhavan
- Atefeh Razavi as Ghodrat
- Pejman Bazeghi as Colonel Sangari
- Ghazal Shakeri as Fahimeh Akbar
- Bahnam Sharifi as Namjoo
- Sohrab Fatemi as Sergeant MacArthur

=== Advertising and visual identity ===
- Mehdi Javadinasab as Graphic Designer
- A4 Design House as Visual Identity Design

== Episodes ==
Episode number	Episode title	Episode time	Date of Release
1	Once the sun rises tomorrow	53:51	9 August 2021
On the 2nd of August 1941, Gilan was living it life until the BBC radio interrupted it story program and said: When the sun rises tomorrow.
2	We had declared neutrality	54:25	21 August 2021
The lives of Khatoon and Shirzad, like the rest of the Iranian people, were involved in an unwanted war. Although we declared neutrality, the Allies violated it and ...
3	Vive l'Iran	54:51	23 August 2021
And Iran lost in a few days in the war and was occupied by the Allies. While all the people of Iran were shouting: Payandeh Bada Iran...
4	Happy New Year, my son	52:19	30 August 2021
Northern Iran was occupied by Soviet forces. Shirzad was in prison and Khatoon was taking responsibility for the family ...
5	Hold your fire	55:01	6 September 2021
The Iranian people bravely stood up to the occupiers. Khatoon, who has a heart for Iran, could not just sit in silence and watch despite mourning.
6	Shirzad will never divorce me	51:40	13 September 2021
Shirzad kept Khatoon in prison on the orders of Red Army forces. But Rajabov insists that Khatoon should be handed over to the Allied prison, unless..
7	I have to go to Tehran	57:41	20 September 2021
Shirzad is looking for Khatoon and Khatoon is seeking freedom and both are confused, like the Poles who have not yet calmed down and had to take a different path.
8 (The Final Episode Of Volume 1)	You really are Robin Hood	49:37	4 October 2021
Khatoon has no way from Qazvin to Tehran. But Iran is in occupation, that is, danger is lurking...

== Reception ==
=== Critical response ===
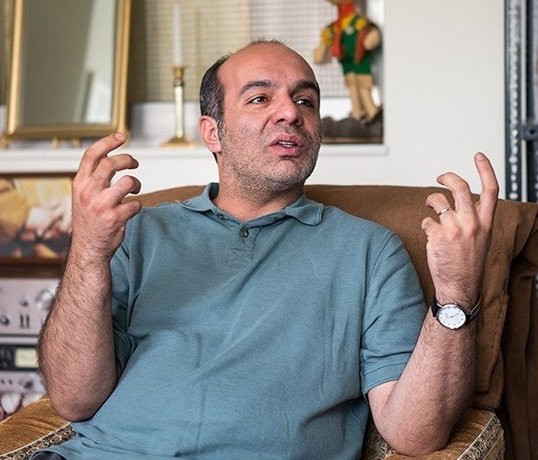
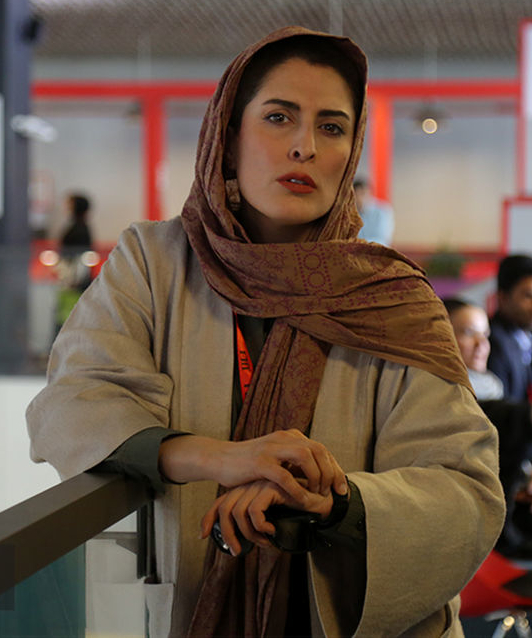
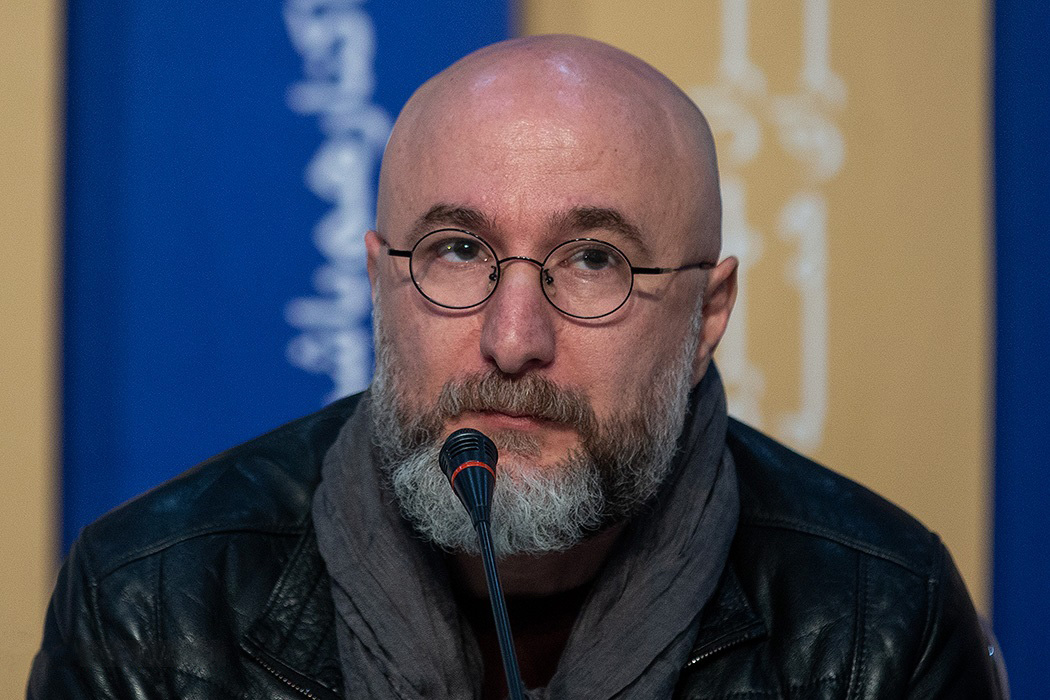
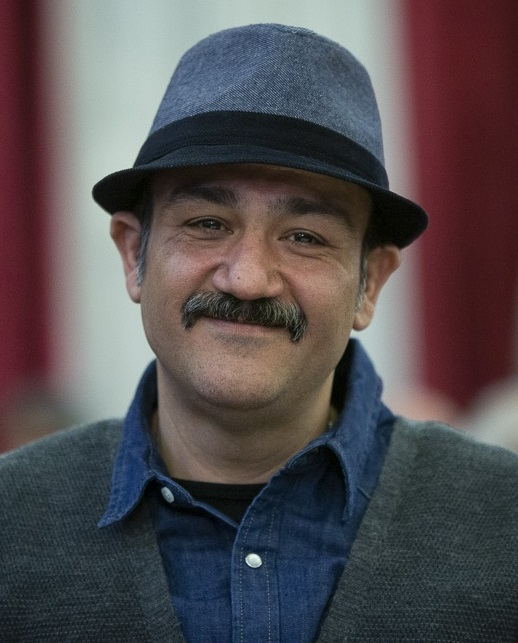
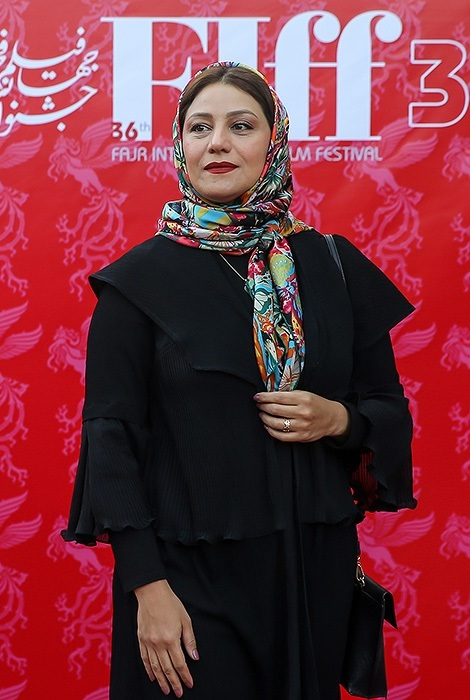
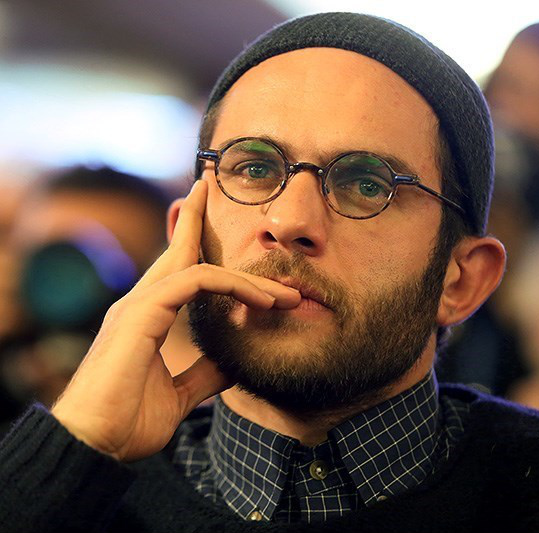
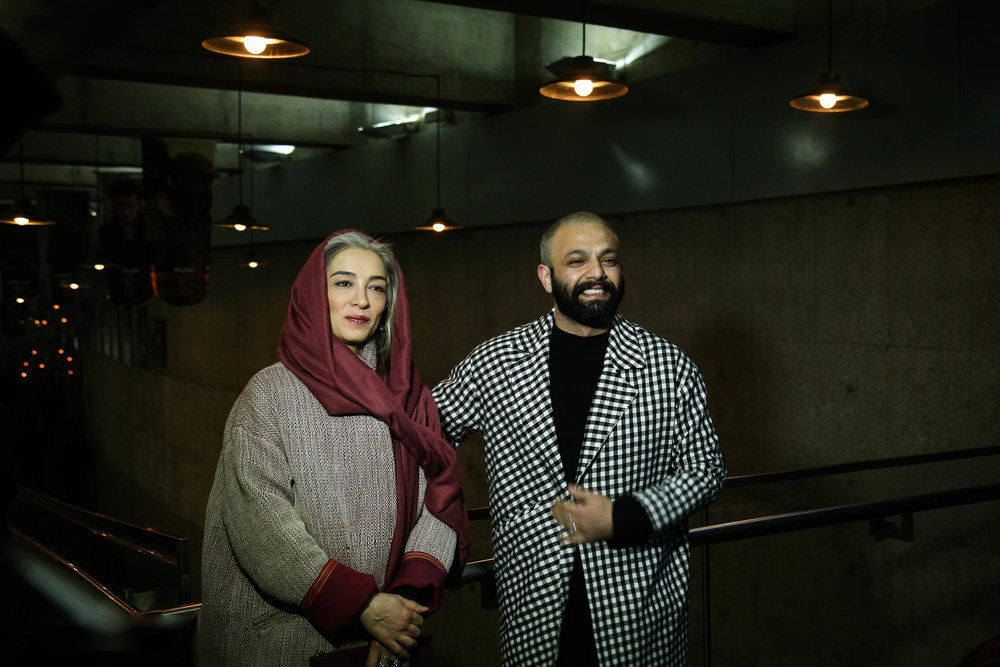
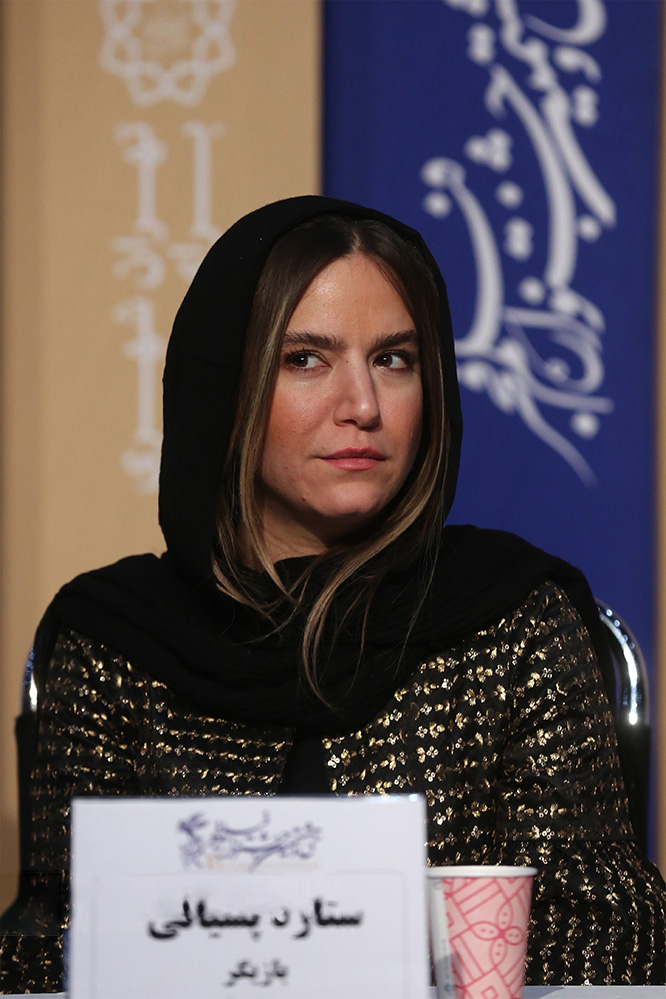
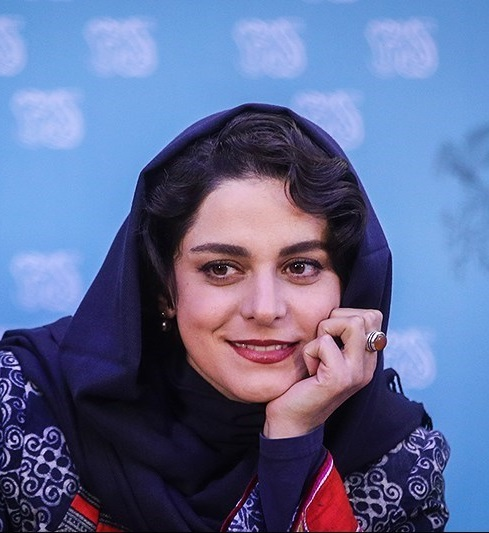
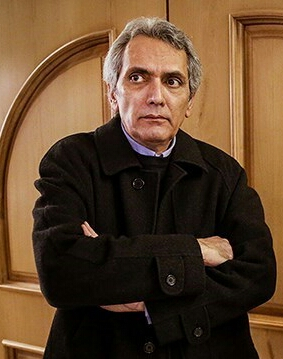
Critics widely praised the supporting performances of Payam Dehkordi, Behnaz Jafari, Reza Behboodi, Mehran Ghafourian, Shabnam Moghaddami (top), Babak Hamidian, Pantea Panahiha, Setareh Pesyani, Ghazal Shakeri, and Farokh Nemati (bottom).

=== Awards and nominations ===
Year	Award	Category	Recipient	Result	Ref.
2022	1st Iranian Cinema Directors' Great Celebration	Best Home Video Director	Tina Pakravan	Won	
