= Atefeh Razavi =

Iranian actress and make-up artist

- عاطفه رضوی
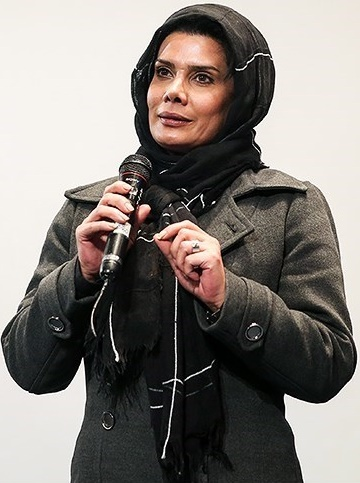
- Born: March 9, 1969 (age 57); Tehran, Iran
- Other name: Atefeh Razavi-Nia
- Years active: 1986–present
- Spouse(s): Mehrdad Shekarabi (divorced) Hossein Pakdel

Atefeh Razavi (Persian: عاطفه رضوی, born March 6, 1969) is an Iranian actress and make-up artist.

== Filmography ==
=== Film ===
- An Soo-ye Atash (Across the Fire), 1986
- Zir-e Bamha-ye Shahr, 1989
- Nargess, 1992
- Yek Mard, Yek Khers (A Man, A Bear), 1993
- Zinat, 1993
- Chehreh, 1995
- Nejat Yaftegan (The Rescued), 1995
- Banoo-ye Ordibehesht (The May Lady), 1997
- Tales of Kish (The Greek Ship episode), 1999
- Dance of Death, 2000
- Gahi Be Aseman Negah Kon, 2002
- Angel Street Bride, 2021

=== Web ===
Year	Title	Role	Director	Platform
2021	Once Upon a Time in Iran	Ghodrat	Tina Pakravan	Namava
2025	Tasian	Shokouh	Tina Pakravan	Filimo
