= Morteza Alizadeh =

Iranian film director and screenwriter

- مرتضی علیزاده
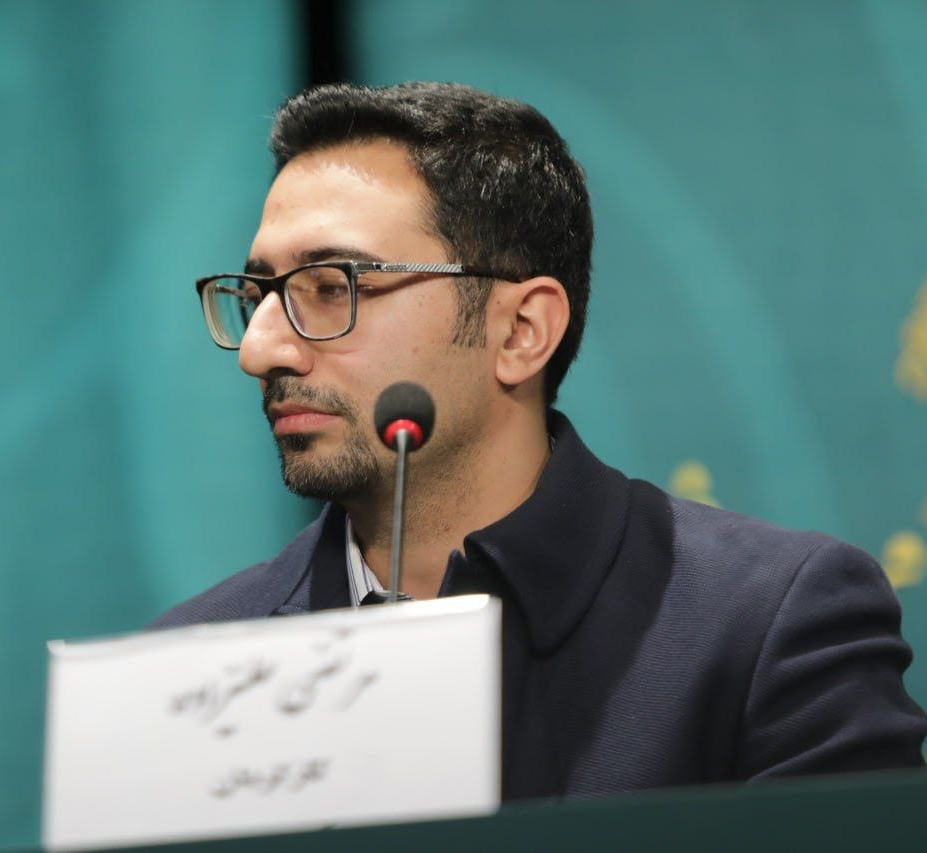
- Morteza Alizadeh at the press conference of the film bodiless at the 42nd Fajr Film Festival
- Born: 1990 (age 35–36)
- Occupations: Film director and Screenwriter
- Years active: 2008–present

Morteza Alizadeh (Persian: مرتضی علیزاده; born 1990, Mashhad) is an Iranian film director and screenwriter. Alizadeh won Tehran International Short Film Festival Award for Best Adapted Film. He nominated for the best first director at the Fajr Film Festival.

== Career ==
Morteza Alizadeh was born in 1990 and started cinema experimentally in 2008. He has directed many short films, and his latest work, "Write legibly" was presented at the Tehran Short Film Festival and was nominated in four categories, and finally won the award for the best adapted screenplay. The film Bodiless with the criminal, social genre is his first cinematic experience, which is present in the New Look section of the 42nd Fajr Film Festival.

== As director ==
=== Films ===
- Bodiless
- Inherited

=== Short films ===
- Write legibly

== Awards and nominations ==
In October 2023, he won Book and Cinema Award and Tehran Municipality Award for "Write legibly" his short film. In October 2023, he won Tehran International Short Film Festival Award for Best Adapted Film. In February 2024, he nominated for the best first director at the Fajr Film Festival.
