= Pantea Panahiha =

Iranian actress (born 1977)

- پانته‌آ پناهی‌ها
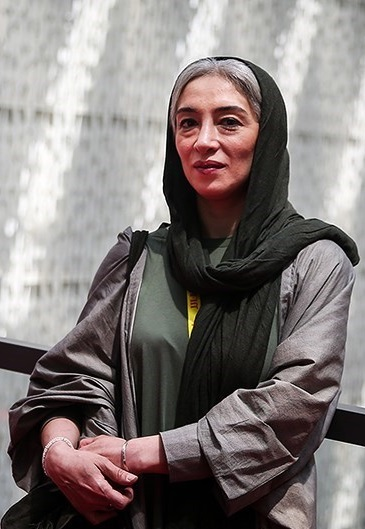
- Panahiha in 2016
- Born: November 29, 1977 (age 48); Tehran, Iran
- Education: Soore University
- Occupations: Actress; casting director; script supervisor
- Years active: 2001–present

Pantea Panahiha (Persian: پانته‌آ پناهی‌ها; born November 29, 1977) is an Iranian actress and. She is best known for her performance in Breath (2016), which was selected as the Iranian entry for the Best Foreign Language Film at the 90th Academy Awards, but was not nominated.

== Filmography ==
=== Film ===
Year	Title	Role	Director	Notes	Ref(s)
2001	Scent of Paradise	Hamid's family friend	Hamid Reza Mohseni		
2003	Don't Kill That Man	Woman in love	Mohammad Arbabian		
2006	The Confrontation		Saeed Ebrahimifar		
2013	Acrid	Azar	Kiarash Asadizadeh		
2013	Lady	Reza's wife	Tina Pakravan		
2014	Ginkgo: Suspended Narrative		Touraj Aslani		
2015	I Am Diego Maradona	Lili	Bahram Tavakoli		
2015	The Buffalo		Kaveh Sajjadi Hosseini		
2015	In Silence	Firouzeh	Zharzh Hashemzadeh		
2016	Duet	Samira	Navid Danesh		
2016	Sister		Marjan Ashrafizadeh		
2016	Breath	Bahar's grandmother	Narges Abyar		
2016	Red Nail Polish	Azam	Seyyed Jamal Seyyed Hatami		
2016	Arvand	Mahboobeh	Pourya Azarbayjani		
2016	We Will Not Get Used To	Samar	Ebrahim Ebrahimian		
2018	Nostalgia Celebration	Afsaneh	Pourya Azarbayjani		
2019	Suddenly a Tree	Psychiatrist	Safi Yazdanian		
2019	Jamshidieh	Charkchi's wife	Yalda Jebeli		
2019	Darkhoongah	Shahrzad	Siavash Asadi		
2020	Exodus	Mehrbanoo	Ebrahim Hatamikia		
2020	Tale of the Sea	Mahin	Bahman Farmanara		
2021	Hit the Road	Mother	Panah Panahi		
2022	Squad of Girls	Vajihe	Monir Gheidi		
2022	19		Manijeh Hekmat		
2023	After Leaving		Reza Nejati		
2023	Leather Jacket Man	Zari	Hossein Mirzamohammadi		
2023	Captain	Ms. Nazari	Mohammad Hamzei		
2023	Empty Nets	Amir's mother	Behrooz Karamizadeh		
2023	In the Form of Love	Forough	Siavash Asadi		
2023	Maria	Zohreh	Mahdi Asghari Azghadi		
2023	Hedgehog	Mahrokh	Mastaneh Mohajer		
2024	Stepmother		Negar Naghavi	Short film	
2024	For Rana	Soudabeh	Iman Yazdi		
2024	Aryashahr, Two People	Nahid	Hamid Bahramian		
2025	Red Shades	Kati	Hossein Mahkam		
TBA	Grape Seeds		Ebrahim Ebrahimian	Filming	
2026	Inherited		Morteza Alizadeh		

=== Web ===
Year	Title	Role	Director	Platform	Notes	Ref(s)
2015–2017	Shahrzad	Sharbat	Hassan Fathi	Lotus Play	Supporting role; season 1	
2019–2020	Rhino	Vanousheh Azimi	Kiarash Asadizadeh	Filimo, Namava	Main role	
2021–2022	Once Upon a Time in Iran	Gohar	Tina Pakravan	Namava	Supporting role; also as casting director	
2023	The Translator	Nahid	Bahram Tavakoli	Namava	Main role	
2023	The Marsh	Afagh	Borzou Niknejad	Filmnet	Main role	
2025	Tasian	Homa Nejat	Tina Pakravan	Filimo	Main role	
2025	Girls of Grief Alley	Soraya	Ali Jafarabadi	Filmnet	Main role	
2025	1001 Nights		Mostafa Kiaee	Filimo	Main role	

=== Television ===
Year	Title	Role	Director	Notes	Network	Ref(s)
2017–2018	Lady of the Mansion	Afsarolmolouk	Azizollah Hamidnezhad	TV series; main role	IRIB TV3	

== Awards and nominations ==
Award	Year	Category	Nominated Work	Result	Ref(s)
Fajr Film Festival	2015	Best Actress in a Supporting Role	I Am Diego Maradona	Nominated	
Fajr Film Festival	2019	Best Actress in a Supporting Role	Darkhoongah	Nominated	
Fajr Film Festival	2023	Best Actress in a Supporting Role	After Leaving	Nominated	
Fajr International Film Festival	2016	Best Actress in a Leading Role	Breath	Won	
Hafez Award	2017	Best Actress – Motion Picture	Breath	Nominated	
Hafez Award	2019	Best Actress – Television Series Drama	Lady of the Mansion	Won	
Hafez Award	2024	Best Actress – Television Series Drama	The Marsh	Nominated	
Iran Cinema Celebration	2015	Best Actress in a Supporting Role	Acrid	Won	
Iran Cinema Celebration	2017	Best Actress in a Leading Role	Breath	Nominated	
Iran Cinema Celebration	2017	Best Actress in a Supporting Role	Red Nail Polish	Won	
Iran Cinema Celebration	2018	Best Actress in a Supporting Role	Nostalgia Celebration	Nominated	
Iran's Film Critics and Writers Association	2015	Best Actress in a Supporting Role	I Am Diego Maradona	Nominated	
Iran's Film Critics and Writers Association	2016	Best Actress in a Leading Role	Breath	Nominated	
Urban International Film Festival	2022	Best Actress	Squad of Girls	Nominated	
