= Nazanin Bayati =

Iranian actress (born 1990)

- نازنین بیاتی
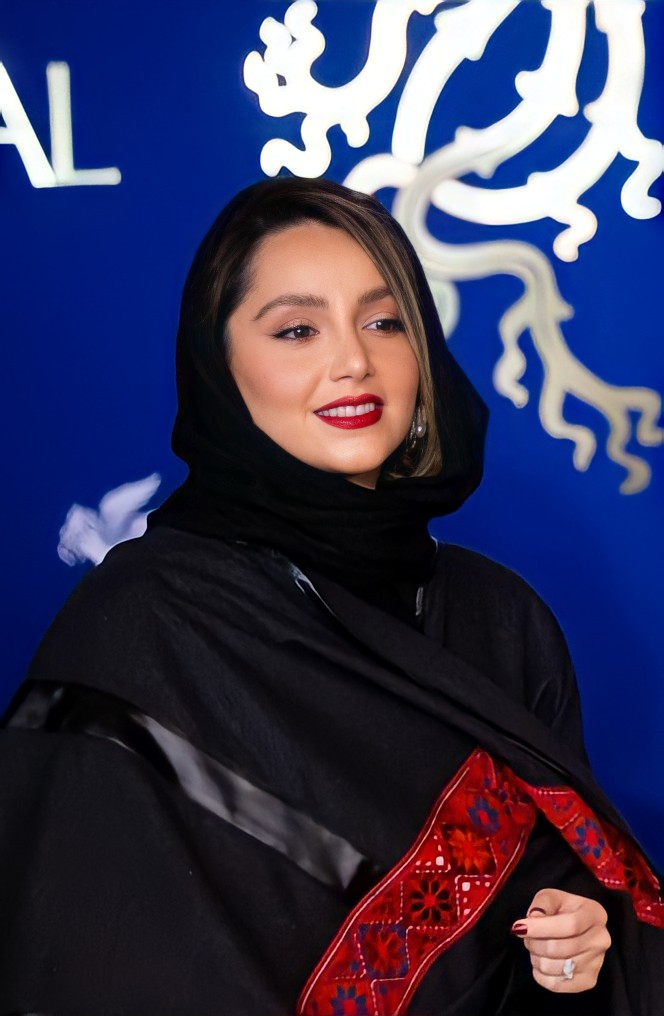
- Bayati at the 2022 Fajr Film Festival
- Born: January 5, 1990 (age 36); Tehran, Iran
- Education: Islamic Azad University
- Occupation: Actress
- Years active: 2011–present

Nazanin Bayati (Persian: نازنین بیاتی; born in Tehran, January 5, 1990) is an Iranian actress. She made her feature film debut in Parviz Shahbazi's Trapped (2013). For her performance in the film, she earned a Crystal Simorgh and a Hafez Award nomination.

== Early life ==
Nazanin Bayati’s parents hail from Qom and Tafresh, two cities in Iran. She has two sisters named Naghmeh and Neda.

Nazanin Bayati is a theater graduate of Tonekabon Islamic Azad University.

Nazanin Bayati shone in her first film appearance in Darband and was nominated for Crystal Simorgh for Best Actress in a Leading Role at the 31st Fajr International Film Festival. She also won the statuette for the best comedy actress from the 19th Hafez Festival for her role in Golshifteh's home drama series.

Nazanin Bayati appeared in the Shakeristan puppet TV series as a stage designer, costume designer, and voice actor for the characters of "Dream and Prophet" with Hassan Radfar.

== Filmography ==
=== Film ===
Year	Title	Role	Director	Notes
2013	Trapped	Nazanin	Parviz Shahbazi	Nominated – Crystal Simorgh Fajr Film Festival Award for Best Actress
2014	Obit	Reyhan	Ebrahim Ebrahimian	
2014	Dying in September	Parisa	Hatef Alimardani	
2014	Angels Descend Together	Leila	Hamed Mohammadi	
2015	Crazy Rook	Ghazal Moshtagh	Abolhassan Davoodi	
2015	Sweet Taste of Imagination	Shirin	Kamal Tabrizi	
2016	Parting	Maryam	Navid Mahmoudi	
2016	Not Yet		Reza Goran	Short film
2017	Motherhood	Nava	Rogiye Tavakoli	
2017	Wing Mirror	Mahnaz	Manouchehr Hadi	
2018	Sheeple	Mona	Houman Seyyedi	Cameo
2019	Pig Gene	Mahi	Saeed Soheili	
2019	Zaferanieh, July 5	Mahrokh	Ali Hashemi	
2021	Dynamite	Sanaz Goodarzi	Masoud Atyabi	
2022	The Late Father	Pari	Hossein Namazi	
2022	Sag Band	Fatemeh	Mehran Ahmadi	
2023	People's Wedding	Shima Jahed	Majid Tavakoli	
2023	Hedgehog		Mastaneh Mohajer	
2025	Turtle		Bahman Kamyar	
2025	The House of Ghosts		Kiarash Asadizadeh	Completed in 2020
TBA	It Was Winter	Shirin	Vahid Parshad	Post-production

=== Theater ===
Year	Title	Type	Role	Venue
2014	Red and Others	Stage reading	Reader	Gholhak Cinema Complex
2017	A Home at the end of Bahar street	Play	Laleh	IranShahr theater
2017	Yesterday (A minute of silence)	Play		City Theater of Tehran
2018	Void of night, void of you	Concert performance	Narrator	Azadi Tower
2018-2019	The Lari Rooster	Play	Papati	IranShahr theater
2019	The Corpse Bride	Musical theatre	Emily	Espinas Palace Hotel
2023	The Colonel	Play	Irene and the Teacher	Vahdat Hall
2026	The Sons of Fereydun	Play	Shahrnāz	Vahdat Hall

=== Series ===
Year	Title	Role	Director	Platform
2018	Golshifteh	Goli Delgosha	Behrouz Shoeibi	Filimo
2019	Mannequin	Hamta Mehregan	Hossein Soheilizadeh	Filimo, Namava
2023–present	Seven	Angineh Markarian	Kiarash Asadizadeh	Tamashakhaneh
2024	The North Pole	Sahra Zamani	Amin Mahmoudi Yekta	Filimo
2025	Tasian	Maryam Saman	Tina Pakravan	Filimo

== Awards and nominations ==
Year	Award	Category	Nominated Work	Result	Ref.
Fajr Film Festival	2012	Best Actress in a Leading Role	Trapped	Nominated	
Hafez Festival	2014	Best Actress – Motion Picture	Trapped	Nominated	
Hafez Festival	2019	Best Actress – Television Series Comedy	Golshifteh	Won	
Hafez Festival	2020	Best Actress – Television Series Drama	Mannequin	Nominated	
Iran's Film Critics and Writers Association	2013	Best Actress in a Leading Role	Trapped	Won	
