= Saber Abar =

Iranian actor (born 1984)

- صابر اَبَر
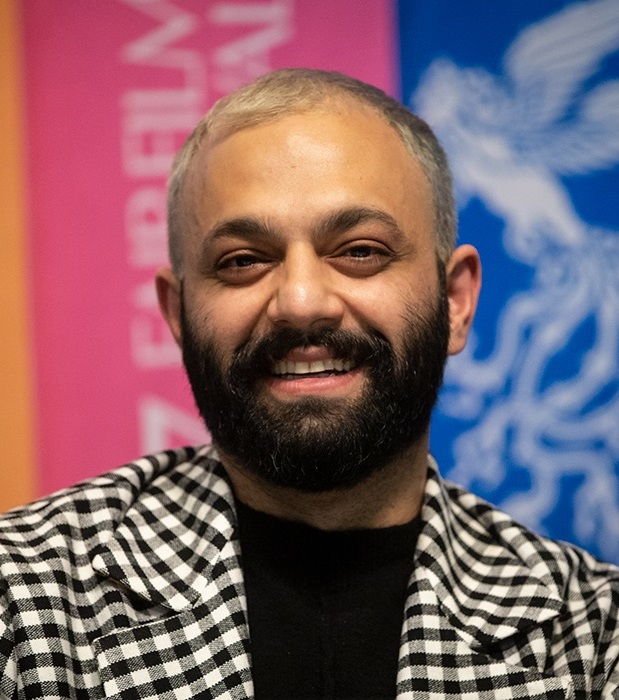
- Abar at the 2019 Fajr Film Festival
- Born: June 8, 1984 (age 42); Tehran, Iran
- Education: Azad University
- Occupations: Actor; director; writer; photographer

Saber Abar (Persian: صابر اَبَر; born June 8, 1984) is an Iranian actor, director and writer. He is best known for his performance in About Elly (2008), directed by Academy Award-winning Asghar Farhadi. He has received various accolades, including two Iran Cinema Celebration Awards and an Iran's Film Critics and Writers Association Award, in addition to nominations for two Crystal Simorghs and two Hafez Awards.

== Career ==
=== Acting career ===
Abar began his career hosting television shows such as Rainbow, a children's TV show, and a game show called In 100 Seconds. He later gained recognition with his role in Mohsen Makhmalbaf's Sha'ere Zobale. In 2006, he starred alongside Ezzatollah Entezami in Minaye Shahr-e Khamush as a driver and that role earned him a Crystal Simorgh Prize Nomination for Best Supporting Actor. Abar's talent did not go unnoticed in Dayere Zangi (2007), as he then was offered a role in Asghar Farhadi's About Elly. The movie received positive reviews, such as the review from David Bordwell, who called it a masterpiece. Abar played "Alireza", whose fiancée goes missing. The role earned him another nomination in the Fajr International Film Festival.

Saber has also starred in Hich (2009), Nokhodi (2009), Thirteen 59 (2010) and Entehaye Khiabane Hashtom (2010) and had a cameo appearance in Ayene-haye Ruberu (2010).

He plays the main role in The Frog.

=== Theatre career ===
Abar has starred alongside the likes of Farhad Aeesh, Mehdi Hashemi and Shahab Hosseini in Kargadan (2008), directed by Farhad Aeesh. He has also starred in Dastan-e yek Pellekan (2009), directed by Reza Guran, Caligula (2010), directed by Homayoun Ghanizadeh, and Jire-bandie pare Khorus baraye Sugvari (2011), directed by Ali Narges Nejad. In 2010, Saber directed the play Vav-ha va Virgul-ha.

=== Writing ===
Abar wrote a bilingual book, "To Seven Houses Away," about Iranian grandmothers across the country of Iran, published by Inja, Middle Of The Town (اینجا میان شهر) in Tehran. An e-book has also been published on the controversies involving Saber Abar called Saber Abar, The Cost of Playing by Salar Bil.

== Filmography ==
=== Film ===
Year	Title	Role	Director	Notes	Ref(s)
2005	Poet of the Wastes		Mohammad Ahmadi		
2007	Colors of Memory	Iraj Bahrami	Amir Shahab Razavian		
2008	Tambourine	Mohammad	Parisa Bakhtavar		
2008	Three Women	Hamed	Manijeh Hekmat		
2009	About Elly	Alireza	Asghar Farhadi		
2009	Lil' Pea		Jalal Fatemi		
2009	Do Not Get a Reward from the President		Kamal Tabrizi		
2010	Nothing	Nima	Abdolreza Kahani		
2011	Thirteen 59		Saman Salur		
2011	Here Without Me	Ehsan	Bahram Tavakoli		
2011	Facing Mirrors	Sadegh	Negar Azarbeyjani		
2011	Mr. Yousef	Sirous	Ali Rafi'i		
2012	Kissing the Moon-Like Face		Homayoun As'adian		
2012	Modest Reception		Mani Haghighi		
2012	The Snow on the Pines		Payman Maadi		
2012	At the End of 8th Street	Bahram	Alireza Amini		
2013	Shallow Yellow Sky	Mehran	Bahram Tavakoli		
2013	Nowhere, Nobody	Davood	Ebrahim Sheibani		
2013	Acrid	Khosrow	Kiarash Asadizadeh		
2013	Lovely Trash	Amir	Mohsen Amiryousefi		
2014	Sending a Condolences Ad for Newspaper	Taha	Ebrahim Ebrahimian		
2014	Tales	Narges's husband	Rakhshan Banietemad		
2014	Everything for Sale	Akbar	Amir Hossein Saghafi		
2014	Dreamy	Houman	Fereydoun Jeyrani		
2015	Closer	Ali	Mostafa Ahmadi		
2015	Crazy Rook	Kaveh Najm	Abolhassan Davoodi		
2015	I Am Diego Maradona	The Writer	Bahram Tavakoli		
2015	Dowry's Sugar Bowl	Atta	Ali Mollagholipour		
2017	Villa Dwellers	Hamid	Monir Gheidi		
2017	Searing Summer	Farhad	Ebrahim Irajzad		
2017	Meyami's Millioner	Reza	Mostafa Ahmadi		
2018	Pig	Himself	Mani Haghighi		
2018	Hat-trick	Keyvan	Ramtin Lavafi		
2018	Tale of the Sea	Amir Dashti	Bahman Farmanara		
2018	I Want to Dance		Bahman Farmanara		
2018	In Between	Detective	Aliyar Rasti	Short film	
2019	A Hairy Tale	Danesh	Homayoun Ghanizadeh		
2019	Russian	Ebrahim	Amir Hossein Saghafi		
2021	Under Low Light		Mohammad Parvizi		
2022	No Prior Appointment	Attorney	Behrouz Shoeibi		
2022	Without Her	Babak	Arian Vazirdaftari		
2023	After Leaving	Arash	Reza Nejati		
2023	Leather Jacket Man	Agent	Hossein Mirzamohammadi		
2023	A Relic of the South	Rana's boss	Hossein Amiri Doomari, Pedram Pouramiri		
2023	Maria	Peyman	Mehdi Asghar Azghadi		
2024	Summer Time	Amir	Mahmoud Kalari		
2024	The Great Yawn of History	Malek	Aliyar Rasti		
2025	Turtle		Bahman Kamyar		
2026	Inherited		Morteza Alizadeh		

=== Web ===
Year	Title	Role	Director	Platform	Notes	Ref(s)
2020–2021	The Frog	Ramin Fayazi	Houman Seyyedi	Namava	Leading role	
2023	The Translator	Mohandes	Bahram Tavakoli	Namava	Main role	
2024	The Loser	Kaveh Badrloo	Amin Hosseinpour	Filimo	Main role	
2025	Tasian	Saeed	Tina Pakravan	Filimo	Main role	
2025	Cankel		Ramtin Lavafi	Starnet	Main role	

== Awards and nominations ==
Year	Award	Category	Nominated film work title	Result	Location	Notes
2007	Crystal Simorgh Award, 25th Fajr Film Festival	Best Supporting Actor	Colors of Memory	Nominated	Tehran, Iran	
2007	11th Iran Cinema Celebration	Best Supporting Actor	Colors of Memory	Won	Tehran, Iran	
2009	Crystal Simorgh Award, 27th Fajr Film Festival	Best Supporting Actor	About Elly	Nominated	Tehran, Iran	
2010	14th Iran Cinema Celebration	Best Supporting Actor	About Elly	Won	Tehran, Iran	
2010	3rd Iran's Film Critics and Writers Association Award	Best Supporting Actor	About Elly	Won	Tehran, Iran	
2013	6th Iran's Film Critics and Writers Association Award	Best Supporting Actor	The Snow on the Pines	Nominated	Tehran, Iran	
2013	6th Iran's Film Critics and Writers Association Award	Best Supporting Actor	Kissing the Moon-Like Face	Nominated	Tehran, Iran	
2013	8th Rome Film Festival	Best Emerging Actors and Actresses (for entire cast)	Acrid	Won	Rome, Italy	
