= Mahsa Hejazi =

Iranian actress (born 1994)

- مهسا حجازی
- Mahsa Hejazi in Tasian in 2025
- Born: October 8, 1994 (age 31); Tehran, Iran
- Occupation: Actress
- Years active: 2015–present

Mahsa Hejazi (Persian: مهسا حجازی; born October 8, 1994) is an Iranian actress. She is best known for her roles as a deaf-mute woman in World War III (2022), and as Shirin Nejat in Tasian (2025). Hejazi earned two Hafez Award nominations for her performances in Viper of Tehran (2024) and Tasian.

== Early life ==
Mahsa Hejazi was born on October 8, 1994 in Tehran, Iran. She has two siblings, a brother and a sister. Hejazi studied in the Shahid Beheshti University of Tehran.

== Filmography ==
=== Film ===
| Year | Title | Role | Director | Notes | Ref(s) |
|---|---|---|---|---|---|
| 2016 | The Provisional Death of Bees | | Maryam Firouz | Short film | |
| 2017 | Asphyxia | Nurse | Fereydoun Jeyrani | | |
| 2018 | Pig | Tennis Club Girl | Mani Haghighi | | |
| 2019 | A Rainy Noon | Her | Ali Moazen | Short film | |
| 2021 | Far Away Portrait of a Woman | | Hossein Khami | Short film | |
| 2021 | Zalava | Khalaj's daughter | Arsalan Amiri | | |
| 2021 | Compensation | | Tahmineh Bahram | Short film | |
| 2022 | World War III | Ladan | Houman Seyyedi | | |
| 2023 | Hunchback | | Tahmineh Bahram | Short film | |

=== Web ===
| Year | Title | Role | Director | Platform | Notes | Ref(s) |
|---|---|---|---|---|---|---|
| 2024 | Viper of Tehran | Mona | Saman Moghaddam | Filmnet | Main role | |
| 2025 | Tasian | Shirin Nejat | Tina Pakravan | Filimo | Leading role | |

== Awards and nominations ==
Name of the award ceremony, year presented, category, nominee of the award, and the result of the nomination
| Award | Year | Category | Nominated Work | Result | Ref(s) |
|---|---|---|---|---|---|
| Hafez Awards | 2024 | Best Actress – Television Series Drama | Viper of Tehran | Nominated | |
| Hafez Awards | 2025 | Best Actress – Television Series Drama | Tasian | Nominated | |
| Iranian Short Film Association Awards | 2024 | Best Performance | Hunchback | Won | |
| Nahal International Short Film Festival | 2016 | Best Actress | The Provisional Death of Bees | Won | |
