= Babak Hamidian =

Iranian actor (born 1980)

- بابک حمیدیان
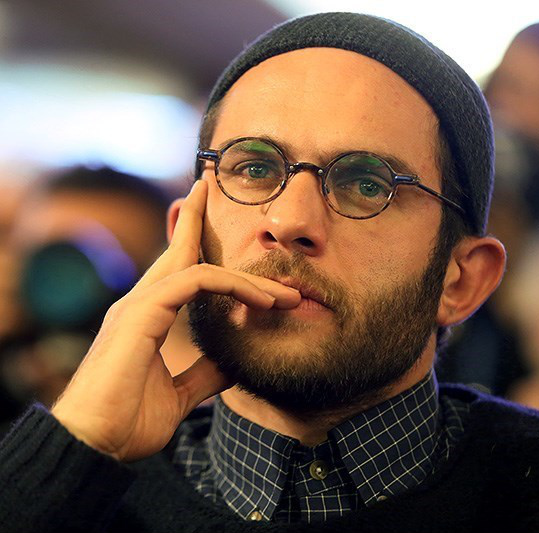
- Hamidian at the 2014 Fajr International Film Festival
- Born: September 10, 1980 (age 46); Rasht, Iran
- Years active: 2004–present
- Spouse: Mina Sadati

Babak Hamidian (Persian: بابک حمیدیان; born September 10, 1980) is an Iranian actor. He has received various accolades, including a Crystal Simorgh, a Hafez Award, an Iran Cinema Celebration Award and two Iran's Film Critics and Writers Association Awards.

== Early life ==
Babak Hamidian was born on September 9, 1980, in Tehran. He is a graduate of the Islamic Azad University, holding a degree in Theater with a specialization in Stage Design. Hamidian's passion for the arts, coupled with the support of his family, led him to pursue a degree in Theater, focusing on Stage Design. In 1999, he made his debut on the theater stage, marking his first acting experience. However, his initial foray into cinema occurred in 2003 with the film Qadamgah, directed by Mohammad Mehdi Asgarpour. The film garnered significant acclaim at the Fajr Film Festival, paving the way for Hamidian's more prominent presence in the cinematic landscape.

In the years that followed, Babak Hamidian established a robust presence in cinema, securing notable supporting roles in significant works such as Big Drum Under the Left Foot and Penniless. Big Drum Under the Left Foot, a film centered on the Iran-Iraq War, was directed by Kazem Masoumi in 2004. Hamidian's career trajectory continued to ascend, earning him critical acclaim for his performance in Hiss! Girls Don’t Scream, which led to a nomination for Best Supporting Actor at the 2013 Iran Cinema Critics Association Awards.

== Personal life ==
In mid-2015, Babak Hamidian married Iranian actress Mina Sadati.

== Filmography ==
=== Film ===
Year	Title	Role	Director	Notes	Ref(s)
2004	Big Drum Under Left Foot	Mehran	Kazem Masoumi		
2005	A Little Kiss		Bahman Farmanara		
2008	Three Women		Manijeh Hekmat		
2009	Penniless	Shahrokh	Hamid Nematollah		
2011	Absolutely Tame Is a Horse	Hamid	Abdolreza Kahani		
2012	A Respected Family	Arash	Masoud Bakhshi		
2012	Hatred	Hamed	Reza Dormishian		
2013	Hush! Girls Don't Scream	Morad	Pouran Derakhshandeh		
2014	Hussein Who Said No	Yazid I / Ubayd Allah ibn Ziyad	Ahmad Reza Darvish		
2014	Che	Asghar Vesali	Ebrahim Hatamikia		
2014	Tales	Babak	Rakhshan Banietemad		
2016	Bodyguard	Meysam Zarin	Ebrahim Hatamikia		
2017	Soheila No.17	Bahram	Mahmoud Ghaffari		
2018	Nostalgia Celebration	Kaveh	Pourya Azarbayjani		
2018	Cypress Underwater	Jahanbakhsh Keramat	Mohammad Ali Bashe Ahangar		
2018	Confiscation	Jalal Khavandi	Mehran Ahmadi		
2018	Damascus Time	Ali	Ebrahim Hatamikia		
2018	Rabbit	Arash	Mani Baghbani		
2018	The Role		Farnoosh Samadi	Short film	
2019	Reverse	Salar	Poulad Kimiai		
2019	My Second Year in College	Mansour	Rasoul Sadramali		
2019	A Hairy Tale	Shapour	Homayoun Ghanizadeh		
2020	The Day of the Riot	Emad	Behrouz Shoeibi		
2020	Bone Marrow	Hossein	Hamid Reza Ghorbani		
2020	Being and Time		Mani Baghbani	Unreleased film	
2023	Unknown	Mohammad Boroujerdi	Mohammad Hossein Latifi		
2024	The Old Bachelor		Oktay Baraheni	also as producer	
TBA	A Time in Eternity	Saeed	Mehdi Norouzian		

=== Web ===
Year	Title	Role	Director	Platform	Notes	Ref(s)
2017	The Excellency	Ramin Farazmand	Sam Gharibian	Video CD	Main role	
2021–2022	Once Upon a Time in Iran	Commissar Rajabof	Tina Pakravan	Namava	Supporting role	
2021	The Day of the Riot	Emad Badiee	Behrouz Shoeibi	Namava	Leading role; 3 episodes	
2023–present	Seven	Saber Langeroudi	Kiarash Asadizadeh	Tamashakhaneh	Main role	
2025	Azaazil	Mani Pashaee	Hassan Fathi	Namava	Main role	
2025	Tasian	Jamshid Nejat	Tina Pakravan	Filimo	Main role	
2026	Yal		Jamshid Mahmoudi	Filmnet	Main role	

=== Television ===
Year	Title	Role	Director	Network	Notes	Ref(s)
2007	Shahriar	Runaway	Kamal Tabrizi	IRIB TV2	Recurring role	
2014	Homeland	Abbas	Kamal Tabrizi	IRIB TV3	Season 3; banned in 2014, released in 2024	
2014	Curtain Dweller	Khazai	Behrouz Shoeibi	IRIB TV1	Supporting role	
2015	Transition from Suffering	Hamid	Fereidoun Hassanpour	IRIB TV1	Main role	
2016	Standardized Patient	Behnam	Saeed Aghakhani	IRIB TV1	Leading role; 14 episodes	
