= Tina Pakravan =

Iranian film director, writer, producer, and actress

- تینا پاکروان
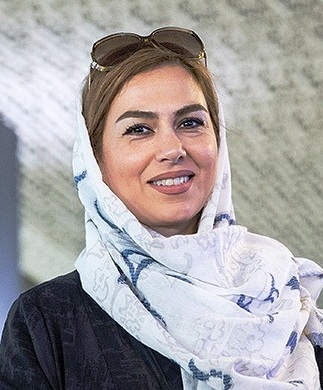
- Pakravan at the 37th Fajr International Film Festival, May 2019
- Born: 17 April 1977 (age 49); Tehran, Iran
- Occupations: Film director; screenwriter; film producer; actress
- Years active: 2000–present
- Notable work: It Happened at Midnight; Khanoom; Once Upon a Time in Iran
- Spouse: Ali Asadzadeh (m. 2018)

Tina Pakravan (Persian: تینا پاکروان; born 17 April 1977) is an Iranian film director, writer, producer, and actress.

== Career ==
Tina Pakravan was born in 1977 in Tehran. She did a B.A. in movie directing from Tehran Faculty of Cinema and Theater. Her cinematic career was begun with contributing to the magazine Gozāresh-e Film in 1995, followed by her contribution to such magazines as Abrār-e Sinamāyi (Persian: ابرار سینمایی), Sedā, Durbin, Harakat (صدا، دوربین، حرکت), and Fakur (فکور) weekly.

At the age of eighteen, Pakravan acted as the script girl of the movie Yās-hā-ye Vahshi (Persian: یاس‌های وحشی; The Wild Jasmines), directed by Mohsen Mohseninasab. In the movie Killing Mad Dogs (سگ‌کشی), directed by Bahram Bayzai, Pakravan was the director's assistant. In two TV series, Ta’tilāt-e Nowruzi (تعطیلات نوروزی; Nowruz Holidays), a production of IRIB TV2, and Rāz-e Sokut (راز سکوت; Silence’s Secret), she was the programmer as well as deputy production manager.

Pakravan went to the United States to continue with her education, where she majored in cinema at UCLA. There she made two short movies: Ro’yā (رؤیا; Dream), starring Behzad Farahani and Mozhgan Rabbani, and Actor Actor (اکتور اکتور). She also made the documentary Hamrāh bā Irāniān (همراه با ایرانیان; Accompanied by Iranians) for Jām-e Jam TV, which deals with the lives of Iranians in Los Angeles and San Francisco.

Back in Iran, Pakravan collaborated with Seyyed Zia’eddin Dorri in the production of the TV series Kolāh-e Pahlavi (The Pahlavi Hat; کلاه پهلوی) as the directing programmer and director's first assistant. She went on to collaborate with the director Dariush Mehrjoui as the production manager of the movie Santuri. She was also the production manager and programmer of the movies Vaghti Hame Khābim (وقتی همه خوابیم; When We Are All Asleep), directed by Bahram Bayzai, and Ekhrājihā 2 (اخراجی‌ها ۲; The Outcasts, Part 2), directed by Masoud Dehnamaki.

Pakravan's third short film was named Gereh (گره; Knot), starring Mohammad-Reza Sharifinia, Sara Khoeniha, Shaqayeq Farahani, and Mehrab Rezayi.

Pakravan's acting debut was the TV series Sāl-hā-ye Mashrouteh (سال‌های مشروطه; The Years of The Constitution), in which she was also the production manager, stage designer, and script consultant.

Teaching, writing books, translating, and writing critiques for the press, as well as holding photo exhibitions are among her other activities.

== Filmography ==
=== Film ===
Year	Title	Director	Writer	Producer	Actress	Make Up Artist
2019	Weightlessness	No	No	No	Yes	No
2017	Los Angeles Tehran	Yes	Yes	Yes	No	No
2017	Sara And Ayda	No	No	No	Yes	No
2017	House of Paper	No	No	No	Yes	No
2015	It Happened At Midnight	Yes	No	Yes	No	No
2015	Yahya Didn't Keep Quiet	No	No	Yes	No	No
2014	Metropole	No	No	No	Yes	No
2013	Khanoom	Yes	Yes	Yes	No	No
2005	Me And Debora	No	No	No	No	Yes

=== Home video ===
Year	Title	Director	Writer	Producer	Actress	Make Up Artist
2021	Once Upon a Time in Iran	Yes	Yes	No	No	No
2025	Tasian	Yes	Yes	No	No	No

=== Short film ===
Year	Title	Director	Writer	Producer	Actress	Make Up Artist
2010	This Was My City	Yes	Yes	No	No	No
2009	Knot	Yes	Yes	No	No	No
2007	Actor Actor	Yes	No	No	No	No
2000	Dream	Yes	No	No	No	No
?	Miracle	No	Yes	No	No	No

=== Television film ===
Year	Title	Director	Writer	Producer	Actress	Make Up Artist
2012	The B Story	No	No	Yes	No	No
2011	Paradise Traveler	No	No	Yes	Yes	No
2011	Bridge	Yes	No	No	No	No

=== Television series ===
Year	Title	Director	Writer	Producer	Actress	Make Up Artist
2009–2010	The Years of The Constitution	No	No	No	Yes	No
