= Filimo =

Iranian video-on-demand streaming service

- Filimo logo
- Native name: فیلیمو
- Company type: Private
- Website type: Video-on-demand
- Available in: Persian, English
- Headquarters: Tehran, Iran
- Country of origin: Iran
- Revenue: ▲730.5 billion Toman(2022)
- Parent: Saba idea
- Website: https://www.filimo.com
- Registration: Required
- Users: ▲1,080,000 (As of 2022)
- Launched: January 2015
- Current status: Active

Filimo (Persian: فیلیمو) is an Iranian video-on-demand streaming service, owned and operated by Saba idea. Filimo offers a wide variety of films, television series, documentaries, and other video content internationally. The platform is widely used within Iran and holds a market share of over 50% in the Iranian streaming industry. It has more than 400,000 monthly subscribers, with users watching over 450 million minutes of video content per month.

== History ==
Filimo began its service in February 2015 under the name "Filimo Aparat", as part of the broader development of the Aparat video-sharing platform. After a short period, the service was rebranded to Filimo. The first version of the Filimo app was released in June 2015 for Android users. By March 2015, Filimo had reached a significant milestone with over one million video views.

In 2016, Filimo achieved significant growth, surpassing 1 billion minutes of video content viewed and experiencing a 445% increase in content consumption. Additionally, the platform saw a 581% rise in its user base that year. In 2016, Filimo introduced an exclusive version of its app for Android TV, further enhancing its accessibility. By August 2017, Filimo began offering 24/7 customer service to address user inquiries and technical issues. In August 2019, Filimo launched a hardware product called "Filimo Box", allowing users to stream Filimo content on their televisions with 4K resolution.

== Products ==
=== Filimo Box ===
In August 2019, Sabaidea launched the "Filimo Box", a hardware device designed to enhance users' streaming experience. This Android-based box features 2 GB of DDR4 RAM and 16 GB of internal storage. The device allows users to stream Filimo content on their TVs in 4K resolution, offering a more immersive viewing experience.

=== Free Content Offers ===
On special occasions such as holidays, Filimo offers some of its content for free, which is typically behind a subscription paywall. For instance, the platform provided free access to some content during the Iranian New Year (Nowruz) and the Islamic holy month of Ramadan in 2021.

== Televika ==
Filimo launched Televika, a streaming service designed for audiences outside Iran, offering films and television series from Western Asia. The platform provides a collection of content that reflects the region's diverse cultures, histories, and contemporary stories, accessible with subtitles in English, Kurdish, and Arabic. Televika features a range of genres, including historical dramas, modern narratives, documentaries, and family-oriented entertainment. While it emphasizes works by creators from Western Asia, the platform's content can resonate with anyone seeking distinctive storytelling and fresh perspectives from a different cultural context.

Televika is aimed at the international market, offering access to users worldwide. The service supports various international payment methods, allowing viewers from different countries to subscribe. This broadens the platform's reach and makes it an accessible option for a global audience interested in exploring Western Asian cinema and television. By presenting lesser-seen narratives, Televika offers to explore the artistic and social dimensions of Western Asia.

== See also ==
- Aparat
- Rubika
- VOD
