= Pardis Ahmadieh =

Iranian actress (born 1992)

- پردیس احمدیه
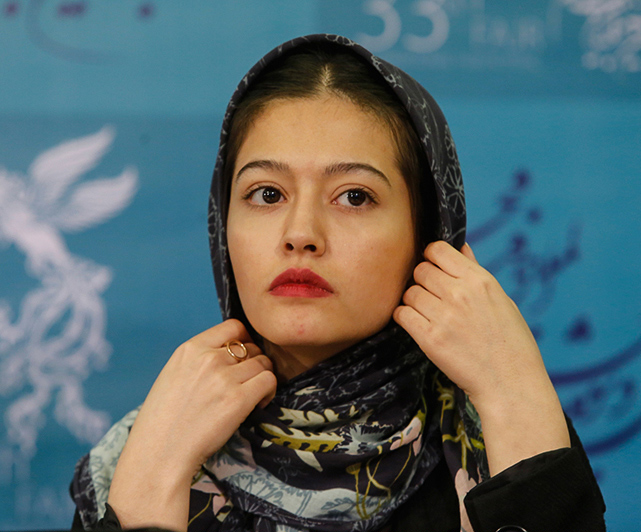
- Ahmadieh at the 2015 Fajr International Film Festival
- Born: June 29, 1992 (age 34); Maragheh, East Azerbaijan, Iran
- Occupation: Actress
- Years active: 2006–present

Pardis Ahmadieh (Persian: پردیس احمدیه; born June 29, 1992) is an Iranian actress. She is best known for her performances in Red Nail Polish (2016) and The Lion Skin (2022–2023). She has received various accolades, including a Hafez Award and an Urban International Film Festival Award, in addition to nomination for an Iran Cinema Celebration Award.

== Career ==
=== 2007–2015: Career beginnings ===
In the age of 15, she was introduced to Afshin Sadeghi by director Hamid Nematollah for her role in the film Imitator of The Devil (2007).

Later in 2010, she starred in two films Butterflies and Broken.

She played as Fereshteh in the 2011 drama series The Recall.

From 2012 to 2015 she starred in three films and a short film, Hiding in the Open (Short film, 2012), Actors Studio (2013), Hail and Sun, and The Girl's House (both 2015).

=== 2016: First lead role ===
She got her first lead role in Seyyed Jamal Seyyed Hatami's Red Nail Polish (2016) where she was chosen from 500 actresses who auditioned for the role.

For her performance in the film, she gained attention and received critical acclaim, winning Best Actress award at the Urban International Film Festival, in addition to nominations for a Hafez Award and an Iran Cinema Celebration award.

=== 2017–2019: Major roles ===
She acted alongside Navid Mohammadzadeh and Elnaz Shakerdoost in Fereydoun Jeyrani's Asphyxia (2017), earning her second Hafez Award nomination.

In 2019, she starred alongside Baran Kosari, Sara Bahrami and Jamshid Hashempour in the drama film Repression.

In September 2019, she joined the cast of the film A minor directed by Dariush Mehrjoui. The film premiered in 2022.

=== 2020–present: Wide recognition ===
In 2020 she starred in Tooman directed by Morteza Farshbaf and received critical acclaim and Best Actress award at the 21st Hafez Awards.

Later she played as Golbahar, a sixteen-year-old homeless girl who has been producing and selling babies since she was 11 years old in Reza Dormishian's No Choice (2020). The film screened for the first time at the 33rd Tokyo International Film Festival.

She acted in the episode five of the 2021 horror drama series Them alongside Mojtaba Pirzadeh her frequent partner.

On September 3, 2021, it was announced that Ahmadieh will star in the fantasy drama series Lily's Turn as Lily directed by Rouhollah Hejazi.

On June 10, 2022, it was announced that Ahmadieh will star as Sahel in the crime drama series The Lion Skin alongside Shahab Hosseini, Hadi Hejazifar and Pantea Bahram directed by Jamshid Mahmoudi.

== Filmography ==
=== Film ===
Year	Title	Role	Director	Notes
2007	Imitator of the Devil	Maryam	Afshin Sadeghi	
2012	Hiding in the Open	Raha	Tina Ghazimorad	Short film
2013	Actors Studio	Niki	Alireza Davood Nejad	
2015	Hail and Sun	Goli	Reza Karimi	
2015	The Girl's House	Setareh	Sharam Shah Hosseini	
2016	Red Nail Polish	Akram	Seyyed Jamal Seyyed-Hatami	
2017	Asphyxia	Nasim Sazgar	Fereydoun Jeyrani	
2017	I Want to Dance	Patient	Bahman Farmanara	Cameo
2019	Repression	Parvaneh	Reza Gouran	
2020	Tooman	Aylin	Morteza Farshbaf	
2020	No Choice	Golbahar Rezvani	Reza Dormishian	
2022	A Minor	Nadi	Dariush Mehrjui	
2024	Two Days Later	Maryam	Asghar Naimi	
2024	Pool & Party	Donya	Saeed Soheili	

=== Web ===
Year	Title	Role	Director	Platform	Notes
2021	Mutual Friendship	Herself	Shahab Hosseini	Namava	Talk show; 1 episode
2021	Them	Baran	Mehdi Aghajani	Filmnet	Leading role; Episode 5: "Everything's Over"
2022	Lily's Turn	Lily Etehad	Rouhollah Hejazi	Namava	Leading role; 23 episodes
2022–2023	The Lion Skin	Sahel Molaee	Jamshid Mahmoudi	Filmnet	Main role; 24 episodes
2026	Yal	Pari	Jamshid Mahmoudi	Filmnet	Main role

=== Television ===
Year	Title	Role	Director	Network	Notes
2010	Butterflies	Sahar	Naser Rafaei	Jame Jam TV	Television film
2010	Broken		Hojat Ghasemzadeh Asl		Television film
2011	The Recall	Fereshteh	Hojat Ghasemzadeh Asl	iFilm	Recurring role
2021	Get Together	Herself	Mehran Modiri	IRIB Nasim	Talk show; 1 episode

== Awards and nominations ==
Name of the award ceremony, year presented, category, nominee of the award, and the result of the nomination
Award	Year	Category	Nominated Work	Result	Ref(s)
Hafez Awards	2017	Best Actress – Motion Picture	Red Nail Polish	Nominated	
Hafez Awards	2018	Best Actress – Motion Picture	Asphyxia	Nominated	
Hafez Awards	2021	Best Actress – Motion Picture	Tooman	Won	
Hafez Awards	2023	Best Actress – Television Series Drama	The Lion Skin	Nominated	
Iran Cinema Celebration	2017	Best Actress in a Leading Role	Red Nail Polish	Nominated	
Urban International Film Festival	2017	Best Actress	Red Nail Polish	Won	
