= Capital (Iranian TV series) =

Iranian comedy TV series

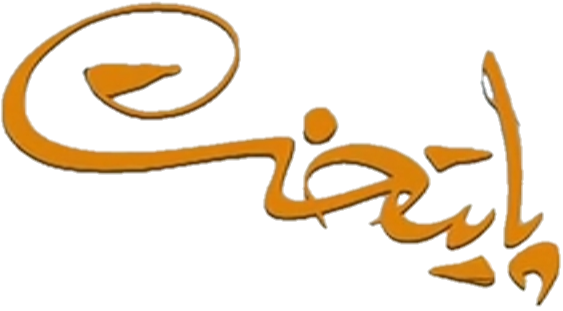
- The series logo
- Genre: Comedy; Social; Family
- Written by: Mohsen Tanabandeh; Khashayar Alvand; Hassan Varasteh; Amirhosein Ghassemi
- Directed by: Siroos Moghaddam
- Starring: Mohsen Tanabandeh; Rima Raminfar; Ahmad Mehranfar; Alireza Khamseh; Mehran Ahmadi; Sara Forghaniasl; Nika Forghaniasl; Pedram Faizi; Hooman Haji Abdollahi; Nasrin Nosrati; Bahram Afshari
- Music by: Arya Aziminejad
- Country of origin: Iran
- Original language: Persian
- No. of seasons: 7
- No. of episodes: 122

Production
- Producer: Elham Ghafouri
- Running time: 40–90 minutes
- Production company: IRIB Owj (season 5)

Original release
- Network: IRIB TV1
- Release: 21 March 2011 – 17 April 2025

Paytakht (Persian: پایتخت, lit. 'Capital') is an Iranian TV series directed by Siroos Moghaddam and produced by Elham Ghafouri. portraying the life of a Mazandarani family in Aliabad village.

The series ran for seven seasons and one hundred twenty-two episodes over the course of fourteen years (2011–2025) premiering during each Nowruz, the Persian New Year, with the exception of Paytakht 4 that began in the Ramazan of 2015. The comedy series is directed by Siroos Moghaddam, and Mohsen Tanabandeh is the creator and the main actor of this series. His appearance is completed with a mustache and curly hair‌. Naghi is known for his strong sense of honor and his dedication to family. Picture World magazine has recognized the role of Naghi Mamouli as one of the top 100 enduring roles in the history of Iranian cinema and television.

== Plot ==
=== Paytakht Season 1 (2011) ===
A rural family from Aliabad village in Mazandaran province are planning to move to Tehran, the capital city of Iran. After arriving, they find the landlord of the home laying dead in his bed. The legal problems of inheriting the landlord's properties make Naghi Mamouli (Mohsen Tanabandeh) and his family unable to settle at their new home. According to high expenses in Tehran, they run out of the money very soon, so they decided to live in Arastou's truck which carries all their furniture and belongings. During this time, they get involved in various adventures. Shortly after settling into their new home in Tehran they find out that their house will be demolished to make a new road. The family figures out that Tehran is not a suitable place for them to live so they decide to return to Aliabad village.

=== Paytakht Season 2 (2013) ===
Naghi receives an assignment from his boss to transport a newly made minaret to Qeshm Island in the south of Iran, to build a mosque overthere. He convinces his family to join him and Arastou (Ahmad Mehranfar) in this journey and travel to the south of Iran with Arastou's truck. But a young woman named Miss Fadavi (Linda Kiani), who is an acquaintance of Naghi's boss, joins them in the very last moments and makes lots of drama. Arastou falls in love with her and causes many awkward but funny moments during this journey...

=== Paytakht Season 3 (2014) ===
Arastou 'falls in love' with a young girl by the name of Miss Tehrani. He wants to hold his wedding at Naghi's home but the home is still under construction. Naghi lets him hold the wedding there anyway, and ignores his worker Mousa's request to build a pillar underneath the house to prevent it collapsing. On the night of the wedding, disaster strikes and the house collapses during the celebrations. Many people are injured and this ends Arastou's short lived marriage. These series of events result in Naghi losing his job and falling into depression. Naghi and Mousa (who broke both his arms in the accident) were forced to live in the home of his sister, Fahimeh. To give him a boost, Naghi decides to enter a national tournament in wrestling, his greatest passion. He loses badly to an elderly man by the name of Sohanpaz, causing his depression to become worse and becomes the laughingstock of Mazandaran.

During Naghi's cycle of depression, his cousin Arastou reveals to the family that he is engaged to a Chinese woman by the name of Cho Chung, or Raheleh after she converted to Islam. This centers the story around her, and how she travels all the way to Tehran in order to surprise Arastou, causing many troubles along the way. Although they have an argument after Arastou failed to tell her about his previous marriage, they are madly in love and plan to hold their wedding in Turkey.

It is revealed that due to Sohanpaz becoming injured, Naghi is now the new contender for the international wrestling championship, to be held in Tehran in a matter of days. He rushes to the stadium to train and finds out he has to lose around 7 kilograms in order to compete in his weight class. Naghi shows determination that had not been seen from him in months. He loses the weight thanks to a very strict diet from his coach and qualifies for the tournament. Thanks to help of his family and friends, Naghi wins the championship finals, beating the United States, Russia, and China for 1st place and 10000 dollars.

=== Paytakht Season 4 (2015) ===
The Mamouli family face a new set of challenges after Arastou's wife Cho Chung dies in the MH370 plane crash. The season is set one year after the crash, however Arastou is still devastated and continues to mourn her death. Over the year, Arastou has grown out his beard and hair in mourning, alongside wearing black clothes. Naghi has done the same in support of his cousin. However, Naghi becomes tired of his appearance and urges Arastou to end his mourning, trim his beard, and begin to wear his colorful clothes once again.

Meanwhile, Naghi's wife Homa Sahadat becomes a city council member of Aliabad after winning a landslide election. Although Naghi is proud of her, he fears her work life may start to distance her from the family. He begins to despise the city council after Homa begins monitoring his behavior in order to prevent him from embarrassing her with his antics. Homa's position in the city council becomes a huge problem when Naghi begins to plan the construction of his sister Fahimeh's new home. After Naghi and Homa realize the new home is positioned in an illegal territory, they become opposed to each other. Naghi defies the law and continues to build the house for his sister, while Homa implores to them to stop construction as the home will soon be demolished by the city council. Many friends and family help to build the house over the course of many episodes.

Arastou is informed by the police that Malaysia Airlines will be paying a sum of $400,000 to him for the death of his wife. When he goes home, he tells no-one and is unhappy from the notion of profiting from the death of his wife. However, the news spreads quickly to Naghi, who is disappointed by the fact that he found out from his friend Rahmat rather than Arastou himself. Although Naghi is not interested in the money, he feels betrayed by Arastou since he was never told by him, causing small commotion.

After all the controversy of Fahimeh's house, the city council finally finds out and sends a bulldozer to the house to demolish it. After much commotion with government officials, police, and a crowd of residents, Naghi pours gasoline on himself and points a lighter to himself, threatening to set himself on fire if his family is not left alone. This causes Homa to collapse and suffer a heart attack from the shock. Naghi drops everything and accompanies Homa to the hospital, where the fate of the house is left uncertain. The gasoline is revealed to be only water. Naghi and Homa make up and decide to go on a trip to Mashhad with the family, to the excitement of Baba Panjali.

=== Paytakht Season 5 (2018) ===
After Behboud Fariba, Fahimeh's Husband, had been missing in Africa for a long period of time during his trip, he is considered dead. his son Behtash returns from military service and starts appearing, however it upsets him when he sees Rahmat flirting with his mother Fahimeh.

The Mamouli family is in a car crash with Arastou, this upsets Naghi and separates Naghi and Arastou for a period of time. During the family's trip to Turkey, they get in an accident while in a balloon ride and are left stranded in Syria. together with the help of another Syrian family and a former ISIS conscript Elizabeth, they try to find their way out of the ISIS zone.

=== Paytakht Season 6 (2020–2021) ===
Several months have passed. Panjali has recently died due to dyspnea during a meal, and all of his organs are donated. Naghi retires wrestling from FILA and becomes a private driver of Mr. Maleki – the city's parliamentary representative. Homa has been accepted as an anchorwoman on IRIB Mazandaran. Behtash is the 4th goalkeeper of Nassaji FC. He has wore a rugby hat, similar to Petr Čech, due to a similar injury. Behboud returns from Somalia with Alien Hand Syndrome. Arastoo has been released after a nearly 1-year imprisonment, he starts working for a dealer after he would threat Arastoo he would tell the police if he does not follow his order. Behtash receives an offer from Panathinaikos F. C for a large sum of money, Although he does not tell anyone. After a year of the COVID-19 pandemic, major drama is brought upon the family, Homa father passes from Coronavirus from Naghi which could lead to imprisonment for him. Rahmat is married with triplets, Arastoo is under house-arrest, and Behdasht is injured making him take time off sports, this leads to lots of financial issues for the family.

=== Paytakht Season 7 (2025) ===
The seventh season starts with Homa talking to a therapist. She explains that Naghi and her twin daughters, Sara and Nika, have become a flight attendant and a college student, respectively. She also explains that they have adopted a young son named Salar to help ease the family's loneliness. She then says that Naghi now runs a wrestling school but has hearing loss and has to use a hearing aid.

Arastoo has also acquired an RV, which he lives in. Arastoo tells Naghi that he has found a new fiancée named Sharzad, who prefers to be known as "Sheri" and is also on an expedition mission to Mars. Naghi criticizes him for not having a proper house and argues that, because Sheri will soon leave for Mars, there is no reason for marriage, but Arastoo remains arrogant.

Sara is also revealed to be dating a Tajik boy named Dolat, who is a member of a wealthy family and will provide the money for the marriage. However, he is insistent that the marriage take place in Tajikistan, which the family dislikes and is reluctant to accept. Later, Fahimeh goes in search of her missing son, Behtash, who has not been seen for some time. Naghi, Fahimeh, Homa, and Behrouz, Fahimeh's younger son, ask Rahmat's twin brothers at their car wash, where they reveal Behtash's location.

After going to Behtash's apartment, they find him ill and addicted to drugs. Behtash explains that a laboratory vehicle crashed, and he adopted a monkey that had been in the vehicle. The monkey, which was ill, bit Behtash, causing him to exhibit monkey-like behavior.

== Production ==
=== Naming ===
Moghadam, referring to the reason for naming this series "Paytakht" (Capital) and the way the story continues, said:

Due to the fact that our family moves from another city to Tehran, the capital of Iran, and face a series of problems, the series was named "Capital" and this name has remained, even in the fourth season, which may not be set in Tehran, but people still know this series as "Capital".

=== Writers ===
Tanabandeh was the designer and supervisor of authors of the series and wrote the script of each season of the series with the cooperation of one or more authors.

- Paytakht 1: Khashayar Alvand and Amir Hossein Ghasemi
- Paytakht 2: Hasan Varesteh and Kourosh Narimani
- Paytakht 3: Khashayar Alvand and Hasan Varesteh
- Paytakht 4: Khashayar Alvand and Hasan Varesteh
- Paytakht 5: Khashayar Alvand and Amir Hossein Ghasemi
- Paytakht 6: Arash Abbasi and Mohammad Tanabandeh

=== Filming locations ===
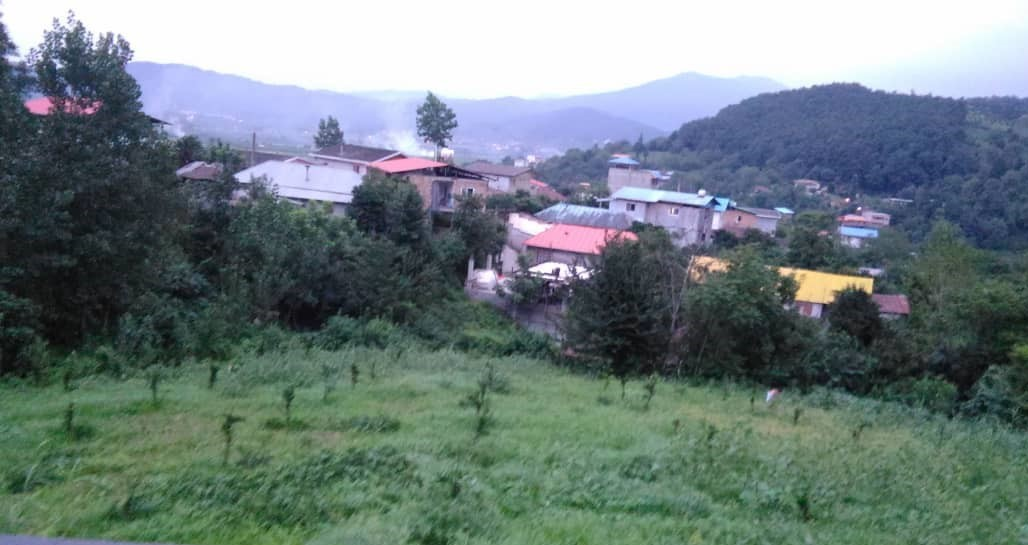
A picture of Shirgah

The series has been mostly filmed in shirgah. Tehran, Sari and Qaem Shahr are other places where the series was filmed. Also an episode from fifth season was filmed in Adana, Turkey. Also Syria episodes from fifth season was filmed in Holy defense town.

== Broadcast ==
First season of Paytakht aired in Nowruz 2011 on IRIB TV1, second season aired in Nowruz 2013. Third season aired in Nowruz 2014, fourth season aired in Ramadan 2015, fifth season aired in Nowruz 2018 and sixth season aired in 2020 Nowruz. The broadcast of the final episodes of Paytakht 6 was delayed due to the COVID-19 pandemic in Iran and it was aired in March 2020. Additionally, the series has been repeatedly re-aired on other IRIB channels.

== Cast ==
=== Main ===
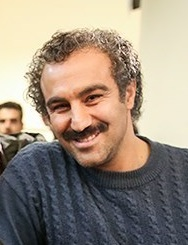
Naghi Ma'mouli

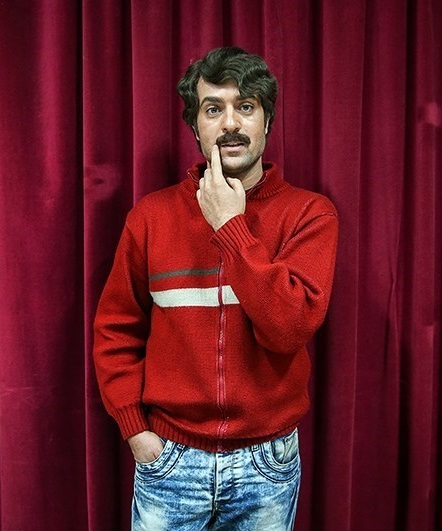
Arastou Amel

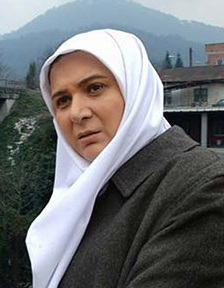
Homa Sa'adat

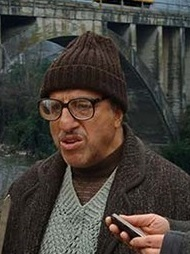
Panj'ali Mamouli

- Mohsen Tanabandeh as Naghi Mamouli
- Rima Raminfar as Homa Saadat, Naghi's wife
- Ahmad Mehranfar as Arastou Amel, Naghi's cousin
- Alireza Khamseh as Baba Panjali, Naghi's father (S1-5)
- Sara & Nika Forghani as Sara & Nika Mamouli, Naghi's twin daughters (S1-6)
- Sana & Sonia Hoseyni as Sara & Nika Mamouli, Naghi's twin daughters (7)
- Nasrin Nosrati as Fahimeh, Naghi's sister (S2-)
- Bahram Afshari as Behtash Fariba, Naghi's nephew, son of Fahimeh (S5-)/ Shirafkan, Behboud brother(S2)
- Hooman Haji-Abdollahi as Rahmatollah Amini-e shalikar-e hezarjaribi, a friend of Naghi and Arastou (S2-)
- Mehran Ahmadi as Behboud Fariba, Fahimeh's husband (S2-3, S6)
- Mostafa & Mojtaba BalalHabashi as Rahman & Rahim, Rahmat's twin brothers (S3-)
- Salman Khatti as Taghi, Naghi's brother (S2-)
- Abolfazl Rajabi as Behrouz, Behboud's son. (S6)
- Ali Amin-Hasani as Behrouz, Behboud's son. (S7)

=== Recurring ===
- Samira Hassanpour as Golrokh (S1)
- Pouria Poursorkh as Masoud Kabiri (S1)
- Pejman Bazeghi as Police officer (S1)
- Linda Kiani as Miss Fadavi (S2)
- Amir Jafari as himself (S2)
- Javad Khiabani as himself (S3, S6)
- Hedayat Hashemi as Mousa, the plaster worker (S3-4, S7)
- Meng Han Zhang as Chu (Raheleh) Chang (S3)
- Mohammad Reza Alimardani as Abdulfattah Baou, Homa's rival in council elections
- Mahya Dehghani as Soosan, Mousa's daughter (S4)
- Niloofar Rajaeifar as Elizabeth, an ex-ISIS maiden (S5)
- Amir Seyedzadeh as Mr. Maleki, the parliamentary representative (S6)
- Atieh Javid as Jamileh, Taghi's wife (S6-7)
- Majid Vasheghani as Siamak (S1)
- Alireza Haghighi as himself (S6)
- Behnam Bani as himself (S6)
- Pedram Faizi in the role of Little Ali

== Characters ==
- Naghi Mamouli with playing Mohsen Tanabandeh is the main character name of the series. Tanabandeh has expressed that he portrayed the character of Naghi by drawing from his own nature and the personality of his cousin. He also said that his aunt family are from Bandar-e Gaz, Golestan and he was familiar with the culture and dialect of Mazanderani people. especially Golestani people. His appearance is completed with a mustache and curly hair. Naghi is known for his strong sense of honor and his dedication to family. Picture World magazine has recognized the role of Naghi Mamouli as one of the top 100 enduring roles in the history of Iranian cinema and television.Naghi is known for his strong sense of honor and his dedication to family. The magazine "Donyaye Tasvir" has recognized Naghi's ordinary role as one of the top 100 enduring roles in the history of Iranian cinema and television.

== Awards ==
- Paytakht 1: Best television series of 2005–2017 IRIB TV1 – The poll Sin Mesle Serial
  Best Comedy Series in Jaam-e Jam TV Festival
- Paytakht 2: Best television series in Nowrouz – The poll Soroush Publishing Company
- Paytakht 3: Best Screenplay & Best Director & Best Actor Award – IRIB Launched in 2014
  Attractive series The poll Hamshahri Newspaper with 86% vote
- Paytakht 4: Best television series in Ramadan – The poll Soroush Magazine with 201 points
  Best Actor & Best Actress in a Comedy – The 16th Hafez Awards
- Paytakht 5: Best Screenplay from Hafez Awards Best television series Hafez Awards Best television series in Nowrouz
- Paytakht 6: Winner of the statuette of the best male comedian (Mohsen Tanabandeh) from the twentieth celebration of Picture World (Hafez Awards)

== Reception ==
=== Positive reactions ===
This series has been accompanied by a positive reaction from the audience and has been able to gain many fans. But, it has been criticized by some critics. Also, due to the death of the influential writer in the series (Khashayar Alvand), he was not present in the sixth season and the season received about its script.

=== Negative reactions ===
Ahmad Ali Moghimi, in a letter addressed to Zarghami, expressing his strong protest against the "Capital 3" series and the elites of Mazandaran, said: "Capital 3" series has done the most ridiculous thing possible to make the audience laugh and is trying to make its audience laugh by mocking the zealous people of Mazandaran.

=== Censored ===
There were censorships in this series, which were protested by the writers and actors of the series. The height of censorship was in the fifth and sixth season.

Amir Hosein Ghassemi the writer of fifth season of Paytath protested against censorship:

I am really sorry for my filmmaker crew & myself, that all we are doing is to make the audience happy and put a smile on the faces of our sad people, while the heads of Iranian television betrayed their moral obligations to preserve their position!

Mohsen Tanabandeh after censorship of sixth season said:

There is the same difference between earth and sky between our Paytakht and the Paytakht you see.

== Sources ==
- Stage adaptation of "Paytakht" to tour Canada U.S. and Europe
