= Blindness (TV series) =

2026 Iranian crime mystery television series

- کوری
- Genre: Crime; Mystery
- Written by: Amir Abili
- Directed by: Sajjad Pahlavanzadeh
- Starring: Merila Zarei; Amir Jafari; Sara Bahrami; Mohsen Ghassabian; Amir Norouzi; Abbas Jamshidifar
- Composer: Hesam Naseri
- Country of origin: Iran
- Original language: Persian
- No. of seasons: 1
- No. of episodes: 12

Production
- Producer: Kazem Daneshi
- Cinematography: Saeed Barati
- Editors: Khashayar Movahedian; Elaheh Izadi
- Production company: Filmnet

Original release
- Network: Filmnet
- Release: 11 July 2026

Blindness (Persian: کوری, romanized: Kouri) is an Iranian crime and mystery television series directed by Sajjad Pahlavanzadeh, written by Amir Abili, and produced by Kazem Daneshi. The series stars Marila Zarei, Amir Jafari, Sara Bahrami, Mohsen Ghassabian, Amir Norouzi, and Abbas Jamshidifar.

The series premiered in Iran on 11 July 2026 and is distributed through Filmnet and Namava.

== Plot ==
The series begins with a deadly incident at a wedding celebration involving adulterated alcoholic beverages. Several people are affected, with some becoming blind and others dying. The investigation takes a more complicated turn when one of the victims is revealed to be the child of an influential person. The resulting case brings questions of justice, power and concealed relationships to the center of the story.

The story was described by Iranian media as a crime drama inspired by a judicial case and dealing with a social issue involving contaminated alcoholic beverages.

== Cast ==
- Marila Zarei as Sheyda
- Amir Jafari as Younes
- Sara Bahrami as Hana
- Abbas Jamshidifar as Shabani
- Mohsen Ghassabian as Shams
- Amir Norouzi as Behzad
- Majid Norouzi as Shahab
- Hadis Mir-Amini as Shamim
- Setayesh Dehghan as Ava
- Vahid Montazeri as Meysam
- Maryam Kaviani as Farideh
- Mohammad Ashkanfar as Solgi
- Sahar Lotfi as Maral
- Ghazaleh Akrami as Reyhaneh
- Shahram Ghaedi as Amir
- Pouya Noroozi as Farbod
- Parviz Fallahipour as Haj Rahim
- Yasna Mirtahmasb as Navid
- Seyyed Ali Salehi as Abbas
- Erfan Naseri as Mohsen

== Production ==
Blindness was directed by Sajjad Pahlavanzadeh, written by Amir Abili, and produced by Kazem Daneshi. The series was produced for Filmnet, with Marila Zare'i among the first cast members publicly announced for the project.

The production was covered by Iranian media before its release. Reports identified the series as a crime drama and described its subject as a socially sensitive issue.

Filmnet's credits list Hesam Naseri as composer, Saeed Barati as cinematographer, and Khashayar Movahedian and Elaheh Izadi as editors.

== Release ==
The series was initially scheduled to premiere on 19 June 2026, with episodes planned for weekly release on Fridays at noon. The release was subsequently postponed.

The first episode was eventually released on 11 July 2026 at 8 p.m. in Iran. Subsequent episodes were scheduled for weekly release on Fridays at noon.

The delay was reported by several Iranian news organizations. ISNA reported that the series had encountered obstacles to its release, while other outlets reported on the postponement before its eventual premiere.

== Reception ==
Blindness received coverage from Iranian news organizations and film publications following its premiere. Reviews discussed the series' crime and mystery elements, its treatment of a social issue, and its narrative and directorial approach.

IRNA described the series as a crime drama inspired by a judicial case and centered on a social problem. Its coverage highlighted the incident involving adulterated alcohol as the starting point of the story and discussed the series' transition from a domestic setting into a criminal and social narrative.

Fararu's review of the first episode described the series as being inspired by a real criminal case and examined its portrayal of a tragedy involving contaminated alcoholic beverages. The review also discussed the series' atmosphere and narrative approach.

Other reviews were more critical of the series' narrative structure and direction. A review published by Shahraranews described the early episodes as relying on familiar narrative conventions and discussed criticisms of the direction, mise-en-scène and storytelling structure.

The series also received positive attention from some publications for its depiction of a social tragedy and its crime-thriller atmosphere.
