= Yal (TV series) =

2026 Iranian crime drama television series

- Persian: یَل
- Genre: Drama; Mystery; Crime
- Written by: Jamshid Mahmoudi; Reza Baharvand
- Directed by: Jamshid Mahmoudi
- Starring: Navid Mohammadzadeh; Milad Keymaram; Babak Hamidian; Pardis Ahmadieh; Neda Jebraeili; Mahbod Jahan-Noosh; Hossein Yari; Mojtaba Pirzadeh; Mohsen Ghasabian; Roya Javidnia; Soheyla Razavi; Ali Osivand; Mehdi Nosrati; Peyman Moghaddami; Poolad Mokhtari; Meysam Mojaveri; Sina Ghasemi; Mohammad Ashkanfar; Morteza Khanjani; Hossein Samari; Faezeh Yousefi; Hadi Elyasi; Marjan Ghamari; Mohammad Aghebati; Arshida Dorostkar; Tasnim Hosseini
- Composer: Bamdad Afshar
- Country of origin: Iran
- Original language: Persian
- No. of episodes: 6

Production
- Producer: Navid Mahmoudi
- Cinematography: Mohammad Rasouli
- Editor: Sara Ahani

Original release
- Network: Filmnet
- Release: 9 October 2026

Yal (Persian: یَل, romanized: Yal) is an Iranian crime drama television series written by Jamshid Mahmoudi and Reza Baharvand, directed by Jamshid Mahmoudi, and produced by Navid Mahmoudi for Filmnet. It stars Navid Mohammadzadeh, Milad Keymaram, Hossein Yari, Pardis Ahmadieh, Neda Jebraeili, Mojtaba Pirzadeh, Mohsen Ghasabian, and Babak Hamidian.

== Plot ==
Set in a village in the 1970s, the series follows a series of murders targeting young women. As the killings continue, the villagers become entangled in an increasingly complex mystery, while a detective arrives in the village to uncover the truth.

== Cast ==
- Navid Mohammadzadeh as Malek, a detective
- Milad Keymaram as Sohrab, the brother of Morteza and Pari, and Leila's uncle
- Pardis Ahmadieh as Pari, Sohrab and Morteza's sister and Leila's mother
- Babak Hamidian as Saeed, a friend of Sohrab and Jamshid
- Neda Jebraeili as Shahla, a friend of Pari
- Mahbod Jahan-Noosh as Morteza, Sohrab and Pari's brother and Leila's uncle
- Hossein Yari as Mohsen, a friend of Sohrab
- Mojtaba Pirzadeh as Jamshid Zomorod, a friend of Sohrab and Saeed
- Mohsen Ghasabian
- Roya Javidnia
- Soheyla Razavi
- Ali Osivand as Samavat, a gendarme in the village
- Mehdi Nosrati
- Peyman Moghaddami
- Poolad Mokhtari
- Meysam Mojaveri
- Sina Ghasemi
- Mohammad Ashkanfar
- Morteza Khanjani
- Hossein Samari
- Faezeh Yousefi
- Hadi Elyasi
- Marjan Ghamari
- Mohammad Aghebati
- Arshida Dorostkar as Ghazal, Mohsen's daughter
- Tasnif Hosseini as Leila, Pari's daughter and Sohrab and Morteza's niece

== Release ==
Filmnet announced that Yal would be released on the platform on 9 October 2026.

Following the release of the series' sixth episode, the Fars News Agency criticized a scene depicting a child embracing their mother, which was described as the first such scene to be portrayed in an Iranian television series. The agency characterized the scene as a violation of social norms and a crossing of red lines. The Tasnim News Agency also criticized scenes depicting alcohol consumption and the controversial embrace between the mother and child, calling for action to be taken against the series. Ultimately, following a judicial order issued by the Tehran District 35 Prosecutor's Office, the series was suspended on the grounds that it had published content deemed criminal and contrary to public decency and morality. Its release was halted until further notice.

== Production ==
=== Development ===
Following the success of The Lion Skin, brothers Jamshid Mahmoudi and Navid Mahmoudi began developing a new series for Filmnet. Early reports described Yal as a spin-off of The Lion Skin, with a story centered on the character Reza Parvaneh. However, Jamshid Mahmoudi later denied that the series was a spin-off or continuation of the earlier series, and subsequent reports described Yal as an independent story set during the Pahlavi era.

=== Casting ===
The series initially announced Amir Jadidi, Alireza Kamali, and Tanaz Tabatabaei among its cast. Jadidi later left the project, while Kamali and Tabatabaei also departed during the development process. Milad Keymaram and Pardis Ahmadieh subsequently joined the cast, replacing Kamali and Tabatabaei, respectively. Navid Mohammadzadeh and Hossein Yari were also announced as members of the cast.

=== Filming ===
Filming was underway by March 2026, with Jamshid Mahmoudi directing and Navid Mahmoudi producing. Reports published during production described the series as being set in the 1940s in the Iranian calendar and listed Navid Mohammadzadeh, Milad Keymaram, Pardis Ahmadieh, and Hossein Yari among its principal cast.
