= Mojtaba Pirzadeh =

Iranian actor (born 1986)

- مجتبی پیرزاده
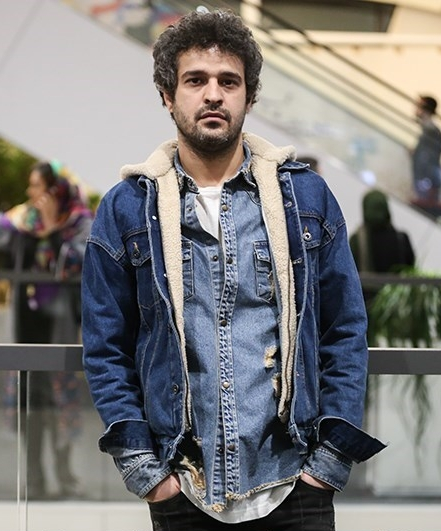
- Pirzadeh at the 2019 Fajr Film Festival
- Born: January 1, 1986 (age 40); Tehran, Iran
- Education: Soore University
- Occupation: Actor
- Years active: 2012–present
- Spouse: Farzaneh Tafreshi
- Children: 1

Mojtaba Pirzadeh (Persian: مجتبی پیرزاده; born January 1, 1986) is an Iranian actor. He is best known for his role in the 2016 drama film The Salesman, which won the Academy Award for Best Foreign Language Film. He is also known for his performances in Rona, Azim's Mother (2018) and No Choice (2020). Pirzadeh received critical acclaim and a Crystal Simorgh nomination for Best Supporting Actor for his performance in the drama film Tooman (2020).

Pirzadeh has also starred in the drama television series Awning (2017–2018), the biopic film Gholamreza Takhti (2019), the horror web series Them (2021), the mystery web series The Translator (2023), the war film Metropole Cinema (2023), and the crime web series The Lion Skin (2023).

== Filmography ==
=== Film ===
Year	Title	Role	Director	Notes
2016	Bridge of Sleep	Taxi Driver	Oktay Baraheni	
2016	The Salesman	Majid	Asghar Farhadi	
2017	Fish Lake	Rahman	Maryam Dousti	
2017	A Special Day	Behrouz	Homayoun As'adian	
2017	Golden Time	Faraz Sarabi	Pouria Kakavand	
2018	Rona, Azim's Mother	Faroogh	Jamshid Mahmoudi	
2019	Gholamreza Takhti	Takhti's friend	Bahram Tavakoli	
2019	The Pink Line		Bayan Zarabi	Short film
2020	Tooman	Aziz	Morteza Farshbaf	
2020	No Choice	Mojtaba	Reza Dormishian	
2021	Exit Tax		Saeed Hasanlou	Short film
2022	Towards the Night		Saeed Keshavarz	Short film
2022	The Craws		Shiva Sarmast	Short film
2023	Metropole Cinema		Mohammad Ali Bashe Ahangar	

=== Web ===
Year	Title	Role	Director	Platform	Notes
2012	Frozen Heart	Worker	Saman Moghadam	Namava	Guest role
2021	Them	Maziar	Mehdi Aghajani	Filmnet	Episode: "Everything Is Over"
2023	The Translator	Davood	Bahram Tavakoli	Namava	Main role, 13 episodes
2023	The Lion Skin	Mansour Bajelan	Jamshid Mahmoudi	Filmnet	Main role, 4 episodes
2023	Amsterdam	Shoja	Masoud Gharagozlu	Tamashakhaneh	Main role
2023	Turkish Coffee	Parham Pashaee	Alireza Amini	Filmnet	Main role
2023–2024	The Marsh	Kouhyar	Borzou Niknejad	Filmnet	Main role
2024–2025	Die Hard	Ashkan	Mostafa Taghizadeh	Filmnet	Main role
2026	Yal		Jamshid Mahmoudi	Filmnet	Main role

=== Television ===
Year	Title	Role	Director	Network	Notes
2017–2018	Awning	Sohrab Eghbali	Jamshid Mahmoudi, Navid Mahmoudi	IRIB TV2	Leading role; 50 episodes

== Theatre ==
Year	Title
2013	Garden of Wishes
2014	Death of a Salesman
2014	Pinter's Monologue
2014	What You Hear is a Crooked Instrument of Silence
2015	B5-6
2015	Good Night, Mr. Kenneth
2015	A Journey to the Farthest Away
2016	According to Gunpowder
2016	Socrates
2017	Oedipus Afghan
2017	Breakfast in the Evening
2019	Algerian Butterfly
2024	Misery

== Awards and nominations ==
Award	Year	Category	Nominated Work	Result	Ref.
Fajr Film Festival	2020	Best Actor in a Supporting Role	Tooman	Nominated	
Hafez Awards	2019	Best Actor – Television Series Drama	Awning	Nominated	
Hafez Awards	2023	Best Actor – Television Series Drama	The Lion Skin	Nominated	
Jam-e-Jam Television Festival	2019	Best Actor	Awning	Nominated	
