= Mirsaeed Molavian =

Iranian actor (born 1989)

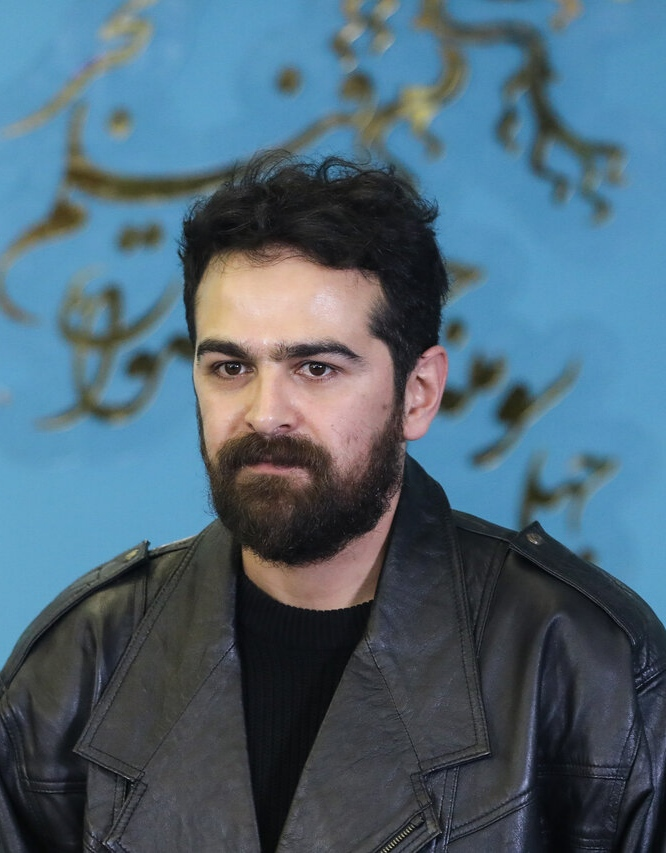
- Molavian at the 2025 Fajr Film Festival
- Born: Mirsaeed Molavian Khelejaninezhad; June 27, 1989 (age 37); Tabriz, East Azerbaijan, Iran
- Education: University College of Nabi Akram (MFA)
- Occupation: Actor
- Years active: 2000–present
- Spouse: Shiva (m.)

Mirsaeed Molavian Khelejaninezhad (Persian: میرسعید مولویان خلجانی نژاد; born June 27, 1989) is an Iranian actor. He gained recognition after portraying Reza Fakhar in the romance historical drama Once Upon a Time in Iran (2021–2022). Molavian earned a Crystal Simorgh nomination, a Hafez Award nomination and an Iran's Film Critics and Writers Association Award nomination for his performance as a gambler in the 2020 drama film Tooman.

== Early life ==
Mirsaeed Molavian Khelejaninezhad was born on June 27, 1989, in Tabriz, East Azerbaijan, Iran.

== Filmography ==
=== Film ===
| Year | Title | Role | Director | Notes | Ref(s) |
|---|---|---|---|---|---|
| 2017 | Cafe Ka | | Hadi Amini | Short film | |
| 2020 | Tooman | Davood | Morteza Farshbaf | | |
| 2021 | Faranak | Driver | Mehrnoush Alia | Short film | |
| 2023 | The Orange Forest | Ali Baharian | Arman Khansarian | | |
| 2023 | Achilles | Farid | Farhad Delaram | | |
| 2023 | Ropewalker Memories | The Son | Hamed Rajabi | | |
| 2025 | Guardian of the Field | Ayhan | Mohammad Reza Kheradmandan | | |

=== Web ===
| Year | Title | Role | Director | Platform | Notes | Ref(s) |
|---|---|---|---|---|---|---|
| 2021–2022 | Once Upon a Time in Iran | Reza Fakhar | Tina Pakravan | Namava | Main role; 17 episodes | |
| 2025 | Aban | Amir Parto | Reza Dadooi | Sheyda | Main role | |
| 2025–2026 | Word by Word | Mansour Mohajer | Parviz Shahbazi | Sheyda | Main role | |

== Theatre ==
| Year | Title | Playwright | Director | Stage | Ref(s) |
|---|---|---|---|---|---|
| 2014, 2017–2018 | A Life in the Theatre | David Mamet | Mohammad Berahmani | Iranian Artists Forum, Shahrzad Theater Complex, Tehran Independent Theater | |
| 2017 | Suggestion | Mohammad Madhvar, Rashad Moeini | Rashad Moeini | City Theater of Tabriz | |
| 2019 | Curse of the Starving Class | Sam Shepard | Ashkan Khatibi | Iranshahr Theatre | |

== Awards and nominations ==
Name of the award ceremony, year presented, category, nominee of the award, and the result of the nomination
| Award | Year | Category | Nominated work | Result | Ref(s) |
|---|---|---|---|---|---|
| Fajr Film Festival | 2020 | Best Actor in a Leading Role | Tooman | Nominated | |
| Fajr Film Festival | 2023 | Best Actor in a Leading Role | The Orange Forest | Nominated | |
| Fajr Film Festival | 2025 | Best Actor in a Supporting Role | Guardian of the Field | Nominated | |
| Hafez Awards | 2021 | Best Actor – Motion Picture | Tooman | Nominated | |
| Hafez Awards | 2024 | Best Actor – Motion Picture | The Orange Forest | Nominated | |
| Iran's Film Critics and Writers Association | 2022 | Best Actor in a Leading Role | Tooman | Nominated | |
| Iran's Film Critics and Writers Association | 2025 | Best Actor in a Leading Role | The Orange Forest | Won | |
| University Theater Festival | 2014 | Best Play – Stage Competition | I Am Narrating Hamlet | Nominated | |
| University Theater Festival | 2014 | Best Director– Stage Competition | I Am Narrating Hamlet | Nominated | |
| Urban International Film Festival | 2025 | Best Actor | The Orange Forest | Nominated | |
