= Behzad Khalaj =

Iranian actor (born 1975)

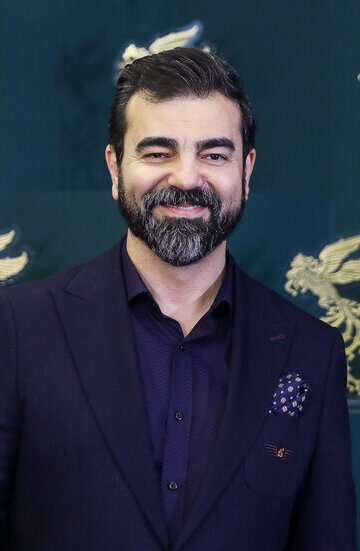
- Khalaj at the 2024 Fajr International Film Festival
- Born: April 20, 1975 (age 51); Tehran, Iran
- Occupations: Actor; director
- Years active: 2010–present
- Children: 2

Behzad Khalaj (Persian: بهزاد خلج; born April 20, 1975) is an Iranian actor. He is best known for his roles in Mr. Judge (2022–present), The Lion Skin (2022–2023), and The Lost Prestige (2023). Khalaj won the Crystal Simorgh for Best Supporting Actor at the 42nd Fajr International Film Festival for his performance in Majnoon (2024). He earned two Hafez Award nominations for his roles in Mr. Judge and A Delayed Death (2025).

== Early life ==
Behzad Khalaj was born on April 20, 1975, in Tehran, Iran. He is originally an Iranian Khalaj. He has two sons named Arshia and Barbod, who are both actors.

== Filmography ==
=== Film ===
Year	Title	Role	Director	Notes	Ref(s)
2016	Nasrin		Hossein Shahbazi	Short film	
2018	Damascus Time	Iranian flight group	Ebrahim Hatamikia		
2018	The Stranger and the Wind		Hamid Reza Ahmadi, Hamed Ahmadi	Short film	
2018	Intensification	Nader	Shirin Sabour	Short film	
2018	Hot Milk	Man	Armin Hemmati	Short film	
2018	Roya	Driver	Majid Shahmohammadi	Short film	
2019	Snake Venom		Javad Razavian		
2019	Small Panda, Big Panda	Farid	Sahar Khoshnam	Short film	
2019	Box Man		Manouchehr Teymourzadeh	Short film	
2020	Zagzwang	Man	Alireza Mohammadi Rouzbahani	Short film	
2020	Light Room		Pouya Aghelizadeh	Short film	
2021	Good Girl		Raheleh Karami	Short film	
2022	Middle Eastern Stories: Father	Father	Reza Daghagh	Short film	
2022	The Wolf		Milad Rabi'i	Short film	
2023	Leather Jacket Man	Major	Hossein Mirzamohammadi		
2023	Degeneration		Mohammad Reza Sarvestani	Short film	
2023	Posterity		Mona Ramezani	Short film	
2024	Alligator Blood	Farid Ghanbari	Javad Ezzati		
2024	Majnoon	Reza Hassanpour	Mehdi Shamohammadi		
2024	Resemblance		Mehdi Marvdashti	Short film	
2024	Campaign		Shahram Asadzadeh	Completed in 2021	
2026	Falling House		Mohsen Gharaee		
TBA	Midnight Sun		Shahriar Bahrani	Completed in 2021	
TBA	Puzzle of Imagination		Soheil Azharian	Short film; Completed in 2022	

=== Web ===
Year	Title	Role	Director	Platform	Notes	Ref(s)
2019–2020	Mannequin	Behzad Khalaj	Hossein Soheilizadeh	Filimo, Namava	Recurring role	
2021	Red Square	Navid	Ebrahim Ebrahimian	Filimo	Recurring role; 8 episodes	
2022–2023	The Lion Skin	Rasoul Fouladvand	Jamshid Mahmoudi	Filmnet	Supporting role; 22 episodes	
2023	The Lost Prestige	Esmail / Safdar Kouti	Sajad Pahlevanzadeh	Filimo	Main role; 7 episodes	
2025	Aban	Adham	Reza Dadooi	Sheyda	Guest appearance; 3 episodes	
2025	One Way Ticket	Shakib	Pouria Heidary Oureh	Namava	Miniseries; Supporting role	
2025	A Delayed Death	Ajal	Adel Tabrizi	Filmnet	Main role; 20 episodes	

=== Television ===
Year	Title	Role	Director	Network	Notes	Ref(s)
2017	Border of Happiness	Police	Ali Khodsiani	IRIB TV2	TV series; guest appearance	
2017	Traveling at Home		Bahman Goudarzi	IRIB Nasim	TV series; guest appearance	
2017	Agate		Behrang Tofighi	IRIB TV3	TV series; guest appearance	
2017	The Yellow Tape		Pouria Azarbaijani	IRIB TV2	TV series; guest appearance	
2017	Better Days: The Last Letter Episodes	Dr. Khazenifar	Danesh Eghbashavi	IRIB TV3	TV series; main role	
2017–2020	Narrative	Amir	Seyyed Jamal Seyyed Hatami, Hossein Ghena'at	IRIB TV1	TV series; supporting role	
2019	Talk to Me	Salehzadeh	Azadeh Mohammadi	IRIB TV3	TV film; main role	
2019	Dear Brother	Dr. Abbas	Mohammad Reza Ahanj	IRIB TV3	TV series; guest appearance	
2021	Silhouette	Ali Mechanic	Reza Mohebi Nouri	IRIB TV1	TV theater; main role	
2021	Frontline	Emad	Shahriar Bahrani	IRIB TV1	TV miniseries; supporting role	
2022–2024	Mr. Judge	Judge Behzad Khalaj	Sajjad Mehregan	IRIB TV2	TV series; leading role	

== Theatre ==
Year	Title	Playwright	Director	Stage	Ref(s)
2017	The Resistible Rise of Arturo Ui	Bertolt Brecht	Amir Dezhakam	Hafez Hall	
2017	The Balkan Women	Jules Tasca	Hossein Shahbazi	Mehr Hall	
2017	Between Worlds	Éric-Emmanuel Schmitt	Behzad Khalaj	Azad Film Workshop	
2018–2019	Khayyam	Behrouz Gharibpour	Behrouz Gharibpour	Ferdowsi Hall	
2018	He Has Become a Man	Asoo Bahari	Asoo Bahari	Iranshahr Theater	
2019	My Seagull	Kiumars Moradi	Kiumars Moradi	Iranshahr Theater	
2024	Chaplin	Mehran Ranjbar	Mehran Ranjbar	City Theater of Tehran	
2025	The Owl	Saeed Hasanlou	Saeed Hasanlou	Iranshahr Theater	

== Awards and nominations ==
Name of the award ceremony, year presented, category, nominee of the award, and the result of the nomination
Award	Year	Category	Nominated Work	Result	Ref(s)
Action on Film International Megafest	2019	Best Supporting Actor – Hollywood Dreams	Box Man	Nominated	
Fajr International Film Festival	2024	Best Actor in a Supporting Role	Majnoon	Won	
Hafez Awards	2024	Best Actor – Television Series Drama	Mr. Judge	Nominated	
Hafez Awards	2025	Best Actor – Television Series Comedy	A Delayed Death	Nominated	
Red Rock Film Festival	2022	Best Acting in a Fiction Short	Middle Eastern Stories: Father	Nominated	
