= Sara Bahrami =

Iranian actress (born 1983)

- سارا بهرامی
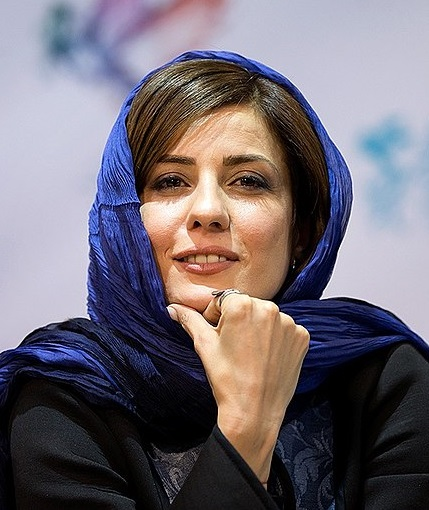
- Bahrami at the 2018 Fajr Film Festival
- Born: January 22, 1983 (age 43); Isfahan, Iran
- Education: Tonekabon University
- Occupation: Actress
- Years active: 2009–present

Sara Bahrami (Persian: سارا بهرامی; born January 22, 1983) is an Iranian actress. She has received various accolades, including a Crystal Cymorgh, an Iran Cinema Celebration Award and two Iran's Film Critics and Writers Association Awards.

== Career ==
Bahrami began her artistic journey at the age of nine by attending acting classes at the Institute for the Intellectual Development of Children and Young Adults. This early involvement introduced her to theater, laying the foundation for her acting career. Born in the central Iranian city of Isfahan, Sara Bahrami has studied Theater at university.

Sara Bahrami holds a bachelor's degree in theater from Tonekabon University in Mazandaran. After graduating, she moved to Tehran, where she enrolled in various acting workshops. Notably, she attended the Karnameh Institute, led by renowned Iranian actors Parviz Parastui and Habib Rezaei.

Bahrami's first on-screen appearance was in a short film. However, her official film debut came in 2009 with the movie Facing Mirrors (Āyenehā-ye Ruberu). Her breakthrough role in television came with the series Parvaneh, where she garnered attention as a rising star in Iranian cinema and television. She further solidified her reputation with her performances in the TV series Pardeh Neshin and gained fame in the film industry with roles in Italy Italy and Woodpecker (Darkoob).

She has acted in series such as Euphrates, Like a Nightmare, Parvaneh, and The Recluse.

Bahrami has also appeared in a number of movies, including Gita, Teheran, A Simple Romance, Italy Italy, A House on 41st Street and I am Diego Maradona.

== Filmography ==
=== Film ===
Year	Title	Role	Director	Notes	Ref(s)
2009	Tehran		Nader Takmil Homayoun		
2009	A Song for Louba	Louba	Toufan Nahan Ghodrati	Short film	
2010	I Can't Imagine Tomorrow		Kaveh Sabaghzadeh	Short film	
2011	Facing Mirrors	Marjan	Negar Azarbaijani		
2012	A Simple Love Story	Khorshid	Saman Moghaddam		
2013	Before Sunrise	Shirin	Tahmineh Bahramalian	Short film	
2015	I Am Diego Maradona	Roya	Bahram Tavakoli		
2015	Sympathy		Samira Shakouri	Short film	
2016	Gita	Nastaran	Masoud Maddadi		
2016	A House on 41st Street	Hamideh	Hamid Reza Ghorbani		
2016	You Just Be My Mother	Sara	Roghayeh Tavakoli	Short film	
2017	Italy Italy	Barfa	Kaveh Sabaghzadeh		
2017	Let Us Move On		Maryam Naraghi	Short film	
2018	Axing	Mahsa	Behrouz Shoeibi		
2018	Centipede	Elham	Abolhassan Davoudi		
2018	Staircase		Mohsen Banihashemi	Short film	
2019	Jamshidieh	Taraneh	Yalda Jebeli		
2019	Repression	Paria	Reza Gouran		
2020	Latyan	Yasi	Ali Teymoori		
2020	The Painter's Wife		Soheil Danesh Eshraghi	Short film; unreleased	
2021	Bright House	Maryam	Rouhollah Hejazi		
2021	Barter	Naghmeh	Ziba Karamali	Short film	
2021	Dear Enemy		Soheil Danesh Eshraghi	Short film; unreleased	
2022	Killing a Traitor	Atlas	Masoud Kimiai		
2022	Grassland	Sara	Kazem Daneshi		
2023	Left, Right	Masoumeh	Hamed Mohammadi		
2023	The Orange Forest	Maryam Seifi	Arman Khansarian		
2023	After Leaving	Mona	Reza Nejati		
2023	Terrestrial Verses	School Principal (voice)	Ali Asgari, Alireza Khatami		
2024	The Year of the Cat		Mostafa Taghizadeh		
2025	Khati		Fereydoun Najafi		

=== Web ===
Year	Title	Role	Director	Platform	Ref(s)
2018	Made in Iran 2	Parisa	Borzou Niknejad	Video CD	
2019–2020	Rhino	Raha / Najmeh	Kiarash Asadizadeh	Filimo, Namava	
2021	Mutual Friendship	Herself	Shahab Hosseini	Namava	
2021–2022	The Professional	Sonia	Mostafa Taghizadeh	Namava	
2022	The Therapist		Amin Hosseinpour	Filimo	
2022	Cold Blooded	Rana	Amir Hossein Torabi	FILMNET	
2023	You Only Go Around Once	Herself	Soroush Sehhat	Filimo, Namava	
2023	The Accomplice	Mitra	Maziar Miri	Namava	
2024	The Loser	Arghavan Amini	Amin Hosseinpour	Filimo	
2025	Beretta		Amir Hossein Torabi	FILMNET	
2026	Blindness	Hana	Sajjad Pahlavanzadeh	FILMNET	

=== Television ===
Year	Title	Role	Director	Notes	Network	Ref(s)
2011	Euphrates		Maziar Miri	TV series	IRIB TV2	
2011	Like a Nightmare		Shahram Shah Hosseini	TV series	IRIB TV1	
2013	Parvaneh	Parvaneh	Jalil Saman	TV series	IRIB TV3	
2014	Curtain Dweller	Maedeh	Behrouz Shoeibi	TV series	IRIB TV1	
2018	Get Together	Herself	Mehran Modiri	TV program	IRIB Nasim	

== Awards and nominations ==
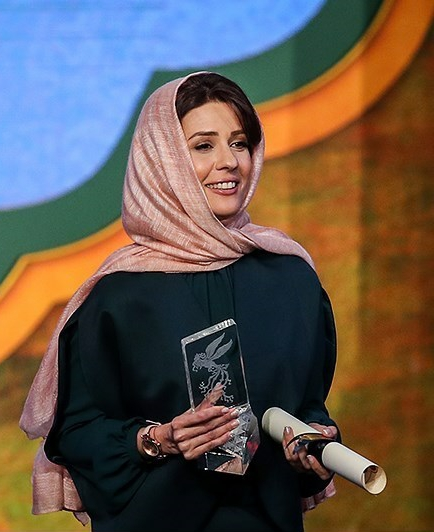
Bahrami holding Crystal Simorgh for Best Actress for her role in Axing at the 36th Fajr Film Festival, February 2018

Name of the award ceremony, year presented, category, nominee of the award, and the result of the nomination
Award	Year	Category	Nominated Work	Result	Ref.
Fajr Film Festival	2017	Best Actress in a Leading Role	Italy Italy	Nominated	
Fajr Film Festival	2018	Best Actress in a Leading Role	Axing	Won	
Fajr Film Festival	2022	Best Actress in a Leading Role	Grassland	Nominated	
Fajr Film Festival	2023	Best Actress in a Leading Role	The Orange Forest	Nominated	
Hafez Awards	2017	Best Actress – Motion Picture	A House on 41st Street	Nominated	
Hafez Awards	2018	Best Actress – Motion Picture	Italy Italy	Nominated	
Hafez Awards	2019	Best Actress – Motion Picture	Axing	Nominated	
Hafez Awards	2024	Best Actress – Motion Picture	The Orange Forest	Nominated	
Hafez Awards	2025	Best Actress – Theatre	Pockets Full of Bread	Nominated	
Iran Cinema Celebration	2017	Best Actress in a Supporting Role	A House on 41st Street	Nominated	
Iran Cinema Celebration	2019	Best Actress in a Leading Role	Axing	Won	
Iran's Film Critics and Writers Association	2016	Best Actress in a Supporting Role	A House on 41st Street	Honorary Diploma	
Iran's Film Critics and Writers Association	2017	Best Actress in a Leading Role	Italy Italy	Nominated	
Iran's Film Critics and Writers Association	2018	Best Actress in a Leading Role	Axing	Won	
Iran's Film Critics and Writers Association	2025	Best Actress in a Leading Role	Grassland	Nominated	
Iran's Film Critics and Writers Association	2025	Best Actress in a Leading Role	The Orange Forest	Won	
Malaysia International Film Festival	2019	Best Actress	Axing	Won	
