= Tooman =

- Film poster
- Directed by: Morteza Farshbaf
- Written by: Morteza Farshbaf
- Produced by: Saeed Sa'adi
- Starring: Mirsaeed Molavian; Mojtaba Pirzadeh; Pardis Ahmadieh; Iman Sayad Borhani; Hamed Nejabat; Sajad Babaei
- Cinematography: Morteza Najafi
- Edited by: Mehdi Sa'adi
- Music by: Mohamadreza Heydary
- Release dates: February 1, 2020 (FIFF); November 3, 2021 (Iran)
- Running time: 130 minutes
- Country: Iran
- Language: Persian

Tooman (Persian: تومان) is a 2020 Iranian drama film directed and written by Morteza Farshbaf. The film screened for the first time at the 38th Fajr Film Festival and earned 4 nominations and received 1 award. Morteza Najafi won a Crystal Simorgh for Best Cinematography.

== Premise ==
Davood bets his entire earning from a factory job on online soccer gambling; without ever losing on any game, he bets till he loses his life and love.

== Cast ==
- Mirsaeed Molavian as Davood
- Mojtaba Pirzadeh as Aziz
- Pardis Ahmadieh as Aylin
- Iman Sayad Borhani as Younes
- Hamed Nejabat as Ali
- Sajad Babaei as Mohammad

== Music ==
The soundtrack of this film is composed by Mohammad Reza Heidari. The opening music is "Katip Arzuhalim Yaz Yare Böyle" from Selda Bağcan and the ending music of the film is "Lucy" sung by He and His Friends.

== Reception ==
=== Accolades ===
Year	Award	Category	Recipient	Result
2020	Fajr Film Festival	Best Director	Morteza Farshbaf	Nominated
2020	Fajr Film Festival	Best Actor	Mirsaeed Molavian	Nominated
2020	Fajr Film Festival	Best Supporting Actor	Mojtaba Pirzadeh	Nominated
2020	Fajr Film Festival	Best Cinematography	Morteza Najafi	Won
2020	Fajr Film Festival	Best Sound	Best Sound Recording: Rashid Daneshman	Nominated
2020	Fajr Film Festival	Best Sound	Best Sound Editing: Amin Sharifi	Nominated
2020	Tallinn Black Nights Film Festival	Grand Prize	Morteza Farshbaf	Nominated
2021	Hafez Awards	Best Motion Picture	Tooman	Nominated
2021	Hafez Awards	Best Director – Motion Picture	Morteza Farshbaf	Nominated
2021	Hafez Awards	Best Screenplay – Motion Picture	Morteza Farshbaf	Nominated
2021	Hafez Awards	Best Actor – Motion Picture	Mirsaeed Molavian	Nominated
2021	Hafez Awards	Best Actress – Motion Picture	Pardis Ahmadieh	Won
2021	Hafez Awards	Best Cinematography – Motion Picture	Morteza Najafi	Won
2021	Hafez Awards	Best Editor – Motion Picture	Mehdi Saadi	Nominated
2022	Agrandisman Awards	Best Cinematography	Morteza Najafi	Won
2022	Agrandisman Awards	Best Graphic Designer	Saeed Forootan	Won
2022	1st Iranian Cinema Directors' Great Celebration	Best Film Director	Morteza Farshbaf	Nominated
2022	Iran's Film Critics and Writers Association	Best Film	Saeed Sa'adi	Nominated
2022	Iran's Film Critics and Writers Association	Best Director	Morteza Farshbaf	Nominated
2022	Iran's Film Critics and Writers Association	Best Screenplay	Morteza Farshbaf	Nominated
2022	Iran's Film Critics and Writers Association	Best Actor in a Leading Role	Mirsaeed Molavian	Nominated
2022	Iran's Film Critics and Writers Association	Best Cinematography	Morteza Najafi	Won
2022	Iran's Film Critics and Writers Association	Best Editor	Mehdi Sa'adi	Nominated
2022	Iran's Film Critics and Writers Association	Best Sound	Rashid Daneshmand, Amin Sharifi	Nominated
2022	Iran's Film Critics and Writers Association	Best Technical Achievement	Production Design: Morteza Farbod	Won
2022	Iran's Film Critics and Writers Association	Best Technical Achievement	Costume Design: Maral Jeyrani	Won
