= Aban (TV series) =

2025 Iranian television series

- Persian: آبان
- Genre: Drama; Melodrama; Romance
- Written by: Amir Mohammad Abdi; Pouria Kakavand
- Directed by: Reza Dadooi
- Starring: Laleh Marzban; Shahab Hosseini; Mirsaeed Molavian; Amin Hayai; Mina Sadati; Bahareh Kianafshar; Reza Akhlaghirad
- Composer: Amir Tavassoli
- Country of origin: Iran
- Original language: Persian
- No. of seasons: 1
- No. of episodes: 17

Production
- Producer: Majid Molaee
- Cinematography: Ehsan Rafi'ijam
- Editor: Emad Khodabakhsh

Original release
- Release: 29 January – 14 May 2025

Aban (Persian: آبان) is a 2025 Iranian television series written by Amir Mohammad Abdi and Pouria Kakavand, directed by Reza Dadooi, and starring Laleh Marzban as the titular character, alongside Shahab Hosseini, Mirsaeed Molavian, Amin Hayai, Mina Sadati, Bahareh Kianafshar, and Reza Akhlaghirad. The first episode premiered on Sheyda on January 29, 2025.

== Premise ==
Aban (Laleh Marzban), an AI genius, developed an algorithm to invest and profit in financial markets. However, after running into trouble with her former investor, she now faces a huge debt. If she doesn't settle it quickly, she could end up in prison.

== Cast ==
- Laleh Marzban as Aban Esfandiyari
- Shahab Hosseini as Fariborz Sabet
- Mirsaeed Molavian as Amir Parto
- Amin Hayai as Babak Mahmoudi
- Mina Sadati as Hedieh Pazouki
- Bahareh Kianafshar as Bahar
- Reza Akhlaghirad as Soroush
- Behzad Khalaj as Adham
- Hossein Mahjoub as Isa
- Hamid Ebrahimi as Mansour
- Rahim Norouzi as Mahmoud
- Manouchehr Zendedel as Kamrani
- Bahram Ebrahimi as Kahnamouei
- Maryam Sa'adat as Kahnamouei's wife
- Manouchehr Zendedel as Kamrani
- Faranak Kalantar
- Taranom Kermanian
- Tasnif Hosseini

== Music ==
Amir Tavassoli composed the music for the series. Mohsen Chavoshi performed the song "Sa‘at-e Divari va Koli" ("The Wall Clock and the Gypsy") for the series' end credits, which was released on 6 February 2025 and 12 March 2025, coinciding with the broadcast of new episodes.
