= Rima Raminfar =

Iranian actor and screenwriter (born 1970)

Rima Raminfar ریما رامین‌فر
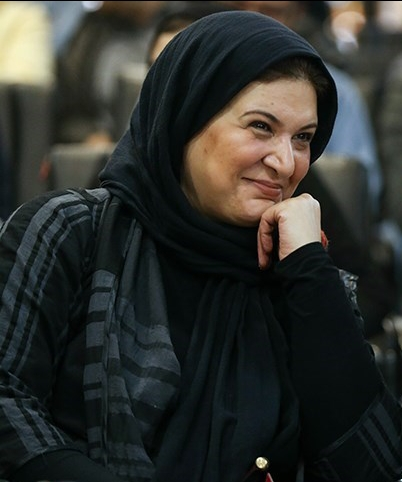
- Rima Raminfar, Tasnim News Agency
- Born: 25 March 1970 (age 56); Tehran, Iran
- Occupations: Actress, screenwriter
- Years active: 1997–present
- Height: 1.74 m (5 ft 9 in)
- Spouse: Amir Jafari
- Children: 1

Rima Raminfar (b. March 25, 1970; Persian: ریما رامین‌فر) is an Iranian actress and screenwriter. She is best known for her role as Homa Saadat in Capital (2011–2021). She has received various accolades, including a Hafez Award and an Iran's Film Critics and Writers Association Award, in addition to nominations for a Crystal Simorgh and an Iran Cinema Celebration Award.

== Early life ==
She has got an M.A. in theater directing. She started acting in theatre in 1997 by playing in 'night, Mother theater written by Marsha Norman. She entered in film industry by playing in Bread, Love, Motorcycle 1000 (2002) film. Raminfar is married to Amir Jafari and they have one son.

== Career ==
As soon as she entered university, Rima Raminfar became involved with theatre and she got interested in play-writing. Her first drama writing was titled as So till tomorrow and played in Fajr Theater festival winning the third award of play writing.

Her role play in Capital series (Paytakht) was one of Rima Raminfar's significant role playings. This series is one of the popular series which was broadcast on Iran's television channel from 2011. Her role, “Homa”, is one of the main characters of this series which produced in six seasons until today.

== Filmography ==
=== Film ===
- 2026 - Falling House
- 2023 - Hotel
- 2022 - Conjugal Visit
- 2015 - Abad va yek rouz
- 2015 - Zapas
- 2015 - Fasl E Narges
- 2014 - Marg E Mahi
- 2012 - Sizdah
- 2011 - Ghesse Ha
- 2010 - Yek Habe Ghand
- 2007 - Shirin
- 2007 - Rafigh E Bad
- 2000 - Nan Va Eshgh Va Motor 1000

=== Television film ===
- 2013 – Chand Rouz Bishtar
- 2010 – Akharin Rouz E Mah
- 2009 - Mish

=== Television series ===
- 2012 Check back
- 2011– Paytakht
- 2009 I'm a tenant

=== Television series writer ===
- 2007 - Charkhouneh
- 2004 - Kamarband Ha Ra BeBandim
- 2002 - Without Description

=== Theater actor ===
- 2013 – Where is here
- 2009 - Romulus the Great
- 2009- A stranger in house
- 2008 – Nightmares of Piroud
- 2008 – Whisper of the dead
- 2006 - Death of a Salesman
- 2002 – I'm going to buy newspaper
- 2001 - The same as ever
- 2000 – The dog's heart
- 2000 – So until to tomorrow
- 1999 – Dance of torn papers
- 1998 – Winter 66
- 1997 - Night, Mother

== Awards and nominations ==
- 2018 - Referee committee of 33rd Fajr International Film Festival
- 2018 - Winner of Nowruz eve festival as the best actress
- 2015 – Winner of the 15th Hafez Awards as the best actress
- 2010 – Nominee of the best supporting actor in 15th Iran cinema event for “Yek Habe Ghand” film
- 2010 – Nominee of the best second role in the 29th Fajr International Film Festival for “Yek Habe Ghand”
