= Saeed Changizian =

Iranian actor

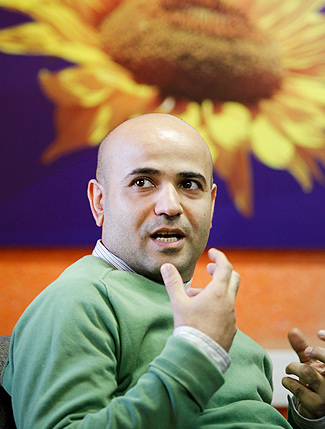
- Changizian in 2012
- Born: 13 December 1977 (age 48); Semnan, Iran
- Occupation: Actor
- Years active: 2003–present
- Spouse: Elham Korda

Saeed Changizian (Persian: سعید چنگیزیان; born 13 December 1977) is an Iranian actor. He is best known for his acting in Modest Reception (2012), Rona, Azim's Mother (2018) and Mortal Wound (2021).

== Career ==
Changizian has participated in several plays in collaboration with Mehr Theatre Group. He has acted in various MTG productions including Summerless and Ivanov.

== Filmography ==
=== Film ===
Year	Title	Role	Director	Notes
2003	Goodbye Buddy		Behzad Behzadpour	
2010	Shahe Pariyoun's Daughter	Fereydoun	Kamran Ghadakchian	
2012	Modest Reception	Soldier	Mani Haghighi	
2013	A Better World		Behrouz Shoeibi	
2013	The Shallow Yellow Sky		Bahram Tavakoli	
2013	The Corridor	Rezai	Behrouz Shoeibi	
2014	Negar's Role	Farzad	Ali Atshani	
2016	Sound And Fury	Interrogator	Houman Seyyedi	
2017	Sara And Ayda	Alireza	Maziar Miri	
2018	Andranik	Shahrokhtash	Hossein Mahkam	
2018	Rona, Azim's Mother	Hashem	Jamshid Mahmoudi	Selected as the Afghan entry for the Best Foreign Language Film at the 91st Academy Awards
2018	A Bigger Game		Abbas Nezamdoost	
2018	Istanbul Junction	Hamid	Mastafa Kiaei	
2019	Jamshidieh	Babak	Yalda Jebeli	
2020	Iron Cocoon		Armin Isarian	
2020	Gilda	Mani	Omid Bonakdar, Keyvan Alimohammadi	
2022	Subtraction		Mani Haghighi	

=== Web ===
Year	Title	Role	Director	Platform
2021	Mortal Wound	Naser Rizabadi	Mohammad Hossein Mahdavian	Filimo

=== Television ===
Year	Title	Role	Director	Network
2011	The Family Conspiracy	Timur	Rambod Javan	IRIB TV1
2015	Sometimes Look Behind You	Pooya	Maziar Miri	IRIB TV2
2019	Dear Brother	Satar	Mohammad Reza Ahanj	IRIB TV3

== Theaters ==
Year	Title
2008	Autumn Midnight Dream
2009	For A Handful of Rubles
2011	Ivanov
2012	Tantan and the Secret of Mondas Palace
2013	Sour Cherry Orchard
2013	Rumors
2015	The Silence Word of The Word
2015	Lieutenant Inishmore
2017	Oliver Twist
2017	Andranik
2018	Summerless
2019	The Kid
