= Modest Reception =

- Film poster
- Persian: پذیرایی ساده
- Directed by: Mani Haghighi
- Written by: Mani Haghighi
- Produced by: Mani Haghighi
- Starring: Taraneh Alidoosti; Mani Haghighi
- Music by: Abbas rasouli
- Release date: 13 February 2012 (Berlinale)
- Running time: 97 minutes
- Country: Iran
- Language: Persian

Modest Reception (Persian: پذیرایی ساده, romanized: Paziraie sadeh) is a 2012 Persian comedy film directed by Mani Haghighi.

== Cast ==
- Taraneh Alidoosti - Leyla
- Mani Haghighi - Kaveh
- Saeed Changizian - Soldier
- Esmaeel Khalaj - Old Man
- Saber Abar - Young Man
- Mohammad Aghebati - Cafe Owner

== Plot ==
A couple from Tehran drive around a remote mountainous region or Avroman. They hand out bags of cash as charity by their mother to poor residents in the area.
