= The Orange Forest =

- Film poster
- Directed by: Arman Khansarian
- Written by: Arman Khansarian
- Produced by: Rasoul Sadrameli
- Starring: Mirsaeed Molavian; Sara Bahrami
- Cinematography: Masoud Amini Tirani
- Edited by: Mohammad Najarian
- Music by: Ali Samadpour
- Production company: Farabi Cinema Foundation
- Distributed by: Shahr Farang
- Release dates: February 1, 2023 (FIFF); October 25, 2023 (Iran)
- Running time: 93 minutes
- Country: Iran
- Language: Persian

The Orange Forest (Persian: جنگل پرتقال, romanized: Jangal-e Porteghal) is a 2023 Iranian drama film written and directed by Arman Khansarian in his feature directorial debut. Starring Mirsaeed Molavian and Sara Bahrami, it premiered at the 41st Fajr Film Festival, where it was nominated for three Crystal Simorghs.

== Premise ==
Ali Baharian (Mirsaeed Molavian), a teacher who goes by the artistic name Sohrab Baharian, studied playwriting and, after years of unemployment, has recently begun working as a literature teacher at a school. A strict and uncompromising educator, he expels five students from his class in just three days. As a result, the principal warns him that if he does not submit his academic credentials within two days, his job will be at risk. Reluctantly, Ali travels to his hometown of Tonekabon, the city where he pursued his studies, to meet with his university friends, including his former girlfriend, Maryam Seifi (Sara Bahrami), who, after a tragic accident, has lost her memory.

== Cast ==
- Mirsaeed Molavian as Ali Baharian
- Sara Bahrami as Maryam Seifi
- Reza Behboudi
- Reza Amouzad
- Faraz Sarabi
- Mohammad Reza Samian
- Hamid Reza Abbasi
- Davood Fathali Beigi
- Maryam Ghorbani
- Fereshteh Mar'ashi
- Arshia Nikbin
- Zeinab Sha'bani
- Hesam Nourani

== Reception ==
=== Awards and nominations ===
Award	Year	Category	Recipient	Result	Ref(s)
Fajr International Film Festival	2023	Best Actor in a Leading Role	Mirsaeed Molavian	Nominated	
Fajr International Film Festival	2023	Best Actress in a Leading Role	Sara Bahrami	Nominated	
Fajr International Film Festival	2023	Best First Film	Arman Khansarian	Nominated	
Hafez Awards	2024	Best Actor – Motion Picture	Mirsaeed Molavian	Nominated	
Hafez Awards	2024	Best Actress – Motion Picture	Sara Bahrami	Nominated	
Hafez Awards	2024	Best Director – Motion Picture	Arman Khansarian	Nominated	
Hafez Awards	2024	Best Screenplay – Motion Picture	Arman Khansarian	Won	
Hafez Awards	2024	Best Motion Picture	Rasoul Sadrameli	Nominated	
