= Amir Norouzi =

Iranian actor (born 1986)

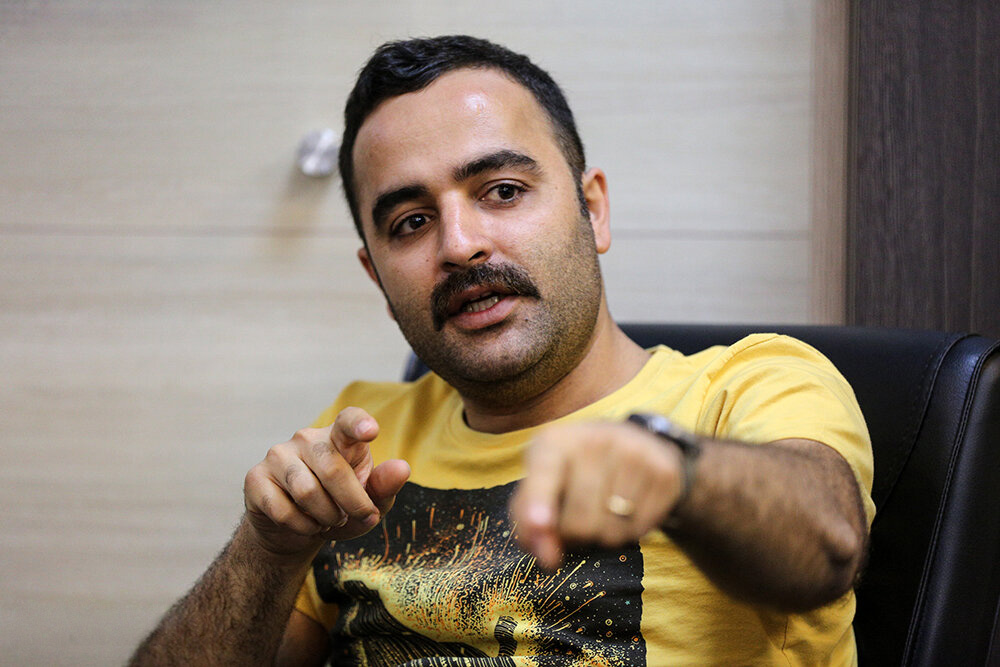
- Norouzi in 2021
- Born: October 22, 1986 (age 39); Tehran, Iran
- Education: Tehran University of Art
- Occupations: Actor; screenwriter
- Years active: 2003–present
- Spouse: Afsaneh Babaee

Amir Norouzi (Persian: امیر نوروزی; born October 22, 1986) is an Iranian actor and screenwriter. He is best known for his roles in I Want to Live (2021), Once Upon a Time Mars (2022–2023), and The Lost Prestige (2023). Norouzi received critical acclaim and a Crystal Simorgh for Best Actor nomination for his performance in the drama film Mom (2021).

== Filmography ==
=== Film ===
Year	Title	Role	Director	Notes	Ref(s)
2015	The Ride		Ali Khamehparast	as screenwriter	
2021	Expediency	Masoud Ghasemi	Hossein Darabi		
2021	Mom	Fereydoun Mokhtari	Arash Aneessee	Nominated – Crystal Simorgh Fajr Film Festival Award for Best Actor	
2022	Antifreeze		Abouzar Paknezhad	Short film	
2025	1968		Amir Mehdi Pourvaziri	Nominated – Crystal Simorgh Fajr Film Festival Award for Best Actor	
2025	Antique		Hadi Naiji		
2025	Far in the Middle of the East		Arash Aneessee		
2026	Gambler		Mohsen Bahari		
TBA	Diazepam		Meysam Me'raji		

=== Web ===
Year	Title	Role	Director	Platform	Notes	Ref(s)
2021	I Want to Live	Yahya Farrokhi	Shahram Shah Hosseini	Filimo	Main role	
2021	Normal People	Khosrow Kharabati	Rambod Javan	Filimo	Main role	
2022–2023	Once Upon a Time Mars	Eskandar New Shahabi / Esi New Akbari	Peyman Ghasemkhani, Mohsen Chegini	Filimo, Namava	Main role	
2023	Turkish Coffee	Afghan man	Alireza Amini	Filmnet	Supporting role	
2023	The Lost Prestige	Farshad	Sajad Pahlevanzadeh	Filimo	Main role	
2024	Dariush	Alireza	Hadi Hejazifar	Filmnet	Main role	
2025	Girls of Grief Alley		Ali Jafarabadi	Filmnet	Leading role	
2025	Hunting Ground	Jamshid Namjoo	Nima Javidi	Filimo	Supporting role	
2026	Polka Dot	Hassan Isavi	Ebrahim Irajzad	Sheyda	Supporting role	
2026	Blindness	Behzad Zarrabi	Sajjad Pahlavanzadeh	Filmnet	Supporting role	

== Theatre ==
Year	Title	Playwright	Director	Stage	Ref(s)
2018, 2019–2020	Launcher 5	Pouya Saeedi, Masoud Sarami	Pouya Saeedi, Masoud Sarami	City Theater of Tehran, Tehran Independent Theater, Iranshahr Theater	
2022	The Third of May	Saeed Hassanlou	Saeed Hassanlou	Iranshahr Theater	
2023	The Professional	Vahid Montazeri	Vahid Montazeri	City Theater of Tehran	

== Awards and nominations ==
Name of the award ceremony, year presented, category, nominee of the award, and the result of the nomination
Award	Year	Category	Nominated Work	Result	Ref(s)
Fajr Film Festival	2021	Best Actor in a Leading Role	Mom	Nominated	
Fajr Film Festival	2025	Best Actor in a Leading Role	1968	Nominated	
Fajr Theater Festival	2019	Best Actor – First National Competition	Launcher 5	Runner-up	
Hafez Awards	2022	Best Actor – Theater	Launcher 5	Nominated	
