= Guardian of the Field =

- Film poster
- Directed by: Mohammad Reza Kheradmandan
- Written by: Mohammad Reza Kheradmandan; Hamid Akbari Khameneh
- Produced by: Mehdi Faraji
- Starring: Hadi Hejazifar; Mirsaeed Molavian; Shabnam Ghorbani; Ali Salehi; Saeed Aghakhani; Ali Mosaffa
- Cinematography: Morteza Ghafouri
- Edited by: Hamid Najafirad
- Music by: Hamed Sabet
- Production company: Soureh Cinema Organization
- Release date: January 31, 2025 (FIFF)
- Country: Iran
- Language: Persian

Guardian of the Field (Persian: ناتور دشت, romanized: Natoor-e Dasht) is a 2025 Iranian drama thriller film written by Mohammad Reza Kheradmandan and Hamid Akbari Khameneh, directed by Kheradmandan, and starring Hadi Hejazifar, Mirsaeed Molavian, Shabnam Ghorbani, Ali Salehi, Saeed Aghakhani and Ali Mosaffa. It premiered at the 43rd Fajr Film Festival on January 31, 2025.

== Plot ==
Ahmad Piran (Hadi Hejazifar), a respected figure in his village in Iran, is getting ready to travel to the city to support his son in an important sports competition. However, when he hears that the daughter of one of his friends has gone missing, he decides to stay behind. Despite his apprentice Ayhan's (Mirsaeed Molavian) repeated suggestions that he should go to the competition, knowing how much his son has worked for it, Ahmad feels a strong sense of responsibility to his community. He begins gathering the villagers to search for the missing girl. A heartfelt video of Ahmad and the villagers asking for help in searching the vast fields is shared, and soon, a large group of people arrives to the village. After hours of searching, there's no sign of the girl. Ahmad's friend tells him that his daughter may have been kidnapped by someone who knows him and is aware of his leg problem. They begin to search every house in the village.

== Cast ==
- Hadi Hejazifar as Ahmad Piran
- Mirsaeed Molavian as Ayhan
- Shabnam Ghorbani as Helma
- Ali Salehi as Mashhad
- Saeed Aghakhani
- Ali Mosaffa as Bayram
- Babak Karimi as Helma's father
- Taranom Kermanian
- Arghavan Azizi as Yasna
- Amir Dezhakam
- Ardeshir Rostami

== Reception ==
=== Awards and nominations ===
Award	Year	Category	Recipient	Result	Ref(s)
Fajr Film Festival	2025	Best Actor in a Supporting Role	Mirsaeed Molavian	Nominated	
Fajr Film Festival	2025	Best Production Design	Mohammad Hossein Karami	Nominated	
Fajr Film Festival	2025	Best National Film	Mehdi Faraji	Won	
Fajr Film Festival	2025	Audience Choice of Best Film	Mehdi Faraji	Nominated	

Guardian of the Field ranked fourth in the public voting for Audience Choice of Best Film.
