= The Lion Skin =

2022–2023 Iranian television series

- Persian: پوست شیر
- Genre: Drama; Thriller; Crime
- Created by: Mahmoudi Brothers
- Written by: Reza Baharvand; Jamshid Mahmoudi
- Directed by: Jamshid Mahmoudi
- Starring: Hadi Hejazifar; Alireza Kamali; Shahab Hosseini; Pantea Bahram; Zhila Shahi; Mehrdad Sedighian; Pardis Ahmadieh; Behzad Khalaj
- Music by: Bamdad Afshar
- Country of origin: Iran
- Original language: Persian
- No. of seasons: 3
- No. of episodes: 24

Production
- Producer: Navid Mahmoudi
- Cinematography: Morteza Ghafouri
- Editor: Sara Ahani
- Running time: 45–77 minutes

Original release
- Network: Filmnet
- Release: 23 September 2022 – 19 April 2023

The Lion Skin (Persian: پوست شیر, romanized: Poost-e Shir) is an Iranian television series created by the brothers Jamshid and Navid Mahmoudi for Filmnet. It stars Hadi Hejazifar as the lead character, with Alireza Kamali, Shahab Hosseini, Pantea Bahram, Zhila Shahi, Mehrdad Sedighian, Pardis Ahmadieh and Behzad Khalaj.

== Plot ==
After years in prison, Naeem (Hadi Hejazifar) is released and goes after his only passion, his daughter Sahel (Pardis Ahmadieh). His daughter avoids her father because of his absence during these years. After being convinced by Naeem's friend (Alireza Kamali), despite the opposition of her mother (Pantea Bahram) and her mother's husband (Babak Karimi), who does not know that her father is alive, Sahel goes on a trip with her father Naeem. Sahel, who again starts to feel close to her father during the trip, tells him that she plans to emigrate and will soon emigrate for university. Naeem gets angry and they immediately get in the car to go back to Tehran so that he can talk to Sahel's mother and say that he will not allow his daughter to be separated from him again. On the way back, Naeem feels dizzy and bad and gets out of the car and faints on the ground. When he wakes up on the floor the next morning, there is no sign of his daughter.

== Cast ==
- Hadi Hejazifar as Naeem Molaee
- Alireza Kamali as Reza Abdollahi (Parvaneh)
- Shahab Hosseini as Moheb Meshkat
- Pantea Bahram as Leila Barzegar
- Zhila Shahi as Mozhgan
- Mehrdad Sedighian as Sadra Kouhestani
- Pardis Ahmadieh as Sahel Molaee
- Behzad Khalaj as Rasoul Fouladvand
- Babak Karimi as Behzad Sahraee
- Saeed Dashti as Saeed Yarahmadi
- Mojtaba Pirzadeh as Masoud Bajelan
- Kamran Tafti as Nariman Gholami
- Anahita Afshar as Shirin Beigzadeh
- Mohammad Reza Maleki as Samad Behlouli
- Roya Javidnia as Sadra's mother
- Morteza Khanjani as Behnam Azizi
- Ali Osivand as Jelveh
- Alireza Ostadi as Behrouz
- Ehsan Amani as Manouchehr Mardani
- Farid Sajjadi Hosseini as Retired major
- Bahram Ebrahimi as Bahman
- Ramin Rastad as Majid Nouri
- Mohammad Reza Sarvestani as Mavaddat
- Afsaneh Tehranchi as Vajihe
- Dorsa Shirazi as Tina
- Keyvan Saketof as Shahin
- Jamshid Hosseini as Khalil Soufiani
- Peyman Moghaddami as Morteza
- Meysam Mojaveri as Hamid
- Poulad Mokhtari as Esmail

== Awards and nominations ==
Name of the award ceremony, year presented, category, nominee of the award, and the result of the nomination
Award	Year	Category	Recipient(s)	Result	Ref.
Hafez Awards	2023	Best Actor – Television Series Drama	Hadi Hejazifar	Nominated	
Hafez Awards	2023	Best Actor – Television Series Drama	Alireza Kamali	Won	
Hafez Awards	2023	Best Actor – Television Series Drama	Shahab Hosseini	Nominated	
Hafez Awards	2023	Best Actor – Television Series Drama	Mojtaba Pirzadeh	Nominated	
Hafez Awards	2023	Best Actress – Television Series Drama	Pantea Bahram	Nominated	
Hafez Awards	2023	Best Actress – Television Series Drama	Zhila Shahi	Nominated	
Hafez Awards	2023	Best Actress – Television Series Drama	Pardis Ahmadieh	Nominated	
Hafez Awards	2023	Best Director – Television Series	Jamshid Mahmoudi	Won	
Hafez Awards	2023	Best Screenplay – Television Series	Jamshid Mahmoudi, Reza Baharvand	Won	
Hafez Awards	2023	Best Television Series	Navid Mahmoudi	Won	
