= No Choice =

- Film poster
- Directed by: Reza Dormishian
- Written by: Reza Dormishian
- Produced by: Reza Dormishian
- Starring: Pardis Ahmadieh; Fatemeh Motamed Arya; Negar Javaherian
- Cinematography: Aeein Irani
- Edited by: Hayedeh Safiyari
- Music by: Kayhan Kalhor
- Release dates: November 3, 2020 (Tokyo); May 11, 2022 (Iran)
- Running time: 108 minutes
- Country: Iran
- Language: Persian
- Box office: 1.53 billion toman

No Choice (Persian: مجبوریم, romanized: Majboorim) is a 2020 Iranian drama film directed, written and produced by Reza Dormishian. The film screened for the first time at the 33rd Tokyo International Film Festival.

== Synopsis ==
The film is about three women who live in three different circumstances in Iran.

== Cast ==
- Fatemeh Motamed Arya as Dr. Mahshid Pendar
- Negar Javaherian as Sara Nedayi
- Parsa Pirouzfar as Dr. Sa'adat
- Pardis Ahmadieh as Golbahar Rezvani
- Mojtaba Pirzadeh as Mojtaba
- Bahman Farmanara as Mr. Shahriar
- Homayoun Ershadi as Hospital
- Sepideh Alimohamdi as Secretary

Manager

- Zhale Olov as Pendar's mother
- Babak Karimi as Karim
- Reza Behbudi as Interrogator
- Maryam Boubani as Aunt Safieh
- Parivash Nazarieh as Mrs. Arshad
- Mehdi Nosrati as the Jenitor
