= The Lost Prestige =

2023 Iranian television series

- Persian: حیثیت گمشده
- Genre: Drama; Thriller
- Created by: Sajad Pahlevanzadeh
- Written by: Ahmad Solgi
- Directed by: Sajad Pahlevanzadeh
- Starring: Mehdi Hosseininia; Mehdi Zaminpardaz; Behzad Khalaj; Elnaz Habibi; Amir Norouzi; Bahareh Afshari; Setareh Pesyani; Nader Fallah; Ashkan Delavari; Arash Falahatpisheh
- Music by: Masoud Sekhavatdoust
- Ending theme: "I'm Searching for Myself" by Moein Z
- Country of origin: Iran
- Original language: Persian
- No. of seasons: 1
- No. of episodes: 9

Production
- Producer: Mohammad Reza Mansouri
- Cinematography: Saman Lotfian
- Editor: Hossein Jamshidi Gohari
- Running time: 45–53 minutes

Original release
- Network: Filimo
- Release: 14 July – 8 September 2023

The Lost Prestige (Persian: حیثیت گمشده, romanized: Heysiat-e Gomshodeh) is a 2023 Iranian drama thriller television miniseries written by Ahmad Solgi and directed by Sajad Pahlevanzadeh, and starring Mehdi Hosseininia, Mehdi Zaminpardaz, Behzad Khalaj, Elnaz Habibi, Amir Norouzi, Seid Hassan Hosseinian and Bahareh Afshari. The first episode was released on Filimo on July 14, 2023.

== Plot ==
After many years, Amir (Mehdi Hosseininia) and Hajar (Bahareh Afshari) could not give birth to a child. The man's life is full of sarcasm and blame from people. Words and pressure from others have affected their marriage and they are no longer as close and happy as before. One day when Amir was at work, he gets a call from the hospital and was

== Cast ==
- Mehdi Hosseininia as Amir Aghabeigi
- Mehdi Zaminpardaz as Rasoul
- Behzad Khalaj as Esmail / Safdar Kouti
- Elnaz Habibi as Tahmineh Aghabeigi
- Amir Norouzi as Farshad
- Bahareh Afshari as Hajar Falahzadeh
- Setareh Pesyani as Soheila Zarei
- Nader Fallah as Hashem Aghabeigi
- Ashkan Delavari as Ahmad Bolour
- Seid Hassan Hosseinian as homeless person
- Arash Falahatpisheh as Saeed Rostami
