= Asphyxia (film) =

- Film poster
- Directed by: Fereydoun Jeyrani
- Written by: Fereydoun Jeyrani
- Produced by: Fereydoun Jeyrani
- Starring: Navid Mohammadzadeh; Elnaz Shakerdoust; Amir Salehian; Mahaya Petrosian; Pardis Ahmadieh
- Cinematography: Masood Salami
- Edited by: Bahram Dehghan
- Music by: Karen Homayounfar
- Release date: 1 February 2017 (Fajr)
- Running time: 107 minutes
- Country: Iran
- Language: Persian

Asphyxia (Persian: خفه‌گی) is a 2017 Iranian neo-noir film written, produced and directed by Fereydoun Jeyrani and starring Navid Mohammadzadeh, Elnaz Shakerdoust, Mahaya Petrosian and Pardis Ahmadieh.

== Plot ==
Masoud takes his wife who has neurotic tensions to the asylum to take care of her.

== Cast ==
- Navid Mohammadzadeh as Masoud Sazgar
- Amir Salehian as Kamil
- Elnaz Shakerdoust as Sahra Mashreghi
- Mahaya Petrossian as Zohre
- Pardis Ahmadieh as Nasim Sazgar
- Poulad Kimiaei as Mansour Sazgar
- Parviz Poorhosseini
- Ehsan Amani as Zohre's Husband
- Asadollah Yekta as Doctor
- Mahsa Hejazi as Nurse
