= Pars Online =

Iranian ISP acquired by Hiweb

- Industry: Internet and Telecommunication
- Genre: Internet service provider
- Founded: Tehran, Iran (1999)
- Headquarters: Tehran, Iran
- Number of locations: 28
- Area served: Iran
- Services: Internet, Bandwidth, VSAT, VoIP, VPN
- Owner: (Private Company)
- Number of employees: 750
- Website: www.parsonline.com

ParsOnline is an Iranian Internet service provider based in Tehran. Founded in 1999, and has over 750 employees. It is the largest private ISP in Iran, providing a full range of ISP services for both residential and business customers. It was acquired by Hiweb.

== Products and services ==
- ADSL Internet services
- Dialup Internet
- VSAT
- Broadband Internet
- Bandwidth
- Telephone Cards for low cost outgoing international phone calls
- Data center services
- VPN
- WiMAX based on WiMAX 802.16e standard, the first provider of this version of WiMAX in Middle East
- NOC (Network Operation Center)
- Network consultation, design and implementation

== Transfer of shares of the company ==
In March 2019, Hi Web (a publicly traded company on the Tehran Stock Exchange) purchased all the shares of Pars Online and became 100% owner of the company.

== Offices, coverage and representation ==
The head office is in central Tehran.

== Data center ==
Pars Online established the first private data center in Iran.

== Competition ==
According to a United Nations report, Pars Online, along with Afranet and Neda, are in major competition in VOIP services. Pars Online is in major competition with Afranet, Shatel, Sepanta, Neda Rayaneh, and other local ISPs.
