= Amir Jafari =

Iranian actor

- امیر جعفری
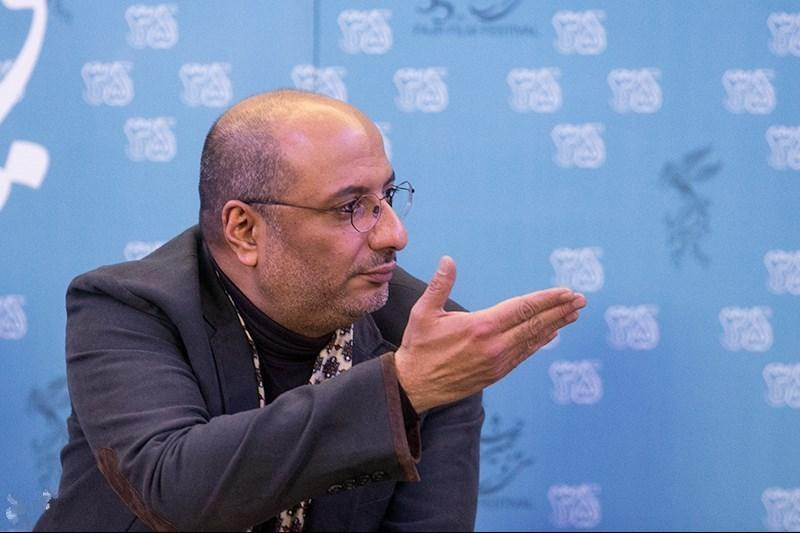
- Amir Jafari at the Milad Tower
- Born: September 1, 1974 (age 52); Tehran, Iran
- Occupation: Actor
- Years active: 2000–present
- Spouse: Rima Raminfar
- Children: 1
- Relatives: Alireza Jafari (nephew)

Amir Jafari (Persian: امیر جعفری; born September 1, 1974) is an Iranian actor.

== Personal life ==
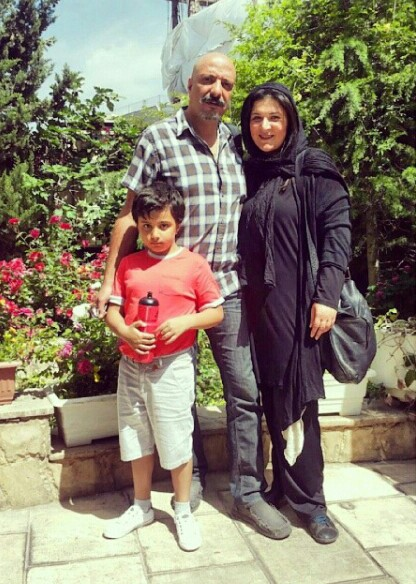
Amir Jafari and his family 2014

Jafari is married to Rima Raminfar and has one son.

== Filmography ==
=== Cinema ===
He learned acting from Hamid Samandarian (1931 - 2012), one of the most remarkable acting teachers in Iran. He has started acting in cinema since 2001. His first movie was Bread, Love, Motorcycle 1000.

=== Actor ===
Year	Movie	Role	Director	Release
2016	Conditional Release		Hossein Shahabi	
2014	Alien		-	2013
2013	Bending the Rules			
2012	Sizdah		Houman Seyyedi	
2011	Pickup on South Street		Siavash As'adi	2012
2009	Nofouzi		Ahmad Kaveri; Mehdi Fayouzi	-
2009	Keyfar		Hassan Fathi	2010
2009	Laj-o Lajbazi		Mehdi Borghei	2010
2008	Postchi se bar dar nemizanad		Hassan Fathi	2009
2009	A Non-profit Police Station		Yadollah Samadi	-
2009	Bi-pooli		Hamid Nematollah	2009
2005	Tardast		Mohammad Ali Sadjadi	2009
2005	Maxx		Saman Moghadam	-
2003	Jenayat		Mohammad Ali Sadjadi	-
2001	The Poisonous Mushroom		Rasoul Mollagholipour	-
2001	Nan-o Eshgh-o Motor-e 1000		Abolhassan Davoudi	-

=== Director assistant ===
Year	Movie	Director	Release
2001	To Live	Reza Sobhani	-
1996	Mina’s secret	Abbas Rafei	-

=== Series ===
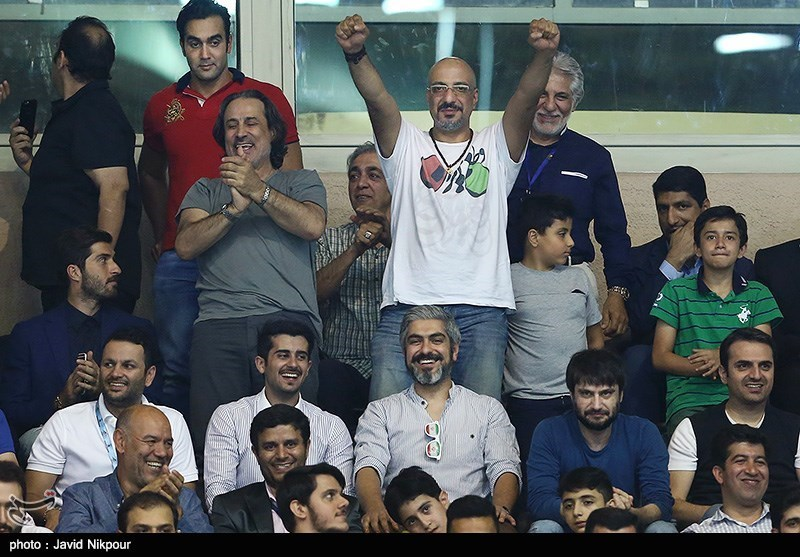
Watching 2015 World League, Iran vs United States

Year	Title	Role	Director	Network	Release
2022	Jeyran	Mirza Aqa Khan Nuri	Hassan Fathi	Filimo	2021
2017	Shahrzad	Captain Aparviz	Hassan Fathi	Lotus Play	2018
2015	Misunderstanding of a dream		Fereydun Jeyrani	IRIB 1	Summer 2015
2013	Capital season-2		Siroos Moghaddam	IRIB 1	Spring 2013
2011	Check Bargashti		Siroos Moghaddam	IRIB 1	Spring 2012
2011	Sheydai		Mohammad Mehdi Asgarpour	IRIB 3	Autumn 2011
2011	Family Plot		Rambod Javan	IRIB 2	Summer 2011
2010	Under Eight		Siroos Moghaddam	IRIB 1	Summer 2010
2010	Char Divari		Siroos Moghaddam	IRIB 1	Spring 2010
2007	The Forbidden Fruit		Hassan Fathi	IRIB 2	2007
2005	For the Last Time		Akbar Mansour-Fallah	IRIB TV5	2005
2007	Fasten our Seatbelt		Mehdi Mazloumi	IRIB 3	-
2005	I'm a Tenant		Parisa Bakhtavar	IRIB 3	-
2001	Without Description		Mehdi Mazloumi	IRIB 3	-

== Awards ==
- Best actor, Fajr International Theater Festival, 1999
- Hafez Award nomination for Best Actor – Television Series Drama for The Asphalt Jungle, 2024
