= Arash Abbasi =

Iranian playwright, director and actor

- آرش عباسی
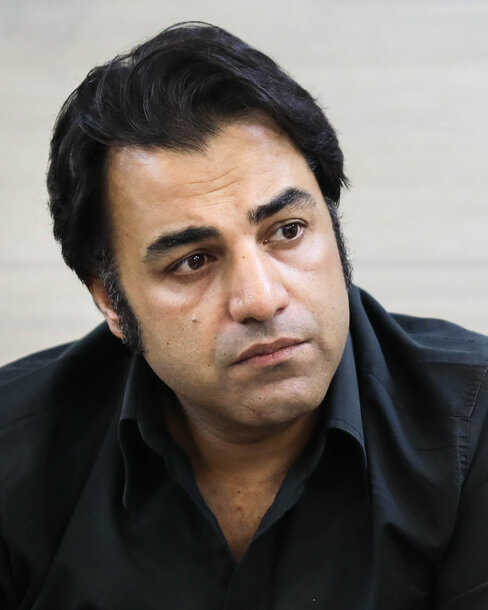
- Abbasi in 2020
- Born: Arash Abbasi; 4 January 1978 (age 48); Malayer, Imperial State of Iran
- Education: MA in The Rules of The Theater from University of Bologna
- Occupations: Screenwriter, director, actor
- Years active: 1990–present

Arash Abbasi (Persian: آرش عباسی, born in 1978 in Malayer) is an Iranian screenwriter, director and actor.

== Early life ==
Abbasi started his work in 1990 at his hometown School. In 1998 he moved to Tehran to Study Drama. He got a BA in Dramatic literature from Azad University of art and architecture. In 2012 he Went to Bologna and in university of bologna, he got his MA in The Rules of the Theatre.

== Activities ==
Abbasi has written 25 stage plays and directed 15 plays in Iran and Italy. His work Named Nevisandeh Mordeh Ast (The Writer Is Dead) has been translated to German and Italian and has been performed in different cities of Italy. He is the writer of several TV series such as Istgah-e Seh Rahi (Three-Way Station), TV Film Gharibeh (Stranger) and he was the Assistant Director of TV Series such as Tajrobeh (Experience) and Khaneh-ee Dar Tariky (The House in the Darkness). He is also the writer of Gahi (Sometimes) screenplay. He took participate in Giuseppe Tornatore Directing Workshop (2013).

Earlier in 2016, Abbasi was invited to the Italian city of Bologna to stage his play "The Lady" during an Iranian Cultural Festival Titled "Heart of Persia". Teatri di Vita, an international center for theater and contemporary arts in Bologna, was the main organizer of the festival. The Lady was also performed in Iran with Sanam Naderi as The Lady in Italian Language. In autumn 2017, Abbasi's Groupe Moj collaborated with Italian theater expert and choreographer Claudia Castellucci in a joint performance.

He was the consulter of Italian Theater Film works in 2016. In 2018 He was nominated in Fajr International Theater Festival for Best director and Best Playwright – National Competition A for the play Anna Karenina free Adapted from the famous novel Anna Karenina by the Russian author Leo Tolstoy. In 2019 he nominated at Fajr International Theater Festival for Best Playwright – Radio Plays Competition for the play written by the wind. In 2019 he also selected for 16th Sedicicorto International Film Festival jury in Italy.

In 2019 he was the writer of the Popular TV Series Paytakht SE06.

== Artistic Management records ==
Title
Relations and Information Deputy Manager of 34th Fajr Film Festival
Public Relations Manager of Isfahan International Children and Youth Theatre Festival
Public Relations Manager of Shahr (City) Theatre
Manager of News Center of Fath-e Khorramshahr Festival (Conquest of Khorramshahr Festival)
Secretary of Culture and Art Service of International News
Head of Malayer Theatre

== Stage plays ==
Year	Title	notes
1999	A bucket of curse for Mrs. Shamsi	Writer and director
2001	The 50th Kilometer	Writer and director
2003	The Popular Story	Writer and director
2004	Moving Blood in Dried veins	
2005	Written By the Wind	
2005	The Red Quote	
2005	The Basement	Writer and director
2006	No Men is Allowed	Writer and director
2006	No Women is Allowed	Writer and director
2008	The Lady, La Signora	Writer and director
2008	The Stranger	Writer and director
2008	Paternal	
2009	Sharp Turn	
2009	Every thing about Mr.F	Writer and director
2010	The Sun Shines from Milan	Writer and director
2011	The lobby	
2011	Catch me if you can	
2012	The Writer is Dead	Writer and director
2015	The Winged Love	
2015	Fathers, Mothers, Children	Writer and director
2017	Anna Karenina	Writer and director
2019	Molin rouge	
2019	The Party	Writer and director

== Scripts ==
Year	Title	Role	Notes
2018	Bologna	Writer and Director and producer	Italy, Short Film
2018	legal	Writer and producer	Iran, Short Film
2019	French Connection	Writer and Director and producer	Italy, Short Film
2020	The capital Season 6 TV series	Writer	Iran,15 Episodes

== See also ==
- Wikipedia Farsi
