= Rona, Azim's Mother =

2018 film

- Film poster
- Directed by: Jamshid Mahmoudi
- Written by: Jamshid Mahmoudi
- Produced by: Navid Mahmoudi
- Starring: Mohsen Tanabandeh; Mojtaba Pirzadeh; Fereshteh Hosseini; Saeed Changizian
- Release date: 6 October 2018 (BIFF)
- Running time: 89 minutes
- Country: Afghanistan
- Language: Persian

Rona, Azim's Mother is a 2018 Persian-language Afghan drama film written and directed by Jamshid Mahmoudi and produced by his brother Navid Mahmoudi. It was selected as the Afghan entry for the Best Foreign Language Film at the 91st Academy Awards, but it was not nominated.

== Cast ==
- Mohsen Tanabandeh as Azim
- Mojtaba Pirzadeh as Faroogh
- Saeed Changizian as Hashem
- Fatemeh Hosseini as Rona
- Fereshteh Hosseini as Hengameh
- Fatemeh Mirzaei as Asemeh
- Alireza Ostadi as Fazel

== See also ==
- List of submissions to the 91st Academy Awards for Best Foreign Language Film
- List of Afghan submissions for the Academy Award for Best Foreign Language Film
