= Bahareh Kian Afshar =

Iranian actor

- بهاره کیان‌افشار
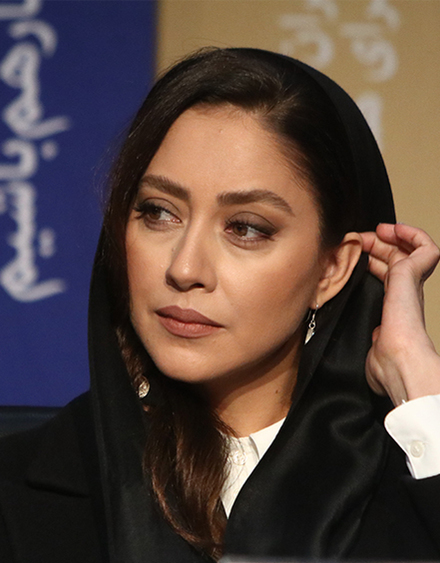
- Kian Afshar in 2020
- Born: May 2, 1983 (age 42); Tehran, Iran
- Education: Bachelor of Science in Computer Software Engineering
- Occupation: Actress
- Years active: 2006–present

Bahareh Kianafshar (Persian: بهاره کیان‌افشار; born May 2, 1983) is an Iranian actor. She began her professional acting career in 2006 with the television series Kolah Pahlavi, portraying the character "Shadi Mostasharnia", with her voice dubbed by Fariba Ramezanpour. This role brought her significant recognition. She received nominations for the Hafez Award for her performances in the series Asheghaneh (2016–2017) and Golshifteh (2017–2018).

== Early life ==
Bahareh Kianafshar was born on 2 May 1983 in Tehran, Iran. She was introduced to theatre during her primary school years, but her parents were not supportive of her pursuing acting as a career. During high school, she aspired to attend a theatre school and study arts, but her parents opposed this, preferring that she pursue a medical education. Uninterested in the sciences, Kianafshar opted for a diploma in mathematics and physics and later studied computer engineering at university.

In 2004, at the age of 19 and while still a university student, Kianafshar joined the theatre group led by Azita Hajian, where she trained in physical movement, tone, and expression. In 2006, through an introduction by her high school classmate Tina Pakravan, she secured the role of Shadi Mostasharnia in Kolah Pahlavi. In 2008, she made her cinematic debut in the film Shirin, directed by Abbas Kiarostami.

== Health Ambassador for Behnam Dehshpour Charity ==
Kianafshar has been a long-time volunteer and active supporter of the Behnam Dehshpour Charity Institute. In 2015, during the charity's year-end celebration, she was appointed as the Health Ambassador for the institute.

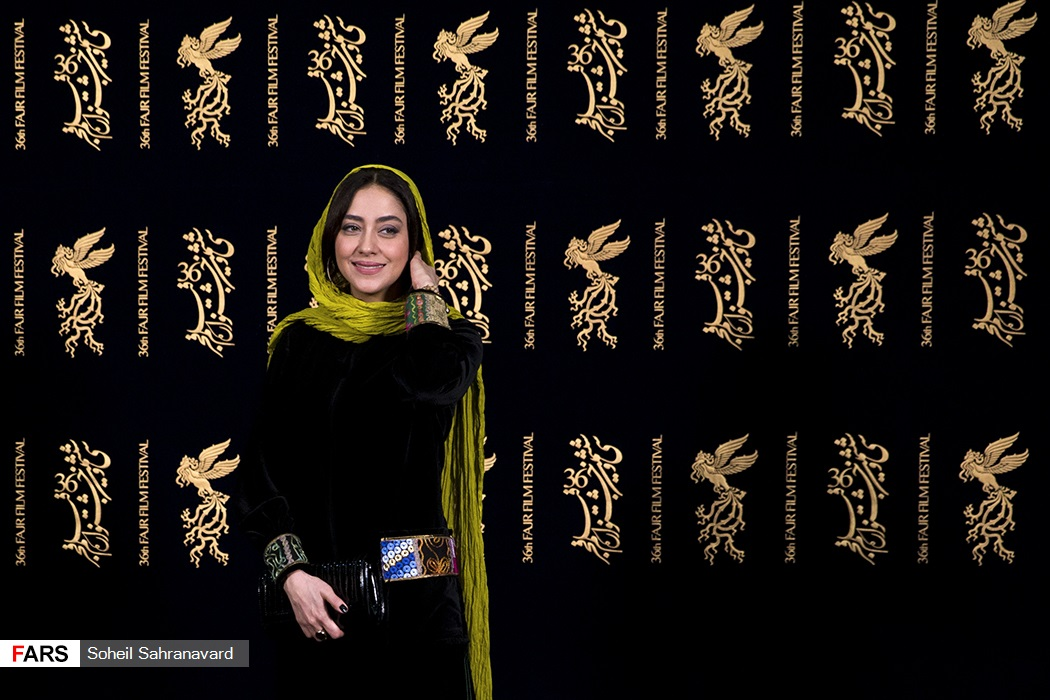
Press conference for the film "Mahura" on the seventh day of the Fajr Film Festival

== Consideration for Lead Role in the Controversial Film Laleh ==
During the 2012 Fajr Film Festival, the producers of the controversial film Laleh (based on the life of Laleh Seddigh, an Iranian motorsport champion) announced that Kianafshar had been selected for the lead role. However, it was later reported in some media outlets that her selection was canceled due to her limited proficiency in English. Mahnaz Afshar was also previously considered for the role. Ultimately, Sara Amiri was chosen as the lead actress for Laleh.

== Songwriting ==
Kianafshar wrote the lyrics for the song "To Hasti," performed by Bahram Radan. The music video for the song was released in 2013.

- She also wrote the lyrics for five tracks on Radan's album The Other Side.

== Filmography ==
=== Cinema ===
Year	Title	Director
2024	Moses, Friend of God: At the Time of Dawn	Ebrahim Hatamikia
2023	Don't Be Shy 2: Ghanbar's Separation from Sanam	Reza Maghsoudi
2021	Namour	Davood Bidel
2021	Glass House	Amir Pourkian
2021	Kosovo	Meysam Hashemi Taba
2020	Duet Song	Arezoo Arzanesh
2019	Dog Leash	Mehran Ahmadi
2019	Black Cat	Karim Amini
2019	Silver Man	Mohammad Hossein Latifi
2019	Boy Killer	Mohammad Hadi Karimi
2019	Sohrab's Dream	Ali Ghavitan
2018	Weightless	Mehdi Fard Ghaderi
2018	Camel Coat	Mehdi Ali Mirzaei
2017	Hot Scent	Ali Ebrahimi
2017	Woman's Enemy	Karim Amini
2017	Hornet's Nest	Borzoo Niknejad
2016	Mahoura	Hamid Zargarnezhad
2016	Human Comedy	Mohammad Hadi Karimi
2016	Yellow	Mostafa Taghizadeh
2015	Barcode	Mostafa Kiaei
2015	Where Are My Shoes?	Kiumars Pourahmad
2014	Ayn Shin Ghaf	Ghasem Jafari
2014	Wavelength	Faramarz Shahbazian
2012	Nowhere, Nobody	Ebrahim Sheibani
2012	Sinners	Faramarz Gharibian
2008	Shirin	Abbas Kiarostami

=== Television ===
Year	Title	Director
2017	Yellow Tape	Pouria Azarbaijani
2014	Sometimes Look Back	Maziar Miri
2004–2010	Pahlavi Hat	Seyed Ziaeddin Dari

=== Web ===
Year	Title	Director
2025	Don't Be Shy	Reza Maghsoudi
2024	Aban	Reza Dadoui
2024	Exile	Amir Pourkian
2023	Turkish Coffee	Alireza Amini
2021	Soda	Iman Yazdi
2021	Professional	Mostafa Taghizadeh
2020	I Want to Stay Alive	Shahram Shah Hosseini
2018	Hashtag Aunt Cockroach	Mohammad Moslemi
2017	Golshifteh	Behrooz Shoeibi
2016	Passionate	Manouchehr Hadi

=== Short films ===
Year	Title	Director
2017	Secret Presence of an Alien	Elham Atyabi
2014	Take a Seat Darling	Ali Nazari
2004	Secret of the Little Red Fish	Pouria Jahanshad

== Theatre ==
Year	Title	Director
2012	Crows and Lies	Abbas Ghaffari
2012	Inspector Hound Real	Bourjin Abdolrazaghi
2013	Scent of Coffee, Corn, and Kebab	Ehsan Karami
2014	WOW	Tino Salehi
2015	The Untouchables	Alireza Koushk Jalali
2015	Hotel Guests	Hamidreza Azarang
2017	Iceland	Aida Keykhaei

=== Stage reading ===
Year	Title	Director
2016	Hair	Ehsan Karami
2016	One Minute of Silence	Mohammad Yaghoubi
2017	Scenes from My Father's Life	Afshin Akhlaghi

== Awards and honors ==
Award	Category	Film	Result	Source
14th Hafez Awards	Best Actress in Television Drama	Pahlavi Hat	Nominated	
17th Hafez Awards	Best Actress in Television Drama	Passionate	Nominated	
19th Hafez Awards	Best Actress in Television Comedy	Golshifteh	Nominated	
