= Shatel =

Iranian Internet service provider

Coordinates: 35°46′49.96″N 51°26′9.30″E

Shatel Information & Communication Technology Group
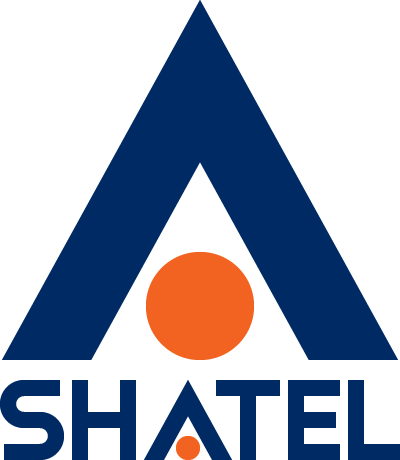
- Company type: Private
- Industry: Telecommunications
- Founded: 1999; 27 years ago
- Headquarters: Tehran, Iran
- Area served: Iran nationwide
- Key people: Ahmadreza Nakhjavani, the company CEO
- Products: Fixed high-speed internet VDSL, ADSL2+ - High-speed fiber optic internet - New generation High-speed internet TD-LTE - Fixed telephone services - Mobile internet 2G, 3G, 4G, 4.5G, Full MVNO
- Services: ADSL2+, VDSL, VoIP, VPN, Broadband, IPTV, Colocation, FTTX, Mobile Internet- MVNO, TD-LTE
- Number of employees: 1200 in Tehran; 500 customer support 700 engineers the countrywide
- Parent: Shatel mobile, Namava
- Website: www.shatel.ir

Shatel is an Iranian Internet service provider and a "large" Local Internet registry based in Tehran, Iran . Shatel is the first ADSL2+ service provider in the country, and the first gigabit wireless network operator based on registered microwave frequency.

== History ==
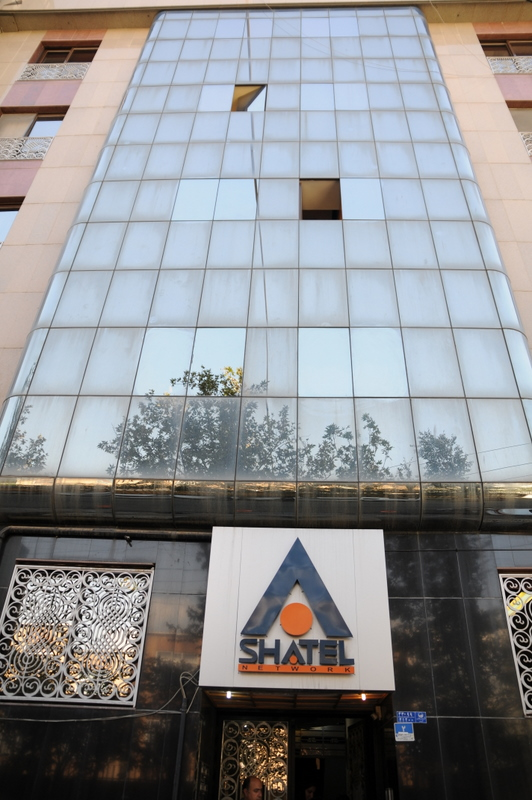
Shatel Headquarters office at Tehran, Iran

Shatel Group launched in 2002 after acquiring the ISP and ICP licenses from the Ministry of Information and Communication Technology of Iran, starting with a 20-personnel team. In one year the formation of the "radio services regulation" in the country, Shatel Group acquired Telecommunication Company of Iran’s PAP license.

After acquiring the licenses, Shatel invested in high-speed ADSL2+ Internet access and the related supplementary services such as VPN, VOD, and VODSL, as well as a network infrastructure for e-learning. With the expansion of the Group’s activities, various services and products were added to the Shatel basket, such as broadband in the forms of leased lines and wireless, as well as special LAN and MAN connection setup solutions for organizations.

In September 2011, Shatel was awarded as one of the VoIP termination routes to Iran by Telecommunication Infrastructure Company of Iran.

== Products and services ==
- ADSL2+
- VPN
- VoDSL (Voice over DSL)
- Video on Demand (VoD)
- Content Hosting and setting up the network infrastructure for e-learning
- Broadband services:
  - Wireless Internet
  - G.SHDSL
  - point to point connection setups
- Dialup Internet
- VoIP
- Wireless network solutions for backhauling and Last mile, utilizing microwave equipment
- Kaspersky Anti-Virus Premier Business Reseller
- Training services in "Shatel Education and Research Center".

Shatel was one of the first companies in Iran to be awarded a Private Access Provider license (allowing them to deploy ADSL). Shatel ADSL2+ services are enabled in about 450 Telephone Centers national wide with about 80 Telephone Centers in Tehran.

Besides the services mentioned above, the Shatel Group of companies is the exclusive premium partner of ZyXEL manufacturer in Iran.

== Achievements ==
- Top data communication operator in first Information and Communication Technology National Festival (FAVA)
- Top data communication operator in their second consequent year and receiving golden statue and certificate from Ministry of Communication and information technology
- First rank among information technology service providers in their third consequent year in Information and Communication Technology National Festival (FAVA)
- "Matma" (Iranian Centre for National Internet Development) reported Shatel as one of 4 best service providers in Iran in 2010.
- "Three-Star Award" for the establishment of EFQM (European Foundation for Quality Management) from the Industry, Mine and Trade Minister
- Diamond statue and 1st rank among all of IT corporations in Iran
- Among 4 fastest service providers up to Nov 2011 according to Mamta statistics.
- Receiving ISO 9001 certificate from IMQ in Feb 2012.
- Receiving National Quality Award (ICTINQA).
- Receiving three-star testimonial from Iranian Minister of Industry, Mine and Trade
- Receiving ISO 14001:2004 certificate

== Offices and coverage ==
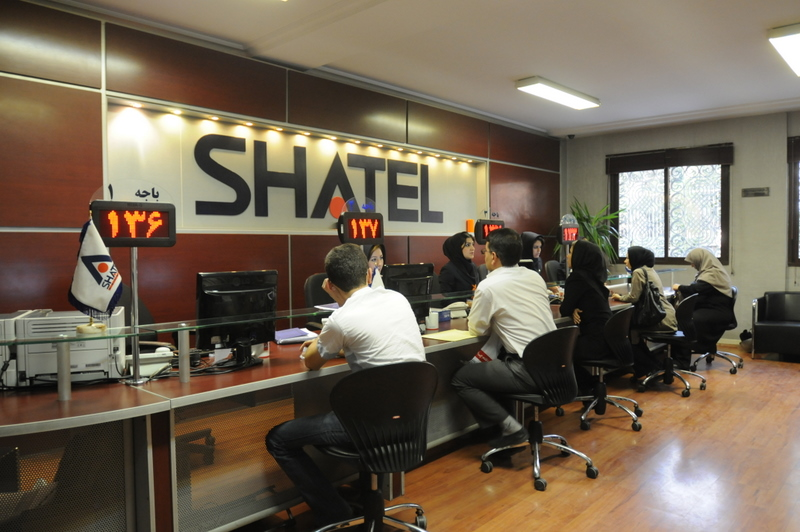
Shatel Customer Support Department at central office

The head office is in northern Tehran, with representatives and local branches around the country.

== Organization ==
The Headquarters office in Tehran has 800 employees with 160 in the customer support department. Nationwide employees include about 1200 with about 400 engineers. Headquarter office has departments like market R&D, technical R&D, quality management, product marketing and training. This company has also relationships with Iranian universities for their employee training courses.

== Competition ==
Shatel is in major competition with Afranet, ParsOnline, Sepanta, Neda Rayaneh and other local ISPs
