= Sepanta =

Sepanta Communication Development Co.
- Company type: Private
- Genre: Internet service provider
- Founded: 1998
- Headquarters: Tehran, Iran
- Area served: Iran
- Number of employees: 146
- Website: www.sepanta.com

Sepanta Communication Development (Persian: سپنتا) is an Iranian Internet service provider. This private company has been held in 1998 by providing dial-up Internet for home users in Tehran. Sepanta is a medium Local Internet registry Sepanta expanding its services to keep its position as the best Iranian profile-based service provider.

== Offices and Coverage ==
Sepanta has five offices at the following cities: Esfahan, Pardis, Shiraz, Tabriz and Yazd.

== Achievements ==
Sepanta website achieved first place among Internet service provider websites in 4th Iranian Web Festival.

== Competition ==
According to United Nations' report on Post Report of Iran, ParsOnline along with Afranet and Neda are in major competition in VOIP services and Sepanta raised into competition later. Sepanta is in major competition with Afranet, ParsOnline, Shatel and Neda Rayaneh and other local ISPs
