= Red Nail Polish =

- Film poster
- Directed by: Seyyed Jamal Seyyed Hatami
- Screenplay by: Amir Abdi
- Produced by: Kamran Majidi
- Starring: Pardis Ahmadieh; Pantea Panahiha; Behnam Tashakkor
- Cinematography: Mohammad Reza Sokoot
- Edited by: Hamid Najafi Rad
- Release date: 1 December 2016
- Running time: 85 minutes
- Country: Iran
- Language: Persian
- Box office: 1.2 billion toman

Red Nail Polish (Persian: لاک قرمز, romanized: Lake Ghermez) is a 2016 Iranian film directed by Seyyed Jamal Seyyed Hatami. The film was selected to attend the New Look at the 34th Fajr Film Festival and was nominated for Best Director and Best Film in the New Look of the Festival. It was released on December 11, 2016 in Iran theatrically.

== Premise ==
Akram is a sixteen-year-old girl who must struggle with financial and social problems in her life when the world shows her its ugly face. Arsalan, Akram's father, is addicted to drugs and beats his wife; but he loves making wooden dolls. When Arsalan dies, the family faces many problems. Azam, Mother of the family, wants to send Akram to Arak, but she doesn't accept it.

== Cast ==
- Pardis Ahmadieh as Akram
- Pantea Panahiha as Azam
- Behnam Tashakkor as Arsalan
- Masoud Keramati as Uncle Vali

== Release ==
Red Nail Polish was released on February 1, 2016 to February 11 at some Tehran cinemas in the Fajr International Film Festival. It was released on December 11, 2016 in Iran theatrically.

== Awards and nominations ==
- Best Supporting Actress (Pantea Panahiha) at the Iranian Cinema Celebration
- Best Actress Award nominee (Pardis Ahmadieh) at the Iranian Cinema Celebration
- Best Film nominee for New Look at the Fajr Film Festival
