= Behnam Bani =

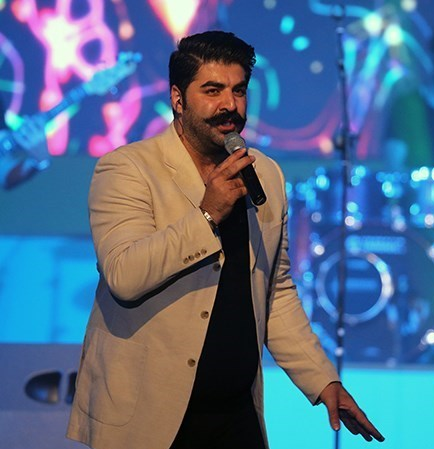

Background information
- Born: October 1, 1987 (age 38)
- Years active: 2011–present

Behnam Bani is an Iranian singer born in 1987 and started his career in 2005 with the song "Ashqem Kordeh" and "Alagheh Khas" being his most famous works.

In 2017 Behnam Bani would hold his first concert after 6 years of being in the music industry.

In 2019 Behman Bani was not active in composing his own music but would still be holding concerts. A vast majority of his songs were composed by himself except for a few composed by Hamed Baradaran.
