= Picture World =

Iranian film magazine

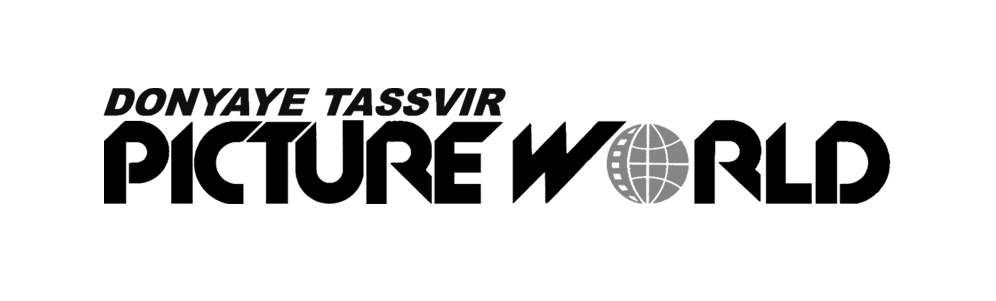
- Editor-in-Chief: Omid Moallem
- Executive Manager: Azar Memarian
- Categories: Film
- Frequency: Monthly
- Founder: Ali Moallem
- Founded: 1992
- First issue: February 1993; 33 years ago
- Country: Iran
- Based in: Tehran
- Language: Persian
- Website: dtonline.ir

Picture World is an Iranian film magazine published monthly by Donyaye Tassvir Publication in Tehran, Iran. It was founded in 1992 by Ali Moallem. From the first issue in February 1993 until issue No. 272 in March 2017, the magazine was edited by Ali Moallem. After his death in March, it is published by his son, Omid Moallem.

In March 2008 Picture World was temporarily closed by the Press Monitoring Committee of Iran. The magazine organizes the Hafez Awards.

== See also ==
- Hafez Awards
