= Morteza Farshbaf =

Iranian filmmaker

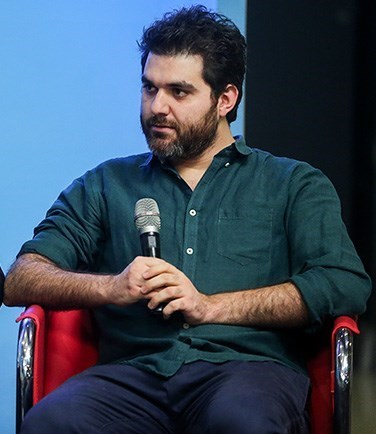
- Farshbaf in 2014
- Born: 1986 (age 39–40); Gonbad Kavus, Golestan, Iran
- Occupations: Film director; screenwriter
- Years active: 2006–present

Morteza Farshbaf (Persian: مرتضی فرشباف, born 1986) is an Iranian film director and screenwriter. He earned a Crystal Simorgh nomination for Best Director for Tooman (2020).

== Filmography ==
=== Film ===
Year	Title	Director	Writer	Notes
2007	The Wind Blows Wherever it Wants	Yes	Yes	Short Film
2007	Praise	No	No	as Cinematographer
2011	Mourning	Yes	Yes	
2015	Avalanche	Yes	Yes	
2016	Duet	No	No	as Actor
2020	Tooman	Yes	Yes	

=== Documentary ===
Year	Title	Director	Writer	Notes
2012	White Tree	Yes	No	
2010	Chasing Che	No	No	as Editor

== Awards and nominations ==
Year	Award	Category	Nominated work	Result
2020	Fajr Film Festival	Best Director	Tooman	Nominated
2021	Hafez Awards	Best Director – Motion Picture	Tooman	Nominated
2021	Hafez Awards	Best Screenplay – Motion Picture	Tooman	Nominated
2011	Busan International Film Festival	New Currents Award	Mourning	Won
2011	Busan International Film Festival	FIPRESCI Award	Mourning	Won
2012	Deauville Asian Film Festival	Best Film	Mourning	Won
2012	Deauville Asian Film Festival	Critic's Prize - Special Mention	Mourning	Won
2011	Tallinn Black Nights Film Festival	Netpac Award	Mourning	Won
2015	Tallinn Black Nights Film Festival	Grand Prize	Avalanche	Nominated
2020	Tallinn Black Nights Film Festival	Grand Prize	Tooman	Nominated
2022	Agrandisman Awards	Agrandisman Unique Award	Morteza Farshbaf	Won
2022	Iran's Film Critics and Writers Association	Best Director	Tooman	Nominated
2022	Iran's Film Critics and Writers Association	Best Screenplay	Tooman	Nominated
