= Mohammad Aghebati =

Iranian theater director and actor

- Born: 1975 (age 50–51); Mashhad, Iran
- Education: Tehran University of Art, Brooklyn College
- Known for: Theater director, scenic design, actor

Mohammad Aghebati (Persian: محمد عاقبتی, born: 1975) is an Iranian theater director, scenic designer and actor. He has staged numerous dramas during his career, including Oedipus the King by Sophocles, AKA Jocasta; God’s Dead Words, Hamlet, The Prince of Grief by William Shakespeare, and Kiss You and Tears by Václav Havel.

Aghebati graduated from Tehran University of Art majoring in theater directing in 2000. Upon graduation, he became a member of the Leev Theater Group. After departure from Leev Theatre Group, he moved to New York and started a special research fellowship at Yale University, School of Drama. He then followed his education by obtaining his M.F.A in Performance and Media Arts at Brooklyn College, New York.

Agehbati is the co-founder and artistic director of Maaa Theater which is currently active in New York and Tehran.

== Career ==
=== Director and set designer ===
- Apart-Ment @ African American Arts and Culture Complex, New York, NY
- The Little Black Fish @ Madison Square Park Children Festival(2018), New York, NY
- Where Do We Come From? @ Art House (2018), Tehran, Iran
- King Lear @ Iranshahr Theater (2017), Tehran, Iran
- The Little Black Fish @ Downtown Arts (2016), New York, NY
- Blackout @ Charles Eisemann Center (2016), Dallas, TX
- I Was King Richard (Based on Shakespeare’s Richard II) @ Tehran International Fadjr Theater Festival (2016), Tehran, Iran
- Hamlet, Prince of Grief @ Under The Radar, Public Theater (2013), New York, NY
- Opera Mani & Mana @Vahdat hall, world children (2012), Tehran, Iran
- Skellig and Children of the Fly (Based on “Skellig” by David Almond) By Mehdi Kushki @ City Theater (2012), Tehran, Iran
- Woman from the Past @ City Theater (2012), Tehran, Iran
- Simorgh (Based on Attar's Conference of the Birds) @ Vahdat Hall for Universal children Day (2011), Tehran, Iran
- Childhood Songs @Iranshahr Theater (2011), Tehran, Iran
- Peter Avhh Testimony @ Khorram Abad Theater (2010), Khorramabad, Iran
- Arash (Based on “The Book Of Kings”) @Vahdat hall, World Children Day (2010), Tehran, Iran
- Voice Room By Reza Soroor @ Leev Theater (2010), Tehran, Iran
- The Sky of Snowy Days (Based on “Bonnie & Clyde” script by Robert Benton and David Newman) By Mohammad Charmshir @ City Theater (2009), Tehran, Iran
- Only God Has the Right to Wake Me Up (Based on "Oscar and the lady in Pink" by Éric-Emmanuel Schmitt) By Mohammad Charmshir (2008), Tehran, Iran
- Jocasta; or God’s Dead Words (2008), Tokyo, Japan
- Only God Has the Right to Wake Me Up (Based on "Oscar and the lady in Pink" by Éric-Emmanuel Schmitt) By Mohammad Charmshir (2006), Berlin, Germany
- Raiders to the Sea by J.M Synge @ Iran National TV (2006), Tehran, Iran
- I Have to Go, I am Too Late (based on a novel by Patrick Modiano) by Mohammad Charmshir (2005), Tehran, Iran
- Kiss You and Tears (based on Václav Havel's letters) by Mohammad Charmshir (2003), Heidelberg, Germany
- The Maids By Jean Genet @ Fadjr Theater Festival (2001), Tehran, Iran
- Purgatory By William Butler Yeats @ Fadjr Theater Festival (2000), Tehran, Iran

=== Honors, awards and nominations ===
- Best Director and Set Design from Hamedan International Theater for Children and Youth 2018
- Brooklyn Art Council Grant for The Little Black Fish 2018
- NYSCA grant for The Little Black Fish 2017
- LabWorks Artist @ New Victory Theater for The Little Black Fish 2016
- Nominated for the Best Children performance @ The National Critiques Circle for Skellig and Children of Fly, 2013
- Nominated for the Best Designer @ The National Critiques Circle for Skellig and Children of Fly, 2013
- Won Best Director @15th International Festival of Theater for Children & Youth, Isfahan – Iran Only God has the Right to Wake me Up, 2008
- Nominated for the best Set and costume Design @15th International Festival of Theater for Children & Youth, Isfahan – Iran, Only God has the Right to Wake me Up, 2008
- Won Best Director @ 22nd International Fadjr Theatre Festival, Tehran Kiss You and Tears, 2004
- Won Best Performance @22nd International Fadjr Theatre Festival, Tehran Kiss You and Tears 2004
- Awarded the Medal of Honor from President Khatami as Iran’s successful Young Theater Artist for his direction of Kiss You and Tears, 2004
- Won Best Director @20th International Fadjr Student Theatre Festival, Tehran The Maids, 2002
- Won Best Performance @20th International Fadjr Student Theatre Festival, Tehran, The Maids, 2002
- Won Best Director @18th International Fadjr Student Theatre Festival, Tehran Purgatory, 2000
- Won Best Performance @18th International Fadjr Student Theatre Festival Purgatory, 2000
