= Namava =

Iranian video-on-demand streaming service

- Official logo of Namava
- Native name: نماوا
- Company type: Private
- Website type: Video-on-demand
- Available in: Persian, English
- Founded: March 2014
- Headquarters: Tehran, Iran
- Country of origin: Iran
- Key people: Mohammad Hassan Shanesaz (CEO)
- Parent: Shatel
- Website: www.namava.ir
- Registration: Required
- Current status: Active

Namava (Persian: نماوا) is an Iranian video-on-demand streaming service operated by the Shatel Group. The service provides access to Iranian and international films, television series, and animated content through an online subscription-based platform.

Namava was launched by Shatel in late 2013 and early 2014. Initially, the service was focused on Shatel internet subscribers, but it was later expanded to customers of other Iranian internet service providers.

In May 2025, Namava was blocked after broadcasting the television series Suvashun without the required permission. The service was restored in June 2025 after approximately two weeks, and Namava extended users' subscriptions by two weeks as compensation for the interruption.

== History ==
Namava originally operated under the name Movieland as part of Shatel's entertainment portal, Shatelland. In April 2016, the website was renamed Namava.

The platform released its first exclusive original series, Years Away from Home, on 20 April 2019.

Namava has also partnered with several Iranian internet service providers to provide selected content free of charge to their subscribers.

The service operates a blog featuring reviews and articles about films and television series.

== Features ==
Namava provides dedicated pages for films and television series, including information such as directors, writers, cast members, release year, genre, IMDb ratings, cover images, screenshots, and Persian-language summaries of the content.

The service also operates a subdomain for streaming selected content through Rubika, a platform operated by the Mobile Telecommunication Company of Iran.

== Original productions ==
Namava has released a number of original productions, including:

- Siavash
- Rooz-e Bolva
- The Frog
- Professional
- Gisu
- Hamrefigh
- Khosoof
- Khatoon
- Mehmouni
- Nobat-e Leili
- Women's Secret Network
- The Translator
- Anten
- Sargijeh
- Scorpion in Love
- Da Vincis
- Partner in Crime
- My Doppelgänger
- Concertino
- Asphalt Jungle
- Occasion
- Ghorbat
- Azazil
- Div-o Mah Pishooni 2
- Suvashun

== Co-distributed productions ==
Namava has co-distributed several Iranian series with Filimo, including:

- Hamgonah
- Dracula
- Heyula
- Years Away from Home
- Aghazadeh
- Once Upon a Time on Mars
- Mannequin
- Del
- Asheghaneh
- Actor
- The Magician
- How Many Springs Are Left in a Lifetime?

== Film production ==
Namava co-financed the Iranian film World War III (2022) alongside Namaagahi. The film received international recognition and won awards at several film festivals, including the Venice International Film Festival and the Tokyo International Film Festival.

Namava also co-financed the feature film Qeyf.
