= Jamshid Mahmoudi =

Afghan filmmaker (born 1983)

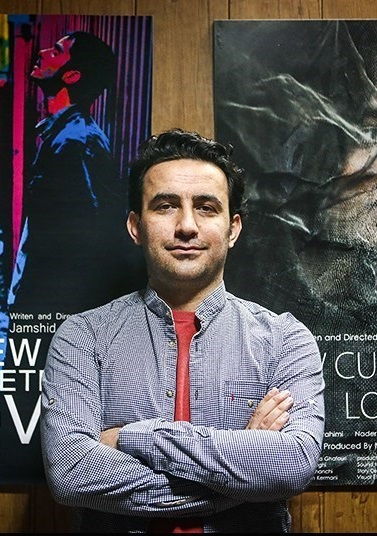
- Mahmoudi in 2015
- Born: January 3, 1983 (age 43); Parwan, Afghanistan
- Occupations: Film director; screenwriter; film producer; editor
- Years active: 2010–present
- Relatives: Navid Mahmoudi (brother)

Jamshid Mahmoudi (Persian: جمشید محمودی, born 1983) is an Afghan film director, screenwriter, producer and editor. Mahmoudi is best known for writing and directing A Few Cubic Meters of Love (2014), Rona, Azim's Mother (2018), and The Lion Skin (2022–2023). In 2023, he earned two Hafez Awards for The Lion Skin.

== Early life ==
Mahmoudi was born in 1983 in Parvan, Afghanistan. He is the brother of filmmaker Navid Mahmoudi.

== Filmography ==
=== Film ===
Year	Title	Director	Screenwriter	Producer	Notes
2014	A Few Cubic Meters of Love	Yes	Yes	No	
2016	Parting	No	Yes	Yes	Also as editor
2018	Rona, Azim's Mother	Yes	Yes	No	Also as editor
2019	Seven and a Half	No	No	Yes	
2020	Drowning in Holy Water	No	No	Yes	
2023	The Last Birthday	No	No	Yes	

=== Web series ===
Year	Title	Director	Screenwriter	Producer	Platform	Notes
2022–2023	The Lion Skin	Yes	Yes	No	Filmnet	24 episodes
2026–	Yal	Yes	Yes	No	Filmnet	

=== Television ===
Year	Title	Director	Screenwriter	Network	Notes
2010	It Could Be the Last One	Yes	Yes	IRIB TV5	Television film
2017–2018	Awning	Yes	Yes	IRIB TV2	50 episodes
2019	Sweetheart	Yes	No	IRIB TV2	32 episodes
