= Hafez Awards =

Annual awards ceremony honoring cinematic achievements in Iranian cinema

- Awarded for: Excellence in cinematic achievements
- Country: Iran
- Presented by: Picture world
- First award: 1997
- Final award: 21 November 2024

Highlights
- Most awards: "Asghar Farhadi" & "Mehran Modiri"
- Website: Hafez Awards Official website

Television/radio coverage
- Produced by: "Omid Moallem"

Hafez Awards (Persian: جایزه حافظ) is an annual awards ceremony that honors achievements in Iranian cinema. The awards, first presented in 1997, are presented by Picture World Magazine (Aka. Donyaye Tassvir in Persian) which is why they are also known as Donyaye Tassvir Awards. It is the only non-governmental ceremony among the cinematic festivals and awards held in Iran. Mehran Modiri and Asghar Farhadi with 9 Hafez statues each have jointly been the most frequent recipients of this award.

The 20th Hafez Awards were held online due to the COVID-19 pandemic.

== Background ==
Ali Moallem, Picture World founder and previous editor, established the awards in mid-'90s when Iranian cinema was under heavy governmental dominance. Watching Iranian cinema developing presence and success in international film festivals, he thought over creating an independent film award in order to honor filmmakers without political considerations and also to make a connection between film stars and the people. First ceremony was held in 1997 under the title "Hafez" after Iranian great poet Khwāja Shams-ud-Dīn Muḥammad Ḥāfeẓ-e Shīrāzi. The award is a typographical statue resembling Persian written form of the word "Hafez". as of 2016, sixteen Hafez Awards ceremonies has been held through the years.

== Categories ==
Awards are a set of 24 statues and a medal as follows:

=== Motion picture awards ===
- Best Motion Picture
- Best Director – Motion Picture
- Best Actor – Motion Picture (2 awards)
- Best Actress– Motion Picture (2 awards)
- Best Screenplay – Motion Picture (both original and adapted)
- Best Cinematography – Motion Picture
- Best Original Score – Motion Picture
- Best Original Song – Motion Picture and Television Series
- Best Editor – Motion Picture
- Best Documentary – Motion Picture
- Best Technical-Artistic Achievement
- Best Special Individual Achievement
- Abbas Kiarostami Memorial Medal (since 2016)
- Lifetime Achievement Award
- Cinematic Literature Achievement Award
- Jury Prize
- Best Stuntman (since 2021)

=== Television awards ===
- Best Television Series
- Best Director – Television Series
- Best Screenplay – Television Series
- Best Actor – Television Series Comedy
- Best Actress – Television Series Comedy
- Best Actor – Television Series Drama
- Best Actress – Television Series Drama
- Best Television Figure

Winners are chosen by a 9-membered jury including Picture World writers and critics. The nominees are selected from the movies and TV series which are screened in a single Iranian year (21 March – 20 March).
