= Marrakech International Film Festival Awards =

Marrakech International Film Festival المهرجان الدولي للفيلم بمراكش ⴰⵏⵎⵓⴳⴳⴰⵔ ⴰⴳⵔⴰⵖⵍⴰⵏ ⵏ ⵍⴼⵉⵍⵎ ⴳ ⵎⵕⵕⴰⴽⵛ
- Location: Marrakesh, Morocco
- Founded: 2001
- Awards: Golden Star/Grand Prize
- Festival date: November 29 to December 7, 2024
- Language: Arabic; Amazigh; French; English
- Website: marrakech-festival.com

During its closing ceremony, the Marrakech International Film Festival (FIFM) issues awards among the following to the best films, filmmakers and actors in the competition. These awards may or may not be issued every year.

== Golden Star (Étoile d'or)/Grand prix ==
Year	Film	Director(s)	Nationality of Director (at time of film's release)
2001	Inch'Allah Dimanche	Yamina Benguigui	France
2002	Go	Isao Yukisada	Japan
2003	Gori vatra	Pjer Zalica	Bosnia and Herzegovina
2004	Sideways	Alexander Payne	United States
2005	Saratan	Ernest Abdyshaparov	Kyrgyzstan
2006	The Red Cockatoo	Dominik Graf	Germany
2007	Autumn Ball	Veiko Õunpuu	Estonia
2008	Wild Field (Dikoe Pole)	Mikhail Kalatozov	Russia
2009	Norteado	Rigoberto Pérezcano	Mexico
2010	The Journals of Musan	Park Jung-bum	South Korea
2011	Out of Bounds	Frederikke Aspöck	Denmark
2012	The Attack	Ziad Doueiri	Lebanon
2013	Han Gong-ju	Lee Su-jin	South Korea
2014	Corrections Class	Ivan I. Tverdovsky	Russia Germany
2015	Very Big Shot	Mir-Jean Bou Chaaya	Lebanon
2016	The Donor	Zang Qiwu	China
2018	Joy	Sudabeh Mortezai	Austria Iran
2019	Valley of Souls	Nicolás Rincón Gille	Colombia
2022	A Tale of Shemroon	Emad Aleebrahim Dehkordi	Iran
2023	The Mother of All Lies	Asmae El Moudir	Morocco
2024	Happy Holidays	Scandar Copti	Palestine

== Jury Prize ==
Year	Film	Director(s)	Nationality of Director (at time of film's release)
2001	The Unsaid	Tom McLoughlin	United States
2002	Bend it like Beckham	Gurinder Chadha	United Kingdom
2003	The Station Agent	Tom McCarthy	United States
2004	Electric Shadows (Meng ying tong nian)	Xiao Jiang	China
2004	Moolaadé	Ousmane Sembène	Senegal
2005	C.R.A.Z.Y.	Jean-Marc Vallée	Canada
2005	Bab al-Makam	Mohamed Malas	Tunisia
2006	The Paper Will Be Blue	Radu Muntean	Romania
2007	The Hard-Hearted	Alexey Mizgirev	Russia
2007	Slingshot (Tirador)	Brillante Mendoza	Philippines
2008	The Shaft (Dixia de tiankong)	Chi Zhang	China
2009	Les barons	Nabil Ben Yadir	Belgium
2009	My daughter	Charlotte Lim Lay Kuen	Malaysia
2010	Becloud	Alejandro Gerber Bicecci	Mexico
2010	Beyond the Steppes	Vanja d’Alcantara	Belgium
2011	Snowtown	Justin Kurzel	Australia
2012	A Hijacking	Tobias Lindholm	Denmark
2012	Taboor	Vahid Vakilifar	Iran
2013	La Piscina	Carlos M. Quintela	Cuba
2014	War (Chrieg)	Simon Jaquemet	Switzerland
2015	Thithi	Raam Reddy	India
2016	Mister Universo	Tizza Covi & Rainer Frimmel	Italy & Austria
2018	The Chambermaid	Lila Avilés	Mexico
2019	Last Visit	Abdulmohsen Aldhabaan	Saudi Arabia
2019	Mosaic Portrait	Zhang Yixiang	China
2022	Alma Viva	Cristèle Alves Meira	France Portugal
2022	The Blue Caftan	Maryam Touzani	Morocco
2023	Bye Bye Tiberias	Lina Soualem	France Algeria Palestine
2023	Hounds	Kamal Lazraq	Morocco
2024	The Cottage (La quinta)	Silvina Schnicer	Argentina
2024	The Village Next to Paradise	Mo Harawe	Austria

== Best Director ==
Year	Film	Director(s)	Nationality of Director (at time of film's release)
2002	City of God	Fernando Meirelles	Brazil
2003	Zatōichi	Takeshi Kitano	Japan
2011	Seven Acts of Mercy (Italian: Sette Opere di misericordia)	Gianluca e Massimiliano De Serio	Italy
2013	Medeas	Andrea Pallaoro	United States
2014	Labour of Love	Aditya Vikram Sengupta	India
2015	Neon Bull	Gabriel Mascaro	Brazil
2016	Knife in the Clear Water	Wang Xuebo	China
2018	The Load	Ognjen Glavonić	Serbia
2019	Tlamess	Ala Eddine Slim	Tunisia
2022	Thunder	Carmen Jaquier	Switzerland
2023	Banel & Adama	Ramata-Toulaye Sy	France Senegal
2024	Under the Volcano	Damian Kocur	Poland

== Best Actress ==
Year	Actress	Film
2001	Chaïbia Adraoui	Mona Saber
2002	Clara Khoury	Rana's Wedding
2003	Najat Benssallem	Raja
2004	Vera Farmiga	Down to the Bone
2005	Shirley Henderson	Frozen
2006	Fatou N'Diaye	A Sunday in Kigali
2007	Yoo Yeon-mi	With the Girl of Black Soil (Geomen tangyi sonyeo oi)
2008	Melissa Leo	Frozen River
2009	Lotte Verbeek	Nothing Personal
2010	Sibel Kekilli	Die Fremde
2011	Joslyn Jensen	Without
2012	Elina Reinold	Mushrooming
2013	Alicia Vikander	Hotell
2014	Clotilde Hesme	The Last Hammer Blow
2015	Galatea Bellugi	Keeper
2016	Fereshteh Hosseini	Parting
2018	Aenne Schwarz	All Is Well
2019	Nichola Burley & Roxanne Scrimshaw	Lynn + Lucy
2022	Choi Seung-yoon	Riceboy Sleeps
2023	Asja Zara Lagumdžija	Excursion
2024	Wafaa Aoun & Manar Shehab	Happy Holidays

== Best Actor ==
Year	Actor	Film
2001	Jacques Dutronc	C'est la vie
2002	Yusikhe Kebozuka	Go
2003	Bogdan Diklić	Fuse (Gori Vatra)
2004	Bogdan Stupka	Our Own (Svoi)
2005	Daniel Day-Lewis	The Ballad of Jack and Rose
2006	Max Riemelt	The Red Cockatoo
2007	Tommi Korpela	Man's Job
2008	Eero Aho	Tears of April
2009	Cyron Melville	Love and Rage (Vanvittig forelsket)
2010	None awarded	-
2011	Daniel Henshall	Snowtown
2012	Søren Malling	A Hijacking
2013	Didier Michon & Slimane Dazi	Fevers (Fièvres)
2014	Benjamin Lutzke	War (Chrieg)
2015	Gunnar Jónsson	Virgin Mountain
2016	Baldur Einarsson & Blær Hinriksson	Heartstone
2018	Nidhal Saadi	Look at Me
2019	Toby Wallace	Babyteeth
2022	Arswendy Bening Swara	Autobiography
2023	Doga Karakas	Dormitory
2024	Roman Lutskyi	Under the Volcano

== Jury Prize for Best Director ==
Year	Director(s)	Film
2011	Gianluca e Massimiliano De Serio	Seven Acts of Mercy (Italian: Sette Opere di misericordia)
2011	Raam Reddy	Tithi (Kannada: ತಿಥಿ)

== Prize for the best interpretation ==
Year	Film	Director(s)	Nationality of Director (at time of film's release)
2010	Animal Kingdom	David Michôd	Australia
2010	When We Leave (german: Die Fremde)	Feo Aladag	Germany

== Best Screenplay Award ==
Year	Film	Director(s)	Nationality of Director (at time of film's release)
2002	Matir Moina (The Clay Bird)	Tareque Masud	Bangladesh
2003	Les yeux secs (Cry No More)	Narjiss Nejjar	France

== Golden Star Grand Prize Short Film ==
Year	Film	Director(s)	Nationality of Director (at time of film's release)
2002	Chiffons (Batang trapo)	Ramon Mez de Guzman	Philippines
2003	Hymne à la gazelle	Stéphanie Duvivier	France

== Special Jury Prize Short Film ==
Year	Film	Director(s)	Nationality of Director (at time of film's release)
2002	Malcolm	Baker Karim	Sweden
2003	Haçla	Tariq Teguia	France

== The Cinécoles Short Film Prize ==
The Cinécoles Short Film Prize was created in 2010 and focuses on new cinematographic talent and is open to students from Morocco's cinema schools and institutes.

Through the competition, the FIFM Foundation offers opportunity for film creation and career advancement for new filmmakers and during the festival creates a platform for discussion between seasoned professionals and less-experienced filmmakers.

The competition provides an occasion to present the student cinema for the first time in Morocco and within the framework of a prestigious event.

The Cinécoles Prize comes with a grant worth 300,000 dirhams, donated by His Royal Highness Prince Moulay Rachid, President of the FIFM Foundation, for the film student to make his or her second short film. It is managed by the FIFM Foundation and must be used to make a new film, which must be completed during the three years following the award. In this way, the FIFM Foundation supports the creation of this second work through careful monitoring and participation in the different stages of writing, directing and editing.

The Short Film Jury for the 13th edition of the Marrakech International Film Festival (2013) was presided over by Moroccan filmmaker Nour Eddine Lakhmari and included Astrid Bergès-Frisbey - Actress (France), Jan Kounen - Director & screenwriter (France), Atiq Rahimi - Novelist, director & screenwriter (Afghanistan) and Sylvie Testud - Actress, director, screenwriter & author (France).

Year	Film	Director(s)
2010	-	Mahassine El Hachadi
2011	L'Arroseur	Mohamed Aouad
2012	Mejor Une vie meilleure	Tarik Leihemdi
2013	Bad	Ayoub Lahnoud & Alaa Akaaboune
2014	Dalto	Essam Doukhou
