= Siavash (TV series) =

2020 Iranian TV series

- Persian: سیاوش
- Genre: Drama
- Written by: Pouya saedi, Ali Amirriahi, Amirreza Rashti
- Directed by: Soroush Mohammadzadeh
- Starring: Milad KeyMaram; Reza Kianian; Alireza Jafari; Majid Salehi; Tarlan Parvaneh; Mohammadreza Solati; Sogol Khaligh; Mohammad Valizadegan
- Theme music composer: Parvaz Homay
- Composers: Parvaz Homay; Masoud Sekhavatdoost
- Country of origin: Iran
- Original language: Persian
- No. of seasons: 2
- No. of episodes: 18

Production
- Producer: Mehdi Yari
- Production location: Tehran
- Cinematography: Mehran Mamdooh
- Editor: Siamak Mehmandoost
- Running time: 50 minutes

Original release
- Network: Home video
- Release: 1 February – 27 May 2021

Siavash (Persian: سیاوش, romanized: Siyavash) is an Iranian drama series directed by Soroush Mohammadzadeh. Production of the series began before the outbreak of the COVID-19 pandemic, and most of the filming continued during the pandemic.

== Storyline ==
Siavash Saghi (Milad KeyMaram) is a wrestler and world champion and his fiancé Marjan needs a liver transplant. Siavash goes to Nosrat (Reza Kianian), a billionaire, due to his financial inability to pay for his fiancé's surgery. But in exchange for giving money to Siavash, Nosrat asks him to marry his daughter Maral (Tarlan Parvaneh).

== Cast ==
- Milad KeyMaram
- Reza Kianian
- Alireza Jafari
- Majid Salehi
- Tarlan Parvaneh
- Mohammadreza Solati
- Sogol Khaligh
- Mohammad Valizadegan
- Khosro Shahraz
- Giti Ghasemi
- Mehdi Hosseininia
- Nahid Moslemi
- Yadollah Shademani
- Roya Javidnia
- Elham Jedi
- Mahsa Bagheri
