= Anahita Afshar =

Iranian actress (born 1986)

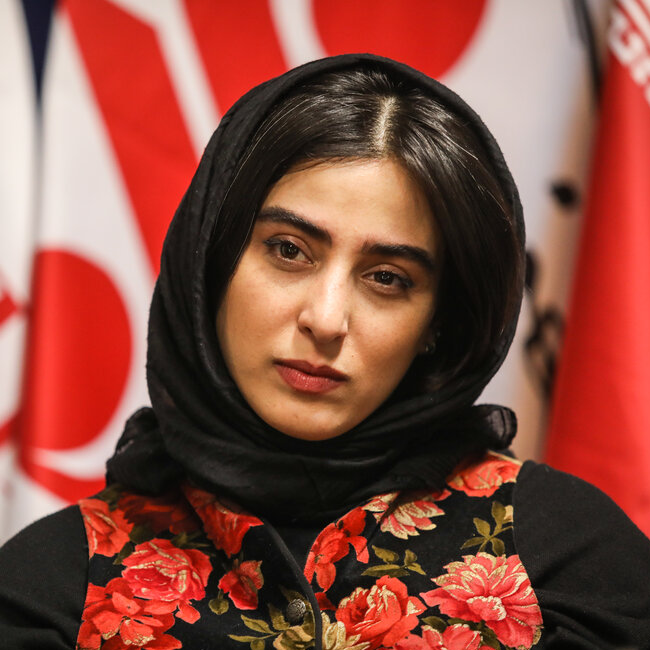
- Afshar in 2019
- Born: July 29, 1986 (age 40); Hashtrud, East Azerbaijan, Iran
- Occupation: Actress
- Years active: 2006–present

Anahita Afshar (Persian: آناهیتا افشار; born July 29, 1986) is an Iranian actress. She is best known for her role as Marzieh in Three by Four (2008). In 2015, Afshar received a Hafez Award nomination for her performance in Snow (2014).

== Early life ==
Anahita Afshar was born on July 29, 1986, in Hashtrud, East Azerbaijan, Iran.

== Filmography ==
=== Film ===
Year	Title	Role	Director	Notes	Ref(s)
2008	The Featherless Peacock		Javad Mozdabadi		
2010	Life with Closed Eyes	Parisa	Rasoul Sadrameli		
2010	Private		Mehdi Rahmani		
2012	The Snow on the Pines	Nasim	Payman Maadi		
2013	One, Two, Three, Five		Mohammad Ebrahim Moayyeri		
2013	Duet	Sepideh	Navid Danesh	Short film	
2014	Snow	Sara	Mehdi Rahmani		
2016	Bridge of Sleep	Neda	Oktay Baraheni		
2017	Villa Dwellers	Mr. Yeganeh's wife	Monir Gheidi		
2017	The Atmosphere Station	Marjan	Mehdi Jafari		
2018	A Heart for an Eye	Parvaneh	Rahim Toufan		
2018	Day for Night		Kaveh Ebrahimpour	Short film	
2019	Seven and a Half	Nahid	Navid Mahmoudi		
2020	Witness	The mother	Ali Asgari	Short film	
2023	Mud Room	Khazal	Mohammad Asgari		
2025	Antique	Jamileh	Hadi Naiji		
2025	Khati	Asareh	Fereydoun Najafi		
2025	Tehran Another View	Leili	Ali Behrad		
2026	Killing Without Killing		Hossein Domari		

=== Web ===
Year	Title	Role	Director	Platform	Notes	Ref(s)
2021	The Frog	Negar	Houman Seyyedi	Namava	Cameo; 1 episode	
2021	Them	Mahtab	Milad Jarmouz	Filmnet	Leading role; 1 episode	
2023	The Lion Skin	Shirin Beigzadeh	Jamshid Mahmoudi	Filmnet	Recurring role; 3 episodes	
2023	You Only Go Around Once	Goli	Soroush Sehat	Filimo, Namva	Main role	
2025	Beretta: The Story of a Gun	Setareh	Amir Hossein Torabi	Filmnet	Main role	

=== Television ===
Year	Title	Role	Director	Network	Notes	Ref(s)
2004	Homeless	Hamid Bayat's company's accountant	Reza Attaran	IRIB TV3	TV series; guest appearance	
2005	The Accused Escaped	Sahar Moshrefi	Reza Attaran	IRIB TV3	TV series; guest appearance	
2007	Sweet & Sour	Jahan's company's secretary	Reza Attaran	IRIB TV3	TV series; guest appearance	
2008	Three by Four	Marzieh	Majid Salehi	IRIB TV1	TV series; main role	
2009	Redemption		Sirous Moghaddam	IRIB TV3	TV series; recurring role	
2010	Under 8		Sirous Moghaddam	IRIB TV1	TV series; supporting role	
2014	Madineh	Hanieh Kashani	Sirous Moghaddam	IRIB TV1	TV series; main role	
2017–2018	Awning	Mozhdeh	Jamshid Mahmoudi, Navid Mahmoudi	IRIB TV2	TV series; recurring role	

== Awards and nominations ==
Name of the award ceremony, year presented, category, nominee of the award, and the result of the nomination
Award	Year	Category	Nominated Work	Result	Ref(s)
Hafez Awards	2015	Best Actress – Motion Picture	Snow	Nominated	
