= Sogol Khaligh =

Iranian actress (born 1988)

- سوگل خلیق
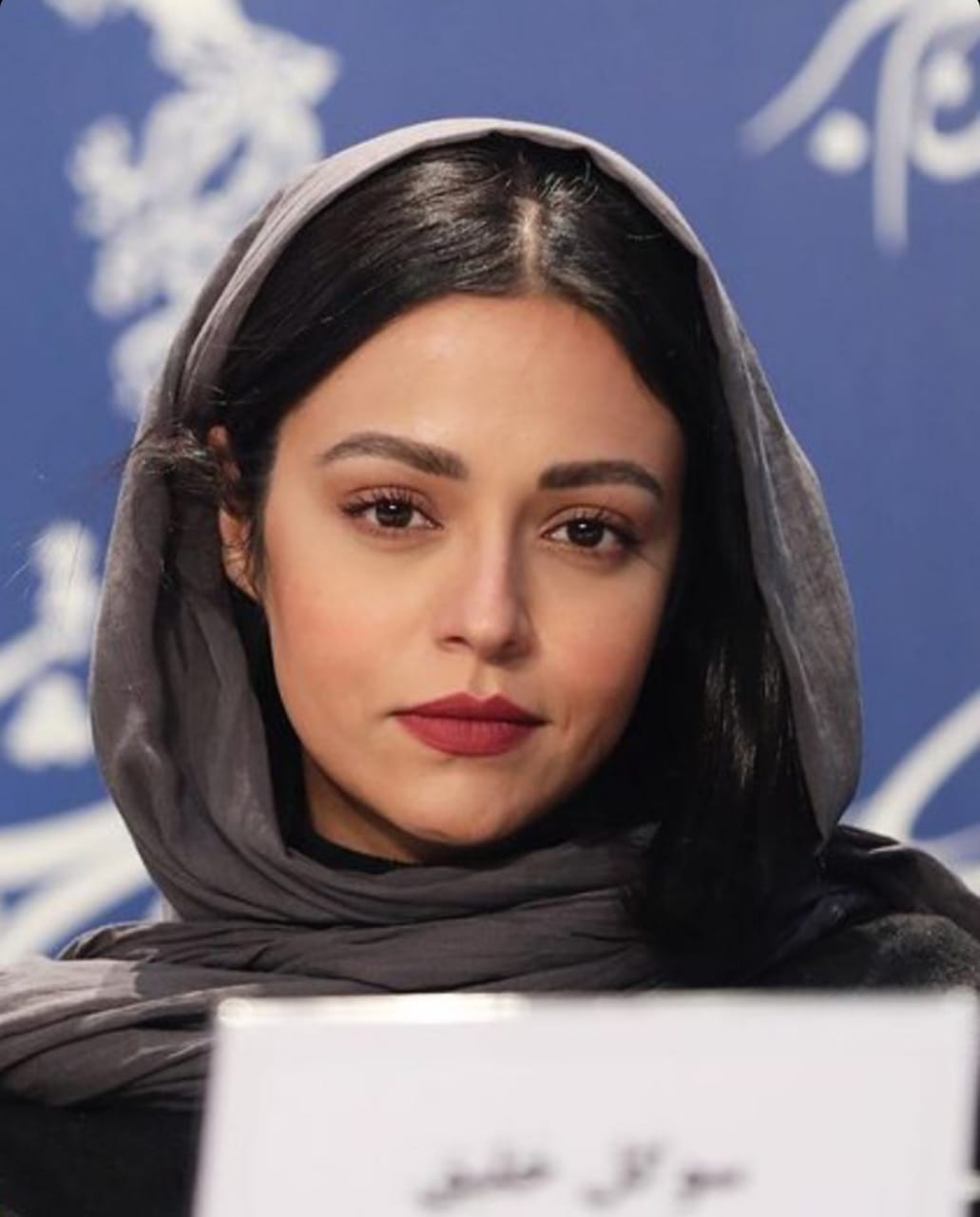
- Khaligh at the 2022 Fajr Film Festival
- Born: November 7, 1988 (age 37); Tehran, Iran
- Education: Tehran University of Art
- Occupation: Actress
- Years active: 2011–present
- Partner: Kaveh Rad

Sogol Khaligh (Persian: سوگل خلیق; born November 7, 1988) is an Iranian actress. She is best known for her role as a trans man in The Accomplice (2020), for which she earned a Hafez Award nomination. In 2024, Khaligh received her first Hafez Award for her performance in The Notebook (2023–2024).

== Early life ==
She's a graduate of the Faculty of Cinema and Theater of Tehran University of Art in Theatrical Directing.

== Filmography ==
=== Film ===
Year	Title	Role	Director	Notes
2013	A Not So Simple Event		Vahid Raboudan	Short film
2015	Two		Soheila Golestani	
2016	Hangover		Dariush Ghazbani	
2017	Mahoor		Majid Niamorad	
2017	Golden Time	Sogol	Pouria Kakavand	
2019	In Silence	Setareh	Zharzh Hashemzadeh	Completed in 2016
2020	Drowning in Holy Water	Afghan Immigrant Girl	Navid Mahmoudi	
2020	False Ceiling	Tina	Mohsen Najafi Mehri	Short film
2022	Golden Night	Sanaz	Yousef Hatamikia	
2023	The Last Birthday		Navid Mahmoudi	
2024	Pregnant		Mostafa Tanabandeh, Mohammad Tanabandeh	

=== Web ===
Year	Title	Role	Director	Platform
2020	The Accomplice	Sima Sabouri	Mostafa Kiaee	Filimo, Namava
2021	Siavash	Jeyran Tadayon	Soroush Mohammadzadeh	Namava
2021	His Majesty	Mounes	Hamed Mohammadi	Filimo
2023–2024	The Notebook	Nazanin Majd	Kiarash Asadizadeh	FILMNET
2025	Beretta	Bahar	Amir Hossein Torabi	FILMNET
TBA	1001 Nights		Mostafa Kiaee	Filimo

=== Television ===
Year	Title	Role	Director	Notes	Network	Ref(s)
2017	Flight at Zero Altitude	Shirin	Abdolhassan Barzideh	TV series	IRIB TV1	
2018	The Convists		Seyyed Jamal Seyyed Hatami	TV series	IRIB TV1	
2018	Whisper	Leila	Ebrahim Sheibani	TV series	IRIB TV1	
2019	Deldar	Rona Nazari	Jamshid Mahmoudi, Navid Mahmoudi	TV series	IRIB TV2	

== Theatre ==
Year	Title	Playwright	Director	Stage
2014	Friday Noon Story	Mohammad Mosavat	Mohammad Mosavat	City Theater of Tehran
2015	Mr. Karami's House	Amir Akhavin	Amir Akhavin	Baran Theater
2015–2016	He Was My North, My South, My East and My West	Sajjad Afsharian	Mohammad Valizadegan	Baran Theater
2016–2018	Rainless Days	Amin Behrouzi	Amin Behrouzi	City Theater of Tehran, Shahrzad Theater Complex
2017	And God Has Forgotten My	Houman Seyyedi	Hamoun Seyyedi	Iranian Artists Forum
2017–2018	Last of the Red Hot Lovers	Neil Simon	Bahram Tashakor	Plaiz Theatre
2018	People of the Air	Diana Fathi	Diana Fathi	City Theater of Tehran
2018	Game Fowl	Omid Sohrabi	Omid Sohrabi	Iranshahr Theatre
2019	Burn	Mehrdad Kouroshnia	Alireza Ara, Alireza Oliaee	Iranshahr Theatre
2022–2023	The Father	Florian Zeller	Arvand Dashtaray	City Theater of Tehran
2023	Tehran	Diana Fathi	Diana Fathi	

== Awards and nominations ==
Award	Year	Category	Nominated Work	Result	Ref.
Hafez Awards	2021	Best Actress – Television Series Drama	The Accomplice	Nominated	
Hafez Awards	2024	Best Actress – Television Series Comedy	The Notebook	Won	
Iran Cinema Celebration	2016	Best Actress in a Supporting Role	Two	Nominated	
