= Caroline Khodadian =

Iranian-Armenian Artist

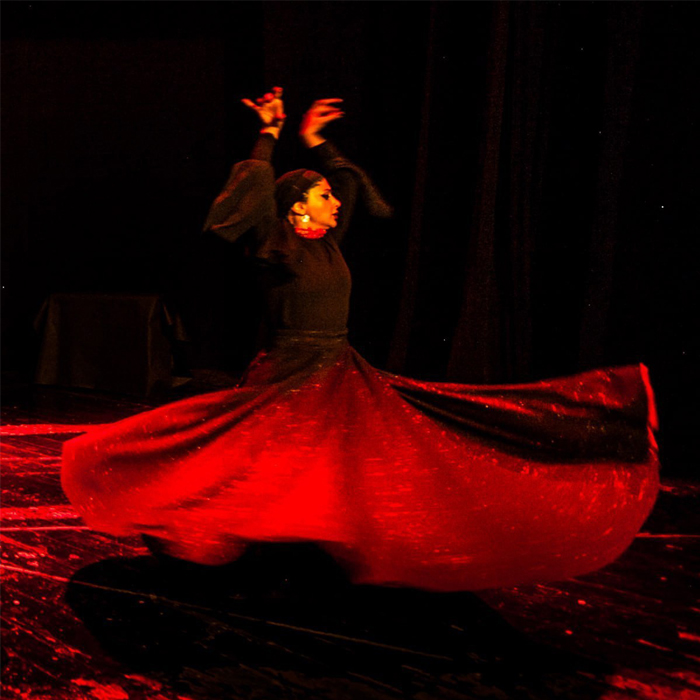
- Born: July 8, 1978 (age 47); Ahvaz, iran
- Occupation(s): Flamenco, dancer, choreographer, Sama
- Known for: The first Armenian woman to dance Sama in Iran
- Website: www.carolinekhodadian.com

Caroline Khodadian (Armenian: Քարոլին Խոդադյան; Persian: کارولین خدادیان), (born 1978) is the first Iranian-Armenian woman to practice Sufism whirling (Sama) and the creator of the unique dance style "Samamenco".

== Biography ==
Born in Ahvaz to an Iranian-Armenian family, Khodadian completed her primary, middle, and high school education at Armenian schools in Tehran. In 2004, she graduated with a degree in law from the Islamic Azad University of Isfahan.

== Professional life ==
Khodadian combined flamenco dance with Sufi whirling (Sama), creating the dance style "Samamenco". (Note: She said about the style she achieved after years: "After learning the daf instrument, I combined the two dance styles of Sama and Flamenco and created Samamenco movements.")

Hraparak News Agency writes: Caroline Khodadian is the first woman in Iran to have solo performances since the revolution, a bold step in Iranian society, given the restrictions in place in Iran. (Note: Khodadyan emphasizes that artists grow through difficulties, and for him, achieving success in his homeland is more valuable.)

Since 2019, she has been studying at the National Dance and Theater Academy of Armenia under the guidance of renowned Armenian artists Sofi Devoyan and movement designer "Maria Hovsepyan". During this time, she perfected her skills in Armenian dance and hand movements. She also studied briefly at the “Anna Kalashyan” Dance Academy, another prominent institution led by a distinguished Armenian artist.

Khodadian also began playing the daf under "Vandad Masahzadeh", a composer and conductor of the “Kuban Orchestra,” performing at various concerts, including those at the Andisheh Music Hall and other venues. She later studied academic daf playing with Zakaria Yousefi.

Khodadian has performed as the character “Hananeh” in the opera Hallaj, directed by Parvaz Homay, making her the first Iranian-Armenian woman to perform on stage after the Islamic Revolution. She also performed solo Sufi whirling (Sama) for over two months at the Sa'dabad Complex, Vahdat Hall, and Erikeh Iranians.

== Activities ==
Khodadian has also appeared as a dancer and movement designer in the following performances:

- Siavash Sudabeh, directed by Anahid Abad (dancer in the role of Fire)
- Ancient Gods, directed by Biayna Mahmoudi (dancer in the role of Satan)
- Schizophrenia, directed by Hamed Rahimi Nasr (movement designer and dancer)
- Katyusha, directed by Arash Davoodi and Farshad Arj (movement designer of Samamenco)

== See also ==
- Iranian Armenians
