= Fereshteh Hosseini =

Afghan-Iranian actress (born 1997)

- فرشته حسینی
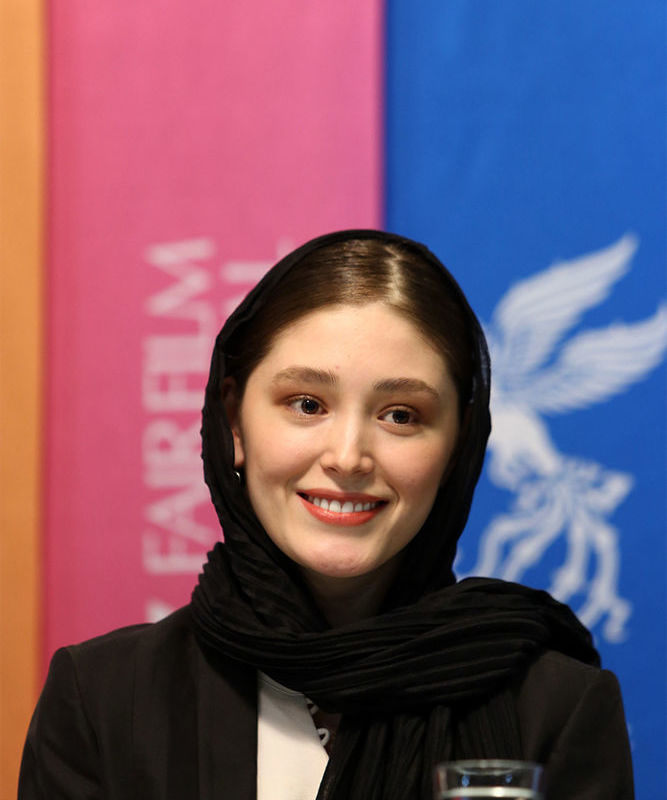
- Hosseini at the 2019 Fajr Film Festival
- Born: April 26, 1997 (age 29); Tehran, Iran
- Citizenship: Afghanistan; Iran
- Occupation: Actress
- Years active: 2009–present
- Agent: Greensmith Artists
- Spouse: Navid Mohammadzadeh (m. 2021)

Fereshteh Hosseini (Persian: فرشته حسینی; born April 26, 1997) is an Afghan-Iranian actress. She is best known for her roles in Parting (2016), The Frog (2020–2021), and Dwelling Among the Gods (2024). Hosseini won the Best Actress award at the 16th Marrakech International Film Festival for her performance in Parting.

== Early life ==
Fereshteh Hosseini was born on April 26, 1997, in Tehran, Iran. Her parents were two Afghan Hazara immigrants who had immigrated to Iran before her birth due to the war in Afghanistan. Hosseini has four sisters named Masoumeh, Maryam, Hanieh and Zahra, and a brother named Mohammad. Her sister Maryam is also an actress.

== Personal life ==
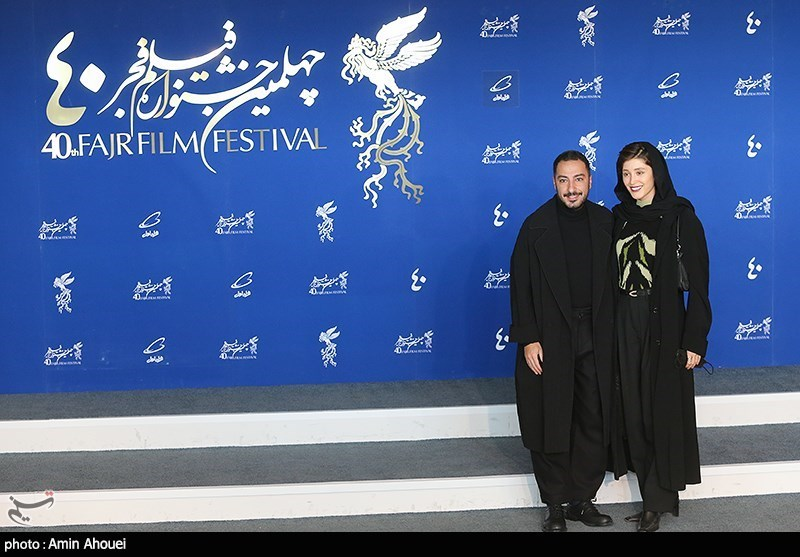
Hosseini and Navid Mohammadzadeh at the 2022 Fajr Film Festival.

In 2020, rumors began circulating about a relationship between Hosseini and Iranian actor Navid Mohammadzadeh. In April 2021, Mohammadzadeh confirmed the rumors by publishing a post on Instagram. The couple married in July 2021.

== Filmography ==
=== Film ===
| Year | Title | Role | Director | Notes | Ref(s) |
|---|---|---|---|---|---|
| 2015 | I'm a Happy Actress | Sakineh | Samereh Rezaee | Documentary film | |
| 2016 | Parting | Fereshteh | Navid Mahmoudi | | |
| 2018 | Rona, Azim's Mother | Hengameh | Jamshid Mahmoudi | | |
| 2018 | Willed | Woman | Ashkan Kheilnezhad | Short film | |
| 2019 | Yalda, a Night for Forgiveness | Anar | Massoud Bakhshi | | |
| 2019 | Tsunami | Targol Ebrahimi | Milad Sadrameli | | |
| 2019 | Seven and a Half | Fereshteh | Navid Mahmoudi | | |
| 2022 | Squad of Girls | Simin | Monir Gheidi | | |
| 2022 | Timeless | | Kian Yaghouti | Short film | |
| 2022 | Won't You Cry? | Saba | Alireza Motamedi | | |
| 2024 | Dwelling Among the Gods | Fereshteh | Vuk Ršumović | | |
| 2024 | Hard Shell | Leila | Majid Reza Mostafavi | | |
| 2025 | Cinema Jazireh | Leila | Gözde Kural | | |
| 2025 | Between Dreams and Hope | Azad | Farnoosh Samadi | | |

=== Web ===
| Year | Title | Role | Director | Platform | Notes | Ref(s) |
|---|---|---|---|---|---|---|
| 2020–2021 | The Frog | Leila | Houman Seyyedi | Namava | Main role; 15 episodes | |
| 2024 | The Asphalt Jungle | Hengameh Sabaghan | Pejman Teymourtash | Namava | Main role; 14 episodes | |

=== Music video ===
| Year | Title | Artist(s) | Notes | Ref(s) |
|---|---|---|---|---|
| 2019 | "My Beloved" | Shervin Hajipour | From the Motion Picture "Tsunami" | |

== Theatre ==
| Year | Title | Playwright | Director | Stage | Notes | Ref(s) |
|---|---|---|---|---|---|---|
| — | I'm a Salvador | | | | | |
| 2015 | My Cinemas | Mohammad Rahmanian | | Charsou Cineplex | | |
| 2016 | A Memory, a Monologue, a Rant, and a Prayer | Various | Mehrdad Khamenei | Entezami Museum | | |
| 2016 | The Little Black Fish | Samad Behrangi | Mehrdad Khamenei | Entezami Museum | | |
| 2017 | The Little Prince | Antoine de Saint-Exupéry | Mehrdad Khamenei | Entezami Museum | | |
| 2017–2018 | I Am an Emotional Creature: The Secret Life of Girls Around the World | Eve Ensler | Mehrdad Khamenei | Entezami Museum | | |
| 2024–2025 | Funfair | Navid Mohammadzadeh | | Labkhand Theater Complex | As costume designer | |

== Awards and nominations ==
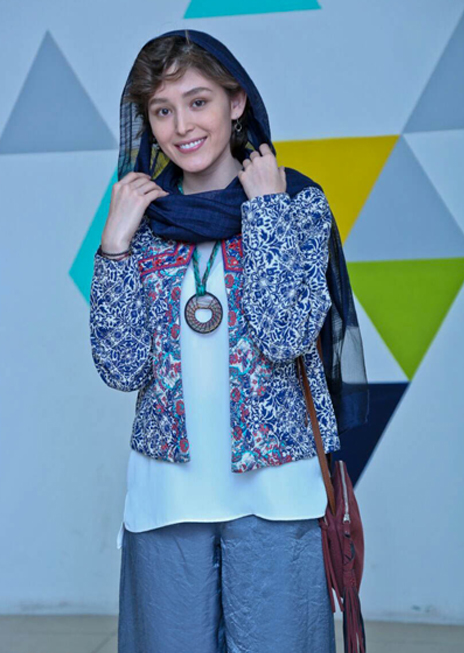
Hosseini in 2018

Name of the award ceremony, year presented, category, nominee of the award, and the result of the nomination
| Award | Year | Category | Nominated Work | Result | Ref(s) |
|---|---|---|---|---|---|
| Euro Balkan Film Festival | 2025 | Best Actress | Dwelling Among the Gods | Won | |
| Euro Balkan Film Festival | 2025 | Special Mention for Best Actor/Actress | Dwelling Among the Gods | Won | |
| Fajr Film Festival | 2022 | Best Actress in a Supporting Role | Squad of Girls | Honorary Diploma | |
| Hafez Awards | 2021 | Best Actress – Television Series Drama | The Frog | Resigned | |
| Hafez Awards | 2024 | Best Actress – Television Series Drama | The Asphalt Jungle | Nominated | |
| Iran Cinema Celebration | 2018 | Best Actress in a Leading Role | Parting | Nominated | |
| Hong Kong Lights International Film Festival | 2025 | Best Actress | Dwelling Among the Gods | Won | |
| Marrakech International Film Festival | 2016 | Best Actress | Parting | Won | |
| Niš International Film Festival | 2026 | Best Foreign Actress | Dwelling Among the Gods | Won | |
| Otranto Film Festival | 2024 | Best Actress | Dwelling Among the Gods | Won | |
| Pula Film Festival | 2025 | Best Actress in a Croatian Minority Co-production | Dwelling Among the Gods | Won | |
