= Maryam Pirband =

- مریم پیربند
- Born: February 16; Tehran, Iran
- Occupations: Filmmaker, director, screenwriter and actress
- Years active: 2005–present

Maryam Pirband (Persian: مریم پیربند) is an Iranian-American filmmaker, director, screenwriter, actress, and a judge in international film festivals. Some of her films have been selected and awarded by notable international festivals, such as the Cannes Film Festival and the Dhaka International Film Festival, Jaipur International Film Festival, new York international film festival. She is best known for winning the "Best Female Director Award" at Action On Film International Film Festival for Silence in 2017. Pirband is the only Iranian official member of Alliance of Women Directors, and has participated in many film festivals as a jury member and head of jury. She's also known for Dance with Me (2012), Hanaii (2012), and Fermysk (2017), Dandelion Season (2020), Vertical (2023).

== Early life ==
Pirband was born in Tehran. She is graduated in Master in screenwriting from Azusa Pacific University, Movie Directing from Society of Iranian Youth Film Makers. She also has a B.A in Economics from Tehran university. She is a PhD student at EGS in Philosophy, Art & Critical Thought.

== Career ==
Pirband began her professional activities in the movie industry as an assistant and script supervisor. In 2006, she began taking roles as a stunt performer after meeting Peyman Abadi. After being stunt roles, Pirband began working on producing and directing films, and made her first short film in the action genre. Prior to her directing career, Pirband enjoyed acting roles in 22 films, television series and theater productions . P6 marked her debut as a director. She directed, wrote and produced over 18 films which have been submitted to international film festivals. Dance with Me was her first film to make its way to a notable international film festival at the Cannes. Slemani International Film Festival in Iraq marked her debut as an international judge. She has won numerous awards worldwide such as: Best Female Filmmaker Award for Dandelion Season, 10th International New York Film Festival, Social Impact Award for Dandelion Season, Tietê International Film Awards, Brazil, Yellow Rose Award for Dandelion Season at 14th Jaipur Film Festival, India, Best Feature award for Dandelion Season at 5th Delhi Film Festival, India, Best Director Award for Silence at Job International Film Festival, Iran, Best foreign short film for Fermysk at Action on Film Festival, USA, Most Daring Award for Fermysk at Hollywood Dreamz Festival, USA, Special Jury award for Fermysk at International Cinema through Women's Eye, Kurdistan, Award of Merit for Fermysk at Pacific Screen Awards, Indonesia, Zeus Director Award for Fermysk at International Olympus Film Festival, USA, Best Director Award for Silence at European International Film Festival, USA, Best foreign short film for Fermysk at Action on Film (AOF) MegaFest XVIII Festival, USA,

== Filmography ==
Year	Film	Credited as			Notes
Year	Film	Director	Writer	Producer	Notes
2022- 2023	Vertical	Yes	No	Vertical Productions	
2019-2020	Dandelion Season	Yes	Yes	Dandelion Season LLC	
2017-2018	Fermysk	Yes	Yes	Majsam Productions	
2015-2016	Perplexity	Yes	Yes	Majid Molaie	
2015	Cell & Coin	Yes	Yes	Majid Molaei	
2014	My Portion	Yes	Yes	Yes	
2014	A Tiny Mistake	Yes	No		
2014	Silence	Yes	Yes	Job Film Fest	
2012	Dance With Me	Yes	Yes	Alireza Raeisian	
2011	Hanaii	Yes	Yes	Yes	
2010	Shoot	Yes	Yes	Art field of Tehran province	
2010	This House Is Safe	Yes	Yes	Art field of Tehran province	
2009	P6	Yes	Yes	Yes	
2008	Chain of Enthusiasm	Yes	Yes	Ali Dehbashi	

== Notable works ==
=== Silence ===
This short film was directed and written by Maryam Pirpand. It was nominated in 6 national and international film festivals. She won ″Best Female Director Award″ at Action On Film International Film Festival for Directing.

=== Dance with me ===
This short film also was directed and written by Maryam Pirband. It was nominated in 8 national and international film festivals such as 2012 Cannes Film Festival and Duhok International Film Festival.
