= You Only Go Around Once =

2023 Iranian television series

- Persian: مگه تموم عمر چند تا بهاره
- Genre: Comedy-drama; Fantasy
- Created by: Soroush Sehhat
- Written by: Soroush Sehhat; Iman Safaee
- Directed by: Soroush Sehhat
- Starring: Majid Yousefi; Gilda Vishki; Kazem Sayahi; Ghodratollah Izadi; Ali Mosaffa; Anahita Afshar; Mohammad Naderi; Bijan Banafshekhah; Vahid Aghapour; Bahar Katouzi
- Music by: Peyman Yazdanian
- Country of origin: Iran
- Original language: Persian
- No. of seasons: 1
- No. of episodes: 25

Production
- Producer: Mohammad Reza Takhtkeshian
- Cinematography: Soroush Alizadeh
- Editor: Khashayar Movaheddian
- Running time: 43–74 minutes

Original release
- Network: Filimo; Namava
- Release: 15 July – 14 December 2023

You Only Go Around Once (Persian: مگه تموم عمر چندتا بهاره, romanized: Mage Tamoom-e Omr Chand-ta Bahare?) is a 2023 Iranian television series written by Soroush Sehhat and Iman Safaee, directed by Sehhat, and starring Majid Yousefi, Gilda Vishki, Kazem Sayahi, Ghodratollah Izadi, and Ali Mosaffa. The series premiered on Filimo and Namava every Thursday from July 15 to December 14, 2023.

== Synopsis ==
After the death of their father in a car accident while being driven by their cousin Shahin (Ali Mosaffa), Nima (Majid Yousefi) and Azita (Gilda Vishki), come to Tehran from their city and live with the family of their uncle Jalal (Ghodratollah Izadi), upon Jalal's insistence. Shahin is a painter who is suffering from guilty conscience and depression after his car accident and the death of his uncle. Nima is a voice actor who always has problems in his relationship with his girlfriend, Goli (Anahita Afshar). Azita is a chess player who always loses to her opponents. Shahram (Kazem Sayahi), their other cousin, is a failed musician who works as a taxi driver. All of them face different challenges because of a manuscript, a snake and a hole.

== Cast ==
- Majid Yousefi as Nima Rabbani
- Gilda Vishki as Azita Rabbani
- Kazem Sayahi as Shahram Rabbani
- Ghodratollah Izadi as Jalal Rabbani
- Ali Mosaffa as Shahin Rabbani
- Anahita Afshar as Goli
- Mohammad Naderi as Mahmoud Rasouli
- Bijan Banafshekhah as Neo, ruler of "the hole"
- Vahid Aghapour as Bahram
- Bahar Katouzi as Marjan Moradi
- Ehsan Mansoori as Kazem
- Ardeshir Kazemi as Grandpa, Jalal's father
- Einollah Daryaee as Razzaghi
- Hassan Nouri as Jeemshit, Neo's butler
- Rasoul Akbarian
- Fahimeh Amnzadeh
- Maryam Mahour
- Shakila Samavati
- Alireza Nasehi
- Maryam Goudarzi
- Amir Reza Pirhadi
- Pavan Afsar
- Rahil Falahfar

=== Cameo appearances ===
- Hootan Shakiba as Habib Naghavi (from Bachelors)
- Amir Hossein Rostami as Masoud Sharifian (from Bachelors)
- Amir Kazemi as Maziar Rahmati (from Bachelors)
- Pejman Jamshidi as Pejman Jamshidi (from Pejman)
- Behnam Tashakor as Nima Afshar (from Doctors' Building)
- Shaghayegh Dehghan as Parastoo Shirzad (from Doctors' Building)
- Falamak Joneidi as Herself
- Hanieh Tavassoli as Herself
- Sara Bahrami as Herself

== Reception ==
=== Awards and nominations ===
Award	Year	Category	Recipient	Result	Ref(s)
Hafez Awards	2024	Best Actor – Television Series Comedy	Ghodratollah Izadi	Won	
Hafez Awards	2024	Best Actor – Television Series Comedy	Ali Mosaffa	Nominated	
Hafez Awards	2024	Best Actress – Television Series Comedy	Bahar Katouzi	Nominated	
Hafez Awards	2024	Best Director – Television Series	Soroush Sehhat	Nominated	
Hafez Awards	2024	Best Screenplay – Television Series	Soroush Sehhat, Iman Safaee	Nominated	
Hafez Awards	2024	Best Television Series	Mohammad Reza Takhtkeshian	Nominated	
