= Africa (2011 film) =

- Film poster
- Directed by: Houman Seyyedi
- Written by: Houman Seyyedi
- Produced by: Majid Esmaili Parsa; Mojtaba Amini
- Starring: Shahab Hosseini; Azadeh Samadi; Javad Ezzati; Amir Jadidi; Mina Sadati
- Cinematography: Ali Tabrizi
- Edited by: Houman Seyyedi; Ali Tabrizi
- Music by: Bamdad Afshar
- Release date: 2011
- Country: Iran
- Language: Persian

Africa (Persian: آفریقا) is a 2011 Iranian crime drama film directed and written by Houman Seyyedi.

== Plot ==
Three young criminals are ordered to keep a girl inside a house until her brother pays his debts.

== Cast ==
- Shahab Hosseini as Shahab
- Javad Ezzati as Shahram
- Amir Jadidi as Kasra
- Azadeh Samadi
- Mina Sadati
- Omid Tabrizi Zadeh
- Mansour Shahbazi
