= Mohammadreza Solati =

Iranian actor and voice actor

- محمدرضا صولتی
- Born: 27 May 1975 (age 51); Mashhad, Iran
- Other name: رضا صولتی
- Occupations: Actor and voice actor
- Years active: 2004–present
- Known for: SpongeBob SquarePants voice actor in Iran
- Notable work

Mohammadreza Solati (Persian: محمدرضا صولتی, born 27 May in Mashhad) is an Iranian actor and voice actor

He became a famous voice in Iran by dubbing the animated character SpongeBob.

== Career ==
Solati started dubbing in 2004. After a while, he joined the "Young Speakers Association" and seriously pursued the narration of animation works. Solati is one of the speakers who has the ability to speak. In the animation Shark Tale, he has typed three main characters (Lenny, Ernie, Bernie) and four sub-characters.

== Dubbing ==
=== Dubbing in Iran ===
- Jumanji: Welcome to the Jungle
- Cars (Mater)
- The Lion King (timon)
- SpongeBob SquarePants (All male characters)
- Toy Story (Woody)
- Ice Age (Sid)
- Joker (Joker)
- Big Hero 6 (police and wasabi)
- Sniper: Ghost Shooter
- Tom and Jerry Meet Sherlock Holmes (Sherlock Holmes)
- Batman: The Brave and the Bold (Tom Kenny, Kevin Michael Richardson)
- Timon & Pumbaa (Timon Dubbing Manager)
- Phineas and Ferb (Daphne Schmidt)
- The Batman (animated series) (The Joker and the Penguin, Kevin Michael Richardson and Tom Kenny)
- Supergirl
- Batman: The Animated Series (Joker and Penguin)
- The Devil All the Time (movie)
- Hacker Dubbing Director
- Mulan
- Hellboy (2019 movie) Dubbing Director
- Scoob! (Scooby)
- Capture series
- The Grinch (2018 movie) (Grinch character)
- Split (2016 movie)
- Daltons (atmosphere)
- Doolittle (movie) (Doolittle character)
- Operation Nuts Dubbing Manager
- Mirza Balad Animation (Dubbing Manager)
- Teenage Mutant Ninja Turtles (2007) (Dubbing Director)
- Race (Movie 2019) (Dubbing Director and Character (Menk)
- Enola Holmes

== Filmography ==
- Siavash (2021)
- chesh mo gosh basteh film (2019)
- Safar e Sohrab
- Homa and sister
- divar be divar (2016)

== Awards and nominations ==
- Winning the statuette of the best male actor in the 34th Fajr Theater Festival for his performances in the plays "Darkness" and "Cold Fever on a Hot Forehead". (2015)
- Award for Best Actor at the 35th Fajr Theater Festival for his performances in "Oxygen" and "Phoenix Orphanage". (2016)
