= Bachelors (TV series) =

Iranian TV series

- لیسانسه‌ها
- Genre: Comedy
- Written by: Soroush Sehhat; Iman Safaee
- Directed by: Soroush Sehhat
- Starring: Hootan Shakiba; Amir Hossein Rostami; Amir Kazemi; Kazem Sayahi; Matin Sotoudeh; Bijan Banafshekhah; Roya Mirelmi
- Theme music composer: Omid Nemati
- Composer: Behnood Yakhchali
- Country of origin: Iran
- Original language: Persian
- No. of seasons: 3
- No. of episodes: 97

Production
- Producer: Reza Joudi
- Production location: Tehran
- Cinematography: Khosrow Dadgarmaram
- Editor: Mehdi Joudi
- Running time: 40 minutes

Original release
- Network: IRIB 3
- Release: 25 December 2016 – 7 December 2019

Bachelors (Persian: لیسانسه‌ها, romanized: Lisanseha) is an Iranian Comedy television series directed by Soroush Sehhat, written by Sehhat and Iman Safaee, starring Hootan Shakiba, Amir Hossein Rostami, Amir Kazemi, Kazem Sayahi, Matin Sotoudeh, Bijan Banafshekhah, and Roya Mirelmi. The series aired on IRIB 3 from December 25, 2016, to December 7, 2019, lasting three seasons.

== Storyline ==
Three young bachelors each have problems. One is thinking about immigration, one is looking to make a living, and the third looking for housing. Maziyar Rahmati (Amir Kazemi) lives in a broken family. His parents are divorced, his father is a drug addict, and he himself is thinking of migrating. Then he learns that he has cancer and can no longer migrate. Habib Naghavi (Hootan Shakiba) is a rich man who is very interested in marriage but due to his weakness in establishing social relations, he has not been able to choose a wife yet. Masoud Sharifian (Amir Hossein Rostami) on the eve of marrying Taraneh (Matin Sotoudeh) needs some money for housing and is looking for a job, On the other hand, he has disagreements with his future father-in-law (Bijan Banafshehkhah). The story revolves around the problems of the three people and strange events.

== Cast ==
- Hootan Shakiba as Habib Naghavi
- Amir Hossein Rostami as Masoud Sharifian
- Amir Kazemi as Maziar Rahmani
- Kazem Sayahi as Rahim Rahmati
- Matin Sotoudeh as Taraneh Mohajer
- Bijan Banafshekhah as Mahmoud Mohajer
- Roya Mirelmi as Fereshteh Rahimi
- Behnam Tashakkor as Farid Rahimi
- Ezzatollah Mehravaran as Abbas Naghavi
- Siavash Cheraghipour as Amiri
- Bizhan Emkanian
- Mehran Rajabi
- Ateneh Faghih Nasiri
- Tabasom Hashemi
- Sam Derakhshani
- Sogol Ghalatian
- Farkhondeh Farmanizadeh
- Maryam Sarmadi
- Siavash Cheraghipour
- Ardeshir Kazemi
- Erfan Barzin
- Neda Nour
