= The Notebook (TV series) =

2023–2024 Iranian television series

- Persian: دفتر یادداشت
- Genre: Comedy-drama; Crime; Mystery
- Created by: Kiarash Asadizadeh
- Written by: Masoud Khakbaz
- Starring: Reza Attaran; Hassan Majouni; Sogol Khaligh; Kazem Sayahi; Mina Sadati; Zahra Davoudnezhad; Bijan Banafshekhah
- Music by: Behnam Rad
- Country of origin: Iran
- Original language: Persian
- No. of seasons: 1
- No. of episodes: 16

Production
- Producer: Hossein Akbari
- Cinematography: Ali Ghazi
- Editor: Mohammad Najarian
- Running time: 43–53 minutes

Original release
- Network: Filmnet
- Release: 17 November 2023 – 8 March 2024

The Notebook (Persian: دفتر یادداشت, romanized: Daftar Yaddasht) is an Iranian television series written by Masoud Khakbaz and directed by Kiarash Asadizadeh, and starring Reza Attaran, Hassan Majouni, Sogol Khaligh, Kazem Sayahi, and Mina Sadati. The first episode premiered on Filmnet on November 17, 2023.

== Synopsis ==
Iraj Majd (Reza Attaran), who was a famous detective in his youth, now lives in the nursing home of Monir Salehi (Mina Sadati), due to his Alzheimer. One day, his close friend, Hamid Mozhdeh (Hassan Majouni), comes to the nursing home and takes him home from there. Hamid explains to Iraj that his sister died a few months ago and he was her lawyer. Hamid gives him the notebook that his sister Simin (Azita Hajian) left for him so that he can write everything in it and not forget. Iraj insists to Hamid to take him to the place where his sister died. When he gets there, he finds a sign under the carpet where Simin died, a sign written in the notebook that Simin uses to declare death or danger. Iraj is sure that her death was not natural and that his sister was murdered.

== Cast ==
- Reza Attaran as Iraj Majd
- Hassan Majouni as Hamid Mozhdeh
- Sogol Khaligh as Nazanin Majd
- Kazem Sayahi as Qorab
- Mina Sadati as Monir Salehi
- Zahra Davoudnezhad as Rouhangiz
- Bijan Banafshekhah as Naser
- Dariush Kardan as Bijan Najafi / Shams
- Ardeshir Rostami as Tiam
- Pasha Rostami as Amir
- Azita Hajian as Simin
- Fariba Motekhases as Sho'le Maleki
- Maryam Sa'adat as Mahin
- Shamsi Fazllolahi as Mrs. Amani
- Fatemeh Neishabouri as Mrs. Khalili
- Farnoosh Nikandish as Shahin Darband
- Toufan Mehrdadian as Sho'le's employer
- Nahid Moslemi as

== Reception ==
=== Awards and nominations ===
| Award | Year | Category | Recipient | Result | Ref(s) |
|---|---|---|---|---|---|
| Hafez Awards | 2024 | Best Actor – Television Series Comedy | Reza Attaran | Nominated | |
| Hafez Awards | 2024 | Best Actress – Television Series Comedy | Sogol Khaligh | Won | |
| Hafez Awards | 2024 | Best Technical and Artistic Achievement | Ali Ghazi | Nominated | |
| Hafez Awards | 2024 | Best Technical and Artistic Achievement | Mohsen Nasrollahi | Nominated | |
