= Peyman Abadi =

Iranian stuntman

- پیمان جلالی ابدی
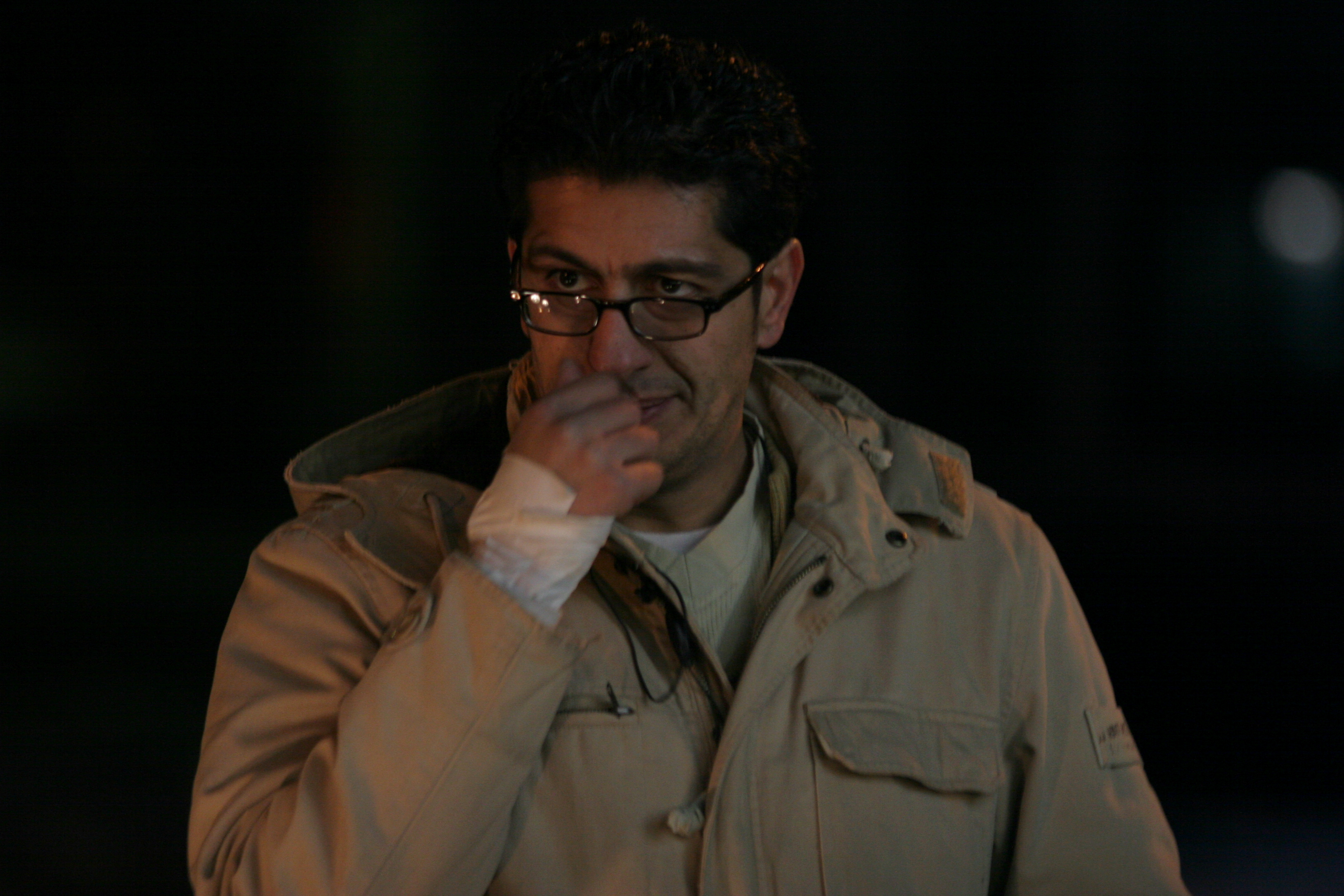
- Abadi behind the scenes of the TV series Rahe Bipayan in 2006
- Born: 2 November 1972; Tehran, Iran
- Died: 6 May 2009 (aged 36); Tehran, Iran
- Occupation: Stuntman

Peyman Jalali Abadi (Persian: پیمان جلالی ابدی) was an Iranian stuntman actor. He started his career in Germany, particularly in the TV series Alarm für Cobra 11 – Die Autobahnpolizei. He later returned to Iran and worked in various movies and TV series, including Rahe Bipayan, Hoosh-e Siah, and Rooz-e Hasrat.

He died in 2009 in an accident during the filming of the movie Invisible Eyes, when a bus he was supposed to jump out of overturned, rolled down a slope and went into flames.

== Partial filmography ==
Television

- Alarm für Cobra 11 – Die Autobahnpolizei
- Hoosh-e Siah
- Rahe Bipayan

== Notes and references ==
- گزارش خبرگزاری‌ها از پایان «پیمان ابدی». Pendar. Archived from the original on 2009-05-15.
- پیمان ابدی» بدلکار تلویزیون جان باخت». Fars News. 2009-05-06.
- پیمان ابدی و عوامل فیلم هر دو مقصرند. Tabnak. Archived from the original on 2009-05-17.
- پيمان ابدی. Soureh Cinema.
