= The Load =

2018 film by Ognjen Glavonić

- Film poster
- Serbian: Терет
- Directed by: Ognjen Glavonić
- Screenplay by: Ognjen Glavonić
- Produced by: Stefan Ivančić; Dragana Jovović; Ognjen Glavonić; Sophie Erbs; Ankica Jurić Tilić; Pouria Heidary Oureh
- Starring: Leon Lučev
- Cinematography: Tatjana Krstevski
- Edited by: Jelena Maksimović
- Production companies: Non-Aligned Films; Cinéma Defacto; Kinorama; Three Gardens Film
- Distributed by: New Europe Film Sales; Grasshopper Film (US); La Aventura (Spain); Five Stars (Serbia)
- Release dates: 12 May 2018 (Cannes); November 2018 (Serbia)
- Running time: 98 minutes
- Countries: Serbia; France; Croatia; Iran; Qatar
- Language: Serbian
- Box office: $28,410

The Load (Serbian: Терет, romanized: Teret) is a 2018 Serbian war drama film directed by Ognjen Glavonić. It was selected to screen in the Directors' Fortnight section at the 2018 Cannes Film Festival. It also won the Golden Pram Award for Best Feature Film at the 2018 Zagreb Film Festival.

== Plot ==
During the 1999 NATO bombing of Kosovo, Vlada is a middle aged man hired to act as a courier to Belgrade through Kosovo of a mysterious truck transport, the contents of which are left undisclosed to him. This being his third excursion driving, he’s advised not to stop for any reason once he departs. After being dropped off at the site where the truck waits for him, he begins his journey but is soon rerouted by a burning car wreck at a bridge, forcing him to detour to a nearby riverbed.

He finds a group of refugees who give him directions and one sells him cigarettes. A young man named Paja approaches him asking to ride with him to Belgrade and offers to guide him along the route from the countryside to Belgrade. Vlada refuses to take him and departs. Once on the road, he realizes that Paja has hitched a ride by standing on the back of the truck and after pulling over, Paja begs him to let him be inside the truck since he’s freezing outside, which Vlada quietly allows.

During their journey, the two witness the ravages of war-torn Kosovo and learn about each other, both coming from upstanding traditional background but otherwise being very different. Paja shares the music he’s made with his band via cassette and headphones, which Vlada commends him on. After admitting to Paja he doesn’t know (nor does he want to know), what’s being transported, as well as narrowly avoiding apprehension by law enforcement, Paja decides to leave the truck short of Belgrade. Before leaving Paja gives him the cassette and tells him to reach out should he ever want to join him. He’s last shown on his own in a decrepit playground as nightfall surrounds him with nowhere to go.

Vlada arrives at his destination successfully and is compensated. As he makes his way through a government office building where he makes a phone call and relaxes, he sees through a window soldiers unloading dead bodies from the truck and piling them into a mass grave.

He sleeps on a waiting area couch in the building and is woken up by an officer who is involved in the transport who orders him to return the truck after washing the cargo hold.

He returns to his wife and teenage son Ivan to discuss what their options are with the bombings continuing for an indeterminate time. He makes attempts to bond with his son but finds that he is emotionally estranged from him. After telling Ivan the story of how his father and uncle were affected by World War II, he gives him the cassette tape, which Ivan is seen listening to with a friend, closing the film saying “I want to start a band.”

== Cast ==
- Leon Lučev as Vlada
- Pavle Čemerikić
- Tamara Krcunović
- Ivan Lučev
- Igor Benčina

== Reception ==
=== Critical response ===
Review aggregator website Rotten Tomatoes reports an approval rating of 100% based on 27 reviews, with an average rating of 8.4/10. The site's critics' consensus reads: "The Load (Teret) sifts through the wreckage of a horrific conflict to tell the story of a man faced with impossible choices -- and their consequences." Metacritic reports an aggregated score of 75/100 based on 8 critics, indicating "generally favorable reviews".

=== Accolades ===
Event	Category	Recipients	Result
Cannes Film Festival	Caméra d'Or	The Load	Nominated
Sarajevo Film Festival	Heart of Sarajevo for Best Actor	Leon Lučev	Won
Sarajevo Film Festival	Heart of Sarajevo for Best Film	The Load	Nominated
Zagreb Film Festival	Golden Pram for Best Film	The Load	Won
Stockholm International Film Festival	Bronze Horse for Best Film	The Load	Nominated
New Horizons Film Festival	Grand Prix	The Load	Nominated
Marrakech International Film Festival	Golden Star: Best Director	Ognjen Glavonić	Won
Marrakech International Film Festival	Golden Star: Best Film	The Load	Nominated
São Paulo International Film Festival	New Directors Competition	The Load	Nominated
Art Film Fest	Best Director	Ognjen Glavonić	Won
Gijón International Film Festival	Grand Prix Asturias	The Load	Nominated
Haifa International Film Festival	FEDEORA for Best International Film	The Load	Won
Haifa International Film Festival	Best Film	The Load	Nominated
Ljubljana International Film Festival	Special Mention	The Load	Won
Ljubljana International Film Festival	Kingfisher Award for Best Film	The Load	Nominated
Belgrade Auteur Film Festival	Grand Prix 'Aleksandar Saša Petrović'	The Load	Won
Kyiv International Film Festival "Molodist"	Special Jury Diploma	The Load	Won
Kyiv International Film Festival "Molodist"	Best Feature Film	The Load	Nominated
