= Rhino (TV series) =

2019–2020 Iranian television series

- Persian: کرگدن
- Genre: Drama; Crime; Action
- Created by: Kiarash Asadizadeh
- Written by: Ali Asghari; Mehrdad Kouroshnia
- Directed by: Kiarash Asadizadeh
- Starring: Mostafa Zamani; Sara Bahrami; Hoda Zeinolabedin; Pouria Rahimisam; Banipal Shoomoon; Pantea Panahiha; Kazem Sayahi; Elham Korda; Setareh Pesyani; Mohammad Amin
- Music by: Ali Shahbazi
- Country of origin: Iran
- Original language: Persian
- No. of seasons: 1
- No. of episodes: 26

Production
- Producer: Sadegh Yari
- Cinematography: Mohammad Rasouli
- Running time: 49–56 minutes

Original release
- Network: Filimo; Namava
- Release: 7 November 2019 – 30 April 2020

Rhino (Persian: کرگدن, romanized: Kargadan) is an Iranian television series written by Ali Asghari, and Mehrdad Kouroshnia and directed by Kiarash Asadizadeh. It features an ensemble cast which includes Mostafa Zamani, Sara Bahrami, Hoda Zeinolabedin, Pouria Rahimisam, Banipal Shoomoon, Pantea Panahiha, Kazem Sayahi, Elham Korda, Setareh Pesyani, and Mohammad Amin. The series was released every Thursday on Filimo and Namava from November 7, 2019, to April 30, 2020.

== Cast ==
- Mostafa Zamani as Navid
- Sara Bahrami as Raha / Najmeh
- Hoda Zeinolabedin as Gisoo
- Pouria Rahimisam as Kazem
- Banipal Shoomoon as Danial
- Pantea Panahiha as Vanousheh Azimi
- Kazem Sayahi as Mark / Mehran Ark
- Elham Korda as Kiana Moradi / Simin
- Setareh Pesyani as Nazanin
- Mohammad Amin as Afshin
- Mehdi Koushki as Kourosh
- Nader Falah as Taher
- Sharareh Dolatabadi as Giti
- Masoumeh Ghasemipour as Homeira Otadi
- Majid Aghakarimi as Behnam
- Bijan Afshar as Masoud Parto
- Amir Samavati as Rasoul Sabeti
- Taranom Kermanian as Baran
- Mehrdad Niknam as Mehrdad
- Ali Milani as Khan Amoo
- Morteza Aghahosseini as Ahmad Sabeti
- Amir Janani as Jalal
- Shamsi Sadeghi as Katayoun
- Bahador Zamani as Pouya Sarmadi
- Saman Darabi as Saman Dadfar

== Release ==
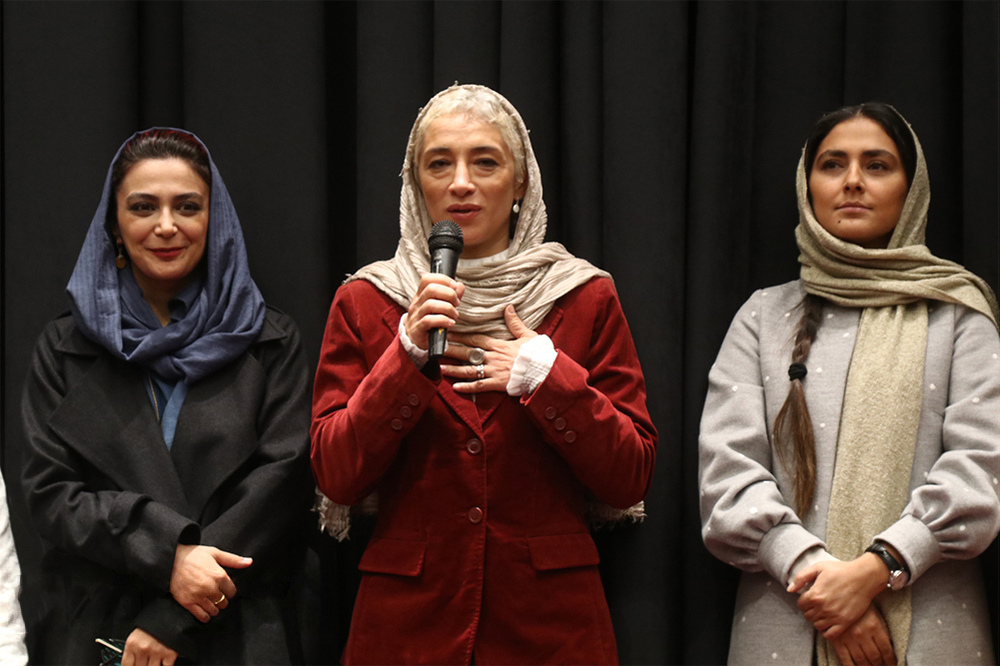
From left: Elham Korda, Pantea Panahiha, and Hoda Zeinolabedin

The first episode was premiered in the Farabi Cinema Foundation with the actors of the series on November 7, 2019.
