= Roya Mirelmi =

Iranian actress (born 1978)

- رؤیا میرعلمی
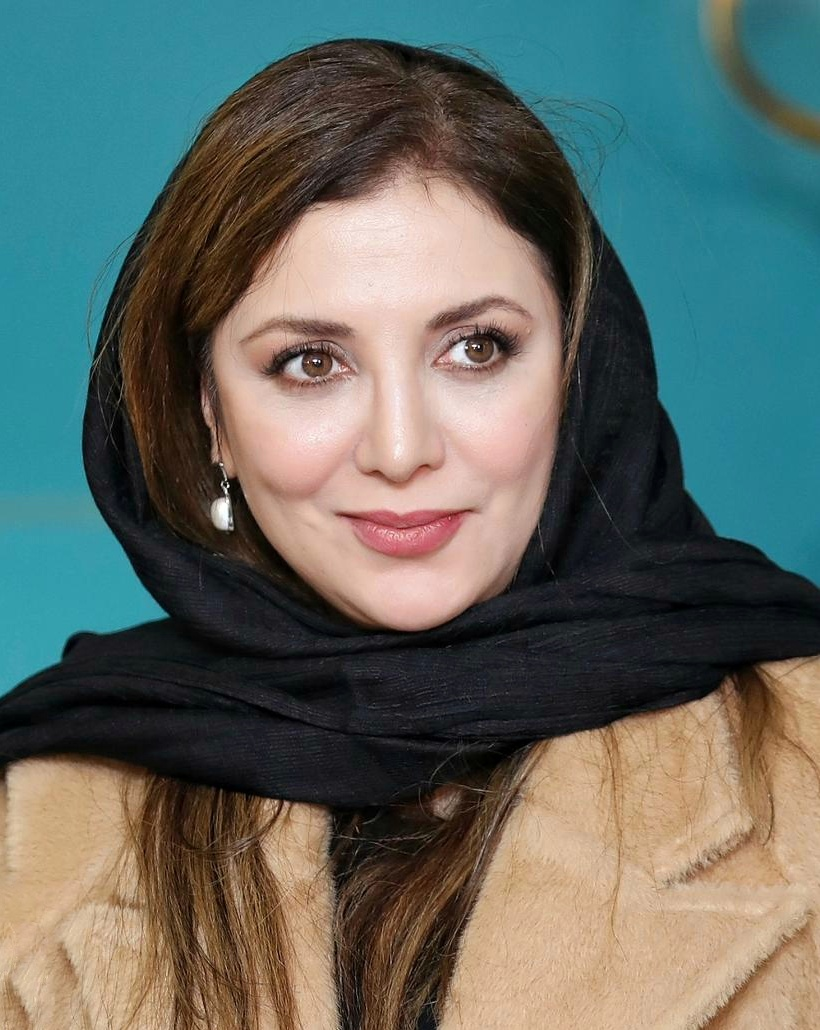
- Mirelmi at the 2025 Fajr Film Festival
- Born: 1 September 1978 (age 48); Qazvin, Iran
- Education: University of Tehran (BFA)
- Occupation: Actress
- Years active: 1999–present
- Children: 1

Roya Mirelmi (Persian: رؤیا میرعلمی; born September 1, 1978) is an Iranian actress. She is best known for her roles in Pelargonium (2015) and Bachelors (2016–2018), the latter earned her a Hafez Award for Best Actress in a Comedy Television Series. She received the best actress in television series comedy award from Hafez Awards in 2018.

== Filmography ==
=== Film ===
Year	Title	Role	Director	Notes	Ref(s)
2014	Dreamy	Secretary Salari	Fereydoun Jeyrani		
2020	Shahre Gheseh Cinema		Keyvan Alimohammadi, Ali Akbar Heidari		
2025	Cloture		Soheil Moafagh		

=== Web ===
Year	Title	Role	Director	Platform	Notes	Ref(s)
2020	Mafia Nights	Herself	Saeed Aboutaleb	Filimo	Game show; 3 episodes	
2024	Oscar	Herself	Mehran Modiri	Filimo	Game show; 4 episodes	
2024	Ahangi Night	Herself	Hamed Ahangi	Filmnet	Talk show; 1 episode	
2024	Joker	Herself	Ehsan Alikhani	Filimo	Game show; 6 episodes	

=== Television ===
Year	Title	Role	Director	Network	Notes	Ref(s)
2015	Pelargonium	Ziba Sa'adati	Soroush Sehhat	IRIB TV3	Main role	
2016–2018	Bachelors	Fereshteh Rahimi	Soroush Sehhat	IRIB TV3	Supporting role; season 1 & 2	
2018	Lovers		Manouchehr Hadi	IRIB TV3		
2022–2023	Mastouran	Jahandokht	Jamal Seyyed Hatami, Masoud Abparvar, Ali Hashemi	IRIB TV1	Main role	
2024–2025	Mahyar Ayyar	Marsha	Jamal Seyyed Hatami	IRIB TV3	Supporting role	

== Awards and nominations ==
Name of the award ceremony, year presented, category, nominee of the award, and the result of the nomination
Award	Year	Category	Nominated Work	Result	Ref.
Hafez Awards	2018	Best Actress – Television Series Comedy	Bachelors	Won	
