= Seven and a Half (2019 film) =

- Film poster
- Directed by: Navid Mahmoudi
- Written by: Navid Mahmoudi
- Produced by: Jamshid Mahmoudi Alireza Bagherbeigi (executive)
- Starring: Neda Jebraeili; Hasti Mahdavifar; Fereshteh Hosseini; Sheida Khaligh; Anahita Afshar; Afsaneh Kamali; Matin Heydarinia
- Cinematography: Mehran Mamdooh
- Edited by: Nima Jafari Jozani
- Music by: Sahand Mehdizadeh
- Production company: Aseman Parvaz Film
- Distributed by: DreamLab Films
- Release date: October 3, 2019 (BIFF)
- Running time: 75 minutes
- Country: Iran
- Language: Persian

Seven and a Half (Persian: هفت و نیم, romanized: Hafto-Nim) is a 2019 Iranian drama film directed and written by Navid Mahmoudi and produced by Jamshid Mahmoudi. The film screened for the first time at the 24th Busan International Film Festival.

== Premise ==
The film tells the story of the lives of seven Afghan and Iranian girls in seven episodes in a sequence of plots, and is the story of girls whose wedding is scheduled to take place on Friday night, but each of whom is involved in a problem in some way.

== Cast ==
''Shabaneh'' Episode

- Neda Jebraeili as Shabaneh
- Shadi Mokhtari as Hediyeh
- Atieh Javid as Ms. Saleh

''Negar'' Episode

- Hasti Mahdavifar as Negar
- Mohammad Reza Ghaffari as Mehrab

''Fereshteh'' Episode

- Fereshteh Hosseini as Fereshteh
- Hossein Mehri as Behzad
- Roya Javidnia as Doctor

''Niloufar'' Episode

- Sheida Khaligh as Niloufar
- Alireza Ostadi as Niloufar's Father

''Nahid'' Episode

- Anahita Afshar as Nahid
- Alireza Kamali Nejad as Salar

''Rahil'' Episode

- Afsaneh Kamali as Rahil
- Zahra Behrouzmanesh as Somayeh
- Mahsa Hemati as Emergency Doctor

''Shekar'' Episode

- Matin Heydarinia as Saeed
- Rozhan Taghi Zadeh as Mina
