= Azadeh Samadi =

Iranian actress (born 1979)

- آزاده صمدی
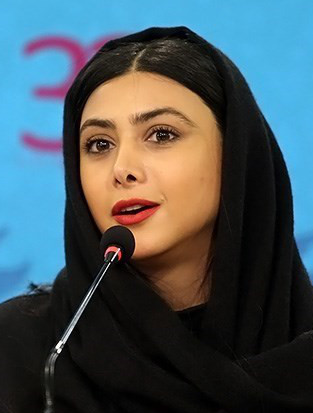
- Samadi at the 2014 Fajr Film Festival
- Born: January 7, 1979 (age 47); Lahijan, Gilan, Iran
- Occupation: Actress
- Years active: 2006–present
- Spouse: Houman Seyyedi (m. 2007; div. 2014)

Azadeh Samadi (Persian: آزاده صمدی; born 7 January 1979) is an Iranian actress. She has received various accolades, including a Fajr Film Festival Honorary Diploma, in addition to nominations for a Hafez Award, a Crystal Simorgh, and an Iran's Film Critics and Writers Association Award.

== Early life ==
Azadeh Samadi was born on September 8, 1979, in Lahijan. After completing her undergraduate theater studies at Soore University, she completed a course of acting classes (supervised by Parviz Parastooi). She played in the theater production Behir and Sugar, and after some time was chosen to play in the TV series The Endless Way directed by Homayoun Asadiyan. She has performed in the short films 35 meter water level and blue teeth, directed by Hooman Seyyed as well as No One Talking to Anyone.

Azadeh Samadi married Houman Seyyedi in 2006. But this marriage ended in divorce in 2013. Azadeh Samadi was one of the artists supporting Mir Hossein Mousavi during the 2009 presidential election.

Samadi hosted the Zabiwaka program, which was broadcast on the Iowa Internet network for the 2018 World Cup in Russia. And Behrang Alavi, as his replacement, took over the implementation of this program. According to the agents close to this program, while Azadeh Samadi was supposed to be the host of this program, it was announced by the Radio and Television. As a result, it was decided to change her.

== Personal life ==
Azadeh Samadi, an Iranian actress, married fellow actor Hooman Seyedi after they collaborated in the TV series Rahe Bi Payan (Endless Path). However, after several years together, the marriage ended in divorce.

== Controversies ==
=== Zabivaka ===
Azadeh Samadi hosted the program Zabivaka, which was broadcast on the online platform Ayo for the 2018 FIFA World Cup in Russia. After the first episode, supervisors from the Islamic Republic of Iran Broadcasting (IRIB) halted Samadi's participation during the second episode, citing concerns over the "instrumental use of women." Majid Yaser and Ali Ansarian took over as hosts of the program.

=== Opposition to Mandatory Hijab ===
On May 21, 2023, Azadeh Samadi attended the funeral of Reza Haddad without adhering to Iran's mandatory hijab policy, an action that was widely praised by social media users. Following this event, the prosecutor at Tehran's Culture and Media Court issued an order for Samadi's indictment, charging her with violating public morals and decency due to her non-compliance with the mandatory hijab. Samadi was subsequently convicted and sentenced to a six-month ban from social media activities, whether directly or through intermediaries. Additionally, she was required to attend biweekly sessions at an official psychological center for treatment of what the court described as "antisocial personality disorder" and to submit a certificate of mental health upon completion of the treatment period.

=== Travel Ban ===
In late November 2023, Azadeh Samadi was barred from leaving Iran while traveling to the 54th International Film Festival of India (IFFI) in Goa.

== Filmography ==
=== Film ===
Year	Title	Role	Director	Notes	Ref(s)
2010	Africa	Shirin	Houman Seyyedi		
2014	Thirteen	Sami	Houman Seyyedi		
2014	Sensitive Floor	Mahin Kamali	Kamal Tabrizi		
2015	Arghavan	Leili	Omid Bonakdar and Keyvan Alimohammadi		
2015	Sometimes	Abrisham Afrashteh	Mohammad Reza Rahmani		
2015	Fifty Kilos of Cherries	Arousha Azhdari	Mani Haghighi		
2017	The Good, the Bad & the Corny	Mozhdeh Ghanbarzade	Peyman GhasemKhani		
2017	Lobby		Mohammad Parvizi	Unreleased film	
2017	5 Afternoon	Mahnaz Paris	Mehran Modiri		
2018	All Through the Night	Shohreh	Farzad Motamen		
2018	Sly	Mitra	Kamal Tabrizi		
2019	Under the Supervision	Giti	Majid Salehi		
2023	Sima's Unfinished Narration	Laleh	Alireza Samadi		
2023	Equator		Asghar Naeemi		
2023	Aziz	Marzieh	Majid Tavakoli		
2024	When You Were Not Here		Kaveh Sajjadi Hosseini		
2025	Saddam	Halimeh	Pedram Pouramiri		

=== Web ===
Year	Title	Role	Director	Platform	Ref(s)
2017	The Excellency	Leila Mazaher	Sam Gharibian	Video CD	
2019	Blue Whale	Haleh	Fereydoun Jeyrani	Filimo	
2021	I Want to Live	Zohreh Afshar	Sharam Shah Hosseini	Filimo	
2023	Set Me Free	Naghmeh	Shahram Shah Hosseini	Filimo	
2024	Viper of Tehran	Elahe	Saman Moghaddam	Filmnet	
2024	The Asphalt Jungle	Atefeh	Pejman Teymourtash	Namava	
2025	Savushun		Narges Abyar	Namava	

=== Television ===
- Divar be Divar - 2016
- Tehran's roof - 2015
- one among all - 2009
- Gawsandogh - 2008
- Rahe Bipayan - 2007

== Theatre ==
Samadi acted in Iceland (play) was written by Nicolas Billon.

- Iceland
- No Audience
- Five second snow
- Without milk and sugar (Hamid Amjad)
- Constitutional Lady (Hossein Kiani)
- Sea travelers (Mohammad Aqbati)
- The unfinished narrative of a suspended chapter (Houman Seyyedi)
- After all, whose life is this? (Ashkan Khelinejad)
- A little click (Ahmad Soleimani)
- Show P2 (Morteza Mirmontazemi)
- Rainy City Melody (Hadi Marzban)
- Show original language (Rasoul Kahani)
- Dream show of a midnight night (Mustafa Koushki)
- Five seconds of snow (Morteza Mir Montazemi)
- Iceland (Aida Kikhaei)
- Love letters from the Middle East (Kiomars Moradi)
- Without spectators (Ali Sarabi)

== Awards and nominations ==
Year	Award	Category	Nominated work	Result
2010	29th Fajr Film Festival	Best Actress	Africa	Won

== See also ==
- Cinema of Iran
