= Won't You Cry? =

- Film poster
- Directed by: Alireza Motamedi
- Written by: Alireza Motamedi
- Produced by: Reza Mohaghegh
- Starring: Alireza Motamedi; Baran Kosari; Fereshteh Hosseini; Hanieh Tavassoli; Mani Haghighi; Ali Mosaffa
- Release date: October 21, 2022 (Mostra)
- Running time: 86 minutes
- Country: Iran
- Language: Persian

Won't You Cry? (Persian: چرا گریه نمی‌کنی؟, romanized: Chera Geryeh Nemikoni?) is a 2022 Iranian drama film directed and written by Alireza Motamedi. Led by Motamedi, the film features an ensemble cast including Baran Kosari, Fereshteh Hosseini, Hanieh Tavassoli, Mani Haghighi, Ali Mosaffa, Linda Kiani, Nahal Dashti and Amir Hossein Fathi. The film had its world premiere at the 43rd São Paulo International Film Festival and its premiere in Iran at the 41st Fajr International Film Festival.

== Summary ==
Ali, a sport’s writer, can’t cry over his brother’s death. Haunted by its memory through his daily life, he quits his job and ends up being the focus of interest of his family and friends who worry about him.

== Cast ==
- Alireza Motamedi as Ali
- Baran Kosari
- Fereshteh Hosseini
- Hanieh Tavassoli
- Mani Haghighi
- Ali Mosaffa
- Linda Kiani
- Nahal Dashti
- Amirhossein Fathi
