= Kazem Sayahi =

Iranian actor (born 1979)

- کاظم سیاحی
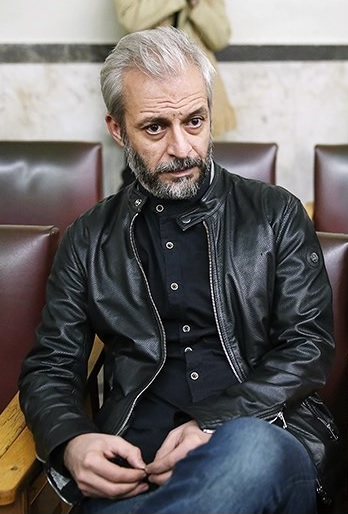
- Sayahi in 2017
- Born: Kazem Sayahi Saharkhiz; January 20, 1979 (age 47); Mahallat, Markazi, Iran
- Education: Azad University (BFA)
- Occupations: Actor; director; former makeup artist
- Years active: 1998–present

Kazem Sayahi Saharkhiz (Persian: کاظم سیاحی سحرخیز; born January 20, 1979) is an Iranian actor. He is best known for his two critically acclaimed collaborations with Iranian director Iraj Tahmasb in Red Hat (2012–2018), and Party (2022–2024), for which he gained acclaim and became well known. Sayahi gained wider recognition and received critical praise for his role as Rahim Rahmati, an addict father in the comedy television series Bachelors (2016–2019), which earned him a Hafez Award nomination.

Following this breakthrough, he starred in the crime action series Rhino (2019–2020), the comedy fantasy series You Only Go Around Once (2023), and the comedy crime series The Notebook (2023–2024). He has also appeared in films such as Sensitive Floor and City of Mice 2 (both 2014), Lantouri (2016), Dance with Me (2019), and The Town (2022).

== Early life and education ==
Kazem Sayahi Saharkhiz was born on January 20, 1979 in Mahallat, Markazi, Iran. He received a Bachelor's degree in acting from Islamic Azad University, Central Tehran Branch.

== Filmography ==
=== Film ===
Year	Title	Role	Director	Notes	Ref(s)
2013	Root Canal	The Best Friend	Samira Eskandarfar		
2014	Sensitive Floor	Jalal	Kamal Tabrizi		
2014	City of Mice 2	Dom Barik (voice)	Marzieh Boroumand		
2016	Lantouri	Akbar Ardalan	Reza Dormishian		
2016	Hangover		Dariush Ghazbani		
2016	Arvand	Hossein	Pourya Azarbayjani		
2017	Online Shopping	Buyer	Ghasideh Golmakani	Short film	
2018	11:40	The Man	Fatah Minoobakhsh	Short film	
2019	Dance with Me	Bahman	Soroush Sehhat		
2020	Headless		Kaveh Sajjadi Hosseini		
2021	Half Distance	Kaveh	Elham Rad	Short film	
2021	Play		Ali Gitinavard	Short film	
2022	2888	(voice)	Keyvan Alimohammadi, Ali Akbar Heydari		
2022	The Town	The Assistant Director	Ali Hazrati		
2025	The Legend of Sepehr	(voice)	Emad Rahmani, Mehrdad Mehrabi	Animated film	
2025	The House of Ghosts	Shahrokh	Kiarash Asadizadeh	Completed in 2020	
2026	Swimming Pool		Soroush Sehhat		
2026	Slumber	Malek	Mani Moghaddam		
2026	Idol		Hamid Nematollah		
TBA	48FM		Kiarash Asadizadeh	Completed in 2018	

=== Web ===
Year	Title	Role	Director	Platform	Notes	Ref(s)
2019–2020	Rhino	Mehran "Mark" Ark	Kiarash Asadizadeh	Filimo, Namava	Main role	
2021	Red Square	Garo	Ebrahim Ebrahimian	Filimo	Recurring role; 6 episodes	
2021–2022	Island	Payam Kianfar	Sirous Moghaddam	Filimo	Supporting role; 14 episodes	
2022–2023	Party	Pasheh (voice)	Iraj Tahmasb	Filimo, Namava	Main role; 60 episodes	
2023	You Only Go Around Once	Shahram Rabbani	Soroush Sehhat	Filimo, Namava	Main role	
2023–2024	The Notebook	Qorab	Kiarash Asadizadeh	Filmnet	Main role; 15 episodes	

=== Television ===
Year	Title	Role	Director	Network	Notes	Ref(s)
2002	Without Description		Mehdi Mazloumi	IRIB TV3	as Makeup artist assistant	
2003–2004	Acacia Alley	Mansour, Alireza (substitute)	Reza Attaran	IRIB TV5	Recurring role, also as Makeup artist assistant	
2007	Detectives	Omid	Hamid Labkhandeh	IRIB TV3	Episode: "Mr. Chief"	
2010	Secretes of a House	Mehran Mohseni	Hamid Labkhandeh	IRIB TV4	Episode: "Stop the World"	
2011	One Name	Hamed Ezzati	Bijan Mirbagheri	IRIB TV5	Television film	
2011	The Deed	Ezzat	Mohsen Yousefi	IRIB TV1	Television film	
2011	Greeting	Teacher Javadi	Saeed Ebrahimifar	IRIB TV2	Main role; 8 episodes	
2012–2015, 2018	Red Hat	Jigar, Geda (voice)	Iraj Tahmasb	IRIB TV2	Main role; 97 episodes	
2013	Davaran	Saman	Ahmad Amini	IRIB TV2	Guest role; 2 episodes	
2016	Notes of a Housewife	Fazel	Masoud Keramati	IRIB TV5	Main role; 19 episodes	
2016–2017	Sugarland Puppets	Behloul, Nozad, Bia, Sarbaz (voice)	Mohammad Foad Safarianpour	IRIB Nasim	Main role; 57 episodes	
2016–2019	Bachelors	Rahim Rahmati	Soroush Sehhat	IRIB TV3	TV series	
2019	Special Condition	Arzhang Fayaz	Vahid Amirkhani	IRIB TV3	Main role; 13 episodes	
2024	Party	Pasheh / Jigar (voice)	Iraj Tahmasb	IRIB Nasim	Main role; 30 episodes	

== Theatre ==
Year	Title	Playwright	Director	Stage	Ref(s)
1998	Vagabond		Hamid Reza Zare	(Arak)	
–	Ortolan in the Cage		Faramarz Yeganeh		
–	Summer Children		Faramarz Yeganeh		
–	The Morning of the Fortieth Day		Hamid Zare		
–	Magic and Spell		Hamid Zare		
–	Summery		Faramarz Yeganeh		
–	Blind War		Faramarz Yeganeh		
–	From Dream to Moonlight	Chista Yasrebi			
2004–2005	The Emigrants	Sławomir Mrożek	Sanaz Bayan	City Theater of Tehran, New Hall	
2006	Dramas of Life	Babak Mohammadi	Babak Mohammadi	Niavaran Cultural Center	
2006–2007	Romantic Jezghalehs	Mehdi Mirmohammadi	Ali Hashemi	Theater Department - Drama House	
2007	I Don't Love You Today	Mehdi Mirmohammadi	Ali Hashemi	Molavi Hall	
2007	A Doll's House	Henrik Ibsen	Sanaz Bayan	City Theater of Tehran	
2008–2011	Blackout Dreams	Sanaz Bayan, Amir Kianpour	Kazem Sayahi, Sanaz Bayan	Molavi Hall	
2009	Twelve	Reginald Rose	Manizheh Mohamedi	City Theater of Tehran	
2009–2010	Simple Fragments	Mehdi Mirmohammadi	Ali Hashemi	Women Theater Festival, Theater Department - Drama House	
2012	The Millions of Naples	Eduardo De Filippo	Babak Mohammadi	Iranshahr Theater	
2013	Tin Tin: The Secret of Moundas Castle	Mohammad Charmshir	Arvand Dashtaray	Iranshahr Theater	
2013	The Cherry Orchard	Anton Chekhov	Hassan Majouni	Iranshahr Theater	
2013	Choiceless Awareness	Amir Konjani	Amir Konjani	Mellat Cineplex	
2014	Ham Tanab	Mahin Sadri	Mahin Sadri	Eco Diplomatic Conference Hall	
2014	Pink Footprints	Ehsan Goudarzi	Arvand Dashtaray	Iranshahr Theater	
2014, 2016	The Woman Was Taking Pictures of Memory	Farnaz Tabrizi	Amir Hossein Asani	Niavaran Cultural Center, Organon Theater	
2015	A Mouse in a Tin Pit	Noushin Tabrizi	Ali Hashemi	City Theater of Tehran	
2016	They Stare At Us	Naghmeh Samini	Mohammad Reza Asli	Masoudieh Theater, Iranshahr Theater	
2016	Israfil's Sur	Siavash Pakrah	Amer Mosafer Astaneh	Iranshahr Theater	
2016	Harvey	Mary Chase	Melody Aramnia	Iranshahr Theater	
2017	On Which Wind Will You Ride?	Jamal Hashemi	Kamal Hashemi	Tehran Independent Theater	
2017	Aquarium	Siamak Ahsaee, Mehrak Ghazvini	Siamak Ahsaee	City Theater of Tehran	
2017–2018	If You Die	Florian Zeller	Samaneh Zandinezhad	Tehran Independent Theater, Iranshahr Theater	
2018	Trauma	Afsaneh Mahian	Afsaneh Mahian	Iranshahr Theater	
2019	The Improvisation	(Improvisation)	Arvand Dashtaray	Iranshahr Theater, Malek Theater	
2019	Mary Poppins	Pamela Lyndon Travers	Ahmad Soleimani	Vahdat Hall	
2023	Tehran	Diana Fathi	Diana Fathi		
2023	Colonel	Mohammad Naghaee	Amir Bashiri	Vahdat Hall	
2024	Misery	Stephen Belber	Pouya Saeedi	Iranshahr Theater	
2024	Bluebeard	Arvand Dashtaray	Arvand Dashtaray	Book Garden Theater	
2024–2025	Lulu Island	Arash Naeemian, Khosrow Pesyani	Setareh Pesyani	Iranshahr Theater	
2025	Coraline	Neil Gaiman	Omid Reza Sepehri	Vahdat Hall	
2025	Oliver Twist	Charles Dickens	Hossein Parsaee	Enghelab Sports Complex – Tennis Stadium	
2025–2026	Belgian Fish	Léonore Confino	Arvand Dashtaray	The Core Theater & Music Hall	

== Awards and nominations ==
Name of the award ceremony, year presented, category, nominee of the award, and the result of the nomination
Award	Year	Category	Nominated Work	Result	Lost to	Ref.
Hafez Awards	2018	Best Actor – Television Series Comedy	Bachelors	Nominated	Bahram Afshari (Capital)	
Hafez Awards	2026	Best Actor – Theatre	Lulu Island	Nominated		
Women Theatre Festival	2009	Best Actor	Simple Fragments	3rd Place	–	
