= The Frog (Iranian TV series) =

- Persian: قورباغه
- Genre: Mystery; Drama; Crime; Thriller
- Created by: Houman Seyyedi
- Based on: La Haine (only first episode)
- Written by: Houman Seyyedi
- Directed by: Houman Seyyedi
- Starring: Saber Abar; Navid Mohammadzadeh; Fereshteh Hosseini; Sahar Dolatshahi
- Narrated by: Saber Abar
- Music by: Bamdad Afshar
- Composer: Bamdad Afshar
- Country of origin: Iran
- Original language: Persian
- No. of seasons: 1
- No. of episodes: 15

Production
- Producer: Ali Asadzadeh
- Production locations: Iran; Thailand
- Cinematography: Peyman Shadman far
- Editor: Houman Seyyedi
- Running time: 50 minutes

Original release
- Network: Namava
- Release: December 23, 2020 – March 29, 2021

The Frog (Persian: قورباغه, romanized: Ghoorbāgheh) is an Iranian crime and mystery TV series incorporating magical realism, written, edited and directed by Houman Seyyedi and produced by Ali Asadzadeh, produced in 2020–2021. It is Houman Seyyedi's first episodic project, the first episode of which was supposed to be released on December 15, 2020, but was delayed by a court order. Eventually, the first episode aired on December 23, 2020.

== Plot ==
In The world is a small place for me, I feel closed everywhere and I can not breathe. It's as if I've seen all these moments before, the trees, the sound of the waterfall, the frogs, I see them when I'm dying.

On Chaharshanbe Suri, three friends named Ramin (Saber Abr), Farid (Ashkan Hassanpour), and Javad (Shahrooz Del Afkar) after stealing the weapon of a wounded officer, rob Noori (Navid Mohammadzadeh), Ramin's childhood classmate, who has become a rich and mysterious man...

== Cast ==
Actor	Character	Details
Saber Abar	Ramin Fayazi	Javad and Farid's friend
Navid Mohammadzadeh	Noori Zarnegar	Ramin's childhood classmate, gang leader
Sahar Dolatshahi	Faranak Bahrami	Ramin University colleague, material producer, laboratory employee, Ramin's past mistress
Fereshteh Hosseini	Leila	Noori's sister, Soroush's love interest
Houman Seyyedi	Amirali Shamsabadi	
Mohammad Amin Sherbaf	Soroush Gholipour	Abad and Nouri's friend, In love with Leila
Nima Mazaheri	Abad	Soroush's friend
Mehran Ghafourian	Kian	
Anahita Afshar	Negar	Amirali's wife
Shahrooz Delafkar	Javad Azizi	Ramin and Farid's friend
Ashkan Hassanpour	Farid	Ramin and Javad's friend
Maneli Rasouli	Young Leila	
Esmaeel Soltanian	Nasser Fayazi	Ramin's father
Ehsan Amani		
Yadollah Shademani	Abolfazl Zarnegar	Noori's father
Omid Mohammadzadeh	Young Nasser	Ramin's father in young
Samaneh Moniri	Young Shahin	Ramin's mother in young
Peyman Mirzaei	Hassan	Aunt Ramin's husband
Ali, Pianist	Piano player in the movie	
Youna Tadin	Young Ramin	
Moein Shahcheraghi	Saeed	Ramin's sister husband
Peyman Pazoki		
Hadi Taslimi	Farhad	Javad's addicted brother
Amirparviz Tabrizchi	Foaad	Leila’s ex
Fatemeh Mortazi		
Vehid Abdullahi		
Nafas Mohammadi	Nafas, Zari	Foaad’s sister
Alireza vatan parast	Ali v	Piano player in the movie
Sepehr Sepi	Ali	Piano player in the movie

== Production ==
The Frog is the first series directed by Houman Seyyedi and is also Navid Mohammadzadeh's first series. Filming started in 2019 and was stopped due to the outbreak of the Coronavirus, filming finished in the summer of 2020 and 15 episodes were produced. The filming of the Frog took about two years.

== Distribution ==
Negotiations were held for the release of the series on Netflix, but no agreement was reached, and the series was finally released on Namava (an Iranian streaming service). The first episode of the series is an open interpretation of La Haine. 48 hours after the release of the first episode, the series set a record with 40 million views in Iranian home video.

== Episodes ==
Episode number	Episode title	Episode time	Date of Release
1	Africa	48 minutes	23 December 2020
2	Kill the dogs	52 minutes	28 December 2020
3	The despicable sticking to the column	49 minutes	4 January 2021
4	The smell of rotten bitter orange	45 minutes	11 January 2021
5	Red balloon	45 minutes	18 January 2021
6	Find your seat	50 minutes	25 January 2021
7	I found my seat	53 minutes	1 February 2021
8	As a reminder, you have a meeting today	47 minutes	8 February 2021
9	The cut finger	45 minutes	15 February 2021
10	Devil's breath	48 minutes	22 February 2021
11	Burn him in fire	43 minutes	1 March 2021
12	Private	54 minutes	8 March 2021
13	Conspiracy theory	53 minutes	15 March 2021
14	Red tears	44 minutes	22 March 2021
15 (The Final Episode)	The Frog	72 minutes	29 March 2021

== Reception ==
=== Critical response ===
Massoud Farasati criticized the series in Haft program and said:

In my opinion, The Frog is not so bad. I think we can talk about this series and especially about directing. I think Seyyedi is ahead of his previous film, but its script is weak.

Brian O’Shea, CEO of The Exchange:

Houman is an undeniable talent and rising star. His award-winning features honed his incredible eye and ability to pace a suspenseful story and build a complex world filled that entertains audiences that love all genres. We are incredibly happy to bring this amazing series to the rest of the world. Much like Fauda, Elite, and others, this foreign language series is primed to take the world by storm.

=== Awards and nominations ===
Year	Award	Category	Recipient	Result	Ref.
2021	21st Hafez Awards	Best Television Series	The Frog	resigned	
2021	21st Hafez Awards	Best Director – Television Series	Houman Seyyedi	resigned	
2021	21st Hafez Awards	Best Screenplay – Television Series	Houman Seyyedi	resigned	
2021	21st Hafez Awards	Best Actor – Television Series Drama	Saber Abar	resigned	
2021	21st Hafez Awards	Best Actor – Television Series Drama	Navid Mohammadzadeh	resigned	
2021	21st Hafez Awards	Best Actress – Television Series Drama	Fereshteh Hosseini	resigned	
2021	21st Hafez Awards	Best Actress – Television Series Drama	Sahar Dolatshahi	resigned	
2022	1st Iranian Cinema Directors' Great Celebration	Best Home Video Director	Houman Seyyedi	Nominated	
