= The Accomplice (TV series) =

Iranian drama series

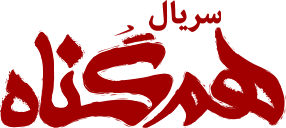
- Genre: Drama; Romance
- Written by: Mohsen Kiaee; Ali Kouchaki
- Directed by: Mostafa Kiaee
- Starring: Parviz Parastui; Hedieh Tehrani; Mohsen Kiaee; Habib Rezaee; Masoud Rayegan; Roya Teymourian; Pedram Sharifi; Mehdi Pakdel; Hengameh Ghaziani; Afsaneh Naseri
- Theme music composer: Arman Mousapour
- Ending theme: Alireza Ghorbani
- Country of origin: Iran
- Original language: Persian
- No. of seasons: 2
- No. of episodes: 24

Production
- Producer: Mostafa Kiaee
- Production location: Tehran
- Cinematography: Hossein Jalili
- Editor: Nima Jafari
- Running time: 50 minutes

Original release
- Network: Filimo, Namava
- Release: February 25 – May 18, 2020

The Accomplice (Persian: هم‌گناه, romanized: Ham-gonah) is a 2020 Iranian television series created by Mostafa Kiaee.

== Plot ==
The series follows the story of an old family in Tehran called the Sabouris who have been cultivating decorative flowers and various flowers for many years. The Saburi family consists of three brothers and a sister, all of whom work for the company in their family's inherited occupation. The only son is Fariborz, who is now 58 years old and is an intelligence officer and life story. He wrote himself unaffected by his family. At a young age, Fariborz decides to become a policeman and goes to a city to undergo a training course.

The Sabouri family still lives together in peace in old houses, but the arrival of a young man in this family changes the life of the whole family, which ...

== Cast ==
- Parviz Parastui
- Hedieh Tehrani
- Mohsen kiae
- Habib Rezaei
- Masoud Rayegan
- Roya Teymourian
- Pedram Sharifi
- Mehdi Pakdel
- Hengameh Ghaziani
- Afsaneh Naseri
- Sogol Khaligh
- Maral Baniadam

== Soundtracks ==
No.	Title	singer	Length
1.	"The Accomplice" (Hamgonah)	Alireza Ghorbani	3:59
2.	"Start Abruptly" (Shorro-e-Nagahan)	Alireza Ghorbani	4:00
3.	"Happy Dream" (Khial-e-Khosh)	Alireza Ghorbani	3:49

== Reception ==
=== Awards and nominations ===
Year	Award	Category	Recipient	Result	Ref.
2021	Hafez Awards	Best Television Series	The Accomplice	Nominated	
2021	Hafez Awards	Best Director – Television Series	Mostafa Kiae	Nominated	
2021	Hafez Awards	Best Screenplay – Television Series	Mohsen Kiae, Ali Kouchaki	Nominated	
2021	Hafez Awards	Best Actress – Television Series Drama	Hedieh Tehrani	Nominated	
2021	Hafez Awards	Best Actress – Television Series Drama	Sogol Khaligh	Nominated	
2021	Hafez Awards	Best Actress – Television Series Drama	Saghi Hajipour	Nominated	
2021	Hafez Awards	Best Original Song	''The Accomplice'' (Alireza Ghorbani, Hossein Ghyasi, Alireza Afkari)	Won	
