= Sheida Khaligh =

Iranian actress (born 1993)

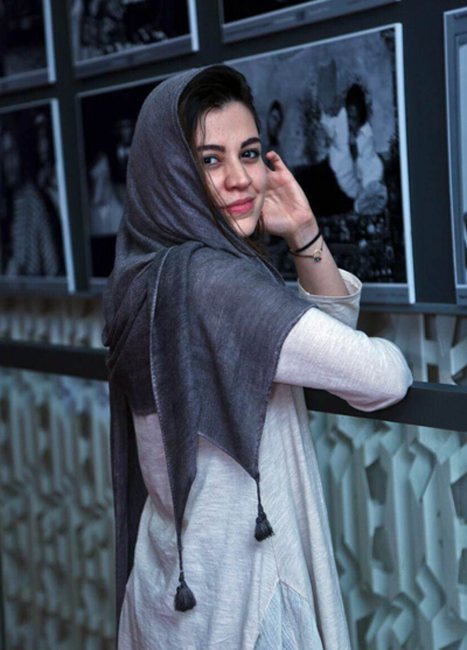
- Khaligh at the 2018 Fajr International Film Festival
- Born: May 26, 1993 (age 32); Tehran, Iran
- Occupation: Actress
- Years active: 2009–present
- Spouse: Keyvan Saketof (m. 2024)
- Parent: Nahid Moslemi (mother)

Sheida Khaligh (Persian: شیدا خلیق; born May 26, 1993) is an Iranian actress. She is best known for her roles in Girls (2009), Golshifteh (2018), and The Last Birthday (2023).

== Early life ==
Sheida Khaligh was born on May 26, 1993, in Tehran, Iran.

== Personal life ==
She married Keyvan Saketof on May 14, 2024, after 14 years of relationship.

== Filmography ==
=== Film ===
Year	Title	Role	Director	Notes	Ref(s)
2009	Girls	Maneli	Ghasem Jafari		
2011	A Cube of Sugar	Marzieh	Reza Mirkarimi		
2012	Kissing the Moon-Like Face	Negar	Homayoun As'adian		
2014	Italy Italy	Mina	Ali Farshchi	Short film	
2015	Exterior Wash	Mahtab	Jaber Ramezani	Short film	
2016	In Silence	Setareh	George Hashemzadeh		
2017	Chemical		Ashkan Masti	Short film	
2018	Forty Seven	Sara	Alireza Ataallahetabrizi, Ahmad Otraghchi		
2019	Seven and a Half	Niloufar	Navid Mahmoudi		
2020	Sugar Crush		Ayda Tebyanian	Short film	
2021	Half Distance	Azadeh	Elham Rad	Short film	
2021	Hormas	Sheida / Veronica	Mehdi Sahebi		
2022	Sparrow	Elnaz	Soheil Karimi Kandi		
2023	The Last Birthday	Leily	Navid Mahmoudi		

=== Web ===
Year	Title	Role	Director	Platform	Notes	Ref(s)
2018	Golshifteh	Hengameh	Behrouz Shoeibi	Filimo	Main role	
2023	The Translator	Mozhgan	Bahram Tavakoli	Namava	Supporting role	
2023–2024	Mafia Nights: Zodiac	Herself	Mohammad Reza Rezaeean	Filimo	Game show	
2024	Ahangi Night	Herself	Hamed Ahangi	Filmnet	Talk show	
2024	Dariush	Kazem's wife	Hadi Hejazifar	Filmnet	Supporting role	

=== Television ===
Year	Title	Role	Director	Network	Notes	Ref(s)
2013	Two Stories for One Marriage		Shahram Shah Hosseini	IRIB TV2	TV film	
2013	A Few More Days	Shirin	Parisa Gorgin	IRIB TV3	TV film	
2014–2015	Everything Is There	Soraya Farahmand	Shahram Shah Hosseini	IRIB TV3	TV series	
2016	Saffron	Maryam Za'afarani	Hamed Mohammadi	IRIB TV2	TV series	
2016	Ferris Wheel		Azizollah Hamidnezhad	IRIB TV1	TV series	
2017	The Convists		Seyyed Jamal Seyyed Hatami, Hossein Ghena'at	IRIB TV1	TV series	
2018	Board of Directors	Mandana	Maziar Miri	IRIB TV5	TV series	
2019	Even or Odd	Ameneh Shahri	Alireza Najafzadeh	IRIB TV3	TV series	
2021	The Neighbor	Elham	Mohammad Hossein Ghazanfari	IRIB TV3	TV series	

== Theatre ==
Year	Title	Playwright	Director	Stage	Ref(s)
2014	The Past Continues	Marzieh Ozgoli	Neda Hengami	City Theater of Tehran	
2015	Autumn	Nader Borhani Marand	Nader Borhani Marand	Eco Diplomatic Conference Hall	
2016–2017	They Stare At Us	Naghmeh Samini	Mohammad Reza Asli	Masoudieh Theater, Iranshahr Theater	
2017	Sama'izadeh	Reza Baharvand	Reza Baharvand	Hamoon Theatre	
2017	Koukou of Shrine Pigeons	Alireza Naderi	Afsaneh Mahian	Shahrzad Theater Complex	
2017–2018	Requiem for a Dracula	Ali Razazian, Mohadeseh Ghobadi	Ali Razazian	Shahrzad Theater Complex	
2023	Tehran	Diana Fathi	Diana Fathi		
2023	The Father	Florian Zeller	Arvand Dashtaray	City Theater of Tehran	
2025	The Midnight Library	Mojtaba Golestani, Nima Nafe'	Mohammad Malek Shahi	Malek Theater	

== Awards and nominations ==
Name of the award ceremony, year presented, category, nominee of the award, and the result of the nomination
Award	Year	Category	Nominated Work	Result	Ref(s)
Nahal International Short Film Festival	2015	Best Actress	Exterior Wash	Honorary Diploma	
