= Mastan Ensemble =

Iranian music group

Mastān Ensemble
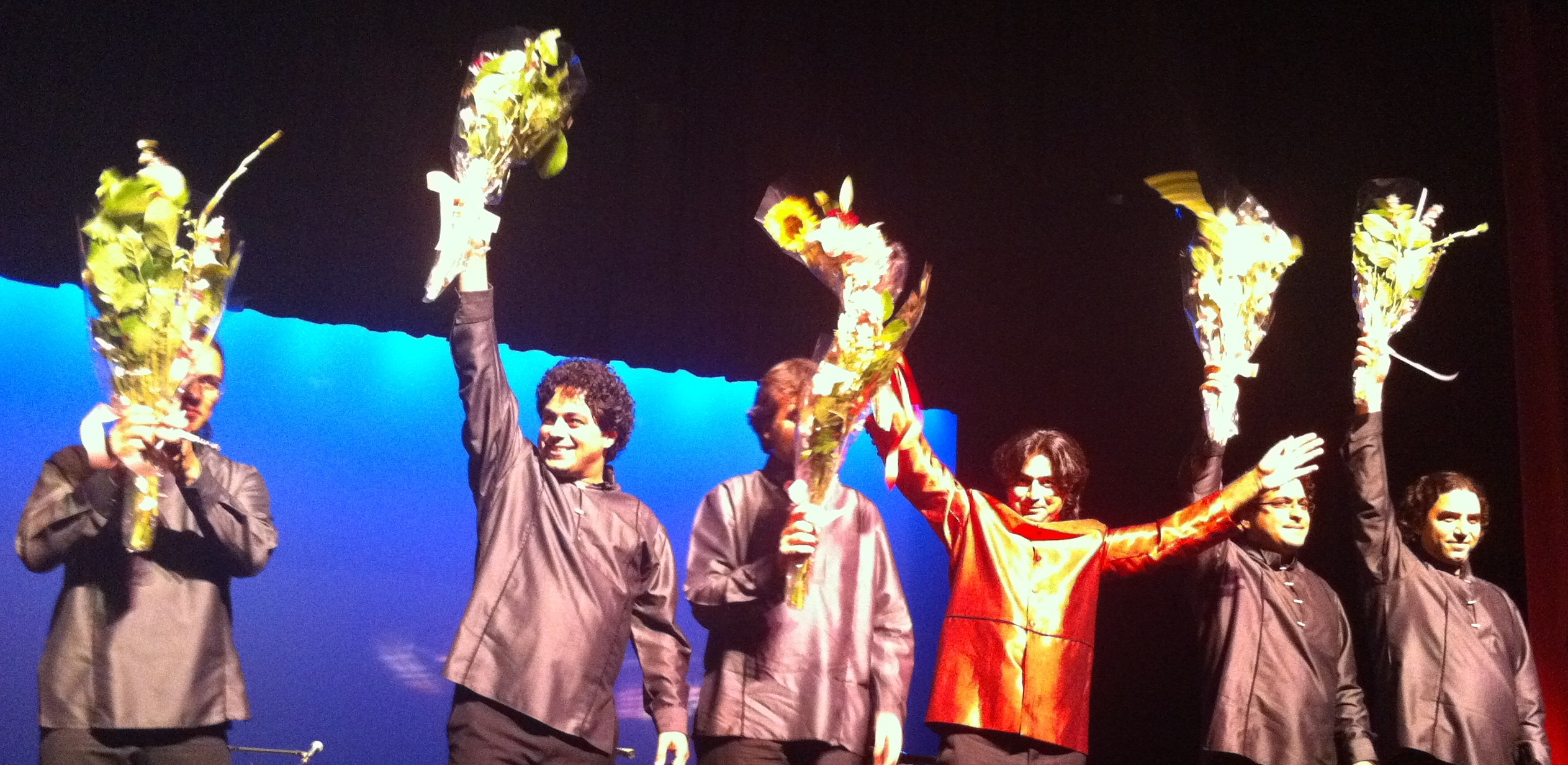
- Homay & Mastan 2010 US/Canada Tour, Houston, TX

Background information
- Origin: Iran
- Genre: Persian music
- Members: Parvaz Homay (vocals)

The Mastān Ensemble (Persian: گروه مستان - Gorouh-e Mastān) is an Iranian musical group performing traditional Persian music.

== History ==
The group was founded as Hafez Ensemble in 2005 by Sa'id Jafarzādeh Homāy (سعيد جعفرزاده هماي), also known as Parvāz Homāy (پرواز همای) and Homāy Foomani. The group's performance follows a Persian tradition of music making known as Chāmeh Sarā'i (چامه سرایی) according to which one person is in charge of writing the poems, composing the musics, arranging the instruments as well as singing the songs. The instruments employed by this Ensemble include Daf, Dayereh, Kamāncheh, Lute, Reed, Robab, Santour, Tār and Tonbak. The Mastān Ensemble derive their inspirations from such Sufi poets as Farid ad-Din Attar, Hafez and Rumi. The performances of this Ensemble are emotionally intense and the thoughts and meanings conveyed by their musics and songs are both philosophical and contemplative. Mastan played their debut U.S. performance at Walt Disney Concert Hall in 2008. beside United States they also toured in Europe and Canada.
Mastan are not allowed to release their works in Iran.

=== Members of the Ensemble ===
- Parvaz Homay Homāy (پرواز همای), better known as Parvāz Homāy, Singer, composer of music and song, and conductor
- Esfandyār Shāh'mir, Daf
- Mahmoud Nozari, Santour
- Alireza Mehdizadeh, Kamancheh & Gheychak
- Sahab Torbati, Tonbak
- Nima Delnavazi, Tar
- Saeid Fahimi, Ney

Former musicians:

- Arjang Faramarzi, Tonbak
- Pasha Hanjani, Ney
- Sina Jahanabadi, Kamancheh
- Azad Mirzapour, Tar
- Ali Pajuheshgar, Barbat
