= Ardeshir Kazemi =

Iranian actor (born 1938)

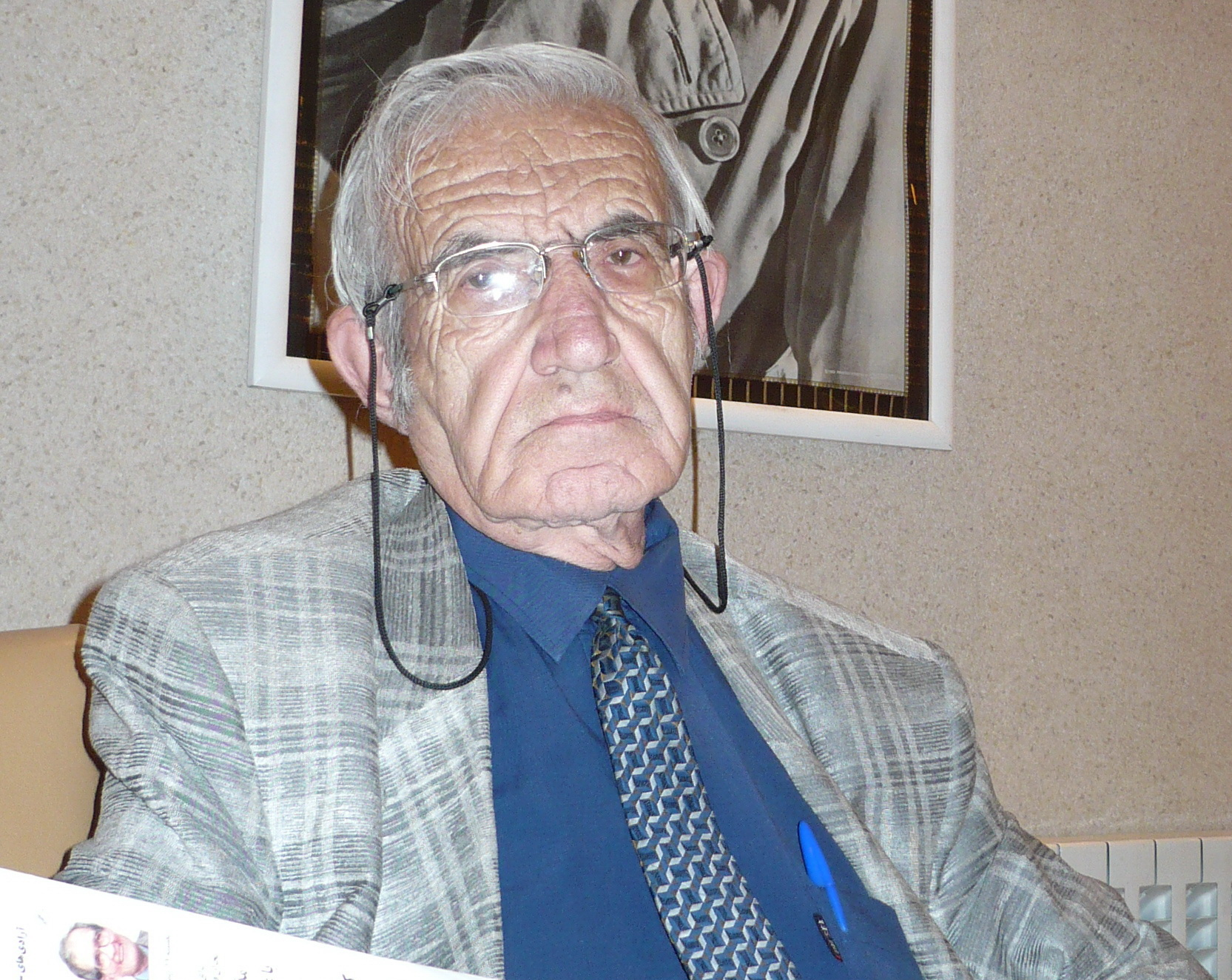
- Born: 20 November 1938 (age 88); Bandar-e Anzali, Iran
- Occupation: Actor
- Years active: 2001–present

Ardeshir Kazemi (Persian: اردشیر کاظمی, born 20 November 1938) is an Iranian actor.

Kazemi's date of birth has frequently been given as 9 September 1920. In a 2023 interview, Kazemi clarified that this was incorrect, and that he was in fact born on 20 November 1938.

He also dismissed the myth that he was the oldest actor in Iranian cinema or television.

== Filmography ==
- You Only Go Around Once, 2023
