= Rahe Bipayan =

- Also known as: Endless Path
- راه بی‌پایان/
- Created by: Homayoun Assadian
- Starring: Atila Pesyani; Farhad Aslani; Mehrdad Ziaee; Houman Seyyedi; Azadeh Samadi; Bita Saharkhiz; Mahboubeh Bayat; Mehran Rajabi
- Country of origin: Iran
- No. of episodes: 26

Production
- Running time: 40-45 minutes

Original release
- Network: Channel 3
- Release: 24 April – 31 October 2007

Rahe Bipayan (Persian: راه بی‌پایان, literally Endless Path), is a 2007 television series broadcast by the IRIB network. The Director, producer and script-writer are Homayoun Assadian, Mostafa Azizi, and Ali Reza Bazrafshan. The show is very popular with television viewers in Iran and a notable point of Rahe Bipayan is the performance of Farhad Aslani as Akbar Abolhassani.

== Cast ==
- Atila Pesyani as Behzad Toutounchi
- Farhad Aslani as Akbar Abolhassani
- Mehrdad Ziaee as Kamran Saremi
- Houman Seyyedi as Mansour Pourvatan
- Azadeh Samadi as Ghazal Toutounchi
- Bita Saharkhiz as Mina
- Mahboubeh Bayat as Monir
- Mehran Rajabi as Mikaeel
- Babak Behshad as Vahid
- Saeed Pirdoust as Abolhassani's friend
- Hamid Mahindoust as Saeed Tamaddon
- Ala Mohseni as Behdouj
