= Parting (film) =

2016 Afghan-Iranian drama film

- Film poster
- Directed by: Navid Mahmoudi
- Written by: Navid Mahmoudi
- Starring: Reza Ahmadi; Fereshteh Hosseini; Behrang Alavi; Nazanin Bayati
- Cinematography: Koohyar Kalari
- Edited by: Jamshid Mahmoudi
- Music by: Sahand Mahdizadeh
- Production company: Aseman Parvaz Film
- Distributed by: DreamLab Films
- Release dates: 9 September 2016 (Afghanistan); 9 October 2016 (BIFF)
- Running time: 78 minutes
- Countries: Afghanistan; Iran
- Languages: Persian; Eastern Persian

Parting is a 2016 Afghan-Iranian drama film written and directed by Navid Mahmoudi. It was selected as the Afghan entry for the Best Foreign Language Film at the 89th Academy Awards. However, the film was not included in the final list of submissions published by the Academy. It was screened at the Busan International Film Festival in October 2016. Parting was the inaugural film at the 21st International Film Festival of Kerala.

== Cast ==
- Reza Ahmadi as Nabi
- Fereshteh Hosseini as Pari
- Behrang Alavi
- Nazanin Bayati
- Shams Langroudi

== Awards and nominations ==
Award	Category	Recipient	Result
21st Busan International Film Festival	Vision-Director's Award	Navid Mahmoudi	Won

== See also ==
- List of submissions to the 89th Academy Awards for Best Foreign Language Film
- List of Afghan submissions for the Academy Award for Best Foreign Language Film
