= Parvaz Homay =

Iranian composer (born 1980)

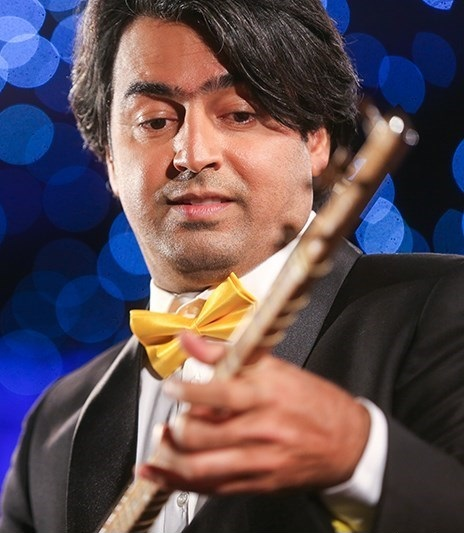
- Homay during his concert in Niavaran Palace

Background information
- Birth name: Saeid Jafarzadeh Ahmadsargurabi
- Born: 9 February 1980 (age 45); Ahmadsargurab, Iran
- Genres: Persian traditional music
- Occupation(s): Composer, singer

Parvaz Homay (Persian: پرواز همای; born 9 February 1980) is an Iranian composer, lyricist, vocalist, and performer specializing in Persian classical-style music. Also known by his birth name Saeid Jafarzadeh Ahmadsargurabi (سعید جعفرزاده احمدسرگورابی), he is the founder and leader of the Mastan Ensemble.

== Biography ==
Homay was born in Gilan, a province located in the northwest portion of Iran, bordering the Caspian Sea. From an early age, Homay showed an interest in the arts. At the age of 15, he began singing and acting in theater. At 16, he entered art school, receiving his diploma in painting.

At 19, he left theater school and decided to study musical harmonization and composition, focusing on piano and setar. He received his formal education in art studies and pursued his degree from The Conservatory of Music in Tehran, Iran.

=== Albums by Homay and the Mastan Ensamble ===
1. Jedale Aghl va Eshgh (2005) (The Battle between Wisdom and Heart)
2. Molahgat ba Doozakhian (2006) (Meeting with the Infernals)
3. In Che Jahanist? (2007) (What Sort of World Is This?)
4. Sar Zamine Bi Karan (2008) (Endless Country)
5. Parvardgare Mast (2009) (Drunken Creator)
6. Ajab Abe Gelaloodi (2010) - unreleased (A Hidden Truth Within Muddy Waters)
7. Mussa va Shaban: Moses and the Shepherd (2010) - unreleased
8. Mastan Symphonic (2010) - unreleased
9. Morgh-e Sahar Naleh Sar Nakon (Don't Cry Morning Bird)
10. Sarbazaan (Soldiers)
11. Dar Aghoush-e Khoda (In the Bosom of God)
12. Mast-e Mastam (I'm Dead Drunk)
13. Banu-ye Irani (Iranian Lady)
14. Kolahat ra Bekon Ghazi (Be Your Own Judge)
15. Bayadha Va Nabayadha (The Do's and Don't's)
16. Divaneh Cho Divaneh Bebinad Khoshash Ayad
17. Khodah Dar Roosta-ye Mast (God is in my Village)
