= Houman Seyyedi =

Iranian actor and filmmaker (1980)

- هومن سيدی
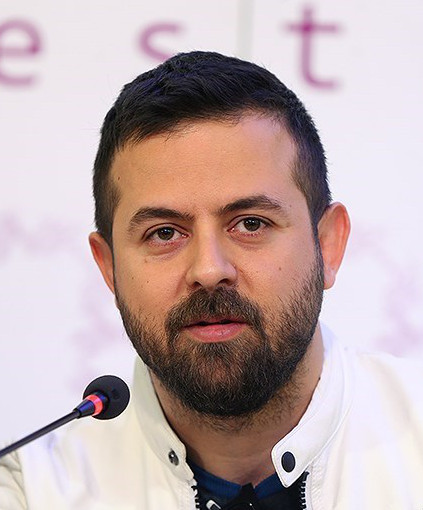
- Seyyedi in 2016
- Born: November 29, 1980 (age 45); Rasht, Iran
- Occupations: Actor; director; screenwriter; editor
- Years active: 2004—present
- Spouses: Azadeh Samadi (m. 2007; div. 2014) Bita Aslani (m. 2017)
- Children: One

Houman Seyyedi (Persian: هومن سيدی, born November 29, 1980) is an Iranian actor, director, screenwriter, and editor. He has received various accolades, including six Crystal Simorghs–making him the only director to have three wins in Special Jury Prize category–two Hafez Awards, five Iran's Film Critics and Writers Association Awards, a NETPAC Award and an Asian New Talent Award. His sixth film, World War III (2022) won the Orizzonti Award for Best Film at the 79th Venice International Film Festival.

Seyyedi introduced many actors to cinema through his films, most of whom had been trained at his 8mm Film School. Among these actors are Amir Jadidi, Navid Pourfaraj, Azadeh Samadi, Marjan Ettefaghian, Mahsa Hejazi, Amin Sherbaf, Yasna Mirtahmasb, Ladan Zhavehvand, Navid Nosrati, Nima Mazaheri, Ashkan Hassanpour, Ehsan Mansouri, and Hadi Taslimi.

== Early life ==
Houman Seyyedi was born on November 29, 1980, in Rasht, Iran. He is the second child in his family, with a sister named Hilda and two brothers, Hamoon and Hamed. His father is a retired employee of the Agricultural Bank, and his mother was formerly employed by the Iranian Navy. Seyyedi has a niece named Mobina. In 2006, he married Azadeh Samadi, but the couple divorced in 2013. He later remarried and has a daughter named Nil.

After completing high school and earning a diploma in graphic design, Seyyedi began his career by attending classes at the Rasht Branch of the Iranian Youth Cinema Society, where he produced several short films. He subsequently moved to Tehran and enrolled in acting classes at the Karnameh Institute, managed by Parviz Parastui.

== Career ==
=== Acting ===
In the mid-2000s, Houman Seyyedi appeared alongside Reza Kianian in the film One Piece of Bread and later played a minor role in Asghar Farhadi's Fireworks Wednesday. He gained prominence for his starring role in Bahram Tavakoli's debut feature film, Barefoot in Heaven, which brought recognition to both Tavakoli and Seyyedi. His performance earned him a nomination for Best Actor at the Iran Cinema Celebration Awards.

Seyyedi also performed in theater, taking roles in Hossein Kiani's plays The Neighbor of the Gentleman and Constitutional Lady. His television credits include the series Endless Path directed by Homayoun Assadian, Until Thurya by Sirus Moghadam, and telefilms such as Sayab by Mohammad Ali Sajjadi and If It Rains by Rouhollah Hejazi. His role in the series Asheghaneh garnered significant popularity, marking it as his most successful acting project to date.

Other notable films in Seyyedi's acting career include Night Out, Special Line by Mostafa Kiaei, Profiles by Iraj Karimi, In the Meantime, Sleep Bridge, Motherhood, Human Comedy, Confiscation, and Gold by Parviz Shahbazi. For his performance in I Am Diego Maradona, Seyyedi won the Best Supporting Actor award at both the Fajr Film Festival and the Iranian Film Critics and Writers Association.

=== Directing ===
After directing several short films, including 35 Meters Above Water and Blue Tooth, which earned him numerous awards at the Tehran International Short Film Festival, Seyyedi made his feature directorial debut in 2010 with Africa. The film won Best Film and Best Actress (for Azadeh Samadi) in the video section of the 29th Fajr Film Festival. Seyyedi also served as the writer and editor for the film. Critics have categorized Africa as part of Iran's film noir movement, and some consider Seyyedi a successor to Asghar Farhadi's social cinema, albeit with distinct, non-classical framing and composition. He also wrote and directed the theater production An Unfinished Narrative of a Suspended Season.

Seyyedi has introduced several new actors to Iranian cinema through his films, including Amir Jadidi, Yasna Mirtahmasb, Navid Pourfaraj, Laden Zhavehvand, and Hamon Seyyedi. His directorial works include Africa, Thirteen, Confessions of My Dangerous Mind, Rage and Roar, Small Rusty Brains, and World War III. His film Small Rusty Brains was one of the highest-grossing films in Iran during its 2018 release.

Seyyedi's first foray into series production was The Frog, a home video distribution series that received widespread acclaim and became the highest-rated Iranian series on IMDb.

=== Teaching ===
In addition to his work in film and theater, Seyyedi teaches acting at his own academy, mentoring aspiring actors.

== Personal life ==
=== Political views ===
After winning the Special Jury Prize at the 2013 Fajr Film Festival for his film Thirteen, Seyyedi dedicated his award to then-Iranian President Hassan Rouhani, describing him as someone who "brought smiles to people's faces." Years later, during the 2022 Iranian protests, Seyyedi expressed regret for this action on Instagram, writing:

This stain will never be erased from me. I despise myself for naively taking a step toward a better tomorrow. I am ashamed of myself and will never forgive myself.

On 4 February 2026, Seyyedi criticized celebrities attending the Fajr Film Festival in light of the 2025–2026 Iranian protests on his Instagram, saying: “Cinema has meaning when it stands next to humans; when it passes over them, it is just a worthless image.”

== Awards and recognition ==
Houman Seyyedi received an honorary doctorate from Iran's Supreme Council of the Cultural Revolution for his domestic and international achievements. His works have earned numerous accolades from festivals such as Fajr, Warsaw (Poland), Busan (South Korea), Shanghai (China), the Iranian Film Critics and Writers Association, and the International City Film Festival. These include awards for Best Screenplay, Best Director, Best Film, Special Jury Prize, and Audience Choice for Best Film.

In 2020, Seyyedi directed his first home video series, The Frog. His film World War III won the Best Film award in the Horizons section of the 79th Venice Film Festival.

== Filmography ==
=== Film ===
Year	Title	Role	Director	Notes	Ref(s)
2005	A Piece of Bread	Gheys	Kamal Tabrizi		
2006	Fireworks Wednesday	Abdolreza	Asghar Farhadi		
2006	Barefoot in Paradise	Yehya	Bahram Tavakoli		
2006	He Who Goes to the Sea	Soldier	Arash Moayerian		
2007	Eve’s Shoulder Wound		Hossein Ghena'at		
2011	Africa		Houman Seyyedi	also as screenwriter and editor	
2012	The Freeway	Morteza	Abbas Rafiee		
2014	Thirteen		Houman Seyyedi	also as screenwriter and editor	
2014	Night, Outdoor		Kaveh Sajjadi Hosseini		
2014	The Exclusive Line		Mostafa Kiaee		
2015	Buffalo		Kaveh Sajjadi Hosseini		
2015	I Am Diego Maradona	Babak	Bahram Tavakoli		
2015	Confessions of My Dangerous Mind	iPod man	Houman Seyyedi	as screenwriter and editor	
2015	In the Specified Time	Saeed	Vahid Amirkhani		
2016	Profiles		Iraj Karimi		
2016	Nobody One Does Not Die	Ashkan	Hossein Kondori		
2016	Bridge of Sleep	Mohsen	Oktay Baraheni		
2016	Sound and Fury		Houman Seyyedi	also as screenwriter and editor	
2017	Azar	Saber	Mohammad Hamzei		
2017	Human Comedy		Mohammad Hadi Karimi		
2017	Mothering	Saeed	Roghayeh Tavakoli		
2018	Confiscation	Zakaria	Mehran Ahmadi		
2018	Sheeple		Houman Seyyedi	also as screenwriter and editor	
2019	Gold	Mansour	Parviz Shahbazi		
2022	Without Her		Arian Vazirdaftari	as producer	
2022	World War III		Houman Seyyedi	also as screenwriter and editor	

=== Web ===
Year	Title	Role	Director	Notes	Platform	Ref(s)
2016	The Romance	Peyman Rastag	Manouchehr Hadi	Main role	Video CD	
2018	Golshifteh	Houman	Behrouz Shoeibi	Main role	Filimo	
2020–2021	The Frog	Amirali Shamsabadi	Houman Seyyedi	Supporting role; also as screenwriter and editor	Namava	
2021	Gisoo	Peyman Rastag	Manouchehr Hadi	Main role	Namava	
2021	Mutual Friendship	Himself	Shahab Hosseini	Talk show; 1 episode	Namava	
2022	Party	Himself	Iraj Tahmasb	Guest appearance	Namava	
2023	Vertigo	Reza Badiee	Behrang Tofighi	Main role	Namava	
2024	Viper of Tehran	Himself	Saman Moghaddam	Cameo	Filmnet	
2025	The Savage	Khosrow	Houman Seyyedi	Also as screenwriter and editor	Filmnet	

=== Television ===
Year	Title	Role	Director	Network	Ref(s)
2007	Endless Path	Mansour Pourvatan	Homayoun Assadian	IRIB TV3	
2009–2010	In the Eye of the Wind		Masoud Djafari Djozani	IRIB TV1	
2010	The 30th Day	Siavash Kiani	Javad Afshar	IRIB TV1	
2011	Up to The Sky	Hamid	Sirous Moghaddam	IRIB TV1	
2013	Mehr Abad		Farid Sajadi Hosseini	IRIB TV5	
