= Pre-revolutionary Iranian cinema =

Part of the history of Iranian cinema

Cinema of Iran 1950s–1970s

Pre-revolutionary Iranian cinema (Persian: سینمای ایران قبل از انقلاب) contains films and cinematic events made in Iran before the Iranian Revolution era. Hooshang Kavoosi, an Iranian film critic first used term Filmfarsi (Persian: فیلمفارسی) to point to Iranian popular films before revolution.

== History ==
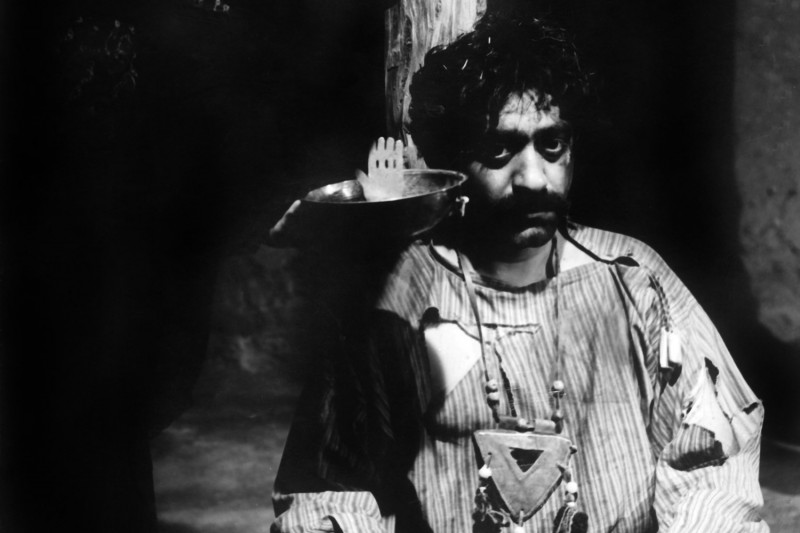
Ezzatollah Entezami in The Cow (1969)

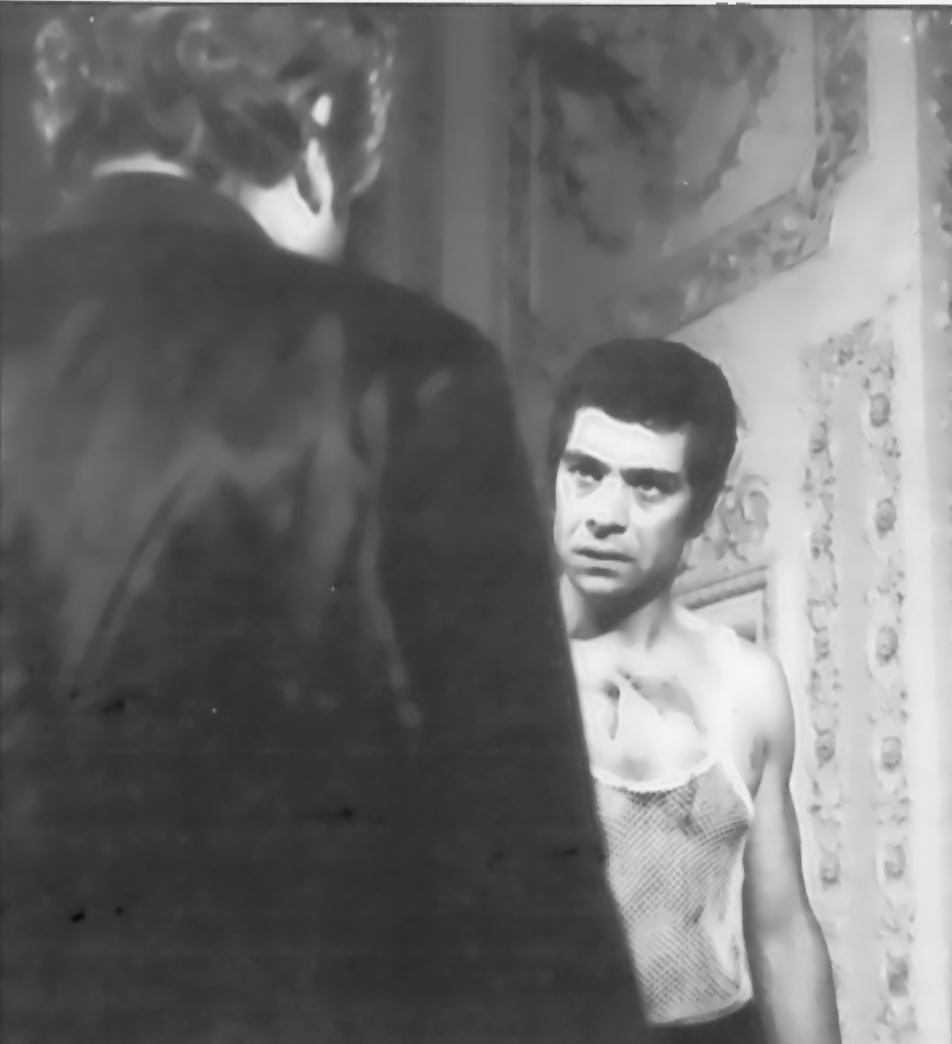
Behrouz Vossoughi & Jamshid Mashayekhi in Qeysar (1969)

The 1960s was a significant decade for Iranian cinema, with 25 commercial films produced annually on average throughout the early ‘60s, increasing to 65 by the end of the decade. The majority of production focused on melodrama and thrillers.

From 1937 till 1947 because of the world economic conditions and then the involvement in World War Two, the motion picture industry in Iran did not produce a single film, but the flow of foreign film to Iran did not stop. In 1947, Esmail Koushan, with the help of some of his colleagues, established Mitra Films (1997), the first real film company in Tehran. Through their persistence, local feature film production was born and survived.

The movie that really boost the economy of Iranian cinema and initiated a new genre was Ganj-e Qarun (Croesus Treasure), made in 1965 by Siamak Yasemi. Three years later Davoud Mollapour directed Shohare Ahoo Khanoom (Madam Ahou's Husband), which revolutionized Iranian Cinema by portraying women's role in the Iranian society at that time. It also showed actresses (Mehri Vadadian and Adile Eshragh) to be the heroes on big screen for the first time. In 1969, Masoud Kimiai made Qeysar. With Qeysar, Kimiai depicted the ethics and morals of the romanticized poor working class of the Ganj-e-Qarun genre through his main protagonist, the titular Qeysar. But Kimiay's film generated another genre in Iranian popular cinema: the tragic action drama.

With the screening of the films Shohare Ahoo Khanoom directed by Davoud Mollapour in 1968, and Qeysar and The Cow directed by Masoud Kimiai and Dariush Mehrjui respectively in 1969, alternative film established their status in the film industry. By 1970 Iranian cinema entered into its mature stage. The College of Dramatic Arts, instituted in 1963, produced its first graduates at the decade's beginning. Many progressive film co-ops and associations came into existence and there were a few regular film festivals taking place in the country. Attempts to organize a film festival that had begun in 1954 within the framework of the Golrizan Festival, bore fruits in the form of the Sepas Film Festival in 1969. The first Iranian film festival was held in 1970 with Qeysar, The Cow, and Shohare Ahoo Khanoom winning the first, second and third prize for the best pictures respectively. The endeavors of Ali Mortazavi also resulted in the formation of the Tehran International Film Festival in 1973.

From 1950 to the mid-1960 the Iranian film industry grew rapidly. Many studios were established as well as others that entered the Cycle of the film industry independently. There were 324 films produced during this period 1950 for 1965. By 1965 there were 72 movie theatres in Tehran and 192 in other Provinces. Ebrahim Golestan in 1965 directed by films of interest Brick and Mirror 1965. Bahram Beyzai is the director of one of the ground-breaking films of the Iranian New wave, 1972 Ragbar (Downpour). Sohrab Shahid-Saless is auteur director who embodied his original style in his 1975 film Still Life. Abbas Kiarostami is now a well-known director of the 1990s who directed one of the last films that screened before the revolution in 1978, Gozaresh (The Report).

== Notable directors ==
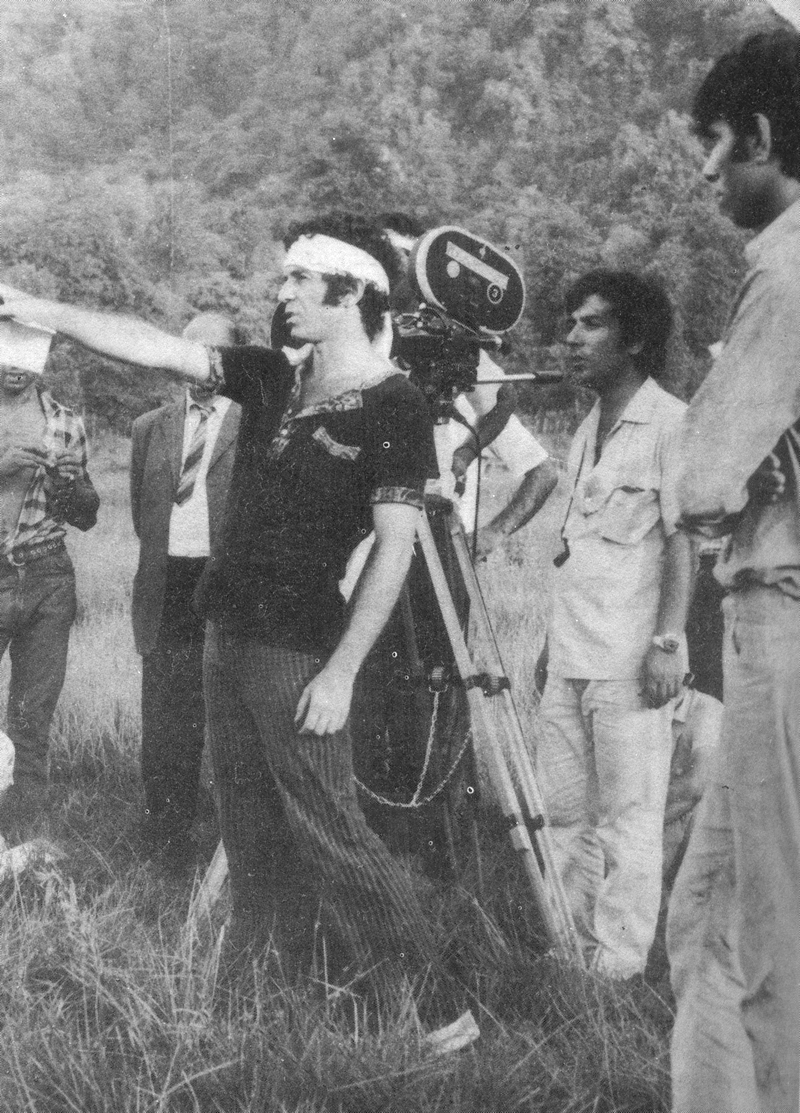
Dariush Mehrjui behind the scenes of Postchi (Postman)

- Amin Amini
- Abdolhossein Sepanta
- Esmail Koushan
- Masoud Kimiay
- Dariush Mehrjui
- Ebrahim Golestan
- Bahram Beyzai
- Sohrab Shahid-Saless
- Parviz Kimiavi
- Amir Naderi
- Forough Farrokhzad
- Nasser Taghvai
- Ali Hatami

== Notable actors ==
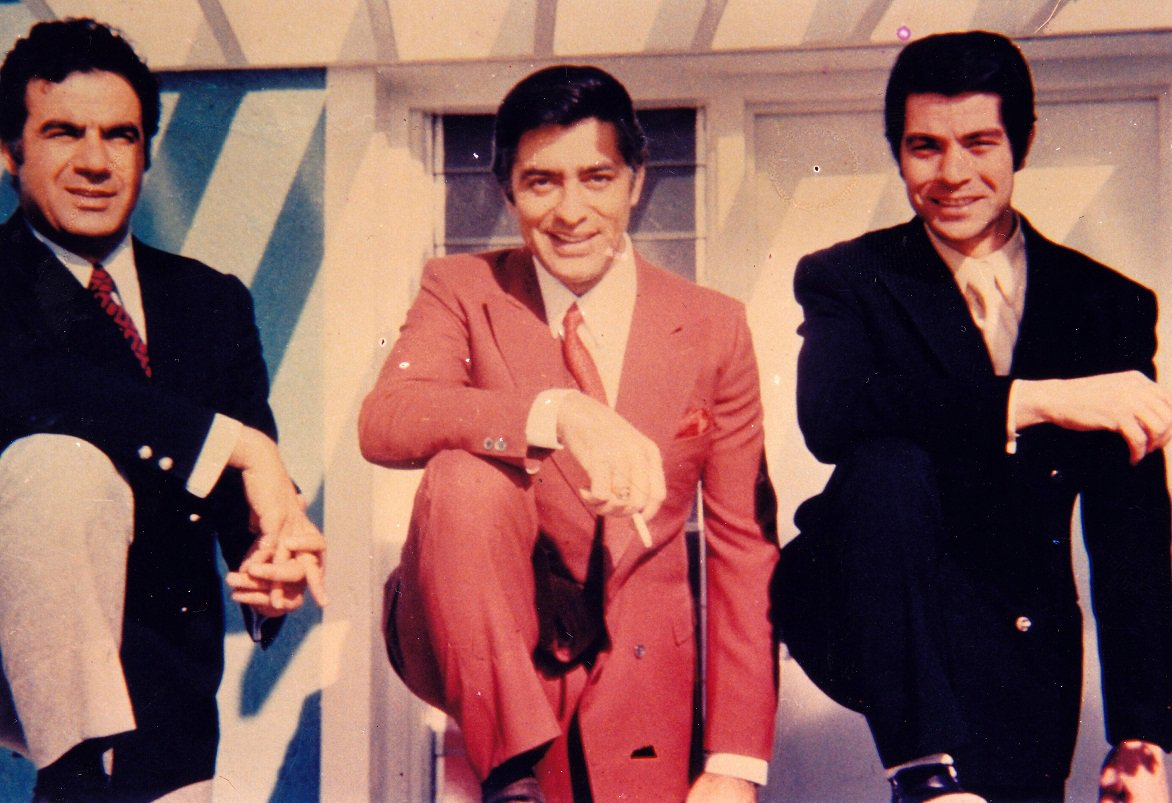
From left Naser Malek Motiei, Mohammad Ali Fardin and Behrouz Vossoughi (1960s)

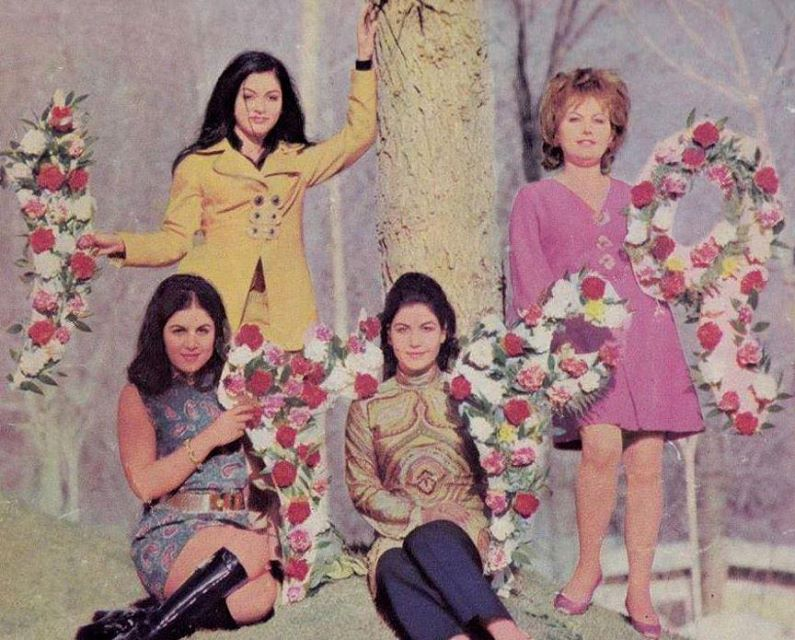
Googoosh, Pouri Banayi, Irene Zazians and Fariba Khatami (1970s)

- Amin Amini
- Behrouz Vossoughi
- Mohammad Ali Fardin
- Naser Malek Motiei
- Googoosh
- Forouzan
- Susan Taslimi
- Hamideh Kheirabadi
- Shahla Riahi
- Bahman Mofid
- Pouri Banayi
- Iraj Ghaderi
- Irene Zazians
- Saeed Kangarani
- Fariba Khatami
- Morteza Aghili
- Jamshid Mashayekhi
- Ezzatollah Entezami
- Ali Nasirian
- Davood Rashidi
- Mohammad-Ali Keshavarz

== Notable films ==
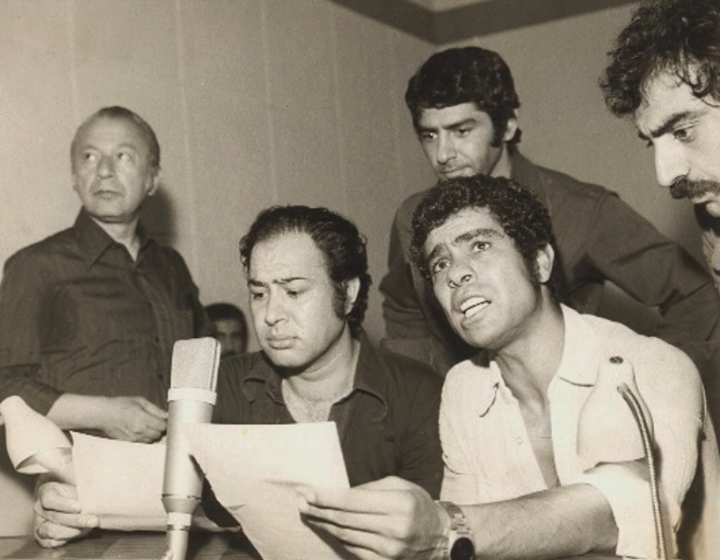
Gavaznha Dubbing 1974 - From Right Masoud Kimiai, Behrouz Vossoughi, Faramarz Gharibian, Hossein Erfani and Ali Kasmayi.

- Bot (Idol)
- Noghre Dagh
- Koocheh Marda
- The Cow
- Qeysar
- The House is Black
- Caravans
- The Traveller
- Dar Emtedade Shab
- The Beehive
- Lor Girl
- Subah-O-Shaam
- Leyli and Majnun
- The Deers
- The Chess Game of the Wind
- Ganj-e Qarun
- Ballad of Tara
- Sooteh-Delan

== See also ==
- Cinema of Iran
- Iranian New Wave
- Persian Film
