= List of Iranian films of the 1960s =

A list of films produced in Iran ordered by year of release in the 1960s. For an alphabetical list of Iranian films see Category:Iranian films

== 1960s ==
Year	Title	Director	Actors	Genre	Notability
1960					
1961	Fire and Ashes				
1962	The House is Black	Foroogh Farrokhzad		short documentary	A look at life and suffering in a leper colony
1963					
1964					
1965	Ganj-e Qarun	Siamak Yasemi	Fardin, Forouzan, Arman	Romance, Drama	
1965	Adobe and Mirror			Drama	Considered as the beginning of Iranian New Wave
1965	Shabe Quzi				
1965	The Bride of The Sea				
1966					
1967	The Night it Rained				
1967	Dalahoo	Siamak Yasemi	Behrouz Vossoughi, Forouzan, Arman, Jahangir Ghaffari	Drama, Romance, Adventure	
1968	The King of Hearts	Mohammad Ali Fardin	Fardin, Azar Shiva, Leila Fouruhar, Homayoun	Romance, drama, musical	
1968	Yousaf Va Zulaykha / Yusuf İle Züleyha	Mehdi Raisifirooz	Cüneyt Arkın, Forouzan, Yasamin	Historical, Romance	Iranian-Turkish co-production film
1969	Gaav	Dariush Mehrjui	Ezzatollah Entezami	Drama	
1969	Qeysar	Masoud Kimiai	Behrooz Vossoughi, Pouri Banayi, Naser Malek Motiee	Crime/Drama	
1969	Donyaye por Omid				
1969	Heaven is Never a Great Distance				
