= Heaven Is Never a Great Distance =

1969 film by Ismail Riahi

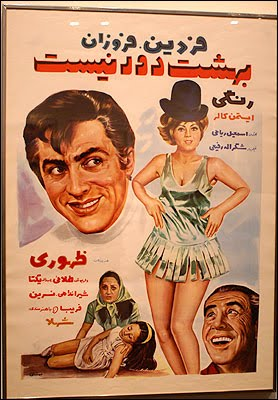
- Directed by: Esmaeil Riahi
- Written by: Esmaeil Riahi
- Produced by: Nataeil Zaboulani
- Starring: Mohammad Ali Fardin; Asadolah Yekta; Forouzan; Taghi Zohouri
- Release date: 1969
- Running time: 90 minutes
- Country: Iran
- Language: Persian

Heaven Is Never a Great Distance (Persian title: Behesht door nist- Persian: بهشت دور نیست) is a 1969 Iranian Persian-genre dance Romantic film directed by Esmaeil Riahi and starring Mohammad Ali Fardin, Asadolah Yekta, Forouzan and Taghi Zohouri .

== Plot ==
A child who has lost his mother frequently inquires with his young uncle about her, but the uncle deceives him by saying she is in heaven and will someday return. One day, the kid inadvertently speaks on the phone with a woman who performs at a cabaret, believing she is his mother. Gradually, the woman becomes fond of the child, and the uncle finds himself falling for her as well. Ultimately, she makes the choice to leave the cabaret and move in with them, but the cabaret's owner objects. This leads to a confrontation between the uncle and the owner.
