= Leila Forouhar =

Iranian singer (born 1959)

- لیلا فروهر
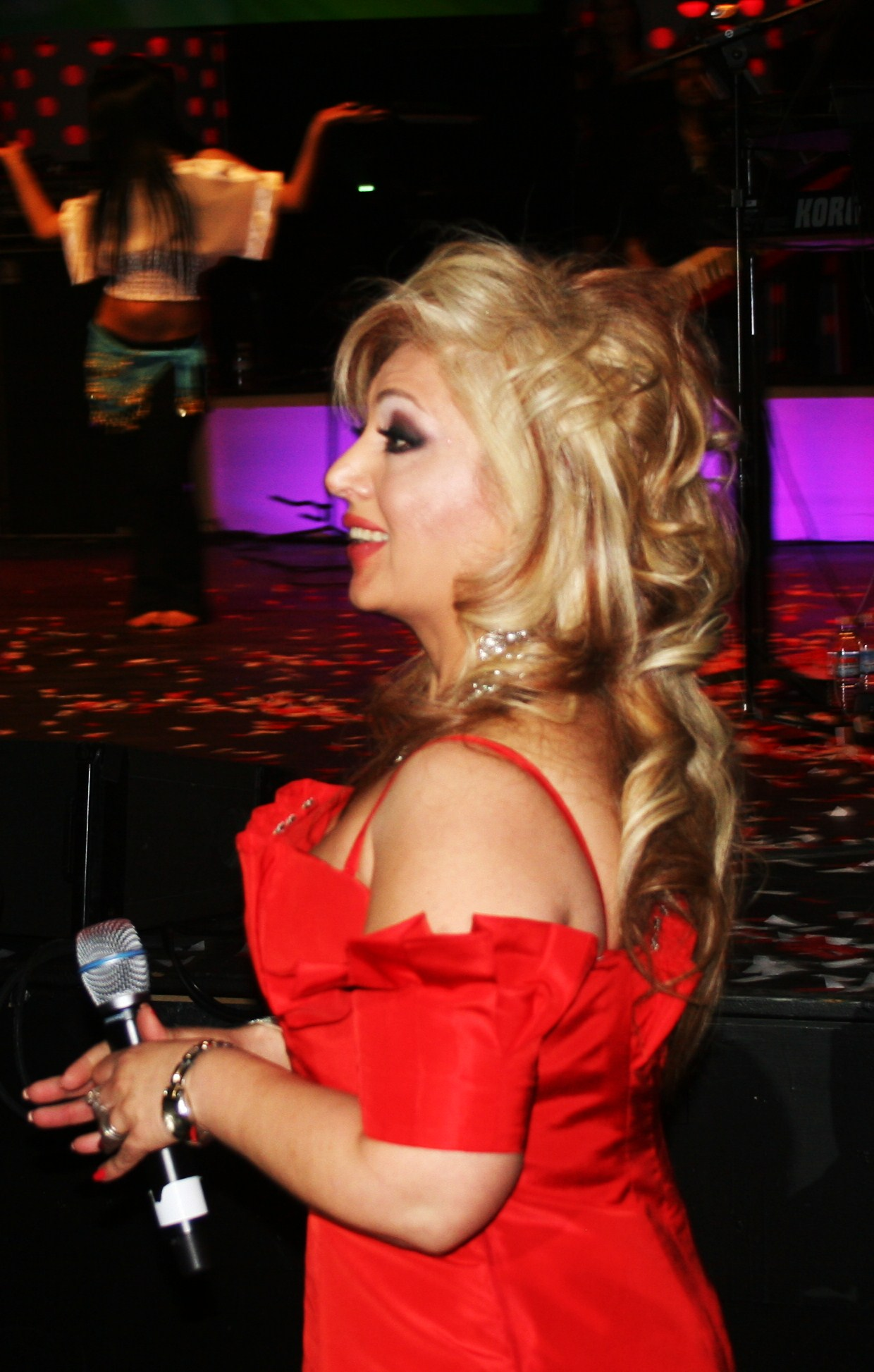
- Born: 23 February 1959 (age 67); Isfahan, Iran
- Occupations: Singer; actress
- Years active: 1968–present
- Spouse: Esmaeil Nabi (m. 2004)
- Father: Jahangir Forouhar
- Relatives: Reza Aslan (nephew)
- Musical career
- Genres: Dance; pop; classical
- Labels: Caltex; Pars; Taraneh; Avang

Leila Forouhar (Persian: لیلا فروهر, Leilâ Foruhar; born 23 February 1959) is an Iranian singer and former actress.

Born in Isfahan as the daughter to actor Jahangir Forouhar, she initially pursued a career as an actress and, seven years after the 1979 Iranian Revolution, migrated first from Turkey to Los Angeles in 1986, and then settled in Los Angeles, United States, from 1988.

Forouhar is the daughter of two Iranian actors, Jahangir Forouhar and Farangis Farahzadi. She began acting in films at the age of five and entered the music industry at 14. Before the revolution, she appeared in over 45 Iranian films, and after migrating to the United States, she released more than 20 albums. In 2010, Forouhar performed at a Nowruz celebration at the Thomas Jefferson Building of the Library of Congress.

== Early life ==
Leila Forouhar was born on 23 February 1959 in Isfahan, Iran, into an artistic family with actor parents, Jahangir Forouhar and Farangis Farahzadi. She began performing on stage at the age of three, acting in various theatrical productions at the Sepahan Theater in Isfahan alongside her parents and the renowned theater artist Arham Sadr. Also, collaborating with Zana Lajani, an active and influential artist in the theater field, provided another opportunity for the growth and flourishing of her artistic talents and played an important role in expanding her stage and professional experiences.

== Artistic career ==
Forouhar started her artistic career as a child, appearing in films such as Morad and Laleh and Khorus Jangi. At nine, she acted alongside Mohammad Ali Fardin in the film Soltan-e Ghalbha. Her performance in Soltan-e Ghalbha was so well-received that Fardin organized a celebration for her birthday at the Artists’ Syndicate. She also starred with Behrouz Vossoughi in the film "Man Ham Geryeh Kardam". During her teenage years, Forouhar acted in several films, including Mihman, Gol-e Khashkhash, Ezterab, and Shab-e Aftabi.

At 14, she began professional singing training and created works such as Shamim, Delam Tangeh, Do Parandeh, Kalaagh-haye Khabarchin, Niaz, Cheshmeh-ye Noor, and Julin. Forouhar is among the singers capable of performing both pop and traditional Persian music.

In the final days of 1978, she performed in the play Afrit-e Machin, directed by Reza Mirlouhi, which combined traditional Iranian theatrical elements. The production featured Forouhar singing and acting alongside her parents, Jahangir Forouhar and Farangis Farahzadi, as well as Morteza Aghili, Mohammad Motie, Enayat Bakhshi, Behrouz Behnejad, Bahram Vatanparast, and Mohammad Varshochi.

=== Migration ===
Following the 1979 Iranian Revolution, Forouhar was summoned to the Islamic Revolutionary Courts. Due to the ban on women’s singing and other challenges, she left Iran in 1986, initially traveling to Turkey. From there, she went to Germany and, after four days, moved to France, where she reunited with her mother, sister, and brother after a year of separation.

In 1988, she migrated to the United States and settled in Los Angeles, where she continued performing in concerts and producing new albums. She also acted in several television plays, the most notable being Shahr-e Farang alongside Parviz Kardan, Shahram Shabpareh, and Fariba Forouhar, as well as Matab and Kalantari, featuring Shohreh Aghdashloo and Houshang Touzie.

In 1999, Forouhar performed in the play One Samad and Two Leilas with Iranian artist Parviz Sayyad and Fariba Forouhar. The play, inspired by her personal experiences, interrogations, and migration, holds the record for the most performances of an Iranian theater production outside Iran.

=== Participation in International Nowruz Celebration ===
Another milestone in Forouhar's career was her participation in the International Nowruz Celebration organized by the Nowruz Commission at the Thomas Jefferson Building of the Library of Congress in the United States. She was invited as a Persian-speaking artist and singer. (The Nowruz Commission is a cultural and artistic organization formed by Iranians residing in the United States and ambassadors from Western and Central Asia, aimed at promoting the culture and traditions of Persian-speaking communities.)

== Personal life ==
On 20 August 2004, Leila Forouhar married Esmaeil Nabi and relocated to Orange County, California. Reza Aslan is her nephew.

== Concerts ==
Before releasing her album Makhmal-e Naz, Leila Forouhar had prepared an album in a traditional style but, following suggestions from colleagues and companies, chose not to release it and instead debuted with Makhmal-e Naz, for which she composed the music herself. Following the success of her albums, she held numerous concerts in various countries worldwide.

Forouhar was the first Iranian artist to perform in Dubai and also held performances in Japan. At the invitation of Tajikistan, she performed in cities such as Dushanbe and Kulob, with audiences ranging from 10,000 to 15,000 attendees.

=== Kodak Theatre Concert ===
Among Forouhar's notable achievements is performing three concerts at the Kodak Theatre, the venue for the Academy Awards. She performed there in 2003, 2008, and 2018.

=== Royce Hall Concert ===
For the first time, Forouhar performed her album Az Ghalb-e Man live on stage. Accompanied by the Rumi Ensemble and Shohreh Aghdashloo, with a 26-member orchestra led by Amir Badakhsh, she presented the live performance of the album at the prestigious Royce Hall. The event, described as a night of love, mysticism, and authentic Iranian music, was dedicated to Iranians living in the United States.

== Discography ==
Unknown release

- 1974: Hadis

Avang Records releases

- 1977: Leila Forouhar 2 (Ham Parvaz)

Caltex Records releases

- 1990: Makhmal-e-Naz
- 1991: Hedieh (with Shahram Solati)
- 1991: Shance
- 1994: Attal Mattal (with Ebi)
- 1995: Heartbeat
- 1996: Mirage
- 1997: Love Songs
- 1997: Planet of Harmony
- 1997: Dance Beat
- 1998: Love Story
- 1999: Didar (with Shahram Shabpareh)
- 1999: Yek Samado Do Leila (soundtrack from the play "Yek Samado Do Leila")
- 2000: Photo
- 2001: Story of Yours, Story of Mine
- 2003: Live in Concert at the Kodak Theatre
- 2005: A Kiss
- 2008: Jooni Joonom (Song)
- 2008: My Moon
- 2012: From My Heart

Taraneh Record releases

- 1993: Hamsafar
- 1994: Do Parandeh
- 2012: From My Heart

Pars Video releases

- 1990: Makhmal-e-Naaz
- 1994: Parandeha (with Mahasti and Shahram Solati)
- 1999: Ghahremanane Vatan (with Andy and Dariush)

MZM Records releases

- 1992: Bahaaneh
- 2008: Maahe Man

Other Records releases

- 2000: Lets party (with Maxim & The Boyz)

Single tracks

- 1992: Nobahar (with other singers)
- 1994: Telesm (With Shamaei zadeh)
- 1996: Zamin larzid (with other singers)
- 2003: Sayad Nova
- 2006: Music (with 23 singers)
- 2007: IRAN(with Omid Soltani)
- 2007: The Memories (dedicated to Mahasti)
- 2009: Bedoon IRAN Nemimireh
- 2011: Do Parandeh (Remix)
- 2013: Kaashki
- 2013: Eshgham
- 2014: Ba Tou
- 2014: Khayli Hasasam
- 2014: Fereshtehaye Kucholo
- 2015: Kheili Douset Daram
- 2016: In Rooza
- 2016: Hesse Taraneh
- 2017: Begoo Baa Mani

=== Memory of Mahasti ===
Following Mahasti’s passing in 2007, Leila Forouhar was one of four Iranian female singers—alongside Sepideh, Hengameh, and Helen, invited by the Tapesh Network to create a song in memory of Mahasti. The song was released after Mahasti’s death.

=== Az Ghalb-e Man ===
A few days before Nowruz 1391 (2012), Leila Forouhar released the album Az Ghalb-e Man. The album features poems by classical Iranian poets such as Rumi, Eraqi, and Hafez, as well as contemporary poets including Fereydoon Moshiri, Rahi Moayyeri, and Simin Behbahani. The songs were composed and arranged by the Rumi Ensemble. Shohreh Aghdashloo also collaborated on the album, providing English recitations of the lyrics.

=== Videography ===
- Rouzegar (VHS)
- The Return (VHS)
- Flashback (VHS)
- A Kiss (DVD)
- Live in Concert at the Kodak Theatre (DVD)
- 4 DVD Collection #1

== Filmography ==
- Khak
- King of Hearts (1968)
- Aramesh dar Hozooreh Digaraan
- Baagheh Boloor
- Shabeh Aftabi
- Ezteraab
- Four Sisters
- The Thirsty Ones
- Morad & laleh
- Iman
- The Beauty Sin
- Golden Cage
- The Springtime Connection
- Gorbe Koor

== See also ==
- List of Iranian women musicians
