= The Cycle (1975 film) =

- Film poster
- Directed by: Dariush Mehrjui
- Written by: Dariush Mehrjui
- Based on: The play "Aashghaal-duni" by Gholam-Hossein Saedi
- Produced by: Parviz Sayyad; Bahman Farmanara; Malek-Sasan Veisi
- Starring: Saeed Kangarani; Ezzatollah Entezami; Ali Nassirian; Esmail Mohammadi; Forouzan; Bahman Forsi
- Cinematography: Houshang Baharlou
- Edited by: Talat Mirfendereski
- Music by: Hormoz Farhat
- Release date: April 12, 1978 (Iran)
- Running time: 101 minutes
- Country: Iran
- Language: Persian
- Box office: Over 16 million rials

The Cycle (Persian: دایرهٔ مینا, Dayereh-ye Mina, also Romanized as Dāyere-ye Minā) is a 1975 Iranian drama film directed and written by Dariush Mehrjui. It is about a young man who is trying to get money to pay for his ailing father's medical treatments and gets sucked into life on the margins of society, exploiting other poor and marginalized people for their blood. The film stars Saeed Kangarani, Ezzatollah Entezami, Ali Nassirian and Forouzan.

After years of being banned, the film was released in Iran on April 12, 1978. It was Iran's submission for Best Foreign Language Film at the 50th Academy Awards, the first year Iran participated in the competition, and the country's first and only submission from the Shah era before the 1979 Iranian Revolution.

== Plot ==
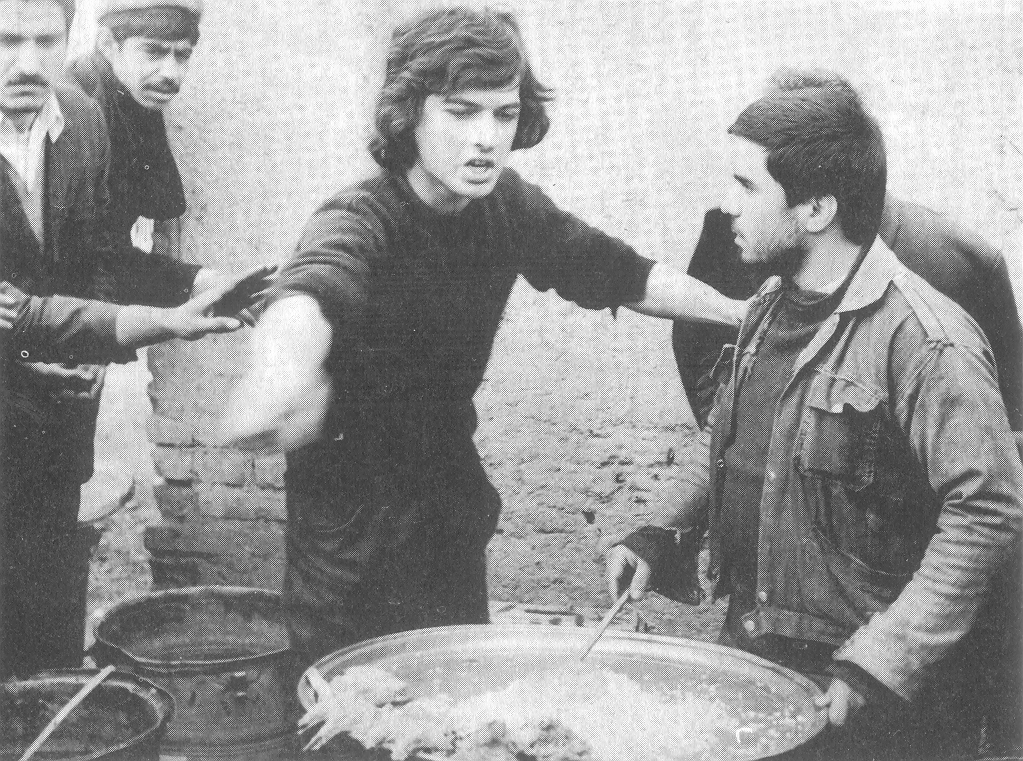
Saeed Kangarani portraying Ali

A young man named Ali living along with his family in the suburbs of Tehran, takes his diseased father, Esmail, to a large hospital, but is unable to pay for Esmail's reception and spends a few days outside until he meets Doctor Sameri. Esmail requests Sameri's help; and the latter arranges a location for them. They arrive and Sameri tells them to enter a truck containing a few other people. Ali and Esmail keep asking questions, but do not get answers. They arrive at a laboratory where people's blood is bought. Esmail refuses, but Ali sells some blood in exchange for 20 tomans. Sameri is revealed to be a blood dealer buying the blood of the poor and the addicted with little money and selling it to hospitals. During the time at the hospital with Esmail, Ali meets a young nurse named Zahra. Sameri convinces Ali to work for him and find blood sellers. Esmail's condition keeps getting worse until he dies. Ali continues progressing in his career and starts a new life.

== Cast ==
- Saeed Kangarani as Ali
- Ezzatolah Entezami as Dr. Sameri
- Forouzan as Zahra
- Ali Nassirian as Esmail
- Bahman Fersi as Doctor Davoudzadeh
- Esmail Mohammadi as Ali's Father
- Rafi Halati as a physician
- Soroush Khalili as the hospital chef
- Iraj Rad as an intern
- Mohammad Motii as a blood dealer
- Jamshid Layeg as a physician

== Production ==
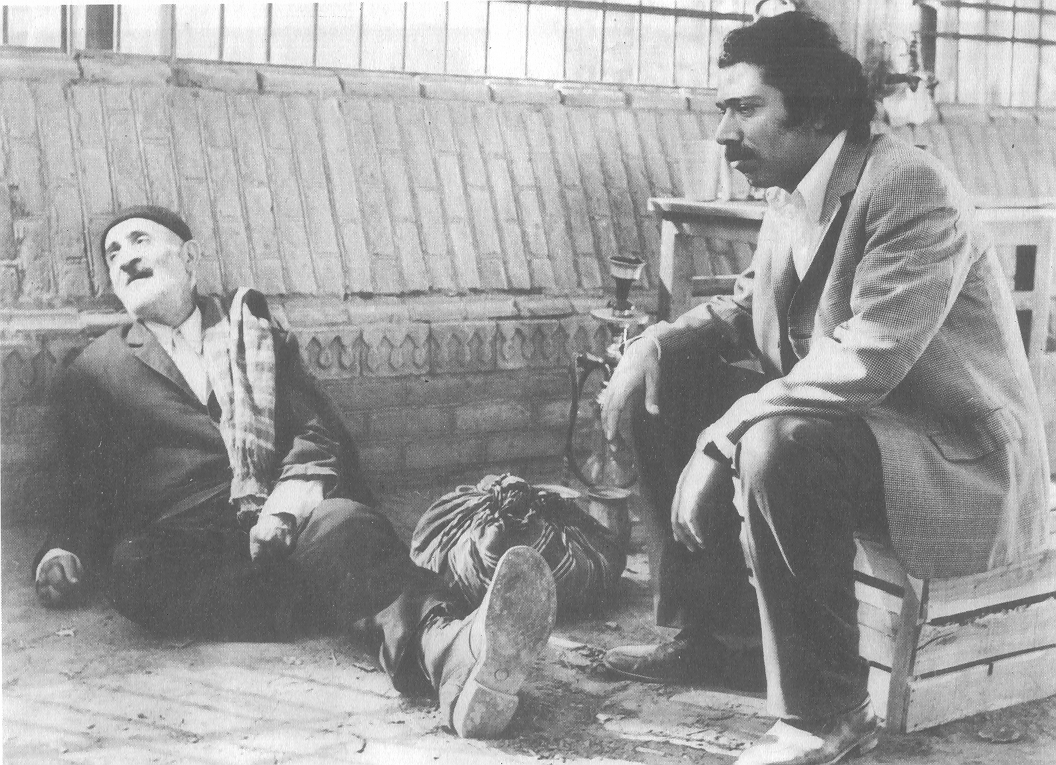
Ali Nassirian (portraying Esmail) and Esmail Mohammadi (portraying Ali's father) in a scene of the Cycle

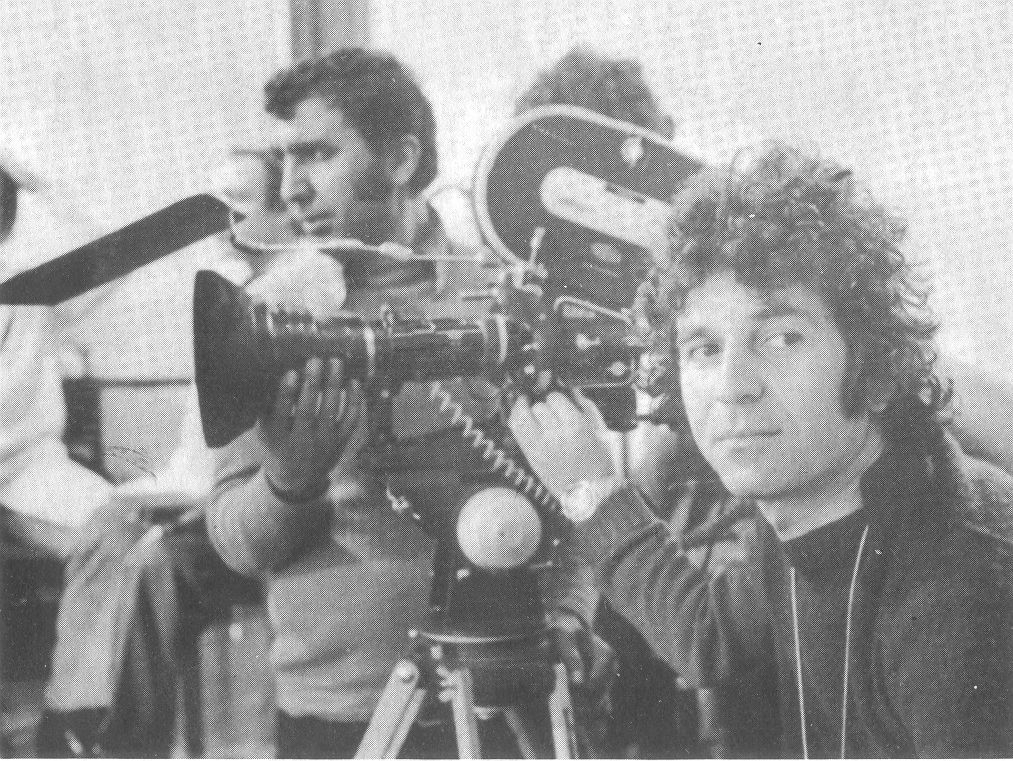
Dariush Mehrjui behind the scenes of the Cycle

After The Cow, which was an adaptation of Gholam-Hossein Sa'edi's series of novels titled "The Bayal Grievers", The Cycle is the second film that Mehrjui has made based on a novel by Sa'edi and with his contribution. The screenplay of The Cycle is adapted from the novel "Junkyard" of the series "Grave and Cradle". Mehrjui achieves a perfect social realism in The Cycle. A large part of this success is, like The Cow, from Sa'edi's writing. Sa'edi cooperated with Mehrjui and the crew during review and even production. Entezami, who portrays Sameri, comments: "After all, the procedure was like before while you were working with Mehrjui, and the same for the specifics of the character Sameri and his ethical and behavioral attributes; but this time Dr. Sa'edi was present too and every time I worked on a novel by him, it was that way. I always talked to Dr. Sa'edi and used his help." The changes that the film has relative to the novel are mostly due to artistic necessities or because of the more restricted censorship in cinema than in books. Javad Tusi writes at the footer of an article about Mehrjui's "Shirak" film: "Sa'edi emphasizes on the fall of the character Ali in the novel Junkyard by stating the cooperation of Ali with SAVAK agents for exposing and arresting the protesting physician of the hospital; but Mehrjui shows the retrograde process of the character Ali in The Cycle by his indifference towards his father's death due to the impossibility of explicitly stating the former during the time." About that, Omid Roshan-Zamir writes: "Mehrjui has chosen the same realistic style of Sa'edi's in adaptation of this novel and shows the events without redundancy, with a designated method. Due to the circumstances during the time of the production of the film, the part of Ali being a snitch is put aside and instead, the story of a young doctor, who tries to establish a blood laboratory in order to neutralize the blood dealer who sells infected blood to hospitals, is added."

== Release ==
The Cycle was produced in 1974, but did not achieve its warrant until 1977, and premiered in Paris Festival on 1977 fall and in Berlin Festival on 1978 winter. But it had its wide release on April 12, 1978 in Iran and attracted the attention of the audience and the critics. "The release of The Cycle was, after a four-year delay, on the screen for five weeks on Cinema Atlantik and six weeks on Cinema Diana and grossed more than 16 million rials. In addition to general reception, the film received the praise of the specialists and the critics."

== Reception ==
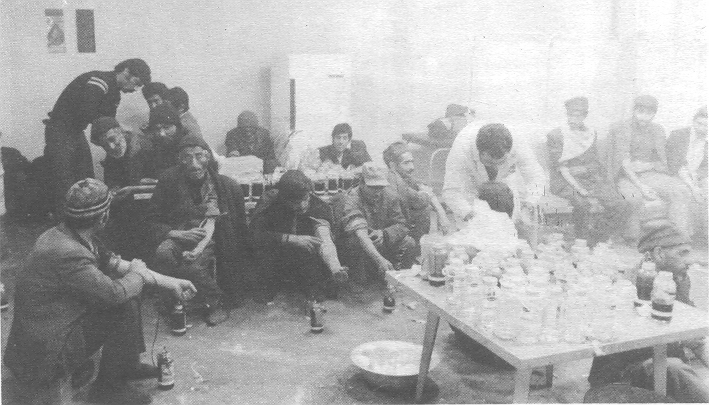
A scene of the Cycle, the poor selling blood

Like the rest of Mehrjui's films, The Cycle went under a lot of review and many critical statements were written about it at Iranian and foreign journals. The brave subject of the film, the multiple-year ban and the use of commercial cinema stars like Forouzan, made The Cycle the most controversial product of Mehrjui's.

The Cycle premiered in multiple festivals like Paris, Berlin, Valladolid (Spain), Cinematic Ontario (Canada), Boston Fine Arts Museum (U.S), Hong Kong International Film Festival,... and achieved some awards. It was submitted for Best Foreign Language Film at the 50th Academy Awards.

=== Critical response ===
- "Even if The Cycle isn't the best of Mehrjui's works, it's undoubtedly his most bright and simple film; it's a film that even if it doesn't warn, it, at least, doesn't make you feel sleepy... As an editor, Tal'at Mirfendersky has an accurate knowledge of the rhythm of the film and her montage has a relative but logical accordance with the movement of the storyline. As the director of photography, Houshang Baharloo still does a brilliant work; especially in the external scenes and open views... Farshid Mesghali, after the meaningful title sequence of "Mr. Stupid", is the set designer of the film this time, which is another positive point for it."
- "The Cycle is a weak, ill-stated and, in some cases, fake cinematic work. The film has attractiveness only in the first fifteen minutes (until the introduction of Dr. Davoudzadeh), since it puts us in front of some addict, badly shaped, molded and ugly people who sell their life potion for their daily food, and their desperation brings grief for the audience."
- "The Cycle is dependent on a type of cinema which I call "direct cinema" (not " cinéma vérité " or "documentary cinema"). The feature of direct cinema is that the quest for cause and effect goes on in a parallel way."
- "The Cycle is a dirty and painful blister that bursts with the blade of Gholam-Hossein Sa'edi's realism and Dariush Mehrjui's awareness, and its infection makes it difficult to breathe."
- "The Cycle also has many good features originating from the smartness and visual view of the filmmaker that has of course brought up a fruitful result by the help of Houshang Baharloo's nice filming and this shows the film as an analysis-worthy, excellent and respectable work."
- "I already knew that Dariush Mehrjui (the creator of the films "The Cow", "Stupid" and "The Post Officer") is undoubtedly the best and most original Iranian director. By seeing The Cycle, which is an allegory in the form of a film, we get more resilient in this belief of ours.
- "The Iranian film "The Cycle" directed by Dariush Mehrjui that was produced several years ago and was banned since the beginning, premiered in public theater today. When the warrant for the export of the film was issued, I doubted that the issue of such a warrant was in order to propagate that artists had liberty in Iran; since the Shah was under increasing criticism outside the country and these criticisms occurred because of his political procedures in Iran."
- "First, and before everything, it should be said that this film is amazing. It's filmed by Houshang Baharloo and is one of the best works I've seen this year."

=== Trivia ===
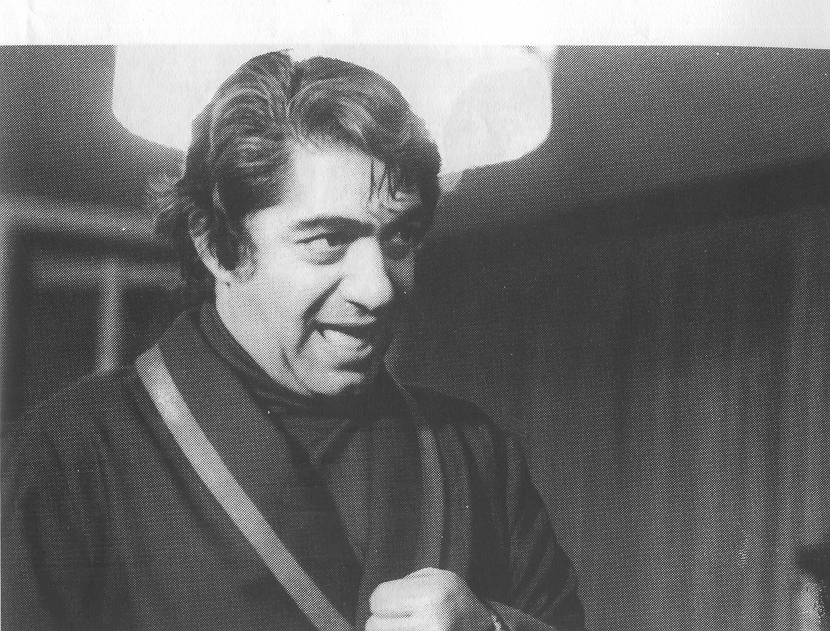
Ezzatolah Entezami portraying Sameri, the blood dealer

Forouzan's portrayal, either from the viewpoint of the critics who did not expect an actress from the commercial cinema to perform in a thoughtful film of Mehrjui's or from the public's point of view was interesting and controversial. About that, Entezami says: "When we went for shooting in Mashhad, an uproar started because of Forouzan's presence; and they were forced to escort her by a car to her residence after shooting. It was said that Mehrjui had picked her in order to guarantee the box office; whereas the truth was different." In an interview of Iraj Saberi and Mehrjui:

- Forouzan's contribution in this film was exciting for many. Why did you choose her?

- She fitted for Zahra well. Also, Forouzan is a good artist. She's disciplined and professional; and it'll be much better if she sits in her right place.

- Don't you think she's prettier than the book Zahra?

- Yes, I agree. The same can be said for Ali."

== See also ==
- List of submissions to the 50th Academy Awards for Best Foreign Language Film
- List of Iranian submissions for the Academy Award for Best Foreign Language Film
