= Shining Star (1969 film) =

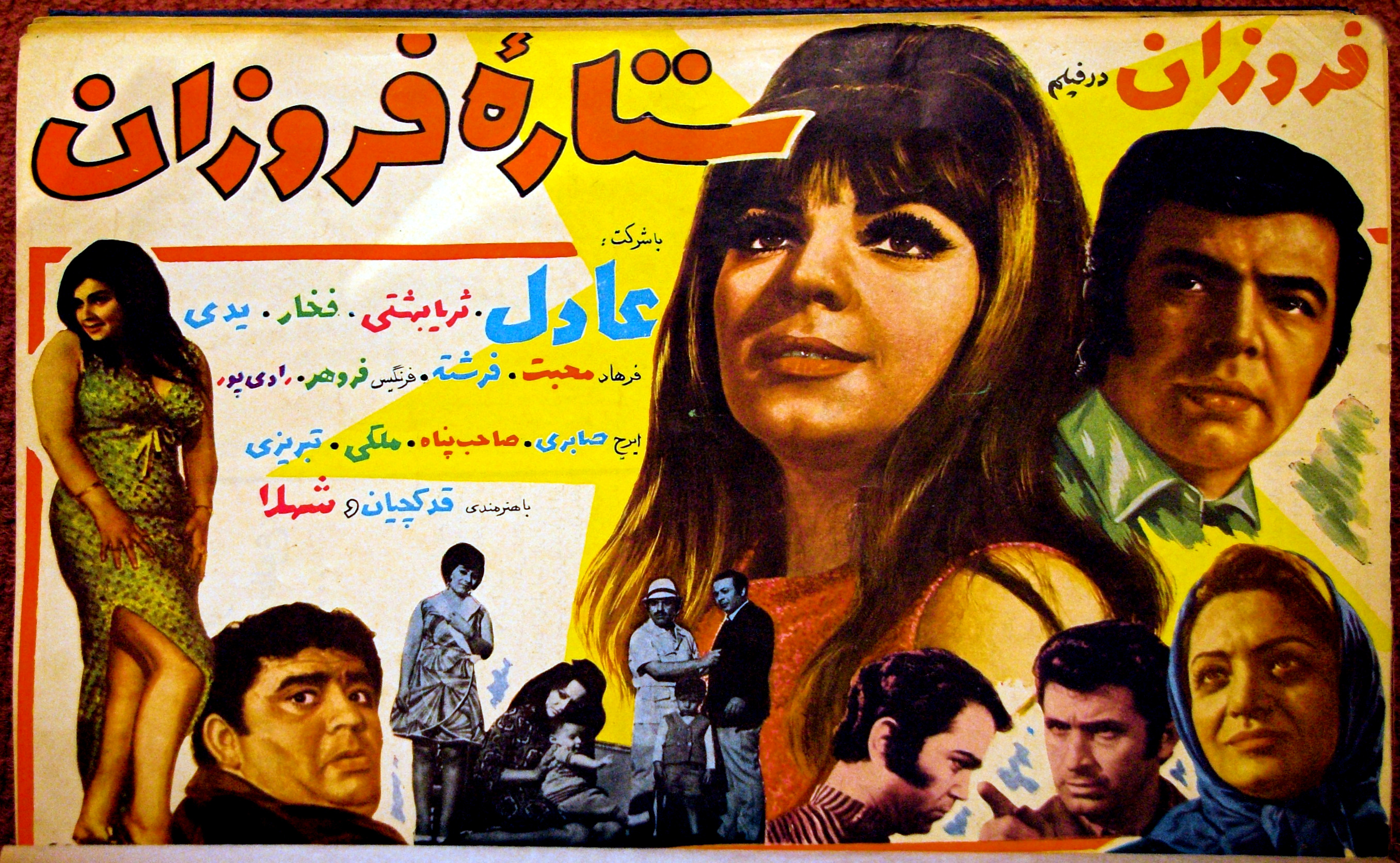
- Movie poster
- Directed by: Assadolah Soleymanifar
- Written by: Assadolah Soleymanifar
- Produced by: Mohammad Farzad
- Starring: Forouzan; Soraya Beheshti; Ahmad Ghadakchian; Ebrahim Fakhar; Farhad Mohabbat; Farangiss Forouhar; Yadollah Mohammadi Nejad (Yadi)
- Release date: 1969
- Running time: 90 minutes
- Country: Iran
- Language: Persian

Shining Star (Persian title: Setareh Forouzan- Persian: ستاره فروزان) is a 1969 Iranian Persian-genre drama film directed by Assadolah Soleymanifar and starring Forouzan, Soraya Beheshti, Ahmad Ghadakchian, Ebrahim Fakhar, Farhad Mohabbat, Farangiss Forouhar and Yadollah Mohammadi Nejad (Yadi).
