= Saeed Kangarani =

Iranian actor (1954–2018)

- سعید کنگرانی
- Born: Saeed Kangarani Farahani; 5 August 1954; Tehran, Iran
- Died: 14 September 2018 (aged 64); Tehran, Iran
- Occupation: Actor
- Children: 1

Saeed Kangarani (Persian: سعید کنگرانی; 5 August 1954 – 14 September 2018) was an Iranian actor.

He was a young actor during the pre-revolutionary Iranian cinema and didn't appear on the screens after the Iranian revolution until 2006 with the film, Marriage, Iranian Style. He died of heart attack on 14 September 2018.

== Filmography ==
- 2006 Marriage Iranian Style as Uncle Mehdi
- 1981 Bloody Season
- 1981 Gerdab
- 1980 Parvaz dar ghafas as Sohrab
- 1978 The Cycle as Ali
- 1978 Dar Emtedad-e Shab as Babak
- 1976 My Uncle Napoleon (television series) as Saeed
- 1976 The Custodian as Davood
- 1970 Reza Motorcyclist
