= Ganj-e Qarun =

- گنج قارون
- Directed by: Siamak Yasemi
- Written by: Siamak Yasemi; Ebrahim Zamani
- Produced by: Siamak Yasemi
- Starring: Mohammad Ali Fardin; Forouzan; Arman
- Release date: 1965
- Running time: 122 minutes
- Country: Iran
- Language: Persian

Ganj-e Qarun (Persian: گنج قارون) is a 1965 Iranian film directed by Siamak Yasemi and starring Mohammad Ali Fardin, Forouzan, Arman, and Taghi Zohouri.

== Background ==
In Persian folklore, Ganj-e Qarun (Qarun's Treasure) is a symbol of major wealth. Qarun is Persian for Korah, the biblical figure who lived contemporary to Moses.

== Plot ==
Ali Bigham is a happy-go-lucky young man who accidentally saves a rich old man's life named Qarun who is attempting suicide. Qarun is very wealthy but also sad and alone. He is ill and has no one to live with. Ali takes Qarun to his home and realizes that he is his own father who left him and his mother years ago. At first Ali rejects his father, but then Qarun gains his son's attention. Throughout the film Hasan accompanies Ali as a comedian.

== Cast ==
- Mohammad Ali Fardin as Ali Bigham
- Arman as Qarun
- Taghi Zohouri as Hassan Jeqjeqeh
- Forouzan as Shirin

== Place in Iranian film history ==
The film may be considered a good example of pre-revolution Persian-language films, "a form of popular cinema that embodied the aspirations and illusions" of a changing society. More specifically, it has been described as "a key progenitor of the stewpot or meat-and-potato movie genre".
