= Golden Dreams (1951 film) =

- Directed by: Moezzoddivan Fekri
- Written by: Moezzodivan Fekri
- Produced by: Ghodratollah Rashidian; Seifollah Rashidian
- Cinematography: Nuri Habib
- Production company: Madayen
- Release date: 19 February 1951
- Running time: 110 minutes
- Country: Iran
- Language: Persian

Golden Dreams (Persian: خواب‌های طلایی, translit. Khab-ha-ye Talayi) is a 1951 Iranian comedy film directed by Moezzodivan Fekri.

== Plot ==
A young man dreams that he has gained entry to the court of Shah Abbas and attained a position of distinction and respect. His dream then becomes reality when he is given permission to spend a day at the Safavid court.

== Cast ==
- Iran Daftari as Abolhassan's mother
- Moezzodivan Fekri as Sultan
- Ahmad Ghadakchian as Haji Mahmood
- Majid Mohseni as Abolhassan
- Shahla Riahi as Mah-peykar
- Parkhide

== Bibliography ==
- Mohammad Ali Issari. Cinema in Iran, 1900-1979. Scarecrow Press, 1989.
