= Ahmad Qadakchian =

Iranian actor

- احمد قدکچیان
- Born: 16 July 1920; Tehran, Iran
- Died: 8 December 2006 (aged 86); Tehran, Iran
- Occupation: Actor

Ahmad Ghadakchian (Persian: احمد قدکچیان; July 16, 1920 – December 8, 2006), was an Iranian actor. His son, Kamran Ghadakchian, is a director.

== Selected filmography ==
- Golden Dreams (1951)
- Gerdab (1953)
- Chehrehe ashna (1953)
- Gonahkar (1953)
- Dokhtare sar rahi (1953)
- Taghdir chenin boud (1954)
- Khab va khial (1955)
- Mahtabe khoonin (1955)
- Booseh madar (1956)
- Marjan (1956)
- Mardi ke ranj mibarad (1957)
- Nardebane taraghi (1957) - Ehsan
- Cheshm berah (1958)
- Inham yek jooreshe (1959)
- Doostane yekrang (1960)
- Safarali (1960)
- Ayenehe taksi (1960)
- Asemun jol (1960)
- Bache naneh (1960) - Mohsen Khan
- Afate zendegi ya morphin (1960)
- Fereshteh farari (1961)
- Dawme eshq (1961)
- Dam-e eshgh (1961)
- Dokhtarane hava (1961)
- Dokhtarha intowr doost darand (1962)
- Zan doshmane khatarnaki ast (1962)
- Lalehe atashin (1962)
- Kelid (1962) - Prosecutor
- Mosaferi az behesht (1963)
- Ghanoune zendegi (1964)
- Dozde shahr (1964)
- Setarehe sahra (1964)
- Morakhasi ejbari (1965)
- Darvazehe taghdir (1965)
- Shookhi nakon delkhor misham (1966) - Amin
- Pasdaran-e darya (1966)
- Hashem Khan (1966) - Professor
- Ghahreman-e dehkadeh (1966)
- Ghafas-e talayee (1966)
- Bist sal entezar (1966) - Abbas Agha
- Milionerhaye Gorosneh (1967) - Mohsen
- Koohzad (1967)
- Haft shahr-e eshgh (1967)
- Gozasht-e bozorg (1967)
- Setare-ye haft-asemoon (1968)
- Sange sabour (1968)
- Mojeze (1968)
- Man shohar mikham (1968)
- Loutye gharne bistom (1968)
- Dokhtar-e shaah-e parian (1968)
- Charkh-E-Bazigar (1968)
- Donya-ye poromid (1969)
- Tak-khal (1969)
- Shar-ashoob (1969)
- Shining Star (1969)
- Pesaran-e Gharoon (1969)
- Mardan-e roozegar (1969)
- Malek-e doozakh (1969)
- Kasebha-ye mahal (1969)
- Emshab dokhtari mimirad (1969)
- Leyli and Majnoon (1970)
- Ali Bi Gham (1970) - Morteza
- Sogoli (1970)
- Kamarband-e zarrin (1970)
- Hadesejooyan (1970)
- Ayyoob (1971) - Mirza Agha
- Mardan-e sahar (1971) - Mr. Moez
- Rosva-ye eshgh (1971)
- Pahlavan dar gharn-e atom (1971)
- Yek jo gheirat (1972)
- Saa'at-e Faje'e (1972)
- Mardan-e khalij (1972)
- Kakol-zari (1972)
- Golgo 13 (1973) - Max Boa
- Sarab (1973)
- Ghafas (1973)
- Dokhtaran-e bala, mardan-e naghola (1974)
- Havas (1975) - Rahmanzadeh
- Hasrat (1975)
- Hadaf (1975)
- Setiz (1976)
- Mard-e sharghi, zan-e farangi (1976)
- Jedal (1976)
- Khatoon (1977) - Malek
- The Red Line (1982) - Amani's father
- Khak o khoon (1983)
- Shilat (1984)
- Farar (1985)
- Tashrifat (1985)
- Bogzar zendegi konam (1986)
- Tamas (1990)
- Rah o birah (1991)
- Explosion in the Operation Room (1991)
- Nish (1995)
- Divanevar (1995) - (final film role)
