= The Crookes (film) =

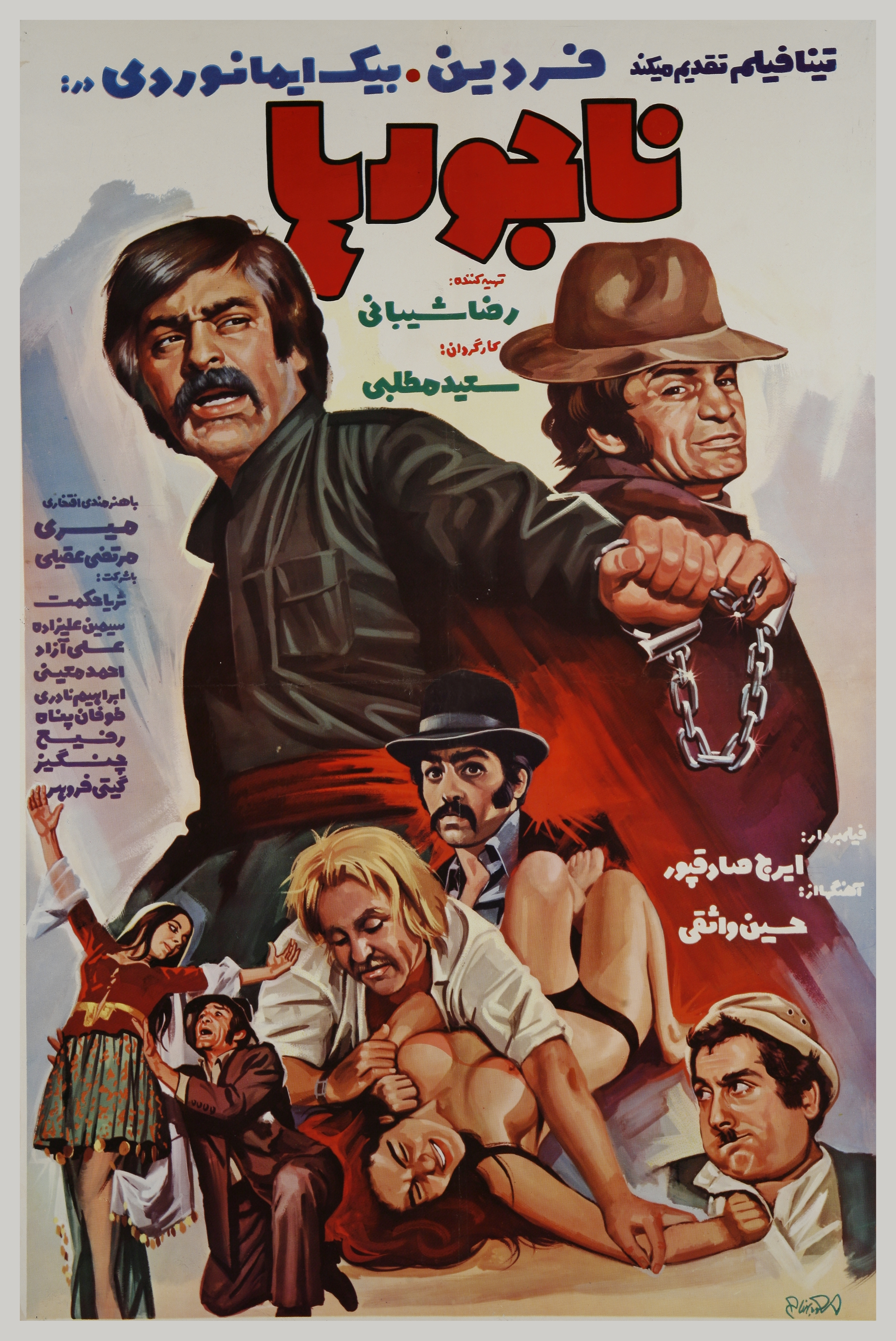
- Directed by: Saied Motallebi
- Written by: Reza Aghili
- Produced by: Reza Sheibaei
- Starring: Mohammad Ali Fardin; Reza Beyk Imanverdi; Morteza Aghili; Sorayya Hekmat; Ali Azad; Simin Alizadeh; Ali Miri
- Release date: 1974
- Running time: 89 minutes
- Country: Iran
- Language: Persian

The Crookes (Persian title: Najoorha- Persian: ناجورها) is a 1974 Iranian Persian-genre crime film directed by Saied Motallebi and starring Mohammad Ali Fardin, Reza Beyk Imanverdi, Morteza Aghili, Sorayya Hekmat, Ali Azad, Simin Alizadeh, and Ali Miri.
