= Dar Emtedad-e Shab =

Dar Emtedade Shab
- Theatrical poster
- Directed by: Parviz Sayyad
- Screenplay by: Parviz Sayyad; Zhila Sazegar
- Produced by: Bahman Farmanara
- Starring: Googoosh; Saeed Kangarani; Jahangir Forouhar; Mahbubeh Bayat
- Cinematography: Alireza Zarrindast
- Music by: Mojtaba Mirzadeh
- Release date: 8 February 1977
- Running time: 123 min
- Country: Iran
- Language: Persian

Dar Emtedad-e Shab (Persian: در امتداد شب, lit. 'Throughout the Night') is a 1977 Iranian drama film directed by Parviz Sayyad. It stars Iranian singer Googoosh and actor Saeed Kangarani.

== Plot ==
Parvaneh (Googoosh), who is a famous singer and movie star, has an affair with Kaveh (Naser Mamdouh) who has a family, after she gets divorced. A student named Baabak (Saeed Kangarani), who has leukaemia, falls in love with Parvaneh and writes her letters expressing his love. They meet and have a good time together for a while. Parvaneh hears about Baabak's disease and decides to send him abroad for medical treatment.

== Cast ==
- Googoosh as Parvaneh
- Saeed Kangarani as Baabak
- Malihe Nazari as Baabak's mother
- Naser Mamdouh as Kaveh
- Mahbubeh Bayat
