= Subah-O-Shaam =

Subah-O-Sham Homaye Saadet
- Directed by: Tapi Chanakya
- Written by: Kaushal Bharati; Som Haksar
- Starring: Mohammad Ali Fardin; Sanjeev Kumar; Waheeda Rehman
- Cinematography: Khani
- Music by: Laxmikant–Pyarelal
- Release dates: 21 March 1971 (Iran); 1972 (India)
- Running time: 188 minutes (Indian version); 147 minutes (Iranian version)
- Countries: India; Iran
- Languages: Hindi; Persian

Subah-O-Sham (Persian: همای سعادت) is a 1972 Indo-Iranian romantic film directed by Tapi Chanakya. The film was shot simultaneously in Hindi and Persian. The Iranian version was released as Homaye Saadet in 1971.

== Plot ==
The film is based in Tehran, Iran. Aarun falls in love with a beautiful dancer Shirin. Due to her dubious profession, Aarun and his brother Naseer decide to lie about her origins to their mother. Unfortunately, she finds out the truth and forbids Shirin from marrying her son. Aarun, believing Shirin has changed her mind and refused to marry him, is angered and marries another woman, Nazneen. Only Naseer knows the truth of why Shirin refused to marry Aarun. Years later, Aarun and Nazneen's son, Romil, becomes best friends with a fatherless boy, Razzaq, who invites Aarun to his home. When Aarun goes to his house, he finds out that Razzaq is his and Shirin's own son. Following the death of Nazneen, Aarun finally manages to convince his mother to accept Razzaq as her grandson, and Shirin as his wife.

== Cast ==
- Mohammad Ali Fardin as Aarum
- Sanjeev Kumar as Naaser
- Waheeda Rehman as Shirin
- Irene Zazians
- Mir Mohammad Tajaddod
- Simin Ghaffari
- Loreta
- Rafie
- Ali Miri
- Jamileh
- Meeri Kiukias
- Paiman
- Fadeer Khan

== Soundtrack ==
Subah-O-Shaam

Soundtrack album by Laxmikant–Pyarelal
- Released: 1972
- Recorded: 1972
- Genre: Soundtrack
- Length: 27:26
- Label: Saregama
- Producer: Laxmikant–Pyarelal

The soundtrack was composed by Laxmikant–Pyarelal.

All lyrics are written by Anand Bakshi.

Track list
No.	Title	Singer(s)	Length
1.	"Teri Meri Meri Teri Nazar"	Kishore Kumar, Asha Bhosle	5:05
2.	"Chhod Mera Haath Mujhe Peene"	Lata Mangeshkar	4:36
3.	"Mere Lal Aaj Tera Janam Din Hai"	Lata Mangeshkar	3:54
4.	"Saqi Ki Zaroorat Hai Na Jaam Ki "	Lata Mangeshkar	5:10
5.	"Meri Biwi Jahan Se Nirali Hain"	Mohammed Rafi	3:53
6.	"Tumko Mubarak Ho Ye Shadi Khana Aabadi"	Lata Mangeshkar	4:48
Total length:			27:26

=== Iranian version ===
All lyrics are written by Shahyar Ghanbari

- Mast Masti Kon - Googoosh
- Toor Sepi Rakht Dar - Googoosh
- Shapoor Koochooloo - Googoosh
