= Forouzan =

Iranian actress and film producer (1937–2016)

- فروزان
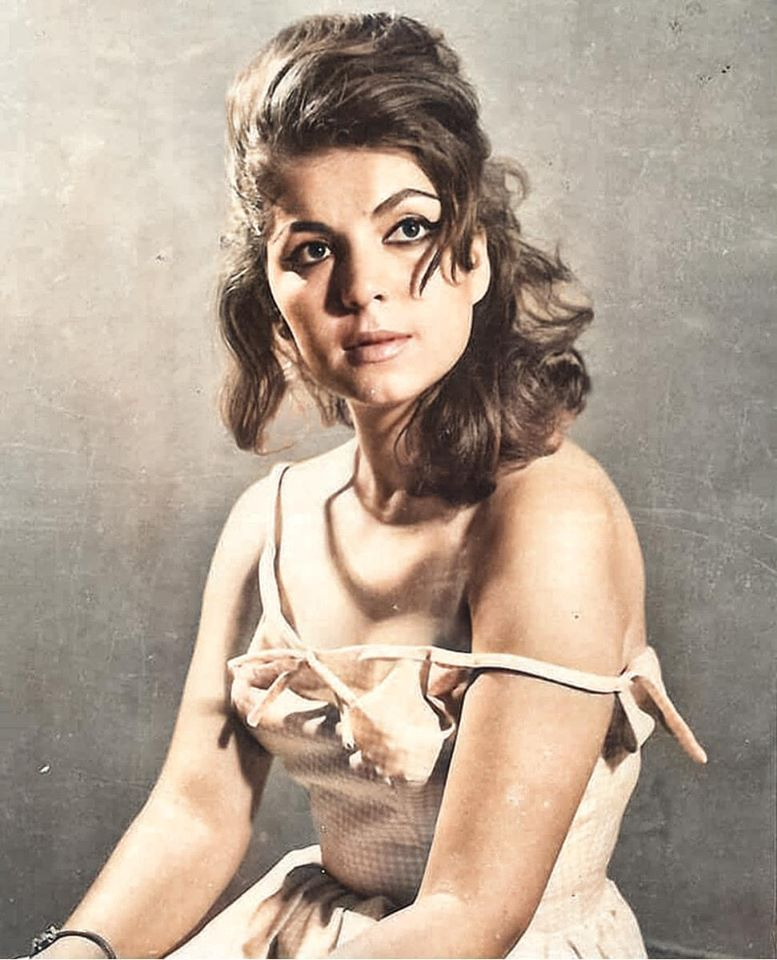
- Born: Parvin Kheyrbakhsh; 9 August 1937; Bandar-e Anzali, Imperial State of Iran
- Died: 24 January 2016 (aged 78); Tehran, Iran
- Resting place: Behesht-e Zahra Cemetery
- Occupations: Actress, producer, voice actress
- Years active: 1963–1979
- Children: 1

Parvin Kheirbakhsh (Persian: پروین خیربخش), better known as Forouzan (فروزان; 9 August 1937 – 24 January 2016) was an Iranian actress, producer, and dubbing artist.

She started her cinematic career as a voice-over actress. In 1964 she starred in Siamak Yasemi's Sāhele Entezār, but it was Ganj-e Qarun, another film by Yasemi, that made her very famous. She co-starred in this film with Fardin. After Ganj-e Qarun Fardin and Forouzan made a golden cinematic couple and co-starred in some of the highest-grossing films of the era, known as Persian Films or Film Farsi (in Persian: فیلمفارسی). Persian Film was the popular genre of movies produced in Iran before the Iranian revolution of 1979.

== Biography ==
Forouzan was born on 9 August 1937 in Bandar-e Anzali, Iran. She started her career by dubbing films. Her first movie was Sahel-e Entezar. She acted in many popular Iranian films and also worked with visionary directors of the Mowj-e Now, such as Dariush Mehrjui (Dayere-ye Mina) and Ali Hatami (Baba Shamal).

Siamak Yasemi, Iraj Ghaderi, Shapur Gharib and Fereydun Goleh were some of the other famous directors that she collaborated with.

After the 1979 revolution Forouzan was banned from playing in movies and grew more and more isolated. She rarely conducted interviews and died on 24 January 2016 in Tehran.

After Forouzan's death, Persian-language websites and forums dedicated posts and articles in her memory. Her popularity remained intact despite not having acted in a new film since 1978.

== Partial filmography ==
- 1963: Sahele entezar - Maryam
- 1964: The Humans - Goli
- 1964: The Pleasures of Sin - Sahar
- 1965: Gate of Fate
- 1965: Darvazehe taghdir
- 1965: The Bride of the Sea - Maryam
- 1965: Croesus' Treasure - Ganjeh Gharoon
- 1965: Dah saye khatarnak - Sepideh
- 1966: Shookhi nakon delkhor misham - Assal
- 1966: Shamsi pahlevoon - Shamsi
- 1966: Hashem khan - Mina
- 1966: Farar az haghighat
- 1967: Valley of Death
- 1967: Haft shahr-e eshgh
- 1967: Gohar-e shab-cheragh
- 1967: Dalahoo - Arezoo
- 1968: Shokoh-e-javanmardi
- 1968: Yusuf ile Züleyha - Züleyha
- 1968: The Dragon Gorge
- 1968: Tahran macerasi
- 1968: Setare-ye haft-asemoon
- 1968: Ghoroube botparastan
- 1968: The Daughter of the King of Fairies
- 1968: Charkh-E-Bazigar
- 1968: Chahar darvish
- 1968: Bazee-e Eshgh
- 1968: Separate beds
- 1968: It's Written in the Stars
- 1969: Tak-khal
- 1969: Shar-ashoob
- 1969: Setare-ye foroozan
- 1969: Mojeze-ye ghalbha
- 1969: Malek-e doozakh
- 1969: A Girl Is Going to Die Tonight
- 1969: Büyük yemin
- 1969: The Great Oath - Firuzan
- 1970: Mardi az jonoob-e shahr - Atash
- 1970: Sogoli
- 1970: Ram karadan-e mard-e vahshi
- 1970: Raghaseye shahr - Pari
- 1970: Jafar var Golnar - Golnar
- 1970: Bride of Bianca
- 1971: Ayyoob - Shahin / Maryam / Shirin
- 1971: Baba Shamal - Shokat-ol-molook
- 1971: Khosghel-e mahalle - Nazi
- 1971: Heydar - Aghdas
- 1971: Badnaam - Badri
- 1971: Atashpare-ye shahr
- 1972: Zafar
- 1972: Sahere
- 1972: Mikhak-e sefid
- 1972: Khaterkhah
- 1972: Ghalandar - Eshrat
- 1972: The Dagger - Banafsheh
- 1973: Parizad
- 1973: Nakhoda - Darya
- 1975: Gharar-e bozorg - Shirin
- 1976: Khodahafez koochooloo
- 1977: The Cycle - Zahra
- 1977: Back and Dagger - Pari (final film role)

== Gallery ==
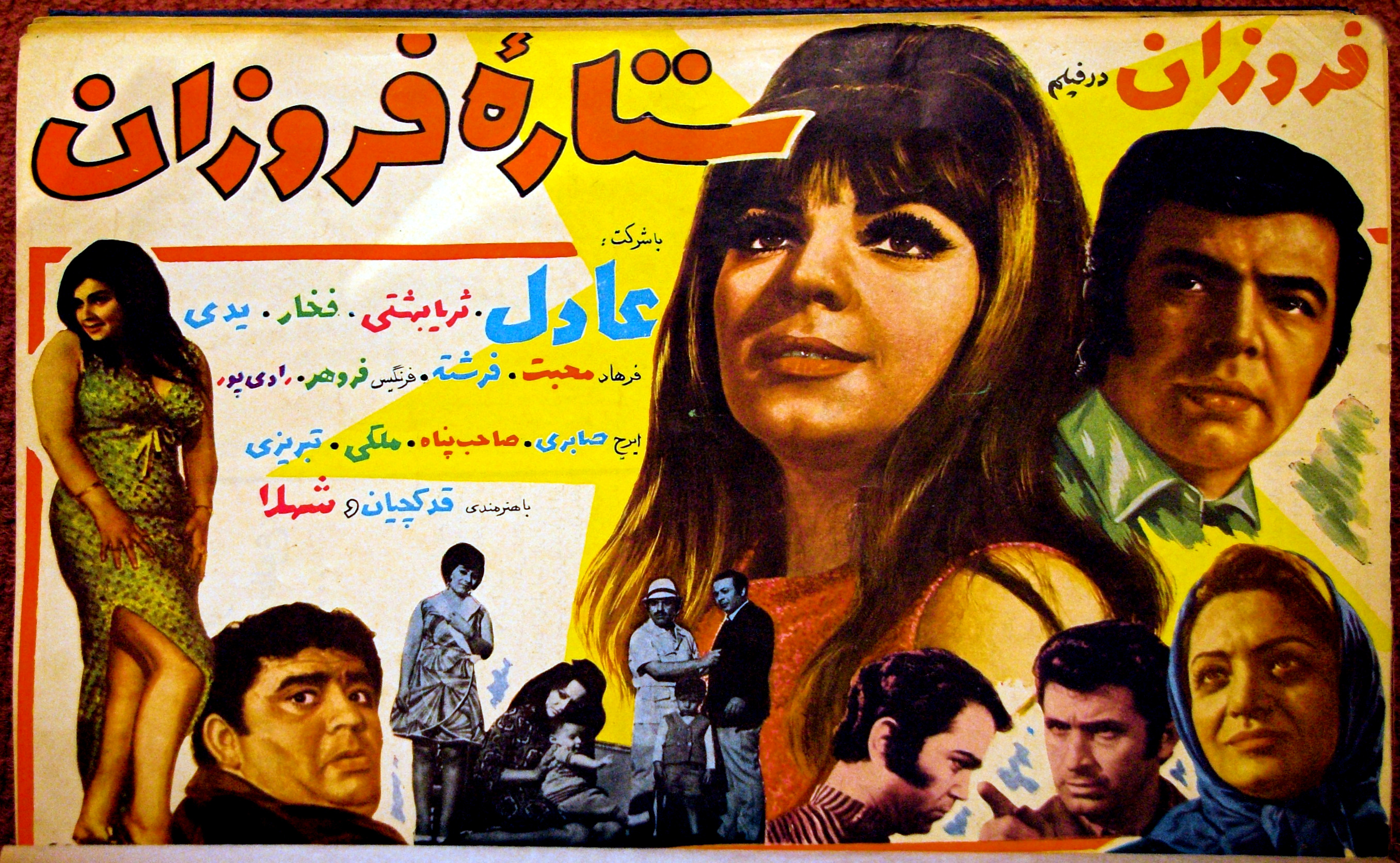
Shining Star is a 1969 Persian-genre drama film directed by Assadolah Soleymanifar and starring Forouzan.

Forouzan on the cover page of Persian weekly Ettelaat Haftegi, 1971

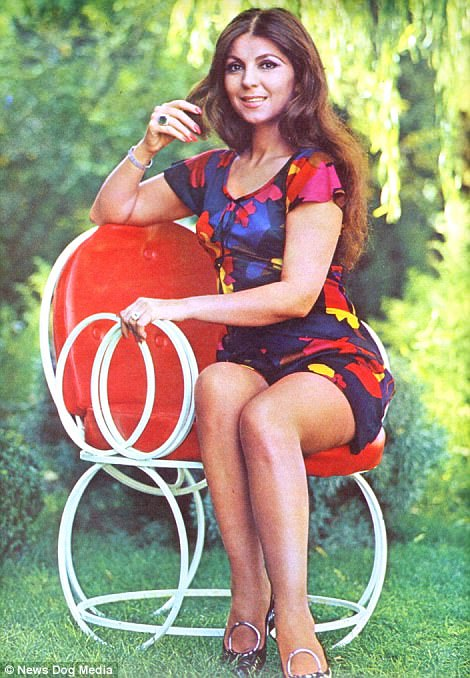
Forouzan in 1975

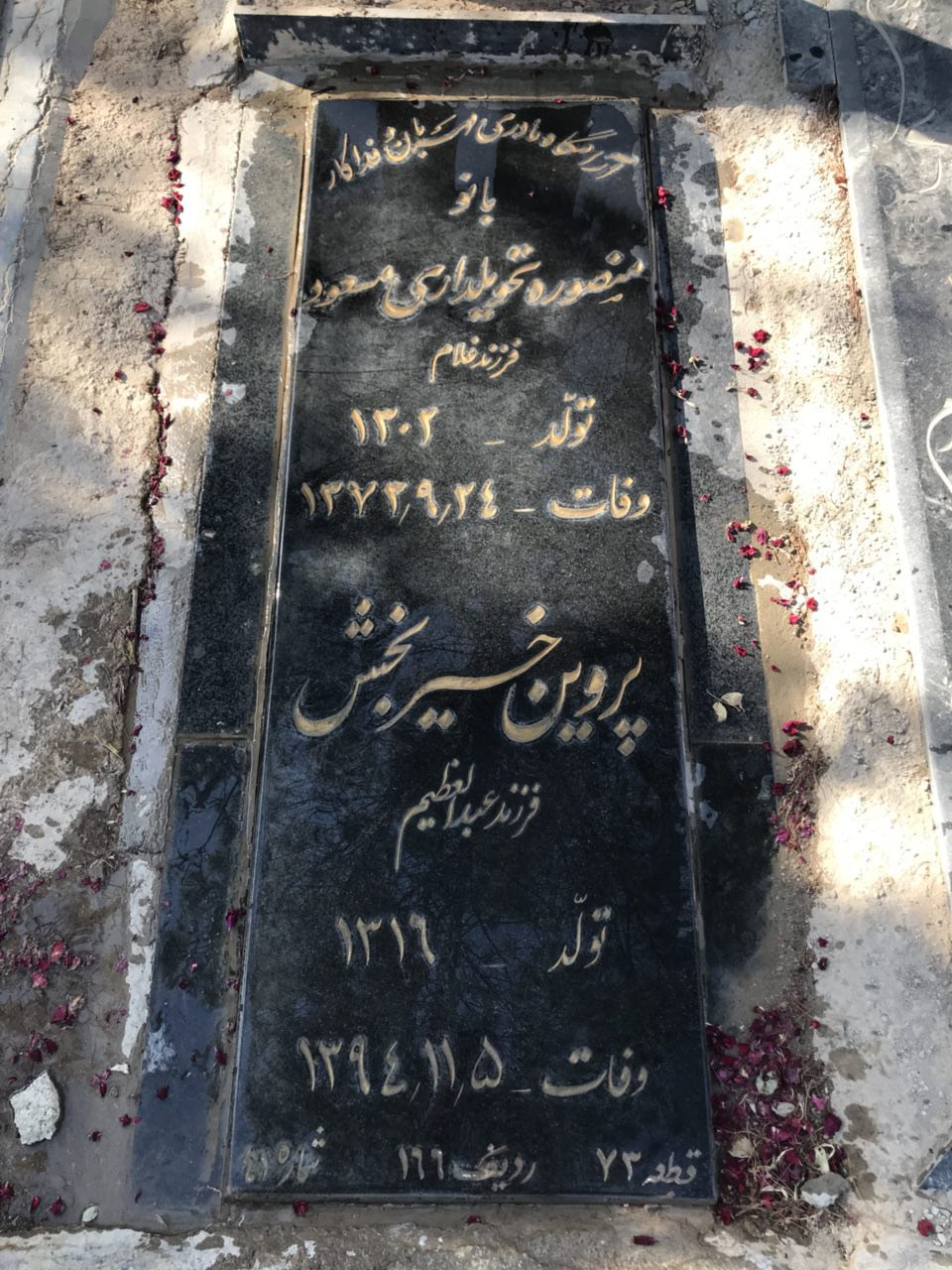
