= Jamshid Mashayekhi =

Iranian actor (1934–2019)

- جمشید مشایخی
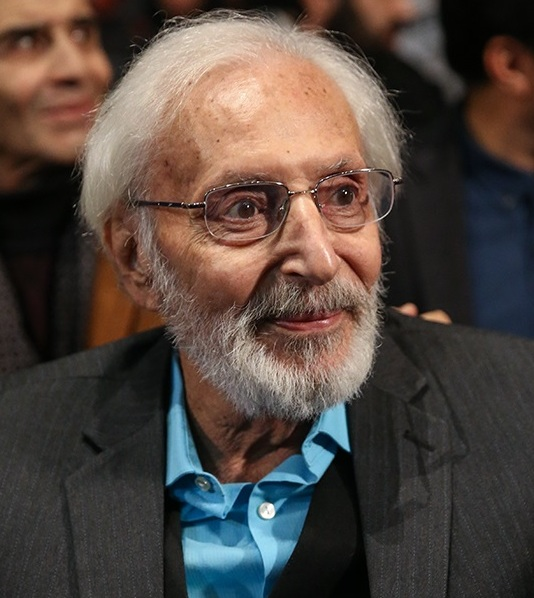
- Mashayekhi in 2018
- Born: November 26, 1934; Tehran, Iran
- Died: April 2, 2019 (aged 84); Tehran, Iran
- Resting place: Number 42 Grave, Artists Segment, Behesht-e Zahra Cemetery
- Occupations: Actor, humanitarian
- Years active: 1956–2018
- Spouse: Giti Raoufi (m. 1960)
- Children: 3, including Nader

Jamshid Mashayekhi (Persian: جمشید مشایخی, November 26, 1934 – April 2, 2019) was an Iranian actor. Mashayekhi, Ali Nasirian, Ezatollah Entezami, Mohammad Ali Keshavarz and Davoud Rashidi are known as "the five most important actors in the history of Iranian cinema" because of their influence.

== Career ==
Mashayekhi began professional acting on stage in 1957. His first feature film role was Brick and Mirror (1965, Ebrahim Golestan). After a four-year break, he acted in The Cow (1969, Darius Mehrjui) and Qeysar (1969, Masoud Kimiai). Mashayekhi commonly appeared as an elderly grandfather because of his white hair and charismatic face and figure. He received a best performance award for The Grandfather (1985, Majid Gharizadeh) from the First Festival of Non-aligned Countries in North Korea.

== Selected filmography ==
- Adobe and Mirror (1964)
- Kaiser (Qeysar, 1969)
- The Cow (Gaav, 1969)
- The Curse, 1973
- Prince Ehtedjab, 1974
- Brefts of Hope, 1977
- Hezar Dastan, (1978-1987, TV series)
- Kamalolmolk, 1983
- The Lead, 1988
- Honeymoon, 1992
- The Fateful Day, 1994
- Khane'i Rooy-e Āb (A House Built on Water), directed by Bahman Farmān'ārā, 2001
- Rising (Tolooa, 2001) directed by Hossein Shahabi
- Abadan, 2003
- Pol-e Sizdahom (The Thirteenth Bridge), directed by Farhad Gharib, 2005
- Yek Bus-e Kuchulu (A Teensy Kiss), directed by Bahman Farmān'ārā, 2005
- In Search of Peace directed by saeed soltani 2016-2017
