= The Cow (1969 film) =

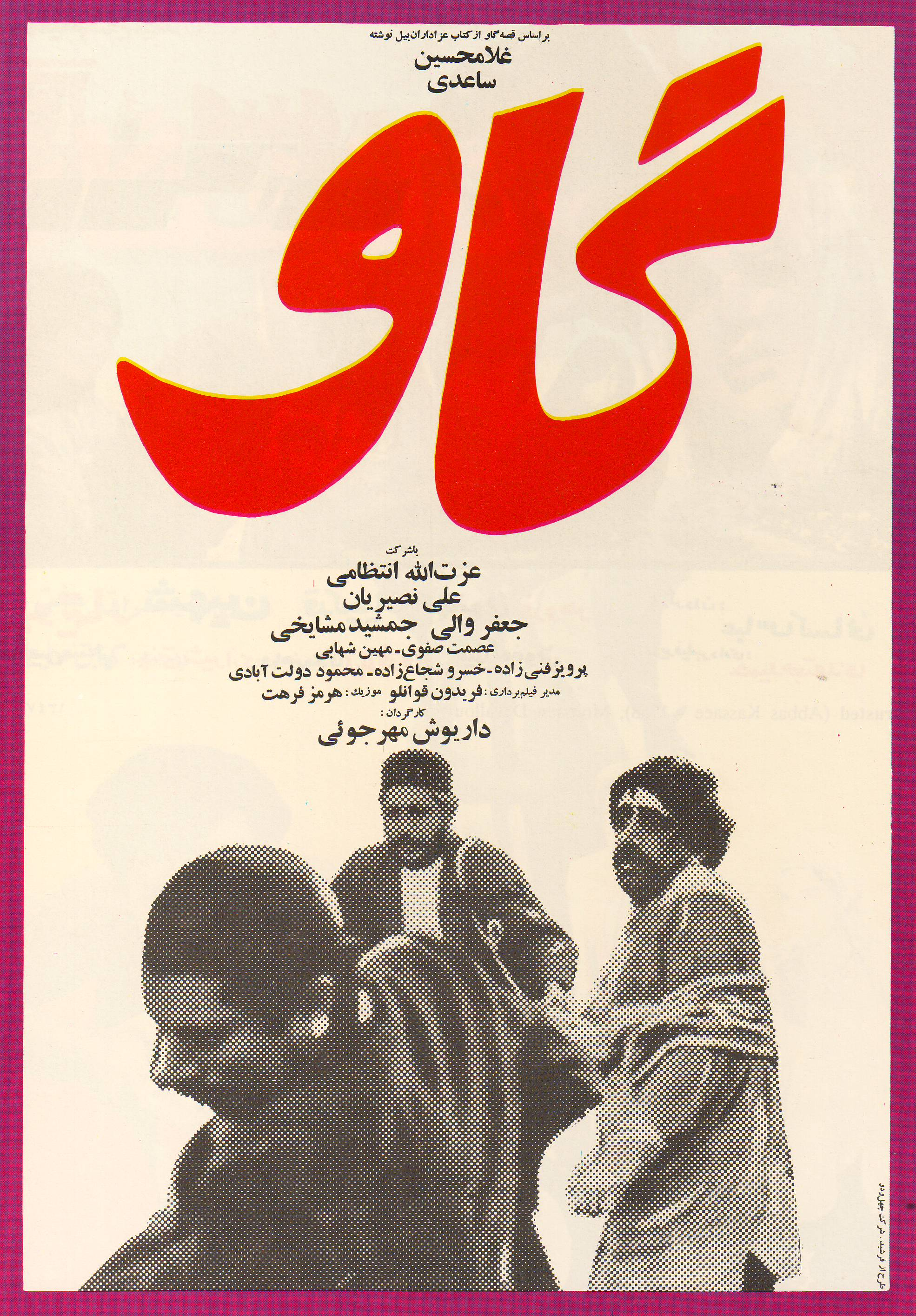
- Iranian theatrical release poster
- Directed by: Dariush Mehrjui
- Written by: Dariush Mehrjui; Gholam Hossein Saedi
- Produced by: Dariush Mehrjui
- Starring: Ezzatolah Entezami; Firouz Behjat-Mohamadi; Mahmoud Dowlatabadi; Parviz Fannizadeh; Jamshid Mashayekhi; Ali Nassirian; Ezatallah Ramezanifar; Esmat Safavi; Jafar Vali
- Cinematography: Fereydon Ghovanlou
- Music by: Hormoz Farhat
- Release date: 1969
- Running time: 105 minutes
- Country: Iran
- Language: Persian

The Cow (Persian: گاو, Gāv, Gaav, or Gav) is a 1969 Iranian film directed by Dariush Mehrjui, written by Gholam-Hossein Saedi based on his own short story, and starring Ezzatolah Entezami as Masht Hassan. Some critics consider it the first film of the Iranian New Wave.

== Plot ==
Full movie

The story begins by showcasing the close relationship between a middle-aged Iranian villager Masht Hassan and his beloved cow. Hassan is married but has no children. His only valuable property is a cow that he cherishes as the only cow in the village. When Hassan must leave the village for a short time, the pregnant cow is found dead in the barn. Hassan's fellow villagers fear his reaction and cover up the evidence of the death and tell him upon his return that his cow has run away. Finding great difficulty confronting the loss of his beloved cow, as well the loss of livestock that affects his social stature at the village, Hassan gradually goes insane following a nervous breakdown and believes he is the cow, adopting such mannerisms as eating hay. His wife and the villagers try in vain to restore his sanity.

== Analysis ==
The movie is very well-known because of its psychological and social criticisms. There are several psychological messages behind the main character’s delusion of being a cow. It opens up Marx's theory of alienation and social alienation and describes how the main character loses himself in the struggle of finding his cow which is his most valuable property. It reveals how much Masht Hassan and his family’s life is depended on the cow both economically and emotionally that Masht Hassan cannot handle the situation logically.

The movie depicts a very superstitious society in which people believe in an ultimate ultra-mundane power which will save them from the devil, the eternal enemy of humankind. The shadows of this illusion (enemy illusion) are to the extent that the people have a sense of paranoia and are always ready to confront the conspiracy of their enemies. In such a society, women have no significant role apart from being good wives and mothers who are expected to follow the social norm and be a typical Iranian woman.

== Cast ==
- Ezzatollah Entezami as Masht Hasan
- Mahin Shahabi as Masht Hasan's wife
- Ali Nassirian as Masht Eslam
- Jamshid Mashayekhi as Abbas
- Firouz Behjat-Mohamadi
- Jafar Vali as Kadkhoda (Village headman)
- Khosrow Shojazadeh as young man
- Ezzatollah Ramazanifar as madman
- Esmat Safavi as old woman
- Mahmoud Dowlatabadi as Esma'il
- Parviz Fannizadeh
- Mahtaj Nojoomi as Esma'il's sister

== Development ==
The Buyid prince Majd ad-Dawla was reported to have thought of himself as a cow. He was subsequently cured of his delusion by the medieval Persian physician Avicenna. It is possible that elements of the plot of The Cow were inspired by this.

Funded by the Shah of Iran, the film's director, Mehrjui, had been forced to whitewash the buildings of the village before shooting so they did not look so neglected.

== Reception ==
The Cow was immediately banned by the Shah because of its negative portrayal of impoverishment in rural Iran. It was later smuggled out of the country and won the FIPRESCI critics prize at the 1971 Venice Film Festival.

Iran's Ayatollah Khomeini was reported to have admired the film. This in turn was reported to have been the saving grace that allowed Iranian cinema to continue rather than being banned after the Iranian Revolution. Despite a massive commercial cinema - Filmfarsi - that was the economic backbone for Art House too, directors of New Wave of Iran cinema mostly from the 1960s and 1970s (the time cinema flourished) faced a massive censorship in the 1980s. However they continued their film-making and struggle around censorship but it was obvious cinema was going through a financial crisis and censorship had choked the cinema.

Indie Cinema wrote that the film "adds a mystical vision and surreal sequences" to the Italian neorealism by which it was inspired.

Reviewing the film as part of a 1998 retrospective of the director's work, the New York Times called it a "dazzling achievement" and "the most impressive of Mr. Mehrjui's pre-Revolutionary features".

== Awards ==
- Best Film Award La Rochelle 1994
- OCIC Award - Recommendation - Forum of New Film 22nd Berlin International Film Festival 1972
- FIPRESCI Prize 32nd Venice International Film Festival 1971
- Award for Best Screenplay Sepas Film Festival 1970
