= Ezzatolah Entezami =

Iranian actor (1924–2018)

Ezatollah Entezami
- عزت‌الله انتظامی
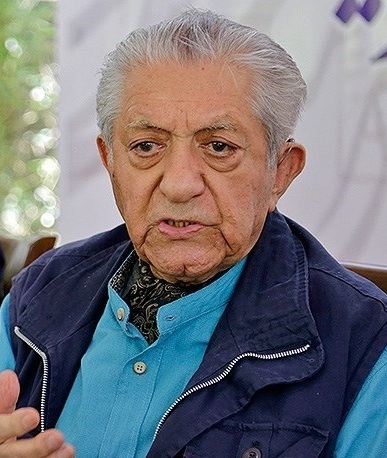
- Entezami in 2015
- Born: 21 June 1924; Tehran, Iran
- Died: 17 August 2018 (aged 94); Tehran, Iran
- Resting place: Artists Segment, Behesht-e Zahra Cemetery
- Education: University of Tehran
- Occupation: Actor
- Years active: 1949–2016
- Spouses: Mina Entezami (m. 1944; died 1960) Flora Roostaei (m. 1970)
- Children: 3, including Majid
- Parent(s): Niatollah Ebrahim Eshtehardi (father); Entezam Darbar (mother)

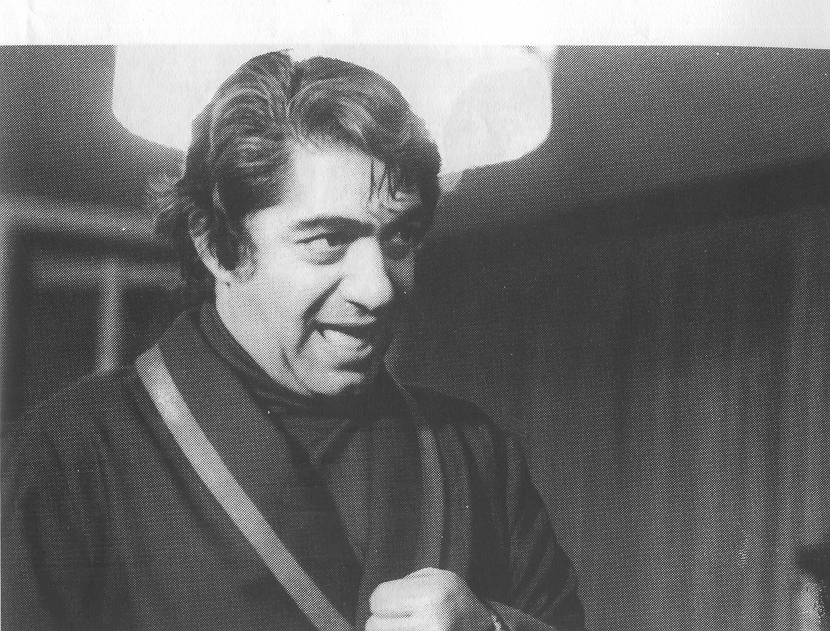
Entezami in The Cycle (Dayere-ye Mina), 1975

Ezzatollah Entezami, or Ezzatolah Entezami (Persian: عزت‌الله انتظامی; 21 June 1924 – 17 August 2018) was an Iranian actor.

== Career ==
Ezzatolah Entezami started his career on stage in 1941 and graduated from theatre and cinema school in Hanover, Germany in 1958. He has been acting in movies since 1969. His debut performance was in Darius Mehrjui’s film, The Cow. He shined in the role of a naive villager who cannot endure the death of his beloved cow and starts to believe that he is the cow himself.

Entezami was known as one of the most prominent actors in Iranian cinema and has been labeled as the greatest actor in the history of the cinema of Iran. He worked with most of the prominent Iranian film directors, including Darius Mehrjui (eight films), Ali Hatami (four films), Nasser Taqvaee, Mohsen Makhmalbaf, Behrouz Afkhami and Rakhshan Bani-Etemad. He was awarded the Crystal Simorgh for the Best Actor twice from the International Fajr Film Festival, for Grand Cinema and The Day of Angel. His work and accomplishments were recognized in October 2006 at the Iran cultural center in Paris.

Entezami, Ali Nasirian, Mohammad Ali Keshavarz, Jamshid Mashayekhi and Davoud Rashidi are known as "the five most important actors in the history of Iranian cinema" because of their influence.

== Personal life ==
His son, Majid Entezami is an Iranian film score composer.

== Filmography ==
- Vareite bahari (1949)
- The Cow (1969) - Masht Hassan
- Mr. Naive (1970) - Mohammadipoor / Fathollah Khan
- The Postman (1972) - Niyatollah
- Bita (1972) - Bita's father
- Sattar Khan (1972) - Heydar Khan Amoo-Ughli
- Sadegh the Kurdish (1972) - Sergeant Vali Khan
- Love’s Tumult (1973) - Kamal
- Kingdom of Heaven (1975)
- Sleeping Lion (1976)
- The Cycle (1976)
- The Dust Dwellers (1977) - Dr. Sameri
- In Grouhe Mahkoomin (1977) - Hossein General
- Condemned (1978)
- The School We Went To (1980)
- Hadji Washington (1982)
- Hajji Washington (1983) - Hajji Hossein-Gholi Noori
- The Spider’s House (1983)
- Kamalolmolk (1984) - Nasereddin Shah
- The Suitcase (1985, released in 1988)
- Jafar Khan Is Back from the West (1985)
- Stony Lion (1986)
- In the Wind’s Eye (1986)
- The Tenants (1987) - Abbas
- Shirak (1988) - Haj Khaloo
- Hezar Dastan (1988, TV Mini-Series) - Hezardastan
- The Ship Angelica (1989)
- Grand Cinema (1989) - Aghaiev
- Eye of the Hurricane (1989) - Amir Houshang
- Hamoun (1990) - Dabiri
- The Shadow of Imagination (1990)
- Saye khial (1991)
- Banu (1991, released in 1998)
- The Quiet Home (1991)
- Once Upon a Time, Cinema (1992) - Nassereddin Shah / Mozzaffaeddin Shah / Mash Hasan
- Baanoo (1992) - Ghorban Salar
- The Toy (1992, released in 1994) - Ghadir zafarlu
- The Battle of Oil Tankers (1993)
- Day of the Angel (1993, also-sc.) - Amir Jalaleddin
- Rooz-e fereshte (1994) - Niyyatollah
- Jang-e naftkesh-ha (1994)
- The Blue Veiled (1995)
- The Fateful Day (1995) - Rasul Rahmani
- Typhoon (1997)
- The Punishment Committee (1997) - Khan-e Mozaffar
- Wind and Anemone (1997)
- Takhti, the World Champion (1998, the first version, unfinished) - Takhti's father
- Tehran Rozegar-e No (1999) - Khan-e Mozaffar
- The Mix (2000) - (guest star)
- The Dark Room
- Twilight (2001) - Detective Alavi
- A House Built on Water (2002) - Dr. Sepidbakht's father
- Divanei az ghafas parid (2003) - Mostofi
- Jayi baraye zendegi (2003) - Eydi Mohammad
- A Place to Live (2003)
- Gav khuni (2003)
- Order (2004)
- Stars (2005)
- The Command (2005) - Reza Ma'roofi
- Setareh Mishavad (2006) - Rafi Golkar
- Colors of Memory (2008) - Ghanati
- Shab (2008) - Dr. Parviz
- Atash-e sabz (2008) - Judge
- Zadboom (2009) - Colonel Amiri
- Forty Years Old (2010) - Judge
- The Maritime Silk Road (2011), slave merchant (final film acting role)
- Gohar Kheirandish A Filmography (2015), as himself
