= Filmfarsi =

Film genre used in pre-revolutionary Iranian cinema

Filmfarsi (Persian: فیلم‌فارسی, literally Persian Film), is a term used in Pre-revolutionary Iranian cinema criticism that was coined by Iranian film critic Amir Hushang Kavusi. The term is used to describe what was perceived as low-quality films mostly copied from the Bollywood cinema and with poor plots, mostly arranged with dance and singing. Filmfarsi were suppressed after the Iranian Cultural Revolution by more strict laws on relations between men and women, as well as religious opposition to the content of the films. The suppression of the Filmfarsi genre encouraged the Iranian New Wave of modern films in Iranian cinema. Many of the Filmfarsi that survived the Iranian revolution did so thanks to the existence of illegal VHS copies.

== Description ==
According to BBC's Yousef Latifpour (یوسف لطیف پور), the plots of many Filmfarsi are based on "incredible accidents" or "exaggerated misunderstandings", where conflicts between tradition and modernism usually end "in favor of tradition". Within Filmfarsi, there existed unique genres of film such as "Jāheli" (جاهلی), described by some as "hyper-masculine", in which tough male characters would save women from "a life of disgrace", such as working as a prostitute or cabaret singer. Other common genres of Iranian film prior to the Islamic Revolution included thrillers, melodramas, musicals and action movies. While the films varied in theme, many of them shared common traits such as a "low production value" and "one-dimensional archetypes".

== Decline ==
The 1978 Cinema Rex fire is often seen as the catalyst for the demise of Filmfarsi; approximately 400 civilians were killed by four Islamic revolutionaries while attending a screening of the controversial movie "The Deer". After Iran became an Islamic Republic in 1979, many commonly seen features of Filmfarsi, such as women acting as an object of "sexual desire" or not wearing a hijab, were now frowned upon, and the genre was actively suppressed.

== Gallery ==
Lady Shabaji (1958)

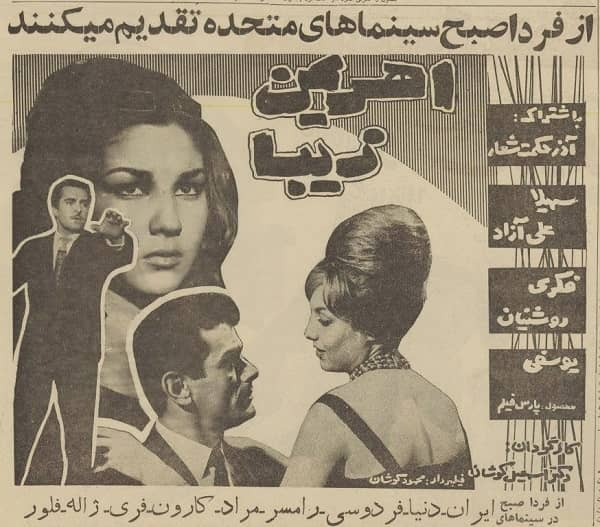
Pretty Foe (1962)

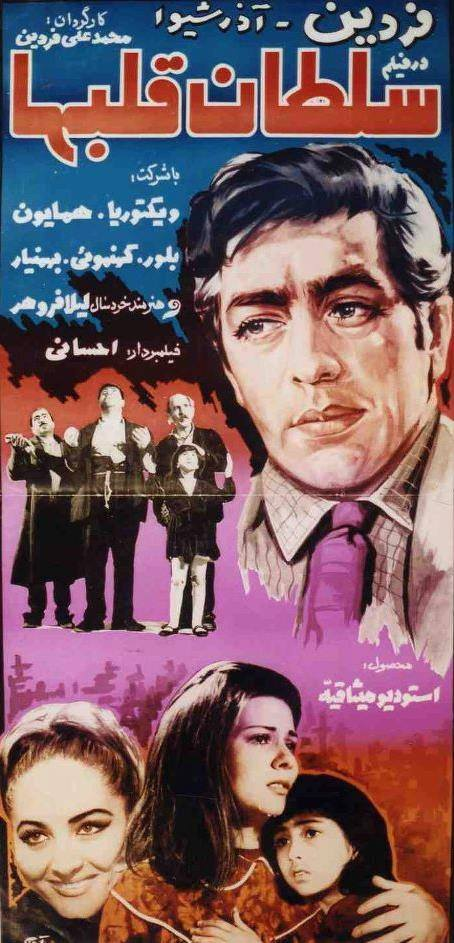
King of Hearts (1968)

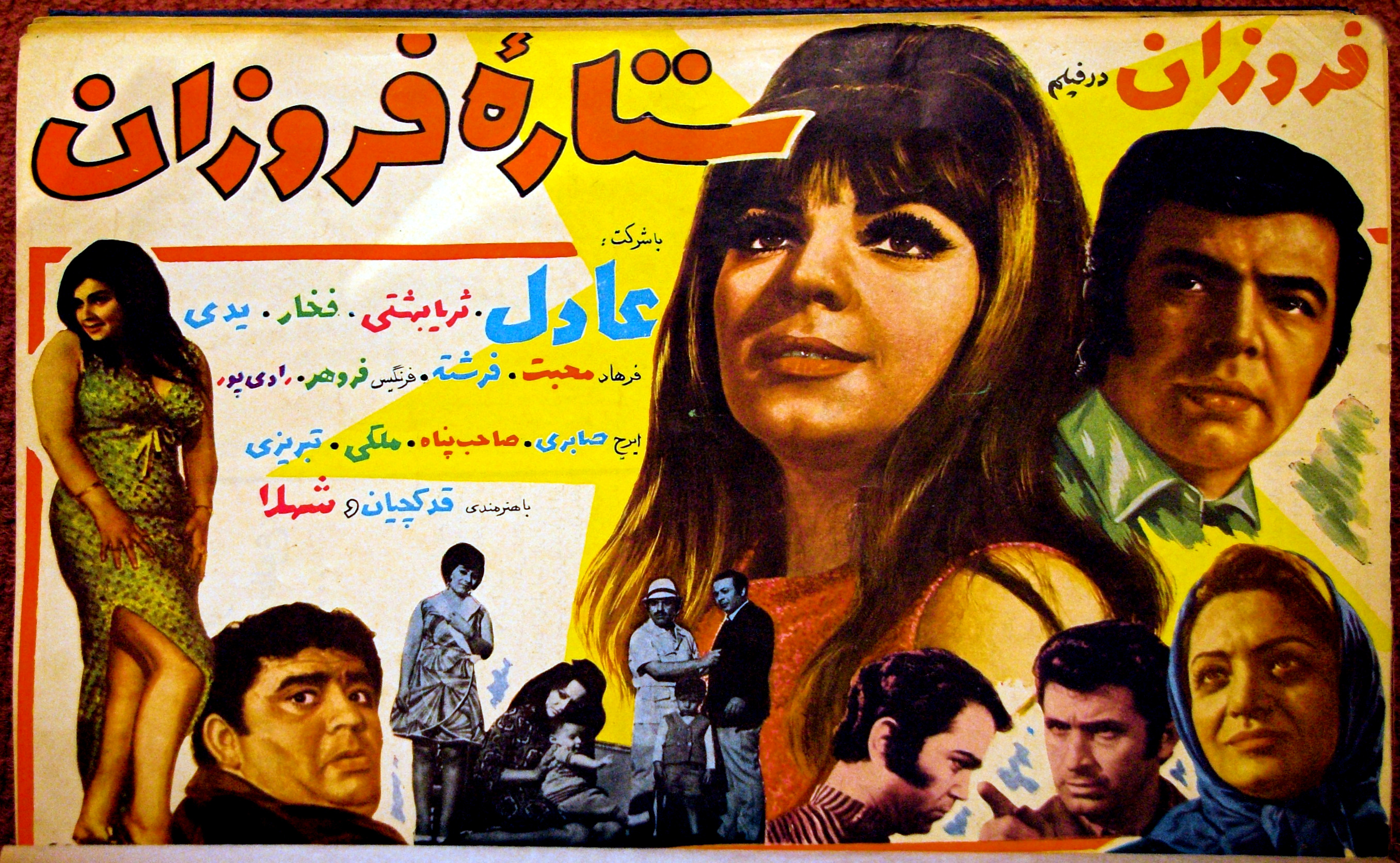
Shining Star (1969)

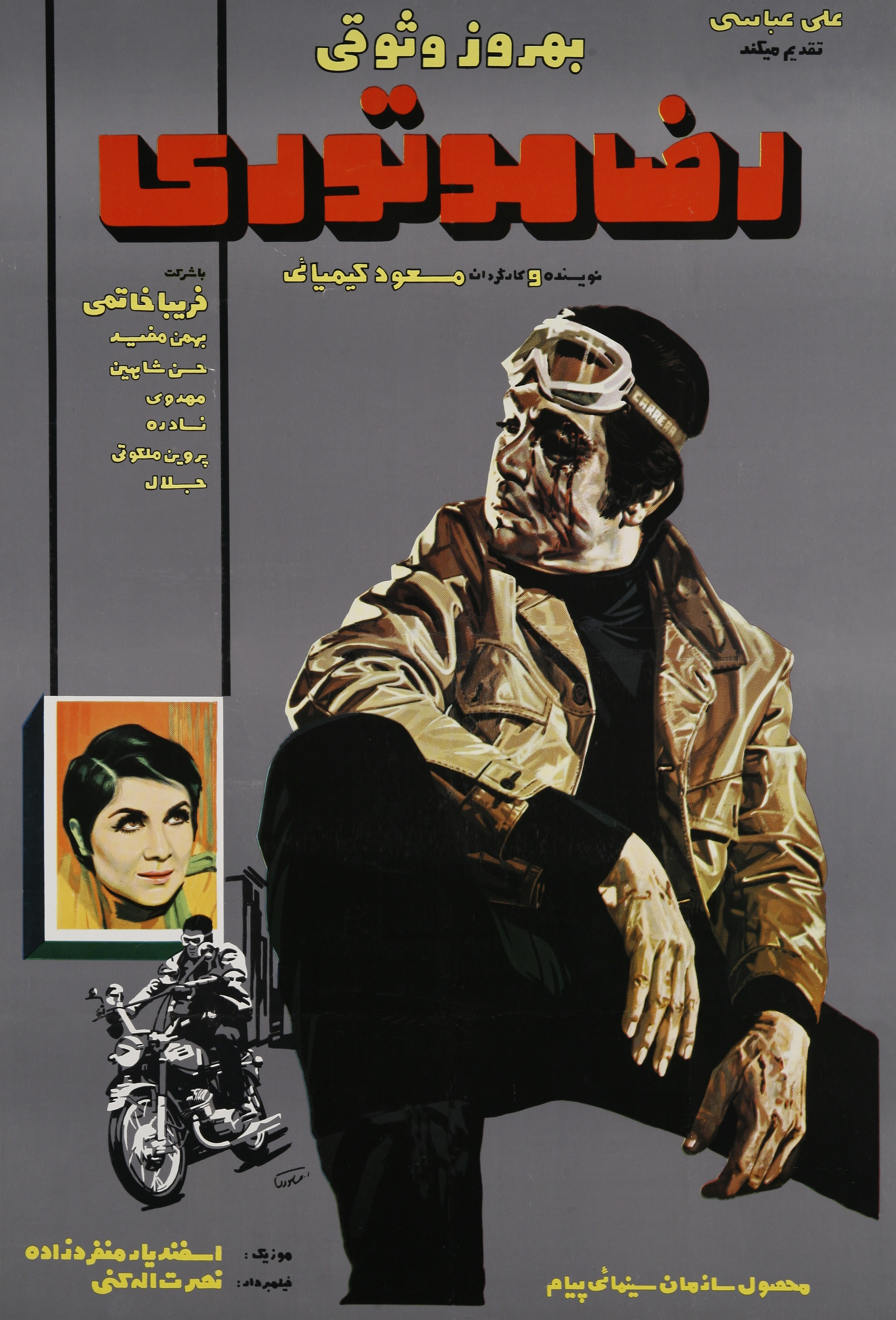
Reza Motorcyclist (1970)

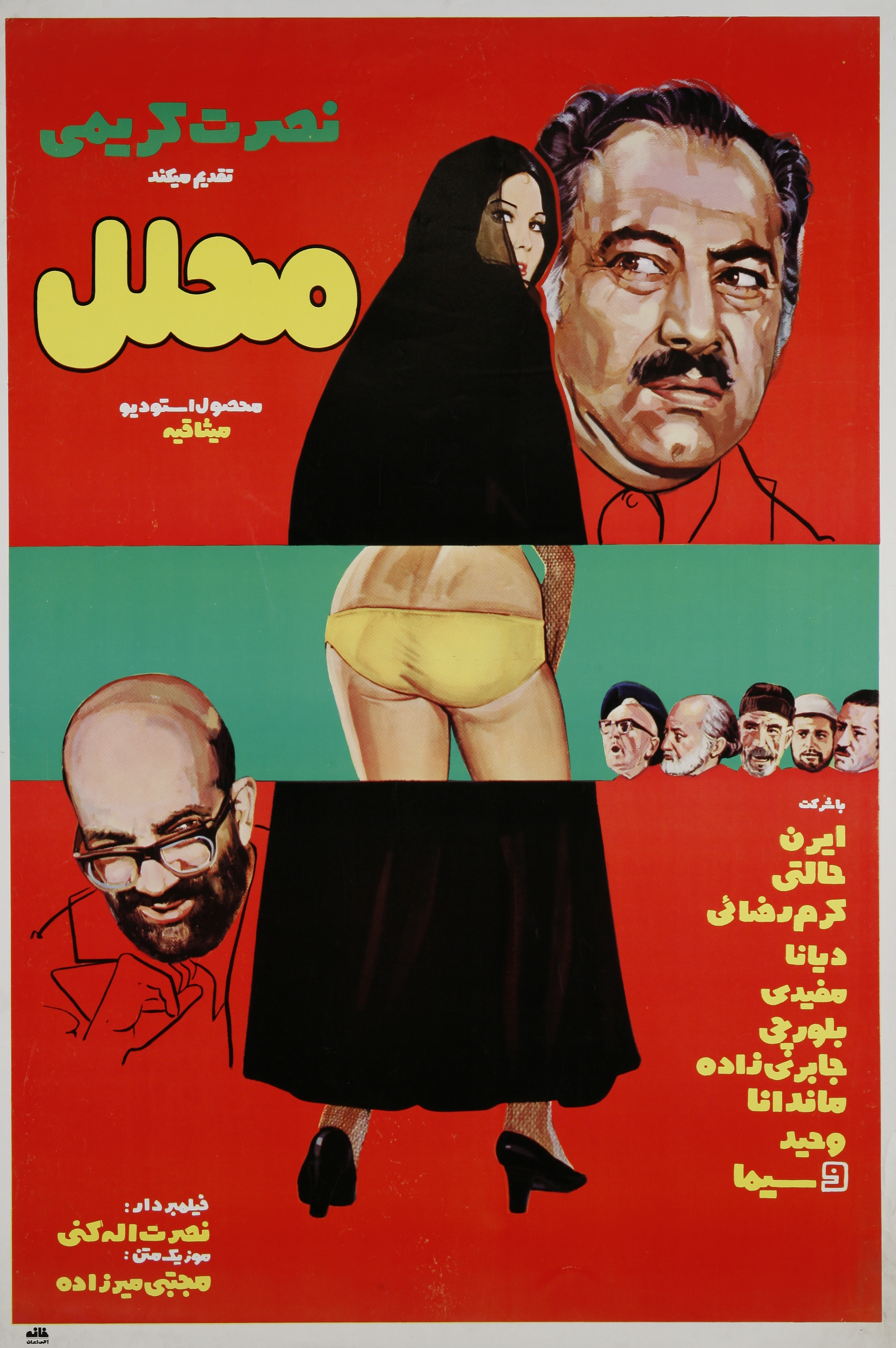
Nikah Halala (1971)

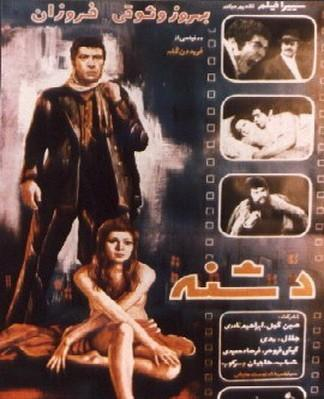
The Dagger (1972)

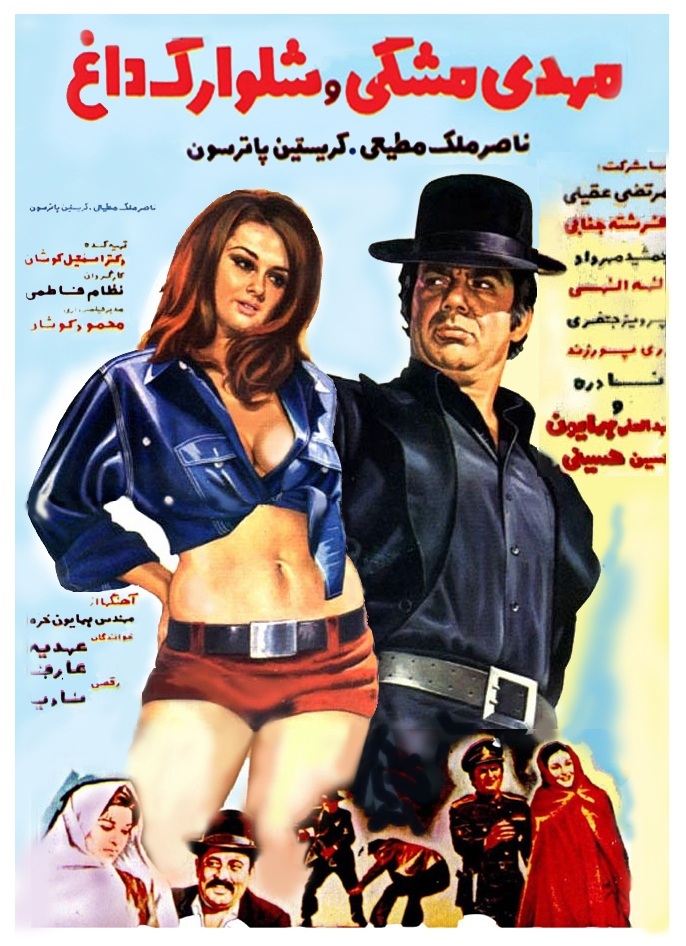
Mehdi in Black and Hot Mini Pants (1972)

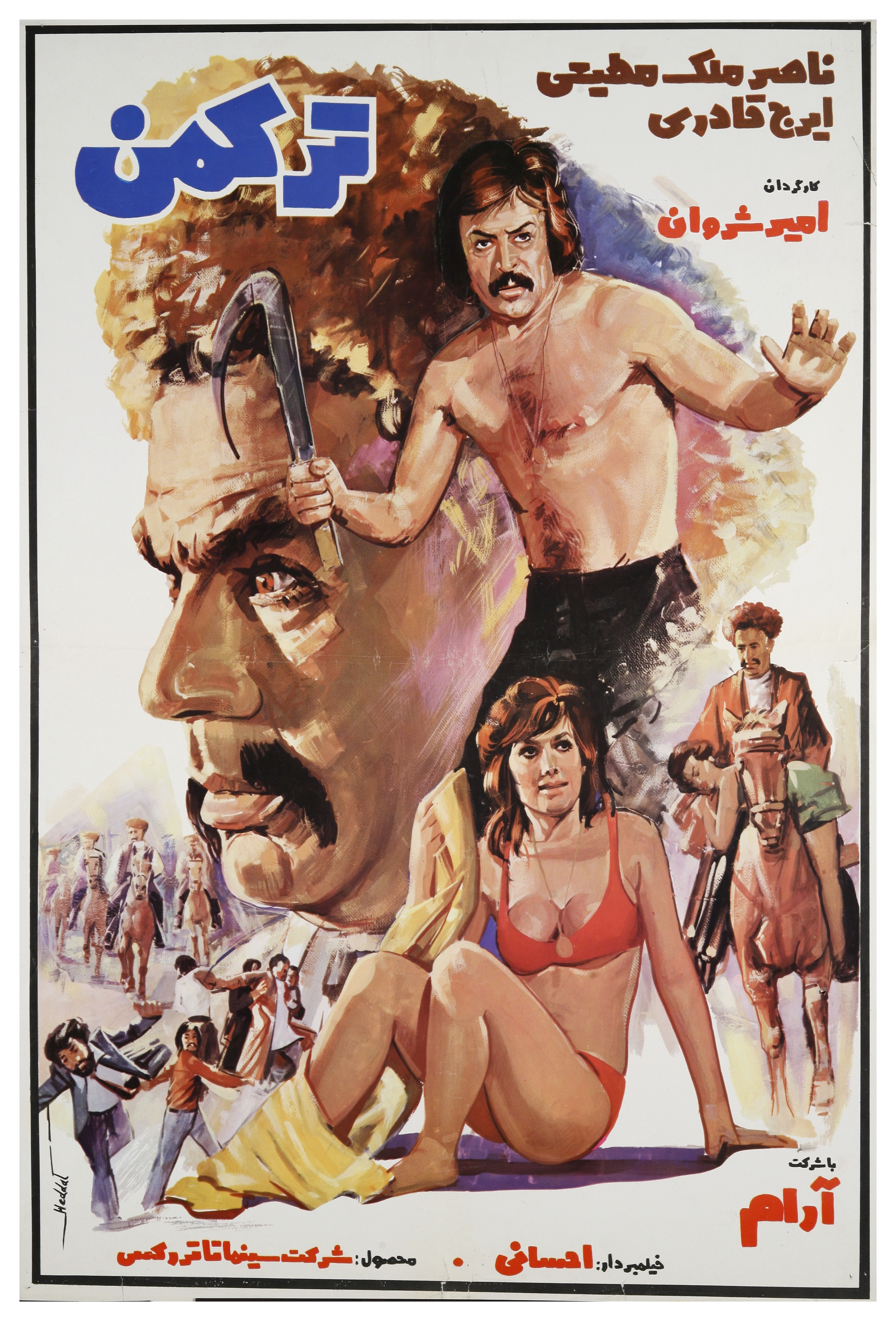
Torkaman (1974)

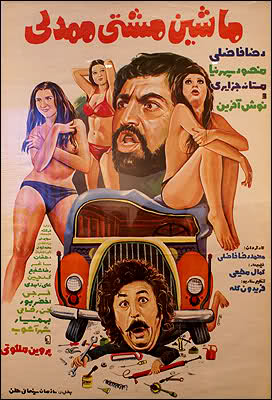
Mashti Mamdali's Car (1974)

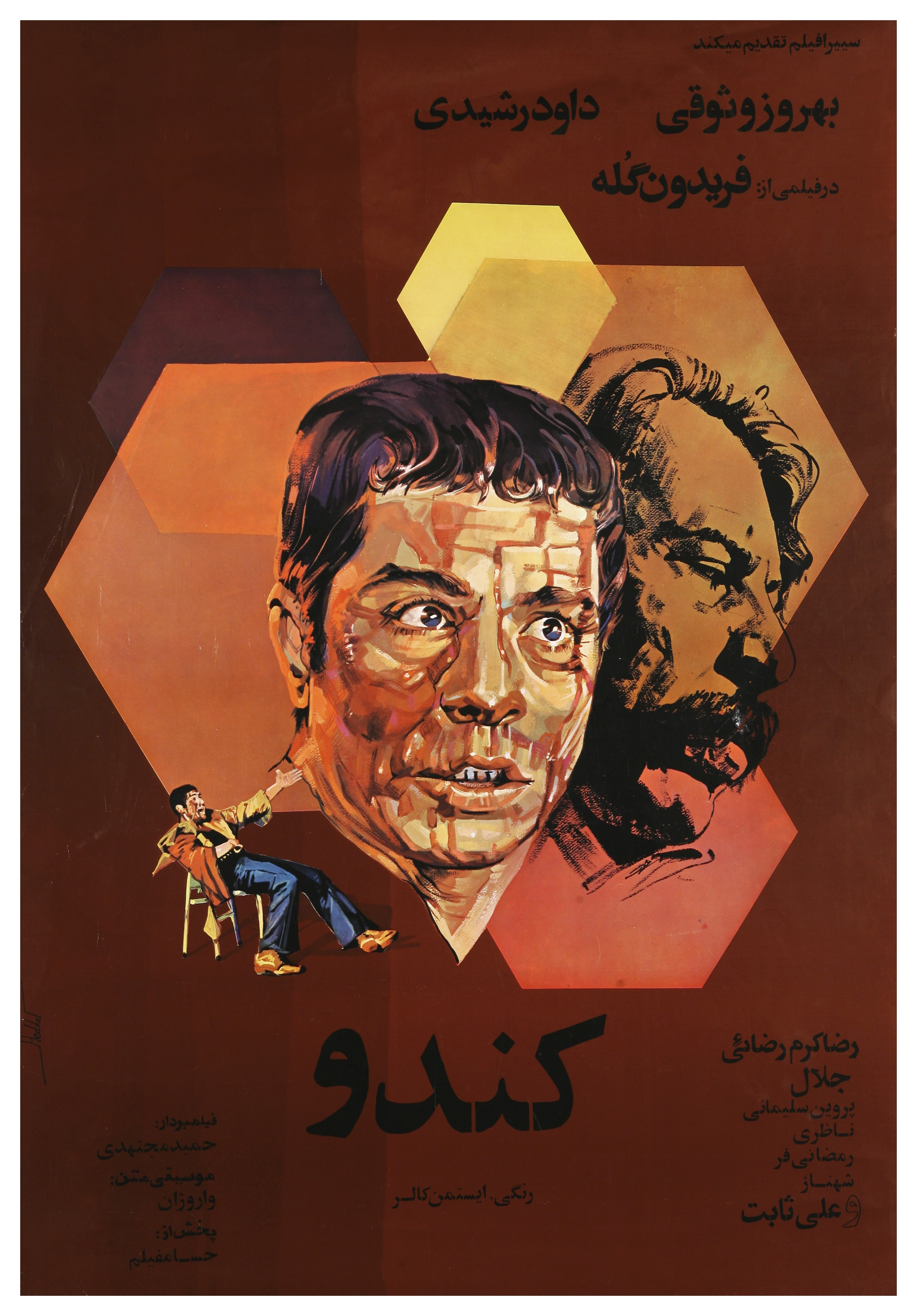
The Beehive (1975)

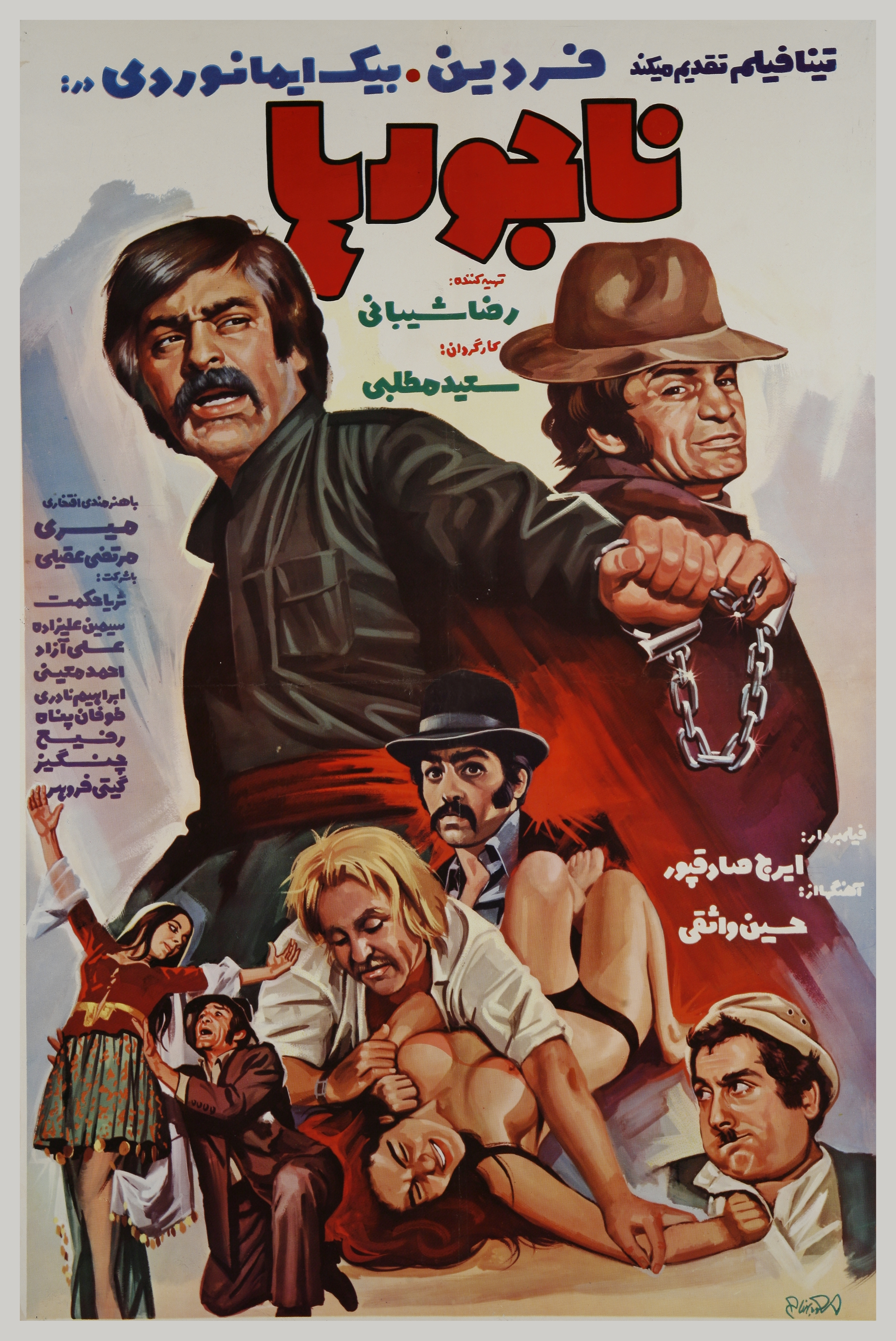
The Crookes (1974)
