= Soltane Ghalbha =

Soltan-e Ghalbha
- Theatrical poster
- Directed by: Mohammad Ali Fardin
- Written by: Mohammad Ali Fardin; Habibolah Kasmaei
- Produced by: Mehdi Misaghieh
- Starring: Mohammad Ali Fardin; Azar Shiva; Leila Forouhar; Homayun; Mohammd Ali Tabrizain; Victoria Nerssisian; Habibolah Bolour; Jamshid Mehrdad; Niktaj Sabri; Gholam Hossein Bahmanyar; Mohammad Taghi Kahnamoui; Yasamin Reza Abdi Tehrani
- Cinematography: Ghodratollah Ehsani
- Edited by: Ghodratollah Ehsani
- Music by: Rubik Mansouri, Anoushiravan Rohani (composer); Aref Arefkia (singer)
- Production company: Misaghieh
- Release date: 1968
- Running time: 137 min
- Country: Iran
- Language: Persian

Soltane Ghalbha (Persian: سلطان قلب‌ها; literally: King of Hearts) is a 1968 melodrama Iranian film directed by Mohammad Ali Fardin and starring Azar Shiva, Victoria Nerssisian, Leila Forouhar and Mohammad Ali Fardin. Aref Arefkia and Ahdieh did the singing voices of the film and dubbed the lead performers. The film's songs and lyrics were composed by pianist Anoushiravan Rohani.

== Plot ==
A young couple lives apart for years during an accident, each assuming that their spouse has died. The man becomes a famous singer and the woman loses her sight in an accident. Years later, the man happens to meet a girl and, without knowing what the girl has to do with him, treats the girl's mother and his wife. The man intends to marry a wealthy woman, but on the wedding night, the wife and child come to thank him, and thus the old couple find each other again after a long time and start a new life together.

== Cast ==
- Mohammad Ali Fardin
- Azar Shiva
- Leila Forouhar
- Homayun
- Victoria
- Habibollah Bolur
- Jamhsid Mehrdad
- Niktaj Sabri

== Soundtrack ==
- Soltane Ghalbha (Aref)
