= Taghi Zohouri =

Iranian actor (1912–1991)

Taghi Zohouri تقی ظهوری
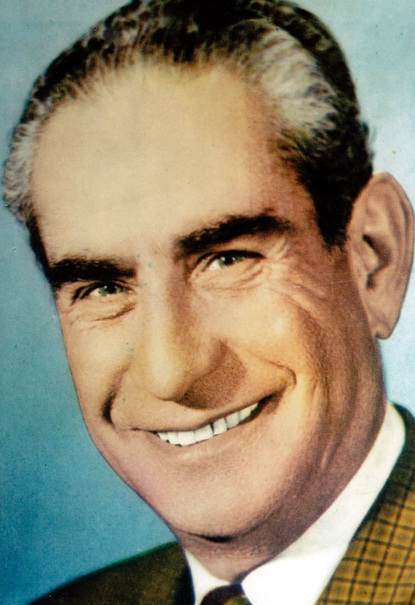
- Born: 20 January 1912; Tehran, Sublime State of Iran
- Died: 28 February 1991 (aged 79); Tehran, Iran
- Years active: 1930–1990

Taghi Zohouri (Persian: تقی ظهوری; 20 January 1912 – 28 February 1991) was an Iranian film and stage actor and comedian.

== Life ==
Taghi Zohouri was a graduate of the first course of the Tehran High School of Acting. He worked in Tehran cinema from 1936 until 1977.
