= Mohammad Ali Fardin =

Iranian actor

- محمدعلی فردین
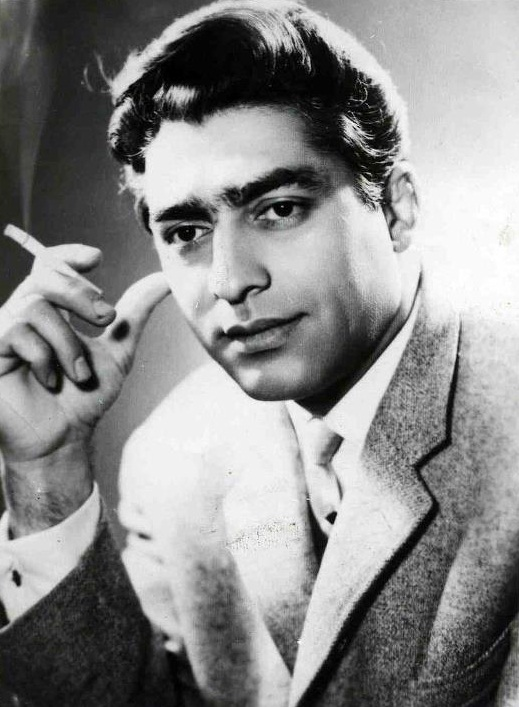
- Fardin in 1961
- Born: Mohammad-Ali Fardin; 4 February 1931; Tehran, Imperial State of Iran
- Died: 6 April 2000 (aged 69); Tehran, Iran
- Resting place: Number 10 Grave, Artists Segment, Behesht-e Zahra Cemetery
- Years active: 1959–1983
- Height: 1.77 m (5 ft 9 1/2 in)
- Spouse: Mehri Khomaarloo
- Children: 4

Mohammad Ali Fardin
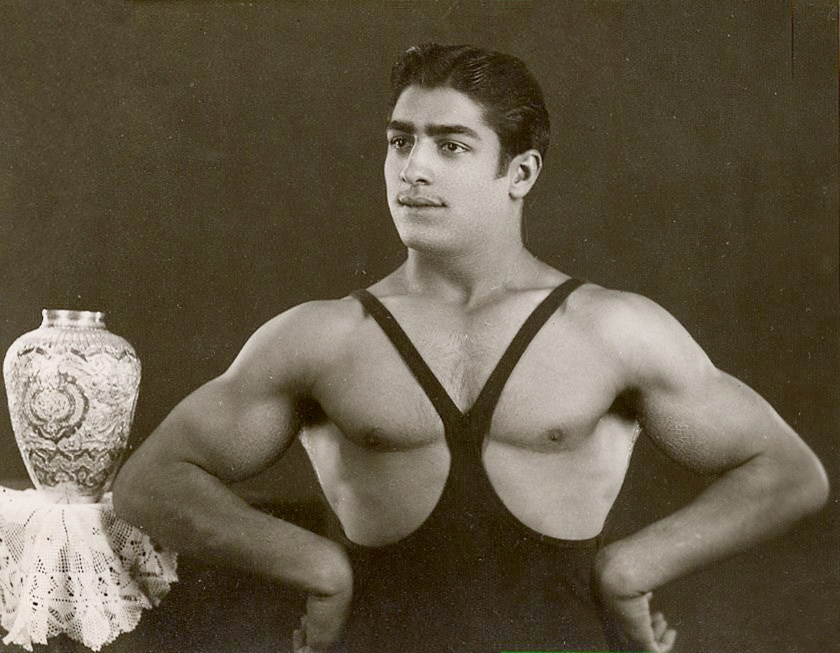

Sport
- Sport: Freestyle wrestling
Medal record
Representing Iran
World Championships
Silver medal – second place	1954 Tokyo	-73 kg

Mohammad Ali Fardin (Persian: محمدعلی فردین; 4 February 1931 – 6 April 2000) was a prominent Iranian actor, film director and freestyle wrestler and was the runner-up in world wrestling. He started his film career in the late 1950s and was a big star of Iranian cinema for two decades from the 1960s onwards. He was also active in wrestling and won a silver medal in the 1954 World Championship.

Fardin was mostly famous for portraying masculinity and chivalry in Persian films. The undisputed box office champion of the era, Fardin captivated millions of viewers in his 25-year career. Between 1961 and 1976, he acted in the most popular movies of the year in Iranian cinema. He then started his first professional appearance in the cinema with the invitation of Ismail Kushan by playing a role in Cheshme Ab Hayat (1959). Soltane Ghalbha, Alley of Men, Ganj-e Qarun, Midnight Cry, Mr. 20th Century, The Secret of the Elder Tree, The Waiting Beach, Baba Shamal, The Rendezvous of Khashm, The Crookes (film), Ayyub, Barzakhi, Hell + Me, and Jabar the corporal escapes are some of his prominent films. Fardin's popularity as an actor is mainly due to the characters he has portrayed in his films.

== Biography ==
=== Early life ===
Fardin was born and raised in a poor area in southern Tehran. He was the eldest of three children. After graduating from high school, Fardin joined the Air Force and became a freestyle wrestler in his twenties; he won a silver medal at the 1954 World Wrestling Championships and placed fourth in 1957.

=== Acting ===
Fardin was a popular lead actor in Iranian cinema, and was known by the title, King of Hearts, after his lead role in an Iranian film of the same title (Soltane Ghalbha).

He rose to fame in the 1960s. For the average Iranian, he was a heroic figure who served as an alternative to non Iranian movie stars. He was stereotypically cast as the poor tough guy with the heart of gold who got the girl at the end. His films include, Behesht Door Nist, Ghazal, and Ganje Qarun. After the 1979 Iranian Revolution, he starred in only two more films, Bar Faraz-e Aseman-ha and Barzakhi-ha.

He also acted in the Indo Iranian Bollywood film Subah O Sham (1972) starring alongside Waheeda Rehman, Sanjeev Kapoor, Simin Ghaffari and Azar. The film was directed by Tapi Chanakya. His voice in the film was dubbed by Satyen Kappu.

=== Post-Revolutionary Limitations ===
Fardin was banned from working for almost the entire time that he lived through the post-revolutionary period. He could only act in one film, The Imperilled (Barzakhi-ha), which was released in 1982 and resulted in his life-time ban. The Imperilled was directed by Iraj Ghaderi and had four pre-revolutionary male stars in the lead roles. With its patriotic story about resisting foreign invasion, it was a chance for Fardin, Malek-Motiei, Ghaderi and Rad to renew their threatened careers as actors in the post-revolutionary atmosphere. The film was a hit and became the highest grossing Iranian film of all time in its short period of screening in theaters. But it was soon banned and consequently the four actors were banned from working. Saeed Motalebi, an established writer and director in the pre-revolutionary era, was the writer of the film. He is one of the people who has repeatedly recounted stories about how the film and the actors were banned. About how the film's success was turned into disaster Motalebi says:

In one friday Mr. Mohsen Makhmalbaf gathered a couple of people and they started collecting signatures for a petition which was written on a scroll, stating that "We have made a revolution while these actors are transgressors." They did it right in front of that theater in the Revolution Square near the university of Tehran. They said "Look how theaters are crowded while friday events are deserted." That's how they stopped my film. Then a reporter who was queued to ask something about our film, went and told the then prime minister (Mir-Hossein Mousavi) "There is a film in theaters whose writer wants to convey that people who are fighting in the fronts are problematic persons." The prime minister replied "These are leftovers of junk intellectuals who will soon go to the dustbin of history." Malek-Motiei became jobless and turned his garage into a pastry shop. Ghaderi put some rice bags in his office and became a rice dealer. Fardin opened a pastry shop too and when I went to visit him, I used to wait outside as long as there were no customers so that he wouldn't feel ashamed when he saw me. These were all caused by those illogical efforts which I will never forgive.

=== Death ===
Fardin died as a result of cardiac arrest on 6 April 2000 at the age of 69. He was buried in the Behesht-e Zahra cemetery in Tehran. More than 20,000 mourners attended his funeral.

== Filmography ==
Director

1. 1962 : Hungry Wolves (Gorg-haye Gorosneh)
2. 1965 : Love and Revenge (Eshgh-o Entegham)
3. 1965 : The Prettiest of All (Khoshgel-e Khoshgela)
4. 1966 : The Beggars of Tehran (Gedayan-e Tehran)
5. 1966 : The Most Bounteous (Hatam-e Tahei)
6. 1968 : King of the Hearts (Solatan-e Ghalb-ha)
7. 1969 : The Golden Castle (Ghasr-e Zarrin)
8. 1972 : Hell + Me (Jahannam + Man)
9. 1973 : Story of the Night (Ghesse-ye Shab)
10. 1975 : The Great Promise (Gharar-e Bozorg)
11. 1978 : Over the Clouds (Bar Faraz-e Aseman-ha)

Producer

1. Gorg-haye Gorosne (1962)
2. Khoshgel-e Khoshgela (1965)
3. Sekke-ye Shans (1970)
4. Jahanam + Man (1972)
5. Ghesse-ye Shab (1973)
6. Gharar Bozorg (1975)
7. Bar Faraz-e Aseman-ha (1978)

Writer

1. Eshgh-o Entegham (1965)
2. Khoshgel-e Khoshgela (1965)
3. Hatam-e Tahei (1966)
4. Solatan-e Ghalb-ha (1968)
5. Ghesse-ye Shab (1973)

Actor

1. Cheshme-ye Ab-e Hayat (1960)
2. Farda Roshan Ast (1960)
3. Faryad-e Nime Shab (1961) - Amir
4. Bive-haye Khandan (1961)
5. Dokhtari Faryad Mikeshad (1962)
6. Tala-ye Sefid (1962)
7. Gorg-haye Gorosne (1962)
8. Zamin-e Talkh (1962)
9. Zan-ha Fereshte-and (1963)
10. Sahel-e Entezar (1963) - Ahmad
11. Agha-ye Gharn-e Bistom (1964) - Dash Habib
12. Masir-e Roodkhaneh (1964) - Mahmood
13. Ensan-ha (1964) - Amir
14. Tarane-haye Roostaei (1964)
15. Jahanam Zir-e Pa-ye Man (1964) - Yargholi
16. Dehkade-ye Talaei (1965)
17. Ghahraman-e Gharamanan (1965) - Hassan Ferfere
18. Babr-e Koohestan (1965) - Majid
19. Eshgh-o Entegham (1965)
20. Khoshgel-e Khoshgela (1965)
21. Ganj-e Gharoon (1965) - Ali bigham
22. Moo Tatalei-e Shahre Ma (1965)
23. Hatam-e Taei (1966) - Jalal
24. AmirArsalan-e Namdar (1966) - Amir Arsalan
25. Mardi az Tehran (1966)
26. Gadayan-e Tehran (1966)
27. Jahan Pahlavan (1966)
28. Wadi al mot (1967)
29. Toofan-e Nooh (1967)
30. Charkh-e Falak (1967) - Mamal Feshfesheh
31. Toofan Bar Faraz-e Patra (1968)
32. Ed ora... raccomanda l'anima a Dio! (1968) - Stanley Maserick
33. Soltan-e Ghalb-ha (1968) - Saeed
34. Shokooh-e Javanmardi (1968)
35. Khashm-e Kowli (1968)
36. Mardan-e Bokos (1968)
37. Na’re Toofan (1969) - Toofan
38. Donya-ye Por Omid (1969)
39. Ghasr-e Zarrin (1969) - The Youngest Son
40. Donya-ye poromid (1969)
41. Behesht Door Nist (1969)
42. Sekke-ye Shans (1970)
43. Yaghoot-e Se Cheshm (1970)
44. Mardi az Jonoob-e Shahr (1970) - Hadi
45. Kooche Mard-ha (1970) - Ali
46. Ayoob (1971) - Ayyoob
47. Yek Khoshkel va Hezar Moshkel (1971)
48. Mard-e Hezar Labkhand (1971)
49. Baba Shamal (1971) - Baba Shamal
50. Mi’adGah-e Khashm (1971) - Ghadam
51. Mardan-e Khashen (1971) - Nasir
52. Homa-ye Sa’adat (1971) - Aram
53. Raze Derakhte Senjed (1971)
54. Jahanam + Man (1972)
55. Subah-O-Shaam (Persian: همای سعادت) is a 1972 Indo-Iranian film
56. Jabbar, Sarjookhe Farari (1973)
57. Ghesse-ye Shab (1973) - Mohsen
58. Shekast Napazir (1974) - Akbar
59. Salam bar Eshgh (1974)
60. Najoor-ha (1974)
61. Javanmard (1974)
62. Movazebe Kolat Bash (1975) - Farhad
63. Ta’asob (1975)
64. Gharar-e Bozorg (1975) - Amir
65. Ghazal (1976) - Hojjat
66. Bar Faraz-e Aseman-ha (1978) - Ramin / Shahin
67. Barzakhi-ha (1982) - Seyyed Yaqub (final film role)

== Sources ==
- Akrami, Jamsheed (2009). "FARDIN, Moḥammad ʿAli". Encyclopaedia Iranica.
