= Farrokh Ghaffari =

Iranian director and actor (1922–2006)

- فرخ غفاری
- Born: محمدابراهیم فرخ غفاری; Mohammad-Ebrahim Farrokh Ghaffari; 26 February 1922; Tehran, Iran
- Died: 17 December 2006 (aged 84); Paris, France
- Occupations: Director, film critic, author, actor
- Years active: 1958–1980
- Notable work: Shabe Quzi; The Falconet
- Spouse: Mahshid Amirshahi

Farrokh Ghaffari (Persian: فرخ غفاری, 26 February 1922 – 17 December 2006) was an Iranian film director, actor, critic and author. Along with Ebrahim Golestan and Fereydoun Rahnema he was one of the founders of Iran's New Wave film movement. By establishing the first National Iranian Film Society in 1949 at the Iran Bastan Museum and organizing the first Film Week during which English films were exhibited, Ghaffari laid the foundation for alternative and non-commercial films in Iran.

== Early life ==
Ghaffari was born in Tehran, but was educated in Belgium and at the University of Grenoble in France.

In 1958, Ghaffari made one of the first neorealist films in Iranian cinema, Jonoub-e Shahr (South of the City). Because of its depictions of working class poverty the film was banned by the Shah's government, who feared the Soviet Union would use it as a propaganda tool to show the distressed economic condition of Iran's lower classes. In 1963, a heavily edited version of the film entitled Reghabat Dar Shahr (Urban Rivalry) was finally released. In 1964, he produced and directed his next film Shab-e Quzi (Night of the Hunchback). Based on One Thousand and One Nights, the film was originally set during the time of Caliph Harun al-Rashid but was changed to contemporary times because of censor objections. Shab-e Quzi is a black comedy about smugglers who try to hide the body of a dead hunchback who is left on their doorstep. The film starred Ghaffari and Mohammad-Ali Keshavarz in his film debut. Ghaffari worked for National Iranian Television during this time. In 1975, Ghaffari released his final film Zanbourak (The Running Canon) starring Parviz Sayyad and Shahnaz Tehrani. In 1979 with the onslaught of the Iranian Revolution, Ghaffari moved to Paris, where he worked as a film critic for the magazine Positif. He lived in exile in Paris until his death in 2006.

== Filmography ==
=== Feature films ===
- 1958: Jonoub-e Shahr (South of the City)
- 1960 ArusKodumeh? (Who is the Bride?)
- 1965: Shabe Quzi (Night of the Hunchback)
- 1975: Zanbourak (The Running Canon)
- Mard-e Kerayei (Rent Man) (unfinished)

=== Documentaries ===
- Siman-eTehran Norouzeman (Our New Year)
- Daryaye Pars (Persian Gulf)
- Zendegi Naft (Oil and Life)
- Vezarat Sanaye Va Maaden (Ministry of Industry and Mines)
