= The Falconet =

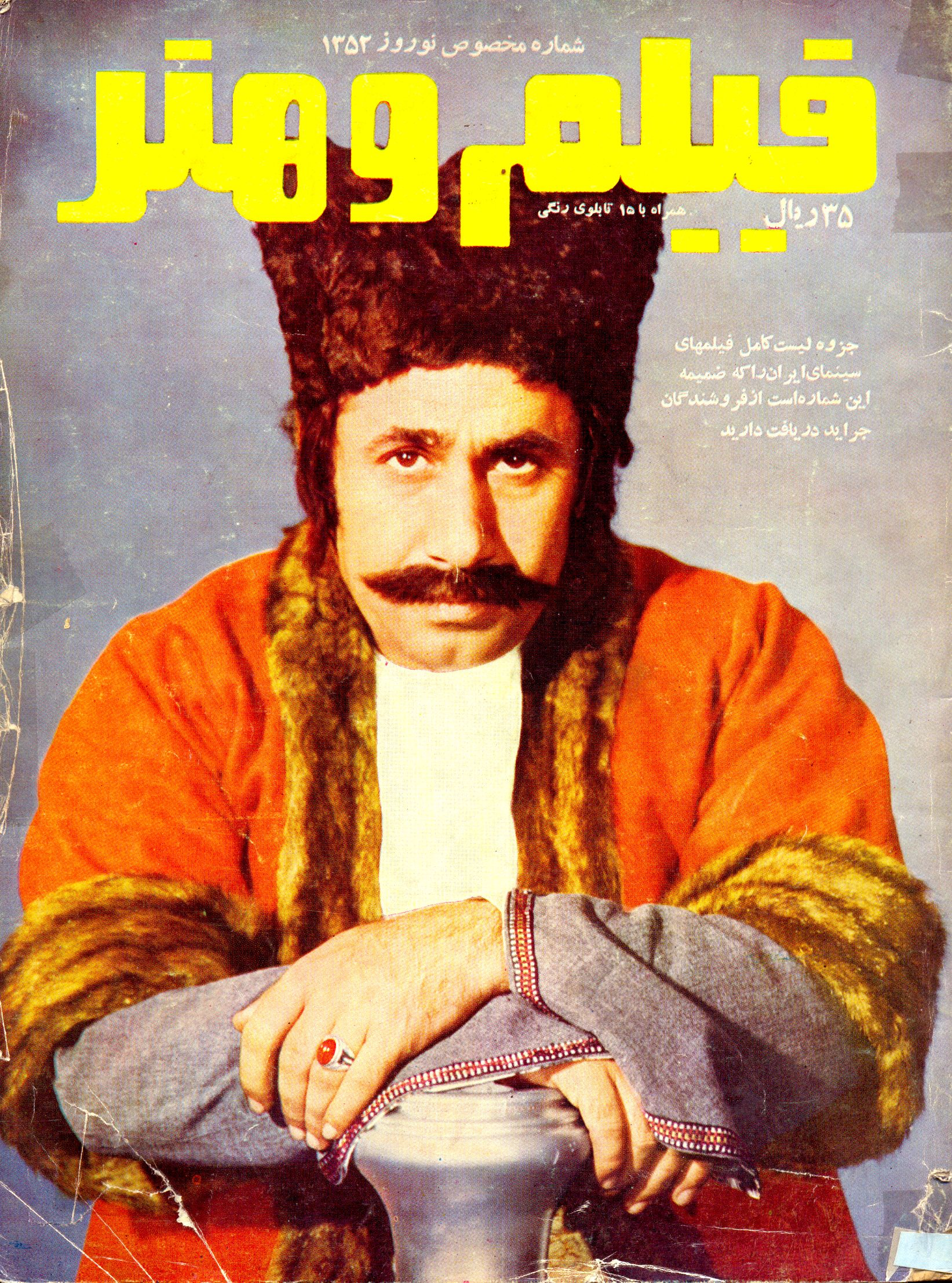
- Film va Honar magazine cover, Issue 426
- زنبورک
- Directed by: Farrokh Ghaffari
- Screenplay by: Parviz Sayyad; Kamran Nozad; Leili Matin Daftari
- Produced by: Parviz Sayyad
- Starring: Parviz Sayyad; Nozar Azadi; Pouri Banayi; Jahangir Foruhar; Shahnaz Tehrani; Enayat Bakhshi; Bahman Zarrinpour; Mahmoud Bahrami; Mohammad Bagher Sahrarudi
- Cinematography: Hushang Baharlou
- Edited by: Hadi Saber
- Music by: Fereydoun Naseri
- Production companies: Tel Film, Azad Film Group
- Release date: 1975
- Running time: 103 minutes
- Country: Iran
- Language: Persian

The Falconet (in Persian: زنبورک; pronounced: Zænbũræk) is a 1975 Iranian film directed by Farrokh Ghaffari. It stars Parviz Sayyad, Nozar Azadi, Pouri Banayi, Jahangir Forouhar, Enayat Bakhshi, and Shahnaz Tehrani.

== Cast ==
- Parviz Sayyad
- Pouri Banayi
- Nozar Azadi
- Enayat Bakhshi
- Jahangir Forouhar
- Sadegh Bahrami
- Mahmoud Bahrami
- Bahman Zarrinpour
- Hosein Amirfazli
- Bagher Sahrarudi
