= Fakhri Khorvash =

Iranian actress (1929–2023)

- فخری خوروش
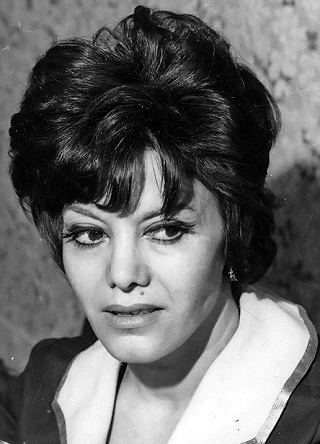
- Khorvash in 1970
- Born: Fakhri Asoudi; 31 May 1929; Kermanshah, Imperial State of Iran
- Died: 10 June 2023 (aged 94); Los Angeles, California
- Occupation: Actress
- Years active: 1948–2005

Fakhri Khorvash (Persian: فخری خوروش; 31 May 1929 – 10 June 2023) was an Iranian stage and film actress and director. She received the best actress award at the Sepas Film Festival in 1971 for her performance in the film Mr. Naive.

== Life and career ==
Khorvash was born on 31 May 1929. She attended university intending to train as a doctor. However, she became a teacher in Tehran, at which point she began performing in theatre. In 1948, her role in the play Dirty Hands (by Jean-Paul Sartre) was acclaimed and she was encouraged to also look at the cinema. Although she performed in the theatre and in cinema in parallel, she was not keen to switch to the silver screen completely in her earlier years.

In 1958, she acted in her first film, Bohloul. Although women were already becoming prominent in Iranian dramatics, her decision to take to the stage estranged her from her parents for several years. However, she received support from her husband and was able to pursue her acting career.

In 1971, her film Mr. Naive won a Jury award at the Moscow International Film Festival, and was a hit in Iran. She won a best actress award at the Sepas festival that year.

By 1972, the Iranian Ministry of Cultural Affairs had imposed strict guidelines in the depiction of nudity and sexual relations. A genre of popular film called filmfarsi constantly pushed against the boundaries. Inspired by, and competing in the popular space with, sexually overt European cinema, filmfarsi attempted to sell the erotic to the masses. In the advertisements for the 1973 film Chaos, Khorvash's photograph appeared in which she posed on her knees in underwear. Her role was one of several wives of the protagonist, a middle-aged man, who despite being unattractive somehow managed to find women to have sex with.

Khorvash's performance in Prince Ehtejab (1974) as the hapless maid forced by the eponymous prince to pretend to be his wife was well-received.

In 1976, Khorvash starred in Mohammad Reza Aslani's Chess of the Wind (Shatranj-e Baad). Criticising the royal government and featuring understated homosexuality as well a strong female protagonist, it was suppressed after only two screenings. The reels were feared lost and resurfaced only in 2014. Khorvash played a paraplegic woman who is hounded by various relatives to give up her fortune.

Khorvash's reputation and ability made her one of the few actors in Iranian cinema to continue her career in cinema in the period after the Iranian Revolution. She had never acted in a television series before 1979, though she had directed episodes of the long-running serial Qamar Khanoum's House (1967–1971), but she appeared in several TV series in the post-revolutionary years, including the TV series Amir Kabir (1985) in which she played Mahd-e Olia, the mother of Naser al-Din Shah Qajar.

Her last film, A Little Kiss was released in 2005.

In 2010, Khorvash moved to the United States to be closer to her children. She was honored for her lifetime achievements at the Iranian Film Festival in San Francisco that year.

Khorvash died on 10 June 2023, at the age of 94.

== Selected works ==
=== Film ===
- (1955) For You directed by Sadegh Bahrami
- (1956) Island Advisor directed by Jamshid Sheibani
- (1958) Bohloul, directed by Sadegh Bahrami.
- (1958) Chivalrous Vagabond (Lat-e Javanmard), directed by Majid Mohseni.
- (1971) Mr. Naive, also known as Mr. Gullible (Aghaye Halou), directed by Dariush Mehrjui.
- (1973) Chaos (Shir to shir), directed by Mansur Purmand.
- (1974) Prince Ehtejab (Shazdeh Ehtejab), directed by Bahman Farmanara.
- (1976) Chess of the Wind (Shatranj-e Baad), directed by Mohammed Reza Aslani.
- (2005) A Little Kiss (Yek Booseh Khuchulu), directed by Bahman Farmanara.

=== Television ===
- (1967–1971) Qamar Khanoum's House (director)
- (1985) Amir Kabir

=== Books ===
- Zendegī rū-ye ṣaḥne [Life on stage] (in Persian). Bonyād-e Honar. 2018. ISBN 978-1984379535.

== Bibliography ==
- Atwood, Blake (2016). "When the sun goes down: Sex, desire and cinema in 1970s Tehran". Asian Cinema. 27 (2): 127–150. doi:10.1386/ac.27.2.127_1.
- Dunning, John Harris (30 September 2020). "'Audiences won't have seen anything like this': how Iranian film Chess of the Wind was reborn". The Guardian.
- Jahed, Parviz (2012). Directory of World Cinema: Iran. Intellect Books. ISBN 978-1-84150-595-4.
- Haghighat, Mamad; Sabouraud, Frédéric (1999). Histoire du cinéma iranien: 1900-1999. Bibliothèque publique d'information, Centre Georges Pompidou. ISBN 978-2-84246-041-9.
- "I Long to Play in Nasser Taghvai's Films" (in Persian). Honar Online. 4 February 2017.
- "براي 84 سالگي "فخري خوروش"". Iranian Students' News Agency (in Persian). 10 June 2013.
- Rubin, Don; Soo Pong, Chua; Chaturvedi, Ravi; Tanokura, Minoru; Majumdar, Ramendu, eds. (2001). "Iran". The World Encyclopedia of Contemporary Theatre: Asia/Pacific. Taylor & Francis. ISBN 9780415260879.
- Saeedi, Waheed (30 July 2017). "فخري خوروش: به خاطر سينما از خانواده طرد شدم". Haft Sobh (in Persian).
- Sheibani, Khatereh (2016). "The Aesthetics of (Dis)Empowered Motherhood in Iranian Cinema (1965–1978)". In Sayed, Asma (ed.). Screening Mothers: Motherhood in Contemporary World Cinema. Demeter. ISBN 978-1926452494.
- Tehrani, Sara (16 September 2010). "Iranian Film Festival honored Fakhri Khorvash". Cinema Without Borders.
- Thomas, Kevin (20 April 1991). "'Prince Ehtejab' an Exquisite Look at a Despotic Dynasty". Los Angeles Times.
