= Soudabeh Fazaeli =

Iranian author, researcher and translator

Soudabeh Fazaeli (Persian: سودابه فضائلی) (born in 1947) is an Iranian author, researcher and translator, specially known for her works in the field of mythology and semiotics. Over four decades of prolific career, she has published more than 40 books among which are some of the most referenced works in scholarly articles, writings and academic journals. Fazaeli studied English Literature (1969–1972) at the University of Cambridge, Cambridge, Pahlavi Language (1976) at the École pratique des hautes études, and Comparative Literature (1973–1977) at the Paris-Sorbonne University, Paris. For the time being, she lives in Tehran and has recently finished her third novel in Persian.

== Works ==
- Farhang-i Namād-hā (Dictionnaire des symboles: mythes, reves, coutumes)(1999/ 1378) by Jean Chevalier, Alain Gheerbrant, translated into Persian by Soudabeh Fazaeli
- Rooh-e Naghamat (L'ame des sons) (2004) by Jean During; translated into Persian by Soudabeh Fazaeli
- Mousighi Va Erfan (1999) by Jean During; translated into Persian by Soudabeh Fazaeli
- Tarot des Bohemiens by Papus (1994) by Gerard Encausse (Papus); translated by Soudabeh Fazaeli
- Religion in Ancient History (1969) by S. G. F. Brandon; translated into Persian by Soudabeh Fazaeli
- Mythological Motifs in Iranian Contemporary Stories: (Derakht-e Anjir-e Maābed, Bāghe Anāri, Jāee Digar, Kājhāye Mowarrab) by Roqayyeh Mahmoodiwand-Bakhtyari, Parvaneh Adelzadeh, Kamran Pashayi Fakhri; translated by Soudabeh Fazaeli
