= Iranian National Cinematheque =

The Iranian National Cinematheque (Persian: فیلم‌خانه ملی ایران) is a film archive located in Tehran, Iran.

== History ==
Iranian National Cinematheque is an archive about cinema of Iran. This institution, which is a non-profit organization, is located next to the Iranian Cinema Museum in Ferdous Garden, Tehran.

In the last years of the 1950s, in the era known as the Iranian New Wave, the necessity of creating an organization to preserve, organize, prepare, present and show cinematographic works in the press was raised. After that, in 1949, an assembly named "Film Center" was formed, which was later named "Iran Film Archive" and in 1973, it was named "Iran National Film Library". After a long break, since 1984, by compiling applications and using the experiences of world-renowned cinemas, the Iranian National Cinematheque regained its position as an information center in Iran with the aim of publishing and presenting cinematic knowledge and culture.
