= Sheida Gharachedaghi =

Iranian composer

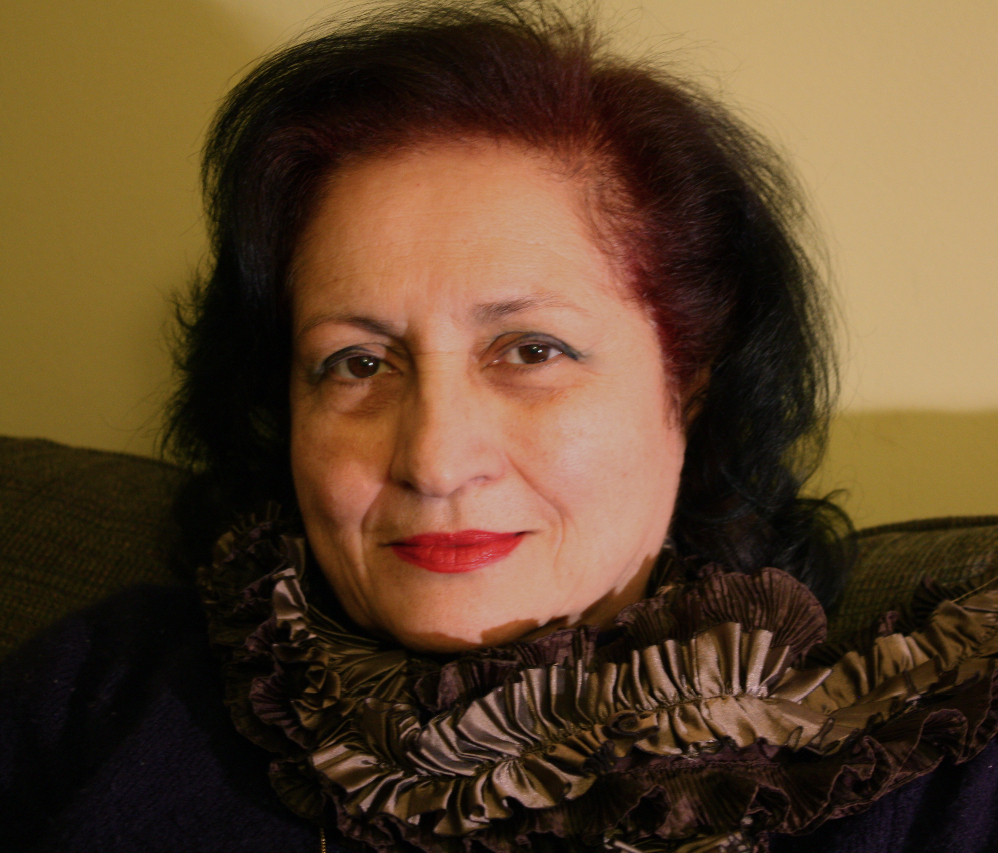
Sheida Gharachedaghi

Sheida Gharachedaghi (Persian: شیدا قرچه‌داغی) is a Persian-Canadian composer and music educator, based in Montreal.

== Life and career ==
Born in Tehran in 1941, Sheida Gharachedaghi studied at the Vienna Music Academy in Austria and in 1971 established the Music Department at the Institute for the Intellectual Development of Children and Young Adults in Tehran. Shortly after the 1979 Islamic Revolution in Iran Gharachedaghi moved to Germany and later settled in Canada.

== The Fairies ==
In 1989 Sheida Gharachedaghi wrote an opera based on the English translation of Ahmad Shamlu's The Fairies. The opera premiered at Metropolitan Convention Centre in Toronto in 1989. The CD of 1989 - live performance of this opera released in Europe in July 2020, on the 20th anniversary of Shamlu's death. The opera had not been published in Iran due to the ban of solo-women singing. The Fairies is the first Persian (Iranian) opera with an English libretto. The British journal Opera cited it as a "distinctly pre-modernist piece..." which "has so little to do with the tradition of Persian music."

== Selected compositions ==
Instrumental

- In Memory of Forough Farrokhzad (for piano solo)
- Duo (for flute and piano)
- Chahargah (for clarinet and piano)
- Dialogue (for cello and piano)

Voice and orchestra

- Voice of the Poet: Baba-Taher (11th-century Persian poetry for voice and orchestra; performed by Pari Zanganeh and IIDCYA Orchestra in 1974)

Opera

- The Fairies (an English opera setting of the Persian poetry by Ahmad Shamlu; premiered in Toronto in 1989, released in 2020)

Music for children

- Cheshm, Cheshm, Do Abru [Eye, Eye, Two Eyebrows], IIDCYA, Tehran, 1975. (Vinyl)

Books

- The Window to the Garden (Short Pieces for Piano). Farabi Publications, Montreal, 1990.

Film music

- Gharachedaghi has written music for around 40 films, TV serials and animations including "Ragbar" [Downpour], directed by Nasser Taghvai in 1971 and "The Chess Game of the Wind" by Mohammad Reza Aslani in 1976.
