= Bita Farrahi =

Iranian actress (1959–2023)

- بيتا فرهی
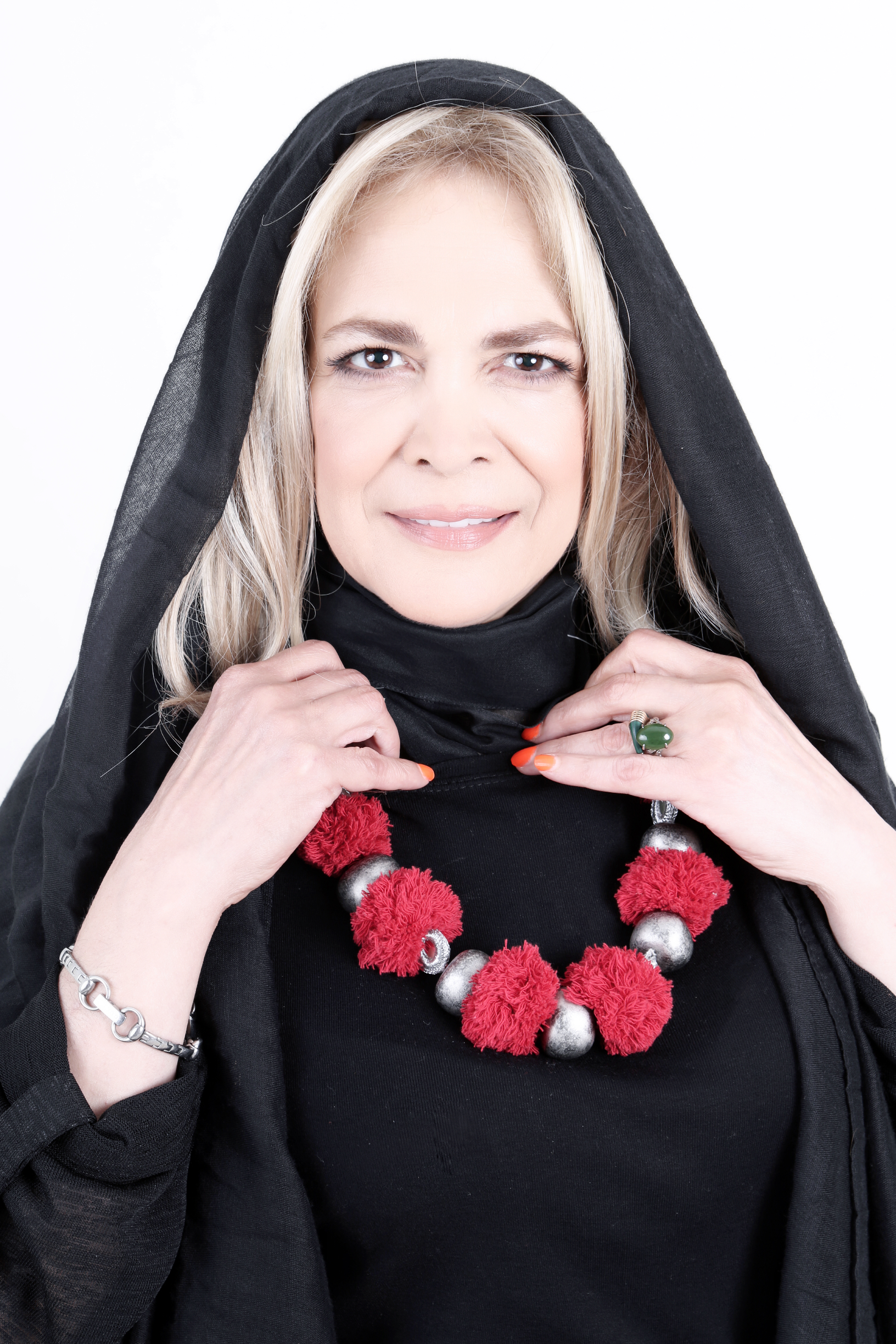
- Bita Farrahi By Payam Eraee (2017)
- Born: Bita Lahrakhani; 3 January 1958; Tehran, Iran
- Died: 25 November 2023 (aged 65); Tehran, Iran
- Occupation: Actress
- Years active: 1989–2023
- Spouse: Hassan Ghoreishy (m. 1973)
- Children: Mahsa Ghoreishy

Bita Lahrakhani (Persian: بیتا لهارخانی; 3 January 1958 – 25 November 2023), better known as Bita Farrahi (Persian: بيتا فرهی), was an Iranian actress.

== Career ==
Bita Farrahi studied art at John Powers' School in the United States. She worked as a professional model for art magazines in California, left the US in 1985, and returned to Iran. Her talent as an actress was noticed by director Darius Mehrjui. She began her acting career with Hamoun in 1989. She was most noted for her willingness to play the roles of intellectual, independent women who are struggling with family and psychological problems.

== Life ==
Bita Farahi Laharkhani was born on January 3, 1958, in Tehran, Iran. She is the daughter of Monir Farahi and Cyrus Laharkhani Dinbali, and she is the niece of Farhang Farahi. Bita's mother was involved in artistic activities in the 1930s and performed on theater stages, while her father produced cultural and artistic programs for Radio Tehran.

In 1973, Bita Farahi married Hassan Ghoreishy, the head of Keyhan Publications. She won the Miss World Award in 1973. In 1978, Bita Farahi went to the United States to continue her studies, attending the John Robert Powers School in California. She returned to Iran in 1981.

Naser Cheshmazar introduced her to Dariush Mehrjui for the role of Mahshid in the film "Hamoun" (1989), marking Bita Farahi's debut in acting at the age of 31. Her performance in "Hamoun" earned her the Diploma of Honor for Best Actress in a Leading Role at the 8th Fajr Film Festival. In the following years, Farahi continued her career with directors such as Ahmad Reza Darvish, Bahman Farmanara, Masoud Kimiai, and Rakhshan Bani-Etemad, receiving nominations for the Crystal Simorgh Award for her roles in "Kimia" (1994), "A House on Water" (2001), and "Blood Play" (2006).

In 2017, she appeared as a guest on the television show "Dorehami," directed by Mehran Modiri, and also participated in "Khandevaneh," directed by Rambod Javan, in 2018.

== Personal life ==
Bita Farahi was the only child of her family and spent her childhood in the vicinity of Baharestan Square. Encouraged by her uncle, Farhang Farahi, Bita participated in the "Best Daughter" competition in 1973. During the event, she met Mr. Hassan Ghoreishy, the head of Keyhan Publications, and their acquaintance paved the way for Bita's marriage to Hassan Ghoreishy.

In the later years of her life, Bita Farahi divided her time between Paris and Tehran. She had a daughter named Mahsa Ghoreishy, who resides in France.

== Death ==
She died on 25 November 2023, at the age of 64.

== Awards and honors ==
Year	Title	Category	Festival	Result
1368	Hamoun	Diploma of Honor for Best Actress in a Leading Role	8th Fajr Film Festival	Won
1373	Kimia	Crystal Simorgh for Best Actress in a Leading Role	13th Fajr Film Festival	Nominated
1380	A House on Water	Crystal Simorgh for Best Supporting Actress	20th Fajr Film Festival	Nominated
1383	Enchanted Ones	Best Actress in a Leading Role (TV Series)	World of Image Festival	Won
1385	Blood Play	Crystal Simorgh for Best Supporting Actress	25th Fajr Film Festival	Nominated
1385	Blood Play	Best Actress	33rd Pyongyang International Film Festival	Won
1385	Blood Play	Best Actress in a Leading Role	Karachi Film Festival	Won
1388	Waiting for a Miracle	Best Supporting Actress	30th Fajr Film Festival	Nominated

== Filmography ==
Cinema

Year	Film title	Role	Director
1968	Hamoun	Mahshid	Dariush Mehrjui
1970	Lady (released in 1977)	Maryam Banu	Dariush Mehrjui
1973	Kimia	Dr. Shokouh	Ahmadreza Darvish
1975	Cardboard Hotel	Homa	Sirus Alvand
1976	Life	Malek	Asghar Hashemi
1978	Protest	Manijeh Majdi	Masoud Kimiai
1978	Mix	Herself	Dariush Mehrjui
1980	A House on Water	Mrs. Taleghani	Bahman Farmanara
1985	Parkway	Flor	Fereydoun Jeyrani
1985	Blood Play	Sima	Rakhshān Banietemad
1986	Familiar Soil	Zhaleh	Bahman Farmanara
1987	Shirin	One of the audience	Abbas Kiarostami
1989	Waiting for a Miracle		Rasoul Sadr-Ameli
1989	Shish and Bash	Parvin	Bahman Ghobadi
1991	Glad Tidings to a Third Millennium Citizen		Mohammad Hadi Karimi
1993	Love Era	Mitra's mother	Alireza Raissian
1994	When I Returned...	Nasrin	Vahid Mosayyebian
1997	The Last Story (Animation)	Evil Spirit (Voice)	Ashkan Rahgozar
1998	Legal Consent		Amir Pourkian
1998	Laminar		Dariush Mehrjui
2001	Sometimes in Eternity		Mehdi Noruzian
2016	My Brother Khosrow	Nahid	Ehsan Biglari

Television

Year	TV Series	Role	Director	Network
1976 (Aired in 1999)	Green Land	Saba Bahador	Bijan Birang	Channel 2
1979	State of Love	Azardokht	Mehdi Fakhimzadeh	Channel 1
1981	Father of the Earth		Nader Kajuri	Channel 2
1983	Enchanted Ones	Nasrin	Dariush Farhang	Tehran Channel
1992-1997 (Aired in 2002)	Motherland	Aghdasolmolk Bahaduri	Kamal Tabrizi	Channel 3
1989	Memory of That Rainy Night (Telefilm)		Siamak Shayeghi	
1990	Scratch (Telefilm)	Shokouh	Mohammad Hamzehi	
1993	Souvenir (Telefilm)		Nima Tabatabaei	
1996	Irandocht		Mohammadreza Varzi	Channel 1
1998	Forgotten Memories	Shokooholsaltaneh	Bahram Bahramian	

Home Theater

Year	Production
1997	Dancing on Glass
2000	Island

Short Film

Year	Production
1982	Mirror and Smoke

- Hamoun (1989)
- Baanoo (1991 - aka The Lady, released in 1999)
- Kimia (1995 - aka Alchemy)
- Cardboard Hotel (1997)
- Life (1997)
- Reign of Love (2000 - TV Series)
- Eteraz (2000 - aka Protest)
- Khanei ruye ab (2002 - aka A House Built on Water)
- Pedar e Khak (2001- aka The Father of the Dust)
- Telesmshodegan (2004- TV Series)
- Khoon bazi (2006 - aka Mainline)
- Parkway (2007)
- Khak e Ashena (2008)
- Shab va Ghasham be Deltangi (2010)
- Shish va Besh (2011)
- Kharash (aka Scra) (2011)
- Island (2021 - 2022 TV Series)
