= Murder of Dariush Mehrjui =

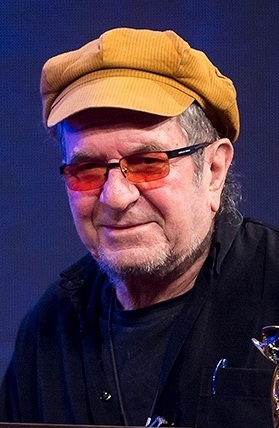
Mehrjui in 2018

On October 15, 2023, Iranian filmmaker Dariush Mehrjui and his wife, actress Vahideh Mohammadifar, were fatally stabbed by an unknown assailant at their residence at Zibadasht, near the city of Karaj. The couple were pronounced dead at the scene. The motive for the attack was not clear, but some speculated that it could be related to Mehrjui's controversial films or his criticism of the Iranian government. Mehrjui is regarded as one of the pioneers of the Iranian New Wave and has won several international awards for his works. He has also faced censorship and harassment from the authorities for his social and political themes. Mohammadifar is also a prominent actress who has appeared in many of Mehrjui's films as well as other Iranian productions.

== Murder ==
Mehrjui's daughter discovered the bodies when she visited her parents. The couple's bodies were in their house, with Vahideh's head almost severed.

== Investigation ==
Iranian police investigations revealed that the main cause of the murder attempt is unclear, but some gold items have been stolen. on first police reports that they take custody of 10 people related to the murder. They finally reported that the police took custody of the main killer. Police stated later that day that the crime scene showed “no evidence of a break-in”, and that the doors of their house were “intact”. However, they also said they found “some clues” that they think are “linked to the killer”.

The main suspect confessed to the murders, saying that he was a former employee of Mehrjui who harbored a grudge against him "due to financial issues". He was subsequently sentenced to death in February 2024 while the three others received prison terms ranging from eight to 36 years for being accomplices to the crime.

== Burial ==
Many Iranians, both at home and abroad, expressed their sorrow for the death of Mehrjui.

== Aftermath ==
The murders raise suspicions over the involvement of the authorities, amid a crackdown against dissidents of the Tehran regime. Mehrjui, 83, was a renowned cofounder of the Iranian New Wave in the early 1970s that mainly focused on realism, and had been a vocal critic of state censorship. Last year, he strongly protested against a government decision to ban his latest film. His killing also coincides with the recent anniversary of the death of Mahsa Amini in the custody of Iran's morality police, which sparked an uprising and threatened the Islamic republic.

== See also ==
- Chain murders of Iran
