= Sattar Khan (film) =

- Original film poster (designed by Morteza Momayyez)
- Directed by: Ali Hatami
- Written by: Ali Hatami
- Produced by: Parviz Sayyad
- Starring: Ali Nasirian; Enayat Bakhshi; Ezatollah Entezami; Mohammad Ali Keshavarz; Parviz Sayyad; Jahangir Forouhar
- Cinematography: Amir Karari
- Edited by: Hadi Saber; Mehdi Rajayian
- Music by: Fereydoun Naseri
- Release date: 16 October 1972 (Iran)
- Running time: 98 minutes
- Country: Iran
- Language: Persian

Sattar Khan (Persian: ستار خان) is a 1972 Iranian biographical film directed by Ali Hatami. The film is about Sattar Khan, the Iranian national hero, and his primary role in the events of Persian Constitutional Revolution. Ali Nasirian, Ezzatollah Entezami, Parviz Sayyad, Enayat Bakhshi, and Jahangir Forouhar are among the actors.

== Cast ==
- Ali Nasirian as Sattar Khan
- Enayat Bakhshi as Bagher Khan
- Ezzatollah Entezami as Haydar Khan e Amo-oghli
- Parviz Sayyad as Ali Monsieur
- Mohammad Ali Keshavarz as Abbas Atabak
- Jahangir Forouhar
- Mohammad Ali Sepanlu
- Jalal Pishvayian
- Abdol-Ali Homayun
- Sadegh Bahrami
- Sirous Ebrahim Zadeh
- Bagher Sahrarudi
