= Night of the Hunchback =

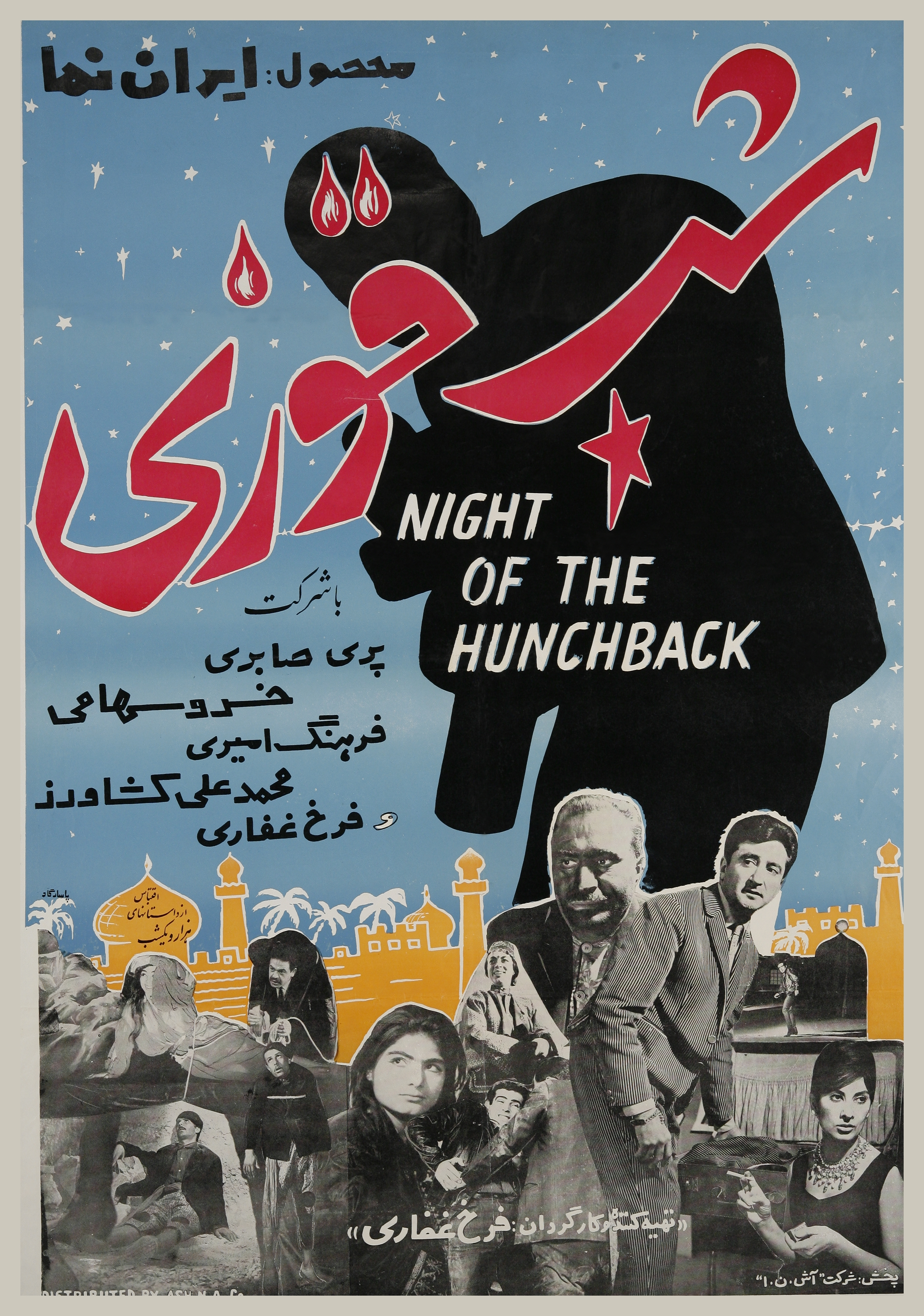
- Theatrical poster
- شب قوزی
- Directed by: Farrokh Ghaffari
- Screenplay by: Farrokh Ghaffari; Jalal Moghadam
- Story by: One Thousand and One Nights
- Produced by: Farrokh Ghaffari
- Starring: Mohammad Ali Keshavarz; Farrokh Ghaffari; Zakaria Hasehmi; Pari Saberi; Khosrow Sahami
- Cinematography: Gerium Hayrapetian
- Edited by: Ragnar
- Music by: Hussein Malek
- Production company: Iran Nama
- Distributed by: Ashena Company
- Release date: 1965
- Running time: 91 min
- Country: Iran
- Language: Persian

Night of the Hunchback (Persian: شب قوزی, romanized: Shab-e Quzi) is a 1965 Iranian film comedy, directed and produced by Farrokh Ghaffari. The film script was based on a story from One Thousand and One Nights, but arranged for modern city life in Tehran. This was Ghaffari's third film after Jonub-e Shahr (The South of the City) and Arous Kodumeh? (Which One is Bride) which both didn't have a good grossing. Jalal Moghadam (another intellectual film director) and George Lichensky (an Iranian-Assyrian cinematographer) encouraged Ghaffari to make this film. At first the story was set in the medieval times as in the ancient stories of One Thousand and One Nights occurred. However, the censorship office forced Ghaffari to turn the story of the film to a modern setting.

== Plot ==
Night of the Hunchback

Asghar Ghuzi (The Hunchback) is a member of a Persian traditional comedy troupe who perform in theatres or rich people’s houses. One night after the end of a private performance at the residence of a wealthy couple, the landlady (the hostess) gives Asghar a piece of paper, on which is a list of smugglers, to deliver to someone. Asghar goes to the suburbs of the city to have dinner with his friends, but accidentally dies when one of his friends tries to put some food in his mouth by force. His friends, shocked by his sudden death, get rid of his corpse by dumping it next to a barbershop. The owners of the barbershop, who are smugglers and intend to go on a trip, put Asghar's body in the yard of a house where there happens to be a wedding reception. Yet, when they leave the shop, they are suspected by the police. The bride's father finds the dead body and takes it out of town. The hostess is informed of Asghar’s death and goes after a drunken man who found the list of names in Asghar’s pocket by chance. They are tailed and found in a bakery. The police arrive and arrest the woman, the man, and his collaborators.

== Cast ==
- Pari Saberi as The hostess
- Paria Hakemi
- Khosrow Sahami as Ahmad the hunchback
- Mohammad Ali Keshavarz as Jamal, The smuggler
- Zakaria Hashemi as Police officer
- Farrokh Ghaffari as Manuch, Smuggler's assistant
- Reza Hushmand
- Farrokhlagha Houshmand
- Farhang Amiri

== Reception ==
Critics like Georges Sadoul and Hajir Dariush admired the film. Film was also screened at the 1964/65 Cannes and Locarno festivals.
