= Enayatollah Bakhshi =

Iranian actor (1945–2026)

- عنایت‌الله بخشی
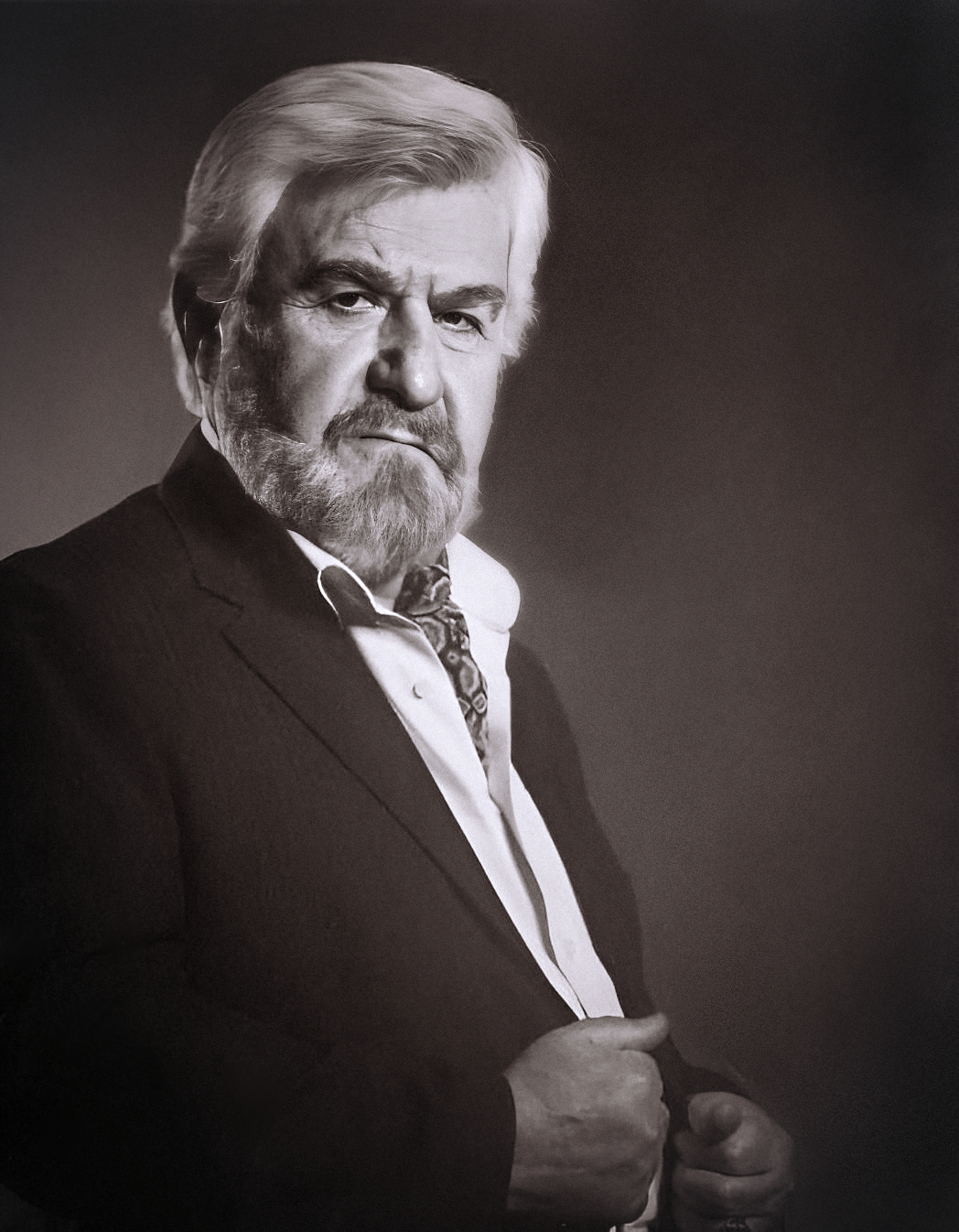
- Born: March 27, 1945; Taleqan, Iran
- Died: February 15, 2026 (aged 80)
- Occupation: Actor
- Years active: 1965–2026
- Spouse: Simin Bazarjani
- Children: 3

Enayatollah Bakhshi (Persian: عنایت‌الله بخشی; March 27, 1945 – February 15, 2026), commonly known as Enayat Bakhshi (عنایت بخشی), was an Iranian veteran actor. Over six decades of artistic activity, he appeared in more than 170 plays. He was considered one of the most well-known actors, playing the antihero role in the history of Iranian cinema. He cooperated with some of the notable Iranian film directors, including Ebrahim Golestan, Bahram Beyzai, Ali Hatami, Amir Naderi, Masoud Kimiai, Dariush Mehrjoui, and Davood Mir-Bagheri. He received a First Grade Certificate in Art (equivalent to PhD) from the Ministry of Culture and Islamic Guidance of Iran.

Bakhshi took part in many movies, including Mr. Naive (1970), Sattar Khan (1972), Tangna (1973), Tangsir (1973), The Deer (1974), Senator (1983), Travellers (1991), The Fateful Day (1994), and Killing Mad Dogs (2000). He also took part in various TV series, such as The First Man (1976), Sarbadars (1984), Imam Ali (1991), Heroes Don't Die (1997), and Tabriz in Fog (2010).

In 2025, he received a Diploma Honorary for Best Supporting Actor for the movie Shah Naqsh from the 43rd Fajr Film Festival.

== Life and career ==
Bakhshi was born on March 27, 1945, in Taleqan, a city west of Tehran. He was taught acting from Hamid Samandarian in the young age. In 1965, he began his acting career with the National Art Group, headed by Abbas Javanmard. After two years with the group, he joined Imperial Iranian Air Force and subsequent to taking several electronics and English courses, he began teaching in the two fields.

After 10 years of serving the armed forces, he became employed by the Department of Theatre and began his artistic activity.

In 1970, he married Simin Bazarjani. She is the screenwriter of Iranian films such as My Daughter Sahar (1989) and Bat (1997). Bakhshi lived in Tehran and had a son named Arash.

Bahkshi died at a hospital on February 15, 2026, at the age of 80.

== Selected filmography ==
- Mr. Naive (1970)
- Sattar Khan (1972)
- Tangna (1973)
- Tangsir (1973)
- The Ghost Valley's Treasure Mysteries (1974)
- The Deer (1974)
- The Falconet (1975)
- Safe Place (1977)
- Flying in a Cage (1978)
- Senator (1983)
- Struggle (1985)
- Train (1988)
- Travellers (1991)
- The Devoted (1991)
- The Victim (1991)
- Enfejar Dar Otaghe Amal (1992)
- Love-stricken (1992)
- The Fateful Day (1994)
- Enemy (1995)
- Sharareh (1999)
- The Visitor of Rey (2000)
- Killing Mad Dogs (2000)
- Good Friends (2015)

== Selected TV series ==
- The First Man (1976)
- Sarbadars (1984)
- Avicenna (1985)
- Shaheed-e-Kufa (1991)
- The Hidden Half of the Moon (1994)
- Heroes Don't Die (1997)
- A Place of Love (2000)
- The Young Officer (2001)
- Reyhaneh (2005)
- Zire Tigh (2006)
- Tabriz in Fog (2010)
- A Piece of Land (2012)
- Breach (2013)
- The Enigma of the Shah (2014–2016)
- All That Is (2018)
