= Annik Shefrazian =

Iranian Armenian actress

- Born: 1909 or 1910; Isfahan, Iran
- Died: 28 December 1996; Kahrizak, Tehran
- Occupations: Film and television actress

Annik Shefrazian (Armenian: Աննիկ Շաֆրազեան; Persian: آنیک شفرازیان), known mononymously as Annik (Armenian: Աննիկ; Persian: آنیک) was an Iranian Armenian actress of film and television.

== Biography ==
Born in 1909 or 1910 in New Julfa, Isfahan. She followed the advice of her sister-in-law, a stage artist, to join theater groups and played bit parts with them touring Abadan, before landing her debut in Samuel Khachikian's The Stroke in 1964, she moved to Tehran and made acquaintance with Khachikian and Arman, and found her way into Armenian show groups. In 1968 Khachikian referred to her another role in The White Hell, which later led to winning character parts in veteran directors' films. Her films include The Coachman (Nosrat Karimi, 1971), Prince Ehtejab (Bahman Farmanara, 1974), The Chess of the Wind (Mohammadreza Asalni, 1977), The Crow (Bahram Bayzai, 1978) and Hamoun (Dariush Mehrjui, 1990). She won the Crystal Symorgh at Best Supporting Actress for her role in The Land of Dreams (Majid Qarizade) in 1988. She died at a nursing home in Kahrizak, Tehran in 1996.

== Filmography ==
- The Stroke (1964)
- The White Hell (1968)
- The Coachman (1971)
- Prince Ehtejab (1974)
- The Crow or The Raven (1976 - aka Kalāq)
- The Chess Game of the Wind (1977)
- The Land of Dreams (1988)
- Hamoun (1990)
