= Mohammad Reza Aslani =

Iranian writer, poet, film director and screenwriter

- محمدرضا اصلانی
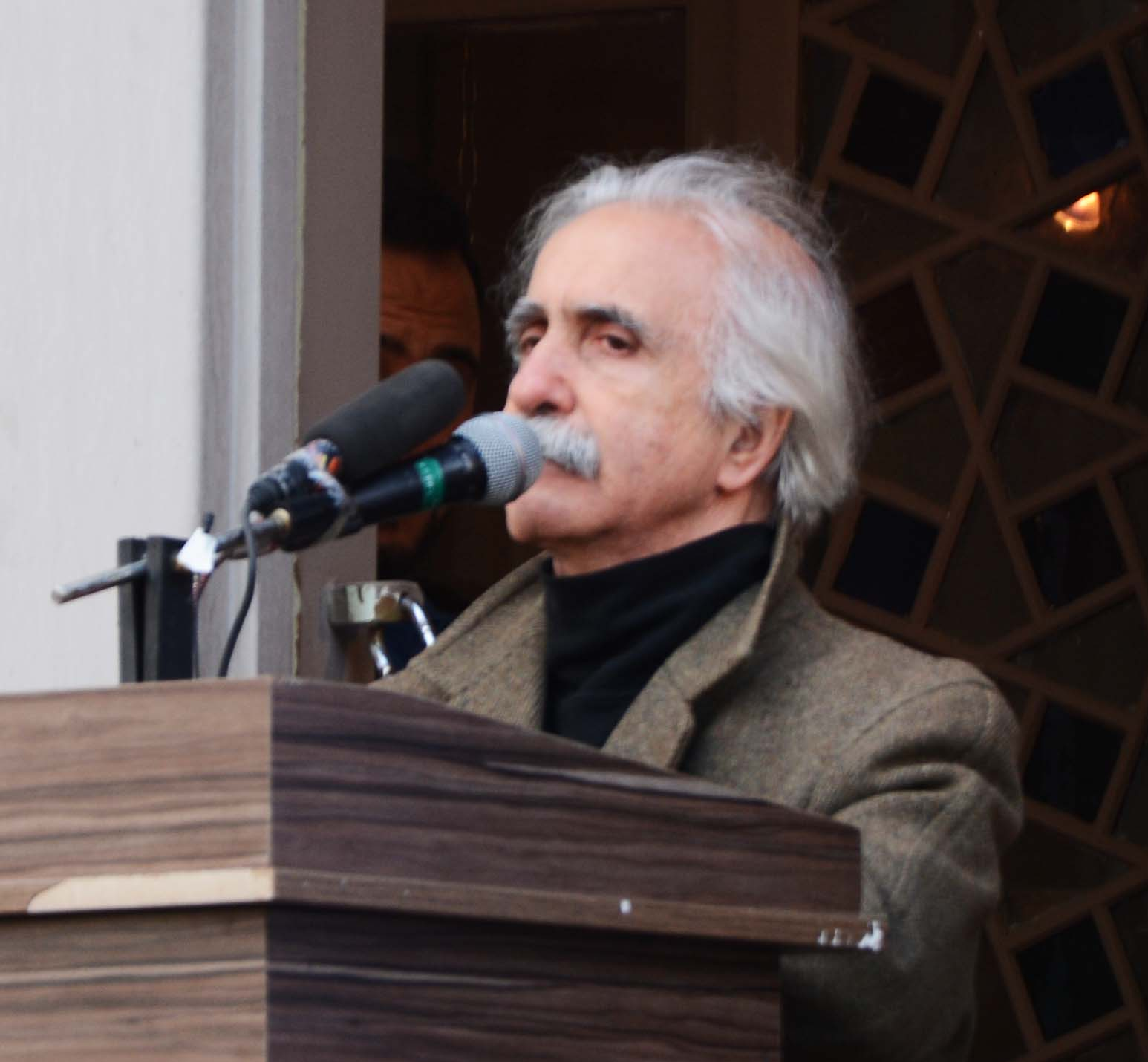
- Aslani in 2015
- Born: 9 December 1943 (age 82); Rasht, Iran
- Education: School of Decorative Arts; Technical School of Television and Cinema
- Occupations: Writer, Director, Poet and Art Researcher
- Spouse: Soudabeh Fazaeli (m. 1978)
- Children: Amin; Gita; Narges

Mohammad Reza Aslani (Persian: محمدرضا اصلانی; born 9 December 1943) is an Iranian filmmaker, art theorist, graphic designer and poet known mostly for his experimental films and documentaries. He is also the co-writer of Espacementalism manifesto - although he never signed the manifesto - and one of the main poets of the New Wave Poetry of Iran alongside Yadollah Royaee, Fereydoun Rahnema and Ahmadreza Ahmadi.

== Personal life ==
Mohammad Reza Aslani studied painting at the University of Art. He graduated with a graduate diploma in Filmmaking with specialization in Production Design through the first cohort of the Technical School of Television and Cinema under Mostafa Farzaneh. He is married to Soudabeh Fazaeli, a novelist and researcher. They have a son Amin who is also a filmmaker and two daughters Gita and Narges.

== Career ==
=== Poetry ===
Mohammad Reza Aslani started off his career as a poet before becoming a renowned as a filmmaker. He and his wife, Soudabeh Fazaeli mostly recognize themselves as participants of a particular literary movement called Alternative Poem (She'er-e-Digar) and Alternative Prose (Nathr-e-Digar). Some of the important figures of this movement includes Bijan Elahi, Yadollah Royaee, Bahram Ardabili, and Hushang Irani. Some researchers including Esmaeel NooriAla believe his poetry is influential through the New Wave Poetry of Iran.

In 1962, Mohammad Reza Aslani and some of his classmates in school of decorative arts such as published a book of poetry named Shabhâye Nimkati, Roozhây-e-Bâd (Bench-y Nights, Wind Days) which went viral through Iranian literary salons at the time and was considered as avant-garde future of the new wave poetry and also graphic design. He mentions that in school of decorative arts, instead of learning any classical form of painting, he directly started to learn modern architecture and art and their worldview towards the environment became his questions as well. His questions beside the questions of the Imagist in England or France was also what he called the plasticity of the image in poetry.

Although his style is sometimes similar to some of his contemporaries like Ahmadi or Farrokhzad, he believed that style of the artist forms around the essential needs and emotions of his soul. For the same reason his poetry does not have the musicality of Nima's poetry and also does not have the emotional variation and sentimentalism of the Ahmadi's poems as well. He brought everyday language to poetry, not like any other, and with a painting-like composition.

Aslani later abandoned the New Wave Poetry into the New Wave Cinema. With his second book, Bar Tafâzol-e-Do Maghreb (On Differential of Two Occidents), he disappointed New Wave movement by revising his style and aesthetics and also in his third book, Soognâme-ye-Sâlha-ye-Mamnooe (Requiem of the Abandoned Years), he completely opposed his own style in his first book. As he mentions:

The group called the New Wave formed two years after this book (Shabhâye Nimkati, Roozhây-e-Bâd). In 1964 we were introduced to the title "New Wave". These poems are the product of 1959-61. In Spring 62 the book was published. I didn't think that I am doing something modern. Afterall, it is ridiculous that one thinks that s/he is doing something modern. I did what I had to do and that's why the second book is different from the first one. The very statement that says because I've found a new style I should stick to it and I should keep working in it, in a way, is nonsense. The question is what path I am in and where this path leads to. I am not committed to any kind of achievement. These achievements can be added up to, but cannot become fixated. This happening is another kind of dogmatism or traditionalism. I try to find a new thing any moment and staying the same for even a moment is meaningless. The question is that how can I form a dynamic movement in myself. The most important thing is how to be honest with ourselves. Being committed to an extrinsic matter is meaningless. Once this collection got published, it is outside of me. Now that they called me "Poet of the New Wave" should I be committed to it? I published this collection as an internal ebullition and also dependent on all elements of modern thinking. This modern thinking is dependent on not a knowledge of painting, but a painterly way of thinking. Painting is not only an art; It is a worldview. Painting turns the world into a visual text. It is a way of thinking. What Kandinsky says that you can make a world with lighting, color tones, and contrasts and compositions does not mean that you have to mimic the world. Anyways, it was an issue for us that poetry is not mere sentimentalism.

In 2019, his new historical-epic poem book called Hezâr Bâde-ye Hezâr Bâd dar Hezâreh-hâye Shab-e-Too-bar-Too (Thousand Wines of Thousand Wind in Millenary of Labyrinth-ed Night) got published after 49 years, since the SAVAK had taken it all away. According to an interview he had to rewrite the whole book of 200 pages based on 30 pages of draft he found in his archive. Many historical and mythological characters of Iranian culture like Rostam, Ayn al-Quzat Hamadani, Al-Hallaj, Bidel Dehlavi and Ya'qub ibn al-Layth al-Saffar are among the characters of this epopee. He wrote this book under the influence of Shahname.

=== Cinema ===
National Iranian Radio and Television logo designed by Mohammad Reza Aslani

As student in school of decorative arts, he used to watch artistic films in Cinematheque of Tehran also known as Film Club (Kanoon-e-Film) with two of his friends and classmates Iraj Anvari and Edward Arshamian. After seeing an announcement poster for production designer recruitment course by Ministry of Arts and Culture, he decided to take the entrance exam for the course which was on the same day. He ended up getting accepted for the filmmaking course which took nine months.

Later he got into the newly founded National Iranian Radio and Television as an art director and senior production designer. He also designed the logo for the Institution. Later he got introduced to Fereydoun Rahnema who was Television's content and research advisor at the time. After Rahnema proposed a program to Reza Ghotbi, the NIRT's head at the time about making experimental documentaries about different parts of Iran, Aslani alongside Basir Nasibi, Parviz Kimiavi, Hassanali Kowsar, Houshang Azadivar, Naser Taghvai and others started making films. Rahnema himself produced his first film Jaam-e-Hasanlou about the golden bowl of Hasanlu. The film consists of scenes from bowl's motifs while the narrator reads from Passion of Al-Hallaj of the Tazkirat al-Awliyā by Attar of Nishapur while the soundtrack consisted of Rappresentatione di Anima, et di Corpo by Emilio de' Cavalieri.

In the world of feature films, he made Chess of the Wind in 1976 with the production of Bahman Farmanara. It took him six years to finance and finally make the movie. It was met with critical acclaim and audience apathy when it opened in Tehran in 1976 and also some controversies while screening the movie and after 1979 revolution towards archiving it made it tough for the movie to come out. The stunning period drama was prohibited by the Islamic Republic and thought to be lost until 2014. In 2020, the Scorsese Foundation restored the movie for Cannes 2020 to be shown in classics section of the festival. He also made The Green Fire in 2008 after years of not working. The film was supposed to be shot in the Bam Citadel but after 2003 Bam earthquake and complete destruction of the citadel, the project was delayed. Later he made the movie in a citadel near Kerman. The movie consists of different narratives in different timelines narrating an old Iranian tale called Sang-e-Sabour.

== Publications ==
During 1983-93 he and his wife founded a publication called Nashr-e-Noghreh. It introduced different style of book design and publishing for its time. Nashr-e-Noghre got closed after its office caught in fire because they have published Women without Men by Shahrnoush Parsipur. In 2020, the publication received necessary permissions to republish once again, and re-opened its new generation of publication.

=== Books ===
==== Poem ====
- Shabhâye Nimkati, Roozhây-e-Bâd (Bench-y Nights, Wind Days), 1962, Re-published 2022
- Bar Tafâzol-e-Do Maghreb (On Differential of Two Occidents), 1972
- Soognâme-ye-Sâlha-ye-Mamnoo'e (Requiem of the Abandoned Years), 1979
- Hezâr Bâde-ye Hezâr Bâd dar Hezâreh-hâye Shab-e-Too-bar-Too (Thousand Wines of Thousand Wind in Millenary of Labyrinth-ed Night), 2019

=== Theoretical and interview ===
- Degarkhâni-e Cinema-ye Mostanad (Alternative Reading on Documentary Cinema), 1999–2010, Publication: 2010
- Hasti-ye Ayineh (The Being of the Mirror), 2018, Interviews with Arash Sanjabi
- Binesh-e-Tasviri dar Iran (Vision of the Image in Iran), Not yet published.

== Filmography ==
=== Documentaries ===
- Mash Esmaeil (1972)
- Koodak-e-Emrooz (Nowadays Child) (1978)
- Ghali va Estethmar (Carpet and Exploitation of Labour) (1979)
- Koodak va Estethmar (Child and Exploitation of Labour) (1982)

=== Experimental and experimental documentaries ===
- Jaam-e-Hasanlou (Golden bowl of Hasanlu) (1964)
- Ghorbat-ol-Gharbia (Occidental Exile) (1967)
- Jaame-e-Fahraj (Congregation of Fahraj) (1968)
- Tarikhaneh (1968)
- Abu Rayhan (1973)
- Chigh (1996)
- Khaterat-e-Yek Haftad-o-Panj Sale (Memoirs of a 75 Years Old) (2007)
- Dast-hay-e-Hegmataaneh (The Hands of the Ecbatana) (2010)
- Che Aftaab-e-Khoshi Darun-e-Oo Mitaft (Such a Pleasant Sunshine was Glowing in Him) (2012)
- Tehran, Honar-e-Mafhoumi (Tehran, Conceptual Art) (2012)
- Jaam-e-Hasanlou: 50 Saal Ba'ad (Golden bowl of Hasanlu: 50 Years Later) (2016)
- Khaaneh-yi bar vosa'at-e Aagaahi (A House as Wide as Consciousness) (2018)

=== Feature films ===
- Shatranj-e-Baad (The Chess Game of The Wind) (1976)
- Atash-e-Sabz (The Green Fire) (2008)

=== Short films ===
- Bad Badeh (1970)
- Chenin Konand Hekayat (Thus they say...) (1977)

=== TV series ===
- Samak-e-Ayyar (Samak the Knight Errant) (1974–75)
- Ghobaar-e-Nour (Dust of the Light) (1997–98)
- Mantegh-ot-Tayr (The Conference of the Birds) (1999)

=== As screenwriter ===
- Soozanbaan (Switchman) (1968) Dir. Manouchehr Tayyab
- Soo-ye Shahr-e Khamoush (Onto Silent City) (1969) Dir. Manouchehr Tayyab
- Sobh-e Rooz-e Chaharom (Fourth Day's Morning) (1972) Dir. Kamran Shirdel
- Mogholha (Mongols) (1973) Dir. Parviz Kimiavi
- Tangna (Strait) (1973) Dir. Amir Naderi
- Marsieh (Requiem) (1975) Dir. Amir Naderi
- Bagh-e Sangui (The Stone Garden) (1976) Dir. Parviz Kimiavi
- Ganj-e Ravaan (Flowing Treasure) (2012) Dir. Amin Aslani
- Baad bar Bagh-e Nazar (Wind on the Watching Garden) (2014) Dir. Pouyan Kazemi
- Derakht-e Banafsh (The Purple Tree) (2019) Dir. Amin Aslani

== Awards and recognition ==
In 2015, Aslani received a certificate of First Order Artistic Badge of Ph.D. equivalent from the Ministry of Culture and Islamic Guidance and Iranian Academy of the Arts.
