= Hamoun =

Hamoun هامون
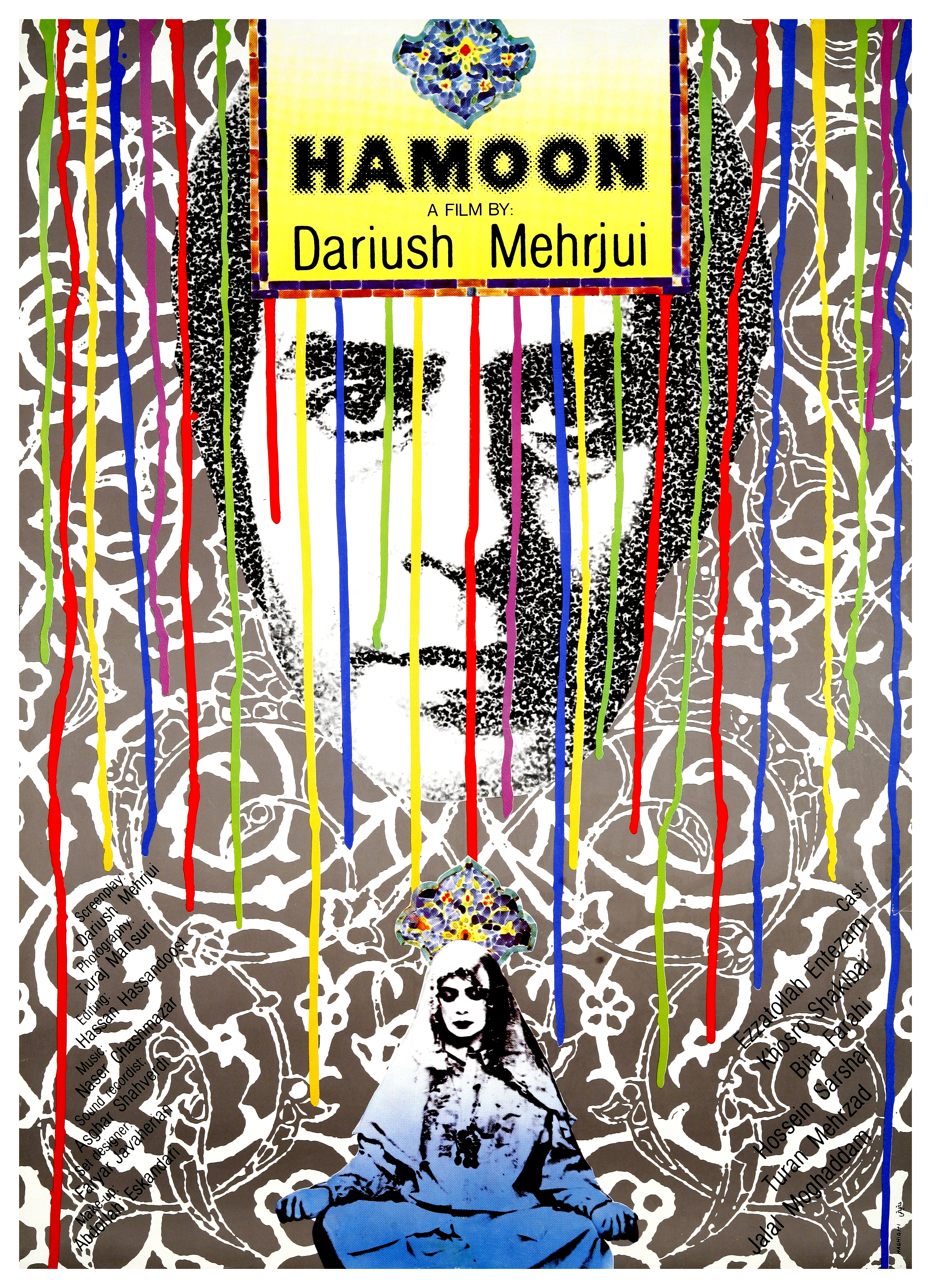
- Directed by: Dariush Mehrjui
- Written by: Dariush Mehrjui
- Starring: Khosrow Shakibai; Bita Farrahi; Ezzatollah Entezami
- Release date: 1989
- Running time: 122 min.
- Country: Iran
- Language: Persian

Hamoun (هامون, also Romanized as Hamoon, Hamun, Hāmoun, Hāmoon, and Hāmun) is a 1989 psychological drama film directed by Dariush Mehrjui. The film tells the story of a middle-class Iranian man — Hamid Hamoun, played by Khosrow Shakibai — and his struggle after his femme fatale wife, Mahshid, played by Bita Farrahi, demands a divorce from him.

Hamoun has since gained a cult following in Iran.

== Plot ==
Hamid Hamoun is an executive at a leading import-export firm in Iran. He lives with his wife Mahshid who is a budding abstract painter. Mahshid hails from a rich family but marries the middle class Hamoun after falling for his intellectual tastes and progressive views. After 7 years of marriage, Mahshid, who once was very much in love with Hamoun, soon sees him as a constricting force against her desire to do something meaningful with her life. Hamoun who wishes to pursue a career as a writer, while simultaneously preparing for his thesis, occasionally takes out his frustration at his wife.

Mahshid soon demands divorce from him. Hamoun is shocked to learn that his wife loves him no more. The story then depicts Hamoun's incapability to deal with the reality of losing his wife and living with his unfulfilled dreams. The subsequent scenes portray Hamoun's realisations, coupled with dreamlike sequences resembling those from some of Federico Fellini's films.

Hamoun vigorously attempts to meet his teacher Ali, whom he greatly admires, but never does. He then gives his grandmother a visit, the purpose of which is to get a rifle which his grandfather had left. Hamoun unsuccessfully attempts to kill his wife, who is now leading a good life on her own. Driven to the brink of madness by helplessness, Hamoun tries suicide by drowning himself in the sea. Hamoun goes through a dream where all his acquaintances and relatives, including his mother and former wife, console him. Hamoun finds out (in the dream) that all his problems have been solved, only to wake up in the boat after being rescued by Ali, his teacher.

== Reception ==
Due to its dream-like sequences and the treatment, Hamoun has been described as having a Federico Fellini touch. In 1997, Hamoun was voted the best Iranian film ever made in a poll by the respected Iranian journal Film Monthly of its readers and critics. The Cow by the same director had previously held that honor.

== Cast ==
- Ezzatolah Entezami as Dabiri
- Bita Farahi as Mahshid
- Sedigheh Kianfar as Nurse of hamoun's grandmother
- Turan Mehrzad as Mahshid's Mother
- Jalal Moghadam as Dr. Samavati
- Fathali Oveisi as the Doctor
- Amrollah Saberi as Hamoun's Chief
- Hossein Sarshar as Salimi
- Khosro Shakibai as Hamid Hamoon
- Annik Shefrazian as Hamoun's Grandmother
- Asadollah Yekta as Little Man
