= Mehri Mehrnia =

Iranian actress (c. 1915–2009)

- مهری مهرنیا
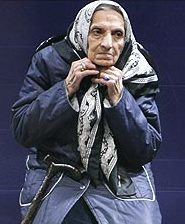
- Born: Fatemeh Marmouzian c. 1915; Savadkuh, Mazandaran province, Qajar Iran
- Died: 18 February 2009; Tehran, Iran
- Burial place: Behesht-e Zahra, Tehran, Iran
- Occupation: Actress

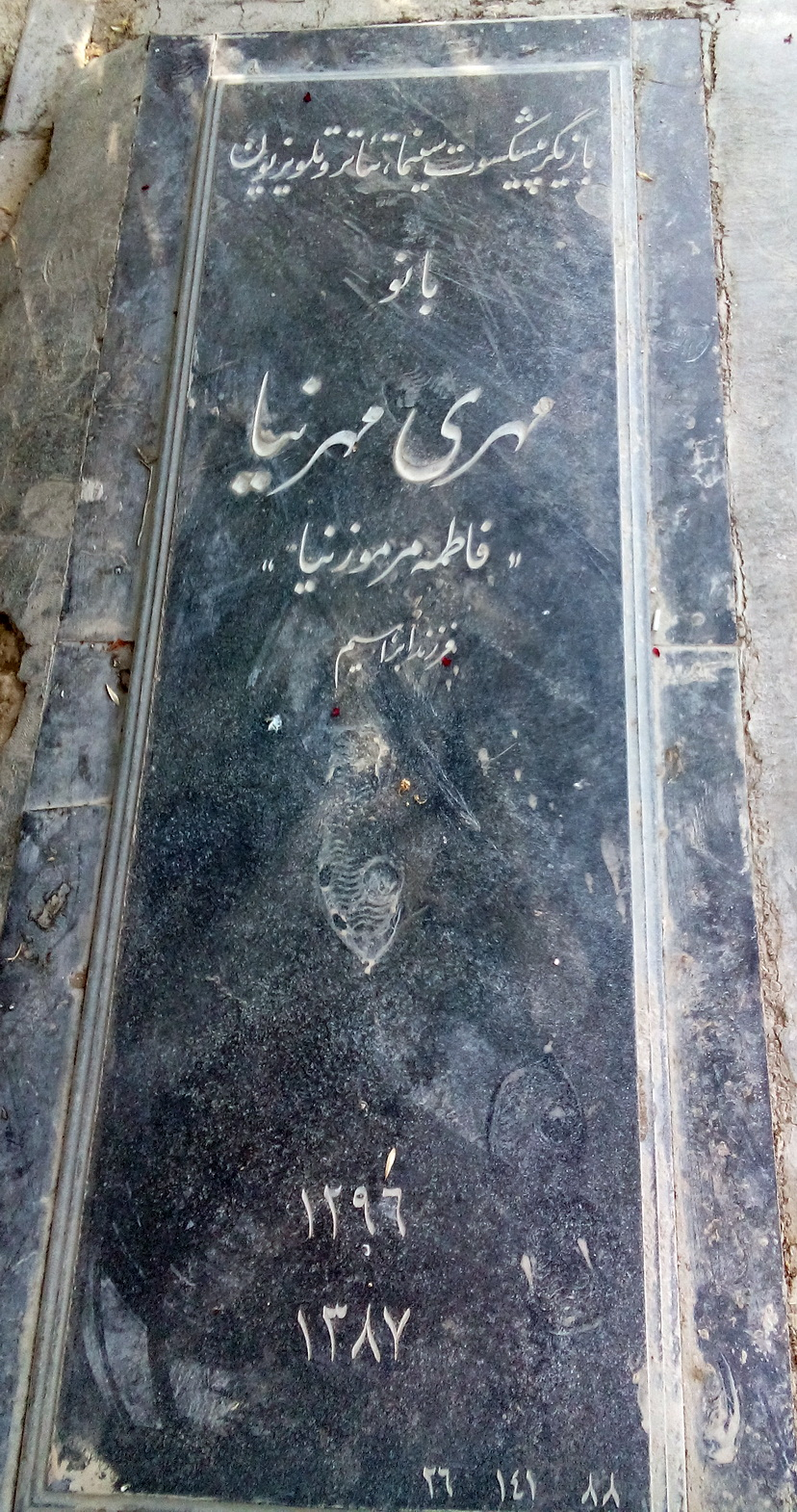
Mehri Mehrnia gravestone in Tehran, Iran

Mehri Mehrnia (Persian: مهری مهرنیا; née Fatemeh Marmouzian; c. 1915 – 2009) was an Iranian actress of film and television. She was known for her roles in The Inner Beast (1983), Dust Devil (1986), and The Rose (1990).

== Life and career ==
Mehri Mehrnia was born as Fatemeh Marmouzian in c. 1915, in Alasht-e Savadkouh, Mazandaran province, Qajar Iran. She attended school until the 6th grade, and left school to start singing and performing.

Mehrnia began her acting career in Amin Amini's film Babysitter (1953 film). She went on to appear in more than 40 films, over 50 years. Her filmography includes Brick and Mirror (1964), Tranquility in the Presence of Others (1972), The Inner Beast (1983), The Bus (film) (1986), Dowry for Robaab (1987), and The Blue Veiled (1995).

In November 2006, she was publicly recognized for her contributions to Iranian cinema at a ceremony held at Tehran's City Theater Complex. She died on 18 February 2009, in Tehran, Iran, and was buried in the artists plots section at Behesht-e Zahra.
