= Pari (1995 film) =

Pari (پری)
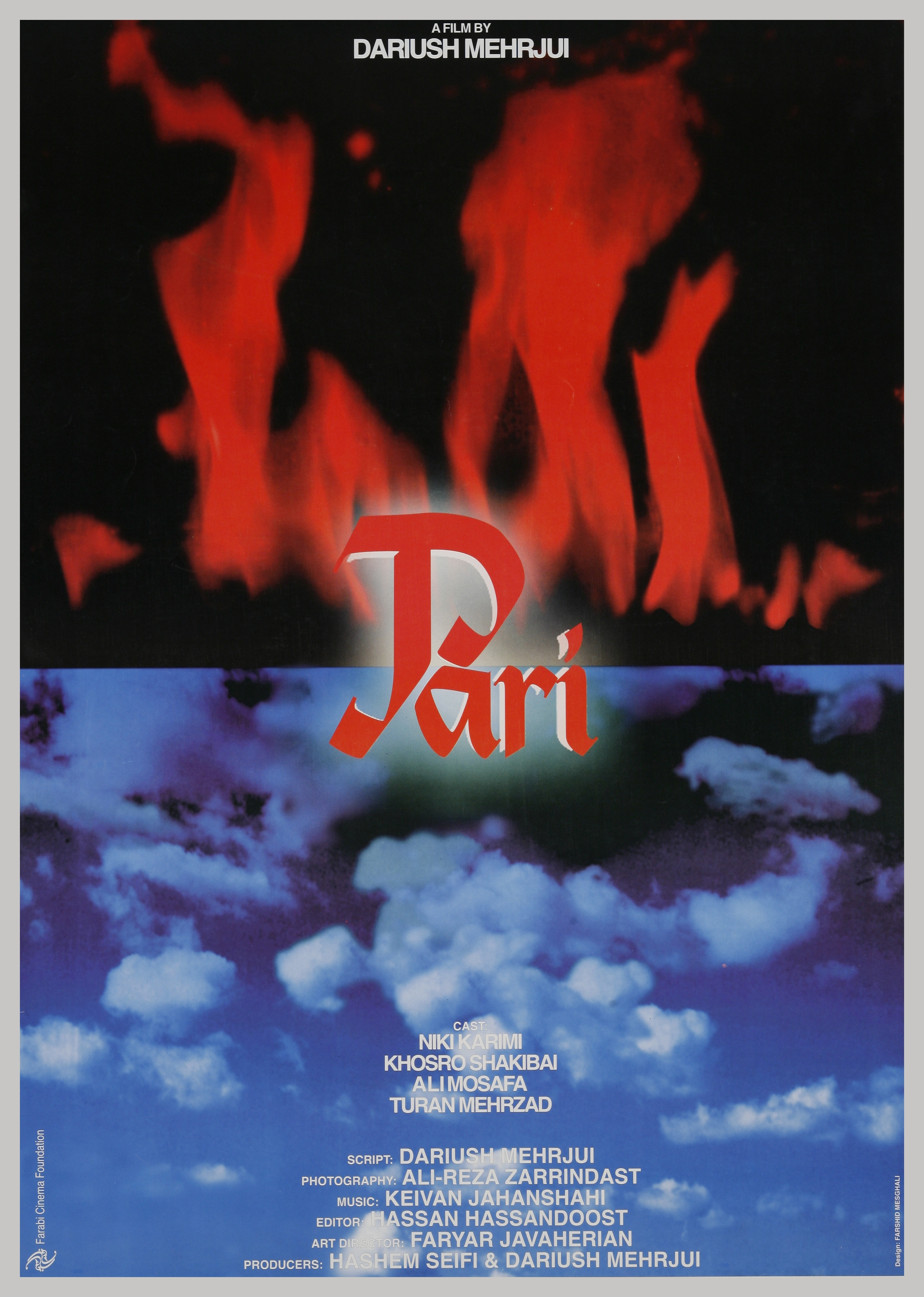
- Directed by: Dariush Mehrjui
- Written by: J.D. Salinger (novel: Franny and Zooey), Dariush Mehrjui
- Produced by: Amirhossein Sharifi
- Starring: Niki Karimi, Ali Mosaffa, Khosro Shakibai, Melika Sharifinia
- Cinematography: Ali Reza Zarrindast
- Edited by: Hassan Hassandoost
- Music by: Keivan Jahanshahi
- Release date: 1995
- Running time: 115 minuntes
- Language: Persian

Pari (Persian: پری, romanized: Parī) is a 1995 Iranian motion picture directed by Dariush Mehrjui. The film is an unauthorized "loose" adaptation of J. D. Salinger's 1961 book Franny and Zooey. Though the film could be distributed legally in Iran since the country has no official copyright relations with the United States, Salinger had his lawyers block a planned screening of the film at Lincoln Center in 1998. Mehrjui called Salinger's action "bewildering," explaining that he saw his film as "a kind of cultural exchange."

== Plot ==
Pari is a student of literature at a university in Tehran. She is a confident yet angry girl who is projecting her inner struggle by outwards aggression towards her tutor, her fiancé and her brother and she is on the verge of a nervous breakdown or a mental suicide.

An old Sufi book by the name of "solook" helps take her on a journey to find herself and discover who she really is. Her brother helps her accomplish this goal.

== See also ==
- Cinema of Iran
