= Brick and Mirror =

1964 film

- Directed by: Ebrahim Golestan
- Written by: Ebrahim Golestan
- Produced by: Ebrahim Golestan
- Starring: Zakaria Hashemi; Akbar Meshkin; Pari Saberi; Jamshid Mashayekhi; Mohammad-Ali Keshavarz; Manouchehr Farid; Parviz Fannizadeh; Jalal Moghadam; Tajolmolouk Ahmadi; Mehri Mehrnia
- Cinematography: Soleiman Minasian
- Release date: 19 January 1966
- Running time: 130 minutes
- Country: Iran
- Language: Persian

Brick and Mirror (Persian title: Khesht o Ayeneh - Persian: خشت و آینه) is a 1966 Iranian New Wave drama film directed by Ebrahim Golestan and starring Zakaria Hashemi, Akbar Meshkin, Pari Saberi, Jamshid Mashayekhi, Mohammad-Ali Keshavarz and Manouchehr Farid. In July 2018, it was selected to be screened in the Venice Classics section at the 75th Venice International Film Festival.

== Plot ==
Hashem (Zakaria Hashemi) is a taxi driver who finds a baby child in the back seat of his cab one night after he gives a ride to a young lady. He and his girlfriend, Taji (Tajolmolouk Ahmadi), try to cope with this unwanted child. Hashem insists on getting rid of the child, Taji on keeping him.
