= Iranian New Wave =

Film movement originating in Iran

- Years active: 1960s–2010s
- Location: Iran
- Influenced: Italian Neorealism, French New Wave

Iranian New Wave (Persian: موج نوی سینمای ایران, lit. 'the new wave of Iranian cinema') refers to a film movement that took shape in the late 1960s and lasted about a decade. It caught fire with Dariush Mehrjui's The Cow and Masoud Kimiai's Qeisar (both 1969). The ground had been prepared by earlier films: South of the City (1958), Night of the Hunchback (1964) and Brick and Mirror (1965), by the social-realist filmmakers Farrokh Ghaffari and Ebrahim Golestan, followed by Fereydoun Rahnema's Modernist Siavash in Perspolis (1967). While Qeisar gave rise to the modernized jaheli genre (tough-guy movies), The Cow led to the new-wave movement. Its filmmakers came from diverse class backgrounds and had different training, tastes, and styles, and the movement lacked a publication of its own. It was therefore less a cohesive movement than a filmmaking "moment", though it continued, through several of its key filmmakers, in the art cinema of the mid-1980s.

== History ==
=== Early Iranian cinema ===
Cinema in Iran began to develop in 1900, when Mozaffar ad-Din Shah Qajar was introduced to the cinematograph upon traveling to France. He ordered his chief photographer, Mirza Ibrahim Khan Akasbashi, to buy one. Visiting the Festival of Flowers in Belgium, Akasbashi turned the cinematograph toward the flower-adorned carriages, making him the first Iranian to ever film anything. Theaters were opened beginning in 1903 by Mirza Ibrahim Sahafbashi. The first film school was opened in 1930 by Russian-Armenian, immigrant Ovanes Ohanian, who had studied at The School of Cinematic Art in Moscow. He started his first cinema school 1924 after arriving in Calcutta, India: after facing many difficulties he decided to move to Iran to start the first cinema school in Tehran where he created the first full-length Iranian silent film called Haji Agha, the Cinema Actor and his second movie Abi and Rabi. After traveling to India in 1927, Abdul-Hussein Sepanta was inspired to make Persian language films, of which he ended up making four. Due to domination of the Pahlavi regime over all aspects of culture and the economy, as well as its very harsh censorship of films from 1925 to 1979, the cinema had difficulty developing in a way that reflected its own culture. In this time, Filmfarsi began which has been described as “low-quality movies for audiences who were becoming addicted to such fare, losing any taste or demand for anything different.” Film Farsi is characterized by its mimicking of the popular cinemas of Hollywood and India, and its common use of song and dance routines. Forough Farrokhzad made the short documentary film The House Is Black in 1963, and this film is considered to be a precursor to the new wave cinema. Its unflinching depictions of life in a leper colony, paired with artistically composed shots and her own poetry, made this a truly unique film. Other films such as Farrokh Ghaffari's The Night of the Hunchback (1964), Ebrahim Golestan's Brick and Mirror (1965), and Fereydoun Rahnema's Siavush in Persepolis are all considered to be precursors as well.

=== First Wave ===
The first wave of Iranian new wave cinema came about as a reaction to the popular cinema at the time that did not reflect the norms of life for Iranians or the artistic taste of the society. It began in 1969 and then ended with the beginning of the Iranian revolution in 1979. The films produced were original, artistic and political. The first films considered to be part of this movement are Davoud Mollapour's Shohare Ahoo Khanoom (1968), Masoud Kimiai's Qeysar and Dariush Mehrjui's The Cow (1969). Other films considered to be part of this movement are Nasser Taghvai's Tranquility in the Presence of Others (1969/1972) which was banned and then heavily censored upon its release, Bahram Beyzai's Downpour, and Sohrab Shahid Saless's A Simple Event (1973) and Still Life (1974).

=== Second and Third Wave ===
The factors leading to the rise of the New Wave in Iran were, in part, due to the intellectual and political movements of the time. A romantic climate was developing after the 19 August 1953 coup in the sphere of arts. Alongside this, a socially committed literature took shape in the 1950s and reached a peak in the 1960s, which many consider the golden era of contemporary Persian literature.

Iranian New Wave films shared some characteristics with the European art films of the period, in particular Italian Neorealism. However, in her article 'Real Fictions', Rose Issa argues that Iranian films have a distinctively Iranian cinematic language "that champions the poetry in everyday life and the ordinary person by blurring the boundaries between fiction and reality, feature film with documentary." She also argues that this unique approach has inspired European cinema directors to emulate this style, citing Michael Winterbottom's award-winning In This World (2002) as an homage to contemporary Iranian cinema. Issa claims that "This new, humanistic aesthetic language, determined by the film-makers' individual and national identity, rather than the forces of globalism, has a strong creative dialogue not only on homeground but with audiences around the world."

Moreover, Iranian new wave films are rich in poetry and painterly images. There is a line back from modern Iranian cinema to the ancient oral Persian storytellers and poets, via the poems of Omar Khayyam.

Features of New Wave Iranian film, in particular the works of Abbas Kiarostami, have been classified by some as postmodern.

In Close Up: Iranian Cinema, Past, Present, Future (2001), Hamid Dabashi describes modern Iranian cinema and the phenomenon of [Iranian] national cinema as a form of cultural modernity. According to Dabashi, "the visual possibility of seeing the historical person (as opposed to the eternal Qur'anic man) on screen is arguably the single most important event allowing Iranians access to modernity."

== Significant works ==
=== Precursors ===
- The House Is Black (Forough Farrokhzad, 1963)
- Shabe Quzi (The Night of the Hunchback, Farrokh Ghaffari, 1964)
- Brick and Mirror (Ebrahim Golestan, 1965)
- Siavush in Persepolis (Fereydoun Rahnema, 1967)

=== First Wave ===
- The Cow (Dariush Mehrjui, 1969)
- Qeysar (Masoud Kimiai, 1969)
- Tranquility in the Presence of Others (Nasser Taghvai, 1969/1972)
- Downpour (Bahram Beizai, 1972)
- The Mongols (Parviz Kimiavi, 1973)
- A Simple Event (Sohrab Shahid Saless, 1973)
- Still Life (Sohrab Shahid Saless, 1974)
- Chess of the Wind (Mohammad Reza Aslani, 1976)

=== Second Wave ===
- The Runner (Amir Naderi, 1985)
- Where Is the Friend's Home? (Abbas Kiarostami, 1987)
- Close-Up (Abbas Kiarostami, 1990)
- A Moment of Innocence (Mohsen Makhmalbaf, 1996)
- Taste of Cherry (Abbas Kiarostami, 1997)
- Children of Heaven (Majid Majidi, 1997)
- The Color of Paradise (Majid Majidi, 1999)

=== Third Wave ===
- A Time for Drunken Horses (Bahman Ghobadi, 2000)
- Blackboards (Samira Makhmalbaf, 2000)
- Deep Breath (Parviz Shahbazi, 2003)
- Crimson Gold (Jafar Panahi, 2003)
- Boutique (Hamid Nematollah, 2004)
- About Elly (Asghar Farhadi, 2009)
- Penniless (Hamid Nematollah, 2009)
- The Bright Day (Hossein Shahabi, 2013)
- No One Knows About Persian Cats (Bahman Ghobadi, 2009)
- A Separation (Asghar Farhadi, 2011)

== Major figures ==
Some major figures of the Iranian new wave include:

- Bahram Beizai
- Asghar Farhadi
- Manouchehr Farid (actor)
- Forough Farrokhzad
- Farrokh Ghaffari
- Bahman Ghobadi
- Ebrahim Golestan
- Abbas Kiarostami
- Masoud Kimiai
- Parviz Kimiavi
- Majid Majidi
- Mohsen Makhmalbaf
- Samira Makhmalbaf
- Dariush Mehrjui
- Amir Naderi
- Jafar Panahi
- Sohrab Shahid Saless
- Hossein Shahabi
- Parviz Shahbazi
- Nasser Taghvai

== See also ==
- Cinema of the world
- A Separation - the first Iranian film to win the Academy Award for Best Foreign Language Film
- The Salesman - the second Iranian film to win the same award
