= Mr. Naive =

1971 Iranian film by Dariush Mehrjui

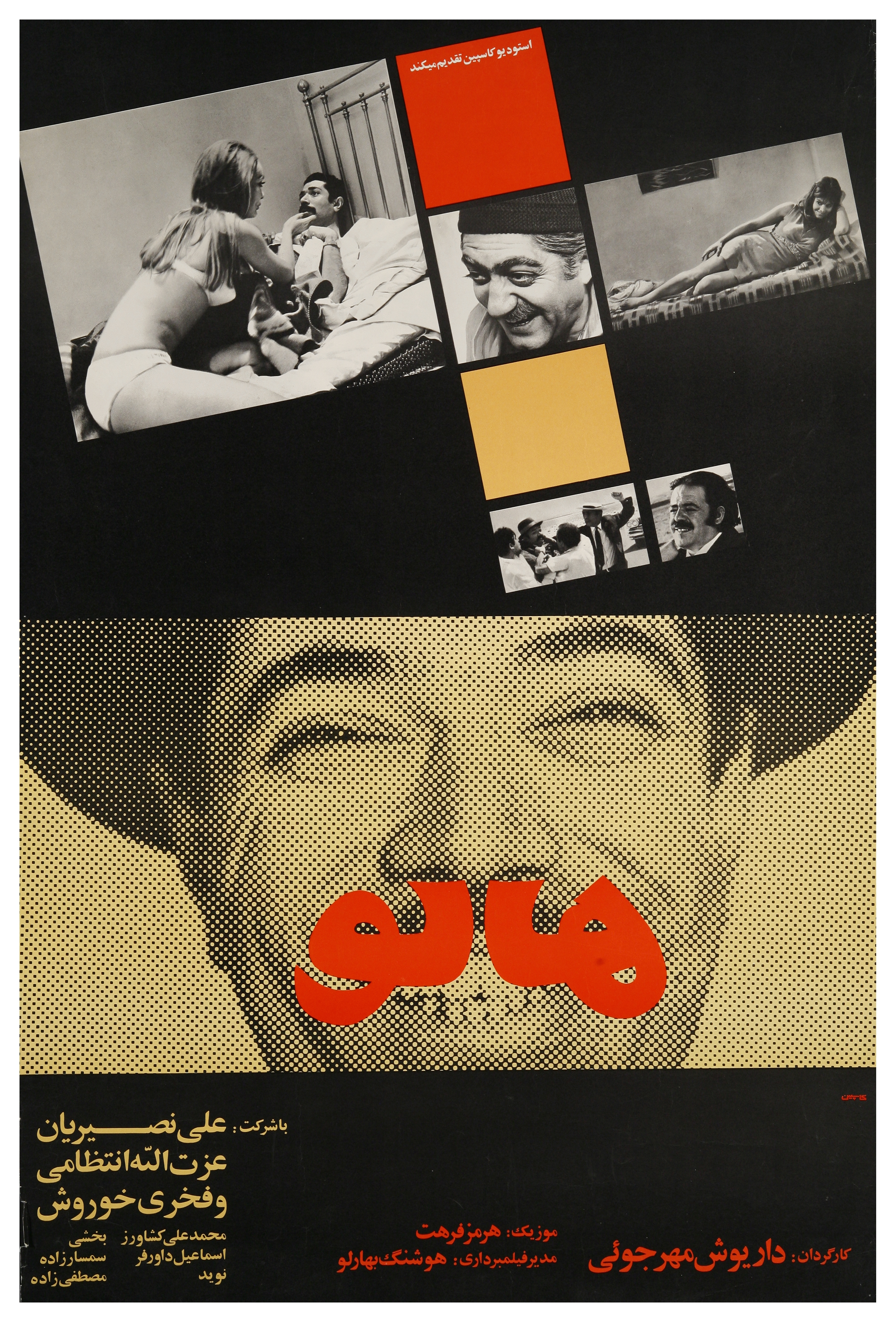
- Film poster
- Directed by: Dariush Mehrjui
- Written by: Ali Nassirian; Dariush Mehrjui
- Starring: Ali Nassirian; Ezzatolah Entezami; Enayat Bakhshi
- Cinematography: Houshang Baharlou
- Release date: 9 September 1970
- Country: Iran
- Language: Persian

Mr. Naive (Persian: آقای هالو, Aghaye Halou, also Romanized as Āghā-ye Hālū, also released as Mr. Gullible) is a 1970 Iranian drama film directed by Dariush Mehrjui. It was entered into the 7th Moscow International Film Festival.

== Plot ==
Mr. Naive tells the tale of Halou, an innocent Iranian villager who moves to the busy metropolis of Tehran in search of a suitable spouse.

== Cast ==
- Ali Nassirian
- Ezzatolah Entezami
- Fakhri Khorvash
- Mohamad Ali Keshavarz
- Enayat Bakhshi
