= Pari Saberi =

Iranian director (1932–2024)

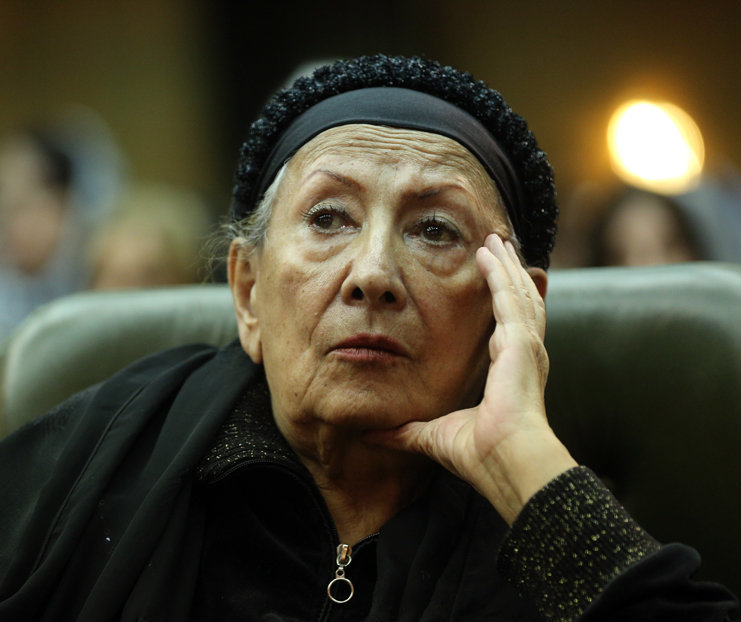
- Saberi in 2018
- Born: 21 March 1932; Kerman, Imperial State of Iran
- Died: 10 September 2024 (aged 92); Iran
- Occupations: Writer, filmmaker
- Children: 2
- Writing career
- Notable awards: Ordre des Arts et des Lettres

Pari Saberi (Persian: پری صابری; 21 March 1932 – 10 September 2024) was an Iranian theatre director and Knight of the French Ordre des Arts et des Lettres, awarded by French President Jacques Chirac.

== Biography ==
Saberi was born on 21 March 1932, to a cultured family in the southeastern Iranian city of Kerman and was sent to Paris at the age of 12 to continue her education. She graduated from the Vaugirard Cinematography College in France. She has staged many plays based on Persian classical literature, including Rostam and Sohrab. Some of her plays like the Flying Shams and the Legend of Siavash have been seen by tens of thousands in Iran and abroad. The maestro was a close friend and companion of prominent Iranian modernist poet Forough Farrokhzad and has made a movie about her. Saberi has also written and translated numerous books to serve as a bridge between the Persian and Western litterateur. She was one of the most decorated directors in Iran who received numerous prestigious awards, including the UNICEF’s Avicenna (Ibn Sina) prize in 2003, and the French Chevalier de l’Ordre des Arts et des Lettres in 2004. The avid artist showed a strong passion for mysticism, poetry, Iranian sagas, music, dance and theater during her fruitful career and has been a source of inspiration for many enthusiasts.

Saberi died on 10 September 2024, at the age of 92.

== Filmography ==
- Adobe and Mirror (1964)

== Awards ==
- French Chevalier de l'Ordre des Arts et des Lettres (2004)
