= Tangna =

1973 Iranian film

Tangna is a 1973 Iranian film directed by Amir Naderi. It was Naderi's second movie. The actors were Saeed Rad, Noori Kasrai, Enayat Bakhshi, Mohammad Eskandari and Mehri Vadadian.

== Plot ==
Ali Khoshdast is involved in a fight and accidentally kills a man. After a desperate flight from the revenge-seeking relatives of the victim, he takes refuge with his fiancée.
