= Jean Chevalier =

French writer, philosopher, and theologian

Jean Chevalier (1906–1993) was a French writer, philosopher, and theologian, best known for his co-authorship of the Dictionnaire des symboles (Dictionary of Symbols), first printed in 1969 by publisher Éditions Robert Laffont.

Dictionary of Symbols is an encyclopedic work of cultural anthropology, co-written with the French poet and Amazonian explorer Alain Gheerbrant, devoted to the symbolism of myths, dreams, habits, gestures, shapes, figures, colors and numbers found in mythology and folklore. It contains over 1,600 articles and has seen nineteen reprints between 1982 and 1997. It has been republished on a worldwide basis by Penguin Books and others.

Up to 1964, Chevalier worked at UNESCO as Director of the Bureau of Relations for Member States before resigning to pursue writing and research.

== Works ==
- L'organisation du travail (Work organization), 1937.
- Humanisme Chrétien (Christian Humanism), 1940.
- La théorie augustinienne des relations trinitaires (Augustinian theory of trinitarian relations), 1940.
- S. Augustin et la pensée grecque (S. Augustine and the Greek thought), 1940.
- Organisation: du travail, Volume 2 (Organization: Work Organization, Volume 2), 1943.
- La communauté humaine selon l'esprit chrétien – coauthor Emile Marmy (The human community according to the Christian spirit), 1944.
- Doctrines économiques (Economic doctrines), 1945.
- La cité romaine (The Roman city), 1948.
- Administration de l'entreprise (Business Administration), 1957.
- Histoire de la pensée (History of the Thought), 1958.
- Textes sacrés traditions et œuvres d'art de toutes les religions (Sacred texts and art traditions of all religions), 1967.
- Dictionnaire des symboles – coauthor Alain Gheerbrant (Dictionary of Symbols), 1969.
- La politique du Vatican (Vatican politics), 1969.
- Les religions (Religions), 1972.
- A à Che and Alain Gheerbrant (A to C – Volume 1 of Dictionnaire des symboles), 1973.
- Che à G. and Alain Gheerbrant (C to G – Volume 2 of Dictionnaire des symboles), 1973.
- H à Pie and Alain Gheerbrant (H to P – Volume 3 of Dictionnaire des symboles), 1974.
- Pie à Z. and Alain Gheerbrant (P to Z – Volume 4 of Dictionnaire des symboles), 1974.
- Le soufisme or, L'ivresse de Dieu dans la tradition de l'islam (Sufism or The intoxication of God in the tradition of Islam), 1974.
- Les royaumes celtiques – coauthors Myles Dillon, Nora Kershaw Chadwick (The Celtic kingdoms), 1979.
- Introduction au symbolisme (Introduction to Symbolism), 1986.
- Une dynamique de la paix (The dynamics of peace), 1986.
- Les voies de l'au-delà (The ways of the afterlife), 1994.
