= Chess of the Wind =

1976 Iranian film by Mohammad Reza Aslani

- 2021 French theatrical release poster
- Directed by: Mohammad Reza Aslani
- Written by: Mohammad Reza Aslani
- Produced by: Bahman Farmanara
- Starring: Fakhri Khorvash; Mohamad Ali Keshavarz; Akbar Zanjanpour; Shohreh Aghdashloo
- Cinematography: Houshang Baharloo
- Edited by: Abbas Ganjavi
- Music by: Sheida Gharachedaghi
- Distributed by: Janus Films (international)
- Release date: November 1976 (Tehran)
- Running time: 99 minutes
- Country: Iran
- Language: Persian

Chess of the Wind (Persian: شطرنج باد, romanized: Shatranj-e Baad), also titled The Chess Game of the Wind, is a 1976 Iranian drama film written and directed by Mohammad Reza Aslani. The film was screened only once before the 1979 revolution in Iran and was roundly condemned by film critics for its violence and homosexual themes, leading to an official ban by the Iranian government. The negative and all prints were thought to have been destroyed. The film negative was rediscovered by the director's children 38 years later in 2014, for sale in a Tehran junk shop. After an extensive restoration the film was re-released in 2020 to wide acclaim.

== Plot ==
In an aristocratic family, the matriarch, Khanom Bozorg, dies. Her daughter Aghdas, who uses a wheelchair, is left to mourn her in her large house (Moshir ad-Dowleh Mansion) alongside her mother's widower, Hadji Amoo, and his two nephews, Ramezan and Shaban. Ramezan is engaged to Aghdas, but it becomes apparent that he is only interested in her for her money. Aghdas is looked after by a maid, Kanizak, who also cultivates a friendship with Shaban. Throughout the film, intercut scenes of washerwomen gossiping fill in the details of Aghdas and Hadji Amoo's history.

Both Aghdas and Hadji Amoo believe they are entitled to inherit Khanom Bozorg's house, and one day Aghdas and Kanizak enter Hadji Amoo's room and burn the deeds to the house with his name on them. After several confrontations between stepfather and stepdaughter, Aghdas plans to kill Hadji Amoo and obliquely lets Ramezan know of her plan. As Hadji Amoo is praying in his room, Aghdas is wheeled in by Kanizak and strikes him on the head with a silver flail. He falls to the ground and Kanizak and Ramezan drag him to the cellar, where they store the body in a bottomless jar, intending to return later and dissolve it in nitric acid on Aghdas's orders.

A few days later, two creditors of Hadji Amoo arrive at the house with a police commissar, trying to collect a debt he owed them. Aghdas claims not to have seen Hadji Amoo for several days, but the commissar replies that he ran into him on the street more recently. Shocked, Aghdas is unable to respond, and Kanizak and Ramezan take the men down to the cellar, where they examine the jars without finding the body and then leave.

Aghdas becomes increasingly paranoid about whether Hadji Amoo is really dead or not; when a travelling musical troupe claim to have met him in public, she panics and falls ill. Kanizak persuades Aghdas to let her leave the house for a couple of days to visit a nearby holy site. Alone in her room at night, Aghdas hears laughter from the cellar. Taking an antique pistol from her drawer, Aghdas drags herself down the stairs to the basement, where she discovers Hadji Amoo and Kanizak in the bath. Shooting Hadji Amoo, she succumbs to a heart attack.

Kanizak and Shaban plan to live off the inheritance together, and it is implied that they had planned this all along, with Kanizak helping Ramezan to fake Hadji Amoo's death until they could safely dispatch him together. However, when Kanizak realises that Shaban does not intend to marry her, the two begin to argue upstairs. Coming across the bodies in the cellar, Ramezan is enraged at Shaban's betrayal, and runs upstairs, shooting him dead.

In the final scene of the film, Kanizak departs the mansion, leaving behind only a young boy and Aghdas's elderly nanny. The camera pans across the city outside the walls of the house.

== Cast ==
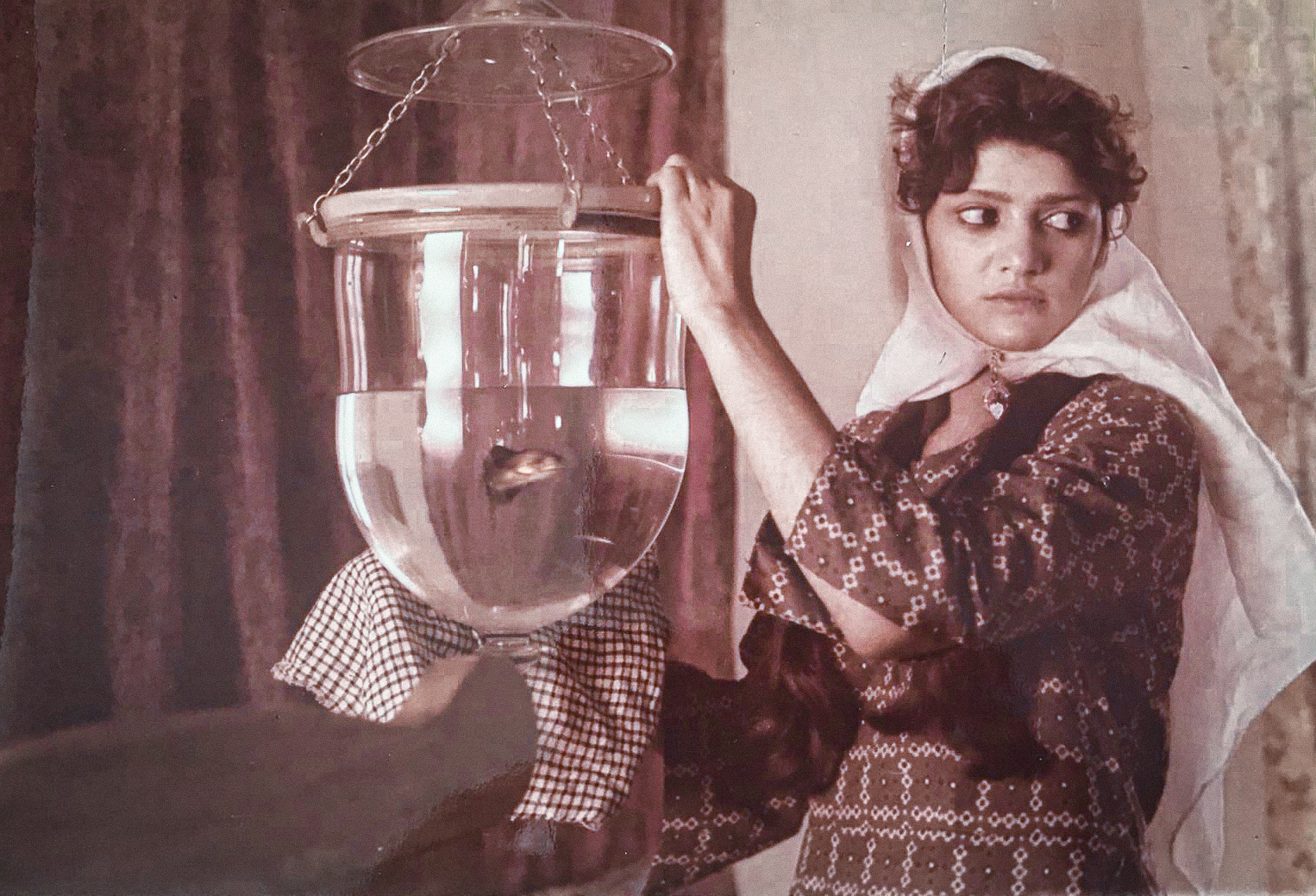
Shohreh Aghdashloo in Chess of the Wind.

- Fakhri Khorvash as Aghdas
- Mohamad Ali Keshavarz as Hadji Amoo
- Shohreh Aghdashloo as Kanizak, the maid
- Akbar Zanjanpour as Ramezan
- Shahram Golchin as Shaban
- Hamid Taati as the commissar
- Aghajan Rafii as the doctor
- Annik Shefrazian as the nanny
- Majid Habibpur
- Javad Javadi
- Javad Rajavar
- Ali Ahmadi

== Inspiration and related works ==
Aslani cited Johannes Vermeer as an inspiration for daytime scenes and Georges de La Tour as inspiration for the nighttime scenes. Georges de La Tour's use of central light sources in his paintings, as well as his willingness to have portions of the painting either over- or under-exposed, intrigued him. Aslani also referenced Barry Lyndon's approach to light, but stressed that he and Kubrick are different directors with different attitudes. Chess of the Wind includes film tinting reminiscent of some silent films.

== Reception ==
Hossein Eidizadeh wrote in Lola Journal:

From marvelous camera movements, to every tiny prop purposefully set in the corners of the frame. You understand how important mise en scène is for this director who loves Max Ophüls. The story is very simple: the decadence of a family in the Qajar dynasty of Iran. Aslani is one of the most neglected Iranian filmmakers – not only outside Iran, but also in his homeland. A prolific documentarist who has made only two fiction films (the second, Green Fire [2008], was bashed by critics, which is hardly surprising), Aslani is a filmmaker who tells the most Iranian stories with the elegant technique of Ophüls or Visconti. His movies are eloquent, hard to digest. However, it takes only 15 minutes to succumb to The Chess Game of the Wind. With the first dinner gathering of the family of the deceased mother (crippled daughter, her step father, her uncle, her maid), through mise en scène, the power dynamic of the story unfolds. You grasp that this story of fighting over a great deal of money is only a pretext for deeper social and cultural comment. The film foretells the Iranian Revolution and remains riveting – not only because of its story and hidden layers, but also because it is one of the rarest Iranian films that, while in debt to German Expressionism and Visconti’s operatic, narrative tools, is rooted in Iranian painting and frame composition. That’s why the film is truly the Holy Grail of Iranian cinephiles – and a mesmerising one."

On the review aggregator website Rotten Tomatoes, 100% of 8 critics' reviews are positive. Metacritic, which uses a weighted average, assigned the film a score of 94 out of 100, based on 4 critics, indicating "universal acclaim".

== Rediscovery ==
The original negatives were presumed lost after the film's prohibition in Iran. In 2014, 38 years after its release, the film was rediscovered. After several years of searching Iranian archives and film laboratories, the director's daughter and son recovered the original film negative. The elements were found by accident in a Tehran junk shop, which held a set of film cans being sold as decoration. Because the film was still subject to a ban, the negative was smuggled out of Iran and held at a secret location in Paris, where it awaited restoration. Over the next six years the film was restored in collaboration with its original director and cinematographer. Funding was provided by Western film foundations.

Reception was positive after the restored and regraded film was screened in 2020. Robin Baker, head curator of the BFI National Archive said it will "impact" the "world film canon". Baker praised its "ambition", finding it "shocking" and unique in relation to film as well as Iranian culture.

As of 2021, Janus Films currently owns the North American distribution rights to the film.

The film was released on Blu-ray and DVD by The Criterion Collection in September 2022 as part of Martin Scorsese’s World Cinema Project series.

== See also ==
- 2020 Cannes Film Festival
