= Alain Gheerbrant =

French writer, editor, poet and explorer

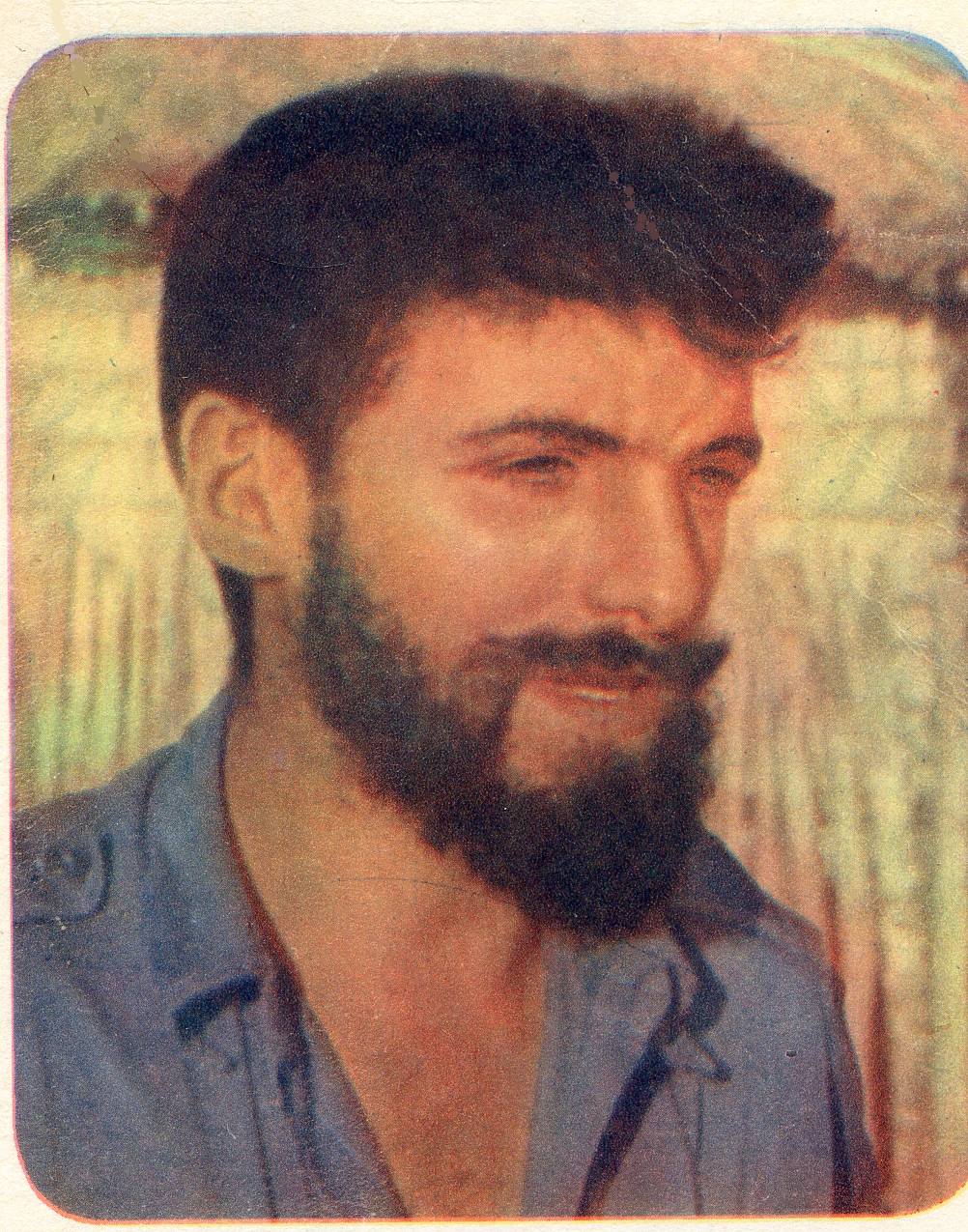
- Born: 27 December 1920; Paris, France
- Died: 21 February 2013 (aged 92); Paris, France
- Education: Lycée Saint-Jean-de-Passy
- Occupations: Writer, poet, editor, explorer

Alain Gheerbrant (27 December 1920 – 21 February 2013) was a French writer, editor, poet and explorer, noted for his expedition in the basins of Amazonian rivers.

== Career ==
Alain Gheerbrant was the first avant-garde publisher, founder of the publishing house K Éditeur, which published works by Antonin Artaud, Benjamin Péret, Georges Bataille, and Aimé Césaire. For the second edition of Story of the Eye by Bataille, Gheerbrant introduced Bataille to the German artist Hans Bellmer in May 1946: "It was tempting," says Gheerbrant, "to create a dialogue between a papist and a Lutheran on their common obsession. One's Nordic and surgical precision was made to give shape to the nocturnal and romantic imaginations of the other. The project took their common approval from the outset." The book was entirely rewritten by Bataille himself.

From 1948 to 1950, Alain Gheerbrant led the Orinoco-Amazon expedition. He travelled through the basins of both rivers for two years and wrote of his travels in L'Expédition Orénoque-Amazone (The Orinoco-Amazon Expedition) (1952). He is considered the first Westerner to make peaceful contact with the Yanomami Indians and also the first to cross the Parima Mountains as he did between 1948 and 1950. In 1952, he directed a documentary film called Des hommes qu'on appelle sauvages.(Men We Call Savages)

He produced numerous articles from all over the world and published Dictionnaire des symboles (Dictionary of Symbols)in 1982, a collaborative work with Jean Chevalier, an encyclopaedia of cultural anthropology about the symbolism of myths and folklore, which was republished nineteen times between 1982 and 1997. He authored an illustrated pocket book for the "Découvertes Gallimard" collection, titled L'Amazone, un géant blessé (The Amazon, A Wounded Giant) (1988), which has been translated into eleven languages including English. In 1995, he released his memoir entitled La Transversale (The Transverse).

== Selected bibliography ==
- L'expédition Orénoque-Amazone (1948–1950), « Hors série Connaissance ». Éditions Gallimard, 1952
- Congo noir et blanc, « Hors série Connaissance ». Éditions Gallimard, 1956
- The Incas, Orion Press, 1961
- Journey to the Far Amazon: An Expedition Into Unknown Territory, Simon & Schuster, 1964
- The Rebel Church in Latin America, Penguin Books, 1974 (Pelican Latin American Library)
- Collab. with Jean Chevalier, Dictionnaire des symboles, Éditions Robert Laffont, 1982
  - Dictionary of Symbols, Penguin Books, 1996
- L'Amazone, un géant blessé, collection « Découvertes Gallimard » (nº 40), série Histoire. Éditions Gallimard, 1988 (new edition in 2005)
  - US edition – The Amazon: Past, Present, and Future, "Abrams Discoveries" series. Harry N. Abrams, 1992
  - UK edition – The Amazon: Past, Present and Future, 'New Horizons' series. Thames & Hudson, 1992
- La Transversale, Actes Sud, 1998
