= Nozar Azadi =

Iranian comedian and actor (1938–2021)

- نوذر آزادی
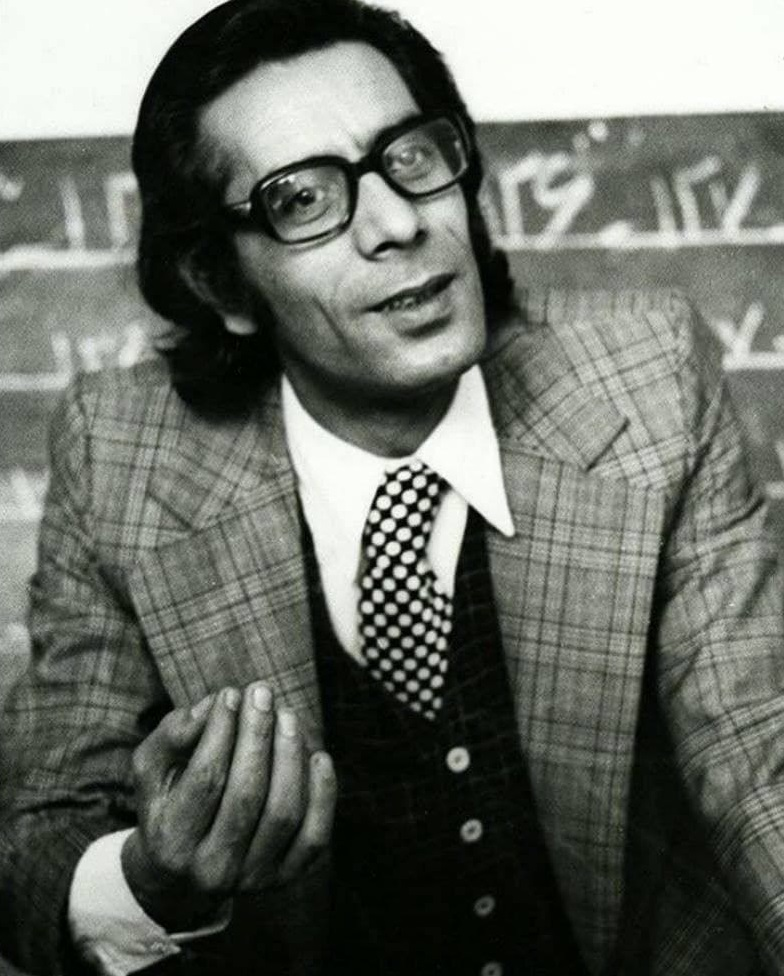
- Born: Nozar Azadi; 18 February 1939; Kermanshah, Iran
- Died: 26 February 2021 (aged 82); Bremen, Germany
- Education: Tehran University of Art
- Occupations: Actor, writer, painter, poet,
- Years active: 1954–1979
- Spouse: Parvin Dowlatshahi
- Children: Parastoo Azadi, Sabrina Azadi, Payam Azadi
- Website: www.nozarazadi.com

Nozar Azadi (Persian: نوذر آزادی; 26 February 2021) was an Iranian comedian and actor who was famous in Iran in the 1970s, mostly because of his role in TV series such as Italia, Italia, Kaf show, and Okhtapus.

== Career ==
He was born in Kermanshah, Iran to a Kurdish family, in February 18, 1939. Azadi appeared in many shows, television series and films in the Iranian era prior to the 1979 Islamic Revolution.

Azadi starred in many films of Samad and Leila, the Kaf Show directed by Parviz Sayad, and his own television series Italia Italia, playing the character Ghatebeh. Ghatebeh played in many shows where he impersonated a Kermanshahi man who was a con man by nature, very slick and a great communicator/womanizer. Ghatebeh had a distinguished Kermanshahi accent that to this day, 40 years later, people of Iran still remember with amusement.

In 1971, Azadi performed in Peter Brook's production of Orghast in Persepolis, which was part of the 2,500 year celebration of the Persian Empire.

Azadi fled from Iran to Germany, where he lived in Bremen for 20 years, and then moved to the United States. He made no more films, but took up painting.

In 2010, Azadi exhibited his paintings at the Seyhoun Gallery in Hollywood, California.

Nozar Azadi died on February 26, 2021 at the age of 82 in Bremen.

== Filmography ==
- Jew's Harp, 1975
- Mozaffar, 1974
- Samad goes to School, 1973 (as Director)
- Suitor, 1972
- Samad and Solomon, 1971
