= Fereydoun Rahnema =

Iranian film director and poet (1930–75)

- فریدون رهنما
- Born: May 23, 1930; Tehran, Iran
- Died: August 7, 1975 (aged 45); Tehran, Iran

Fereydoun Rahnema (Persian: فریدون رهنما; May 23, 1930 – August 7,1975) was an Iranian film director and poet. He is most known for his 1960 short film, Takht-e Jamshid (Persepolis), and his feature film, Siavash dar Takht-e Jamshid (Siavash in Persepolis) in 1965. Although none of his films saw a theatrical release, they were highly influential within the Iranian New Wave movement. He also served as the director of Iran Zamin from 1966 to 1975.

Rahnema studied film in Paris, France. He began work on Siavash dar Takht-e Jamshid with funding from a number of acquaintances. Shot in studio and on location in the ruins of Persepolis, the film is based on Ferdowsi's poetic epic Shahnameh. It tells the story of Crown Prince Siâvash who leaves his homeland in order to avoid dishonoring his father Shah Kay Kāvus. He marries the daughter of the local king Afrasiab, but is betrayed and murdered. The film is notable for its then-uncommon temporal experimentation with footage of tourists trekking through the ruins of Persepolis interspersed with the older setting.

== Filmography ==
- 1960 "Takht-e Jamshid" (Persepolis)
- 1965 "Siavash dar Takht-e Jamshid" (Siavash in Persepolis)
- 1973 Pesar-e Iran az Madarash Bi ettela' Ast (Iran's Son is Unaware of His Mother)

== Siavash at Persepolis ==
Siyavosh at Persepolis tells the story of the Crown Prince of Iran, Siyavosh, who after a falling-out with his father leaves Iran and settles in Turan. There he marries the daughter of King Afrasyab and is killed in a plot by the king's scheming and jealous son. The film combines this ancient story with documentary-style scenes of foreign tourists visiting the ruins of Persepolis in the present, creating a work in which past, future, present, legend, theater and a myriad of filmic forms are combined in a dense intertextuality that was new to Iranian cinema.
