= Mohammad-Ali Keshavarz =

Iranian actor (1930–2020)

- محمدعلی کشاورز
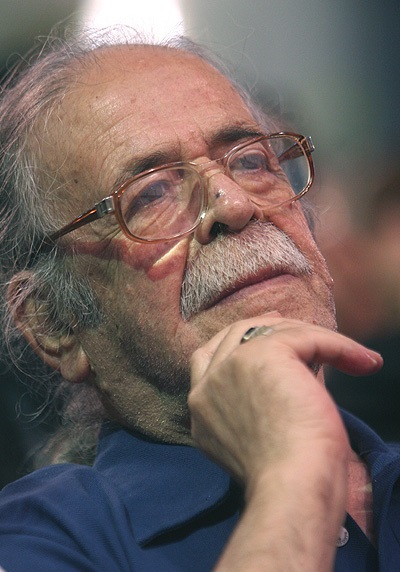
- Keshavarz in 2007
- Born: April 15, 1930; Isfahan, Iran
- Died: June 14, 2020 (aged 90); Tehran, Iran
- Occupation: Actor
- Years active: 1960–2008
- Spouse: Mona Taheri (div. 1973)
- Children: Neli Keshavarz
- Awards: Order of Culture and Art (1st Class)

Mohamad-Ali Keshavarz (Persian: محمدعلی کشاورز; April 15, 1930 – June 14, 2020) was an Iranian actor. Keshavarz, Ali Nasirian, Ezatollah Entezami, Jamshid Mashayekhi, and Davoud Rashidi are known as "the five most important actors in the history of Iranian cinema" because of their influence.

== Early life ==
He was born on 15 April 1930 in Sichan (neighbourhood), Isfahan. He was the second child of the family of Keshavarz, an artificer family.

== Career ==
Mohammad Ali Keshavarz graduated from Art School for Acting. He started stage acting in 1960 and began film acting with Night of Hunchback (1964, Farrokh Ghaffari). He was one of the most experienced and prominent actors of Iranian cinema. He has also appeared in a few television series.

== Personal life ==
He was divorced and had one daughter who lives in Austria. Keshavarz was hospitalized in August 2011 after a heart attack. He died on June 14, 2020, in Atieh Hospital in Tehran at the age of 90 following a long illness.

== Selected filmography ==
Film
Year	Title	Role	Notes
2010	Ali Akbar Moalem Damghani		
1998	Legion		
1997	Komiteh mojazat	Shaban ostekhani	
1996	The Gazelle	Ghazaal's grandfather	
1995	The Fateful Day		
1994	A Man, a Bear	Kamali	
1994	Through the Olive Trees	Film director	
1992	Nassereddin Shah	Farrash bashi	
1992	Khosoof	Fattah	
1992	Del Shodegan	Mirza Mahmoud	
1992	Dear Wednesday		
1991	Mother		
1991	Jostojoo dar jazireh		
1991	Aghay-e bakhshdar		
1990	The Rose		
1989	Foreign Currency		
1989	The Searcher		
1987	Jamil		
1985	Tael		
1985	Mardi ke moosh shod!		
1985	Mirza Norooz's Shoes	Mirza Norouz	
1985	Jafar Khan Is Back from the West	Khan Daei	
1984	Kamalolmolk		
1982	The imperilled		
1981	Gerdab		
1980	Zemzeme-ye mohabbat		
1978	Caravans	Shakkur	
1978	Dust-dwellers		
1977	The Condemned		
1976	Vaghti ke aseman beshkafad		
1976	The Chess Game of the Wind		
1976	Sham-e akhar		
1976	The Desert of the Tartars		
1973	Ghesseye mahan		
1972	Downpour	Nazem	
1972	Sadegh Korde		
1964	Adobe and Mirror		
1964	Shabe ghuzi	Jamal	

TV
Year	Title	Role	Notes
1993	Pedar Salar	Asadollah Vaezian	
1983	Sarbedaran	Khaje Ghosheyri	
1978–1987	Hezar Dastan	Shaban Ostekhani (Shaban Jafari)	
1976	My Uncle Napoleon	Sarhang	
1970	Mr. Naive		
