= Dariush Mehrjui =

Iranian filmmaker (1939–2023)

- داریوش مهرجویی
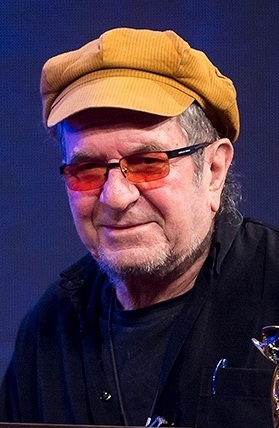
- Mehrjui in 2018
- Born: 8 December 1939; Tehran, Iran
- Died: 14 October 2023 (aged 83); Karaj, Iran
- Cause of death: Murder (stab wounds)
- Education: University of California, Los Angeles (UCLA)
- Occupations: Filmmaker, screenwriter
- Years active: 1966–2023
- Spouses: Faryar Javaherian (divorced); Vahideh Mohammadifar (died 2023)
- Children: 3

Dariush Mehrjui (Persian: داریوش مهرجویی; 8 December 1939 – 14 October 2023) was an Iranian filmmaker, screenwriter, and a member of the Iranian Academy of the Arts.

Mehrjui was a founding member of the Iranian New Wave movement of the early 1970s, which also included directors Masoud Kimiai and Nasser Taqvai. His second film, The Cow (1969), is considered to be the first film of this movement. Most of his films are inspired by literature and adapted from Iranian and foreign novels and plays.

On 14 October 2023, Mehrjui and his wife, Vahideh Mohammadifar, were found stabbed to death in their home in the city of Karaj, near Tehran.

== Early life and education ==
Dariush Mehrjui was born on 8 December 1939 to a middle-class family in Tehran. He showed interest in painting miniatures, music, and playing santoor and piano. He spent a lot of time going to the movies, particularly American films which were un-dubbed and inter-spliced with explanatory title cards that explained the plot throughout the films. At this time Mehrjui started to learn English so as to better enjoy the films. The film that had the strongest impact on him as a child was Vittorio De Sica's Bicycle Thieves. At the age of 12, Mehrjui built a 35 mm projector, rented two-reel films and began selling tickets to his neighborhood friends. Although raised in a religious household, Mehrjui said that, at the age of 15, "The face of God gradually became a little hazy for me, and I lost my faith."

In 1959, Mehrjui moved to the United States to study at University of California, Los Angeles' (UCLA) Department of Cinema. One of his teachers there was Jean Renoir, whom Mehrjui credited with teaching him how to work with actors. Mehrjui was dissatisfied with the film program due to its emphasis on the technical aspects of film and the quality of most of the teachers. Mehrjui said of his educators, "They wouldn't teach you anything very significant... because the teachers were the kind of people who had not been able to make it in Hollywood themselves... [and would] bring the rotten atmosphere of Hollywood to the class and impose it on us." He switched his major to philosophy and graduated from UCLA in 1964.

Mehrjui started his own literary magazine in 1964, Pars Review. The magazine's intention was to bring contemporary Persian literature to western readers. During this time he wrote his first script with the intention of filming it in Iran. He moved back to Tehran in 1965, and found employment as a journalist and screenwriter.

From 1966 to 1968 he was a teacher at Tehran's Center for Foreign Language Studies, where he taught classes in literature and English language. He also gave lectures on films and literature at the Center for Audiovisual Studies through the University of Tehran.

== Career ==
=== Early film career 1966–1972 ===
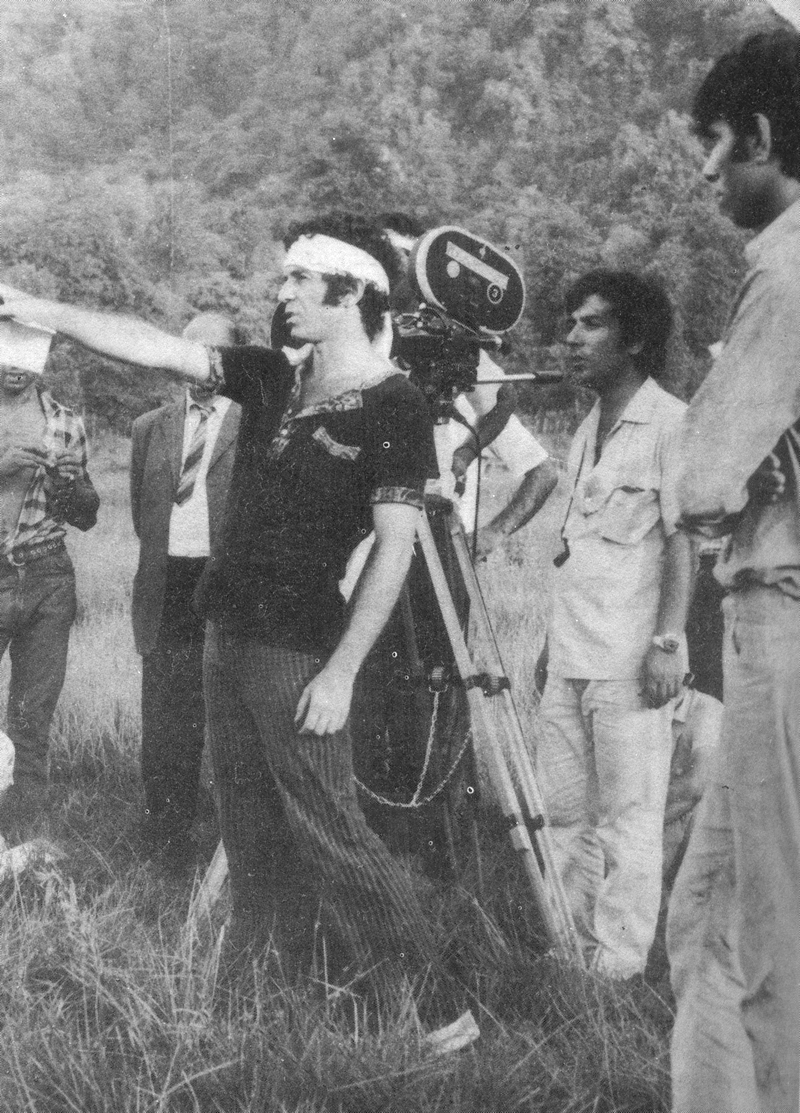
Mehrjui on set of The Postman (1971)

Mehrjui made his debut in 1966 with Diamond 33, a big budget parody of the James Bond film series. The film was not financially successful. But his second feature film, Gaav (The Cow), brought him national and international recognition. The film Gaav, a symbolic drama, is about a simple villager and his nearly mythical attachment to his cow.

The film is adapted from a short story by renowned Iranian literary figure Gholamhossein Sa'edi. Sa'edi was a friend of Mehrjui and suggested the idea to him when Mehrjui was looking for a suitable second film, and they collaborated on the script. Through Sa'edi, Mehrjui met the actors Ezzatolah Entezami and Ali Nassirian, who were performing in one of Sa'edi's plays. Mehrjui would work with Entezami and Nassirian throughout his career. The film's score was composed by musician Hormoz Farhat. The film was completed in 1969.

In the film, Entezami stars as Masht Hassan, a peasant in an isolated village in southern Iran. Hassan has a close relationship with his cow, which is his only possession (Mehrjui said that Entezami even resembled a cow in the film). When other people from Hassan's village discover that the cow has been mysteriously killed, they decide to bury the cow and tell Hassan that it has run away. While in mourning for the cow, Hassan goes to the barn where it was kept and begins to assume the cow's identity. When his friends attempt to take him to a hospital, Hassan commits suicide.

Gaav was banned for over a year by the Ministry of Culture and Arts, despite being one of the first two films in Iran to receive government funding. This was most likely due to Sa'edi being a controversial figure in Iran. His work was highly critical of the Pahlavi government, and he had been arrested sixteen times. When it was finally released in 1970, it was highly praised and won an award at the Ministry of Culture's film festival, but it was still denied an export permit. In 1971, the film was smuggled out of Iran and submitted to the Venice Film Festival where, without programming or subtitles, it became the largest event of that year's festival. It won the International Critics Award at Venice, and later that year, Entezami won the Best Actor Award at the Chicago International Film Festival.

Along with Masoud Kimiai's Qeysar and Nasser Taqvai's Tranquility in the Presence of Others, the film Gaav initiated the Iranian New Wave movement and is considered a turning point in the history of Iranian cinema. The public received it with great enthusiasm, despite the fact that it had ignored all the traditional elements of box office attraction. It was screened internationally and received high praise from many film critics. Several of Iran's prominent actors (Entezami, Nassirian, Jamshid Mashayekhi, and Jafar Vali) played roles in the film.

While waiting for Gaav to be released and gaining international recognition, Mehrjui was busy directing two more films. In 1970 he shot Agha-ye Hallou (Mr. Naive), a comedy which starred and was written by Ali Nassirian. Mehrjui had said that, "After all the censorship problems with Gaav, [he] wanted to do a no-problem film." The film also starred Fakhri Khorvash and Entezami.

In the film, Nassirian plays a simple, naive villager who goes to Tehran to find a wife. While in the big city he is treated roughly and constantly fooled by local hustlers and con artists. When he goes into a dress shop to purchase a wedding gown, he meets a beautiful young woman (Fakhri Khorvash) and proposes to her. The young woman turns out to be a prostitute who rejects him and takes his money, spending him back to his village empty handed but more world-wise.

Agha-ye Hallou was screened at the Sepas Film Festival in Tehran in 1971 where it won awards for Best Film and Best Director. Later that year it was screened at the 7th Moscow International Film Festival. It was a commercial success in Iran.

After finishing Agha-ye Hallou in 1970, Mehrjui traveled to Berkeley, California and began writing an adaptation of Georg Büchner's Woyzeck for a modern-day Iranian setting. He went back to Iran later in 1970 to shoot Postchi (The Postman), which starred Nassirian, Entezami and Jaleh Sam.

In the film, Nassirian plays Taghi, a miserable civil servant whose life spirals into chaos. He spends his days as an unhappy mail carrier and has two night jobs in order to pay his debts. His misery has caused impotence and he is experimented upon by an amateur herbalist who is one of his employers. His only naive hope is that he will win the national lottery. When he discovers that his wife is the mistress of his town's wealthiest landowner, Taghi escapes to the local forest where he experiences a brief moment of peace and harmony. His wife comes looking for him, and in a fit of rage Taghi murders her and is eventually caught for his crime.

Postchi (The Postman) faced the same censorship issues as Gaav, but was eventually released in 1972. It was screened in Iran at the inaugural Tehran International Film Festival and at the Sepas Film festival. Internationally it was screened at the Venice Film Festival, where it received a special mention, the 22nd Berlin International Film Festival, where it received the Interfilm Award, and the 1972 Cannes Film Festival, where it was screened as part of the Directors' Fortnight.

=== The Cycle 1973–1978 ===
In 1973 Mehrjui began directing what was to be his most acclaimed film, The Cycle. Mehrjui got the idea for the film when a friend suggest that he investigate the black market and illicit blood traffic in Iran. Horrified with what he found, Mehrjui took the idea to Gholamhossein Sa'edi, who had written a play on the subject, "Aashghaal-duni". The play became the basis for the script, which then had to be approved by the Ministry of Culture before production could begin. With pressure from the Iranian medical community, approval was delayed for a year until Mehrjui began shooting the film in 1974. The film stars Saeed Kangarani, Esmail Mohammadi, Ezzatollah Entezami, Ali Nassirian, and Fourouzan.

In the film, Kangarani plays Ali, a teenager who has brought his dying father (Mohammadi) to Tehran in order to find medical treatment. They are too poor to afford any help from the local hospital, but Dr. Sameri (Entezami) offers them money in exchange for giving illegal and unsafe blood donations at a local blood bank. Ali begins giving blood and eventually works for Dr. Sameri in luring blood donors, despite spreading diseases in the process. Ali meets another doctor (Nassirian) who is attempting to establish a legitimate blood bank, and helps Dr. Sameri in sabotaging his plans. Ali also meets and becomes the lover of a young nurse, played by Fourouzan. As Ali becomes more and more involved in the illegal blood trafficking, his father's health worsens until he finally dies and Ali must decide what path his life will take. The film's title, Dayereh mina, refers to a line from a poem by Hafiz Shirazi: "Because of the cycle of the universe, my heart is bleeding."

The film was co-sponsored by the Ministry of Culture but encountered opposition from the Iranian medical establishment and was banned for three years. It was finally released in 1977, with help from pressure from the Carter administration to increase human rights and intellectual freedoms in Iran. Because of a crowded film marketplace, the film premiered in Paris, and then was released internationally where it received rave reviews and was compared to Luis Buñuel's Los Olvidados and Pier Paolo Pasolini's Accattone. The film won the Fédération Internationale de la Presse Cinématographique Prize at the Berlin Film Festival in 1978.

During this time, Iran was going through great political changes. The events leading up to the Iranian Revolution of 1979 were causing a gradual loosening of strict censorship laws, which Mehrjui and other artists had great hopes for.

While waiting for The Cycle to be released, Mehrjui worked on several documentaries. Alamut, a documentary on the Isamailis, was commissioned by Iranian National Television in 1974. He was also commissioned by the Iranian Blood Transfusion Center to create three short documentaries about safe and healthy blood donations. The films were used by the World Health Organization in several countries for years. In 1978, the Iranian Ministry of Health commissioned Mehrjui to make the documentary Peyvast kolieh, about kidney transplants.

=== Film career after the 1979 Iranian Revolution ===
The Iranian Revolution had been ongoing since 1978 through strikes and demonstrations. The Iranian monarchy collapsed on 11 February 1979 when guerrillas and rebel troops overwhelmed troops loyal to the Shah in armed street fighting. Iran voted by national referendum to become an Islamic Republic on 1 April 1979, and to approve a new theocratic constitution whereby Khomeini became Supreme Leader of the country, in December 1979.

Mehrjui stated that he, "enthusiastically took part in the revolution, shooting miles of reels of its daily events". After the revolution, the censorship of the Pahlavi regime was lifted, and for a time, artistic freedom seemed to flourish in the country. It was reported that the Ayatollah Ruhollah Khomeini saw Gaav on Iranian television and liked it, calling it "very instructive" and commissioning new prints to be made for distribution. However the Khomeini government would go on to impose its own rules for censorship in Iran, specifically laws that were in accordance to Islamic law. It was also required that a government official be present during the shooting of all films.

Mehrjui then directed Hayat-e Poshti Madrese-ye Adl-e Afagh (The School We Went to) in 1980. The film stars Ezzatollah Entezami and Ali Nassirian and is from a story by Fereydoon Doostdar. The film was sponsored by the Iranian Institute for the Intellectual Development of Children and Young Adults, whose filmmaking department was co-founded by Abbas Kiarostami. The film, seen as an allegory for the recent revolution, is about a group of high school students who join forces and rebel against their authoritative and abusive school principal. Film critic Hagir Daryoush criticized both the film and Mehrjui as propaganda and a work of the new regime more than Mehrjui himself.

In 1981, Mehrjui and his family traveled to Paris and remained there for several years, along with several other Iranian refugees in France. During this time he made a feature-length semi-documentary about the poet Arthur Rimbaud for French TV, Voyage au Pays de Rimbaud in 1983. It was shown at the 1983 Venice Film Festival and at the 1983 London Film Festival.

In 1985, Mehrjui and his family returned to Iran and Mehrjui resumed his film career under the new regime.

In Hamoun (1989), a portrait of an intellectual whose life is falling apart, Mehrjui sought to depict his generation's post-revolutionary turn from politics to mysticism. Hamoon was voted the best Iranian film ever by readers and contributors to the Iranian journal Film Monthly.

In 1995, Mehrjui made Pari, an unauthorized loose film adaptation of J. D. Salinger's book Franny and Zooey. Though the film could be distributed legally in Iran since the country has no official copyright relations with the United States, Salinger had his lawyers block a planned screening of the film at Lincoln Center in 1998. Mehrjui called Salinger's action "bewildering", explaining that he saw his film as "a kind of cultural exchange". His follow-up film, 1997's Leila, is a melodrama about an urban, upper-middle-class couple who learn that the wife is unable to bear children.

His last film, titled Laminor, was released in 2019.

== Cinematic style and legacy ==
Modern Iranian cinema begins with Mehrjui. Mehrjui introduced realism, symbolism, and the sensibilities of art cinema. His films have some resemblance with those of Rosselini, De Sica, and Satyajit Ray, but he also added something distinctively Iranian, in the process starting one of the greatest modern film waves.

The one constant in Mehrjui's work was his attention to the discontents of contemporary, primarily urban, Iran. His film The Pear Tree (1999) has been hailed as the apotheosis of the director's examination of the Iranian bourgeoisie.

Since his film The Cow in 1969, Mehrjui, along with Nasser Taqvai, and Masoud Kimiai, was instrumental in paving the way for the Iranian cinematic renaissance, the so-called "Iranian New Wave".

== 2022 'Kill me' speech ==
In March 2022, Mehrjui publicly denounced the state censorship. In front of a filled cinema crowd, Mehrjui announced,

"Listen to me, I can't take it anymore," he said. "I want to fight [back]. Kill me, do whatever you want with me...destroy me, but I want my right.

== Murder and aftermath ==
Daryoush Mehrjui and his wife, Vahideh Mohammadifar, were found stabbed to death on 14 October 2023, in their villa in Meshkin Dasht, Karaj. Prior to this incident, Vahideh had posted on her social media page about anonymous personal threats, including threats from a non-Iranian individual with a knife.

On 17 October, Iranian police arrested ten individuals suspected of being involved in the murders, including "the main killer". Four Afghan immigrants were arrested by police days after the killing for their alleged involvement. One of them later confessed to being the killer, saying that he was a former employee of Mehrjui who harbored a grudge against him "due to financial issues". He was subsequently sentenced to death in February 2024 while the three others received prison terms ranging from eight to 36 years for being accomplices to the crime.

Their funeral was held at Roudaki Performance Hall in Tehran, with tributes from Jafar Panahi, Masoud Kimiai, Mohammad Rasoulof and Bahman Farmanara.

== Filmography ==
- Diamond 33 (1967)
- The Cow (1969)
- Mr. Naive (1970)
- The Postman (1971)
- The Cycle (1975)
- The School We Used to Go (1981)
- Journey to the Land of Rimbaud (1983); documentary in France
- The Tenants (1987 film)
- The Wild Bafti (1988)
- Hamoun (1990)
- The Lady (1991)
- Sara (1993)
- Pari (1995)
- Leila (1997)
- The Pear Tree (1998)
- The Mix (2000)
- To Stay Alive (2002)
- Mum's Guest (2004)
- Santouri (2007)
- Beloved Sky (2010)
- The Orange Suit (2012)
- Good To Be Back (2013)
- Ghosts (2014)
- La minor (2020)

== Awards ==
Mehrjui has received 49 national and international awards, including:

- Golden Seashell, San Sebastián International Film Festival 1993
- Silver Hugo, Chicago International Film Festival 1998
- Crystal Simorgh, Fajr Film Festival 2004
- Lifetime Achievement Award, 1st Diorama International Film Festival & Market (2019)

== Literature ==
- Hamid Dabashi, Masters & Masterpieces of Iranian Cinema, 451 p. (Mage Publishers, Washington, DC, 2007); Chapter IV, pp. 107–134: Dariush Mehrjui; The Cow. ISBN 0-934211-85-X
