= Farhad Mehrad =

Iranian singer and guitarist (1944–2002)

Farhad Mehrad فرهاد مهراد
- Born: 20 January 1944 (Pahlavi Iran) Tehran, Iran
- Died: 31 August 2002 (aged 58) Paris, France
- Genres: Pop; Iranian rock; folk rock
- Occupations: Singer; songwriter; guitarist; pianist
- Instruments: Vocal, Guitar, Piano
- Years active: 1964–1979, 1989–2002
- Formerly of: Black Cats, The Four Imps
- Website: Official website

Farhad Mehrad (20 January 1944 – 31 August 2002) was a popular Iranian singer, songwriter, guitarist and pianist. He was a versatile musician who released the first English rock and roll album in Iran. Farhad gained fame among the Iranian rock, pop and folk musicians before the Islamic Revolution of 1979. He was prohibited from singing for several years in Iran after the revolution. Farhad's first concert after the Islamic Revolution was held in 1990. He is still recognized as one of the most influential and respected contemporary Iranian singers. Farhad was also the founding member of the popular Iranian band Black Cats.

Farhad's song "Jomeh" (Friday) for the film "Khodahafez Rafigh" in 1971 brought him widespread popularity. Despite rumors that it was a political song written by Shahyar Ghanbari, these allegations were denied by Ghanbari himself on Tapesh TV's "Uncut" Show.

== Early life ==
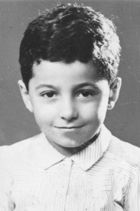
Farhad in his childhood, c 1940s–50s.

Farhad was born on 20 January 1944 in Tehran, Iran. His father was Reza Mehrad, an Iranian diplomat who worked in the Arabic countries for the Iranian Ministry of Foreign Affairs.

When Farhad was three years of age, he stayed outside his brother's room, listening to his violin lessons. His family bought Farhad a cello and he started taking lessons. After three lessons, his cello broke and, as Farhad describes, "The instrument broke into pieces so did my soul". That was the end of the cello for Farhad.

When he went to school, he found a passion for literature. He decided to study literature in high school but with the absence of his father, his uncle forced him to study science despite his weak results on all other subjects other than literature and English language. His interest being ignored, he quit high school in grade 11.

== Career ==
=== First band ===
After quitting high school, he met an Armenian music band, The Four Elfs. Using their instruments, he learned music by experience and after a while, he became the guitar player in the band. The band went to southern Iran to perform for the Iranian Oil Company Club – one of the biggest organizations in Iran, with many foreign employees. Before the start of the first night's performance, the band decided that Farhad would be the singer, because of the vocalist's absence.

Farhad's attention and fuss for correct pronunciation of the words, and his knowledge of world literature, came as a good advantage; when he performed a few songs in Italian, French and English, it was hard to believe his mother tongue was Persian. That led to the band's success, and they performed for an extended number of nights.

After a while, Farhad quit the band and started his solo career. In 1964, he performed a few English songs on an Iranian TV show, where he captured the attention of more people.

Later, in an event sponsored by Etelat Javanan, a popular youth magazine, he performed in Amjadieh Stadium. He played a few songs with the guitar which was followed by a huge crowd response. That was when Shahbal Shabpareh, the frontman of the Iranian popular band Black Cats heard about Farhad.

=== Black Cats ===
In 1967, sometime later after Shahbal and Farhad met, Farhad joined the Black Cats as a vocalist, guitar player and piano player. The Black Cats members were Shahbal Shabpareh (percussion), Shahram Shabpareh (guitar), Hassan Shamaizadeh (saxophone), Homayoun Khajehnouri (guitar), and Manouchehr Eslami (trumpet). The band started playing in the Couchini Club.

Manouchehr Eslami called Farhad the most important member of the band, saying:

Despite the fact that he couldn't read music sheets and had learned the music by listening and playing by experience, Farhad did not need to attend the practice sessions. By whispering the song a few times, he could synchronize his voice and instrument with the other band members. In fact, he attended the sessions only for the respect of other band members.

In the busiest and most successful time of the band, the first Persian song of Farhad, called Age Ye Jo Shaans Daashti ("With a Little Bit of Luck"), was used in dubbing the movie Banooye Zibaye Man (My Fair Lady) into Persian.

After a while, Farhad left the Black Cats to take care of his sick sister in England. Farhad met a famous producer, and he was offered a record deal by him. Farhad became ill and due to his illness and personal problems, the deal never took place. The journey which was supposed to last for two months, took one year.

=== 1969–1974 ===
In 1969, Farhad sang "Marde Tanha" ("A Lonely Man") for the movie Reza Motori (Reza, the Biker). The song was composed by Esfandyar Monfaredzadeh and the lyrics were written by Shahyar Ghanbari. After the release of the movie, the song was released on gramophone record and Farhad became a well-known singer.

Farhad only sang songs which had a message and he believed in their messages. That's why after "Marde Tanha" he only released three singles during the period from 1971 until 1973. Those were "Jomeh" ("Friday"), "Hafteye Khakestari" ("The Grey Week") and "Ayeneha" ("Mirrors").

Farhad dedicated the song "Shabaneh" to Sadegh Solhizadeh, M.D., the doctor who helped him overcoming his addiction.

=== During the revolution ===
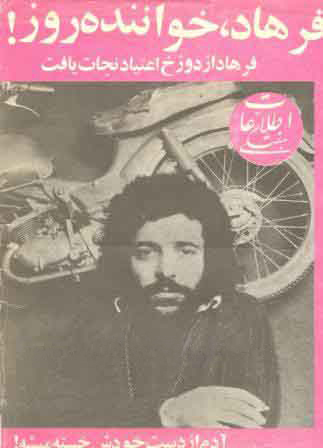
Farhad featured on a cover of Ettelaat-e Banuvan in 1979, with this caption: "Farhad rehabilitated from drug addiction".

Before the 1979 Iranian Revolution and during the political conflicts of the 1970s in Iran, Farhad recorded six songs with revolutionary messages that became the Iranian's voice of unity.

The day after the Iranian revolution, 11 February 1979, his song "Vahdat" ("Unity") was broadcast on the Iranian television in honor of revolution and freedom.

=== After the revolution ===
After the revolution, the Islamic government turned its back on Farhad and refused to grant him permission to publish his album many times. Even the song "Vahdat", which was once considered a song in honor of the revolution, was refused permission to be released. The government's reason was not the song itself, but rather the fact was that the Islamic Government was concerned about his popularity and his influence on people. The government wished Farhad to be forgotten.

Meanwhile, someone with strong connections within the Islamic government obtained official permission from the Ministry of Culture and Islamic Guidance and released Farhad's singles which were recorded before the revolution, as an album without Farhad's permission. He called the album Vahdat (Unity). Many Iranians bought the album to keep the memory of Farhad and his remarkable songs alive.

=== Comeback ===
In 1993, after 15 years of silence, Farhad was granted permission to release his first album, Khab Dar Bidari ("Sleep while Awake"), and it went straight to the top of the charts just after its release.

After this album, Farhad lost hope in the Iranian government's grant of permission system, and he released his next album Barf ("Snow") in the United States in 1999. Barf was released in Iran a year later.

=== Last album ===
After Barf, Farhad decided to record an album with songs from different countries and in different languages. He decided to call the album Amin (Amen); he started recording but died before he could finish the album.

== Death ==
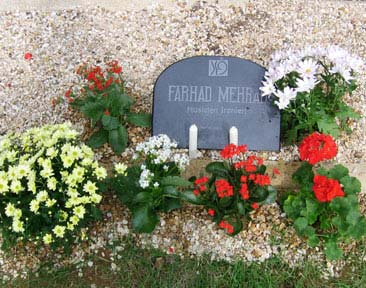
Farhad tomb at Thiais cemetery, located in the commune of Thiais, in the Val-de-Marne department, in the Île-de-France region.

In September 2000, after two years of treatment in Iran and France, Farhad's illness became serious. On 31 August 2002, he died of a malignant form of hepatitis C in Paris.

His funeral was attended by many Iranian stars like Dariush, Ebi and Persian entertainers. Iranian lyricist Shahyar Ghanbari said that part of him died with Farhad. Farid Zoland said he was devastated by Farhad's death. Ebi said that he lost his best friend and favorite singer.

Farhad is buried in the Cimetière de Thiais (Division:110 Ligne:7 N de la tombe:23), just outside Paris. After his death, a museum of his personal items was founded at cinema-museum in Tehran, Iran, and also two documentaries, Farhad's Fridays and Snow, have been made about him.

== Discography ==
=== Studio albums ===
- Khab Dar Bidari (1993)
- Barf (2000)
- Amin

| The name of Persian Songs | Year | The name of Songs in English |
|---|---|---|
| * Age Ye Jo Shans Dashtim | 1965 | With a little Bit of Luck |
| * Jomeh | 1970 | Friday |
| * Khasteh | 1972 | Tired |
| * Asir-e Shab | 1973 | Captive of the Night |
| * Shabaneh 1 | 1973 | Nightly 1 |
| * Ayeneha | 1971 | Mirrors |
| * Hafteh Khakestari | 1974 | Gray Week |
| * Koodakaneh | 1976 | Childish |
| * Saghf | 1977 | Roof |
| * Avar | 1977 | Ruin |
| * Shabaneh 2 | 1978 | Nightly 2 |
| * Jomeh baraye Jomeh | 1978 | Friday for Friday |
| * Vahdat | 1979 | Unity |
| * Khiale khoshi | 1993 | At Leisure |
| * Katibeh | 1997 | Inscription |
| *Banooye gisoo hanaei | 2000 | Lady With Hana Locks |

=== Singles (in English) ===
Farhad also sang many other English songs and in other languages, but only these songs were recorded.

- Take Five
- Yesterday
- I Put a Spell on You
- Come Down Jesus
- Sad Lisa
- Romance of Love
- Sunrise/Sunset
- When the Sun Comes Down
- Unchain My Heart
- Yesterday When I Was Young
- Don't Cry for Me Argentina
- Let It Be
- Master Song
- Alone Again (Naturally)
- You've Got a Friend
- Unchained Melody
- California Dreamin'
- Like a Sad Song
- Suzanne
- Windmills of Your Mind
- Everybody's Talking at Me
- Together Again
- Don't Let Me Be Misunderstood
- Sympathy
- Love's Been Good to Me
- Solitary Man
- Moment to Moment
- Hey, That's No Way to Say Goodbye
- Handyman
- You Won't Love Me
- If You Go Away
- I Call You
- I'll Be There
- Hurt
- Walking Alone
- Eleanor Rigby
- Japan Allspice (mixed in English and Persian)
- Good Fantasist (mixed in English and Persian)

=== Other languages songs ===
- Qui (French song)
- Et Moi Dans Mon Coin (French Song)
- Si je vivrai (French song)
- Doce Doce (Italian Song)
- Romanian song (A difficult song with whistle)
- Temnaya noch (Russian song)
- An die Freude (German song)
- Nadie me quiere (Spanish song)
- َNo pal (Akh Nazalis) (Armenian song)

== Filmography ==
Music department
- Keep the Flight in Mind (2012, Documentary) - singer as Farhad.
- Mahiha Dar khak Mimirand (1977) singer as Farhad
- Goodbye Friend (1971) singer as Farhad.
- Reza Motorcyclist (1970) singer as Farhad

== See also. ==
- Iranian rock
- List of Iranian musicians
