= Shahrzad (actress) =

Iranian actress (1950–2025)

Kobra Amin Saeedi (Persian: کبری امین‌سعیدی; December 9, 1950 – August 18, 2025), better known as Shahrzad (شهرزاد), was an Iranian actress and poet.

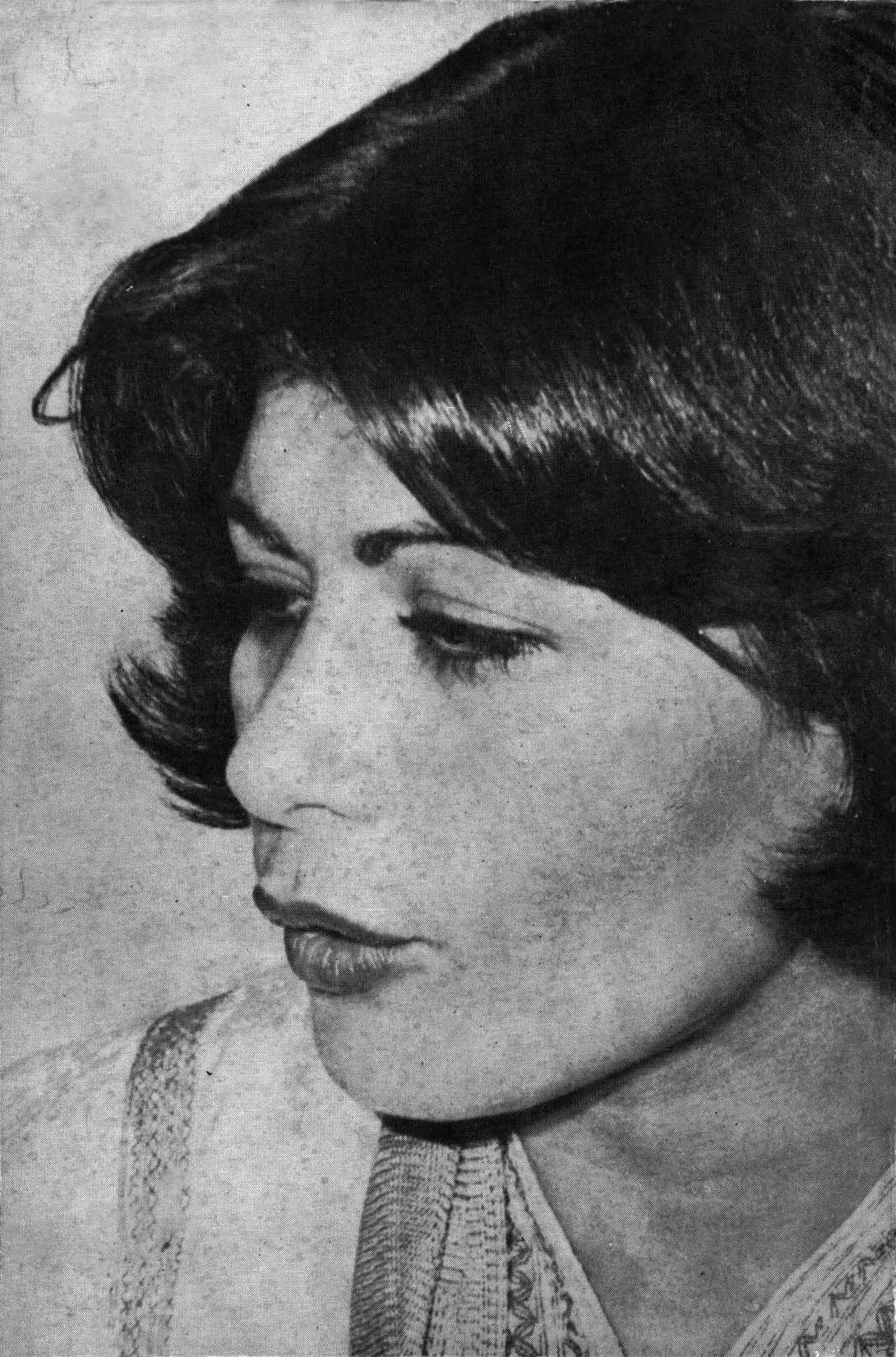
Shahrzad

== Life and career ==
Saeedi was born in Tehran on December 9, 1950. She had been dancing in the cafes of Laleh Zar Street since she was a teenager. Then, in 1969, under the pseudonym of Scheherazade, she played the role of a dancer named Soheila Ferdos in the film Qeysar. Initially she took on small roles in cinema and gradually played bigger roles in films such as Tangna (1973), Morning of the Fourth Day and Dash Akol, which won an award at the Sepas Festival.

In 1973, Shahrzad resigned from acting in protest against the prevailing atmosphere in Persian films, and became a member of the Azad Cinema Group and began making short films.

In 1977, Shahrzad made a feature film, Maryam and Mani, starring Pouri Banaei. This film is one of the few films in Iranian cinema before the revolution in which the protagonist, writer, and director are women. However, the film was banned that year and was released in 1980.

Following the 1979 revolution, she lost all assets, books, and films. She was present at the demonstration on March 8, 1979, and filmed the gathering, reportedly being arrested the same day.

Following the revolution she immigrated to Germany, but returned to Iran and spent the last years of her life in various cities, including Sirjan and Kerman, with illness and financial problems. She became homeless, and at some point she was forced to sleep in parks.

In 2013, a documentary film, Shahrzad was released, detailing her life.

She was referenced in Jafar Panahi's 2018 film, 3 Faces.

Saeedi died on August 18, 2025, at the age of 74.
