= Wood Pigeon (film) =

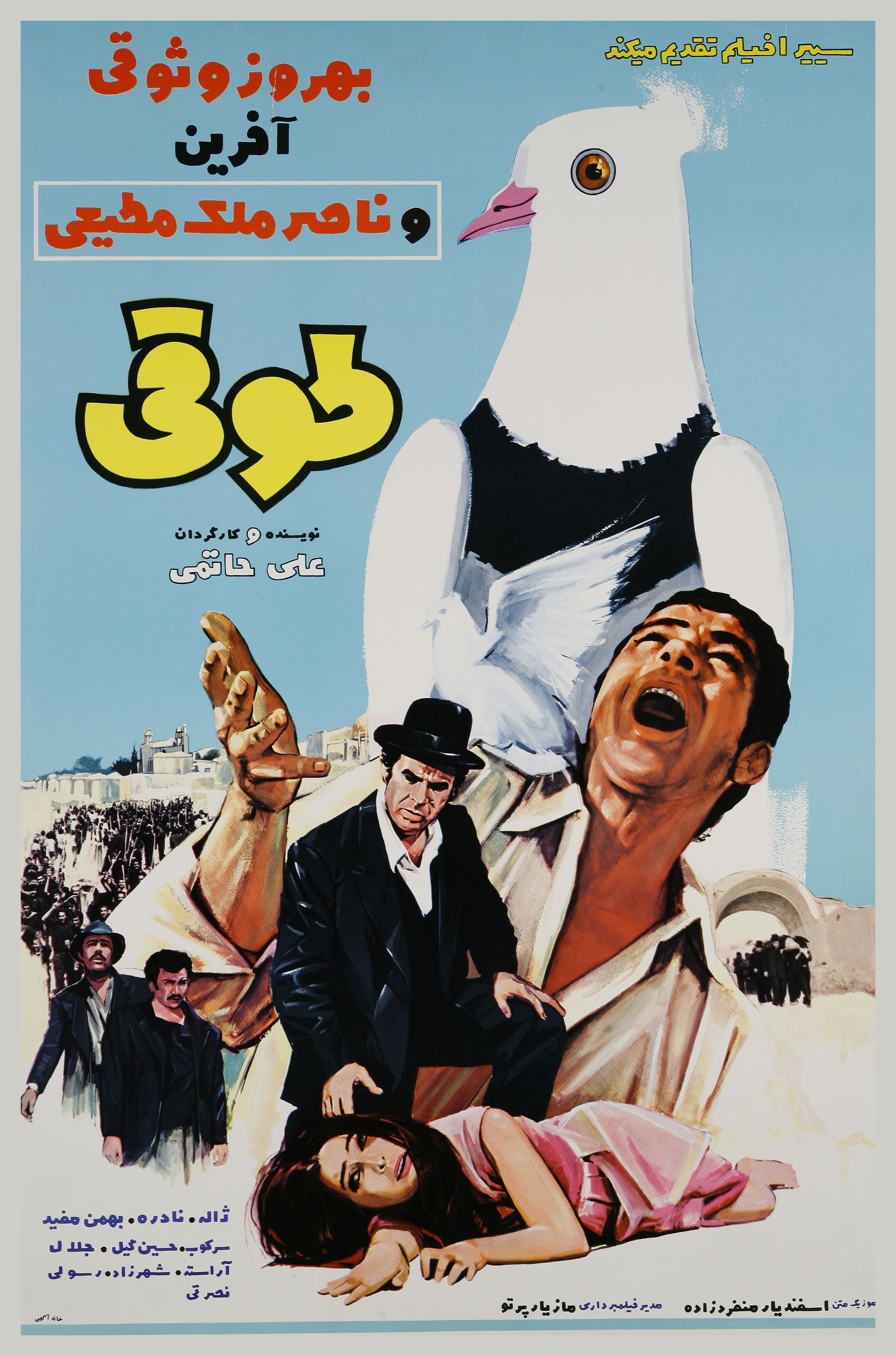
- Film poster
- Directed by: Ali Hatami
- Written by: Ali Hatami
- Produced by: Mehdi Mosayebi
- Starring: Behrouz Vossoughi; Afarin Obeysi; Naser Malek Motiee; Zhaleh Olov; Hamideh Kheirabadi; Bahman Mofid
- Cinematography: Maziar Partow
- Edited by: Maziar Partow
- Music by: Esfandiar Monfaredzadeh
- Production company: Siera Film
- Release date: 15 October 1970 (Iran)
- Running time: 110 minutes
- Country: Iran
- Language: Persian

Wood Pigeon (Persian: طوقی, romanized: Toughi), also known as The Ring-necked Dove, is a 1970 Iranian drama film, directed by Ali Hatami and starring Behrouz Vossoughi, Afarin Obeysi, Naser Malek Motiee, Zhaleh Olov, Hamideh Kheirabadi, and Bahman Mofid.

== Cast ==
- Behrouz Vossoughi as Ased Morteza
- Afarin Obeysi as Tooba
- Naser Malek Motiee as Ased Mostafa
- Zhaleh Olov as BiBi
- Hamideh Kheirabadi as Tooba's mother
- Bahman Mofid as Javad Khaldar
- Gholamreza Sarkoub as Abbas Garichi
- Mohsen Arrasteh
- Hossein Gil
