= Knucklebones (film) =

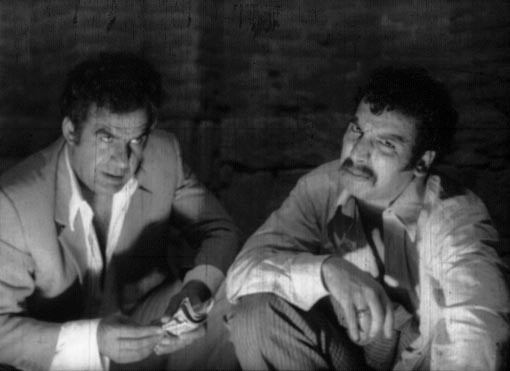
- A scene of the film
- سه‌قاپ
- Directed by: Zakaria Hashemi
- Screenplay by: Zakaria Hashemi
- Produced by: Behrouz Sayyadi
- Starring: Naser malek Motiee; Bahman Mofid; Shahruz Ramtin; Hasan Khayat-Bashi; Hossein Gil; Morvarid; Ahmad Hashemi
- Cinematography: Behrouz Sayyadi
- Music by: Morteza Hannaneh
- Production company: Imazh film
- Distributed by: Payam Cinematic Institute
- Release date: 1971
- Running time: 105 minutes
- Country: Iran
- Language: Persian

Knucklebones (Persian: سه‌قاپ) (also known as The Gamble) is a 1971 Iranian film directed by Zakaria Hashemi. It stars Naser Malek Motiee, Bahman Mofid, Shahrzad, and Morvarid.

== Plot ==
Borzou is an expert at gambling and spends most of his life getting a fortune by gambling and stealing. He marries a woman named Maryam (Morvarid) and continues his lifestyle of gambling despite being married. He prioritizes his friends Ali Tatar (Bahman Mofid) and Khalife (Hassan Khayat Bashi) over his wife. Soon, he gets into more dangerous crime with criminals like Assadollah Mir Ghazal (Hossein Gale), Mahmoud the Escaper (Shahrouz Ramtin), Hossein Joo Joo (Ahmad Hashemi). Maryam is unhappy and begs him to give his crime life up to care for their unborn child. He agrees but this does not last long. Ali Tatar asks Borzou to help him get money for his sister's dowry. He realizes that he has to gamble again to raise the money.

In order to win the money by gambling he must meet in a crypt owned by Jabbar the Beautiful (Mohammad Bahrami) who sells bodies from the crypt. On the way to the crypt, Borzou buys a doll for his daughter. Initially, the game with Jabbar goes well but Borzou resorts to cheating. Once Jabbar catches him, all three get in a fight which results in Ali and Borzou getting stabbed. Even though he is badly wounded, Borzou manages his way home and dies just after delivering the doll to his wife.

== Cast ==
Actor	Role	Notes
Naser Malek Motiee	Borzou	The main role
Bahman Mofid	Ali Tatar	Borzou's best friend
Hossein Gil	Asdullah	Borzou's rival in Se-Ghap
Yadullah Shirandami	Esmal the Judge	Judge of the games
Shahruz Ramtin	Mahmud Farari	Asdullah's friend
Hasan Khayyat-Bashi	Abbas-e Khelifeh	Borzou's friend
Ahmad Hashemi	Hossein Juju	Asdullah's friend
Morvarid	Maryam	Borzou's wife
Mahmoud Bahrami	Jabbar kafan dozdeh	landlord
