= Jahangir Forouhar =

Iranian actor

- جهانگیر فروهر
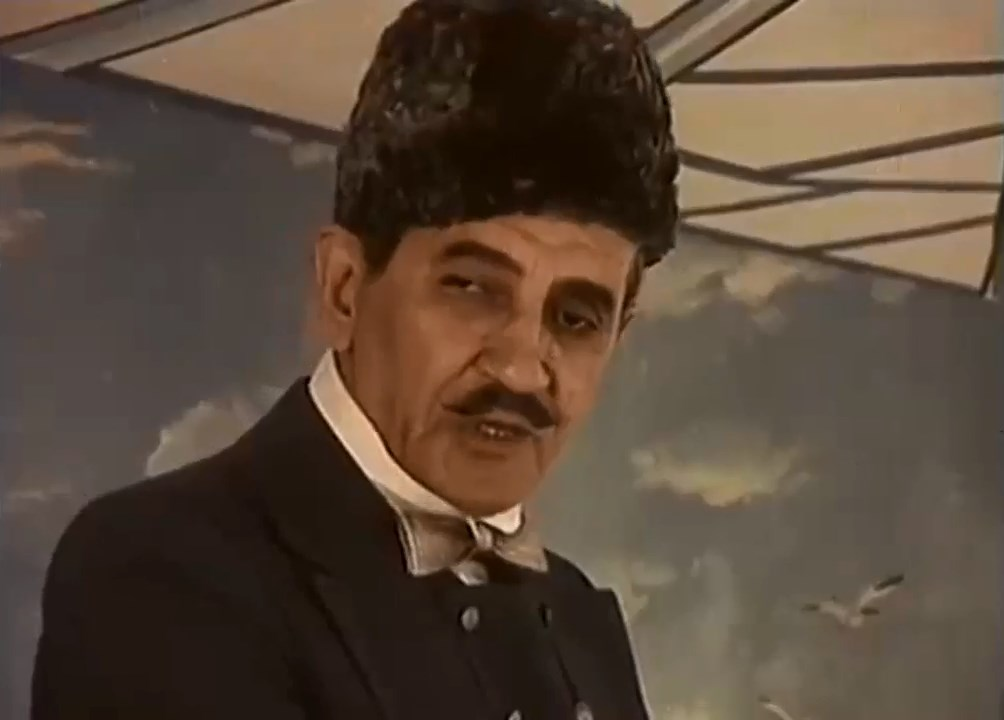
- Born: May 24, 1916; Isfahan
- Died: November 6, 1997 (aged 81); Tehran
- Occupation: Actor
- Spouse(s): Ashraf Kashani; Giti Forouhar; Farangis Farahzadi; Sima Zahedi
- Children: 8, including Leila

Jahangir Forouhar (Persian: جهانگیر فروهر; May 24, 1916 – November 6, 1997) was an Iranian actor

== Biography ==
Forouhar was born in 1916 in the city of Isfahan. His father was Mustafa Khan Davam al-Saltanah. His grandfather was Mirza Mohammad Ali Khan Ghavam al-Dawlah and he was descendant of Mirza Abbas Khan Ghavam al-Dawlah.

He was father of Iranian entertainer Leila Forouhar.

He started in theater at the age 18. He started acting in cinemas in 1945 with the film Ganjineh Soleiman. After the revolution, he was summoned to the courts of the Islamic Revolutionary Court. In 1970, he received a commendation for the second role of a man for the film House of Solitude (Mehdi Sabbaghzadeh) from the 10th Fajr Film Festival.

== Filmography ==
- Dash Akol (1971)
- The Suitor (1972)
- Sattar Khan (1972)
- Mozaffar (1974)
- Soltan-e Sahebgharan (1974, TV series)
- The Ghost Valley's Treasure Mysteries (1974)
- The Falconet (1975)
- My Uncle Napoleon (1976, TV series)
- Dar Emtedade Shab (1978)
- Desiderium (1978)
- Hezar Dastan (1987, TV series)
- Shaheed-e Kufa (1992–1998, TV series)
