= Saeed Rad =

Iranian actor and playwright (1944–2024)

- سعید راد
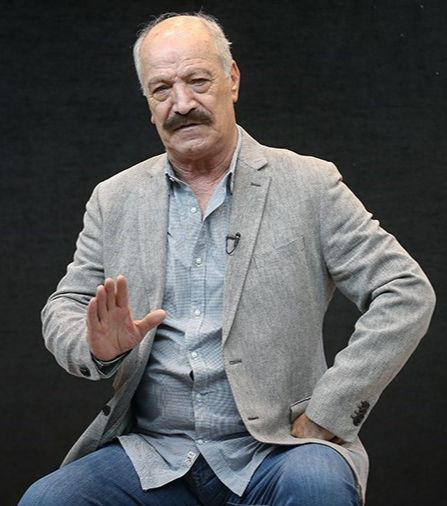
- Rad in 2019
- Born: Ahmad Saeed Haghparast Rad; 26 October 1944; Tehran, Iran
- Died: 22 July 2024 (aged 79); Tehran, Iran
- Occupation: Actor
- Years active: 1968–1984; 2003–2021
- Spouse: Nooshafarin (m. 1975; div. 1993)
- Children: 2
- Relatives: Adam Hemati (grandson)

Ahmad Saeed Hagh Parast Raad (Persian: احمد سعید حق پرست راد, also romanized as Said Rād and Sa'id Rād; 26 October 1944 – 22 July 2024) was an Iranian actor and playwright who started his career in 1968. Rad left Iran in 1986 and lived in Canada but returned in 2000 to continue his career.

After a minor role in M. Zarrindast's Conquerors of the Desert in 1969, he was invited by Amir Naderi to play the leading role of his debut film, Adieu Friend (1971).

He married singer/actress Nooshafarin in 1975, and they separated in 1993.

Raad died following complications from a fall on 22 July 2024, at the age of 79.

== Filmography ==
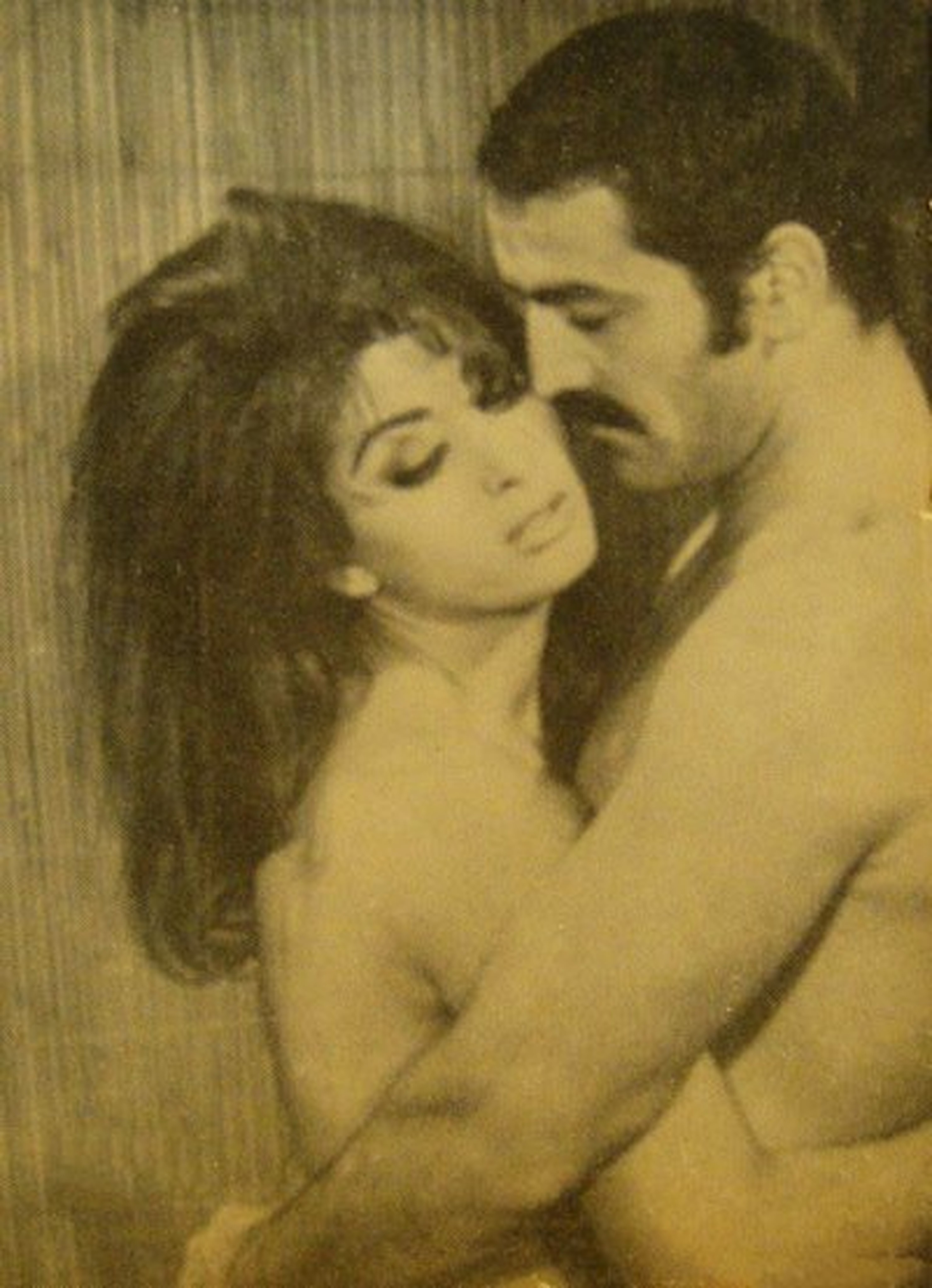
Marjan with Saeed Rad in 1972

- Deadlock, 1973
- Made in Iran, 1979
- Journey of the Stone, 1977
- The Border, 1981
- The Red Line, 1982
- The Imperilled, 1982
- Farmaan, 1982
- Daadshah, 1983
- Crossing the Mine Field, 1983
- Eagles, 1984
- Duel, 2002
- Che, 2014
- End of Service, 2015
- Love and Frenzy, 2015

He has also acted in notable Iranian TV series including In the Eye of the Wind in the role of Reza Shah.
