= Samad (character) =

Fictional character on Iranian television

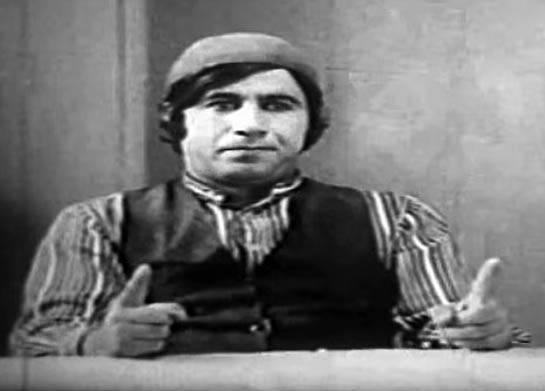
Samad Agha

"Samad Becomes Lucky" (1975) movie poster

Samad (also Samad Agha; in Persian: صمد) is a fictional character created by Iranian director and actor, Parviz Sayyad. Samad was firstly characterized in a famous Iranian television series, Sarkar Ostvar (1967–1970), as a country boy.

== Creation ==
In the Iranian Sarkar Ostvar television series there was a naive, country boy character without a name played by Parviz Sayyad. On the show, the country boy was frequently arrested for his ignorance. After a poll done by National Iranian Television (NITV), the TV series rated popular and people were also asking why the country boy was no longer in the series. After in which, Sayyad wrote a screenplay based on that country boy character and named him Samad.

== Characteristics ==
- Samad likes to be called "Mr. Samad" (Persian: صمد آقا).
- Samad loves his mother, Nene Agha very much, she was played by actress Farrokhlagha Houshmand.
- Samad is in love with Laila, the daughter of Kadkhoda (village chief) and his competitor in his sentimental attempts is Einullah, the son of Mash Baqer, a rich man.
- Samad's frequent gag in the films is using his finger as a defense mechanism. He beats the enemies by poking their eyes.

== Filmography ==
=== Television ===
- 1967 to 1970 – Sarkar Ostvar (Persian: سرکار استوار), this was the precursor to the show.
- 1974 – The Adventures of Samad (Persian: ماجراهای صمد)
- 1975 – Our Agent is in Danger (Persian: مأمور ما صمد در بالاتر از خطر)

=== Film ===
- 1971 – Samad and the Rug of Hazrat Suleiman (Persian: صمد و قالیچه حضرت سلیمان, romanized: Samad va Ghalicheyeh Hazrat Soleyman)
- 1972 – Samad and the Steel Armored Ogre (Persian: صمد و فولادزره دیو, romanized: Samad va Fulad Zereh Div)
- 1972 – Samad and Sami, Leila and Lily (Persian: صمد و سامی، لیلا و لیلی, romanized: Samad va Sami, Leila va Leili)
- 1973 – Samad Goes to School (Persian: صمد به مدرسه می‌رود, romanized: Samad be Madreseh Miravad)
- 1974 – Samad Becomes an Actor (Persian: صمد آرتیست می‌شود, romanized: Samad Artist Mishavad)
- 1975 – Samad Becomes Lucky (Persian: صمد خوشبخت می‌شود, romanized: Samad Khoshbakht Mishavad)
- 1977 – Samad in the Way of Dragon (Persian: صمد در راه اژدها, romanized: Samad dar rah ejdeha)
- 1978 – Samad Becomes Homeless (Persian: صمد دربه‌در می‌شود, romanized: Samad Dar-be-dar Mishavad)
- 1979 – Samad Goes to the City (Persian: صمد به شهر می‌رود, romanized: Samad be Shahr Miravad)
- 1986 – Samad Goes to War (Persian: صمد به جنگ ميرود, romanized: Samad Be Jang Miravad)
- 1988 – Samad Returns from the War (Persian: صمد از جنگ برمیگردد, romanized: Samad az jang barmigardad)

=== Theater ===
- Parviz Sayyad and His Samad (1994)
- Hadi Khorsandi and His Samad (1998)
- Samad Goes to War (1990)
- Samad Returns From War (1992)
