= Mehdi in Black and Hot Mini Pants =

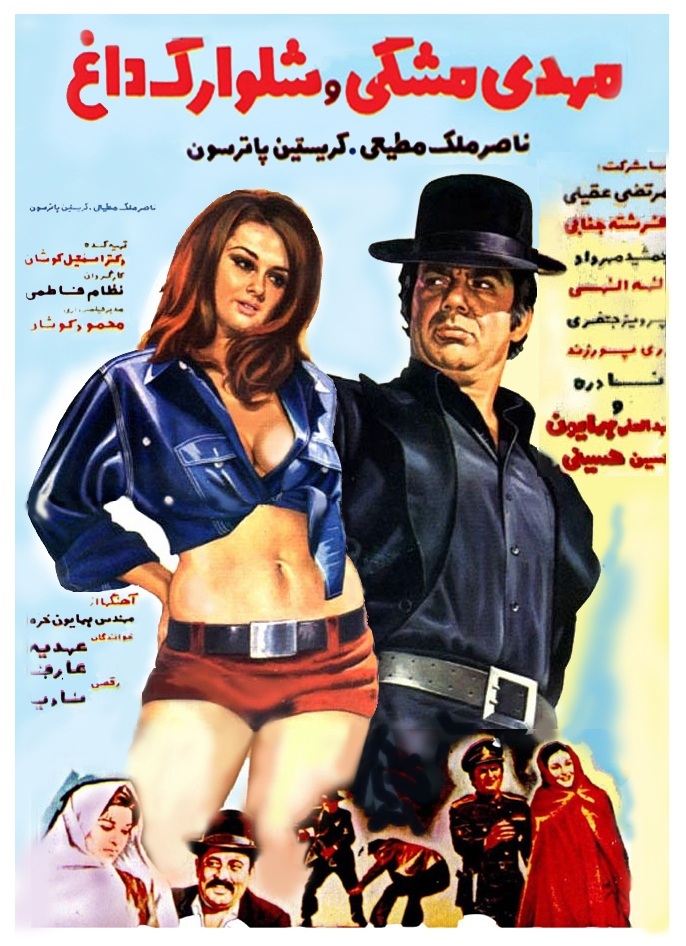
- مهدی مشکی و شلوارک داغ
- Directed by: Nezam Fatemi
- Written by: Ahmad Najibzadeh
- Produced by: Esmail Koushan
- Starring: Naser Malek Motiee; Farrokhlagha Houshmand; Fereshteh Jenabi; Abdolali Homayoun; Morteza Aghili; Parviz Jafari; Hamideh Kheirabadi; Zari Pourzand; Elaheh Elahi; Jamshid Mehrdad; Christian Patterson
- Music by: Roubic Mansouri
- Release date: 1972
- Running time: 90 minutes
- Country: Iran
- Language: Persian

Mehdi in Black and Hot Mini Pants (Persian: مهدی مشکی و شلوارک داغ, romanized: Mehdi Meshki Va Shalvarak-e Dagh) is a 1972 Iranian romance film directed by Nezam Fatemi, and starring Naser Malek Motiee, Farrokhlagha Houshmand, Fereshteh Jenabi, Abdolali Homayoun, Morteza Aghili, Hamideh Kheirabadi and Christian Patterson.

== Plot ==
Mehdi Black and Hot pants

Mehdi in Black falls in love with a foreign girl who loves him back. However, in order for them to get married, Mehdi has to fulfill his father's will and marry off her sisters first. He is able to quickly solve this problem with the help of his sisters' suitors and marry his beloved.
