= Esfandiar Monfaredzadeh =

Iranian film composer

Esfandiar Monfaredzadeh اسفندیار منفردزاده
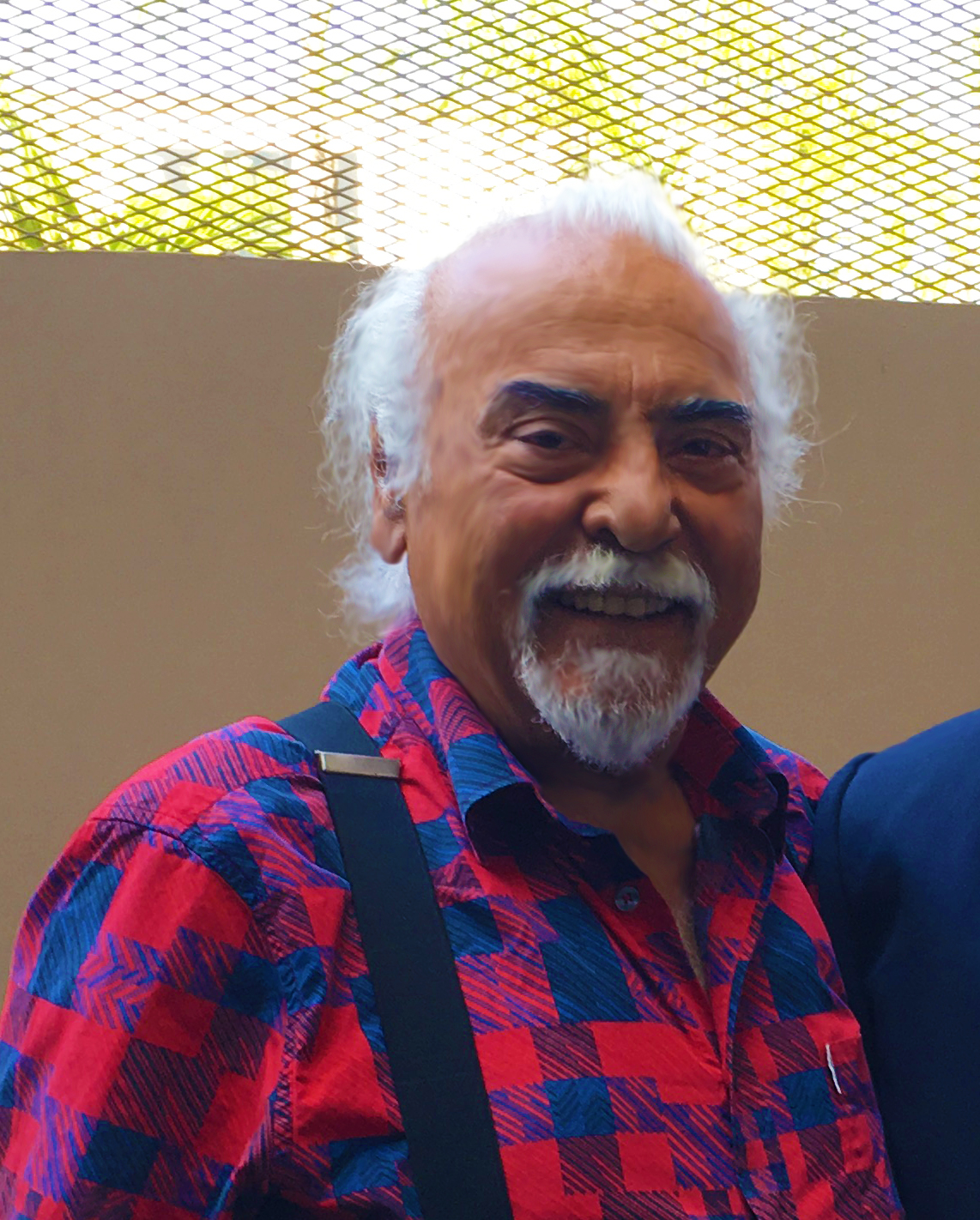

Background information
- Born: 15 March 1941 (age 84); Tehran, Iran
- Occupations: Film composer, songwriter, filmmaker
- Instruments: Piano, Oud

Esfandiar Monfaredzadeh (Persian: اسفندیار منفردزاده, romanized: Esfandiyār Monfaredzādeh; born 15 March 1941 in Tehran) is an Iranian pioneer film composer, songwriter, and filmmaker. He is recognized for his contribution to film and pop music in Iran. His major works include Qeysar, Toughi, Dash Akol, Tangna, The Deers (Gavaznhā).

== Career ==
=== Early years ===
He started his career early in his teens as percussionist and accordionist in the National Iranian Radio Children's Program. In 1958, he joined the Youth Orchestra of National Iranian Radio as contrabassist where shortly after he would be trusted with all the music arrangement and the conductor duties.

=== Cinema ===
From his early ages, he was fascinated by cinema and filmmaking. This was the dream which he and his lifelong friend Masoud Kimiai (Iranian film director, screenwriter, and producer) shared. Finally, in 1967, when Masoud Kimiai got a chance to direct his first film (Come Stranger, 196, Monfaredzadeh composed the score. However, it was their second collaboration (Qeysar, 1969) that made history. Months before Qeysar was released, he had left Iran to continue his studies in Germany where he had the opportunity to be acquainted with the Confederation of Iranian Students which helped him to reshape and deepen his social and political ideas. Hence, the Qeysar outbreak made him give up his studies and come back to Iran to pursue his cinematic career. The quality of his work in Qeysar, along with the success of the film at the box office and among the critics, put more attention on the music for films in Iran which until that day was not taken seriously by the Iranian film industry. The following year, he won the Best Film Score award for Qeysar at the second "Sepas Awards" ceremony which would be repeated the next year for his third collaboration with Masoud Kimiai (Reza Motori, 1970). His film scores continued with Toughi (Ali Hatami, 1970), Window (Jalal Moghaddam, 1970), Dash Akol (Masoud Kimiai, 1971), Topoli (Reza Mirlohi, 1972), Balouch (Masoud Kimiai, 1972), Soil (Masoud Kimiai, 1973), Tangna (Amir Naderi, 1973), and The Deers (Gavaznha) (Masoud Kimiai, 1974).

=== Pop music ===
In 1965 and after working on the National Iranian Radio and later the University of Tehran orchestra, he began his collaboration with the Tanin Recording Studio (the first private recording studio in Iran), and along with his comrades he contributed to shape a new atmosphere in the Iranian pop music. In parallel to his cinematic activities and through his well-known songs such as "Friday" and "Nightly 1", he tried to represent Iranian people by picturing their pains and sorrows under the totalitarian Shah’s regime. In 1973, he was sentenced to jail for his social and political ideas. However, after his release he would not remain silent and with his works (songs such as "Gonjishkak-e Ashi Mashi", "Childish (Koudakaneh)", "Nightly 2" or "Friday for Friday"), he accompanied and supported people in the upcoming revolution.

=== Institute for the Intellectual Development of Children and Young Adults ===
In 1970, he joined the “Institute for the Intellectual Development of Children and Young Adults" where he contributed to establish the Children’s Film Training Center as well as writing music for audio books, animations, and short films produced by the institute.

== Exile ==
Shortly after the Iranian Revolution in February 1979, he concluded that this was not what he has wished for, so he expressed his concerns with the songs "Unity" and "Whisper". He decided to leave Iran and go to a self-imposed exile which continues to this day. During the exile, his artistic activities were extremely limited; however, he still believes in change for his country and his people.

== Selected filmography ==
- Keep the Flight in Mind (2012)
- Iranian Taboo (2011)
- Epitaph (2004)
- Sobh-e Khakestar (1977)
- Gavaznha (1976) – aka The Deers
- Ghazal (1975)
- Haft-tir-ha-ye Choubi (1975)
- Pesar-e Sharghi (1975)
- Rokh (1974)
- Nefrin (1973)
- Tangna (1973) – aka Strait
- Balouch (1972)
- Khak (1972) – aka The Soil
- Topoli (1972)
- Dash Akol (1971)
- Khastegar (1971) – aka The Suitor
- Khodahafez Rafigh (1971) – aka Goodbye, Friend!
- Toughi (1971)
- Hassan Kachal (1970)
- The Window (1970)
- Raqqase-ye Shahr (1970)
- Reza Motori (1970) – aka Reza, the Motorcyclist
- Amou Sibilou (1969)
- Qeysar (1969)
