= Dash Akol =

1971 Iranian film

- Directed by: Masoud Kimiai
- Written by: Sadegh Hedayat
- Screenplay by: Masoud Kimiai
- Story by: Dash Akol
- Produced by: Houshang Kaveh
- Starring: Behrouz Vossoughi; Mary Apick; Bahman Mofid; Jahangir Forouhar; Zhaleh Olov
- Cinematography: Nemat Haghighi
- Edited by: Amir Hussein Hami; Masoud Kimiai
- Music by: Esfandiar Monfaredzadeh
- Release date: 1971
- Running time: 95 min
- Country: Iran
- Language: Persian

Dash Akol (Persian: داش آکُل, romanized: Dāsh Ākol) is a 1971 Iranian drama film directed by Masoud Kimiai. It was adopted from a short story of the same name written by Sadegh Hedayat in his short story collection Three Drops of Blood.

== Cast ==
- Behrouz Vossoughi as Dash Akol
- Mary Apick as Marjan
- Bahman Mofid as Kaka Rostam
- Jahangir Forouhar as Dash Akol's friend
- Manuchehr Ahmadi as Chelingar
- Mansoor Matin as Haj Samad
- Ebrahim Naderi as Kaka Rostam's friend
- Jalal Pishvaian as Kaka Rostam's friend
- Shahrzad
- Zhaleh Olov
- Kan'an Kiani
