= Jalal Pishvaian =

Iranian actor (1930–2021)

- جلال پیشوائیان
- Born: 10 June 1930; Tehran, Imperial State of Iran
- Died: 11 December 2021 (aged 91); Germany
- Years active: 1962–2011

Jalal Pishvaian (10 June 1930 – 11 December 2021) was an Iranian actor. He acted in over 80 films.

== Life and career ==
Jalal Pishvaian was born on 10 June 1930 in Tehran, Iran. Prior to acting, he owned a gym and was involved in boxing and Judo.

Pishvaian is associated with Iranian New Wave, Persian film, and popular film; he often played villainous characters. One of his first films was in 1962 with A Girl Is Screaming. Before 1978 and the Iranian Revolution, his other notable films were The Hungry Wolves (1962), Qeysar (1969; English: Caesar), Khodahafez Rafigh (1971; English: Goodbye Friend), and Reza, the Motorcyclist (1970).

During the period of the Iranian Revolution and immediately after, Pishvaian was considered as one of the symbols of the "vulgarity". In 1985, Pishvaian emigrated to Germany, with the intention of retiring from acting; however 10 years in 1995 later he returned to acting again.

He died after fracturing his pelvis in Germany, on 11 December 2021, at the age of 91.
