= Hamideh Kheirabadi =

Iranian actress (1924-2010)

- حمیده خیر آبادی
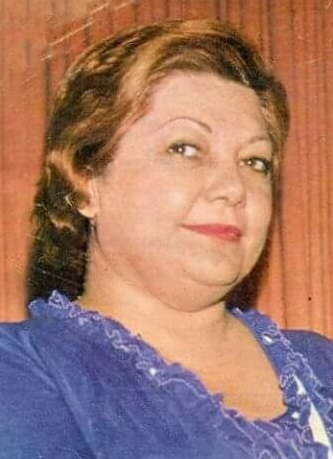
- Born: 21 December 1924; Rasht, Iran
- Died: 19 April 2010 (aged 85); Tehran, Iran
- Resting place: Behesht-e Zahra Cemetery
- Occupation: Actress
- Years active: 1953–2010
- Spouse: Ali Ghasemi
- Children: Soraya

Hamideh Kheirabadi (Persian: حمیده خیرآبادی; 21 December 1924 – 19 April 2010) was an Iranian film and theatre actress. She played in more than 200 feature films and in over 20 television series. In Iran, she is affectionately referred to as Nādereh and Mother of the Iranian Cinema.

== Life and career ==
Hamideh Kheirabadi was born in Rasht, the capital of the Gilan province, Iran. Whereas she married at the very young age of 13, she continued with her studies and completed her secondary-school education. In the middle of the 1950s she divorced from her husband and lived thereafter with her daughter, Soraya Ghasemi (born 1940). Kheirabadi's acting career began in 1947 with theatre.

Hamideh Kheirabadi worked with a large number of celebrated Iranian film directors, such as Ali Hatami, Dariush Mehrjoui, Masud Kimiai, Mohsen Makhmalbaf, Sirus Alvand, Sirus Moghaddam and Tahmineh Milani. She was thrice nominated for the Crystal Simorgh Prize. During the second Iranian Celebration of Screen Actors, held on 5 January 2008 at Tehran's Arikeh-ye Iranian Hall, Kheirābādi was honoured with a Lifetime Achievement Award.

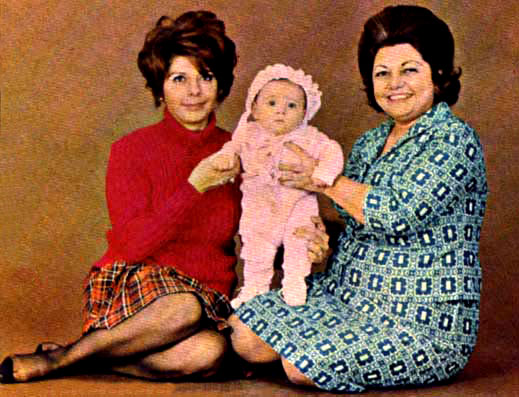
Kheirabadi with her daughter, Soraya and her granddaughter, Parmida

It has been reported that plans had been made that after six years of absence from acting, Kheirabadi would appear before camera on 23 April 2010, playing the role of herself in a series named The Land of the People (Zamin-e Ensān-hā), directed by Abolhasan Dāvoudi.

Hamideh Kheirābādi died at her home in Tehran on Monday night, 19 April 2010, at the age of 86. The cause for her death has been given as brain stroke. Ms Kheirābādi was buried in Section 66 of Behesht-e Zahra Cemetery in Tehran, on Tuesday 20 April 2010.

== Filmography ==
A very extensive filmography of Hamideh Kheirabadi can be found on the Gilaki Wikipedia. At present a less extensive filmography of Hamideh Kheirābādi is available at the Persian Wikipedia. What follows is only a selected filmography.

=== Feature films ===
- Amir Arsalān-e Nāmdār (Amir Arsalān the Great), 1955, directed by Shāpour Yāsami.
- Almās 33 (Diamond 33), 1967, directed by Dariush Mehrjoui
- Reza Motorcyclist (Reza Motori) (1970) – directed by Masoud Kimiai
- Wood Pigeon (Toghi) (1970) – directed by Ali Hatami
- Bābā Shamal (Bābā Shamal), 1971, directed by Ali Hatami
- Mehdi in Black and Hot Mini Pants, 1972
- Shab-e Aftābi (The Sunny Night), 1977, directed by Sirus Alvand
- Ejāreh-neshin-hā (The Tenants), 1986, directed by Dariush Mehrjoui
- Mādar (Mother), 1989, directed by Ali Hatami
- Bach'che'hā-ye Talāgh (The Children of Divorce), 1989, directed by Tahmineh Milani
- Bānu (The Lady), 1991, directed by Dariush Mehrjoui
- Honarpisheh (The Actor), 1992, directed by Mohsen Makhmalbaf
- Soroud-e Tavallod (The Birthday-song), 2004, directed by Ali Ghavitan

=== Television series ===
- Pedar Salar (The Paternalist), 1993, directed by Akbar Khājavi
- Khaneh Sabz (The Green Home), 1996, directed by Bijan Birang and Masoud Rassām

== See also ==
- Cinema of Iran
