= Barf (album) =

Studio album by Farhad Mehrad
- Released: December 2, 2003
- Genre: Pop, rock, Instrumental
- Length: 30:05
- Label: Avang Music

Farhad Mehrad chronology
| Khab Dar Bidari (1993) | Barf (2003) |

Professional ratings
Review scores
| Source | Rating |
|---|---|
| Allmusic | 3/5 stars |

Barf is the last studio album by Persian rock singer Farhad Mehrad. It was released in Iran in 1998.

== Track listing ==
| No. | Title | Title in English | Length |
|---|---|---|---|
| 1. | "Barf" | Snow | 04:35 |
| 2. | "Morghe Sahar" | Dawn Bird | 02:53 |
| 3. | "Robaiat" | Quatrains | 02:16 |
| 4. | "Gandhi" | Gandhi | 03:35 |
| 5. | "Gole Yakh" | Edelweiss | 02:49 |
| 6. | "Khab Dar Bidari" | The Waking Dream | 06:24 |
| 7. | "Katibeh" | Inscription | 03:18 |
| 8. | "Vaghti ke Bache Boudam"" | When I Was a Child | 04:15 |
| Total length: | | | 30:05 |
