= Zakaria Hashemi =

Iranian actor and film director (born 1936)

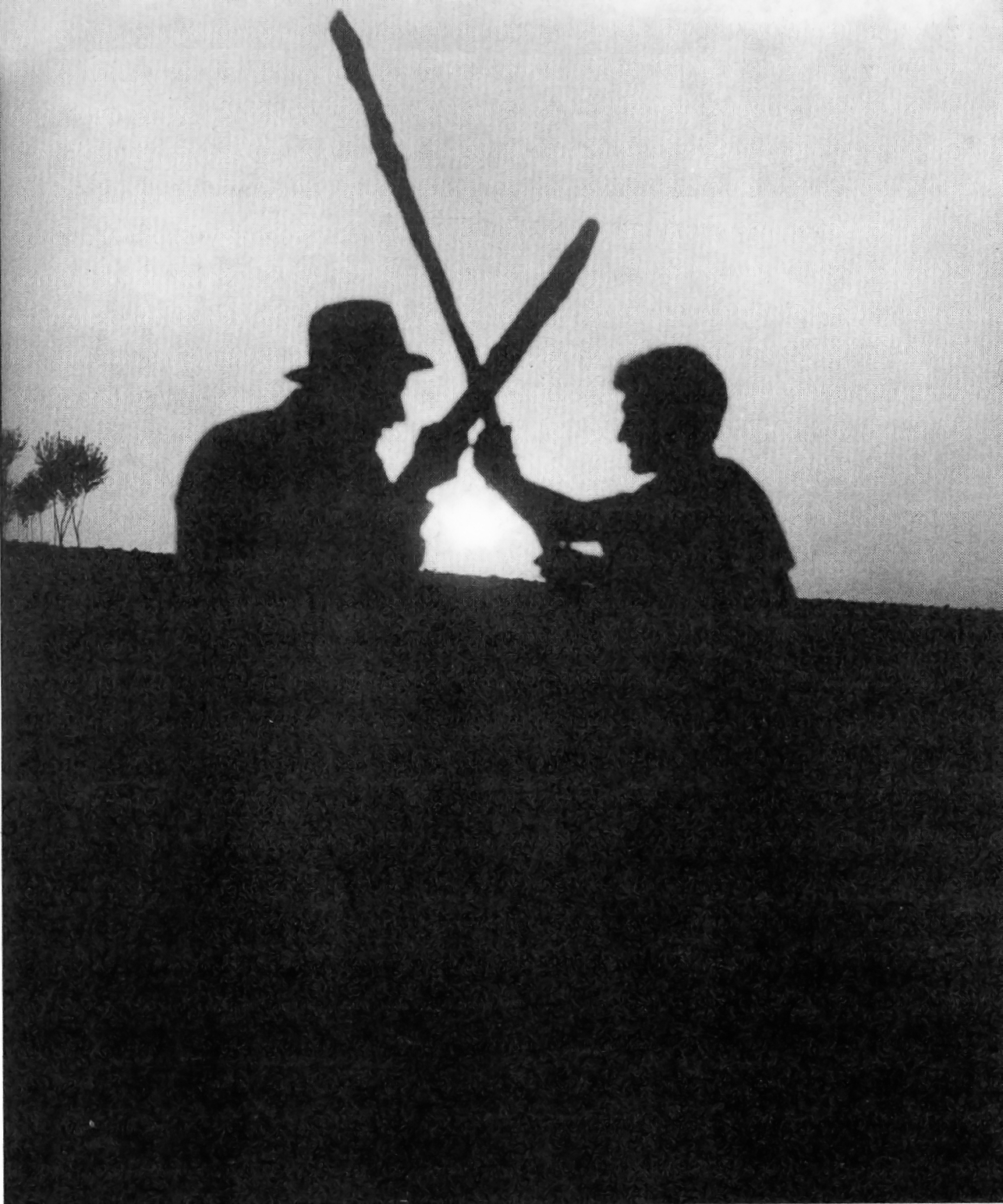
Zakaria Hashemi in Jonub-e Shahr, directed by Farrokh Ghaffary, 1959

Zakaria Hashemi (Persian: زکریا هاشمی; born in 1936 in Rey, Tehran Province, Iran) is an Iranian actor and film director.

== Early life ==
Hashemi spent his childhood in southern Tehran.

== Career ==
He has acted in several films including The Night of the Hunchback, The Brick and the Mirror. He also directed some films, like The Gamble. In the film The Brick and the Mirror (dir. Ebrahim Golestan), Hashemi plays a taxi driver named Hashem who finds a baby in the back of his cab, left by a woman in a black chador (Forough Farrokhzad).

== Filmography ==
As actor:

- South of the City (1958)
- The Night of the Hunchback (1958)
- The Brick and the Mirror (1965)
- Diamond 33 (1966)
- Goodbye Friend (1971)
- Topoli (1972)
- Kaniz (1974)
- Sanjar (1976)
- Charlotte be bazarche miayad (1977)
- Tuti (1978)
- Hokm-e tir (1979)
- Paygah-e jahannami (1984)
- Rooted in Blood (1984)

As director:

- Knucklebones (1971)
- Zan-e bakere (1973)
- Tuti (1978)

== Books ==
- The Parrot
