= The Mission (1983 film) =

1983 film

- Theatrical release poster
- Directed by: Parviz Sayyad
- Written by: Parviz Sayyad; Hesam Kowsar
- Produced by: Reza Aria; Parviz Sayyad
- Starring: Parviz Sayyad; Mary Apick; Houshang Touzie; Kamran Nozad
- Cinematography: Reza Aria
- Edited by: Parviz Sayyad
- Production companies: Aria; N.Y. Film Group
- Distributed by: New Line Cinema
- Release dates: March 30, 1983 (New York New Directors and New Films Festival); May 2, 1984 (limited)
- Running time: 103 minutes
- Countries: United States; West Germany
- Languages: English; Persian

The Mission (Persian: فرستاده, romanized: Ferestadeh) is a 1983 American drama film directed by and starring Parviz Sayyad. It was entered into the 33rd Berlin International Film Festival.

== Plot ==
A young Muslim fanatic from Iran was sent to the United States. S to murder an opponent of the Iran Revolution. When he got to the United States. The clergyman in charge of him chose another target to kill after his target was killed by another assassin. The clergyman claimed that a Savak (Shah's infamous secret police) colonel was his new target. The assassin located the colonel's home and pursued him in search of a chance to finish his mission after Tehran confirmed his new mission. When two young robbers attacked the colonel, the assassin unintentionally saved him. After learning that he was Iranian, the colonel invited him to dinner as a friend. The assassin accepted his invitation, went to the colonel's home, and met his sister-in-law and children. However, the assassin persisted in pursuing the colonel and once discovered him at the clergyman's home. When he questioned the colonel about his relationship with the clergyman, the colonel admitted that he was a Savak colonel whose job it was to recruit.

== Cast ==
- Parviz Sayyad as The Colonel
- Mary Apick as Maliheh
- Houshang Touzie as Agent From Teheran
- Saeed Rajai as Agent From Teheran
- Kamran Nozad as Ghaffar
- Mohammed Ghaffari as His Eminence
- Hatam Anvar as Maziar
- Hedia Anvar as Farzaneh
- Soraya Shayesteh as The Woman
- Richard Mansfield as Mugger
- David Filinni as Mugger
