= Farrokhlagha Houshmand =

Iranian actress (1929–2009)

- فرخ‌لقا هوشمند
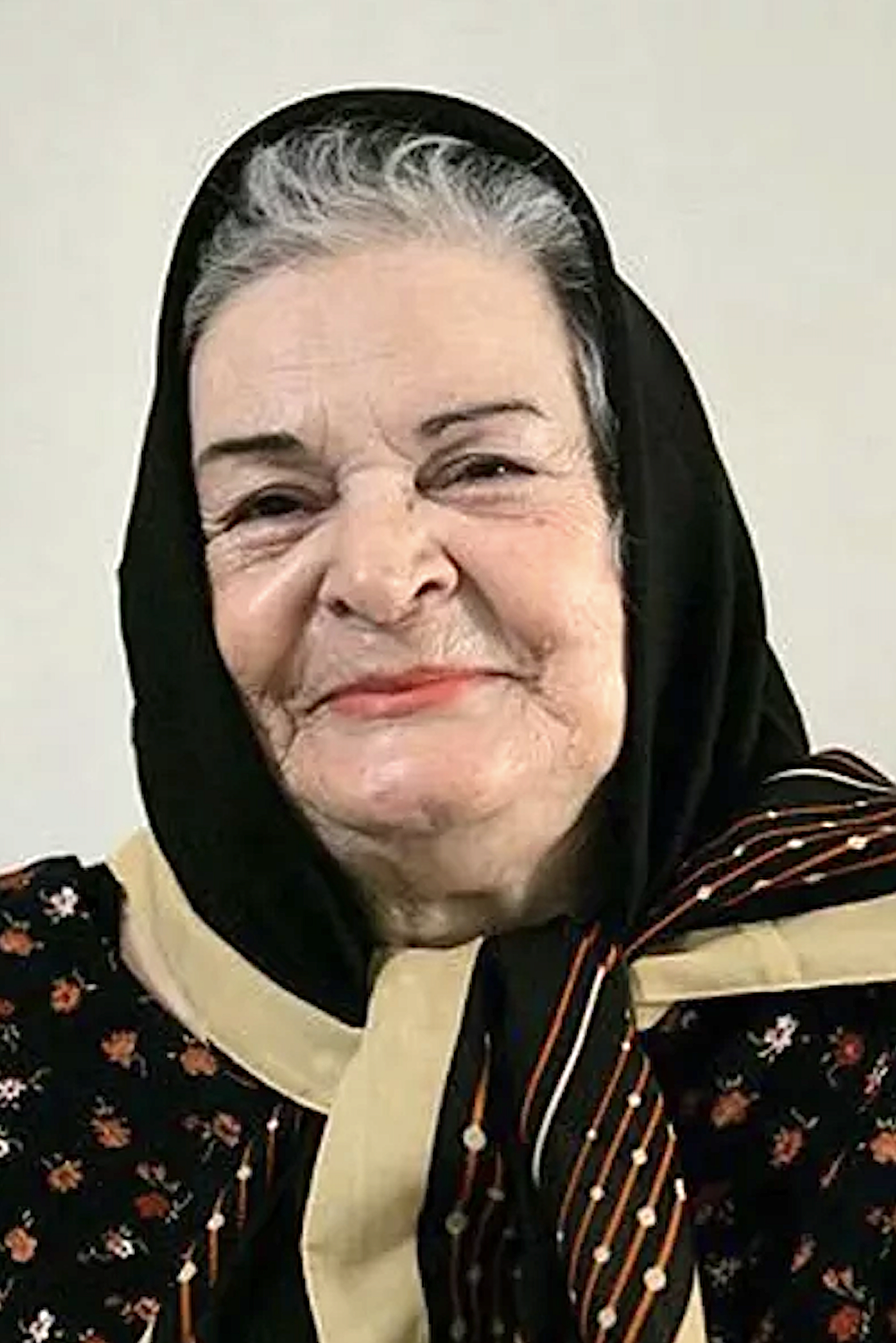
- Born: Farrokh-Lagha Poursol; March 16, 1929; Rasht, Gilan, Imperial State of Persia
- Died: July 13, 2009 (aged 80); Tehran, Iran
- Other names: Farrokh-Lagha Houshmand, Farokhlegha Houshmand, Farrokholqa Poursol, Farrokh Laqa Hooshmand, Farrokh Lagha Houshmand, Farokhlagha Hushmand, Farrokhlaqa Hushmand
- Occupation: Actress
- Years active: 1945–2003
- Spouse: Reza Houshmand

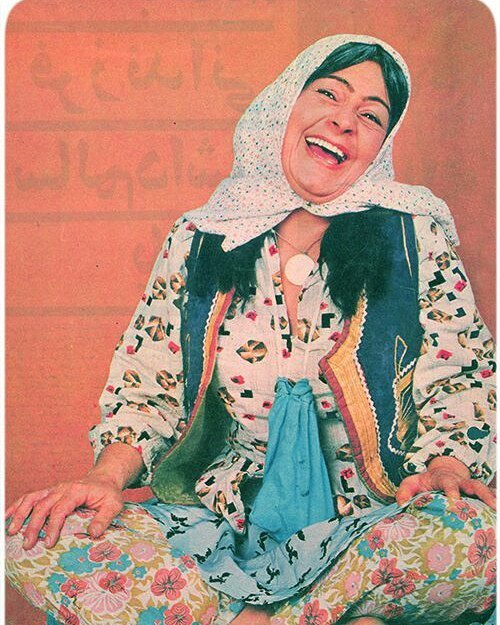

Farrokhlagha Houshmand (Persian: فرخ‌لقا هوشمند; née Farrokh Lagha Poursol; March 16, 1929 – July 13, 2009) was an Iranian actress in film, television, and theater. She appeared in more than 70 movies.

== Biography ==
Farrokh Lagha Poursol was born in 1929 in Rasht, Pahlavi Iran. Her father was one of the founders of the Rasht Theater, and she had initially studied acting as a child in Rasht.

She formally started her acting career in 1945 in the acting academy under the supervision of Ataullah Zahed, Majid Mohseni, and Hamid Ghanbari and she was active in the Gilan Theater.

In 1957, she starred in her first film Ladder of Progress (Persian: نردبان ترقی, romanized: Nardebane Taraghi), a film about a taxi driver that is climbs social status "ladders" when he is mistaken for being a wealthy accountant. In 1966, she started acting in television, starring in a National Iranian Television (NITV) live program with Iraj Nazerian, Ezatullah Moqbeli, and Roghaye Chehreh Azad. She became famous for playing the character "Nene Agha", the mother of the popular television and film fictional character Samad.

== Filmography ==
=== Film ===
- 1957 – Ladder of Progress (Persian: نردبان ترقی, romanized: Nardebane Taraghi)
- 1958 – Ray of Hope (Persian: روزنه امید, romanized: Rowzanehe Omid)
- 1963 – A Star Twinkled (Persian: ستاره‌ای چشمک زد, romanized: Setarei Cheshmak Zad)
- 1963 – Mr. Chameleon (Persian: آقای هفت‌رنگ, romanized: Aghaye Haft Rang)
- 1965 – I Am a Mother (1965 film) (Persian: من مادرم, romanized: Man Madar Hastam)
- 1965 – Night of the Hunchback (Persian: شب قوزی, romanized: Shab-e Quzi), adapted from a story in 1001 Nights.
- 1971 – Samad and the Rug of Hazrat Suleiman (Persian: صمد و قالیچه حضرت سلیمان, romanized: Samad va Ghalicheyeh Hazrat Soleyman)
- 1972 – Samad and the Steel Armored Ogre (Persian: صمد و فولادزره دیو, romanized: Samad va Fulad Zereh Div)
- 1972 – Samad and Sami, Leila and Lily (Persian: صمد و سامی، لیلا و لیلی, romanized: Samad va Sami, Leila va Leili)
- 1972 – Mehdi in Black and Hot Mini Pants (Persian: مهدی مشکی و شلوارک داغ, romanized: Mehdi Meshki Va Shalvarak-e Dagh)
- 1973 – Samad Goes to School (Persian: صمد به مدرسه می‌رود, romanized: Samad be Madreseh Miravad)
- 1974 – Samad Becomes an Actor (Persian: صمد آرتیست می‌شود, romanized: Samad Artist Mishavad)
- 1975 – Samad Becomes Lucky (Persian: صمد خوشبخت می‌شود, romanized: Samad Khoshbakht Mishavad)
- 1977 – Samad in the Way of Dragon (Persian: صمد در راه اژدها, romanized: Samad dar rah ejdeha)
- 1978 – Samad Becomes Homeless (Persian: صمد دربه‌در می‌شود, romanized: Samad Dar-be-dar Mishavad)
- 1979 – Samad Goes to the City (Persian: صمد به شهر می‌رود, romanized: Samad be Shahr Miravad)
- 1989 – Bashu, the Little Stranger (Persian: باشو غریبه کوچک, romanized: Bashu, Gharibeye Koochak), as sister-in-law
- 1995 – The Journey, as character Bibi

=== Television ===
- 1967 to 1970 – Sarkar Ostvar (Persian: سرکار استوار), this was the precursor to the show Samad, she was character "Nene Agha"
- 1974 – The Adventures of Samad (Persian: ماجراهای صمد), character "Nene Agha"
- 1975 – Our Agent is in Danger (Persian: مأمور ما صمد در بالاتر از خطر), character "Nene Agha"
- 1975 – Octopus (TV series) (Persian: اختاپوس)
