= Zhaleh Olov =

Iranian actress, dubber, and poet (1927–2024)

- ژاله علو
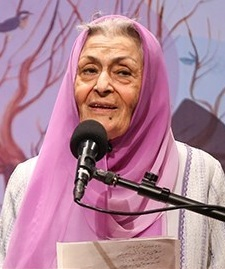
- Olov in 2018
- Born: Shoukat Olov; Persian: شوکت علو; 6 August 1927; Tehran, Persia
- Died: 23 December 2024 (aged 97)
- Occupations: Actress, dubber, poet
- Years active: 1948–2024
- Spouse(s): Nosratollah Mohtasham (divorced); Iraj Razmjoo (divorced)
- Children: Shahrokh Razmjou

Zhaleh Olov (Persian: ژاله علو; 6 August 1927 – 23 December 2024) was an Iranian actress, dubber and poet.

== Life and career ==
Olov was born on 6 August 1927. She started her career working in radio and cinema in 1948, and as an actress in theater in 1949. She made her screen debut in The Tempest of Life (1948, dir. A. Daryabeigi). She dubbed cartoons for the first time in Iran with Walt Disney cartoons, such as Cinderella, Pinocchio, Sleeping Beauty, One Hundred and One Dalmatians, Snow White and the Seven Dwarfs, and The Aristocats.

== Death ==
Olav died on 23 December 2024, at the age of 97.

== Filmography ==
- The Tempest of life (1948)
- The Prisoner of Emire (1948)
- The Spring Variety (1949)
- Aqa Mohammad Khan (1954)
- The Adventure of Life (1954)
- The Bride of Tigris (1954)
- The Accuzation (1956)
- Yaghoub Leyth (1957)
- The Broken Talisman (1957)
- Bijhan and Manijheh (1958)
- The Viper's Fang (1961)
- The White Gold (1962)
- The Key (1961)
- Hookani (1969, unfinished)
- Shirin and Farhad (1970)
- Leili and Majnun (1970)
- Wood Pigeon (Toghi) (1970, directed by Ali Hatami)
- The Window (1970)
- The Bridge (1971)
- Dash Akol (1971)
- The Hour of Disaster (1972)
- The Lollipop (1972)
- The Voice of Desert (1975)
- The Lost Time (1989)
- The Fateful Day (1994)
- The Snowman (1994)
- Sultan (1996)
- Mum's Guest (2003)
- No Choice (2020)

== Television series ==
- Amir Kabir (1985)
- Small Paradise (1991)
- Once Upon a Time (Roozi roozgari) (1991)
- Brighter Than Darkness (1992)
- The Gun Loaded (2002–2003)
