= Marjan (singer) =

Iranian singer and actress (1948–2020)

- مرجان
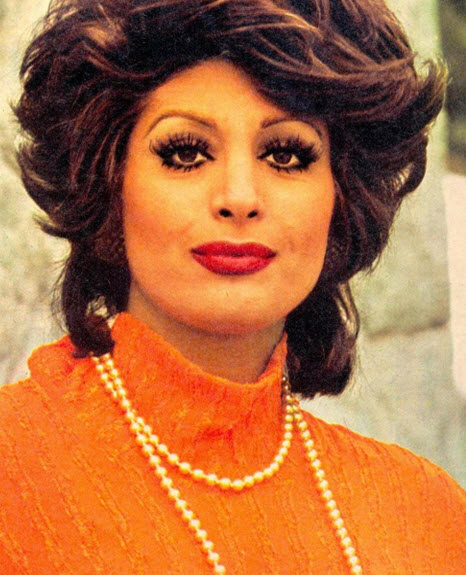
- Born: Shahla Safi Zamir; 14 July 1948; Tehran, Iran
- Died: 6 June 2020 (aged 71); Los Angeles, California, U.S.
- Citizenship: United States
- Occupations: Actress, singer
- Years active: 1969–2012
- Spouse: Fereydoun Jourak
- Musical career
- Genres: Pop
- Instrument: Vocals
- Label: Taraneh Records

Shahla Safi Zamir (Persian: شهلا صافی ضمیر; born 14 July 1948 – 6 June 2020), better known by her stage name Marjan (Persian: مرجان), was an Iranian actress and singer. The Islamic Revolution of 1979 stopped her career and for 27 years she was unable to continue her career.

== Early life ==
Shahla Safia Zamir was born in 1948 in Tehran. Her father, Ali Safi Zamir, was a local director in the Ministry of Transport, and her mother, Kobra Bahmani Tabari, was a primary school teacher. Marjan completed her primary education at Alvand High School. At the age of 12, she was a teenage reporter for "Etelaat Koodkan", a weekly published magazine for teenagers. At the same time she was a narrator for the magazine's weekly TV program. After graduating from high school, she married Mehdi Ali-Mohammadi, (a radio and dubbing narrator). This brought her a daughter, Poopak.

== Professional life ==
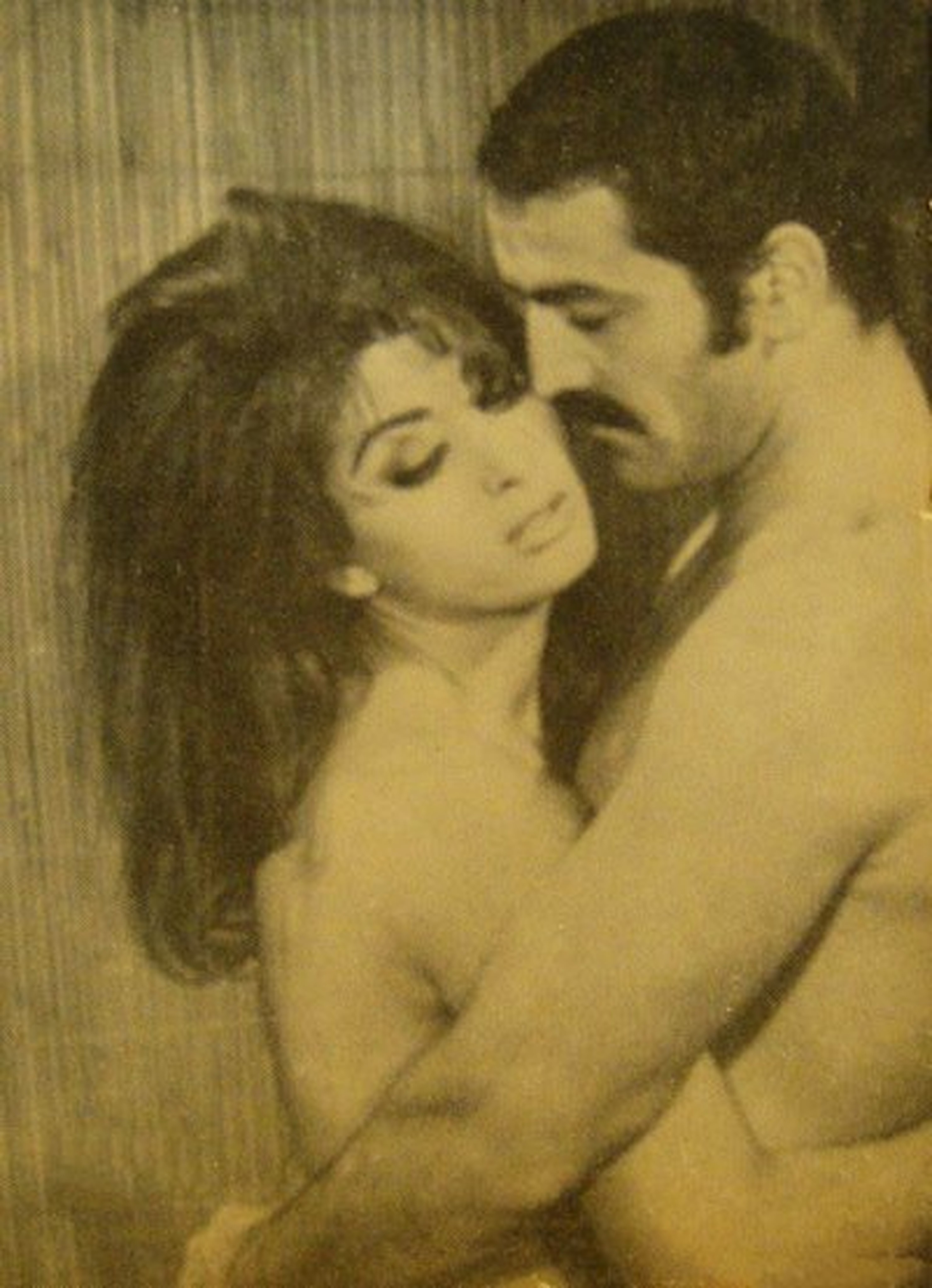
Marjan with Saeed Rad in 1972

Shahla Safia Zamir appeared in cinema at the age of 21, for the first time, in the film The World of Hope, directed by Ahmad Shirazi. At that time, another actress, Shahla Riahi, was known as Shahla, so she chose the stage name of Marjan for herself. Her marriage ended in a divorce and later she married Fereydoun Jourak. Marjan started her career with cinema and took different roles in many movies.

Her husband encouraged her to become a singer, as he discovered that she had a soft and strong voice. The song "Kavir Del" which she adopted from a Turkish singer made her famous. She performed many other songs after that and participated in popular TV shows. She then quit acting and continued with her career of being a singer.

== After the Islamic Revolution ==
The Islamic Revolution in 1979 effectively halted her career. In 1980, two years after Iranian Revolution, Marjan was arrested and imprisoned for performing a song. Again in July 1982 she was arrested charged with supporting the People's Mojahedin of Iran. This time she was detained in Evin Prison until 1990. She, then, left Iran to live the rest of her life in the United States. In 2006 she settled in California. In an interview with Simaye Azadi TV, Marjan said that she and her Husband, Fereydoun Jurak, had been arrested, at their home, on 7 July 1982; and had been detained until early 1990. She also said, In the same interview that despite being released from jail, she had been banned from leaving the country for 17 years.

She fled Iran for Dubai in 2001 and eventually moved on to the United States, where she lived in Los Angeles, California until her death due to complications from surgery on 5 June 2020.

After leaving Iran, Marjan became an activist against the Iranian government and offered her support for of the People's Mojahedin Organization of Iran. "I decided to fight because I have a right to live freely in my own country," She said in an interview on 3 June 2015.

It was after performing a song "Rooyesh Nagozir" at the Organization of Iranian American Communities in Washington, DC, that Marjan started working with other artists in Mojahedin Khalq 's musical group and performed dozens of other songs including: Rooyesh Nagozir, Prohibition, Time to over thrown, what to Say, Evin Says, Let's Build a Homeland, The Martyrs of the city, The Flag, The Silent Scream, Eyes Walking and Unaware, and "we can and we must". Some of these works were made by the Iranian composer Mohammad Shams.

== Death ==
On 6 June 2020, following an operation, Marjan died due to a cardiac arrest. She spent the last years of her life in Los Angeles.

- Maryam Rajavi, leader of the People's Mujahedin of Iran, expressed her condolences. She described Marjan as an example of female artists, "who rose up and fought the regime, are genuine representatives of the suffering of Iranian women and their passionate desire for liberation.” In a statement announcing her death, PMOI (Mojahedin Khalq) declared that She "remained committed to the cause of freedom until the last moment of her life."
- Reza Moeini, the head of the Iran-Afghanistan Office of Reporters Without Borders, wrote about (Shahla Safee Zamir) Marjan's death: An Artist, political prisoners in 1990 died, "Her memory and her voice and her steadfastness against the system of ruin remain with us".

== Professional career ==
=== Discography ===
Her professional career as an Iranian pop singer began with famous poets and composers like Parviz Maghsadi, Fariborz Lachini, Ardalan Sarfaraz, Manoochehr Cheshm Azar, Arash Sezavar, Touraj Shabankhani, Eric Account, Reza Ashari and Mohammad Shams.

Her song, "Kavir-e Del", has been reissued in compilations such as Pomegranates - Persian Pop, Funk, Folk and Psych of the 60s And 70s by Finders Keepers Records (2009) and Khana Khana - Funk, Psychedelia And Pop from the Iranian Pre-Revolution Generation by Pharaway Sounds (2012).

- Kavir-e Del
- Golchin2
- Konsert-e Marjan
- Shabha-ye khatkhati
- Khatereha (Re-recordings of the old songs)
- Seke-ye mah

=== Filmography ===
Film
Year	Film	Role	Director	Notes
1969	Donya-ye poromid			transl. A World Full of Hope
1970	Sekke-ye shans		Iraj Ghaderi	transl. Coin of Luck
1970	Az yad rafteh			transl. The Forgotten
1971	Yek mard, yek shahr	Zhaleh		transl. One man, one city
1971	Gholam zhandarm		Aman Manteghi	transl. Gholam the gendarme
1971	Dalghak-ha			transl. The Clowns
1972	Morgh-e tokhm-tala			transl. Golden egg chicken
1972	Mardi dar toofan		Khosrow Parvizi	transl. A Man in the Storm, with Saeed Rad
1972	Mard-e ejarei			transl. Hired man
1972	Mardan-e khalij	Nezam Fatemi		transl. Men of the Gulf
1972	Khanevade-ye sarkar Ghazanfar		Reza Mirlohi	transl. The family of officer Ghazanfar
1972	Hamisheh Ghahreman		Azizollah Bahadori	transl. Always a hero
1972	Ghadir	Aghdas		transl. Aghdas
1973	Sarab	Goli		transl. Mirage
1973	Keyfar			transl. Punishment
1973	Ghorboone Harchi Khoshgele		Nezam Fatemi	transl. Gholam the gendarme
1974	Salome	Salome	Fereydoun Jourak	with Saeed Rad
1974	Salam Bar Eshgh		Azizollah Bahadori	
1974	Harjayee		Morteza Aghili	transl. Harlot
1974	Agha Mehdi vared mishavad	Parvin	Fereydoun Jourak	
1975	Hemmat			
1975	Ham-ghasam			
1976	Madar joonam aashegh shode	Mehri		transl. My mom has fallen in love
1979	Takye bar baad	Maryam	Fereydoun Jourak	
