= Fereshteh Jenabi =

Iranian actress (1948–1998)

- فرشته جنابی
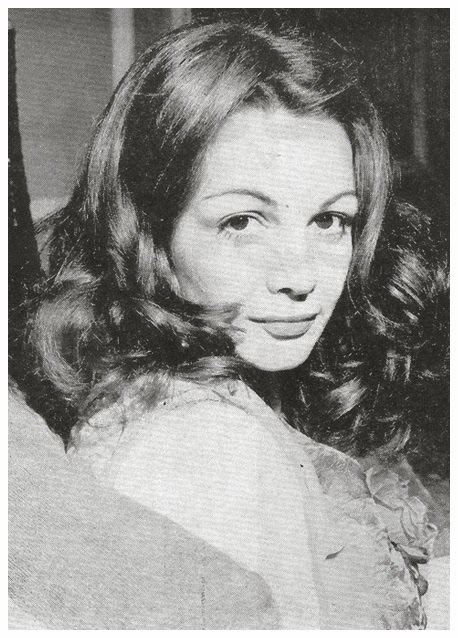
- Born: 1948; Tehran, Iran
- Died: May 25, 1998 (aged 49–50); Tehran, Iran
- Burial place: Behesht-e Zahra
- Occupation: Actress

Fereshteh Jenabi Namin (Persian: فرشته جنابی, born 1948 – May 25, 1998) was an Iranian actress mostly active before the Iranian revolution from 1971 until 1979. She was banned from acting after the revolution and had drug addiction issues. She died on 25 May 1998 at the age of 50.

== Filmography ==
- 1978: Tuti as Tuti
- 1977: The Condemned as Zeynab
- 1976: Speeding naked till high noon
- 1973: Ghiamat-e eshgh as Golrokh
- 1972: Mehdi in Black and Hot Mini Pants
- 1972: Shir-too-shir as Mitra
- 1972: Gozar-e-Akbar
- 1971: Zan-e Yekshabeh
