= Mozaffar (film) =

1974 film

Mozaffar (Persian: مظفر) is a 1974 Iranian comedy film directed by Masoud Zelli and produced by Parviz Sayyad.

== Plot ==
Goli's mother forbids her from marrying Mozafar, a poorly off poet and inventor. Mozafar must defeat Motahar, his wealthy rival, in a sequence of events.

== Cast ==
- Parviz Sayyad as Mozaffar Pour Mozaffar
- Mary Apick as Goli Abagoli
- Nozar Azadi as Mohsen
- Jahangir Forouhar as Motahhar Pour Motahhar
- Mohammad Goudarzi as Mr. Abagoli
- Paridokht Eghbalpour as Mrs. Abagoli
- Mehri Vadadian as Mozaffar's mother
- Ali Zahedi as Seyyed George
- Parvin DOlatshahi as Motahhar's wife
