= Khab Dar Bidari =

Studio album by Farhad Mehrad
- Released: 1993
- Genre: Pop, rock
- Length: 51:45

Farhad Mehrad chronology
Khab Dar Bidari (1993)	Barf (2000)

Khab Dar Bidari (Persian: فرهاد مهراد, Sleep While Awake) is the first solo studio album by Persian rock singer Farhad Mehrad. It was released in 1993. The album combines with mixing Persian and English songs.

== Track listing ==
No.	Title	Title in English	Length
1.	"To Ra Dost Daram I"	I Love You	01:33
2.	"Khab Dar Bedari"	The Waking Dream	06:20
3.	"Khiyale Khoshi"	At Leisure	03:46
4.	"Gonjeshkak"	Cute Tiny Sparrow	03:40
5.	"Najva"	Whispers	03:35
6.	"Khiyale Khoshi (Reza Motori)"	The Lonely Man	03:15
7.	"Don't Let Me Be Misunderstood"		03:15
8.	"Koche Banafsheha"	Violets Migration	06:03
9.	"Yesterday, When I Was Young"		03:52
10.	"The Windmills of Your Mind"		04:22
11.	"Unchained Melody"		03:52
12.	"Yesterday"		03:14
13.	"Hey, That's No Way to Say Goodbye"		02:38
14.	"To Ra Dost Daram II"		01:33
Total length:			51:45
