= The Ghost Valley's Treasure Mysteries =

- film poster
- Directed by: Ebrahim Golestan
- Written by: Ebrahim Golestan
- Starring: Parviz Sayyad; Mary Apick; Jahangir Forouhar; Shahnaz Tehrani; Sadegh Bahrami; Enayat Bakhshi; Loreta
- Cinematography: Ebrahim Golestan
- Music by: Farhad Meshkat
- Distributed by: Golestan Films
- Release date: 1974
- Running time: 137 minutes
- Country: Iran
- Language: Persian

The Ghost Valley's Treasure Mysteries (in Persian: اسرار گنج درهٔ جنی, transliterated as Asrar-e Ganj-e Darre-ye Jenni), also known as Secrets of the Jinn Valley Treasure, is a 1974 satirical comedy Iranian film, directed by Ebrahim Golestan. It was released by Golestan Films, and was Golestan's last feature film in Iran. Using symbolic language, the director was accused of having the Shah's support.

== Plot ==
While plowing his field, a poor farmer, played by Parviz Sayyad, accidentally uncovers an ancient burial chamber loaded with gold artifacts. Realizing that the trove would somehow liberate him from his bumpkin existence, he brings pieces of it to a jeweler in the city. The jeweler, suspecting that the treasure is stolen, sells the pieces to a master fence. In the city the farmer is dazzled by department-store glitter, and he spends his subterranean riches on kitchen appliances, velvet furniture, and lawn statuary. These purchases reach his isolated village by caravan. The man's sudden wealth does not go unnoticed, and his treasure becomes the inevitable quarry of the jeweler's wife, the master fence, the owner of a coffeehouse near his village, and a gendarme on the trail of drug smugglers. The jeweler's wife convinces the farmer that he needs a new wife to go with his new existence and marries him to her virgin servant girl. He also acquires an educated ally to help him spend his wealth. A young Literacy Corps teacher, acting as his lieutenant, conducts public-works projects in the village, commissions an ultramodern home for his patron and hires a painter to paint a wedding portrait of the farmer and his modern bride. The man's dreams of wealth and happiness end when the seismic hand of progress destroys his new home and reburies the treasure.

== Cast and characters ==
- Parviz Sayyad as The farmer; a wise rural man which finds the treasure and sells it to the antique shoppers. He gradually changes into a money-lover and spends his wealth by buying luxurious stuffs. His properties are destroyed by the artificial earthquake and he loses both his wives.
- Mary Apick as Masoumeh, the farmer's wife
- Mani Haghighi as Ali, the farmer's son
- Jahangir Forouhar as Antique Shopper
- Sadegh Bahrami as The jeweller
- Loretta as The jeweller's wife
- Shahnaz Tehrani as the servant and the farmer's second wife.
- Bahman Zarrinpour as Majid, The village's teacher who becomes the farmer's counsellor and assistant. He designs an unusual house on the top of the hill which is destroyed at the end of the film.
- Mahmoud Bahrami as The cafe-shop owner
- Enayat Bakhshi as The Painter
- Mehdi Fakhimzadeh as Coffee-shop garcon
- Mohammad Goudarzi as Gendarme
- Bagher Sahrarudi as the farmer's brother in law
- Reza Hushmand as the mayor (Kadkhoda)
- Mohsen Taghvayi
- Seyyed Yazdi

== Production ==
Ebrahim Golestan did the job of making of the antique sculptures in the movie. He also was the writer and the cinematographer of the film.

== Reception ==
Iranian acknowledged writer and poet, Ahmad Shamlou accused Golestan of having Shah's support in making the film and said: "Shah had realized that there is money in this film, so he was a partner with Golestan himself."

== Restoration ==
The film was restored in 2026 by the Cineteca di Bologna at L'Immagine Ritrovata laboratory. Restoration funding was provided by Iran Heritage Foundation and Cineteca di Bologna. The basis of this 4K restoration was the original camera and sound negatives.
