= The Journey (1995 film) =

- سفر
- Directed by: Alireza Raisian
- Written by: Abbas Kiarostami
- Produced by: Hossein Zandbaf
- Starring: Dariush Farhang; Farokhlagha Hushmand; Fatemah Motamed-Aria
- Cinematography: Farhad Saba
- Edited by: Hossein Zandbaf
- Music by: Kayvan Jahanshahi
- Release date: 1995
- Running time: 96 min
- Country: Iran
- Language: Persian

The Journey (Persian: سفر, romanized: Safar) is a 1995 Iranian film directed by Alireza Raisian and written by Abbas Kiarostami. The film follows Farhad Sadri and his family, as their home in Tehran is bombed during the Gulf War. The family moves to northern Iran, and during their travels they experience special moments.

== Plot summary ==
During the Gulf War, Farhad Sadri and his family are forced to flee Tehran after their home is targeted during a bombing raid. Seeking safety, they embark on a journey toward northern Iran. Throughout their travels, the family navigates the anxieties of war while experiencing transformative and significant moments that reshape their personal bonds and perspectives.

== Cast ==
- Dariush Farhang as Farhad Sadri
- Fatemeh Motamed-Arya as Pari
- Farrokhlagha Houshmand as Bibi
- Amir Pievar as Grandfather Sadri
- Taymaz Saba as Arash Sadri

== Production ==
The film was directed by Alireza Raisian and features a screenplay written by the acclaimed filmmaker Abbas Kiarostami. This collaboration highlights the stylistic intersection of Raisian's direction and Kiarostami's thematic focus on journeys and family dynamics. The cinematography was handled by Farhad Saba, and the film's score was composed by Kayvan Jahanshahi.

== See also ==
- List of Iranian films
