= Bahman Mofid =

Iranian actor (1942–2020)

- بهمن مفید
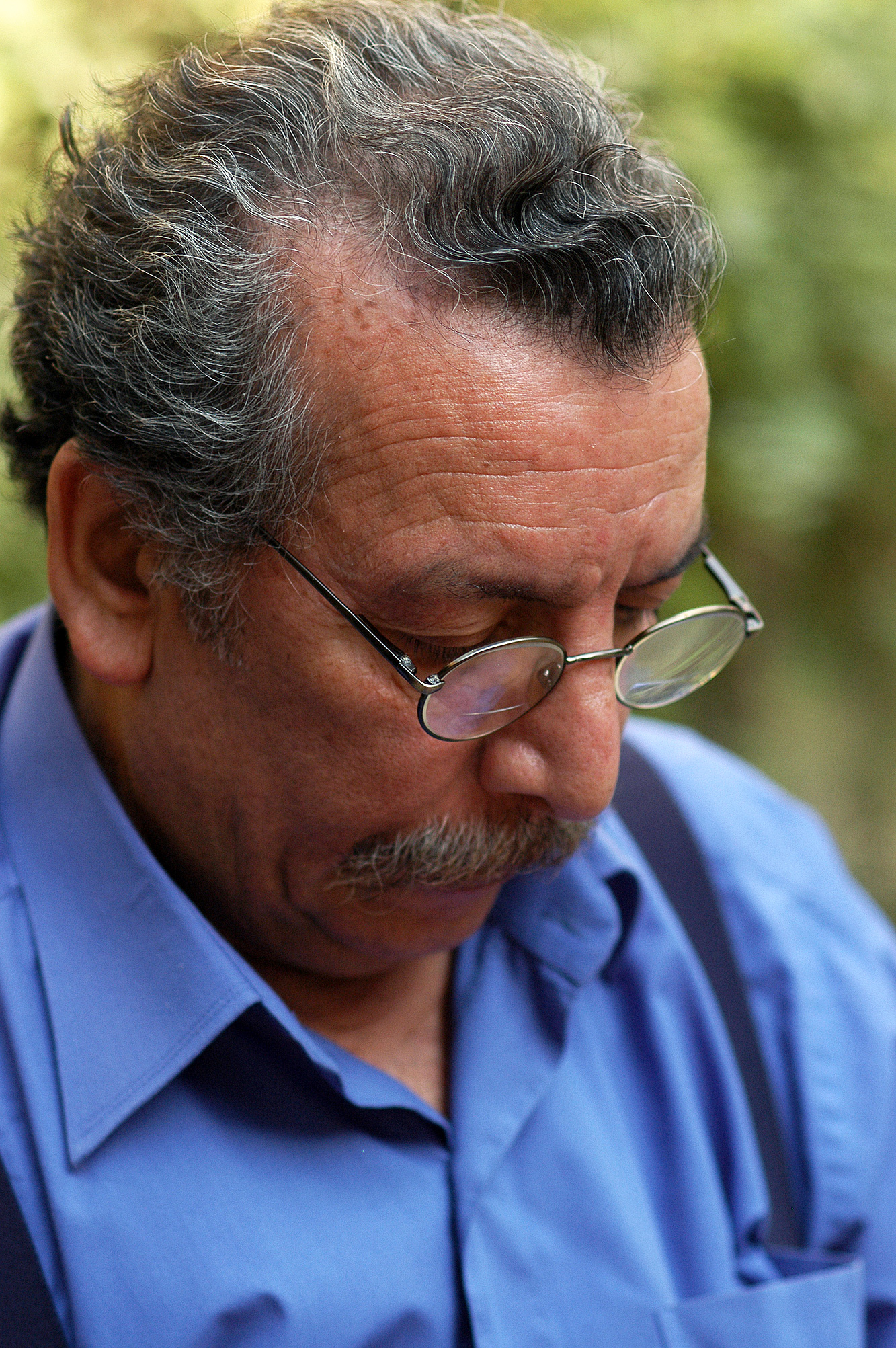
- Mofid in 2017
- Born: Bahman Mofid; 27 July 1942; Tehran, Iran
- Died: 16 August 2020 (aged 78); Tehran, Iran
- Resting place: Behesht-e Zahra Cemetery
- Other name: Bahman Farivar
- Occupations: Actor, singer, voice actor
- Notable work: Qeysar; Reza Motori; Dash Akol
- Spouses: Soraya Helly-Mofid (m. 1968–1985) Sudabeh Mofid (m. 1999)
- Children: Tahamtan Mofid
- Relatives: Bijan Mofid (brother); Hengameh Mofid (sister)

Bahman Mofid (Persian: بهمن مفید; 27 July 1942 – 16 August 2020) was an Iranian superstar, theatre actor, poet, singer and ballet dancer.

== Biography ==
Bahman Mofid was born in Tehran, to father Gholamhossein Mofid a stage director and actor and a pioneer in Iranian modern theatre. His siblings included Bijan Mofid, a playwright; Ardavan Mofid, theatre director and actor; and sister Hengameh Mofid, poet, songwriter, actress, theatre director and playwright. He started acting in childhood, under the direction of his father.

He died on 16 August 2020 after battling cancer.

== Illness and Death of Bahman Mofid ==
Bahman Mofid was diagnosed with lung cancer and underwent treatment for some time. However, he ultimately died at his private residence in Tehran on 16 August 2020. His body was laid to rest in the Artists’ Section of Behesht-e Zahra Cemetery following a funeral ceremony. His grave is shared with Kambiz Samimi Mofakham, an actor and theater puppeteer.

== Filmography ==
- Toofan Dar Shahre Ma (1958)
- Damad Sad Kiloei (1961)
- Gole Gomshodeh (1962)
- Qeysar (1969)
- Reza Motorcyclist (Reza Motori) (1970) – directed by Masoud Kimiai, as "Abbas Ghorazeh"
- Raghase-ye Shahr (1970)
- Wood Pigeon (Toghi) (1970) – directed by Ali Hatami
- Se-Ghap (1971)
- Rashid (1971)
- Pol (1971)
- Faryad (1971)
- Dash Akol (1971) as "Kaka Rostam"
- Baba Shamal (1971)
- Reza Haft-khat (1972) as "Reza Haft-khat”
- Khanevade-ye Sarkar Ghazanfar (1972) as "Akbar"
- Ghalandar (1972) as "Davood"
- Agha Mehdi Vared Mishavad (1974)
- Jooje Fokoli (1974)
- Tuti (1978)
- Faryad-e Mojahed (1979)
- Nafas-borideh (1980) as "Jalil"
- Hejrat (1981) as "Abdol"
- Veiled Threat (1989) as "Haji Firuz"
- Once Upon a Time (1999)

== Voice acting ==
- Ice Age: Continental Drift (2012).
