= Mary Apick =

Iranian actress (born 1954)

- مری آپیک
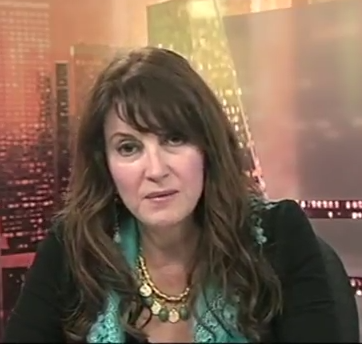
- Born: June 16, 1954 (age 72); Tehran
- Occupation: Actress
- Years active: 1971–present

Mary Apick (Persian: مری آپیک, Armenian: Մերի Ափիկ; born June 16, 1954 in Tehran, Iran) is an Iranian-born stage, television and film actress. In 1979, at the age 18, due to the 1979 Islamic Revolution, she moved to the United States. She won the award for Best Actress at the 10th Moscow International Film Festival for her role in the 1977 film Dead End. She is of Iranian-Armenian ethnicity.

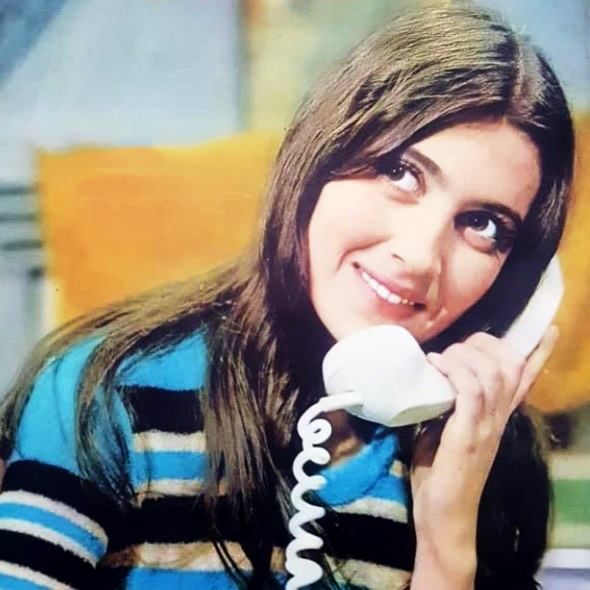
Apick in 1976

In the 1960s, Apick was in the first Iranian-made television program, titled Amir Arsalan, alongside Parviz Sayyad.

In 2019, Apick starred in the movie Samir with Sprague Grayden, Michelle Lukes, and Peter Greene.

== Filmography ==
Year	Title	Role
1971	Dash Akol	Marjan
1974	The Ghost Valley's Treasure Mysteries	Villager's wife
1974	Mozafar	Goli
1977	Bon Bast	The young girl
1983	Ferestadeh	Maliheh
1983	The Right Stuff	Woman Reporter
1986	On Wings of Eagles	Mrs. Nourbash
1987	Checkpoint	Firouzeh
1998	Gohar-e shab cheragh (video)	Andora - Black Fairy/Pari - Good Fairy
2012	I Am Neda (short)	Hajar Rostami
2013	Samira's Show (TV series)	Guest
2013	Homeland	Fariba
2016	Monday Nights at Seven	Beverly
2019	Samir	Zahra
