= Reza Motorcyclist =

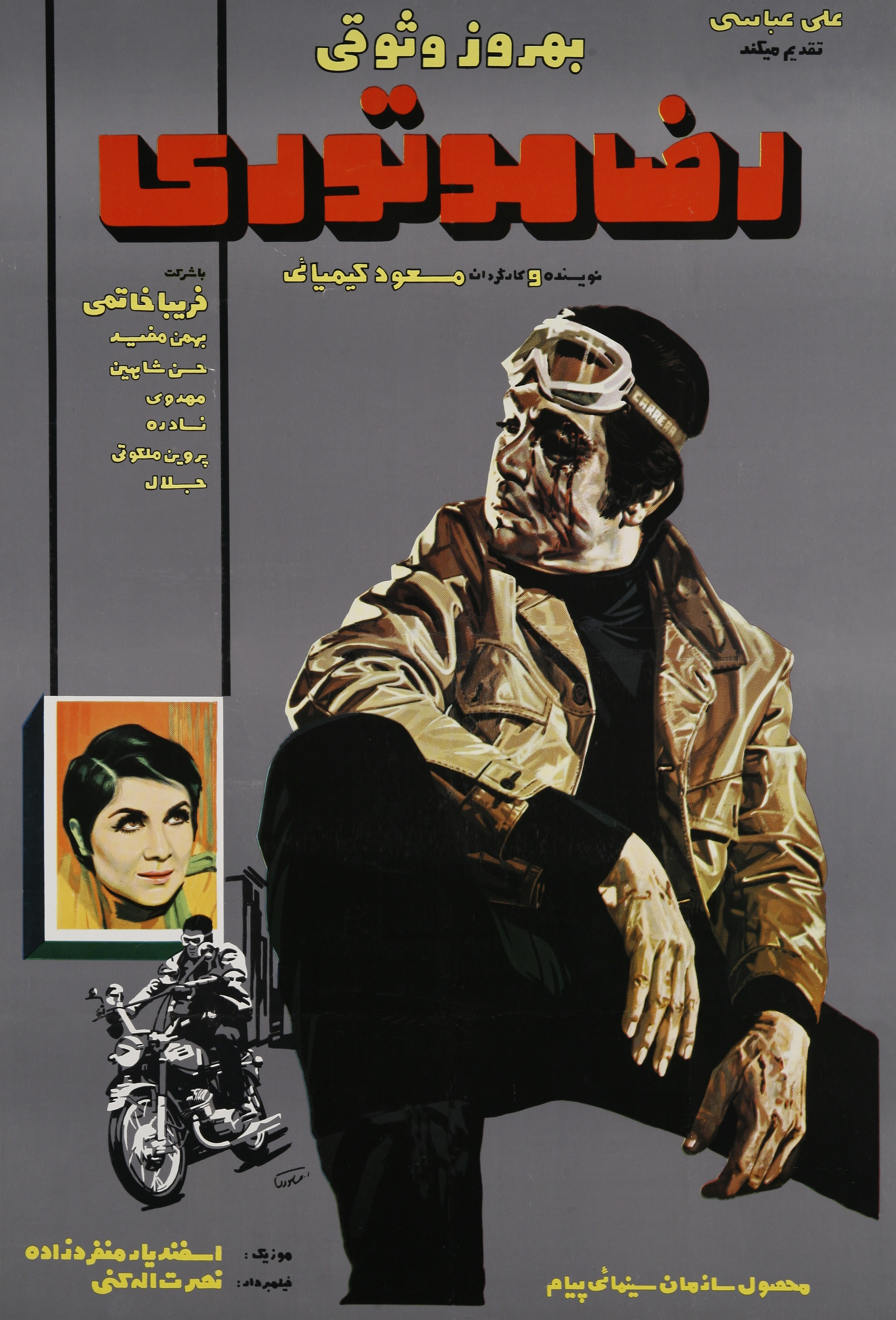
- Directed by: Masoud Kimiai
- Written by: Masoud Kimiai
- Produced by: Ali Abbassi
- Starring: Behrouz Vossoughi; Fariba Khatami; Mahmoud Tehrani; Jalal Pishvaian; Parvin Malakouti; Bahman Mofid
- Music by: Esfandiar Monfaredzadeh
- Release date: 1970
- Running time: 110 minutes
- Country: Iran
- Language: Persian

Reza Motorcyclist (Persian title: Reza Motori; Persian: رضا موتوری; English title alternative: Reza, the Motorcyclist) is a 1970 Iranian drama film directed by Masoud Kimiai and starring Behrouz Vossoughi, Fariba Khatami, Mahmoud Tehrani, Jalal Pishvaian, Parvin Malakouti and Bahman Mofid. This film references Hollywood themes with a "noble rogue" character, which was common in 1970s Iranian films.

== Cast ==
- Behrouz Vossoughi - Reza Motorcyclist
- Fariba Khatami - Farangis
- Hamideh Kheirabadi - Farangis's mother
- Parvin Malakouti - Reza's mother
- Bahman Mofid - Abbas Ghorazeh
