= Naser Malek Motiei =

Iranian actor and film director

- ناصر ملک‌مطیعی
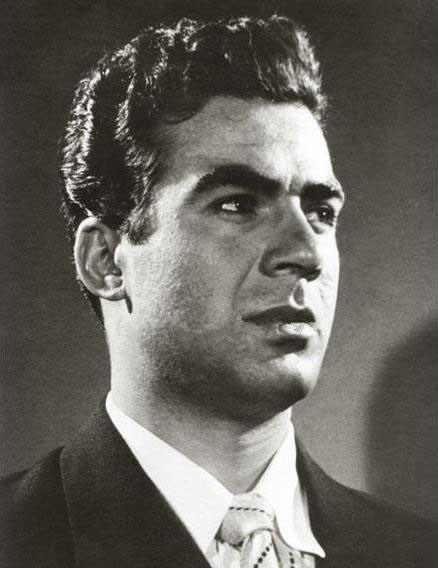
- Malek Motiei in the 1960s
- Born: 12 April 1930; Tehran, Imperial State of Iran
- Died: 25 May 2018 (aged 88); Tehran, Iran
- Resting place: Number 41 Grave, Artists Segment, Behesht-e Zahra Cemetery
- Occupations: Actor; Film director
- Years active: 1947–2017
- Children: 2

Naser Malek Motiei (Persian: ناصر ملک‌مطیعی; 29 March 1930 – 25 May 2018) was an Iranian actor and director. He starred in numerous films and television shows. However, after the Iranian Revolution in 1979, he mostly stopped acting and pivoted into other career choices. On May 25, 2018, Nasser Malek Matiei was admitted to Atiyeu Hospital in Tehran due to kidney problems and died a few days later on June 4, 2018 at the age of 88. His body was buried the next day in the presence of a large number of moviegoers and people in front of the Iran Cinema House and was buried in the artists' plot of Behesht Zahra next to the tomb of Mohammad Ali Fardin.[5][6][7][8]

== Filmography ==
- 1949 Spring Variety Show (Persian: واریته بهاری, romanized: Vareite Bahari)
- 1950 Vagabond
- 1952 The Enchanter
- 1952 Negligence (film)
- 1953 Seventeen Days to Execution
- 1955 Crossroad of Events (Persian: چهارراه حوادث, romanized: Chahar Rah-e Havades)
- 1956 Accusation (film)
- 1958 Broken Spell
- 1958 The Runaway Bride
- 1959 The Twins
- 1959 Woman's Enemy
- 1960 Calm Before the Storm
- 1960 The Stars Glitter
- 1960 The Number One Body
- 1961 Bitter Honey
- 1961 The Bum
- 1961 Uncle No-Ruz
- 1962 The Merchants of Death
- 1962 The Shadow of Fate
- 1962 The Velvet Hat
- 1963 Aras Khan
- 1963 Men and Roads
- 1963 The Polite Ones
- 1964 Abraham in Paris
- 1964 The Pleasures of Sin
- 1965 A Perfect Gentleman
- 1966 Running Away from Truth
- 1966 Hashem khan
- 1966 Hossein Kord Shabestari
- 1969 Qeysar
- 1969 Kölen Olayim
- 1970 Avare asik
- 1970 Wood Pigeon (Toghi) – directed by Ali Hatami
- 1970 Dancer of City
- 1970 The Coin of Luck
- 1971 A Hut across the River
- 1971 Baba Shamal
- 1971 Gholam Zhandarm
- 1971 Kako
- 1971 Knucklebones
- 1971 Looti
- 1971 Noghre-dagh
- 1971 Pahlevan Mofrad
- 1971 The Bridge
- 1972 Ghalandar
- 1972 Mehdi in Black and Hot Mini Pants
- 1973 Sheikh Saleh
- 1973 Riot
- 1974 Agha Mehdi Vared Mishavad
- 1974 Oosta Karim Nokaretim
- 1974 Salat-e zohr
- 1974 Ten Little Indians
- 1974 Soltan-e Sahebgharan (TV mini-series)
- 1974 Torkaman
- 1975 Golden Heel
- 1976 Southern Fire
- 1976 Idol
- 1976 Deprem
- 1977 Baraj
- 1977 Sine-chak
- 1982 The Imperilled
- 2014 Negar's Role
