= Parviz Sayyad =

Iranian actor and film director

- پرویز صیاد
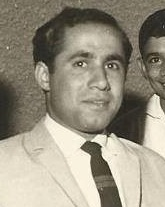
- Sayyad in 1965
- Born: 22 March 1939 (age 87); Lahijan, Gilan Province, Imperial State of Iran
- Other name: Parviz Say'yad
- Education: University of Tehran, City University of New York
- Occupations: Actor, director, translator, screenwriter
- Years active: 1970–present
- Known for: Samad; My Uncle Napoleon
- Spouse: Parvin Sayyad
- Children: 2

Parviz Sayyad (Persian: پرویز صیاد, romanized: Parviz Sayyād; born 22 March 1939) is an Iranian-born celebrated actor, director and screenwriter of Iranian cinema. He was one of the earliest television stars in Iran.

== Early life ==
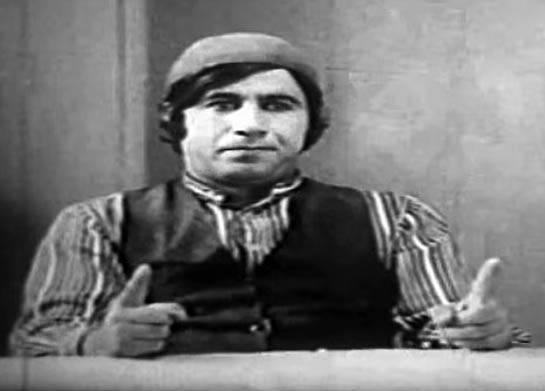
character of "Samad", 1972

Parviz Sayyad was born on March 22, 1939, in Lahijan, Pahlavi Iran.

Throughout the 1960s Sayyad starred in many plays that were adapted for television; and he was in the first Iranian television program titled Amir Arsalan alongside Mary Apick.

== Career in Iran ==
His first film, a comedy, Hasan Kachal (1970), or "Hasan the Bald", is well remembered. He gained more fame starring in one of the oldest Iranian television series Octopus (1975; Persian: اختاپوس, romanized: Okhtapus) playing the role of a well mannered, diplomatic sneaky and soft-spoken board member.

He is best known for his role as Samad on the television series Sarkar Ostvar. The character Samad was a naive, street smart country boy (somewhat reminiscent of the American "Ernest" series). After this, Sayyad went on to star in the famous "Samad" film and television series. His character, Samad (or Samad Agha, as he demanded others call him), was a prominent comedic icon of Iran during the 1970s. The Iranian Revolution took place shortly after his 7th feature-length "Samad" film was released. Sayyad would spend the money he made on commercially successful films (such as Samad) to fund the creation of independent and intellectual films.

His 1977 dramatic film Dead End entered the 10th Moscow International Film Festival. Other noteworthy roles include "Asdollah Mirza" on the television series, My Uncle Napoleon (Persian: دایی جان ناپلئون, romanized: Da'i jan Napuli'un).

== Career in the United States ==
Sayyad migrated to the United States shortly after the Iranian Revolution, where he continued to act, write, direct and produce. He received a PhD from the City University of New York (CUNY).

In 1983, he directed and starred in the film The Mission (Ferestadeh), which was entered into the 33rd Berlin International Film Festival; and won the Jury Grand Prize award (1983) at the Locarno Film Festival.

== Filmography ==
=== Television ===
(As an actor)

- 1967 to 1970 – Sarkar Ostvar (Persian: سرکار استوار), this was the precursor to the show Samad
- 1974 – Kaaf Show (television series)
- 1974 – The Adventures of Samad (Persian: ماجراهای صمد)
- 1975 – Our Agent is in Danger (Persian: مأمور ما صمد در بالاتر از خطر)
- 1975 – Octopus (TV series) (Persian: اختاپوس)
- 1986 – On Wings of Eagles
- 2012 – Homeland, season 3 (television series)

=== Film ===
(As an actor)

- 1970 – Hasan Kachal (Hasan the Bald)
- 1971 – Samad and the Rug of Hazrat Suleiman (Persian: صمد و قالیچه حضرت سلیمان, romanized: Samad va Ghalicheyeh Hazrat Soleyman)
- 1971 – Khastegar
- 1972 – Samad and the Steel Armored Ogre (Persian: صمد و فولادزره دیو, romanized: Samad va Fulad Zereh Div)
- 1972 – Sattar Khan
- 1972 – Samad and Sami, Leila, and Lily (Persian: صمد و سامی، لیلا و لیلی, romanized: Samad va Sami, Leila va Leili)
- 1973 – Samad Goes to School (Persian: صمد به مدرسه می‌رود, romanized: Samad be Madreseh Miravad)
- 1974 – Samad Becomes an Actor (Persian: صمد آرتیست می‌شود, romanized: Samad Artist Mishavad)
- 1974 – Mozaffar
- 1974 – Maslakh
- 1974 – Asrare Ganje Darreye Jenni
- 1975 – Zanburak
- 1975 – Samad Becomes Lucky (Persian: صمد خوشبخت می‌شود, romanized: Samad Khoshbakht Mishavad)
- 1975 – Dar Ghorbat
- 1976 – My Uncle Napoleon (Persian: دایی جان ناپلئون, romanized: Da'i jan Napuli'un)
- 1976 – Bon Bast (Dead End) directed by Parviz Sayyad; art direction and production design by Amir Farrokh Tehrani.
- 1977 – Samad in the Way of Dragon (Persian: صمد در راه اژدها, romanized: Samad dar rah ejdeha)
- 1978 – Samad Becomes Homeless (Persian: صمد دربه‌در می‌شود, romanized: Samad Dar-be-dar Mishavad)
- 1979 – Samad Goes to the City (Persian: صمد به شهر می‌رود, romanized: Samad be Shahr Miravad)
- 1983 – The Mission (Persian: فرستاده, romanized: Ferestadeh)
- 1986 – Samad Goes to War (Persian: صمد به جنگ ميرود, romanized: Samad Be Jang Miravad)
- 1987 – Checkpoint
- 1988 – Samad Returns from the War (Persian: صمد از جنگ برمیگردد, romanized: Samad az jang barmigardad)
- 2005 – Babak and Friends - A First Norooz
- 2008 – The Stoning of Soraya M.
- 2016 – The Persian Connection

(As a director)

- 1978 – Dar Emtedade Shab

== See also ==
- Saeed Khan Rangeela
