= Qeysar (film) =

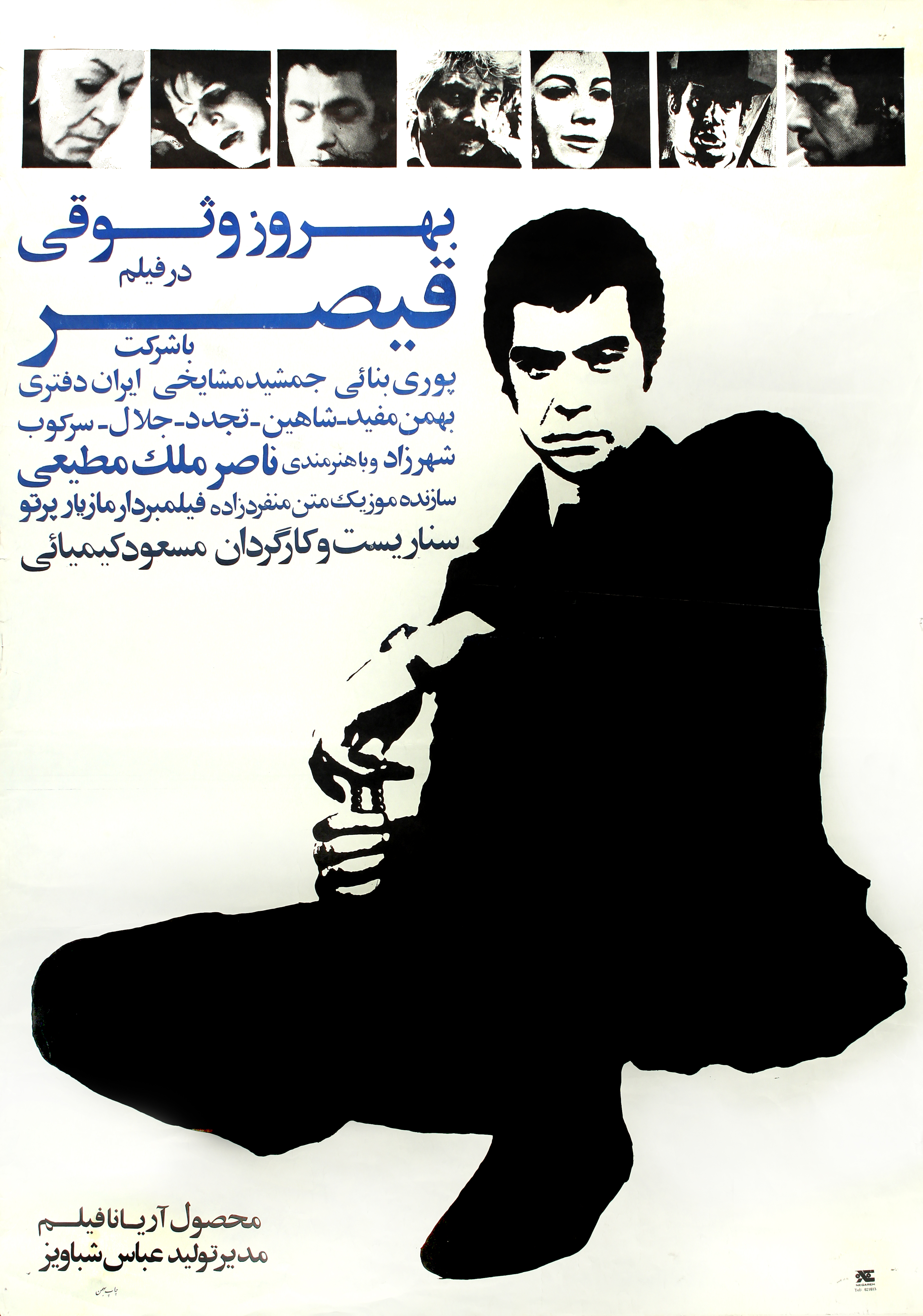
- Directed by: Masoud Kimiai
- Written by: Masoud Kimiai
- Produced by: Abbas Shabaviz
- Starring: Behrouz Vossoughi; Pouri Banai; Naser Malek Motiee; Jamshid Mashayekhi; Bahman Mofid
- Music by: Esfandiar Monfaredzadeh
- Production company: Aryana Film
- Release date: 31 December 1969
- Running time: 100 minutes
- Country: Iran
- Language: Persian

Qeysar (Persian: قیصر; English: Caesar; alternative titles in English include: Qaiser, and Gheisar) is a 1969 film by Iranian filmmaker Masoud Kimiai. The film was considered a "landmark in the Iranian cinema" and led to a new trend for brooding noir dramas in which outraged family honor is avenged.

Behrooz Vossoughi as the eponymous hero Qeysar, became a well known actor in Iranian cinema. Sadegh Khalkhali, an Iranian Shia cleric and politician, spoke openly in 1980 about how the film should no longer to be shown after the Iranian Revolution.

It was remade in Turkish as Alın Yazısı (1972) starring Cüneyt Arkın.

== Plot ==
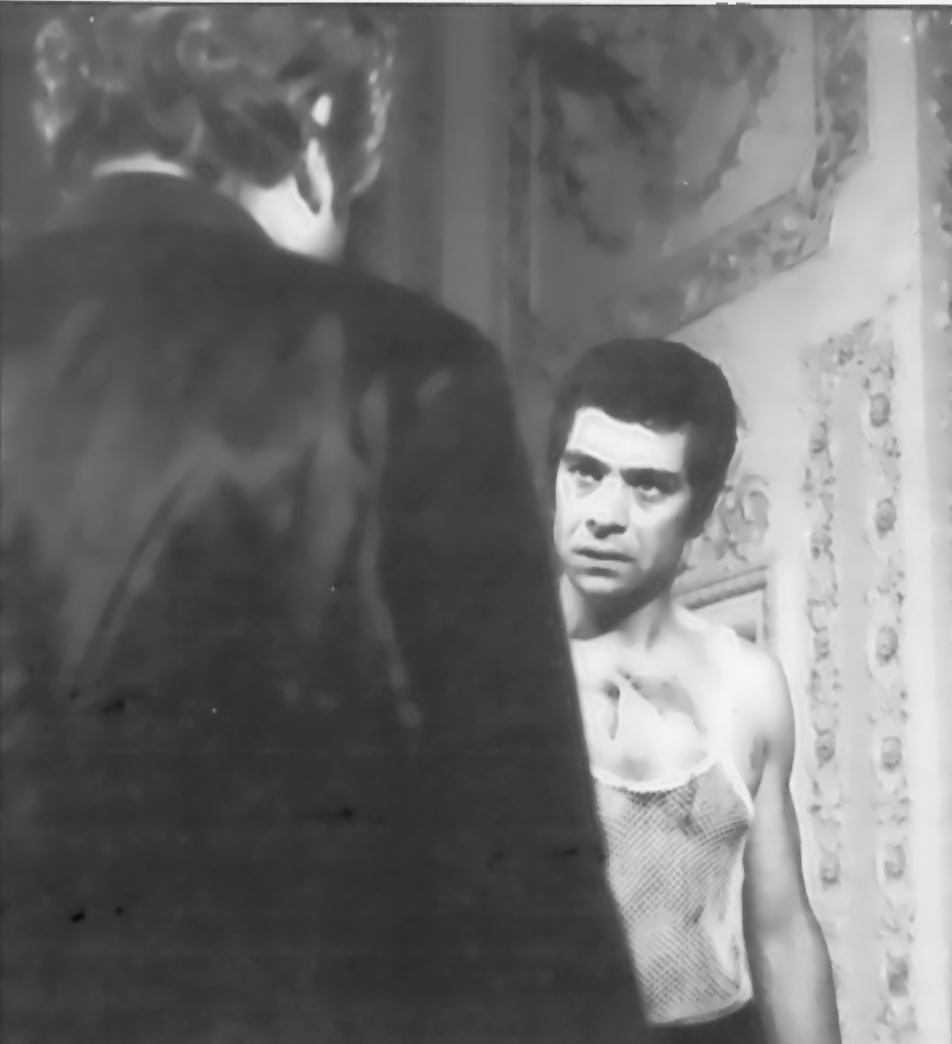
Behrouz Vossoughi in Qeysar, 1969 (film still)

A young woman, Fati, dies in a hospital. Her family is devastated when they discover her death was self-inflicted. She leaves a letter revealing her suicide is a result of being raped by Mansour Ab-Mangol—the brother of a friend who did nothing to stop it. Fati's older brother Farman, an ex street thug who now runs a butcher-shop, decides to confront Mansour. His uncle persuades him not to exact revenge; Farman struggles with his anger, and ultimately decides to give up his knife before confronting Mansour.

Farman's encounter with Mansour quickly degenerates into a fight, as Mansour's two younger brothers, Karim and Rahim, stand back and watch. Farman strangles Mansour, nearly killing the man. Rahim tells Karim to save their brother; Karim furiously stabs Farman, killing him. The three brothers dispose of Farman's body in a wasteland, planting the knife he was stabbed with next to him.

Qeysar, Farman's younger brother who works in Khuzestan, returns home bearing gifts for his family, only to find his siblings dead and his mother and uncle devastated. Despite his uncle's protests, Qeysar decides to take revenge, swearing to kill all three Ab-Mangol brothers one by one. He follows Karim to a public bath, where he stabs him to death in a shower cubicle. He then seeks out Rahim, and finds him working in a slaughterhouse. Qeysar murders Rahim, leaving him butchered amid the cattle.

The revenge spree is set aside when Qeysar is distracted by a former lover, Azam, only until he realizes he must abandon his love to finish off the path of revenge he has started.

Mansour goes into hiding, desperately afraid for his life. By this time the police have realized that Qeysar is the primary suspect in the murders; they pursue him. Qeysar's mother dies, only aggravating matters and strengthening Qeysar's desire for revenge. The police pursue Qeysar at his mother's funeral, but he manages to elude them.

He learns that Mansour has a girlfriend, Soheila Ferdos, an erotic dancer and singer. He visits Soheila and seduces her. She takes him back to her apartment, where he discovers the location of Mansour's hideout, a railway siding. Qeysar makes his way straight for Mansour. Mansour spots him and attempts to escape; Qeysar catches him. The two men fight. Mansour stabs Qeysar, badly wounding him, and flees from the scene.

The Police arrive, forcing Mansour back in the direction he came, back towards the wounded Qeysar, who summons just enough strength to kill Mansour in a final fight.

Qeysar stands tall, but only for a moment. The police spot him and he attempts to flee but is shot in the leg. Badly wounded, he tries to hide in an old train carriage. The police move in on him.

== Cast ==
- Behrouz Vossoughi as Qeysar
- Pouri Banai as Azam
- Nasser Malekmotei as Farman
- Jamshid Mashayekhi as Gheysar's uncle
- Mir Mohammad Tajaddod as Azam's brother
- Bahman Mofid as Mayek
- Iran Daftari as Gheysar's mother
- Jalal Pishvaian as Mansour Ab-mangol
- Gholam-Reza Sarkoob as Rahim Ab-mangol
- Hasan Shahin as Karim Ab-mangol
- Kobra Saeedi as Soheila Ferdos (credited as "Shahrzad")
