= Khodahafez Rafigh =

- خداحافظ رفیق
- Directed by: Amir Naderi
- Production company: Aryana Film
- Release date: 1971 (in Iran)
- Country: Iran
- Language: Persian

Khodahafez Rafigh (English: Goodbye Friend; Persian: خداحافظ رفیق) is a 1971 Iranian film. It was the debut feature by the Iranian director Amir Naderi, and starred Zakaria Hashemi, Jalal Pishvaian and Saeed Rad.

== Plot ==
The plot follows three friends, Jalal, Naser and Khosrow, who organize the burglary of a jewelry shop. This is supposed to be Naser's last crime before he marries. Greed, betrayal and revenge quickly overcome their friendship.

== Cast ==
- Saeed Rad
- Zakaria Hashemi
- Vajesta (Sussan Sarmadi)
- Jalal Pishvaian
- Irene Zazians
