= Iraj Safdari =

Iranian make-up artist

Iraj Safdari ایرج صفدری
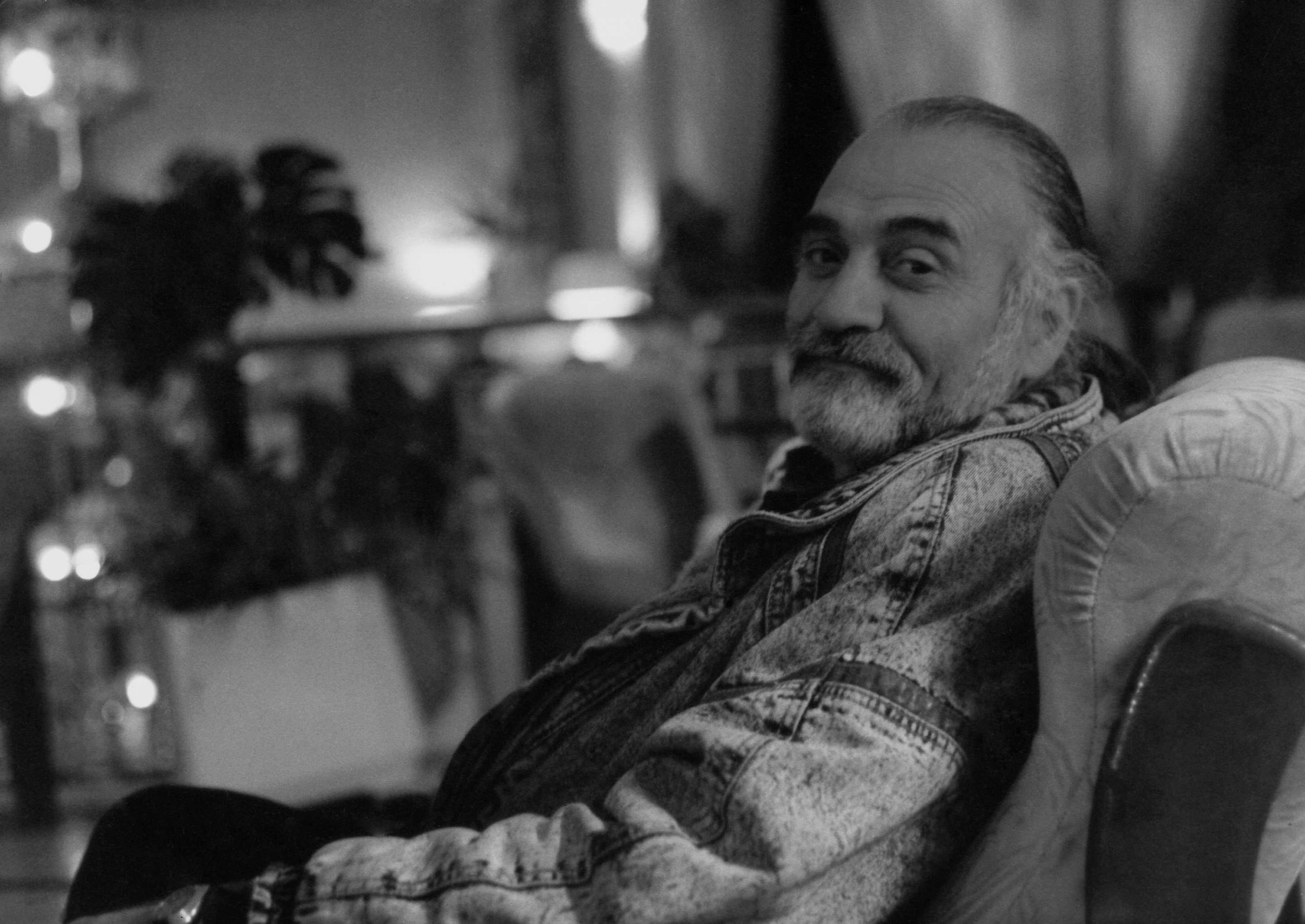
- Born: 5 February 1939; Tehran, Iran
- Died: 23 June 2018 (aged 79); Tehran, Iran
- Occupation: Makeup Artist
- Years active: 1951–2018
- Spouse: Fatemeh Jaferi
- Children: Mozhgan Safdari; Abdollah Safdari; Amir Safdari

Iraj Safdari (Persian: ایرج صفدری; 5 February 1939, Tehran, Iran – 23 June 2018, Tehran) was an Iranian make-up artist and actor. He had three children.

== Career ==
He started his career from 1954, when he was teenager at some famous theater in Tehran such as Pars, Nasr, Dehghan theater and later on Tehran Mosavar magazine. During these years working in theater as a makeup artist and actor, he met and worked with some famous and effective producers and theater owners such as Dr. Fathollah Vala (theater organization director of Iran), Dr. Shervan, Dr. Kooshan, Sarang, Nasrollah Mohtasham, Mahdi Raees Firooz. Later he worked on Barbod Society. He is known as one of the pioneers of makeup art in Iran.

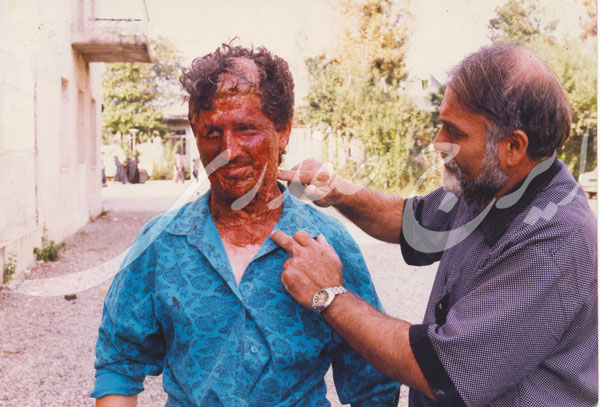
Special Makeup By Iraj Safdari

His first official job was on "Marg-e-Moosh" play, directed by Nosratollah Vahdat on 1954 at Nasr theater. On movie industry on 1955 his first job as makeup artist was on Asemoon-jol movie directed be Nasrollah Vahdat 1955.

In early years after 1979 revolution of Iran, his wife "Fatemeh Jaferi" and his son assisted him on movies. Recently his son Abdollah Safdari has entered the career independently.

Besides his main job, he has proficiency on movie title designing, sfx and some other items.

== Filmography ==
=== Cinema ===
Year	Film (In English)	Local name (In English)	Film (In Persian)	Director	Position
1955	Stroller	Asemoon Jol	آسمون جل	Nosratollah Vahdat	Makeup Artist
1962	Tulip On Fire	Laleh Atashin	لاله آتشین	Mahmood Nozari	Makeup Artist & Movie Title Designer
1963	Mountain Girl	Dokhtar e Kohestan	دختر کوهستان	Mohammad Ali Jafari	Makeup Artist & Movie Title Designer
1963	Passenger From Heaven	Mosaferi Az Behesht	مسافری از بهشت	Nosratollah Vahdat	Actor & Movie Title Designer
1964	Bright Horizon	Ofogh e Roshan	افق روشن	Mehdi AmirGhasem Khani	Makeup Artist & Movie Title Designer
1964	Rural songs	Taranehay e Roostaei	ترانه های روستائی	Saber Rahbar	Makeup Artist
1964	River Direction	Masir e Roodkhaneh	مسیر رودخانه	Saber Rahbar	Makeup Artist & Movie Title Designer
1964	European Doll	Aroos Farangi	عروس فرنگی	Nosratollah Vahdat	Movie Title Designer
1965	Dumb	Zaboon bashte	زبون بسته	Nosratollah Vahdat	Makeup Artist
1965	A Man In The Cage	Mardi Dar Ghafas	مردی در قفس	Nosratollah Vahdat	Makeup Artist & Movie Title Designer
1965	The Great Chance	Shans e Bozorg	شانس بزرگ	Shokrollah Rafiei	Makeup Artist & Movie Title Designer
1966	Alderman's Daughter	Dokhtar e Kadkhoda	دختر کدخدا	Mehdi Raeis Firoz	Makeup Artist & Movie Title Designer
1966	Vel Moa'tali	Vel Moa'tali	ول معطلی	Azizollah Rafiei	Makeup Artist
1966	One Step To Heaven	Yek Ghadam Ta Behesht	یک قدم تا بهشت	Nosratollah Vahdat	Makeup Artist & Movie Title Designer
1967	Merry Go Round	Charkh o Falak	چرخ و فلک	Saber Rahbar	Makeup Artist
1967	Beauty And Champion	Khosgel o Ghahreman	خوشگل و قهرمان	Mehdi Zhourak	Makeup Artist & Movie Title Designer
1967	A Man With No Star	Mard e Bi Setareh	مرد بی ستاره	Azizollah Bahadori	Makeup Artist
1967	Miracle	Mo'jeze	معجزه	Mehdi Mirsamad Zadeh	Makeup Artist
1967	Little One	Nim Vajabi	نیم وجبی	Nosratollah Vahdat	Makeup Artist
1968	A Bridge To Heaven	Poli be Soy Behesht	پلی بسوی بهشت	Mohammad Zarin Dast	Makeup Artist
1968	A Present From India	Tohfeh Hend	تحفه هند	Mehdi Zhourak	Makeup Artist
1968	The Golden Road Of Samarkhand	Jadeh Zarin e Samarghand	جاده زرین سمرقند	Naser Malek Motiee	Makeup Artist
1968	Gipsy Anger	Khashm e Koli	خشم کولی	Esmael Riahi	Makeup Artist
1968	Brave Of Era	Delavar e Doran	دلاور دوران	Ebrahim Bagheri	Makeup Artist
1968	King Of Hearts	Soltane Ghalbha	سلطان قلبها	Mohammad Ali Fardin	Makeup Artist
1968	Husband Hunt	Shekar e Shohar	شکار شوهر	Nosratollah Vahdat	Makeup Artist
1968	20th Century Perch	Looti Gharn e Bistom	لوطی قرن بیستم	Reza Safaei	Makeup Artist
1968	A Man With Two Face	Mard e 2 Chehre	مرد دو چهره	Reza Beyk Imanverdi	Makeup Artist
1969	Gharoon's Sons	Pesaran e Gharoon	پسران قارون	Reza Safaei	Makeup Artist
1969	A World Full Of Hope	Donyay e Por Omid	دنیای پر امید	Ahmad Shirazi	Makeup Artist
1969	Separation	Jodaei	جدایی	Reza Safaei	Makeup Artist
1969	Golden Palace	Ghasr e Zarin	قصر زرین	Mohammad Ali Fardin	Makeup Artist
1969	Blind Cat	Gorbeh e Koor	گربه کور	Sardar Sager	Makeup Artist
1970	Adam & Eve	Adam o Havva	آدم و حوا	Amir Shervan	Makeup Artist
1970	Bald Hassan	Hasan Kachal	حسن کچل	Ali Hatami	Makeup Artist
1970	Chance Coin	Sekke Shans	سکه شانس	Iraj Ghaderi	Makeup Artist
1970	A Man From South Of The City	Mardi Az Jonob e Shahr	مردی از جنوب شهر	Saber Rahbar	Makeup Artist
1970	Three Eye Ruby	Yaghoot e 3 Cheshm	یاقوت سه چشم	Aramaeis Aghamalian	Makeup Artist
1970	Window	Panjereh	پنجره	Jalal Moghadam	Makeup Artist
1971	Wild In The Forest	Vahshi e Jangal	وحشی جنگل	Robert Akhart	Makeup Artist
1971	A Man And a City	Yek mard Yek Shahr	یک مرد یک شهر	Amir Shervan	Makeup Artist
1971	Samad & Solomon's Rug	Samad o Ghaliche Hazrat Soleyman	صمد و قالیچه حضرت سلیمان	Parviz Sayyad	Makeup Artist
1971	Heydar	Heydar	حیدر	Mehdi Zhourak	Makeup Artist
1971	Rashid	Rashid	رشید	Parviz Noori	Makeup Artist
1971	Upside Down Life	Zendegi Varooneh	زندگی وارونه	Nosratollah Vahdat	Makeup Artist
1971	Se Ghap	Se Ghap	سه قاپ	Zakaria Hashemi	Makeup Artist
1971	Gholam Gendarme	Gholam Zhandarm	غلام ژاندارم	Aman Manteghi	Makeup Artist
1971	Fleeing the Trap	Farar Az Tale	فرار از تله	Jalal Moghadam	Makeup Artist
1971	Perch	Looti	لوطی	Khosrow Parvizi	Makeup Artist
1972	Balooch	Balooch	بلوچ	Masoud Kimiai	Makeup Artist
1972	Man	Mard	مرد	Sirous Alvand	Makeup Artist
1972	Stranger	Gharibeh	غریبه	Shapoor Gharib	Makeup Artist
1973	Bandari	Bandari	بندری	Kamran Ghadakchian	Makeup Artist
1973	The Weary Wolf	Gorg e Bizar	گرگ بیزار	Maziar Parto	Makeup Artist
1973	Railroad	Papoosh	پاپوش	Esmaei Pour Saeid	Makeup Artist
1973	Tangsir	Tangsir	تنگسیر	Amir Naderi	Makeup Artist
1973	Rooster	Khoroos	خروس	Shapoor Gharib	Makeup Artist & Actor
1974	Bondwoman	Kaniz	کنیز	Kamran Ghadakchian	Makeup Artist
1974	Honor	Sharaf	شرف	Azizollah Bahadori	Makeup Artist
1975	Desert Voice	Seday Sahra	صدای صحرا	Nader Ebrahimi	Makeup Artist
1975	Swear	Ghasam	قسم	Amir Shervan	Makeup Artist
1975	The Fifth Horseman Of Destiny	Panjomin Savar e Sarnevesht	پنجمین سوار سرنوشت	Saeid Motalebi	Makeup Artist
1976	Mostafa's Mother	Valedeh Agha Mostafa	والده آقا مصطفی	Naser Mohammadi	Makeup Artist
1976	Three Person on a Line	3 Nafar Roye Khat	سه نفر روی خط	Abdoolah Ghiabi	Makeup Artist
1977	Soteh Delan	Soteh Delan	سوته‌دلان	Ali Hatami	Makeup Artist
1977	Safe Place	Jaye Amn	جای امن	Morteza Aghili	Makeup Artist
1977	South Shark	Koose Jonoob	کوسه جنوب	Samouel Khachikian	Makeup Artist & Actor
1977	Middlemen	Vaseteha	واسطه ها	Hasan Mohammad Zadeh	Makeup Artist
1977	To Die For Thousand Time	hezar Bar Mordan	هزار بار مردن	Jalal Mehrian	Makeup Artist
1978	Above Sky s	Bar Faraz Asemanha	بر فراز آسمان ها	Mohammad Ali Fardin	Makeup Artist
1978	Migration	Hejrat	هجرت	Hosein Zadeh	Makeup Artist
1979	Explosion	Enfejar	انفجار	Samouel Khachikian	Makeup Artist
1982	Purgatorial	Barzakhiha	برزخی ها	Iraj Ghaderi	Makeup Artist
1983	Violetland	Banafshe Zar	بنفشه زار	Mohammad Bagher Khosravi	Makeup Artist
1983	The Commander Of Forests	Sardar e Jangal	سردار جنگل (میرزا کوچک خان)	Amir Ghavidel	Makeup Artist & Actor
1984	The Great Brawl	Janjal e Bozorg	جنجال بزرگ	Siavash Shakeri	Makeup Artist
1984	Convicted	Mahkoomin	محکومین	Naser Mohammadi	Makeup Artist
1985	Mirza Nowrooz Shoes	Kafshhay Mirza Norooz	کفش‌های میرزا نوروز	Mohammad Motevaselani	Makeup Artist & Actor
1985	A Man Who Changed To Mouse	Mardi Ke Moosh Shod	مردی که موش شد	Ahmad Bakhshi	Makeup Artist
1986	Suitcase	Chamedan	چمدان	Jalal Moghaddam	Makeup Artist
1986	The Kindness Territory	Harim Mehrvarzi	حریم مهرورزی	Naser Gholamrezaei	Makeup Artist
1986	Highschool	Dabirestan	دبیرستان	Akbar Sadeghi	Makeup Artist
1986	Stone Lion	Shir e Sangi	شیر سنگی	Masoud Jafari Jozani	Makeup Artist
1987	Jamil	Jamil	جمیل	Ahmad Bakhshi	Makeup Artist
1987	Involved	Gereftar	گرفتار	Mansour Tehrani	Makeup Artist
1987	Night Nurse	Parastar e Shab	پرستار شب	Mohammad Ali Najafi	Special Effect
1988	Accident Night	Shab e Hadese	شب حادثه	Sirous Alvand	Special Effect
1988	Bicycle Runner	Bicycle Ran	بایسیکل‌ران	Mohsen Makhmalbaf	Decorator
1988	The Marriage Of Blessed Ones	Aroosi Khooban	عروسی خوبان	Mohsen Makhmalbaf	Decorator
1989	Silent Hunt	Shekar Khamoosh	شکار خاموش	Kiumars Pourahmad	Decorator
1989	Explorer	Jostejoogar	جستجوگر	Mohammad Motevaselani	Makeup Artist & Special Effect
1989	Outcast	Randeh Shode	رانده شده	Jahangir Jahangiri	Makeup Artist
1990	Sea Sound	Avay e Darya	آوای دریا	Rahman Rezaei	Makeup Artist & Actor & Especial Effect
1990	Searching The Island	Jostejoo Dar Jazireh	جستجو در جزیره	Mehdi Sabbagh Zadeh	Makeup Artist & Actor
1991	Victim	Ghorbani	قربانی	Rasool Sadr Ameli	Decorator
1992	Hasanak	Hasanak	حسنک	Mahasti Badiei	Makeup Artist & Actor & Especial Effect
1992	Cease Bloodshed	Khoon Bas	خون بس	Naser Gholamrezaei	Makeup Artist & Special Effect
1992	Mr. Shadi's Mission	Mamoriat Aghay Shadi	ماموریت آقای شادی	Mohammad Reza Zehtabi	Makeup Artist & Actor
1992	Once Forever	Yek Bar Baray Hamishe	یک بار برای همیشه	Sirous Alvand	Special Effect
1993	Never Without You	Bi To Hargez	بی تو هرگز	Hooshang Darvish Pour	Makeup Artist & Decorator
1993	Wallflower Secret	Raz e Gol e Shab Boo	راز گل شب بو	Saeid Khorshidian	Special Effect
1994	Now What ?	Hala Che Shavad	حالا چه شود	Mohammad Jafari Harandi	Makeup Artist
1994	Partner Life	Sharik Zendegi	شریک زندگی	Ali Khosh Neshin	Makeup Artist
1995	Visit Day	Rooz Didar	روز دیدار	Ali Khosh Neshin	Makeup Artist
1995	Law	Ghanoon	قانون	Faramarz Gharibian	Makeup Artist
1995	Seven Pathway	Haft Gozargah	هفت گذرگاه	Jamshid Heydari	Decorator
1997	Saghar	Saghar	ساغر	Sirous Alvand	Special Effect
1997	Devil In The House	Sheytan Dar Khane	شیطان در خانه	Mohammad Reza Zehtabi	Makeup Artist
1998	A Long Day	Yek Rooz Toolani	یک روز طولانی	Ali Shoghian	Makeup Artist
1999	Locomotive Driver	Lokomotiv Ran	لوکوموتیوران	Asghar Nasiri	Makeup Artist

=== TV Series ===
Year	Film (In English)	Local name (In English)	Film (In Persian)	Director	Position
1977	Muggers	Gharatgaran	مجموعه تلویزیونی غارتگران	Mohammad Motevaselani	Makeup Artist
1989	The Light Of The House	Cheragh Khane	مجموعه تلویزیونی چراغ خانه	Manouchehr Pourahmad	Decorator
1996	Lost Paradise	Behesht Gomshodeh	مجموعه تلویزیونی بهشت گمشده	Kamran Ghadakchian	Makeup Artist

=== Theater ===
Year	Film (In English)	Local name (In English)	Film (In Persian)	Director	Position
1958	Ratsbane	Marg e Moosh	نمایش مرگ موش	Dr. Fatollah Vala	Makeup Artist
1962	The August cafe	Ghahve Khane Mah e Uot	نمایش قهوه خانه ماه اوت	Amir Shervan	Makeup Artist

== Awards ==
- Nominated Crystalline Phoenix of Best Special Effect from 8th Fajr International Film Festival For Explorer (Jostejoogar in Local Language).
- Honorary Diploma & The Statue of Sardar e jangal Festival, For Mirza koochak Khan Movie 1983
- Special insignia of "Iranian Theater Forum on 5th ceremony of world theater day for lifetime art activities - 2008

== Ennobled ==
- Ennobled on the Iranian Alliance of Motion Picture Guilds (Khaneh Cinema (in Persian) 2nd Ceremony of Pioneers of Makeup Art - March 2006
- Ennobled on Theater Makeup Society of Iran as a Pioneer Makeup Artist 2008

== Gallery ==
=== Iraj Safdari ===
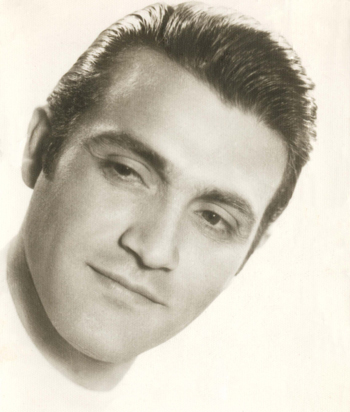

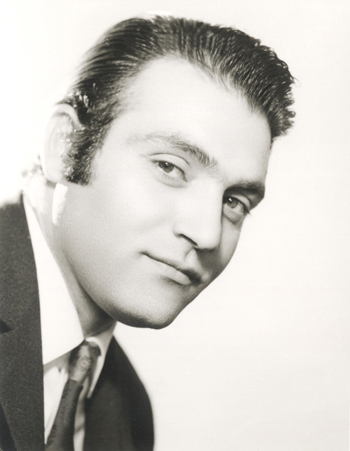

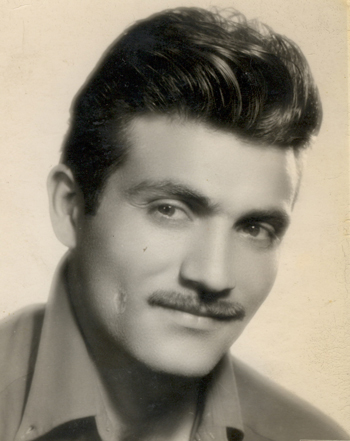

=== Behind Scenes ===
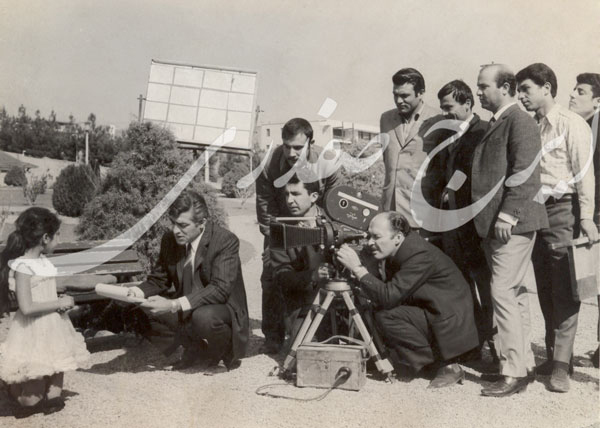
Soltan Ghalbha Behind Scenes

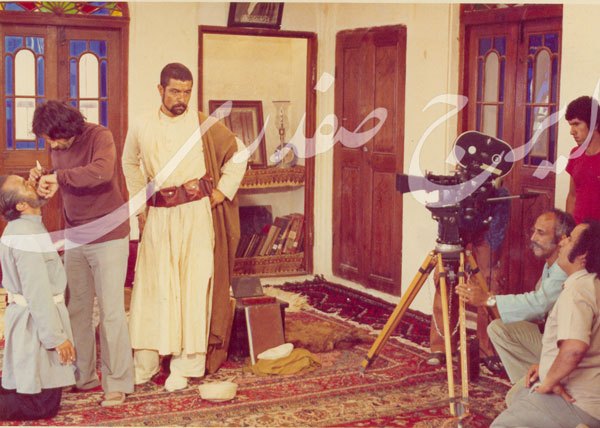
Tangsir Behind Scenes

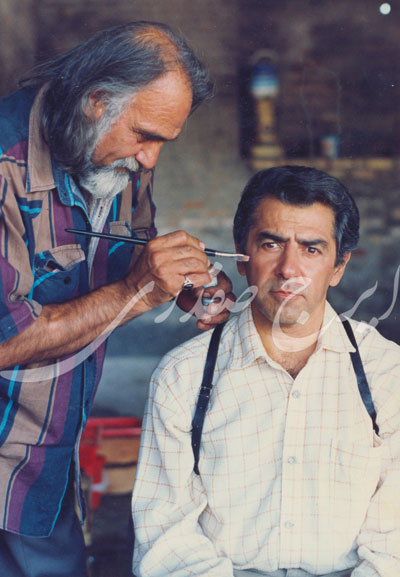
Ghanoon Behind Scenes

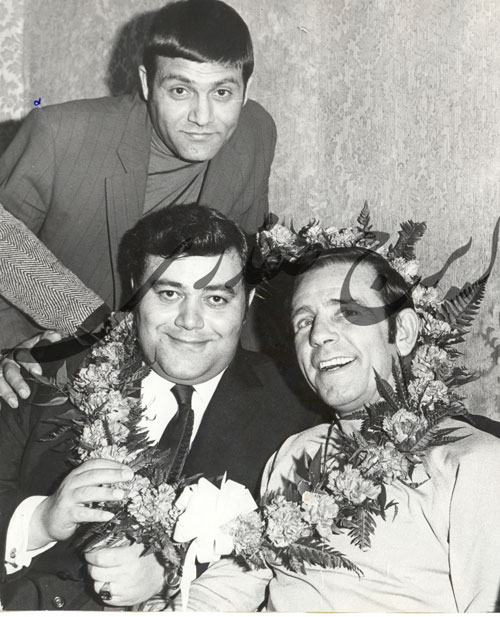
With Norman & Homayoon

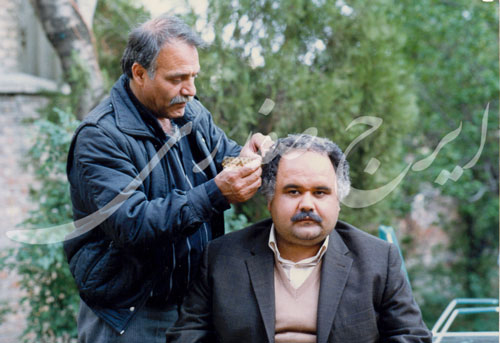
Cheragh Khane Behind Scenes

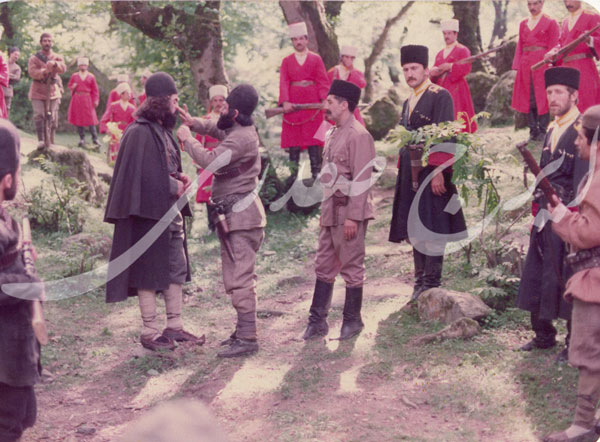
Sardar Jangal Behind Scenes

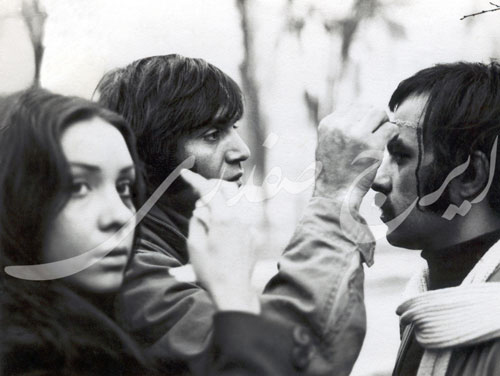
Rashid Behind Scenes

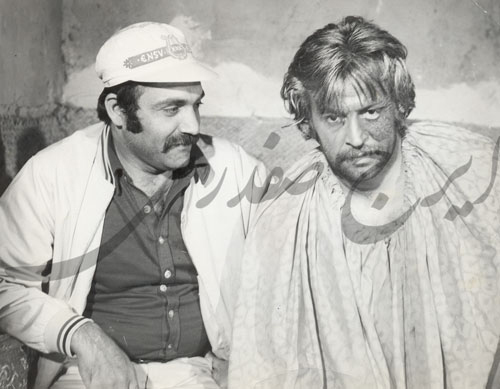
Koose Jonoob Behind Scenes
