= Pouri Banayi =

Iranian actress

Pouri Banai
- پوری بنایی
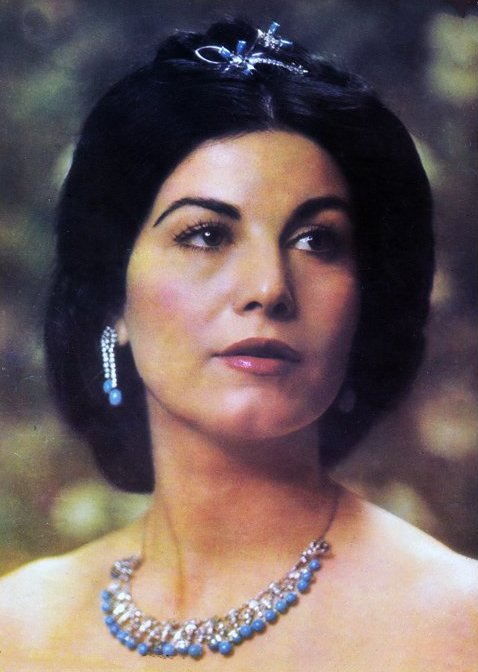
- Born: Seddigheh Banayi; 11 October 1940 (age 85); Arak, Imperial State of Iran
- Occupation: Actress
- Years active: 1964–2008
- Notable work: Qeysar; Malkoçoğlu Cem Sultan
- Partner: Behrouz Vosoughi (1971–1972)

Pouri Banayi (Note: Her family name can also be spelled as, Banai, Banayee, Banyie) (Persian: پوری بنایی; born Seddigheh Banayi Persian: صدیقه بنایی, 11 October 1940) is an Iranian actress. She acted in more than 85 feature films between 1964 and 1979. During her years of acting before the Iranian revolution, she worked with directors such as Mehdi Reisfirooz, Samuel Khachikian, Masoud Kimiai, Farrokh Ghaffari, and Fereidoun Goleh. Her most memorable performances are in Iranian new wave films such as Masoud Kimiai's Qeysar in 1969 and Fereydun Gole's The Mandrake.

She also acted in some foreign films such as Missile X: The Neutron Bomb Incident directed by Leslie H. Martinson in which she co-starred with Peter Graves. In another film directed by Fereydun Gole, named The Moon and a Murmur (1977), she co-starred with John Ireland and Mickey Rooney. Jean Negulesco chose her and Behrouz Vosoughi to play the roles of a couple in his last film The Invincible Six (1970). Jun'ya Sato, the Japanese director chose her for the lead actress in his 1973 adaptation of the manga, Golgo 13.

== Life and career ==
She was born Seddigheh Banayi (in Persian: صدیقه بنایی) in Arak, Iran. She lived there for four years. She has six sisters: Mehri, Akram (Aki), Ashie, Eshie, Masoumeh and Nasrin, all of whom live in California, and one brother, Mohammad, living in Tehran.

Her first feature film was The Foreign Bride, directed by Nosratollah Vahdat. Pouri didn't have any academic education in acting and because Vahdat was a distant relative, he suggested to her to act in his film. In 1967 she co-starred with Behrouz Vosoughi, who was a famous Iranian actor at the time. They cooperated in many films and in 1970 they appeared together in Qeysar, known as one of the major films and a symbol of Iranian new wave. She also co-starred with other superstars of the time such as: Mohammad Ali Fardin, Naser Malek Motiee, Manouchehr Vosugh, Iraj Ghaderi, Ali Nasirian, and Parviz Sayyad. Most of the Iranian movies were dubbed in those days and famous actors and actresses had specific dubbers. Zhaleh Kazemi was Pouri Banayi's dubber. Some of her films, like The Mandrake and The Falconet, in addition to Qeysar and Ghazal are considered milestones in performances of before revolution Iranian cinema.

== Foreign and bilateral films ==
She participated in some foreign and common films during her career, including Leslie H. Martinson's 1978 film, Missile X: The Neutron Bomb Incident; Fereydun Goleh's 1977 film, The Moon and a Murmur, made in the US and Iran; Jean Negulesco's last film, The Invincible Six in 1970; Jun'ya Satō's 1973 adaptation of Golgo 13, which was a joint production of Iran and Japan; and some Turkish films such as Ah bu gençlik (Oh, youth), Tek basina (Loneliness) and Tövbekar (The Regretful).

== After 1979 Revolution ==
Many Iranian actors and actresses left Iran after the 1979 revolution. Although Pouri Banayi was called to the infamous Evin Prison for questioning, she decided to stay in Iran but only appeared as an extra in one feature film after the revolution.

== Filmography ==
Year	Title	Persian Title	Role
1964	The Foreign Bride	عروس فرنگی; Arūse Farangi	Marya
1964	The City Thief	دزد شهر; Dozde Shahr	Farideh
1965	The Forced Vacation	مرخصی اجباری; Morakhasi-ye Ejbāri	The singer
1965	Poor Thing!	زبان‌بسته; Zaban Basteh	Leila
1965	The Blond Woman of Our Town	موطلایی شهر ما; Moo-alaye-ye Shahr-e Mā	Golrokh
1966	Farewell Tehran	خداحافظ تهران; Khodahafez Tehran	Azar
1966	One step to Heaven	یک قدم تا بهشت; Yek Ghadam ta Behesht	Shahla
1966	Hatam-e Taee	حاتم طائی; Hatam-e Tāee	Sharareh
1966	A Man in the Cage	مردی در قفس; Mardi dar Ghafas	Fake Mahin/ Agent
1967	Satan's Temptation	وسوسه‌ی شیطان; Vasvase-ye Sheitān	
1967	A Man from Isfahan	مردی از اصفهان; Mardi az Esfahān	Mahtab
1967	The Fate	سرنوشت; Sarnevesht	Sima
1967	The Golden Cage	قفس طلایی; Ghafas-e Talāyi	Parvin
1968	I Also Cried	من هم گریه کردم; Man Ham Geryeh Kardam	Mandana
1968	The Whirlpool of Sin	گرداب گناه; Gerdābe Gonāh	Pouri
1968	The Wild River	رودخانه‌ی وحشی; Rūdxane-ye Vahshi	Pouneh
1968	The Gypsy's Fury	خشم کولی; Xashm-e Kowli	Gypsy
1968	The Roads of Criminals	جاده‌ی تبهکاران; Jāde-ye Tabahkārān	Giti
1968	The Thief in Black	دزد سیاهپوش; Dozde Siāhpūsh	Fereshteh
1969	Gheisar	قیصر; Gheisar	Azam
1969	Golden Hearts	قلبهای طلایی; Ghalbhā-ye Talāyi	The wife
1969	Blue World	دنیای آبی; Donyā-ye Ābi	Maryam
1969	The Separation	جدایی; Jodāyi	Maryam
1969	Malkoçoğlu Cem Sultan	سرزمین دلاوران; Sarzamine Delāvarān	Melek
1970	Kooche-mardha	کوچه‌مردها; Kūcheh Mardhā	Aghdas
1970	Sin City	شهر گناه; Shahr-e Gonāh	Zohreh
1970	Scandal	رسوایی; Rosvāyi	Maryam
1970	Around the World with Empty Pockets	دور دنیا با جیبهای خالی; Dore Donyā bā Jibhāye Xali	The girl
1970	The Invincible Six	قهرمانان; Ghahremanan	Jahan's wife
1970	The Nameless Knight	فرزند شمشیر; Farzande Shamshir	Gulnaz
1971	The Men of the Dawn	مردان سحر; Mardāne Sahar	Mina
1971	A Beautiful Girl and So Much Trouble	یک خوشگل و هزار مشکل; Yek Xoshgel-o Hezar Moshkel	Mahnaz
1971	Molla Mammad Jan	ملا ممد جان; Mollā Mammad Jān	Safoura
1971	Retaliation	قصاص; Ghesās	La'ya
1971	In the Mall	زیر بازارچه; Zire Bāzārcheh	Goli
1971	Lady for One Night	زن یک‌شبه; Zane Yekshabeh	Afsaneh
1971	The Glass Wall	دیوار شیشه‌ای; Divāre Shishe-ee	Maryam
1971	For Whom the Hearts Beat	قلبها برای که می‌تپند؟ Ghalbhā Baraye Keh Mitapad	Nazi

Year	Title	Persian Title	Role
1971	The Rowers	قایقرانان; Ghāyeghrānān	Reyhaneh
1971	The Rebellion	عاصی; Āsi	Setareh
1971	Bride Price	شیربها; Shirbahā	Golbanoo
1971	Pretty	خوشگله; Xoshgeleh	Zhaleh
1971	The Hell + Me	جهنم + من; Jahannam Be Ezafe-ye Man	The girl
1971	The Only Man in the Neighborhood	تنها مرد محله; Tanhā Mard-e Mahalleh	Ali's sister
1972	Pedar ke na-khalaf oftad	پدر که ناخلف افتد; Pedar Ke Naxalaf Oftad	Parvaneh
1972	Inglorious	نانجیب; Nānajib	Ashraf
1972	Ali, the Coachman	علی سورچی; Ali Sūrchi	Ra'na
1972	A little Prejudice	یک جو غیرت; Yek Jow Gheirat	Accountant's daughter
1973	God Bless Iranian Women	قربون زن ایرونی; Ghorbūne Zane Irūni	Sakineh
1973	Golgo 13	گلگو 13; Golgo Sizdah	Catherine
1973	The Married Man	عیالوار; Ayālvār	Golbahar
1973	Fancy Man	خیالاتی; Xiālāti	Fortuneteller
1973	Happy Go Lucky	خوشگذران; Xoshgozarān	Parvin
1973	The Stranger	بیگانه; Bigāneh	Maryam
1974	Golnesa in Paris	گلنسا در پاریس; Golnesa dar Pāris	Golnesa
1975	The Falconet	زنبورک; Zanbūrak	
1975	The Mandrake	مهر گیاه; Mehre Giāh	Mehri
1975	Ghazal	غزل; Ghazal	Ghazal
1976	Legacy	میراث; Miras	Maryam
1976	The Fire of the South	آتش جنوب; Ātash dar Jonūb	Jamileh
1976	The Lady Wants a Motorcycle / Ah bu gençlik	خانم دلش موتور می‌خواد; Xanom Delesh Motor Mixad	Ra'na
1976	Tek Başına	تنهایی; Tanhāyi	Emineh
1976	Can Pazari	دختر جوان و مرد انتقامجو; Doxtar-e Javan va Marde Enteghamjū	Selma
1977	The moon and a murmur	ماه و همهمه; Māh-o Hemhemeh	
1977	Payback	تلافی; Talāfi	Maryam
1977	Back and Dagger	پشت و خنجر; Posht-o Xanjar	Effat
1977	The Soldier	سرباز; Sarbāz	Mahtab
1977	Tövbekar	توبه‌کار; Towbeh Kār	Ipek
1978	Missile X: The Neutron Bomb Incident	موشک سری; Mushak-e Serrri	Leila
1979	Maryam and Mani	مریم و مانی; Maryam-o Māni	Maryam
2008	Shirin	شیرین; Shirin	Woman in the audience

== Personal life ==
She was engaged to Behrouz Vosughi, but they didn't get married and Vosughi married Googoosh, famous Iranian singer and actress. One of Banayi's sisters is Aki Banayi (Akram Banayi). She was a singer and lived in Los Angeles, prior to her death in 2025.
