= Tangsir =

Tangsir (in Persian : تنگسیر) refers to a person who is originally from a region in Bushehr province between Delvar and Ahram.

Tangsir may also refer to:

- Tangsir (novel), a 1963 Persian novel written by Iranian writer Sadeq Chubak
  - Tangsir (film), a 1973 film based on the novel
