= Hamsafar (film) =

1975 film

- Directed by: Masoud Asadollahi
- Written by: Masoud Asadollahi
- Produced by: Ali Abbasi
- Starring: Behrouz Vossoughi; Googoosh; Reza Karam Rezaei; Asgar Samsar Zadah; Nematollah Gorji
- Music by: Varoujan Hakhbandian
- Release date: 1975
- Running time: 116 minutes
- Country: Iran
- Language: Persian

Hamsafar (Persian: همسفر; Persian pronunciation: [hæmsæfæɾ]) is a 1975 Iranian dramatic-romance film directed by Masoud Asadollah. It stars Behrouz Vossoughi, Googoosh, and Reza Karem Rezaei.

== Plot ==
A wealthy man who has a company deceives a naive girl Atefeh. The latter believing he wants to marry her goes to the north of Iran to find the wealthy man. Later, Atefeh's father gives Ali 70000 Tomans to get her daughter back home but romance blossoms between the two youngsters on their way back.

== Cast ==
- Behrouz Vossoughi as Ali
- Googoosh as Atefeh
- Reza Karam Rezaei as Uncle Rostam
- Asgar Samsar Zadah as Gholam Hossein
- Nematollah Gorji as Servant
- Hamideh Kheirabadi as Nadere
- Fahimeh Amouzandeh as Atefeh's sister
