= Sadeq Chubak =

Iranian novelist, short story writer, playwright and translator (1916–1998)

- صادق چوبک
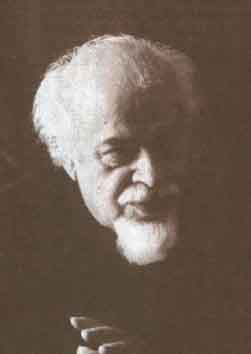
- Sadeq Chubak
- Born: Mohammad Sadeq Chubak; 5 August 1916; Bushehr, Iran
- Died: 3 July 1998 (aged 81); Berkeley, California, United States
- Education: American College of Tehran
- Occupations: Novelist, short story writer, playwright, translator
- Notable work: Tangsir; The Patient Stone
- Spouse: Ghodsi Khanum (m. 1937)
- Children: Roozbeh; Babak (2)

Sadeq Chubak (Persian: صادق چوبک; 5 August 1916 – 3 July 1998) was an Iranian novelist, short story writer, playwright and translator. He is regarded as one of the important figures in the development of modern Persian literature, particularly for his naturalistic fiction and his detailed portrayal of people from marginalised sections of society. His writing is distinguished by its use of colloquial Persian, regional dialects and experimental narrative techniques. His best-known works include the short-story collections The Puppet Show (1945) and The Baboon Whose Buffoon Was Dead (1949), and the novels Tangsir (1963) and The Patient Stone (1966).

== Life ==
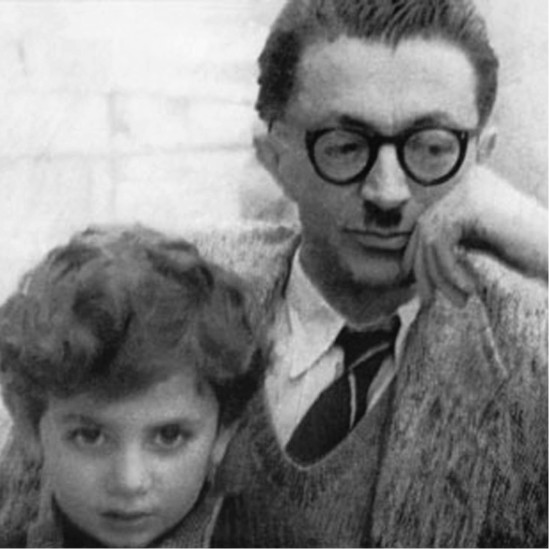
Sadegh Hedayat, his friend, and Rozbeh, his son

=== Early life and education ===
Chubak was born in Bushehr, a port city on the Persian Gulf in southern Iran, on 5 August 1916. His father, Hajj Esma'il, was a prosperous merchant who traded primarily with India and Great Britain. Chubak completed his elementary education in Bushehr and Shiraz, before continuing his secondary education at the American College in Tehran, where he learned English.

=== Employment and professional career ===
In 1937, Chubak was employed by the Ministry of Education and taught at the Sherafat School in Khorramshahr. In 1938, he was drafted into military service. Because of his knowledge of English, he served as a translator at the General Headquarters of the Armed Forces in Tehran.

After completing military service, he worked as a cashier at the Ministry of Finance in 1940 and subsequently served as an interpreter for American economic advisers in Iran. Following the Second World War, he taught English at several schools and language institutes and worked for two years as a translator in the Information Department of the British Embassy in Tehran.

In 1949, Chubak joined the Anglo-Iranian Oil Company. Following the nationalisation of the Iranian oil industry in 1951, he continued working for the National Iranian Oil Company, eventually becoming its head librarian. He retired from the company in 1974.

== Literary career ==
=== The Puppet Show and early short stories ===
Chubak's literary reputation began with the publication of Kheyma-shab-bazi (The Puppet Show) in 1945, a collection of eleven short stories. The collection attracted attention for its portrayal of the unpleasant and often overlooked aspects of everyday life in Iran. Its reception was divided: some critics praised its descriptive precision and controlled narrative technique, while others criticised its naturalistic treatment of social conditions.

The stories frequently focus on people from the lower social classes, including the poor, prostitutes, addicts, children and socially isolated individuals. Chubak's descriptions are generally direct and detailed, with limited background exposition and little explicit moral commentary from the narrator.

One of the stories in the collection, Nafti (translated as The Kerosene Man), concerns a young woman named Ozhra who visits a shrine hoping to find a husband. The story's treatment of female desire and religious behaviour differed from the idealised representations of women common in much earlier Persian fiction.

Another story, Adl (Justice or Inquest), depicts a crowd discussing the fate of a horse with a broken leg. The story illustrates Chubak's use of concise description and dialogue to present a scene without extensive intervention by the narrator.

=== The Baboon Whose Buffoon Was Dead ===
Chubak's second collection, Antari keh lutiyash morde bud (The Baboon Whose Buffoon Was Dead), was published in 1949. It contains three short stories and a one-act play. The title story explores freedom, dependency and oppression through the experience of a domesticated baboon whose master has died. Although the animal escapes, it remains attached to the chain around its neck and eventually returns to captivity.

The collection also includes Qafas (The Cage), which portrays chickens living in the confined and unhygienic conditions of a street vendor's cage, and Why Was the Sea Stormy, a story set in southern Iran. These stories demonstrate Chubak's interest in using animals and ordinary situations to explore broader questions about human behaviour and social conditions.

=== Tangsir ===
Chubak's first novel, Tangsir, was published in 1963. Set in the Tangestan region of southern Iran, the novel tells the story of Zar Mohammad, a rural worker who is cheated out of his savings by four influential men. After failing to obtain justice through legal channels, he decides to take revenge against those responsible.

The story was based partly on an incident Chubak remembered from his childhood in Bushehr. Unlike many of his earlier short stories, which often focus on powerless and socially marginalised characters, Tangsir presents a central character who actively confronts injustice. Its publication marked a shift in Chubak's literary career towards a more heroic and romantic narrative form.

The novel was adapted into the 1974 film Tangsir, directed by Iranian filmmaker Amir Naderi and starring Behrouz Vossoughi. The film was based on Chubak's novel and brought its story to a wider audience.

=== The First Day in the Grave and The Last Alms ===
In 1965, Chubak published Ruz-e avval-e qabr (The First Day in the Grave), a collection of short stories depicting the lives and experiences of disadvantaged individuals. The collection includes The Grave Diggers, The Glass Eye, The Flower Bouquet and Fireworks.

His next collection, Cheragh-e akhar (The Last Alms), was published in 1966. It includes stories such as Atma, My Dog, The Wooden Horse, The Hub Cap Thief and The Last Alms. These works continue his interest in social marginalisation, individual psychology and the effects of poverty and social convention.

=== The Patient Stone ===
Chubak's second novel, Sang-e Sabur (The Patient Stone), was published in 1966. Set in Shiraz during the 1930s, the novel portrays a group of socially marginalised characters whose lives intersect around the disappearance of a woman named Gohar and a series of murders committed by a serial killer.

The novel is structured through the monologues of five characters, each of whom presents events from a different perspective. This use of multiple voices and interior monologue gives the work a complex narrative structure. Literary scholars have compared its techniques with those of American novelist William Faulkner, particularly As I Lay Dying and The Sound and the Fury.

The novel is often regarded as the culmination of Chubak's literary experimentation. Its use of shifting narrative perspectives, colloquial speech, psychological description and characters from marginalised social groups distinguishes it within modern Persian fiction.

== Literary style and themes ==
Chubak is associated with naturalism in modern Persian fiction. His stories frequently depict people living in poverty and difficult social circumstances, including workers, beggars, prostitutes, addicts and other marginalised individuals. Rather than idealising these characters, he presents their actions, surroundings and psychological experiences in detailed and often unsettling ways.

Many of his works are set in southern Iran, particularly in the Persian Gulf region. His descriptions draw on the landscapes, customs and social environments of the region, and often reflect experiences and memories from his childhood in Bushehr. Chubak is considered one of the important writers in the development of regional themes in modern Persian fiction.

A distinctive feature of his writing is his reproduction of spoken Persian. He paid close attention not only to regional vocabulary and pronunciation but also to the syntax and rhythms of colloquial speech. His dialogue gives individual characters distinct voices shaped by their age, background and social environment. Literary scholar Mohammad Reza Ghanoonparvar identifies this attention to colloquial language as one of Chubak's major contributions to Persian fiction.

Chubak's work also challenged idealised depictions of poverty and the assumption that disadvantaged people are necessarily morally virtuous. His stories often portray the ways in which deprivation, social structures and unequal relationships influence human behaviour. His realistic treatment of women, sexuality and social relationships also drew criticism from conservative commentators, particularly because of its departure from conventions in earlier Persian literature.

His narrative techniques varied across his career. Some short stories use concise, almost photographic descriptions of individual scenes, while The Patient Stone employs extended interior monologues and multiple narrative perspectives. These experiments placed his work among the notable formal developments in twentieth-century Persian fiction.

== Translation, drama and poetry ==
In addition to his fiction, Chubak translated works of European and American literature into Persian. His translations included Eugene O'Neill's one-act play Before Breakfast (1945), Arthur Schnitzler's Liebelei (1946), Carlo Collodi's Pinocchio (published in Persian as Adamak-e Chubi in 1955) and Edgar Allan Poe's poem The Raven (1960).

His final published literary work was Mahpara (1991), a Persian rendering of Francis William Bain's A Digit of the Moon. Bain had presented his work as a translation of Sanskrit literature, although he later acknowledged that it was an original imitation rather than a genuine translation. Chubak's Persian version was praised for its prose style and use of language.

Chubak also wrote two plays and a poem, which were published in his short-story collections. His plays include Tup-e Lastiki (The Rubber Ball), a satire reflecting the atmosphere of political uncertainty and suspicion during the reign of Reza Shah, and Hafkhat (translated as Sly), which depicts the experience of a young villager who moves to Tehran in search of a better life. His free-verse poem Ah-e Ensan (The Sigh of Mankind) addresses human suffering across generations.

His works have been translated into several languages, including English, German, Russian and Japanese. English translations include One Man and His Gun, a translation of Tangsir, and The Patient Stone, translated by Mohammad Reza Ghanoonparvar and published in 1989.

== Later life and death ==
Although Chubak generally avoided publicity and rarely gave interviews, he occasionally participated in literary and academic events outside Iran. In 1955, he attended a seminar at Harvard University. In 1965, he visited Moscow, Samarkand, Bukhara and Tajikistan at the invitation of the Soviet Writers' Union. He later taught as a visiting professor at the University of Utah during the 1971–1972 academic year and attended a conference of Asian and African writers in Kazakhstan in 1974.

After retiring from the National Iranian Oil Company in 1974, Chubak spent several years in England. In 1979, he moved to the United States and settled in El Cerrito, near Berkeley, California, where he lived for the rest of his life.

During his later years, Chubak suffered from macular degeneration and lost most of his eyesight. He did not publish further original fiction, although he continued working on unpublished memoirs. He was also an enthusiastic photographer. According to accounts cited by Ghanoonparvar, Chubak destroyed his memoirs and photographs near the end of his life.

Chubak married Ghodsi, one of his classmates at the American College, in 1937. They had two sons, Roozbeh and Babak. Following his death, his personal library and papers were donated to the University of Virginia.

He died in Berkeley, California, on 3 July 1998, aged 81.

== Selected works ==
=== Short story collections ===
- Kheyma-shab-bazi (The Puppet Show, 1945)
- Antari keh lutiyash morde bud (The Baboon Whose Buffoon Was Dead, 1949)
- Ruz-e avval-e qabr (The First Day in the Grave, 1965)
- Cheragh-e akhar (The Last Alms, 1966)

=== Novels ===
- Tangsir (1963)
- The Patient Stone (1966)

=== Translations ===
- Eugene O'Neill, Before Breakfast (Persian translation, 1945)
- Arthur Schnitzler, Liebelei (Persian translation, 1946)
- Carlo Collodi, The Adventures of Pinocchio (Persian translation, 1955)
- Edgar Allan Poe, The Raven (Persian translation, 1960)
- Francis William Bain, A Digit of the Moon, rendered into Persian as Mahpara (1991)

=== Plays and poetry ===
- Tup-e Lastiki (The Rubber Ball)
- Hafkhat (Sly)
- Ah-e Ensan (The Sigh of Mankind)
