= Davoud Rashidi =

Iranian actor

- داوود رشیدی
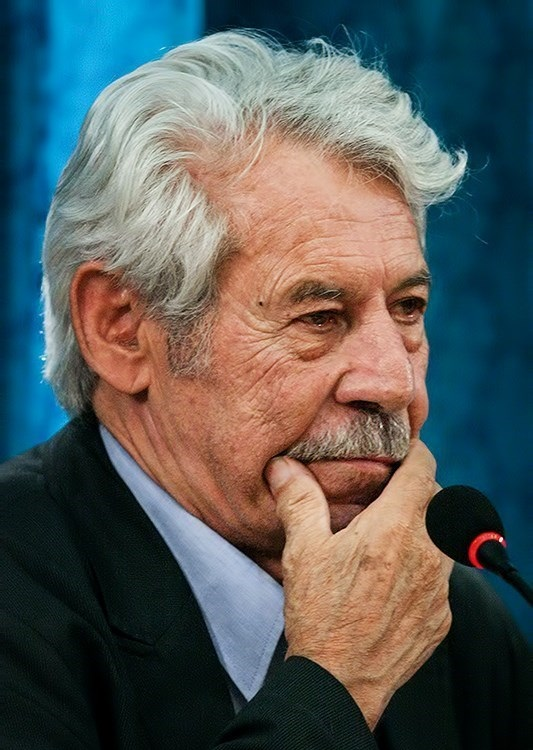
- Rashidi in 2015
- Born: July 16, 1933; Tehran, Iran
- Died: August 26, 2016 (aged 83); Tehran, Iran
- Resting place: Behesht-e Zahra Cemetery
- Education: University of Geneva; Conservatoire de Genève
- Occupations: Actor; filmmaker; producer
- Years active: 1971–2016
- Spouse: Ehteram Boroumand (m. 1968)
- Children: Farhad; Leyli
- Relatives: Marzieh Boroumand (sister-in-law)
- Awards: Order of Culture and Art (1st Class)

Davoud Rashidi (Persian: داوود رشیدی; July 16, 1933 – August 26, 2016) was an Iranian actor. Rashidi, along with Ali Nasirian, Ezatollah Entezami, Jamshid Mashayekhi and Mohammad Ali Keshavarz is known as one of "the five most important actors in the history of Iranian cinema" due to their significant influence. His daughter, Leili Rashidi, is also an actress.

== Career ==
His first film was Escape from the Trap (1971, directed by Jalal Moghadam), which came after years of stage acting. He also had a successful career in television series.

== Selected filmography ==
- Fleeing the Trap (1971) - directed by Jalal Moghadam
- The Beehive (1975) - directed by Fereydun Gole
- Hezar Dastan, 1978–1987, TV series
- Mr. Hieroglyph, 1980
- The Border, 1981
- The Liberation
- The Prize, 1982
- The Spider's House, 1983
- Kamalolmolk, 1984
- The Inner Devil, 1984
- Through the Trap, 1993
- Loneliest Leader, 1997
- Leaning on the Wind, 2000
- Reign of Love (TV series), 2000
- Mokhtarnameh, 2012
- Ekbatan, 2012

== See also ==
- Ibn al-Sheikh, grandfather of Davoud Rashidi
