= Behrouz Vossoughi =

Iranian actor (born 1937)

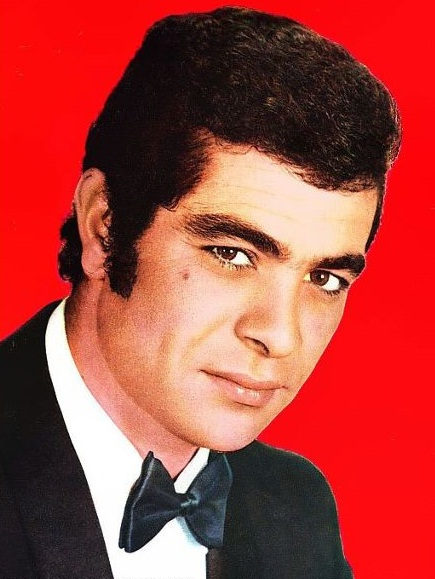
- Vossoughi in 1971
- Born: Khalil Vossoughi; 11 March 1937 (age 89); Khoy, Imperial State of Iran
- Occupations: Actor; model
- Years active: 1958–present
- Political party: Rastakhiz Party (1975–1978)
- Spouses: Googoosh (m. 1975; div. 1976) Katayoun Amjadi (m. 1980)
- Partner: Pouri Banayi (1971–1972)
- Children: 2
- Website: Official Website

Khalil Vossoughi (Persian: خلیل وثوقی; born 11 March 1937) known professionally as Behrouz Vossoughi (بهروز وثوقی), is an Iranian actor. He has also worked in television, radio and theatre. His work has earned him recognition at several international film festivals, including for Best Actor at the International Film Festival of India in 1974 and San Francisco International Film Festival in 2006.

== Personal life ==
Behrouz was born in Khoy, Imperial State of Iran. He moved to Tehran when he was in his teenage years. He has two brothers: Changiz Vossoughi and Shahrad Vossoughi.

Vossoughi was briefly married in the 1970s to the Iranian singer Googoosh. He currently lives in Marin County, California with his wife, Katayoun "Katty" Amjadi (also known as Catherine Vossoughi).

== Career ==
He started acting in films with Samuel Khachikian in Toofan dar Shahre Ma and Abbas Shabaviz's Gole gomshodeh (1962), and became a major star as the brooding hero of the revenge drama Qeysar (1969), directed by Masoud Kimiai. Vossoughi received the Best Actor Award at the Sepas Film Festival for this role.

He went on to collaborate with Kimiai on five more films, including Dash Akol (1971). His next collaboration with Kimiai was The Deer (1974), in which he played the role of Seyed Rasoul. Vossoughi's most acclaimed performance was as Zar Mohamad, a peasant seeking justice in Tangsir (1973) directed by Amir Naderi. In 1975 Vossoughi appeared in The Beehive in the role of Ebi. In 1978, Vossoughi partnered with Ali Hatami in another film, Sooteh-Delan. He was one of the first Iranians to appear in American and European co-productions, such as Caravans (1978), co-starring with Anthony Quinn, Jennifer O'Neill and Michael Sarrazin. He also appeared in The Invincible Six (1970) with Curd Jürgens, and Sphinx (1981) with Frank Langella and Lesley-Anne Down.

In 2000, at the San Francisco Film Festival award ceremony, Abbas Kiarostami was awarded the Akira Kurosawa Prize for lifetime achievement in directing, but then gave it to Vossoughi for his contribution to Iranian cinema. In addition to his acting career, in 2012, Vossoughi was an official festival judge for the Noor Iranian Film Festival. He is currently a judge on Persian Talent Show.

=== Notable films ===
His most famous film works are Qeysar (1969), The Invincible Six (1970), Reza Motori (1970), Dash Akol (1971), Toughi (1971), Deshne (1972), Baluch (1972), Tangsir (1973), The Deer (1974), Zabih (1975), Mamal Amricayi (1975), Kandoo (1975), Hamsafar (1975), Sooteh-Delan (1978), Caravans (1978) and Sphinx (1981).

== Filmography ==
=== Film ===
Year	Title	Role	Director	Notes	Ref(s)
1958	Storm in Our Town		Samuel Khachikian		
1961	The Hundred Kilo Bridegroom		Abbas Shabaviz		
1962	The Lost Flower		Abbas Shabaviz		
1963	An Angel in My House	The Son	Aramais Aghamalian		
1964	The Vagabond Girl		Aramais Aghamalian		
1964	The Pleasure of Sin	Jabbar	Siamak Yasemi		
1965	The Bride of the Sea	Changiz	Armais Vartani Hovsepian		
1966	Farewell to Tehran	Behrouz	Samuel Khachikian		
1966	The Bank Robber		Esmail Koushan		
1966	Twenty Years of Waiting	Majid	Mehdi Reisfirooz		
1966	Hashem Khan	Ali	Tony Zarindast		
1966	Today and Tomorrow		Abbas Shabaviz		
1967	Faith		Mehdi Reisfirooz		
1967	Evil Temptation		Tony Zarindast		
1967	Dalahoo	Borzou	Siamak Yasemi		
1967	A Woman Named Sharab	Mohsen	Amin Shervan		
1968	The Whirlpool of Sin	Behrouz	Mehdi Reisfirooz		
1968	The Red Plain	Bahram	Howard Avedis		
1968	The Black Suit Thief	Hossein Simorgh	Amir Shervan		
1968	Hengameh	Behzad	Samuel Khachikian		
1968	Come Stranger	Amir Hossein	Masoud Kimiai		
1968	The Dragon Gorge		Siamak Yasemi		
1968	It's Written in the Stars		Siamak Yasemi		
1968	I Cried Too		Samuel Khachikian		
1969	Gheisar	Gheisar	Masoud Kimiai		
1969	Blue World		Saber Rahbar		
1970	The Window	Sohrab	Jalal Moghaddam		
1970	Wood Pigeon	Morteza	Ali Hatami		
1970	Reza Motorcyclist	Reza	Masoud Kimiai		
1970	Around the World with Empty Pockets		Khosrow Parvizi		
1970	Layla and Majnun	Gheis	Siamak Yasemi		
1970	The Invincible Six	Jahan	Jean Negulesco		
1971	Fleeing the Trap	Morteza	Jalal Moghaddam		
1971	Dash Akol	Dash Akol	Masoud Kimiai		
1971	A Man and a City	Officer Sharafi	Amir Shervan		
1972	The Dagger	Abbas Chakhan	Fereydoun Gole		
1972	Stranger	Ghasem	Shapour Gharib		
1972	Baluch	Baluch	Masoud Kimiai		
1972	Rashid		Parviz Nouri		
1973	The Soil	Saleh	Masoud Kimiai		
1973	The Curse	The Painter	Nasser Taghvai		
1973	Tight Spot	Zaer Mamad	Amir Naderi		
1973	The Hateful Wolf	Blacksmith	Maziar Partow		
1974	The Deer	Seyyed Rasoul	Masoud Kimiai		
1974	The Compromise	Javad	Mohammad Motevaselani		
1975	Zabih	Zabih	Mohammad Motevaselani		
1975	American Mamal	Mamal	Shapour Gharib		
1975	Fellow Traveler	Ali	Masoud Asadollahi		
1975	The Beehive	Ebi	Fereydoun Gole		
1976	The Idol	Sadegh	Iraj Ghaderi		
1976	Honeymoon	Reza	Fereydoun Gole		
1976	Divine One		Khosrow Haritash		
1976	Iconoclast	Ali Ta'arofi	Shapour Gharib		
1978	Broken	Majid Dokaleh	Ali Hatami		
1978	Cat in the Cage	Bruce Khan	Tony Zarindast		
1978	Breathless	Nabi	Sirus Alvand		
1978	Caravans	Nazrullah	James Fargo		
1981	Sphinx	Menrephtah	Franklin J. Schaffner		
1982	Time Walker	Abdellah	Tom Kennedy		
1989	Terror in Beverly Hills	Abdul	John Myhers		
1989	Veiled Threat	Amir	Cyrus Nowrasteh		
1999	Broken Bridges	Michael	Rafigh Pooya		
1999	The Crossing		Nora Hoppe		
2005	Zarin	Client	Shirin Neshat	Short film	
2012	Rhino Season	Sahel	Bahman Ghobadi		
2015	Farewell My Bird	Old Man	Ameneh Moghaddam	Short film	
2018	Hidden Crimson	Bahram	Payam Jafari	Short film	
2019	Lovely Trash		Mohsen Amiryoussefi	Scenes deleted	

=== Television ===
- Falcon Crest (1981) – directed by Reza Badiyi
- Nightingales (1989) – directed by Reza Badiyi

== Awards and nominations ==
- Winner Statue Sepas for Best Actor Sepas Film Festival – 1969
- Winner Statue Sepas for Best Actor Sepas Film Festival – 1970
- Nominated Statue Sepas for Best Actor Sepas Film Festival – 1971
- Honorary Diploma for Best Actor Tashkent International Film Forum – 1972
- Best Actor Award International Film Festival of India – 1974
- Winner Winged Goat Award for Best Actor Tehran International Film Festival – 1974
- Nominated Winged Goat Award for Best Actor Tehran International Film Festival – 1975
- Nominated Winged Goat Award for Best Actor Tehran International Film Festival – 1977
- Akira Kurosawa Award San Francisco International Film Festival – 2000
- Lifetime Achievement Award San Francisco International Film Festival – 2006
- Lifetime Achievement Award Thessaloniki International Film Festival – 2012
- Special Achievement Award Tokyo Filmex – 2012
- Winner of people's heart, presented by a heart, from a disabled Iranian-American U.S. Army ex-serviceman from Berkeley, California – January 14, 2017
