= Nebahat Çehre =

Turkish actress (born 1944)

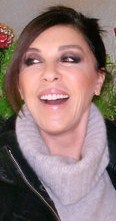
- Born: Hilal Nebahat Çehre; 17 March 1944 (age 82); Samsun, Turkey
- Occupation: Actress
- Years active: 1960–present
- Spouse(s): Yılmaz Güney (m. 1967; div. 1968) Yavuz Demir (m. 1976; div. 1979)

Hilal Nebahat Çehre (Turkish pronunciation: [nebaˌhat tʃehˈɾe]; born 17 March 1944) is a Turkish actress, model, singer and beauty pageant titleholder who was crowned Miss Turkey 1960. She is best known for her protagonist roles as Firdevs Yöreoğlu on the Kanal D drama series Aşk-ı Memnu (2008–10) and as Hafsa Sultan on the series Muhteşem Yüzyıl (2011–12).

As Miss Turkey, Çehre represented Turkey in the Miss World 1960 pageant held in London, United Kingdom. She also represented Turkey in the Miss Universe 1965 beauty pageant which took place on 24 July 1965 at the Miami Beach Auditorium in Miami Beach, Florida, United States.

== Early life and family ==
Hilal Nebahat Çehre was born to a family from Georgia, on 15 March 1944, in Samsun, a city by the Black Sea in northern Turkey. She is of paternal Georgian and maternal Laz descent. Her father, İzzet Çehre, was a building contractor, and her mother, Müzeyyen Çehre, a housewife. After her father's death due to a heart attack, Çehre, along with her family, moved from Samsun to Turkey's largest city, Istanbul, when Çehre was five years old. In Istanbul, Çehre's widowed mother Müzeyyen married a second time to a judge, and then having divorced in 1956, married a third time to a newspaperman Cahit Poyraz in the early 1960s. While recalling her childhood in interviews, Çehre had described herself as having been an extremely shy and startled little girl. Çehre also stated that she had been affected by the early death and absence of her father when she was still very young, and that she found it difficult to accept her mother's remarriages. Çehre would grow up to graduate from Fatih Kız Orta Okulu and Fatih Akşam Kız Sanat Okulu.

Çehre has an older half-brother, Nail Çehre (from a previous relationship of her father), a younger brother named Orhan Çehre, as well as a younger half-brother, Tayyar Yıldız, from her mother's second marriage.

== Marriage ==
=== Relationship with Güney ===
Çehre married film director and novelist Yılmaz Güney on 30 January 1967, at the Hilton Hotel in Istanbul, Turkey. It was the first marriage for each of them. However, their marriage was, at many stages, not without its disputes, troubles or violence. According to witnesses, Güney and Çehre were "madly in love with one another." Abdurrahman Keskiner, who had been Güney's close friend and personal manager and a close acquaintance of both Güney and Çehre during the time, would later describe in an interview that, "they [Güney and Çehre] had a very passionate and intensely vehement love, full of quarrels and beatings. Nebahat would get beaten up a lot by Yılmaz." A particularly renowned incident that had occurred between Güney and Çehre and which has been described by several individuals who knew them, involves Çehre leaving home and boarding a train with her brother Tayyar without the knowledge of Güney, and going to the northwestern Turkish city of Eskişehir, to visit her relatives. Güney, upon discovering this, pursued the train in his car, drove ahead and parked his automobile on the train tracks. As the train reached Güney with a screeching noise, Güney maintained his calm composure, entered the train after it had stopped, got Çehre and took her back home to Istanbul.

At some point during the couple's marriage, Çehre fell pregnant with their child. Upon predicting that the marriage would not continue for a lifetime and taking the instability of their relationship under consideration, Çehre decided that it was best to terminate the pregnancy. This was firmly against Güney's wishes, who ardently wished for Çehre to bear their children, and had even gone so far as to threaten Çehre's doctor. Unbeknownst to her husband, the doctor was later discreetly changed by Çehre, who proceeded with an abortion. Güney approached the doctor and expressed his wish that nothing of the sort should happen again, should any subsequent pregnancies occur.

=== Relationship with Demir ===
Around this time, Çehre met and began a relationship with a basketball player from the Turkish sports club Galatasaray, Yavuz Demir. Through her relationship with Demir, Çehre later explained that "he [Demir] helped me to win over my tendency to become easily startled and frightened which I had lived through at a young age. He caused me to win my self-confidence back." Çehre and Demir married in 1976, this having been the second marriage for Çehre, and the third for Demir, who would marry five times within his life. Çehre always noted how her previous husband Yılmaz Güney and her second husband Yavuz Demir were "the complete opposite to one another", Güney having had "a hot temper", and Demir having had a comfortable, softer, self-controlled and calm personality. At one stage during her marriage to Demir, Çehre fell pregnant, although, sensing that her relationship with Demir was not going to last, she had an abortion. Çehre would later explain that, "I had lost my own father at a very young age and grew up with a step-father. As a small girl I had suffered greatly because of this in a serious form. Because I grew up without a father, I didn't want to raise a fatherless child. I made myself a promise: If I have a marriage that I can carry on with and if it's a happy marriage, I will have my own child." Çehre divorced Demir in 1979, their relationship having had lasted for eight years. Çehre explained in later interviews that, "Our relationship would have continued. I just couldn't become adapted to his [Demir's] life. I'm conservative and confined to my own space. The life that I was living then [with Demir] was extremely active. All those trips, visitors and crowds were drowning me... I understood that I wasn't going to be able to carry on and keep in step with his fast lifestyle..." Demir died in 2006 and Çehre had attended his funeral.

=== Divorce ===
Çehre officially divorced Güney in April 1968, after only fifteen months of marriage. Abdurrahman Keskiner described another incident that occurred within the final days of Güney and Çehre's marriage: "...Yılmaz, Nebahat and I... One day they [Güney and Çehre] had another quarrel at a night club. Nebahat angrily left the club. She didn't pay any attention when Yılmaz said 'stop'. As Nebahat began running towards the hotel that they were staying at in Elmadağ, Yılmaz hopped into his automobile. He angrily passed the steering wheel. Then, in front of my own eyes, he ran over the woman he loved with his car. Nebahat flew up into the air, smashed on to the car and then on to the sidewalk... She stayed in hospital for four days. We hid this [incident] from everybody. Their relationship ended after the incident. But their love never, ever ended." The incident resulted in Çehre having broken her right-collarbone.

Keskiner also went on to continue that, "Within his life, Yılmaz loved Nebahat Çehre the most. He couldn't forget her. His later wife Fatoş Güney would know of this and become angry. Even within his last times in Paris, he said, "Abdurrahman, I can't come back to Turkey. Take care of Nebahat."

Çehre was able to divorce Güney within one law hearing and cited "extreme incompatibility" as the ground for her divorce. After their divorce, Güney was required to do his compulsory military service in the province of Sivas in Central Anatolia. Despite their divorce, however, Çehre would reportedly fly to Sivas every week to visit Güney, and Güney would continue to write love letters to her, expressing his sadness and regret of what he had put her through and noting Çehre's remarkable strength as a woman and actress and his everlasting love for her. Within interviews made during her later life, Çehre would describe that "intense love and passion wears out a relationship... Sometimes things become extremely passionate. Passion brings harm to a relationship... Yılmaz was both a very good and a very difficult husband... I was living the intensity of his love to an unimaginable degree but, at a moment, this can use you up... For us to have lived together seemed impossible, one of us would have vanished. For both of us to have stayed healthy, I thought of it as a definite condition that we separate from one another." Güney would marry a second time to Fatoş Güney in 1970 and, due largely to his increasing "leftist" opinions, would spend most of his remaining life in prison. He escaped from prison in 1981 and flew to Paris, France, where he would die of stomach cancer in 1984. Despite their divorce, Çehre has described herself as "lucky" and regularly calls Güney her "school" and "teacher", explaining that "I learnt about life and the art of acting from him... I began buying and reading my own books... I became a more social person... I began to get to know the people of the country... I learnt to take my job more seriously... My view towards life and the world changed." Their relationship lasted a little over four years. However, Çehre has explained how, at one stage, during her stay in hospital for suffering from jaundice, her former husband rushed to the hospital to see her, and during Güney's years in imprisonment, members of Çehre's family would visit him. Güney had also occasionally telephoned Çehre during his imprisonment. Directly before Güney had escaped to Paris in 1981, he wanted to see Çehre one last time and, when Çehre was set to perform at a casino in Bebek, Istanbul, one evening, as she arrived at the casino, to her great surprise which made her "panic dreadfully", Güney was sitting amongst the audience to see her, alongside his friends. Initially trying to avoid eye contact while singing on stage, Çehre eventually glanced at Güney, who handed his former wife a flower after she approached him and the two shared an embrace. According to Çehre, His [Güney's] intention that night was to reunite. However, I did not want this relationship to begin again. They [the casino's employees] managed to get me away from there.' After their final meeting, Güney died a few years later. Çehre did not attend his funeral, and, despite visiting Paris regularly, frequently suggests that she has never gone to his grave, "I think it's because I want to remember him the last way I had seen him," she said. However, Çehre has stated that, every time she goes to Paris, she and her step-daughter from her first marriage, Elif Güney, come together in meeting, and also meet when Elif Güney visits Istanbul. Çehre regularly comments that she has "great respect for Güney" and that "had Yılmaz [Güney] lived today, we would have been very good friends. Because every time I had a headache, he would rush immediately to be by my side."

== Early modelling career ==
Çehre's professional career began with modelling. In 1960, at the age of only fifteen, Çehre was selected as "Miss Turkey" and was requested to represent Turkey in the Miss World pageant of that year in London, England. In later interviews, Çehre stated that at the time she was still a very young girl who hadn't matured yet, that she had never found herself attractive and that to have been chosen to represent Turkey in the beauty contest greatly surprised her. When asked, "How did you decide to enter the beauty contest?" Çehre responded: "I had only just turned fifteen years when I entered the contest. I actually didn't really want to enter, but I was at the side of my friend and her older sister, who were entering the contest, and they made an offer to me, too. My mother had an interest in beauty and the models. When I told her of the offer, she wanted me to accept it. I entered the contest and came first."

Furthermore, after having always been called by her original first name Hilal, Çehre was enrolled into the pageant with only her middle name and surname, and would officially become known as Nebahat Çehre. Çehre also worked for a short amount of time at the side of an architect as a secretary.

The opportunity to have represented Turkey in the Miss World pageant brought about the offers for Çehre to play in films, under Turkey's then-leading film industry, Yeşilçam. Çehre had a role within a play at a children's theatre, however, she was unable to get paid.

Without previously ever having had an interest or desire to work as an actress, Çehre debuted in her first film, Yaban Gülü, or "The Wild Rose", at the age of seventeen in 1962, and also did modelling from this time. However, Çehre did not like her screen character and described her character as a "rich and spoiled girl". She was determined not to act in any more films, although unexpectedly she was offered to play the role of a lawyer in another film afterwards, and was glad to accept the offer. Çehre continued to act in many more films after that point of time, her most notable Yeşilçam films including Acı Hayat, or "Bitter Life" (1962) and Kral Arkadaşım, "The King Is My Friend" (1964).

== Acting ==
The turning point of both Çehre's professional and personal life would occur in 1964. During that year, she was offered to play the leading female role in a film called Kamalı Zeybek, where the renowned Kurdish actor Yılmaz Güney was set to play the leading male role and who had also written the film's scenario script. Having had found the scenario very affective and having had liked it very much, Çehre gladly accepted the offer. Çehre and Güney were set to meet one another for the film one day, and Çehre would later describe in interviews that when she met Güney, she felt that she had been "hit by a forceful emotion" and that for both her and Güney, there was "a charge of electricity" and it was love at first sight. Both Güney (aged thirty) and Çehre (aged nineteen) would fall in love with each other within the duration of a couple of weeks of the filming and Çehre would later describe that she was extremely happy and had found the "man of her life". However, Çehre's happiness was to be short-lived when she had discovered that Güney was living with another woman (Can Ünal), who had reportedly been of assistance to him when Güney had gone into prison for publishing a "communist" novel. Çehre described that, upon discovering this, "within a moment my dreams had been ruined, I was ripped to shreds... He [Güney] explained everything to me, but I didn't want to accept anything and broke off[from him]." Çehre was then sent to Miami, USA, for the Miss Universe beauty pageant. Upon her return to Turkey, she found that there was "a rain of film offers from Yeşilçam", with one of these film offers having had been to play at the side of Güney once again, in a film called Dağların Oğlu, or "Son of the Mountains" (1965). Çehre accepted, after which she described that she and Güney were "no longer able to break off from one another." At this point of time, Can Ünal fell pregnant with Güney's child, and gave birth to his daughter, Elif Güney, in 1966. Despite Ünal's pregnancy and birth, Güney and Çehre remained together and agreed to get married. Güney, due to his tough posture and actions, earned himself the nickname of "Çirkin Kral" (Ugly King). Çehre, due to her modelling in the Miss World pageant, was known as "Güzellik Kraliçesi" (Beauty Queen). This contrast shared between Güney and Çehre has always been noted.

Çehre's romantic relationship with Güney also led to a turning point within her own acting career. Güney was an actor who also wrote film scripts and would sometimes even direct his own pictures. Between the years 1964 to 1968, Güney and Çehre would act in up to fourteen films together, side by side. Çehre would describe in later interviews, "within the films that I acted in with Yılmaz, I would portray the roles of Anatolian, impoverished women." Çehre greatly appreciated this due to previously always having been had suited by producers to female characters who were "rich, spoiled and pampered." Çehre also personally admired Güney's extremely skilled acting abilities, his effective film scripts and film directing style. Çehre's personal favourite and most notable film with Güney is Seyyit Han (1968), a simple love story amidst economic difficulties of rural life.

Another notable film that Güney and Çehre had made was Eşrefpaşalı (1966), in which one particular scene between Güney and Çehre has always been discussed by film critics and has continued to be portrayed and imitated in several other Turkish films and soap opera shows. The scene involved Güney shooting a glass off his then-girlfriend Çehre's head with a gun. The film's producer, Abdurrahman Keskiner, described the scene as such: "Cinema historians would say of this [scene] to be made up from a tale. But it's true! On that day, out of the three guns that I had on me, Yılmaz wanted the one that had actual bullets inside. At this point Nebahat was crying, trembling and begging the man she loved in tears, 'Yılmaz, it's not possible, I won't do it. Don't use a real bullet, I'm begging you! I didn't find my life in the streets. At the slightest wrong movement I could die.' Yılmaz wasn't concerned. He put the glass on Nebahat's head. Then he stood twenty metres away. There was a deathly silence on the set. Everyone was holding their breath in fear, looking at the trembling Nebahat who was at the foot of the wall. The poor girl was as if she was little suspecting of the disaster that awaited her. Yılmaz pulled the trigger, and the glass was smashed to smithereens. Nebahat began to cry... Yılmaz calmed her down with difficulty. He took her to the corner of the beach and said some things."

== Singing career ==
After her divorce from Güney, Çehre continued to act in a large amount of Yeşilçam films, which she had taken a break from while married to Güney. However, within the 1970s, the creation of sex films were dramatically increasing within Turkish cinema. At this time, Çehre chose to do professional stage singing instead. Her singing abilities were first recognised by the prominent Turkish singer, songwriter and music composer, Zeki Müren. Çehre explained, "I was walking on the shore with Zeki Müren... He asked me why I hadn't gone on to the stage and at a moment, asked me to sing a song for him. I got embarrassed, 'How can I do this next to you?' I said. When he insisted, I sang 'Kırmızı Gülün Alı Var' ['The Red Rose Has A Deception']. He liked it, 'Amazing', he said. I held on to this job tightly, I embraced music seriously. I got lessons from the best teachers and I took my first step on to the stage in 1970." Çehre made her first stage performance at the Lunapark Casino in Ankara, Turkey.

== Filmography ==
- 1960: Taş Bebek
- 1961: Yaban Gülüm
- 1962: Memnu Meyva
- 1962: Meçhule Gidenler
- 1962: Gümüş Gerdanlık
- 1962: Aşk Bekliyor
- 1962: Acı Hayat
- 1962: Kanun Kanundur
- 1962: Esir Kuş
- 1962: Sevimli Serseri
- 1962: Zorla Evlendik
- 1963: İki Vatanlı Kadın
- 1963: Çiçeksiz Bahçe
- 1963: Barut Fıçısı
- 1963: Bize de mi Numara
- 1964: Avanta Kemal
- 1964: İki Sene Mektep Tatili
- 1964: Güzeller Kumsalı
- 1964: Çöpçatanlar Kampı
- 1964: Dev Adam
- 1964: Kral Arkadaşım
- 1964: Affetmeyen Kadın
- 1964: Kamalı Zeybek
- 1964: Lekeli Aşk
- 1964: Dağ Başını Duman Almış
- 1965: Dağların Oğlu
- 1965: Silaha Yeminliydim
- 1965: Şoförün Kızı
- 1965: Kardeş Belası
- 1965: Melek Yüzlü Caniler
- 1965: Silahların Sesi
- 1965: Pişkin Delikanlı
- 1965: İçimizdeki Boşluk
- 1965: Dokuz Canlı Adam
- 1966: Kırık Hayatlar
- 1966: Aslanların Dönüşü
- 1966: Yalnız Adam
- 1966: İntikam Fırtınası
- 1966: Büyük İntikam
- 1966: Dövüşmek Şart Oldu
- 1966: Eşrefpaşalı
- 1966: Kibar Haydut
- 1966: At Avrat Silah
- 1966: Yedi Dağın Aslanı
- 1966: Çirkin Kral
- 1967: Felaket Kuşu
- 1967: Balatlı Arif
- 1967: Eşkiya Celladı
- 1967: Çirkin Kral Affetmez
- 1968: Pire Nuri
- 1968: Hacı Murat Geliyor
- 1968: Korkusuz Yabancı
- 1968: Parmaksız Salih
- 1968: Malkoçoğlu Kara Korsan
- 1968: Aşkların En Güzeli
- 1968: Kızıl Maske
- 1968: Beyoğlu Canavarı
- 1968: Toprağın Gelini
- 1968: Seyyit Han
- 1969: Demir Pençe
- 1969: Zorro'nun İntikamı
- 1969: Zorro Kamçılı Süvari
- 1969: Zorro'nun Kara Kamçısı
- 1969: Zorro Dişi Fantoma'ya Karşı
- 1969: Yayla Kızı Gül Ayşe
- 1969: Talihsiz Gelin
- 1969: Sürgünler
- 1969: Kirli Yüzlü Melek
- 1969: Dikenli Hayat
- 1969: Demir Pençe Casuslar Savaşı
- 1969: Namluda Üç Kurşun
- 1969: Çılgınlar Cehennemi
- 1969: Yılan Soyu
- 1969: Ringo Vadiler Kaplanı
- 1969: Ölüm Şart Oldu
- 1969: Nisan Yağmuru
- 1969: Namus Fedaisi
- 1970: Fatoş Talihsiz Yavru
- 1970: Adsız Cengaver
- 1970: Yaşamak İçin Öldüreceksin
- 1970: Müthiş Türk
- 1970: Günahsız Katiller
- 1970: Ecelin Gölgesinde
- 1970: Ana Gibi Yar Olmaz
- 1970: Kaderin Pençesinde
- 1971: Sürgünden Geliyorum
- 1971: İntikam Kartalları
- 1971: Elmacı Kadın
- 1972: Kan Dökmez Remzi
- 1972: Alçaklar Cehenneme Gider
- 1972: Aynı Yolun Yolcusu
- 1974: Beş Tavuk Bir Horoz
- 1975: Yarış
- 1985: Kahreden Gençlik
- 1986: Güneşteki Leke
- 1987: Eski Sevdalar Gibi
- 1988: Kimlik
- 1988: Yaşamak
- 1992: Yedikuleli Mihriban
- 2001: Yeni Hayat
- 2002: Kardelen
- 2003: Gülüm
- 2003: Zalim
- 2004: Haziran Gecesi
- 2006: Candan Öte
- 2006: Dün Gece Bir Rüya Gördüm
- 2008: Aşk-ı Memnu
- 2011: Muhteşem Yüzyıl
- 2013: A.Ş.K.
- 2014: Kara Para Aşk
- 2015: Kanlı Ocak
- 2018: Yuvamdaki Düşman
- 2020: Menajerimi Ara
- 2025: Kuruluş Osman
- 2026: Tuzlu Kahve

Awards
Preceded by Ezel Olcay	Miss Turkey; 1960	Succeeded by Güler Samuray
