= The Beehive (1975 film) =

1975 film

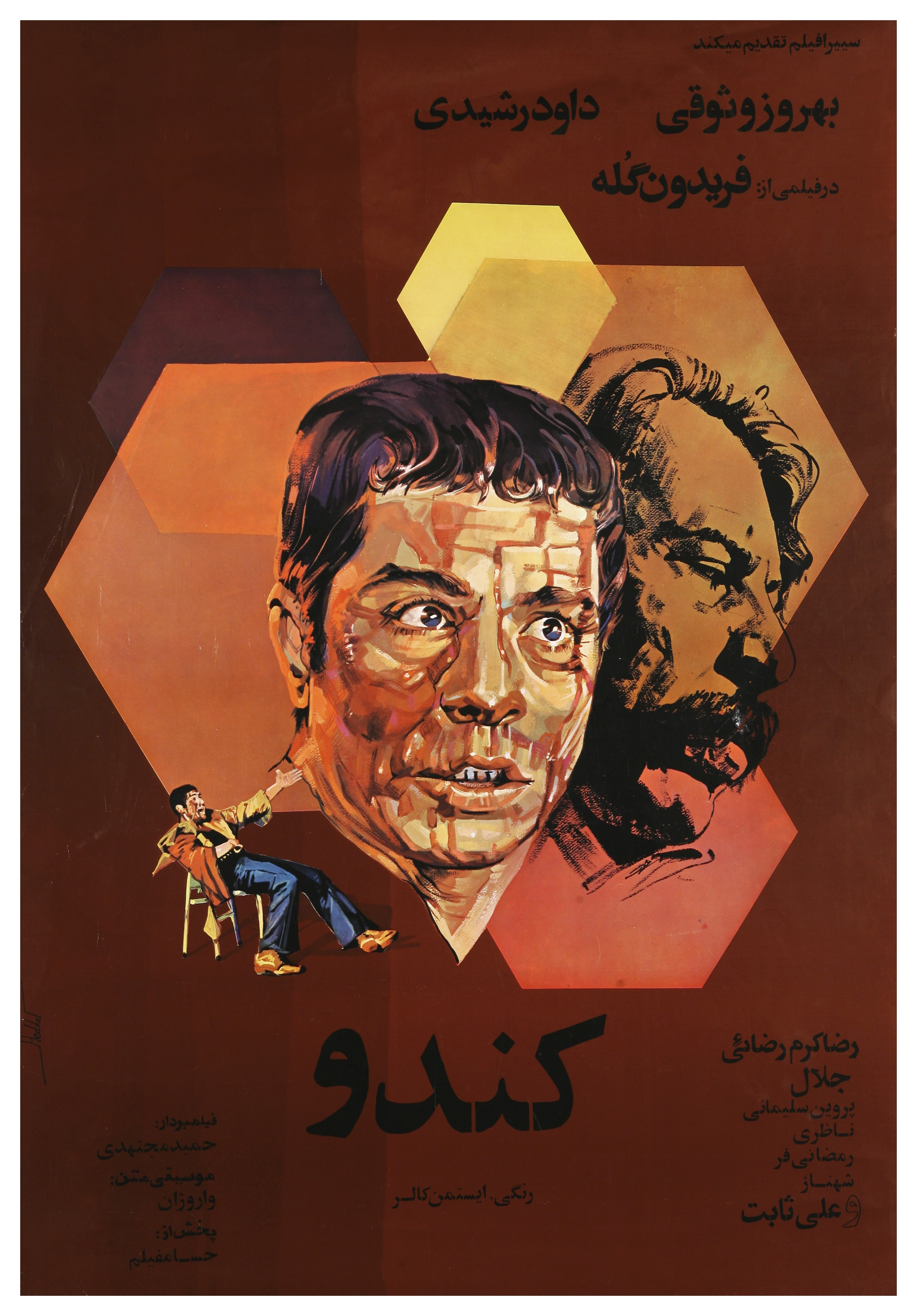
- Directed by: Fereydun Gole
- Written by: Fereydun Gole
- Produced by: Mehdi Mosayebi
- Starring: Behrouz Vossoughi; Davoud Rashidi; Reza Karam-Rezaei; Jalal Pishvaeian; Ali Sabetfar; Jalal Pishvaeian; Parvin Soleimani; Ezzatolah Ramezanifar
- Music by: Varoujan Hakhbandian
- Release date: 1975
- Running time: 112 minutes
- Country: Iran
- Language: Persian

The Beehive (Persian title: Kandoo; Persian: کندو) is a 1975 Iranian Persian-genre drama film directed by Fereydun Gole and starring Behrouz Vossoughi, Davoud Rashidi, Jalal Pishvaeian, and Reza Karam-Rezaei.

== Cast ==
- Behrouz Vossoughi as Ebi
- Davoud Rashidi as Agha Hosseini
- Abbass Nazeri Nick as Karim
