= Farhad Rachidi =

- Born: August 22, 1962 (age 64); Geneva, Switzerland
- Education: École Polytechnique Fédérale de Lausanne (M.S., PhD)
- Scientific career
- Fields: Electrical engineering, electromagnetics
- Workplaces: University of Florida; University of Toronto

Farhad Rachidi (born August 22, 1962, in Geneva, Switzerland) is an Iranian-Swiss scientist.

== Early life ==
Rachidi is the son of Davoud Rashidi, a famous Iranian theatre actor and director.

At the age of 3 months his family decided to move back to Iran. He attended Marika (Shahdokht Farahnaz) primary school and the French-Iranian Razi High-School in Tehran and obtained his high-school diploma in 1980. In the same year, he moved to Lausanne, Switzerland and started his education in electrical engineering. He received a M.S. degree in electrical engineering and a Ph.D. from the Swiss Federal Institute of Technology (EPFL), Lausanne, in 1986 and 1991 respectively.

== Career ==
Rachidi worked at the Power Systems Laboratory of the same institute until 1996 and had several short stays at the University of Florida and at the NASA Kennedy Space Center. In 1997, he joined the Lightning Research Laboratory of the University of Toronto in Canada and from April 1998 until September 1999, he was with Montena EMC in Switzerland. He is currently a Titular Professor and the head of the EMC Laboratory at the Swiss Federal Institute of Technology (EPFL), Lausanne. His research interests include lightning electromagnetics, electromagnetic compatibility, application of high power electromagnetics to humanitarian demining, and electromagnetic time reversal. In collaboration with Prof. C.A. Nucci of the University of Bologna, he has developed models for the evaluation of lightning electromagnetic radiation, which have been widely used in lightning-related engineering applications. One of the most important contributions made by Professor Rachidi is the development of a model describing the interaction of an exciting electromagnetic field and a transmission line.

Dr. Rachidi served as the vice-chair of the European COST Action on the Physics of Lightning Flash and its Effects (2005-2009), the Chairman of the 2008 European Electromagnetics International Symposium (EUROEM), the President of the International Conference on Lightning Protection (2008-2014), and the Editor-in-Chief of the IEEE Transactions on Electromagnetic Compatibility (2013-2015). He is currently the President of the Swiss National Committee of the International Union of Radio Science (URSI) and a Distinguished Lecturer of the IEEE Electromagnetic Compatibility Society. Prof. Rachidi is an IEEE Fellow, EMP Fellow and Electromagnetics Academy Fellow.

== Rachidi Model ==
This model, known as the Rachidi model, is extensively used in the literature for the evaluation of field-induced disturbances in transmission lines. Another remarkable endeavor of Prof. Rachidi is the instrumentation of the Säntis Tower in Switzerland for lightning current measurements. This project was initiated by Prof. Rachidi, Prof. M. Rubinstein and Prof. M. Paolone and resulted in the instrumentation of the tower for lightning current measurements. Since its instrumentation in 2010, several hundreds of lightning flashes have been successfully recorded on the tower and the station has served as a primary experimental site used by researchers and engineers involved in lightning research and protection. The obtained data constitute the largest dataset on lightning current and current derivatives associated with upward flashes available to this date. Other activities of Prof. Rachidi include the development of the so-called ‘full-wave’ transmission line models (in cooperation with Dr. Sergei Tkachenko) and the use of the Electromagnetic Time Reversal (EMTR) technique to locating lightning discharges and faults in power networks (in cooperation of Prof. Marcos Rubinstein and Prof. Mario Paolone).

== Publications ==
Farhad Rachidi is the author or coauthor of around 150 scientific papers published in peer-reviewed journals, over 350 papers presented at international conferences, 3 books and more than 10 book chapters. One of his books (Electromagnetic Field Interaction with Transmission Lines. From Classical Theory to HF Radiation Effects) has been translated into Chinese and published by Tsinghua University Press.

== Awards ==
In recognition of his outstanding research activities in the field of lightning. electromagnetics and EMC, he has received numerous awards, including the IEEE EMC Society Technical Achievement Award (2005), the CIGRE Technical Committee Award (2005), and the Blondel Medal from the French Association of Electrical Engineering, Electronics, Information Technology and Communication (2006). In 2014, Farhad Rachidi was conferred the title of Honorary Professor of the Xi’an Jiaotong University in China.

In October 2016 Farhad Rachidi-Haeri has received the prestigious Karl Berger Award for extraordinary theoretical and experimental achievements in lightning research. The Karl Berger Award is the highest distinction given by the International Conference on Lightning Protection (ICLP). It is given to scientisits for distinguished achievements in the science and engineering of lightning research, developing new fields in theory and practice, modelling and measurements. The conference was established in 1951 by a group of eminent scientists and is now considered to be the most prestigious scientific conference in the field of physics of lightning discharges and lightning protection.
