= The Dagger (1972 film) =

Dagger
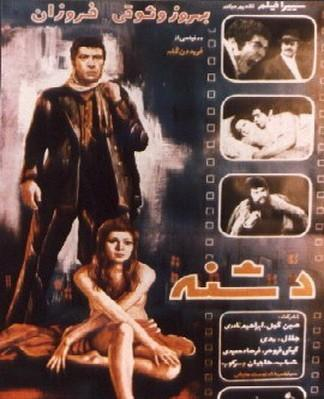
- Directed by: Fereydun Gole
- Written by: Fereydun Gole
- Starring: Behrouz Vossoughi; Forouzan; Jalal Pishvaeian; Hossein Shahab
- Music by: Varoujan Hakhbandian
- Release date: 1972
- Running time: 105 minutes
- Country: Iran
- Language: Persian

Dagger (Persian title: Deshneh – Persian: دشنه) is a 1972 Iranian drama romance film directed by Fereydun Gole and starring Behrouz Vossoughi, Forouzan, Jalal Pishvaeian and Hossein Gil.

== Cast ==
- Behrouz Vossoughi – Abbas
- Hossein Gil – Mohammad
- Forouzan -
- Jalal Pishvaeian
- Hossein Shahab
