= Khodahafez Tehran =

1966 Iranian film by Samuel Khachikian

- Directed by: Samuel Khachikian
- Written by: Samuel Khachikian
- Starring: Behrouz Vossoughi; Pouri Banayi; Jalal Pishavian; Mariya Magforiyan; Iran Daftari
- Music by: Anoushiravan Rohani
- Release date: 1966
- Running time: 90 minutes
- Country: Iran
- Language: Persian

Khodahafez Tehran (Persian: خداحافظ تهران) is a 1966 Iranian dramatic-romance film directed by Samuel Khachikian and produced by Moulin Rouge Studios. It stars Behrouz Vossoughi, Pouri Banayi, and Jalal Pishavian.
