= Ibn al-Sheikh =

Ibn al-Sheikh (Persian: ابن‌الشیخ), or Sheikh Mohammad Haeri Mazandarani, was an important spiritual figure in the Persian Constitutional Revolution. He served on the Supreme Court.

== Early life ==
Ibn al-Sheikh was the third child of Zine al Abidine Haeri Mazandarani. He was born in Karbala and educated by his father. After his father's death, he became a disciple of Mirza Habibollah Rashti in Najaf. After the death of Mirza Habibollah Rashti, he went to India to gather disciples and stayed there for fourteen years. While living in India, he was surrounded by people of different backgrounds, who introduced him to anti-imperialism and helped to set him on his revolutionary path.

== Constitutional revolution ==
He returned to Iran shortly before the start of the Constitutional Revolution and collaborated with the Constitutionalists. After the bombing of Parliament (23 June 1908), he went to Najaf and organized actions by its leaders, including Mohammad-Kazem Khorasani and Sheikh Abdullah Mazandarani, to support and defend the Constitution. He experienced conflict and oppression upon his arrival in Iran with Mass'oud Mirza Zell-e Soltan. After he strongly protested he was beaten and forced to apologize.

== Supreme Court ==
After the fall of Mohammad Ali Shah Qajar and the reopening of the National Consultative Majlis by the Supreme Court, he was appointed by the national government and given approval by the authorities to practice in Najaf. After a conflict with Doctor Francis Adolf Gamer, known as Monsieur Parni, Ibn al-Sheikh resigned from the Supreme Court and later went to Qom.

== Death ==
After Ibn al-Sheikh retired he relocated to Qom in 1960, where he died of a stroke ten years later.

== Survivors ==
His son Abdul Amir Rashidi Haeri served as Iran's ambassador to Afghanistan and Tunisia. His grandson was the actor Davoud Rashidi.
