= Aki Banayi =

Iranian singer (1951–2025)

Akram Banaei (Persian: اکرم بنایی; May 4, 1951 – November 2, 2025), better known as Aki Banayi (Persian: اکی بنایی) was an Iranian-American singer.

== Life and career ==
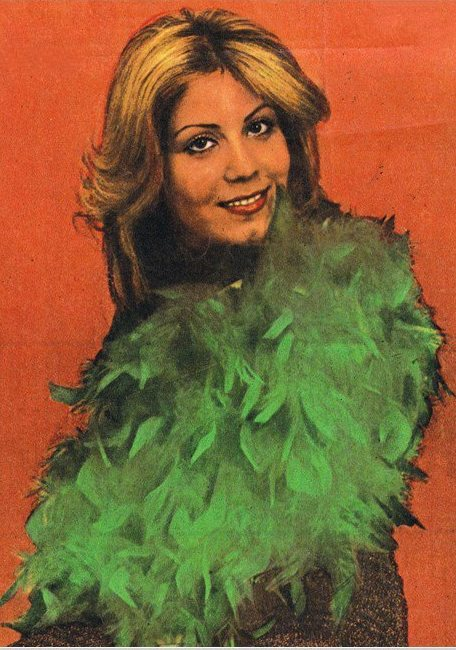
Aki Banayi

Banaei was born in Arak, Iran on May 4, 1951, a sister of actress Pouri Banayi. Following the Iranian Revolution in 1979, she emigrated to Los Angeles. She earned a Ph.D. from the Conservatory of Music at the University of California.

She released an album, Your Look, in 2004. Throughout her career, she recorded a number of folk songs, working alongside among others Homa Mirafshar, and Mohammad Heidari.

Banayi died in Los Angeles on November 2, 2025, at the age of 74.
