= Sooteh-Delan =

- Film poster
- Directed by: Ali Hatami
- Screenplay by: Ali Hatami
- Produced by: Ali Abbasi
- Starring: Behrouz Vossoughi; Shohreh Aghdashloo; Jamshid Mashayekhi; Fakhri Khorvash
- Cinematography: Houshang Baharlou
- Edited by: Musa Afshar
- Production company: Payam Cinematic Organization
- Release date: 24 November 1977 (Iran)
- Running time: 120 minutes
- Country: Iran
- Language: Persian

Sooteh-Delan or Sute-Delān (Persian: سوته‌دلان, lit. 'Broken-hearted people'), also known as Desiderium, is a 1977 Iranian film directed and written by Ali Hatami, produced by Ali Abbasi and starring Behrouz Vosoughi. The film is the story of an old family in Tehran, in which Jamshid Mashayekhi (Habib), as the elder brother of the family, is the head of the family, and Behrouz Vosoughi (Majid), the younger brother, has mental problems. The family lives. Majid is taken care of by his older brother.
