= Ghazal (1975 film) =

- The theatrical poster by Morteza Momayez
- Directed by: Masoud Kimiai
- Written by: Jorge Luis Borges
- Screenplay by: Masoud Kimiai
- Based on: The Interloper by Jorge Luis Borges
- Produced by: Parviz Sayyad
- Starring: Mohammad Ali Fardin; Faramarz Gharibian; Pouri Banayi
- Cinematography: Nemat Haghighi
- Edited by: Abbas Ganjavi
- Music by: Esfandiar Monfaredzadeh
- Release date: 1975
- Running time: 106 minutes
- Country: Iran
- Language: Persian

Ghazal (Persian: غزل) is a 1975 Iranian film directed by Masoud Kimiai. It stars Mohammad Ali Fardin, Faramarz Gharibian and Pouri Banayi. It is based on the short story "The Interloper", written by Jorge Luis Borges. Since Fardin had been typecast as a happy-go-lucky person who always appeared in movies with happy endings, this film was a departure for him and was not successful at the box office.

== Plot ==
Hojjat and Zeinolabedin are two brothers who make a living by forestry. They have a steady life until Hojjat brings a prostitute from the city to the jungles. She keeps the house and washes and does the house chores and also has sex with each of the brothers. The two brothers fall in love with her and can not put up with the situation. They kill the girl, set fire to their house and leave the jungle.

== Cast ==
- Mohammad Ali Fardin as Hojjat
- Faramarz Gharibian as Zeinolabedin
- Pouri Banayi as Ghazal
- Amrollah Saberi as Nosrat
- Saeed Pirdust as the man at the bar
- Parvin Soleimani
- Shahnaz
- Anita
