= The Invincible Six =

1970 American-Iranian film by Jean Negulesco

- Directed by: Jean Negulesco
- Written by: Michael Barrett (novel); Guy Elmes; Chester Erskine
- Produced by: Mostafa Akavan; Morteza Akhavan
- Starring: Stuart Whitman; Elke Sommer; Curd Jürgens; James Mitchum
- Cinematography: Piero Portalupi
- Music by: Manos Hatzidakis
- Production company: Moulin Rouge Productions
- Distributed by: Paramount British Pictures (UK); Continental Distributing (US)
- Release date: 10 June 1970
- Running time: 103 minutes
- Countries: Iran; United States
- Languages: English; Persian

The Invincible Six (also known as The Heroes and Qahremanan) is a 1970 American-Iranian adventure film directed by Jean Negulesco and starring Stuart Whitman, Elke Sommer, James Mitchum, Curd Jürgens, and Ian Ogilvy. Six international criminals attempt to steal the crown jewels of Iran, but in the tradition of 1954 film Seven Samurai and the 1960 film The Magnificent Seven, end up defending a village from bandits. In Britain and several other countries it was picked up for distribution by Paramount Pictures.

== Plot ==
An adventurous American whom everybody calls Tex, and his partners, the mechanically savvy Mike and an Englishman named Ronald, are foiled in their bid to steal Tehran's precious jewels. They become fugitives in the Iranian desert, and eventually join up with three other criminals, an Iranian, an Italian, and a German, to plot another heist.

They meet Zari, the beautiful mistress of the infamous bandit Malik, who is after a valuable amulet. Nazar, the marauder who besieged the village that the protagonists took refuge in, was after this same amulet. This leads to an intense and violent conflict. In the end, Ronald is captured and tortured, Nazar is shot, and Zari is soon forced to decide if she wishes to continue on to wherever fate takes Tex next.

== Cast ==
- Stuart Whitman as Tex
- Elke Sommer as Zari
- Curd Jürgens as Baron Karl von Bitterhofen
- James Mitchum as Nazar
- Ian Ogilvy as Ronald
- Behrouz Vossoughi as Jahan
- Lon Satton as Mike
- Isarco Ravaioli as Giorgio
- Pouri Banayi as Jahan's wife

== See also ==
- List of American films of 1970
