= The Nameless Knight =

- Theatrical film poster
- Directed by: Hassan Sassanpour, Halit Refiğ
- Written by: Hassan Sassanpour
- Produced by: Hürrem Erman, Mehdi Missaghieh
- Starring: Cüneyt Arkın, Nebahat Çehre, Pouri Banayi
- Cinematography: Ilhan Arakon
- Production companies: Erman Film, Misaghiye Studio
- Release date: 1970
- Running time: 83 minutes
- Countries: Iran, Turkey
- Languages: Persian; Turkish

The Nameless Knight (Persian: فرزند شمشیر, Turkish: Adsız Cengaver ve Sultan Gelin) is a 1970 Turkish-Iranian co-production historical fantasy film directed by Halit Refiğ and Hassan Sasanpour starring Cüneyt Arkın, Nebahat Çehre, Pouri Banayi, Birsen Ayda, and Altan Günbay. Turkish actors also played at this movie.

== Plot ==
A young hero, popularly known as "The Nameless Knight", struggles against the tyrannical ruler of Bukhara. The ruler learns that he will be given divine punishment for his wicked deeds and will be killed by his own son. He orders a female to drown his baby son in the river soon after birth but he is left in a basket to float and survives. When the son grows up, he is compelled to kill his father.

== Cast ==
- Cüneyt Arkın as Adsiz
- Nebahat Çehre as Altinay
- Pouri Banayi as Gülnaz (credited as Puri Banai)
- Birsen Ayda as Ebrise
- Altan Günbay as Cabbar
- Humayun Tebrizyan as Köse
- Milton Reid as Dev
