= Vagabond (1950 film) =

- Directed by: Mehdi Reisfirooz
- Written by: Mehdi Reisfirooz
- Cinematography: Mohsen Badi
- Production company: Iran Film
- Release date: 18 December 1950
- Running time: 100 minutes
- Country: Iran
- Language: Persian

Vagabond (Persian: ولگرد, romanized: Velgard) is a 1950 Iranian film directed by Mehdi Reisfirooz.

== Cast ==
- Mehr-Aghdas Khajenuri
- Naser Malek Motiee
- Soosan
- Cahit Irgat as Muhsen Agha
- Danyal Topatan as Danial Agha
- Hulusi Kentmen as Ahmad Khan

== Bibliography ==
- Mohammad Ali Issari. Cinema in Iran, 1900-1979. Scarecrow Press, 1989.
