= Jalal Moghadam =

Iranian film director and actor (1929-1996)

- جلال مقدم
- Born: 30 April 1929; Nishapur, Imperial State of Iran
- Died: 18 April 1996 (aged 66); Tehran, Iran
- Occupations: Film director, screenwriter, film critic, actor
- Years active: 1958–1995

Jalal Moghadam (Persian: جلال مقدم; 30 April 1929 – 18 April 1996) was an Iranian film director, screenwriter, film critic, and actor.

== Life ==
He began collaborating with the Cinema Press by writing a critique of a Canadian film and writing in magazines such as "Peyk Cinema" and "Atashbar". He wrote his first screenplay, South of the City, directed by Farrokh Ghaffari. During his career, he made films like The Window, Fleeing the Trap, 3 Crazies, and Samad and Foolad Zereh, the Ogre.

== Death ==
Jalal Moghadam, who suffered from Alzheimer's, was taken to hospital in March 2009 in a car accident and died on April 5.

== Filmography ==
=== Feature films ===
Year	Title	Actor	Director	Writer	Notes
1958	South of the City			Yes	
1964	Dedicated Mother	Yes			
1965	Night of the Hunchback			Yes	
1966	Brick and Mirror	Yes			
1966	The House of God		Yes	Yes	Documentary
1968	3 Crazies		Yes	Yes	
1970	The Window		Yes	Yes	
1971	Fleeing the Trap		Yes	Yes	
1972	The Secret of the Oleaster Tree		Yes		
1972	Samad and Foolad Zereh, the Ogre	Yes	Yes	Yes	
1987	Love Nest		Yes		
1987	The Suitcase		Yes		
1988	Hey Joe!	Yes			
1989	The Lead	Yes			
1989	Hamoun	Yes			
1990	Snake Fang	Yes			
1990	Galan	Yes			
1991	The Shadow of Imagination	Yes			
1991	The Snake	Yes			
1992	Love-stricken	Yes			
1992	The Lady	Yes			
1993	The Wolf's Trail	Yes			
1993	Zero Heights	Yes			
1994	The Stuntman	Yes			
1995	I Want to Be Alive	Yes			
1995	Cow Horn	Yes			

=== Television ===
Year	Title	Note
1977	Changak	In the directing group
1991	This Home Is Far Away	As actor
1994	Wives	Guest actor
1994	The Hidden Half of the Moon	As actor
