= Nosratollah Vahdat =

Iranian comedian (1925–2020)

- نصرت‌الله وحدت
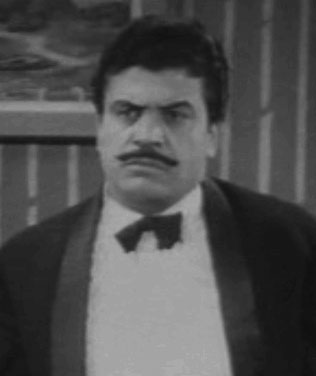
- Vahdat in The Foreign Bride (1964)
- Born: 7 September 1925; Isfahan, Iran
- Died: 6 October 2020 (aged 95); Tehran, Iran
- Occupations: Actor; film director; comedian
- Years active: 1950–1979
- Spouse: Forough Rajai
- Children: 5

Nosratollah Vahdat (Persian: نصرت‌الله وحدت; 7 September 1925 – 6 October 2020) was an Iranian comedian, actor, and film director. He is best known in Iran for his Esfahani accent.

== Biography ==
Nosratollah Vahdat was born on 7 September 1925 in Isfahan, Pahlavi Iran. He was a pioneer of the Isfahan Theater.

In 1964, he won the Golden Dolphin award for his film The Bride at the Asian Film Festival. However, after the Iranian Revolution in 1979 he stopped acting for a period. Contemporary actors of his include Parviz Sayyad, Reza Arham Sadr, and Behrouz Vossoughi.

== Filmography ==
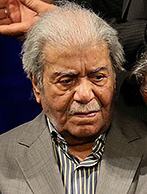
Vahdat in May 2018

- 1976 – Naghs-e Fanni (Persian: نقص فنی)
- 1977 – Unaware Days (Persian: روزهای بی‌خبری, romanized: Roozha-ye bikhabari)
- 1977 – Mr. Etemad's Trouble (Persian: مشکل آقای اعتماد, romanized: Moshkel-e agha-ye Etemad), as actor
- 1976 – An Isfahani in Hitler's Land (Persian: یک اصفهانی در سرزمین هیتلر, romanized: Yek Esfahani dar sarzamin-e Hitler), as director and actor
- 1976 – My Husband Has Fallen in Love (Persian: شوهر جونم عاشق شده, romanized: Shohar joonam ashegh shode), as director and actor
- 1974 – A Husband to Rent (Persian: شوهر کرایه‌ای, romanized: Shohar-e Kerayei)
- 1974 – Escaping the Paradise (Persian: فرار از بهشت, romanized: Farar az Behesht)
- 1973 – Who Put a Bouquet of Flowers in the Water?
- 1972 – An Isfahani in New York (Persian: یک اصفهانی در نیویورک, romanized: Yek Esfahani dar New York)
- 1965 – Poor Thing!
- 1964 – The Bride (Persian: عروس فرنگی, romanized: Arouse Farangi)
- 1963 – A Passenger from Heaven
- 1961 – The Roasted Duck
- 1960 – The Nobody
- 1960 – The Doll Behind the Window
- 1960 – Safarali
- 1959 – Luck and Love and Coincidence
- 1958 – A Ray of Hope (Persian: روزنه امید, romanized: Rowzanehe Omid)
- 1957 – Ladder of Progress (Persian: نردبان ترقی, romanized: Nardebane Taraghi)
- 1956 – The Sun Shines
- 1956 – The Fifth Marriage
