= Varoujan Hakhbandian =

Iranian composer (1936–1977)

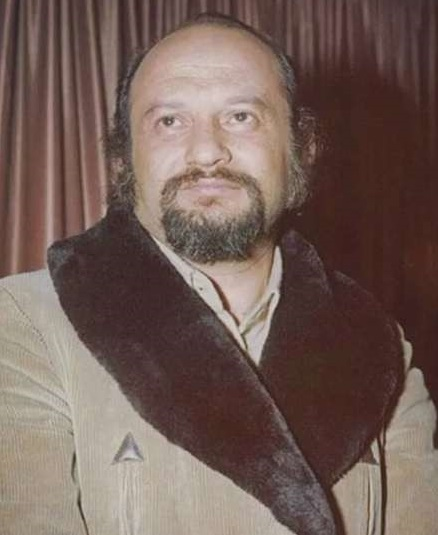

Background information
- Born: Varoujan Hakhbandian; 4 December 1936; Qazvin, Iran
- Origin: Iranian
- Died: 17 September 1977 (aged 40) Tehran, Iran
- Genre: Pop Music
- Occupation: Composer
- Labels: Caltex Records, Taraneh Records, Avang Music

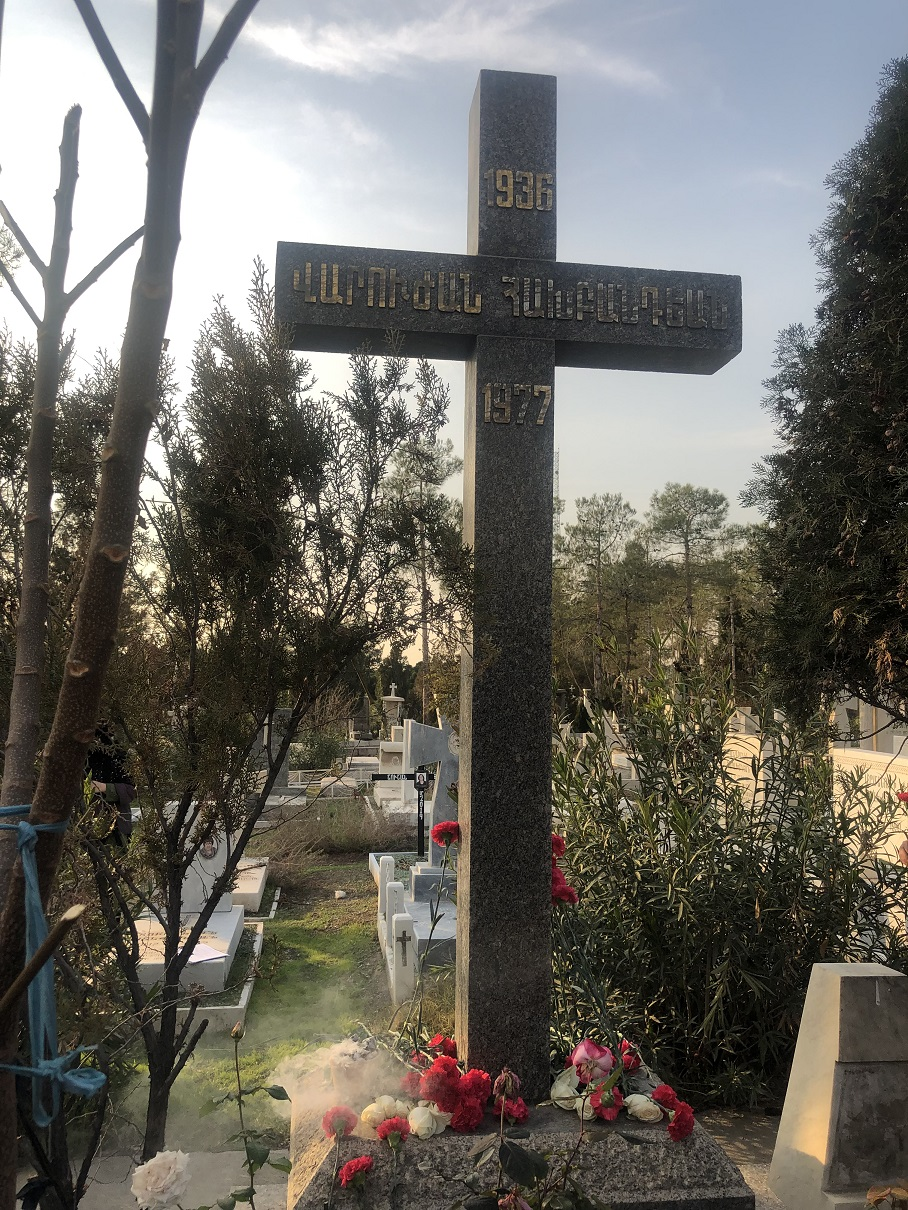
Varoujan Hakhbandian grave at Burastan Cemetery

Varoujan Hakhbandian (Persian: واروژان هاخباندیان, Armenian: Վարուժան Հախբանդյան), mostly known as Varoujan (Qazvin, 4 December 1936 – Tehran, 17 September 1977) was an Iranian composer, songwriter and arranger of Armenian descent.

He has composed and written songs for Ebi, Googoosh, Dariush, and Farhad Mehrad.

The music for the movie "Bar Faraaze Aasemaanha" (High in the Skies), composed shortly before his death, is one of his famous works.

Varoujan Hakhbandian made songs for some films. As an example The Dagger and The Beehive.

== Filmography ==
- Beehive (1975)
