= Fleeing the Trap =

1971 Iranian action romance film

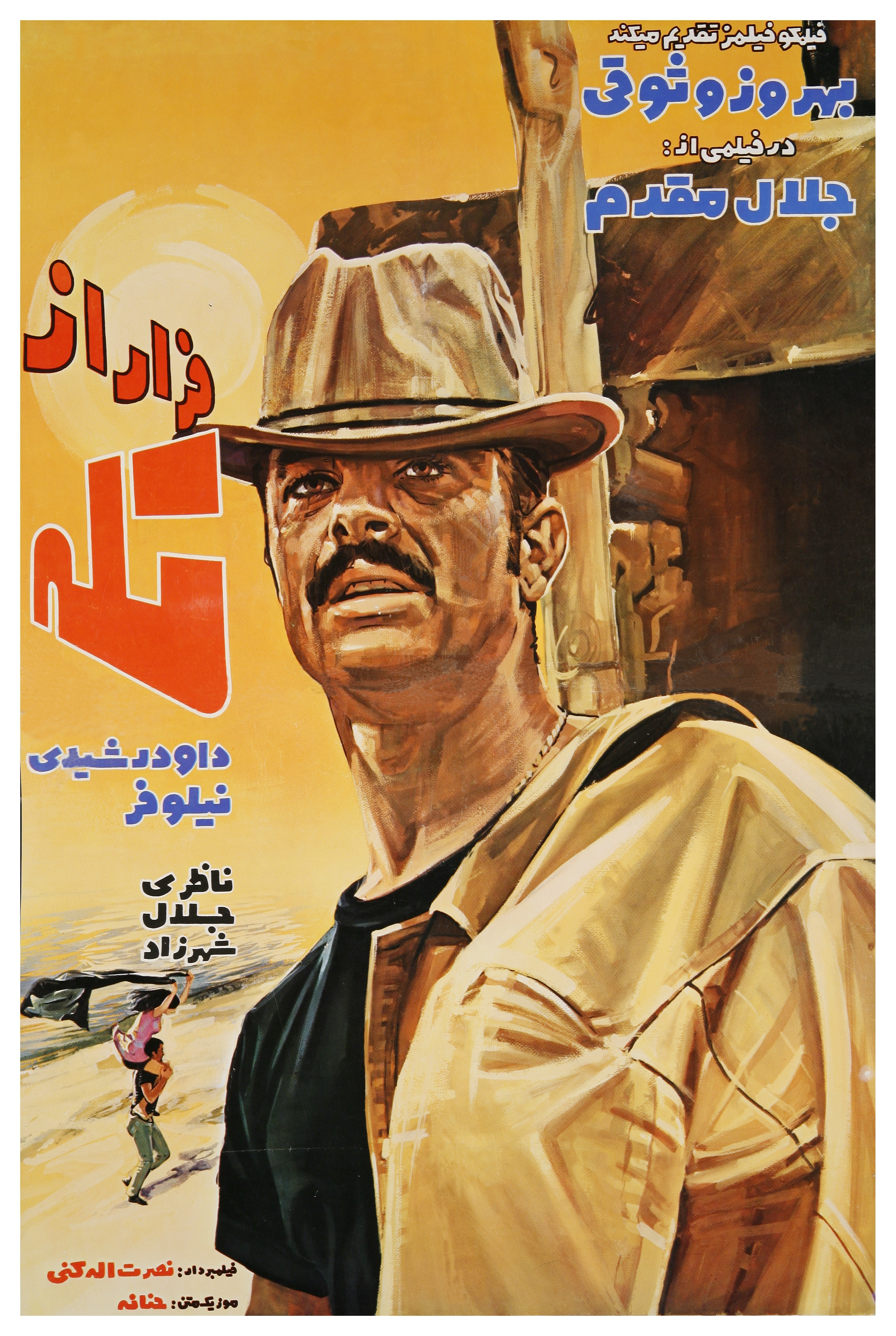
- Directed by: Jalal Moghadam
- Written by: Jalal Moghadam
- Starring: Behrouz Vossoughi; Davoud Rashidi; Shahin Khalili (Niloofar); Shamsi Fazlolahi; Abbass Nazeri; Jalal Pishvaeian
- Music by: Morteza Hannaneh
- Release date: 1971
- Running time: 110 minutes
- Country: Iran
- Language: Persian

Fleeing the Trap (Persian: فرار از تله, Farar az Taleh) [aka The Getaway or Escape From the Trap] is a 1971 Iranian action romance film directed by Jalal Moghadam and starring Behrouz Vossoughi, Davoud Rashidi, Jalal Pishvaeian and Shahin Khalili (Niloofar).

== Plot summary ==
Morteza is a young man who is released from prison after serving five years. He returns to find that Mehri, the woman he loves, has been forced to marry a man named Faraj, who agrees to release her only in exchange for money. As Morteza tries to change his situation, he becomes involved with Karim, and the two decide to commit a robbery.

== Cast ==
- Behrouz Vossoughi
- Davoud Rashidi
- Shamsi Fazlolahi

== Reception ==
At a retrospective screening by the Iranian Critics Association, filmmaker Kianoush Ayari discussed the film’s place in Iranian cinema. He noted that Fleeing the Trap stood out during the dominance of filmfarsi productions, combining a realistic opening with action and police elements in its second half. Ayari praised the opening, the ending, and the use of Dezful locations, while describing some scenes and dialogue as unnecessary. He added that although he did not consciously draw from Jalal Moghadam’s work, films like Fleeing the Trap may have influenced later directors. The score by Morteza Hannaneh was also highlighted and had received a Sepas Film Festival award.
