= The Window (1970 film) =

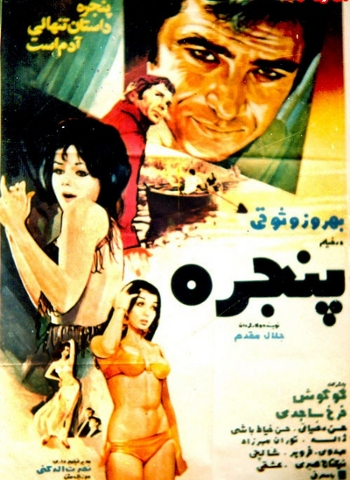
- Directed by: Jalal Moghadam
- Written by: Jalal Moghadam
- Based on: An American Tragedy; 1925 novel by Theodore Dreiser
- Produced by: Ali Abbasi
- Starring: Behrouz Vossoughi; Googoosh; Farrokh Sajedi; Hassan Rezyani; Zhaleh Olov
- Cinematography: Nosratollah Kani
- Edited by: Mehdi Rajaian
- Music by: Esfandiar Monfaredzadeh
- Release date: 1970
- Running time: 109 minutes
- Country: Iran
- Language: Persian

The Window (Persian: پنجره, Panjereh) is a 1970 Iranian Persian-genre drama Romantic film directed by Jalal Moghadam, and starring Behrouz Vossoughi, Googoosh, and Zhaleh Olov.

== Plot summary ==
Sohrab Salari (Behrouz Vosoughi) goes from Abadan to Tehran for work and becomes employed at his uncle's factory, Mostafa Salari (Mohsen Mahdavi). Sohrab meets a girl named Taraneh (Nouri Kessravi). Taraneh is pregnant. Taraneh's guardian, Asghar Zhila (Hasan Razianni), plots to pass Sohrab off as the father of the child so that the expenses of Taraneh's delivery fall on Sohrab. Sohrab develops feelings for his uncle's family friend’s daughter (Googoosh), but Taraneh is an obstacle for them. Sohrab and Taraneh argue in a boat, causing it to capsize, and Taraneh drowns in the water. The police arrest Sohrab as the murderer, but eventually, Sohrab is released; however, after his release, everyone distances themselves from him.

== Cast ==
- Behrouz Vossoughi as Sohrab Salari
- Googoosh as Leili (as Faegheh Atashin)
- Farrokh Sajedi as Jamshid
- Hassan Raziani as Asghar Zhila
- Mohsen Mahdavi as Sohrab's uncle (Mostafa Salari)
- Hasan Khayat-Bashi as Police officer
