= Tangsir (film) =

1974 film by Amir Naderi

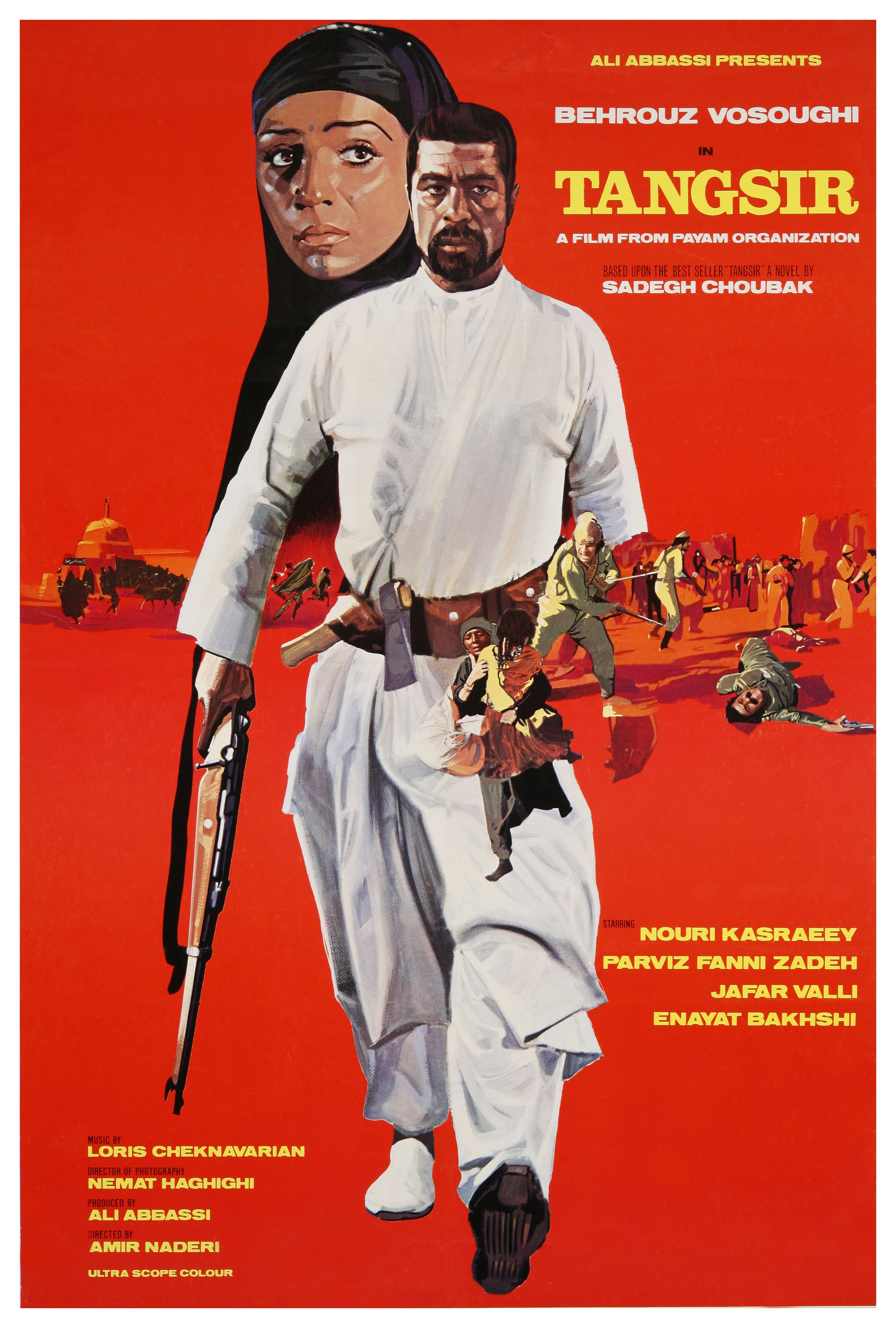
- Directed by: Amir Naderi
- Based on: a novel written by Sadeq Chubak
- Starring: Behruz Vossoughi
- Release date: 1973
- Country: Iran
- Language: Persian

Tangsir is a film directed by Amir Naderi. Behrouz Vossoughi is the leading actor playing the role of Zar Mohammad (or Shir Mohammad). This film was based on a novel written by Sadeq Chubak. Tangsir is set in the southwestern Iranian coastal province of Bushehr around 1935.

== Cast ==
- Behrouz Vossoughi as Zar Mohammend (the Tangsir)
- Nouri Kasrai as Shahro
- Parviz Fannizadeh as Ismail
- Enayat Bakhshi as Nayeb
- Mehri Vedadian as Sakineh

== Reception ==
Hengameh nahid said of the film, "a memorable and acceptable film that has no expiration date." Naderi's film evokes emotive feelings about justice, honor, patriotism, and revenge
