= Tangsir (novel) =

1963 novel by Sadeq Chubak

Tangsir تنگسیر
- Author: Sadeq Chubak
- Original title: تنگسیر; Tangsir
- Language: Persian
- Genre: Fiction
- Publisher: Negah Publications
- Publication date: 1963
- Publication place: Iran
- Media type: Print
- Pages: 232
- ISBN: 964-351-162-6

Tangsir (also transliterated as Tangseer, in Persian: تنگسیر) is a Persian novel written by Iranian writer Sadeq Chubak. Tangsir was the author's first novel. The book recounts the valorous acts of the fighters of Tangestan (a region near Bushehr province).

== Background ==
Chubak was a translator of western novels and stories into Persian. Before writing Tangsir. The author translated books including Pinocchio and some of Eugene O'Neill's plays. Tangsir's events have really occurred in Bushehr in the past. Rasoul Parvizi, an Iranian writer wrote a short story in his 1957 short story collection, The Patched Pants (in Persian: شلوارهای وصله‌دار) named Shir Mohammad (the name of the hero of the Tangsir novel) and Chubak had been influenced by that story.
