= Sirus Alvand =

Iranian director and screenwriter (born 1951)

سیروس الوند Sirus Alvand
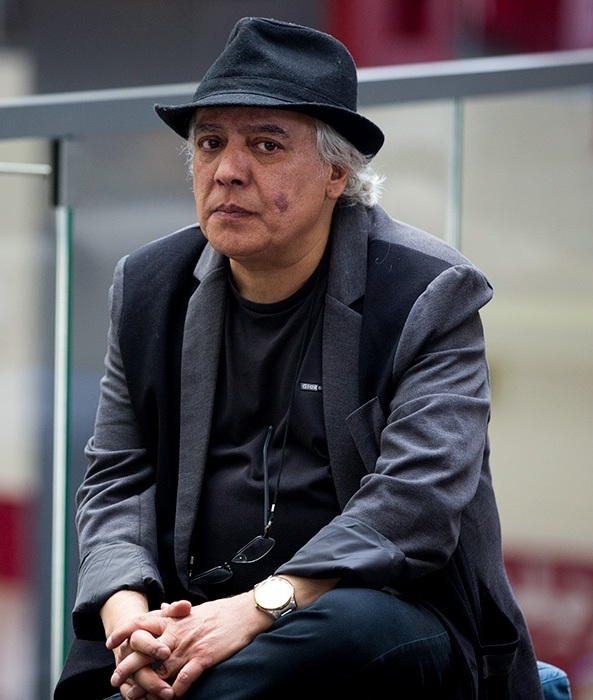
- Alvand in 2017
- Born: January 31, 1951 (age 74); Tehran, Iran
- Occupation(s): Film director, Screenwriter
- Years active: 1971–present
- Spouse: Nahid Abbasi(m. 1972)
- Children: 2

Sirus Alvand (Persian: سیروس الوند; born January 31, 1951), also spelled Cyrous Alvand, is an Iranian director and screenwriter who was born in 1951 in Tehran, Iran. He began his career as film critic and screenwriter and directed his debut film Sanjar in 1971. He is among filmmakers of pre-Revolution era who are still working. Some of his films were among box office hits.

In 1993, he won a Crystal Simorgh for best director in the 11th Fajr International Film Festival.

== Films ==
- Outcry under the Water, 1977
- Stemming from Blood, 1983
- Cargo, 1987
- Once and for All, 1992
- The Face, 1995
- The Corrupted Hands, 1999
- The Intruder, 2001
- Porteghal Khoni, 2010
