= Mehdi Reisfirooz =

Iranian film director, actor and film producer (1927–2019)

- مهدی رئیس فیروز
- Born: 1927 (age 98–99); Tehran, Iran

Mehdi Reisfirooz (Persian: مهدی رئیس فیروز, 1927 – 15 March 2019) was an Iranian film director, actor and film producer. He was born in Tehran in 1927, and died in Canada on 15 March 2019.

== Filmography ==
- 1968: Gerdabe gonah
- 1968: Yosef-va-Zolikha / Yusuf İle Züleyha
- 1961: A Flower in the Salt Land
- 1961: The Black Pearl
- 1960: I'm Dying to Get Money
- 1960: The Promise
- 1959: The Wild Angel
- 1957: The Rough Adventurers
- 1956: Joseph and Potiphar's Wife
- 1955: The End of Sufferings
- 1953: The Stumble
- 1950: Vagabond
