= Fereydun Gole =

Iranian screenwriter and film director

Fereydun Goleh
- فریدون گُله
- Born: 7 September 1940; Tehran, Iran
- Died: 22 October 2005 (aged 65)
- Occupations: Screenwriter, film director, film editor
- Years active: 1968–1976

Fereydun Gole (Persian: فریدون گُله; also spelled Fereydoun Goleh) (7 September 1940 – 22 October 2005) was an Iranian screenwriter, film director, and film editor. He was active in producing urban drama films throughout the 1970s, dealing with such issues as the social stratification of Tehran. His most famous film was Beehive. After he died in 2005, the 2006 documentary film Iran: A Cinematographic Revolution was dedicated to him.

== Filmography ==
- The Night of the Angels (1968)
- Blue World (1969)
- Vahshi-e jangal (1971)
- Impious (1972)
- The Dagger (1972)
- Mashti Mamdali's Car (1974) - Writer
- Under the Skin of the Night (1974)
- The Mandrake (1975)
- Beehive (1975)
- Honeymoon (1976)
