= Mehrab Ghasemkhani =

- مهراب قاسم‌خانی
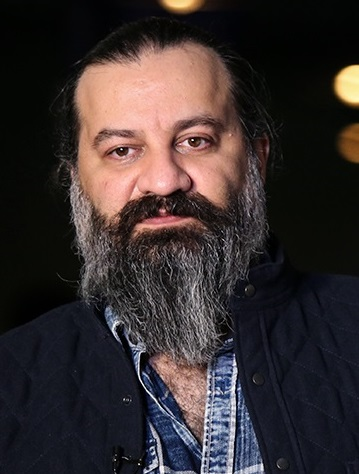
- Ghasemkhani in 2019
- Born: 7 December 1971 (age 54); Tehran, Iran
- Occupations: screenwriter; painter; set designer; actor
- Years active: 1997–present
- Spouses: Maryam Golrou (divorced) Shaghayegh Dehghan (m. 2002; div. 2018)
- Children: 2
- Relatives: Peyman Ghasemkhani (brother)

Mehrab Ghasemkhani (Persian: مهراب قاسم‌خانی, born December 7, 1971) is an Iranian screenwriter, painter, set designer and actor.

== Personal life ==
Ghasemkhani's brother is Peyman Ghasemkhani, also a painter, screenwriter, set designer and actor. Mehrab Ghasemkhani earned both his Bachelors of Arts (BA) and Masters in Fine Arts (MFA) in painting from Islamic Azad University in Tehran.

He started his work as a set designer, costume designer and scriptwriter in 1996. He has been involved in writing screenplays and acting since then. He married Shaghayegh Dehghan in 2002. The couple separated in 2018. He has two children, Nirvana and Noyan Ghasemkhani, from his former marriages.

== Selected filmography ==
| Year | Film/series | Director | role |
|---|---|---|---|
| 2021 | "Khub, Bad, Jelf#3; Radio active" | Peyman Ghasemkhani and Mohsen Chegini | Screenwriter |
| 2020 | "Jooje Tighi" | Mastaneh Mohajer | Actor |
| 2019 | "Jahan ba Man Beraghs" | Soroush Sehhat | Actor |
| 2019 | "Nagahan Derakht" | Safi Yazdanian | Actor |
| 2018 | "Khub, Bad, Jelf" | Peyman Ghasemkhani | Actor |
| 2018 | "Dorehami--15 episodes" | Mehrab Ghasemkhani | Screenwriter |
| 2016 | "Shamdouni" | Soroush Sehhat | Set designer |
| 2014 | "Pejman" | Soroush Sehhat | Screenwriter |
| 2011 | "Dozdo Police" | Saeed Aghakhani | Screenwriter |
| 2009 | Sakhteman Pezeshkan | Soroush Sehhat | Screenwriter and set designer |
| 2009 | Mosaferan | Rambod Javan | Screenwriter |
| 2009 | St. Petersburg | Behrooz Afkhami | Screenwriter |
| 2008 | Marde Hezar Chehreh | Mehran Modiri | Screenwriter |
| 2007 | Ganje Mozaffar | Mehran Modiri | Screenwriter |
| 2006 | Baghe Mozaffar | Mehran Modiri | Screenwriter |
| 2005-2006 | Shabhaye Barareh | Mehran Modiri | Screenwriter and set designer |
| 2005 | Kamarband ha ra Bebandim | Mehdi Mazloumu | Screenwriter |
| 2004-2005 | Noghtechin | Mehran Modiri | Screenwriter |
| 2003 | Pavarchin | Mehran Modiri | Screenwriter and set designer |
| 2003 | Without Description | Mehdi Mazloumi | Screenwriter |
| 2000 | Pelake 14 | Mehran Modiri | Screenwriter |
| 2000 | Bebakhshid Shoma? | Mehran Modiri | Screenwriter and set designer |
| 1996 | Asheghaneh | Alireza Davoudnejad | Constume Designer |
