= Shakib Shajareh =

- شکیب شجره
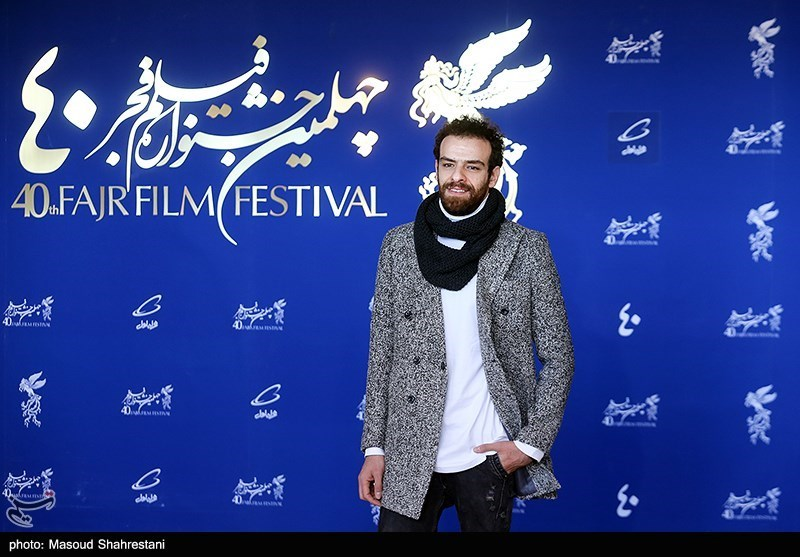
- Shajareh at the 2022
- Born: August 23, 1988 (age 37); Tehran, Iran
- Occupations: actor; acting instructor
- Years active: 2008–present

Shakib Shajareh ((Persian: شکیب شجره, born 23 August 1989) is an Iranian film, theatre, and home video network actor. He was nominated for Best Actor at the 13th Iran Theatre Actors Celebration for his performance in Azhdahak (2016), a play written and directed by Bahram Beyzaie, and at the 20th Hafez Awards for his performance in the home video Heyula TV series (The Monster) (2019), directed by Mehran Modiri. He rose to prominence for his performance in the feature film Aroosi-ye Mardom (People's Wedding) directed by Majid Tavakoli.

== Education ==
Shajareh holds a bachelor's degree in Theoretical Physics from the Science and Research Branch of Islamic Azad University and a master's degree in Acting from the University of Wollongong, Australia. In addition to acting, he has worked as an acting researcher and instructor and has conducted numerous acting workshops in Iran and abroad.

== Career ==
Shajareh gained recognition as a stage actor for his performances in Matarsak (Scarecrow) (2013), directed by Hassan Majouni, Tahavoo (Nausea) (2018), directed by Maryam Barzegar, and Eshgh-e Roozhaye Corona (Love in the Days of Corona) (2022), directed by Mohammad Rahmanian. He rose to prominence through his roles in the home video series Heyula (2019), directed by Mehran Modiri, and the feature films Khoob, Bad, Jelof 2: Artesh-e Seri (Good, Bad, Jelf 2: The Secret Army) (2019), directed by Peyman Ghasemkhani, Enferadi (Solitary) (2022), directed by Masoud Atyabi, and Aroosi-ye Mardom (People's Wedding) (2023), directed by Majid Tavakoli. His other acting credits include the feature films Be Vaght-e Tolou: Musa Kalim Allah (At Dawn: Moses, the Interlocutor of God) (2024), directed by Ebrahim Hatamikia, Kha'en-Koshi (Traitor Killing) (2021), directed by Masoud Kimiai, Raghs-e Dolphinha (Dance of the Dolphins) (2023), directed by Alireza Amini, and the home video series Pedarkhandeh (The Godfather) and Artesh-e Seri (The Secret Army), both directed by Saeed Aboutaleb and released in 2022 and 2023, respectively.

In May 2020, during an appearance on the television program Dorehami, Shajareh stated that he is the nephew of Sadruddin Shajareh, an Iranian announcer, television host, voice actor, actor, and director.

== Filmography ==
=== Cinema ===
Year	Title	Director	Producer	Note	source
2019	Khoob, Bad, Jelof 2: Artesh-e Seri (Good, Bad, Jelf 2: The Secret Army)	Peyman Ghasemkhani	Mohsen Chegini	Actor	
2021	Kha'en-Koshi (Traitor Killing)	Masoud Kimiai	Ali Oji	Actor	
2022	Enferadi (Solitary)	Masoud Atyabi	Seyyed Ebrahim Amerian	Actor	
2023	Aroosi-ye Mardom (People's Wedding)	Majid Tavakoli	Ali Sartipi	Actor	
2023	Raghs-e Dolphinha (Dance of the Dolphins)	Alireza Amini	Siavash Aminpour	Actor	
2024	Be Vaght-e Tolou: Musa Kalim Allah (At Dawn: Moses, the Interlocutor of God)	Ebrahim Hatamikia	Seyyed Mahmoud Razavi	Actor	
2024	Dast Tanha (Empty-Handed)	Amirhossein Saghafi	Amirhossein Saghafi	Actor	
2026	Gomshodeh (The Missing)	Maryam Barzegar	Ali Akbar Saghafi	Actor	
2026	Janeshin (The Successor)	Mehdi Shahmohammadi	Rouhollah Sohrabi	Actor	

=== television ===
Year	Title	Director	Producer	Notes	source
2020	Dorehami	Mehran Modiri	Ali Asghari	Guest	
2026	Man Iranam (I Am Iran)	Mohammadreza Shahidi Fard	Mohammad Sharifi	Guest	

=== Home-video ===
Year	Title	Director	Producer		source
2019	Khoob, Bad, Jelf 2: Radioactive (Good, Bad, Jelf 2: Radioactive)	Peyman Ghasemkhani - Mohsen Chegini	Mohsen Chegini	Actor	
2019	Heyula (Monster)	Mehran Modiri	Seyyed Mostafa Ahmadi	Actor	
2023	Pedarkhandeh (The Godfather)	Saeed Aboutaleb	Saeed Aboutaleb	Participant	
2023	Artesh-e Seri (The Secret Army)	Saeed Aboutaleb	Saeed Aboutaleb	Participant	
2024	Oscar	Mehran Modiri	Mohammad Sharifi - Kajal Nouri	Participant	
2026	Rok Show	Majid Vashghani	Unknown / Not publicly credited	Guest	

== Awards and nominations ==
Award	Year	Category	Nominated Work	Result	Ref.
The Theater Forum's Actor Celebration (Youth Category)	2016	Best Actor	Azhdahak	Nominated	
Hafez Awards	2019	Best Comedy Actor	series Heyula	Nominated	
