= Mohsen Chegini =

Iranian film producer

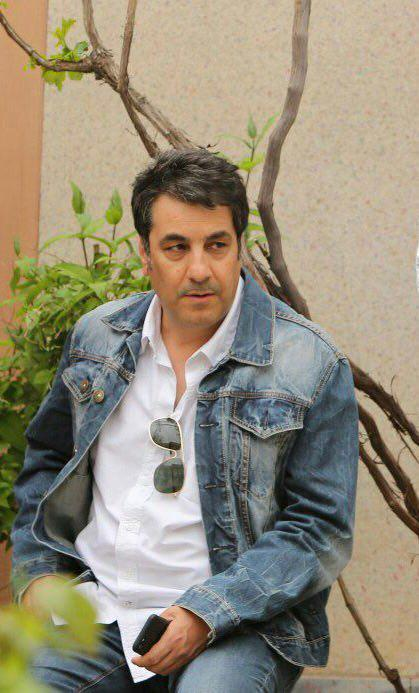
- Born: 26 June 1967 (age 58); Arak, Markazi Province, Iran
- Occupations: film producer; Film director
- Years active: 1994–present
- Notable work: Pejman (TV series) (2012-2013); Doctors' Building (TV series) (2011); Char Khooneh (2007); Barareh Nights (2005)

Mohsen Chegini (Persian: محسن چگینی; born 26 June 1967) is an Iranian film producer and director. He is best known for producing Popular Comedy TV shows such as The Good, The Bad, and The Corny, Barareh Nights, Doctors' Building, On Tiptoes and The Dots.

== Filmography ==
=== Movies ===
Title	Credit	Director	Year
The Good, the Bad, the Corny II	Producer	Peyman Ghasemkhani	2019
The Good, the Bad, the Corny	Producer	Peyman Ghasemkhani	2016
Tokyo, Non-Stop	Executive Producer	Saeed Alamzadeh	2002
‌White Dream	Executive Producer	Hamid Jebeli	2001
Sunglasses	Executive Producer	Mohammad Hossein Latifi	2000
Unforgiven	Director Assistant	Iraj Ghaderi	1996
Virangar	Director Assistant	Abolqasem Talebi	1995
The Enemy	Director Assistant	Abbas Babooyehi	1995
The Poor Lover	Director Assistant	Hossein Ali Layalestani	1995
Sarboland	Director Assistant	Fathali Oveisi	1994

=== Television ===
Title	Credit	Director	Year
The Good, the Bad, the Corny: Radioactive	Producer and Director	Mohsen Chegini	2020
Rift	Producer	Alireza Bazrafshan	2016
Geranium	Producer	Soroush Sehhat	2015
Pejman	Producer	Soroush Sehhat	2013
Thief and Police	Producer	Saeed Aghakhani	2012
Police Taxi	Producer	Saeed Alamzadeh	2011
Doctors' Building	Producer	Soroush Sehhat	2010
Travellers	Producer	Rambod Javan	2009
Char Khooneh	Producer	Soroush Sehhat	2007
Barareh Nights	Producer	Mehran Modiri	2005
Great Award	Executive Producer	Mehran Modiri	2004
The Dots	Executive Producer	Mehran Modiri	2003
On Tiptoes	Executive Producer	Mehran Modiri	2002
Swallows Return	Director Assistant	Abolqasem Talebi	1997
Two Windows	Director Assistant	Pasha Shahandeh	1996
