= Hadi Kazemi =

Iranian actor

- هادی کاظمی
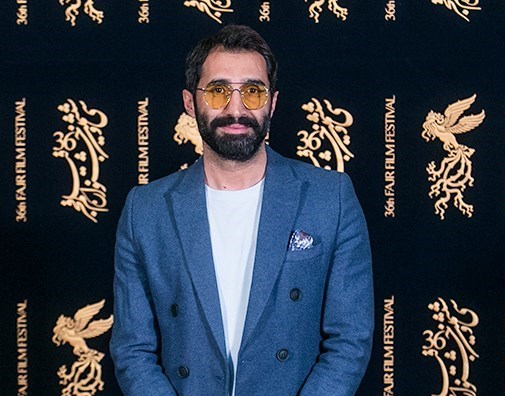
- Kazemi at the 36th Fajr Film Festival
- Born: 4 November 1976 (age 49); Tabriz, Iran
- Education: Acting
- Occupations: Actor; narrator; sculptor; painter; photographer
- Years active: 1996–present
- Spouse: Samaneh Pakdel (m. 2018)

Hadi Kazemi (Persian: هادی کاظمی; born 4 November 1976) is an Iranian actor, narrator, sculptor, painter and photographer. He is known for his roles as Nezam Du Barareh in comedy series Barareh Nights, and Baba Shah in Bitter Coffee, both television series directed by Mehran Modiri.

== Biography ==
Hadi Kazemi is the second oldest of four brothers. Hadi graduated from the Malek-Ashtar University of Technology with a diploma in graphic design and later on went to get his bachelor's degree in acting from the Tehran University of Art. On the side, Hadi works with two of his brothers Hamed and Tohid Kazemi with their duo music group D,Kr.

== Filmography ==
=== Film ===
- Khab Foroosh, 2009
- Shab Be Yade Mandani, 2010
- Kolahbardar, 2010
- Kar-e Kazeb, Morad, 2010
- 50 Kilo Albaloo, 2016
- Iran Burger, 2015
- Fossil, 2023

=== Television ===
- Pavarchin, 2002
- Mehman-e Madarbozorg, 2003
- Sefr Darajeh, 2004
- Shabekeye Se-o-nim, 2004
- Shabhaye Barareh, 2005 - 2006 - Nezam Du Barareh
- Faza Navardan, 2007 - Various Characters
- Baghe Mozaffar, 2007 - Nima
- Mahe Asal, 2007 - Barat
- Dar Cheshm-e Baad, 2008
- Bi Tabi, 2009
- Marde Do Hezar Chehreh, 2009
- Sefid Emza, 2010
- Ghahve-ye Talkh, 2010 - Baba Shah
- Bahaneyi Baraye Boodan, 2011
- Bidar Bash, 2012
- Vilaye Man, 2012 Khatoon Abadi
- I'm Just Kidding, 2013
- King of Ear, 2013 Zohreh
- Salhaye Door Az Khane, 2019 Zohreh
- Zaferani, 2016 Mashallah
- Aspirin, 2016 Farhad
- Alalbadal, 2017 Khorram
