= I'm Just Kidding =

- شوخی کردم
- Created by: Mehran Modiri
- Written by: Main cast: Khashayar Alvand; Amir Mahdi Jule; Hamid Barzegar; Elahe hZarenejad Other: Javad Rajabi; Reza Shafiei Jam; Mohammad Safajooei; Masoud Marashi
- Directed by: Mehran Modiri
- Starring: Mehran Modiri; Siamak Ansari; Mehran Ghafourian; Javad Razavian; Reza Shafiei Jam; Nader Soleimani; Rabeh Oskouie; Laleh Saburi; Nasrollah Radesh; Hadi Kazemi; Mohammad-Reza Hedayati; Nima Fallah; Saed Hedayai; Sahar Valadbeigi; Bijan Banafshekhah; Shabnam Farshadjoo; Aref Lorestani; Sepand Amirsoleimani; Kamand Amirsoleimani
- Country of origin: Iran
- No. of episodes: 24

Production
- Executive producer: Arash Behjo
- Producer: Mehran Modiri
- Editors: Amir Adibparvar; Shahriar Rahimirad
- Running time: 80 min

Original release
- Release: March 2014 – August 2014

I Was Joking or I Was Kidding is a home video series directed by Mehran Modiri, presented in a sketch comedy format. It was prepared for home video release in 2013. The series comprises various segments such as "Operating Room," "News," "Suspect and Inspector," and more. Each episode humorously addresses a specific topic through these segments. After all episodes were released, the program, with significant censorship, aired in 13 episodes during Nowruz 2017 at 11 PM on Channel 5.

After completing the filming of the series "My Villa" in 2012, Mehran Modiri began pre-production on "I Was Joking," featuring over 67 prominent Iranian comedians from the past 20 years. Modiri, as the host of this series, humorously and critically discusses various topics.

== Segments ==
- Host Segments: Mehran Modiri speaks at the beginning, middle, and end of each episode as the host of the show.
- Operating Room: This sketch takes place in an operating room during surgery. Mehran Modiri plays an irritable and foul-mouthed surgeon.
- Stone Age: Set in the Stone Age, this segment features early humans. Actors include Mehran Ghafourian, Arash Nozari, Rabeea Oskooi, Felamak Jenidi, and Darya Moradi-Dasht.
- Suspect and Inspector: This segment includes dialogues between Mehran Ghafourian as a calm and seasoned criminal and Sam Nouri as a bad-tempered inspector. The viewers never see the inspector's face; they only hear his voice.
- Experienced Couple: This sketch depicts the memories of a foolish and talkative elderly couple who lost their child due to their stupidity. Hadi Kazemi plays the husband, and Shabnam Farshadjoo plays the wife.
- News: Presented in a news format, this segment features Elika Abdolrazaghi, Mehran Modiri, and occasionally Siamak Ansari and Aref Lorestani as news anchors.
- Literary Critique: Set in a poetic literary gathering, Mehran Modiri plays a famous poet who reads, evaluates, and critiques poetry.
- Family Counselor: This segment parodies satellite TV counseling programs, where experts are consulted via phone. Mehran Modiri (in collection 2) and Yousef Sayadi (in collection 4) play the counselor roles.

== Distribution ==
Each time the series was released, it was distributed as a DVD containing two episodes, both focusing on a single theme.

== Cast ==
- Nader Soleimani,
- Laleh Sabouri,
- Nasrullah Radesh,
- Shagaiq Rahimi Rad,
- Hadi Kazemi,
- Mohammad Reza Hedayati,
- Saed Hedayati,
- Aref Lorestani,
- Sahar Voldebigi,
- Nima Falah,
- Sepand Amir Soleimani,
- Kamand Amirsoleimani
- Shabnam Farshadjoo
- Sahar Zakaria
- Hoda Zeinolabedin

== See also ==
- Mehran Modiri
