= Fatemeh Hashemi =

Iranian actress

- فاطمه هاشمی
- Born: February 11, 1969 (age 56); Bandar Anzali, Iran
- Occupation: Actress

Fatemeh Hashemi (born February 11, 1969) is an Iranian television actress.

== Career ==
Fatemeh Hashemi is an Iranian actress. She born in Iran, Anzali port & completed her primary education. She generally plays and acts in the genre of comedy on Iran television and appeared in movies & different television series like as Parvaz 57, Sa'ate khosh, Harf to Harf, Az khastegari ta Ezdevaj, Shabhaye Barareh, Ghahve-ye Talkh, Shoukhi Kardam.

== Selected filmography ==
Year	Title	Director	Character
1994	Parvaz 57	Mehran Modiri	
1995	Sa'ate Khosh (Happy Hour)	Mehran Modiri	
1996	Sun Flowers	Masoud Shahmohammadi	
1995	39	Dariush Kardan	
2000	Az khastegari ta Ezdevaj		
2005–2006	Shabhaye Barareh	Mehran Modiri	Shakhe Shemshad
2007	Dobare Zendegi	Nader Moghadas	Shokat
2010	Ghahve-ye Talkh	Mehran Modiri	Hamdam
1996	Sun Flowers	Masoud Shahmohammadi	
2002	Atiyeh	Arjang Amirfazli	
2003	Afsaneye Share Hert	Saeed Chari	
2013	Colonel Garden	Flora Sam	Azam
2013	Shoukhi Kardam	Mehran Modiri	
2011	Khabam Miad	Reza Attaran	
2014	Dar Hashiye	Mehran Modiri	
2015	Shahre Gomshode	Shahab Abbasi	
2017	Tatilate Royaee	Alireza Amini	
2018	Confidential	Moslem Tehrani	
2019	Chay Net	Arash Teymour nezhad	
2019	Shapaloutka	Hossein Ghenaat	
