= Amir Mahdi Jule =

Iranian comedy actor and screenwriter

- امیرمهدی ژوله
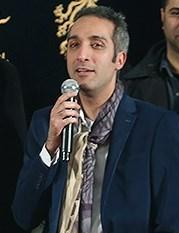
- Jule in 2017
- Born: 18 August 1980 (age 46); Tehran, Iran
- Occupations: Actor; screenwriter
- Years active: 2002–present
- Height: 1.86 m (6 ft 1 in)
- Children: 1

Amir Mahdi Jule (Persian: امیرمهدی ژوله, also Romanized as Amir Mehdi Jule, born 27 August 1980 in Tehran) is an Iranian screenwriter and actor.

He wrote 5 O'clock in the afternoon, Man of Many Faces (2017), Barareh Nights and Bitter Coffee, He is the author of the Mehran Modiri comedy series. He acted in The Good, the Bad, the Gaudy movie.

== Personal life ==
Jule is married. His daughter's name is Gandom. He is afflicted with multiple sclerosis and describes his experience in a television program. He wrote of the country's censorship of female actors on television (Shaghayegh Dehghan in Barareh Nights film) Jule kicked off a campaign with the hashtag #Censorship_and_I, talking about the challenges of depicting women's bodies.

Amir Mahdi Jule became aware of his diagnosis with Multiple Sclerosis (MS) at the age of 22, which exempted him from military service. He continues to live his life by managing and controlling this condition.

== Filmography ==
=== Writer ===
- Without Description - 2002
- The Dots – 2003
- Fasten Our Seatbelt – 2004
- Barareh Nights – 2005
- Mozaffar's Garden – 2006
- Living on the condition of laughing – 2006
- Mozaffar's Treasure (home screen) – 2007
- Man of Many Faces (TV series) – 2008
- Two-Thousand Face Man – 2008
- Bitter Coffee (home screen) – 2010–09
- My Villa (home screen) – 2012
- I'm just kidding (home screen) – 2013
- At the Margin – 2014
- Sneezing (home screen) – 2015
- At the Margin 2 – 2015
- 5 O'clock in the afternoon – 2017
- Shishlik – 2021

=== Actor ===
- Dorehami – 2016
- The Good, the Bad & the Corny (Peyman Ghasem Khani – 2016)
- Wall to the Wall – 2016
- Golshifteh – 2017
- Hezarpa – 2017
- Tsunami – 2018
- Samurai in Berlin – 2018

=== Theater ===
- A Midsummer Night's Dream – 2016 (Tehran, Fajr International Theater Festival, Shakespeare Theater Festival in Poland)
- Play It Again Sam – 2016
- Fourth generation operator – 2017
- A relaxing colck – 2019
