= Sahar Valadbeigi =

Iranian actress (born 1978)

- سحر ولدبیگی
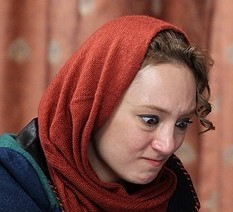
- Born: June 22, 1977 (age 48); Tehran, Iran
- Occupation: Actress
- Years active: 1995–present
- Spouse: Nima Fallah (m. 1998)
- Relatives: Masoud Valadbeigi (father)

Sahar Valadbeigi (Persian: سحر ولدبیگی; born 22 June 1978) is an Iranian actress. She got famous when she participated in some of popular Mehran Modiri's soap operas in 90's and 2000's such as Pavarchin and Noghtechin. Her husband is Nima Fallah, an Iranian actor.

== Selected filmography ==
=== Series ===
- Dorehami
- I'm just kidding
- Armando
- Dar Hashie
- Ghore
- Masire Enherafi
- Ab Pariya
- Rich and Poor (TV series)
- Gomshodeh
- Mahe Asal
- Char Khooneh
- The Dots (TV series)
- On Tiptoes
- Dokhtaran
- Be Mesle Bahar
- Salam Zendegi

=== Cinema ===
- Single 40 years old
- Shahre Mosh ha 2
- Yek Farari az bebgo
- Shirin
- Khale Soske
- Age MItoni Mano Begir
- Age Mitoni Mano Bekosh
- Ghelghelak
- Ezdevaj Ghiabi
