= Mozaffar's Garden =

- Also known as: Baghe Mozaffar
- Genre: Comedy
- Written by: Peyman Ghasem Khani - Amir mahdi jule
- Directed by: Mehran Modiri
- Starring: Mehran Modiri; Siamak Ansari; Mohammad-Reza Hedayati; Sahar Jafari Jozani; Nasrollah Radesh; Ali Lakpourian; Reza Shafiei Jam; Nader Soleimani; Elika Abdolrazaghi; Shaghayegh Dehghan
- Narrated by: Mehran Modiri
- Country of origin: Iran
- Original language: Persian
- No. of episodes: 40

Production
- Producers: Hamid Aghagolian; Majid Aghagolian
- Production locations: Tehran, Iran
- Editor: Javad Aslani
- Running time: 45 minutes
- Production company: Islamic Republic of Iran Broadcasting

Original release
- Network: IRIB TV3
- Release: 1 September – 15 October 2006

Related
- Barareh Nights; Mozaffar's Treasure

Mozaffar's Garden (Persian: باغ مظفر) is a 2006 Iranian satire television series. It was directed by Mehran Modiri, who also narrates and stars as the title character. It ran from 1 September to 15 October 2006, with reruns continuing through 2007.

== Plot ==
Siamak Ansari stars as Kamran, a strange young man who works at a transportation company run by Mr. Bordbaar, a fat man who is easily amused by everything. Mr. Bordbaar and his son are careless people, and Kamran is the only person who does any work at the company. Kamran is shy, hard-working, and a stranger to the Bordbaar family. Kamran is also in love with Nazi, Mr. Bordbaar's daughter, who still has feelings for her old fiancé. Kamran is too shy to show his feelings for Nazi. Kamran's father, "Mozaffar Khan Zargande," is a Khan who lives his life like old Tehran Khans.

Kamran has a sister, Forough Khanoom. She is snobby, spoiled, and does whatever she likes to do. She is a widow, and her past husbands have been killed by strange accidents that have something to do with how mean she is. The family has a servant named Heif-e-nan, which means "worthless". He craves abuse from his masters. They also have a sloppy, worthless lawyer named Jamshid, who is trying to get the family to sell the garden. According to Jamshid, Tehran is going to have a highway that runs through the garden and they should sell it before the price drops drastically. The Zargande family live in a huge garden which is shared by Mozaffar Khan's Cousin, Mansour Khan. Mansour Khan, suffers from short term memory-loss, hates his cousin, and is old with no family of his own. As the story progresses, Kamran pursues his love while juggling his odd family responsibilities.

== Cast ==
=== Garden residents ===
- Mehran Modiri as Mozaffar Khan and the narrator
- Siamak Ansari as Kamran
- Mohammad-Reza Hedayati as Mansoor Khan
- Sahar Jafari Jozani as Forough Khanoom
- Nasrollah Radesh as Heif-e-nan
- Ali Lakpourian as Jamshid
- Reza Shafiei Jam as Gholmorad

=== The Bordbaars ===
- Nader Soleimani as Mr. Mehrdad Bordbaar
- Elika Abdolrazaghi as Mrs. Mahnaz Bordbaar
- Shaghayegh Dehghan as Nazi Bordbaar

=== Recurring ===
- Behnoosh Bakhtiari as Sheida and Ashraf
- Hadi Kazemi as Nima
- Saeid Pirdoost as Kambiz
- Saed Hedayati as Parviz

== See also ==
- Noghtechin
- Pavarchin
- Comedy films in cinema of Iran
- Mehran Modiri filmography
