= Hushang Harirchiyan =

Iranian actor (1932–2024)

- هوشنگ حریرچیان
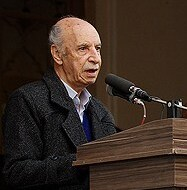
- Harirchiyan in 2015
- Born: 11 August 1932; Isfahan, Persia
- Died: 20 August 2024 (aged 92)
- Citizenship: Iranian
- Occupations: Actor; comedian
- Years active: 1948–2024
- Notable work: Pejman; Hasht Behesht; Doctors' Building

Hushang Harirchiyan (Persian: هوشنگ حریرچیان; 11 August 1932 – 20 August 2024) was an Iranian comedian and actor.

== Biography ==
Harirchiyan started his career with theater in Isfahan and in 1948, he starred for the first time in a television film. Since then, he has acted in many films and series. He contracted the coronavirus in 2020 and recovered after a while. After that, he said, "I will not play anymore so that I do not get the coronavirus again." He has collaborated with many artists such as Ali Hatami, Soroush Sehhat, Mohammad Reza Golzar, Danial Hajibarat, Behnam Tashakkor and Elnaz Shakerdoost.

Harirchiyan died on 20 August 2024, at the age of 92.

== Filmography ==
Houshang Harirchiyan has had a prolific career in both cinema and television. Below is a selection of his notable works:

=== Houshang Harirchiyan's original artwork ===
- Once Upon a Time in Iran directed by Morteza Atashzamzam
- Pejman directed by Soroush Sehhat
- Doctors' Building directed by Soroush Sehhat
- Shadow of the Sultan directed by Morteza Atashzamzam
- Hasht Behesht directed by Saeed Alemzadeh
- 2 Sisters directed by Mohammad Banki
- The Chef directed by Mohammad-Reza Honarmand
- A Little Kiss directed by Bahman Farmanara
- The Wind Carpet directed by Kamal Tabrizi
- The Gun Loaded directed by Amrollah Ahmadjoo
- Jafar khan az farang Bargashteh directed by Ali Hatami

=== Cinematic Works (Original Names) ===
- "Vay Ampoul" (2018) - Directed by Alireza Mahmoudzadeh
- "Aziz-e Million Dollar" (2016) - Directed by Omid Niaz
- "Ekhteraa-e Aghajoon" (2013) - Directed by Milad Jarmooz
- "Limo Torosh" (2010)
- "Voroud-e Zendeha Mamnoo" (2009) - Directed by Javad Mazdabadi
- "Do Khahar" (2008) - Directed by Mohammad Banki
- "Poost-e Mooz" (2008) - Directed by Ali Atshani
- "Ghanoon-e Bazi" (2006) - Directed by Ahmadreza Motamedi
- "Yek Booseh Koochooloo" (2005) - Directed by Bahman Farmanara
- "Koodakaneh" (2002) - Directed by Reza Mihin-Doust
- "Farsh-e Baad" (2002) - Directed by Kamal Tabrizi
- "Gahi Be Aseman Negah Kon" (2002) - Directed by Kamal Tabrizi
- "Jafar Khan Az Farang Bargashteh" (1987) - Directed by Ali Hatami

=== Television Works (Original Names) ===
- "Khatoon" (2015) - Directed by Morteza Atashzamzam
- "Pezhman" (2013) - Directed by Soroush Sehat
- "Saye-ye Soltan" (2012) - Directed by Morteza Atashzamzam
- "Sakhteman Pezeshkan" (2011) - Directed by Soroush Sehat
- "Ashpaz Bashi" (2010) - Directed by Mohammadreza Honarmand
- "Tofang-e Sarpar" (2002) - Directed by Amrollah Ahmadjoo
- "Yeki Bood Yeki Nabood"
- "Hasht Behesht" (1990) - Directed by Saeed Alamzadeh
- "Akkas Bashi" (1969) - Directed by Akbar Khajavi
