= Behnoosh Bakhtiari =

Iranian actress (born 1975)

- بهنوش بختیاری
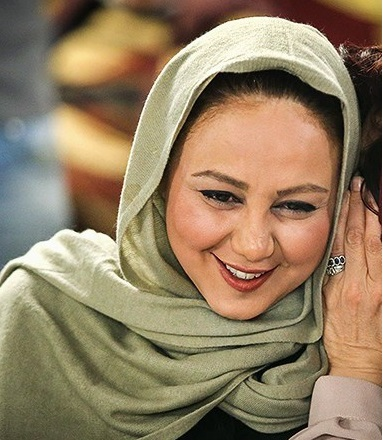
- Born: 19 May 1975 (age 50); Tehran, Iran
- Occupation: Actress
- Years active: 1996–present
- Spouse: Mohammad Reza Arian (m. 2007)

Behnoosh Bakhtiari (Persian: بهنوش بختیاری, born 19 May 1975) is an Iranian actress.

She has a bachelor's degree in French from the Islamic Azad University, Tehran Branch. Bakhtiari was nominated for the Crystal Simorgh for Best Supporting Actress at the 34th Fajr Film Festival in 2015 for her role in my film.

== Filmography ==
=== TV Series ===
Year	Title	Title in English	Director	Character
2022	Parole		Masoud Dehnamaki	
2020	Moochin	Tweezers	Hossein Tabrizi	Zafarmand
2014	Eshgh Tatil Nist	Love is not Closed	Bijan Birang	
2010	Dara va Nadar	Rich and Poor	Masoud Dehnamaki	
2009	Eyde Emsal	This Years New Year	Saeed Aghakhani	Mahtab
2005	Jayezeh-ye Bozorg	The Grand Prize	Mehran Modiri	Fariba Jamali
2005-2006	Shabha-ye Barareh	Barareh Nights	Mehran Modiri	Leiloon Bala Barareh
2007	Bagh-e Mozaffar	Mozaffar's Garden	Mehran Modiri	Sheyda/Ashraf
2007	Char Khooneh	Plaid	Soroush Sehhat	Parastoo
2002	Under the City's Skin	Under the City's Skin	Mehran Ghafourian	Forough

=== Movies ===
Year	Title	Director
2020	The Badger	Kazem Mollaie
2019	Prisoners (2019 film)	Masoud Dehnamaki
2016	50 Kilos of Sour Cherries	Mani Haghighi
2011	To Va Man	Mohammad Banki
2011	Ekhrajiha 3	Masoud Dehnamaki
2011	Shy Groom	Arash Moayerian
2010	2 Sisters	Mohammad Banki
2009	Checkmate	Jamshid Heidari
