= Aref Lorestani =

Iranian actor

- Born: February 4, 1972; Kermanshah, Iran
- Died: April 15, 2017 (aged 45); Tehran, Iran
- Resting place: Simeneh-ye Olya, Iran
- Occupations: Actor, comedian
- Years active: 1998–2017
- Notable work: Acacia Alley; I'm just kidding Bitter Coffee

Aref Lorestani (Persian: عارف لرستانی; February 4, 1972 – April 15, 2017) was an Iranian actor. Lorestani started his professional career by playing a role in a sitcom, dubbed Jong-e 77, by famous Iranian director Mehran Modiri, in 1998 and continued appearing in a later series including Man With Two Thousand Faces (2009), Bitter Coffee (2010), My Villa (2012), I'm just kidding (2014) and In the Margins (2015).

He also appeared in several of Mehran Modiri's Television shows, one of the most famous one was Qahveye Talkh (Bitter Coffee) playing the role of a corrupt policeman. the first episodes of which were released in 2010.

Lorestani also played roles in a number of movies, including Mani and Neda, by Parviz Sabri, Moadeleh (Equation) and Sham-e Arousi (Wedding Dinner) both by Ebrahim Vahidzadeh and Entekhab (Selection) by Touraj Mansouri.
