= Mohammad-Reza Hedayati =

Iranian actor

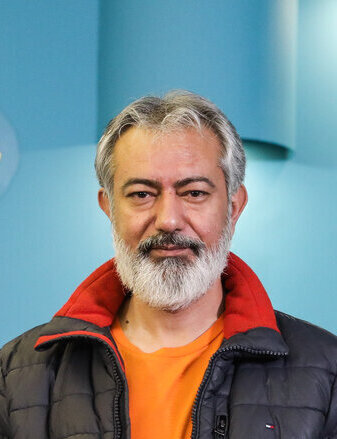
- Hedayati in 2025
- Born: 14 May 1973 (age 53); Chabahar, Sistan and Baluchestan province, Iran
- Education: Soore University; BA in Theatre
- Occupations: Actor, singer
- Years active: 1998–present
- Spouse: Lida Ansari
- Children: 1

Mohammad-Reza Hedayati (Persian: محمدرضا هدایتی, born 14 May 1973 in Zabol) is an Iranian actor. He is known for his comedy roles in TV series directed by Mehran Modiri.

== Music album ==
=== Track list ===
- To (in English : You)
- Polha (in English : Bridges)
- Yadete (in English : Do You Remember?)
- Aber (in English : Passer By )
- Nimkat Choobi (in English : Wooden Bench )
- Sekeye Khorshid (in English : The Coin of the Sun)
- Barg O Bad (in English : The Leaf and the Wind )
- Divarha (in English : The Walls )
- Medley (in English : Medley)

=== Singles ===
- Moshtagh (in English : WISTFUL)
- Saye (in English : Shadow)
- Yadeteh (in English : Do You Remember?)
- Sistani (in English : Sistani)

== Filmography ==
=== TV series ===
- Marde Do Hezar Chehreh (in English : Two-Thousand Face Man)
- Bagh-e Mozaffar (in English : Mozaffar's Garden)
- Dastan-haye Noroozi (The Adventures of Noroozi)
- Dar Cheshm-e Baad (In the eye of the wind)
- Vakil-e Mahalleh (Neighborhood's Advocate)
- Afzooneh khah-e kouchak
- Sefr darajeh (Zero Degree)
- Shab-haye Barareh (Nights of Barareh)
- Noghteh-chin (Dotted)
- Pavarchin (Tiptoes)
- Pelak-e 14 (No. 14)
- Bebakhshid Shoma? (Excuse me, You?)
- Ghahve-ye Talkh (Bitter Coffee)
- Dor zadan mamnoo

=== Cinema ===
- Bivafa (Unfaithful)
- Sham-e arousi (Wedding Dinner)
- Elaheh-ye Zigoratte
- Dalghak (The Clown)
- Rooz-e Karnameh (Report-card Day)
- Keesh O Maat (Checkmate)
- Iran Burger

== See also ==
- Seyyed Javad Razavian
- Siamak Ansari
- Reza Shafiei Jam
