= Shaghayegh Dehghan =

Iranian actress (b. 1979)

- شقایق دهقان
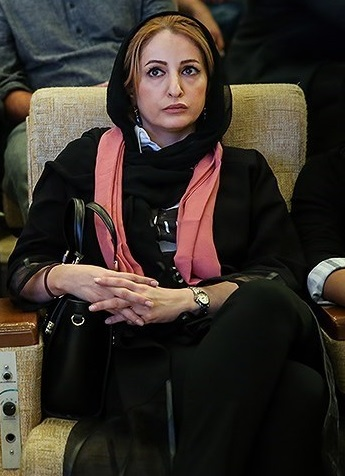
- Born: 1 February 1979 (age 47); Giessen, West Germany
- Occupation: Actress
- Years active: 1996–present
- Spouse: Mehrab Ghasemkhani (m. 2002; div. 2018)
- Children: 1

Shaghayegh Dehghan (Persian: شقایق دهقان; born 1 February 1979) is an Iranian actress. She has received three Hafez Awards nominations.

== Career ==
Shaghayegh Dehghan was born in Germany, three months before her family returned to Iran. At the age of 17, she started her career as a puppeteer. She simultaneously turned to writing scripts for children’s TV shows and later made her acting debut, appearing in a movie for kids.

She has appeared in the series Twenty (1998), Tiptoe (2002), Aqaqiya Alley (2003), Barareh Nights (2005), Mozaffar's Garden (2006), The Night Shall Pass (2008), The Man of a Thousand Faces (2007), The Passengers (2009), Stepmother (2010), Medical Building (2011), Detour (2011), Cops and Robbers (2012), Mehrabad (2013) and Pejman (2013). Dehghan has also appeared in movies, including Under the Moonlight (2000), Cinderella (2001) and Treasure of Javaher Poshte (2011).

== Filmography ==
=== Film ===
- Zir-e noor-e-mah (aka Under the moonlight)
- Gohar (directed by Manouchehr Hadi)

=== Web ===
Year	Title	Role	Director	Platform
2013	Mozaffar's Treasure	Nazi	Mehran Modiri	Video CD
2021	Mafia Nights	Herself	Saeid Aboutaleb	Filimo
2021	His Majesty	Malek Jahan Khanom	Hamed Mohammadi	Filimo
2022–2024	Women's Secret Network	Boloor	Afshin Hashemi	Namava
2023	You Only Go Around Once	Parastoo Shirzad	Soroush Sehhat	Filimo, Namava

=== Television ===
- Farda dair ast (directed by Hassan Fathi - 1998)
- Pavarchin (aka Tiptoe - 2002 - TV series)
- Acacia Alley (2003- 2004 - TV series)
- Kamarband ha ra bebandid (aka Fasten your seatbelts)
- Shabhaye Barareh (aka Barare Nights - 2006 - TV series)
- Faza Navardan (2006 - TV series)
- Baghe Mozaffar (aka Mozaffar's Garden - 2007 - TV series)
- Marde Hezar Chehreh (aka Thousand-Face Man - 2008 - TV series)
- Sakhteman Pezeshkan (aka Doctors' Building - 2011 - TV series)
- Pejman (2013 - TV series)
- Dorehami (gathering - 2016 - Telecast)
