= D,Kr =

D,Kr Music
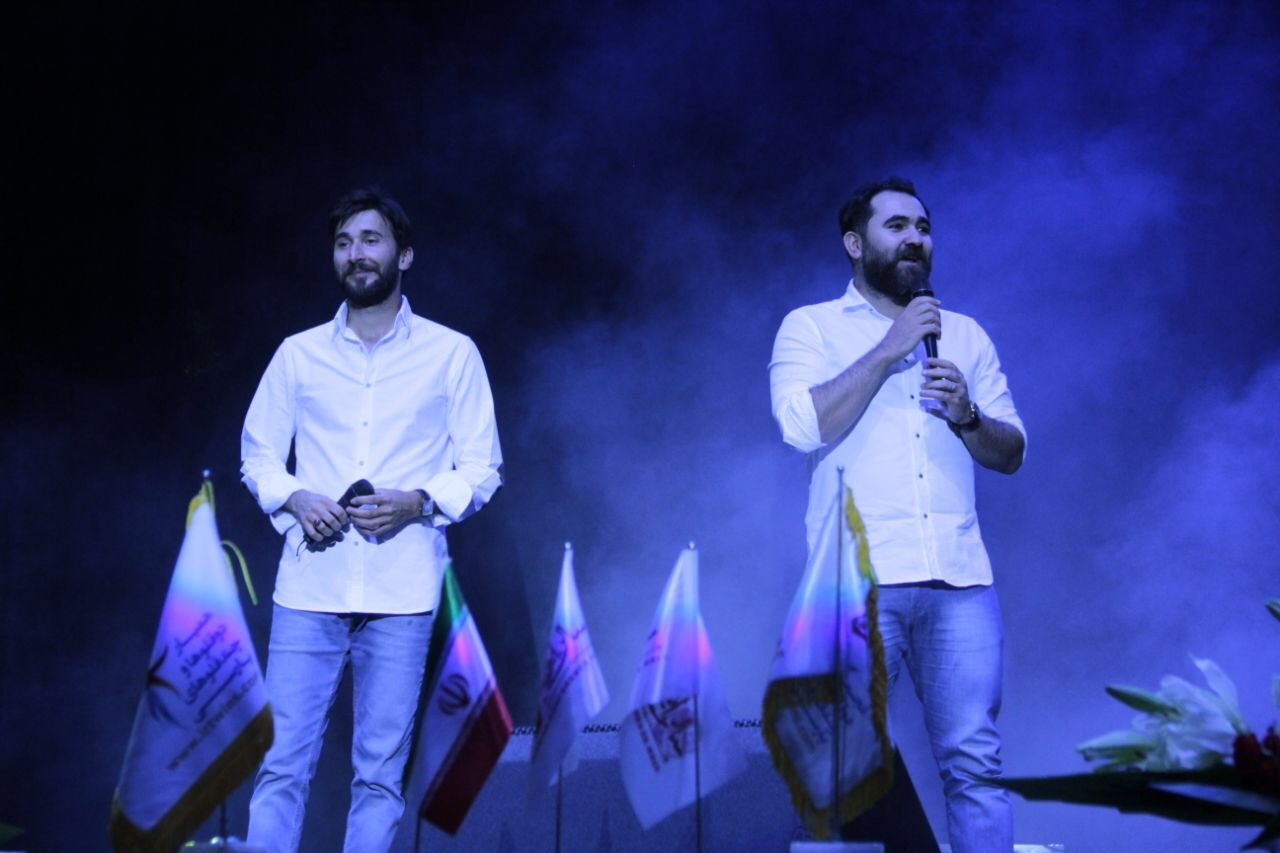
- D,Kr's performance at the Irtwins association, Tehran, Iran
- Occupation: Musicians
- Years active: 2016–present

D,Kr Music (Persian: دِ،کُر موزیک) is a traditional pop duo founded by brothers Hamed and Tohid Kazemi in 2016 in Tehran, Iran. Both having previous solo careers, the brothers found their sound to be more unique when joined together due to their different vocal ranges. Hamed is known for his traditional Persian musical background while Tohid's voice has been distinct for its mix between pop, blues and rock. The music group never decided on a specific genre and have in their interview with Hamahang said, "We refuse to put a name to our genre, as we are our own genre. But we can say we are something between pop and traditional music".

== Career ==
D,Kr Music found attention after Farhad Najafi, the director of the Iranian TV drama Aspirin, cast their brother Hadi Kazemi and by accident heard the brothers' music and wanted them to record a song for the TV shows ending credits. Their further success came with when their songs were released on their Telegram channel, where each release got them between 1,000,000–3,000,000 hits within the first few days. This viral attention landed them a live performance on the Iranian telecast, Khandevane, as well as shows such as Mahe Tamam, Khosha Shiraz, and Delevizion.

In late 2016, D,Kr released their first EP, Love City, a five-track collection on music streaming sites and are currently working on finishing their new album alongside upcoming musicians in the Tehran scene.

== Discography ==
- Love City (2016)
- Nimeye Gomshodeh (2017)

== See also ==
- Hadi Kazemi
