= Reza Shafiei-Jam =

Iranian actor (born 1971)

- رضا شفیعی‌جم
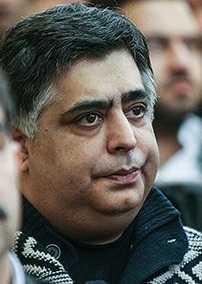
- Born: Ahmad Reza Shafiei-Jam; July 1, 1971 (age 54); Tehran, Iran
- Other name: Reza Shafiee-Jam
- Occupation: Actor
- Years active: 1990–present

Ahmad-Reza Shafiei-Jam (Persian: احمدرضا شفیعی‌جم, born July 1, 1971) is an Iranian actor. He is famous for his roles in comedy TV series and films.

== Filmography ==
=== Cinema ===
- Mard-e Avazi (The Changed Man)
- Ertefa'-e Past (Low Height)
- Soorati
- Joojeh Ordak-e Man (My Duckling)
- Zan-e Badali (The Changed Woman)
- Faza Navardan (The Astronauts)
- Ghelghelak (The Tickle)
- Chahar changooli
- Shy Groom
- Efratiha (Fanatics)
- Wai Ampoul
- Paradise of Criminals

=== Television ===
- Saat-e Khosh (A good time)
- In chand nafar (These several persons)
- Koocheh Aghaghia (Acacia Alley)
- Noghteh-chin (Dotting)—Bamshad
- Bedoon-e sharh (Without Description)
- Jayezeh-ye Bozorg (Grand Prize)—Kambiz
- Shabhaye Barareh (Barareh nights)—Keivoon
- Baghe Mozaffar (Mozaffar's garden)—Gholmorad
- Torsh va Shirin (Sour And Sweet)
- SMS from another World
- Char Khooneh (Plaid)—Hamed

== See also ==
- Mehran Modiri
- Javad Razavian
- Mohammad Reza Hedayati
- Siamak Ansari
