= Bitter Coffee =

- The series poster
- Also known as: Ghahveh Talkh
- Genre: Historical; Comedy
- Created by: Mehran Modiri
- Written by: Amir Mehdi Jule; Khashayar Alvand
- Directed by: Mehran Modiri
- Starring: Mehran Modiri; Siamak Ansari; Javad Ezati; Mohammad Reza Hedayati; Sahar Zakaria; Elika Abdolrazzaghi; Sahar Jafari Jozani
- Country of origin: Iran
- Original language: Persian
- No. of episodes: 102

Production
- Producers: Hamid Aghagolian; Majid Aghagolian
- Production locations: Tehran, Iran
- Editor: Javad Aslani
- Running time: 30–40 minutes

Original release
- Release: September 2010 – 2012

Bitter Coffee (Persian: قهوه تلخ Ghahve-ye Talkh) is an Iranian historical-comedy series directed by Mehran Modiri and produced by Majid Aghagolian and Hamid Aghagolian. Three episodes were released at a time (roughly every week) on three VCD or one DVD, priced in Iran at 25000 rials (at that time approximately $2.50). The first set of episodes was released on 13 September 2010.

== Background and controversy ==
Production of the series began in June 2009. Bitter Coffee was meant to be produced for television, to be broadcast by the IRIB, but due to various disagreements between IRIB and the series' producers, it didn't air. An alleged reason for disagreement between the producers and IRIB was that the producers required all of the advertisement for the series to be used as their payment, but IRIB refused to agree. Another rumoured reason was disagreement about the planned content of the series. IRIB officials eventually refused to show Bitter Coffee, and the series was eventually distributed in VCD format, at various outlets throughout Iran.

== Cast ==
Name	Role	Title in Persian	Regular/Support	Description of Role
Siamak Ansari	Royal Counselor	Mostashar-Ol-Molk	Regular	He is a historian who travels back in time to become a royal counselor, or Mostashar-Ol-Molk.
Mehran Modiri	Great Bluetooth	Bluetooth-e-Kabir	Regular	He is seemingly a defected Greek prince.
Mohammad-Reza Hedayati	King of Iran	Jahangir-shahe Doloo	Regular	He is an aged King of Iran.
Sahar Zakaria	Princess	Lo'bat-Al-Molook	Regular	She, as the eldest daughter of Shah, is single, waiting for her prince of dreams to propose.
Elika Abdol-Razzaghi	Queen of Iran	Fakhr-Ot-Taj	Regular	As Queen, she wants to maintain her authority in the royal enterprise.
Sahar Jafari Jozani	Royal secretary and premier's daughter	Naz Khatoon	Regular	After having her studies finished in France, she returns to Iran to become royal secretary. And she falls in love with Royal Counselor.
Borzoo Arjmand	Army General	Borzoo Khan-e-Sepah Salar	Regular	As a relatively naive man, he only pretends to be in love with premier's daughter to succeed him as the premier.
Aref Lorestani	Royal Sheriff	Balad-Ol-Molk	Regular	Despite being the sheriff, he engages in various illegal activities.
Hadi Kazemi	Father of the King	Baba Shah	Regular	As a painter, his only preoccupation is to rival father of the premier.
Javad Ezzati	Father of the premier	Baba Eti	Regular	Affected by Schizophrenia, he is a source of laughter in the whole series.
Mandana Soori	Shah's sister	Gheysar-Os-Saltaneh	Regular	She's the Shah's twin sister who marries Baba Eti.
Reza Fieze Norouzi	Premier	Etemad-Ol-Molk Deylami	Regular	He is just trying to gather wealth, maintain his position, and succeed Shah.
Maryam Bakhshi	Prime minister's wife and Shah's sister-in-law	Akhtar-Al-Molook	Regular	It seems that her only duty is to covet her sister the Queen and try to convince royal family to accept her son as their son-in-law.
Bijan Banafshekhah	Chief of Iran's colonies and premier's elder son	Bikhodi-Ol-Molk Deylami	Regular	He, as stupid and useless as one can be, is in love with Shah's daughter. The so-called colonies he administers (which do not exist at all) include France, Russia, etc.
Shayan Ahadifar	History Writer and prime minister's younger son	Gonjeshk	Regular	He seems to be the only clever man in whole royal enterprise. However, he deliberately distorts facts he documents to be read by later generations, in order to demonstrate a more humane, clever image of Shah and Premier (his father).
Reza Nikkhah	Royal astrologer and treasurer	Nostra Khan Damoos-Ol-Molk	Regular	His name has something to do with Nostradamus, but he doesn't know how to foresee future as the royal astrologer. Hence, he makes dumb predictions which usually turn to be funny.
Ali Lak-Pooriyan	Royal Jester	Dambool-Os-Saltaneh	Regular	He does every common thing that a jester does.
Shaghayegh Rahimi-Rad		Malih-Os-Saltaneh	Regular	Dambool's wife
Saed Hedayati	Royal doctor	Dava-Ol-Molk	Regular	Only adept in curing simple diseases such as the common cold, he is more of a parasite in the royal enterprise.
Shadi Ahadifar	Court doctress	Zaeef-Os-Saltaneh	Regular	As the wife of Royal Doctor, she deals with some women affairs.
Nader Soleimani	Royal Chef	Gherghi	Regular	As the royal chef, he is sometimes involved in conspiracies planned by other top officials.
Falamak Joneidi	Royal Chef's Wife	Kabootar	Regular	Not only involved in kitchen issues, she is a news source in the royal enterprise, kind of a wire service of old times.
Ramin Pooriman	Royal courtesan	Eghbal Khan	Regular	He organizes the events at court.
Fatemeh Hashemi	Royal midwife	Hamdam	Regular	She tries to be faithful to the Queen, but sometimes betrays her.
Aram Jafari	Russian Lady of the Shah	Katherine the Boy-Maker	Regular	Since the Shah has no son to succeed him, he marries a gorgeous Russian to make a boy. As expected, a tough rivalry occurs between this Russian lady and the Queen.
Sam Noori	Interpreter	French-Os-Saltaneh	Regular	He translates for the foreign guests of the palace, also tries in vain to teach Borzoo French in order for him to win Naz Khatoon's heart.
Hamid Kashani	Royal executioner	Shokoofeh	Regular	Despite his name meaning "blossom", he is very cruel.
Saeid Pirdoost	Owner of a Cafe in Bazaar	Morshed	Regular	He is the wise man of the story.
Ramin Naser-Nasir		Bolookat	Regular	A lawyer who travels back in time and becomes a member of the Royal Senate.
Yousef Sayyadi		Feri-Os-Saltaneh	Regular	A restaurant owner who travels back in time and becomes the diet coach of the Shah.
Arash Nozari		Pari-Al-Doleh	Regular	A building manager who travels back in time and becomes the head of servants. He's in love with Ziba.
Arash Nozari		Ziba	Regular	A stylist who travels back in time. The Shah falls in love with her and tries to convince her to marry him. She desires to become a queen one day.
Darya Aminiyan		Manij-Os-Saltaneh	Support	Damoos's wife
Shima Mo'meni		Kaniz-Os-Saltaneh	Support	Balad's wife
Amir Farzam	Soldier	Bahram	Support	He works for Balad along with Mohsen, in detaining and keeping order in the palace.
Mehdi Nateghi	Soldier	Mohsen	Support	He works for Balad along with Bahram, in detaining and keeping order in the palace.
Azadeh Mehdizadeh		Josephine	Support	Katherine's lady-in-waiting
Biuk Mirzaee	Thug	Teimur	Support	He orchestrates assassination attempts and other crime. He can always be found at the bazaar.
Sepand Amirsoleimani		Arshia	Support	A doorkeeper who works with Pari-Al-Doleh.
Hossein Rahmani Manesh				

== Storyline ==
The series begins with history teacher Nima Zande-Karimi (Siamak Ansari) realising that his extensive research on Persian and world history is of little use to financing his day-to-day life. He is about to leave Tehran for good to go back to his hometown by the name of Darab, when he comes across young university student Roya Atabaki (Sahar Jafari-Jozani) who is researching for her final year dissertation, which is regarding the period 1198–1203, that is said to be a period of turmoil for Iran's ruling elite. Such turmoil that, very few books are available on that period for Roya's research. It is then that Nima receives an anonymous telephone call, which leads him to Niavaran Palace (currently a museum), where he is told to have a coffee and wait. The coffee (which is bitter) is ready and he duly drinks it, his sight becomes hazy, and when he manages to refocus he is in the year 1201 (1822 AD), and the story develops therein.

== Reception ==
This was a very much anticipated series, as are all of Mehran Modiri's works, partly because it had been 4 years since his last major series work Baghe Mozaffar, discounting the two short series he did for the new years 1387 and 88, and partly because it had been rumoured to be ready for release the previous winter, and then the new year period for 89, before eventually being released at the end of the summer of 1389, and not on television but as a DVD release. As a result, according to the series' website, half a million copies of the first installment were sold on the first day of release alone. At first Ghahve-ye Talkh was planned to be a 90-episode comedy series. Story of Bitter Coffee, like recent Modiri works, is focused on critiquing aspects of Iranian social behaviour.
