= On Tiptoes =

Iranian TV sitcom

- Logo
- Also known as: Pavarchin
- Genre: Sitcom
- Written by: Peyman Qasemkhani; Mehran Modiri; Mehrab Qasemkhani; Hamdi Barzegar; Alireza Naser Fasihi
- Directed by: Mehran Modiri
- Starring: Mehran Modiri; Javad Razavian; Siamak Ansari; Mohammad Reza Hedayati; Sahar Zakaria; Shaghayegh Dehghan; Sahar Valadbeigi; Saeid Pirdoost; Saed Hedayati; Vahid Mahindoost; Ebrahim Abadi; Hayedeh Haeri; Kamran Foyouzat; Mokhtar Saeghi
- Country of origin: Iran
- Original language: Persian
- No. of episodes: 130

Production
- Producers: Hamid Aghagolian; Majid Aghagolian
- Production locations: Tehran, Iran
- Editor: Javad Aslani
- Running time: 40-50 Minutes
- Production company: IRIB

Original release
- Network: IRIB TV5
- Release: 10 September 2002 – 10 January 2003

Related
- 90 Nights; The Dots; Barareh Nights

On Tiptoes (Persian: پاورچین) is an Iranian television sitcom serial directed by Mehran Modiri. It was broadcast for the first time by the IRIB on Thursday 10 September 2002 until Thursday 10 January 2003. It could usually be seen every night at 8:00 p.m. Tehran time on Tehran TV, also known as Channel 5 in Iran. Later due to the popularity of the show, episodes were shown in syndication on various Iranian provincial channels as well as IRIB 1 & IRIB 2 for those living out of the country.

Shab-ha-ye Barareh is the prequel to On Tiptoes. Shabhaye Barareh is set in "Barareh" and describes Farhad's family more than fifty years ago. The series also has many of the cast members from other Modiri works such as Noghtechin and Jayezeye Bozorg. In On Tiptoes Modiri plays the role of "Farhad" and "Shir Farhad" (Farhad's father). In Shabhaye Barareh, Modiri is playing the younger version of "Shir Farhad". Shabhaye Barareh also feat"Toghrol", showing him to have had a military career in his youth, hence his strict behavior and attitude.

== Plot summary ==
On Tiptoes's episodes mostly dealt with the situations that Farhad (Mehran Modiri), an architect living in Tehran would end up in along with members of his family and friends. Farhad was originally from a fictional village in Iran, named Barareh. He had moved to Tehran, when he had been accepted into university. He eventually settled in Tehran and married a woman named Mahtab (Sahar Zakaria). The real story though begins when Farhad's cousin, Davoud (Javad Razavian) moves to Tehran from Barareh to find a job. Davoud has very little in terms of education, and still carries a thick accent, showing his Barareh roots. Farhad's sister, Shadi (Sahar Valadbeigi) also has come to Tehran to begin her studies in university. Toghrol (Mohammad-Reza Hedayati), an old man who hates anything related to Barareh is a friend of Mahtab's family, and helps maintain the property which Farhad and his wife live on. Farhad and Davoud are often the recipients of severe beatings from Toghrol. Davoud finds employment at the engineering company Farhad works at. Davoud has to be the tea-boy because of his poor educational background. Davoud slowly starts reminding Farhad of his village's culture and ways, which often would give hilarious results. Davoud would eventually marry Yasaman (Shaghayegh Dehghan), and soon after Mahtab's brother would become a cast member, eventually marrying Farhad's sister.

== Cast ==
- Mehran Modiri - Farhad Barareh/Farhad's father "Shir Farhad Barareh"
- Sahar Zakaria - Mahtab Mahtabi
- Javad Razavian - Davoud Barareh/Davood's Father
- Siamak Ansari - Sepehr Mahtabi
- Shaghayegh Dehghan - Yasaman
- Sahar Valadbeigi - Shadi Barareh
- Mohammad-Reza Hedayati - Toghrol
- Ebrahim Abadi - Mr.Mahtabi
- Hayedeh Haeri - Ms.Mahtabi
- Saeid Pirdoost - Raees
- Saed Hedayati - Saeed Saeedi
- Vahid Mahindoost - Vahid
- Haydeh Haeri - Mother of Mahtab and Sepehr
- Sepand Amirsoleimani - Son of Raees
- Hadi Kazemi - Hessam Dobarareh
- Ateneh Faghih Nasiri - Friend of Shadi
- Shahab Abbasi - Ab Dozdak
- Negar Foroozandeh - Nazanin
- Asghar Heidari - Friend of Farhad
- Hassan Shokohi - Azizkhan

== Writers ==
- Head Writer: Peyman Qasemkhani
- Writers: Mehrab Qasemkhani, Reza Moti, Alireza Nazr Fasihi, Amir Mahdi Jule, Khashayar Alvand
