= Javad Razavian =

Iranian actor

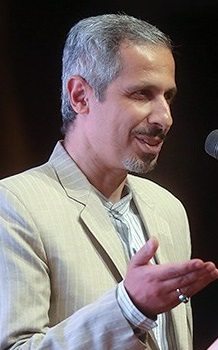
- Razavian in 2016
- Born: 28 July 1974 (age 52); Qom, Iran
- Education: Bachelor of painting
- Occupations: Actor; voice actor; singer; writer; TV presenter; director
- Years active: 1994–present
- Height: 1.73 m (5 ft 8 in)
- Children: 1

Seyed Javad Razavian (Persian: سید جواد رضویان) (born 28 July 1974) is an Iranian actor, voice actor, presenter and director. He is known mainly for appearing in popular sitcom series.

== Early life and career ==
Razavian was born in the city of Qom to father from Yazd and a mother from Qom. He accidentally entered the field of acting. Razavian was classmate with Mehran Ghafourian, Amir Ghafarmanesh and Bijan Banafshekhah in his first year of university, and with their help, he entered this field. Razavian has been working as an actor since 1994. He came to television with Laughter Apple, but he became successful with the series On Tiptoes directed by Mehran Modiri and repeated this success with Grand Prize. His performance in the series In Controversy and In Controversy 2 directed by Modiri has made Razavian more popular than ever. Razavian has also directed series, including Zero Twenty-One, but he couldn't replicate this successes that he had achieved in the field of acting. He has acted in several TeleFilms and has released a few albums, with his latest work titled Quilting. He has a daughter named Yamin Razavian.

Razavian, on March 19, 2016, after being announced as one of the top three actors of the TV program Three Stars, tearfully declared that he would no longer work on television and bid farewell forever. But after a while, he returned to television and played roles in the series Neighbors and Zero Twenty-One.

== Filmography ==
- Harf too harf
- Sib-e Khandeh
- Sefr Darejeh
- Pavarchin (2002, TV series)
- Baghcheye Minoo (2003, TV series)
- Jayezeye Bozorg (2004, TV series)
- Sharlatan (2004, feature film)
- Farar-e Bozorg
- Erse Babam (2005, TV series, also director)
- Shakhe goli baraye aroos (2005, feature film)
- Kolahi Baraye Baran (2006, film)
- Char Khooneh (2007, TV series)
- Dah Raghami (2008, Feature Film)
- Gharargahe Maskooni (2008, TV series)
- Deldadeh (2008, feature film)
- Gharargah e Maskooni, TV series, also director)
- Ekhrajiha 2 (2009, film)
- Charchanguli (2009, film)
- Be Rooh Pedaram (2010, film)
- Limoo Torsh (2010, film)
- I'm just kidding (2014, TV series)
