= Dorehami =

- Also known as: Gathering; Meeting
- Genre: Comedy; Talk show Stand-up Comedian; Theater
- Based on: 1234
- Directed by: 1-12 Ep Mehrab Ghasem Khani; 12-present Ep Mehran Modiri
- Presented by: Mehran Modiri
- Starring: Siamak Ansari; Soroush Jamshidi
- Ending theme: "Dorehami" by Mehran Modiri
- Country of origin: Iran
- Original language: Persian
- No. of seasons: 4
- No. of episodes: 201

Production
- Producer: Mostafa Ahmadi
- Running time: 90 min
- Production company: AvvalMarke

Original release
- Network: IRIB Nasim
- Release: 18 March 2016 – 21 June 2021

Dorehami or Dowrehami (Persian: دورهمی, lit. '(Friendly) Get-together') is an Iranian Telecast currently directed by Mehran Modiri. It aired on cable network IRIB Nasim on Thursdays at 21:00 and Fridays and Saturdays at 23:00 (IST) from March 18 to October 1, 2016 and continue from November 4. The show's first season finale aired on April 6, 2018, featuring Adel Ferdosipour as the guest.

== Cast and characters ==
=== The first story ===
- Siamak Ansari as Peyman
- Shaghayegh Dehghan as Mehrnaz
- Elika Abdolrazzaghi as Homa
- Mohammad Naderi as Capitan
- Amir Mahdi Jule as Nader
- Mehran Ranjbar as Sepehr

=== The second story ===
- Siamak Ansari as Arsalan
- Mohammad Naderi as Janiyar "Johnny"
- Elika Abdolrazzaghi as Leyayul
- Ramin Nasernasir as Changiz Khan
- Leyla Irani as Darya
- Mehran Ranjbar as YoYo
- Amir Janani as LaLa
- Soroush Jamshidi as Gheymat

=== The third story ===
- Siamak Ansari as Arsalan
- Soroush Jamshidi as Gheymat
- Mahlagha Bagheri as Alieh "Annie"

=== The fourth story ===
- Soroush Jamshidi as Gheymat
- Sahar Valadbeigi as Shamsee (later left the show)

== Episodes ==
=== 2016 ===
List of episodes in 2016 (episode 1-30)

Episode #	Original airdate	Guest(s)
1	March 18, 2016	Borzou Arjomand and his mother
2	March 19, 2016	Majid Mozaffari (Part Deleted)
3	March 20, 2016 (Special Episode)	Mehraveh Sharifinia, Ali Parvin, Shabnam Moghaddami, Ali ZandeVakili
4	March 26, 2016	Reza Yazdani, Hojjat Hassanpour Sargaroui
5	March 27, 2016	Soroush Sehhat
6	April 1, 2016	Firouz Karimi, Amiril Arjomand and his wife, Nima Fallah, Sahar Valadbeigi
7	April 2, 2016	Amir Aghaei and his sister
8	April 8, 2016	Fuad and Siavash Saffarian
9	April 9, 2016	Jamshid Mashayekhi
10	April 15, 2016	Behnam Safavi
11	April 16, 2016	Kamran Tafti
12	April 21, 2016	Branko Ivankovic and his translator
13	April 23, 2016	Amin Hayaee, Khashayer Etemadi, Omid Rohani
14	April 29, 2016	Vahid TalebLou and his father
15	April 30, 2016	Kamand AmirSoleimani, Parviz Kardavani and his wife (Farideh Golbou)
16	May 5, 2016	Alireza Khamseh, Rouzbeh Nematollahi, Hossein Erfani and his daughter
17	May 6, 2016	Naser MehdiZadeh and his wife, Azar AbolFathi
18	May 7, 2016	Mohammad Mayeli Kohan, Amin Zendegani
19	May 12, 2016	Mehdi Yarahi, AmirMehdi Zouleh
20	May 13, 2016	Parviz Bahram
21	May 14, 2016	Hassan AghaJani
22	May 19, 2016	Bahram Zand
23	May 20, 2016	Aref Lorestani, Alireza Heydari
24	May 21, 2016	Kourosh Tahami, Omid and Amir Tajik, Hamid Estili
25	May 26, 2016	Zohreh Shokoufandeh
26	May 27, 2016	Hojjat AshrafZadeh, Houman BarghNavard
27	May 28, 2016	Shila Khodadad, HesamEdin Seraj
28	June 4, 2016	Laleh Eskandari, Vahid Shamsaee
29	June 9, 2016	Behnoosh Bakhtiari, Ali Tafreshi, Alireza Rezaee
30	June 10, 2016	Zahra Nemati, Elham PavehNejad

== Awards and nominations ==
Year	Award	Category	Recipient	Result
2016	16th Hafez Awards	Best TV Presenter	Mehran Modiri	Won
2017	3rd 3Stars	Best Entertainment TV Program	Dorehami	Won
2017	3rd 3Stars	Best TV Presenter	Mehran Modiri	Won
2017	17th Hafez Awards	Best TV Presenter	Mehran Modiri	Won
