= Mohammad Naderi (actor) =

Iranian actor

- محمد نادری
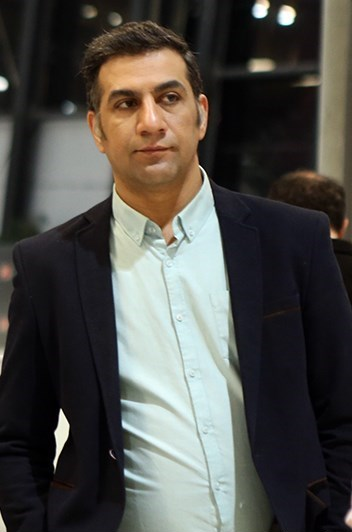
- Naderi at the 36th International Fajr Film Festival
- Born: 1 July 1978 (age 47); Tehran, Iran
- Occupations: Actor, director, writer, voice actor
- Height: 1.93 m (6 ft 4 in)

Mohammad Naderi (Persian: محمد نادری; born 1978) is an Iranian actor, director, writer and voice actor. He is known for his roles in Dorehami and Shamdooni. He created the doll of Jenab Khan.

== Series and Movies ==
- The Enigma of the Shah, 2015
- Dorehami, 2016
- Shamduni, 2014
- Khandevane, 2017–2019
- Hezarpa, 2017
- Pastarioni, 2018
- Dang o fange roozegar, 2018–2019
- You Only Go Around Once, 2023

== Series (As a writer and Voice actor) ==
- Morvarid Alley, 2013–2014 (writer & voice actor)
