= Bijan Banafshekhah =

Iranian actor (born 1973)

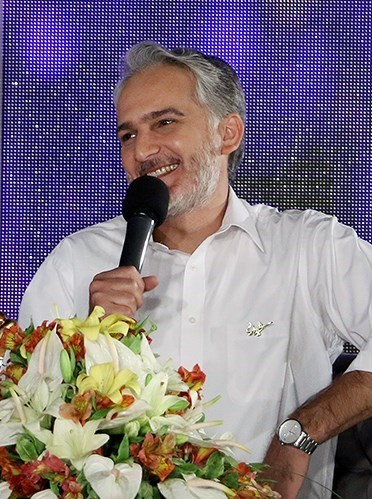
- Banafashekhah in August 2016
- Born: 29 March 1973 (age 53); Darvazeh Shamiran, Tehran, Imperial State of Iran
- Occupation: Actor
- Years active: 1993–present
- Children: 2
- Father: Reza Banafshekhah
- Relatives: Mahmoud Banafshekhah (Uncle)

Bijan Banafshekhah (Persian: بیژن بنفشه‌خواه; born 29 March 1973) is an Iranian actor. He is best known for his collaborations with Iranian director Soroush Sehhat in Doctors' Building (2011), Pejman (2013), Bachelors (2016–2019), You Only Go Around Once (2023), and Breakfast with Giraffes (2024).

== Early life ==
Bijan Banafshekhah was born into an artistic family. His father and uncle are prominent and old Iranian actors. He started acting when he was a teenager and since then he has become one of the most popular comedians and actors in Iran.

== Career ==
"Joker" is a reality show directed by Ehsan Alikhani and Seyed Hamed Mirfatahi, where celebrities compete to make each other laugh without laughing themselves. Bijan Banafshekhah was a participant in the first season, alongside famous actors like Amin Hayai and Sam Derakhshani. Although he performed well, Banafshekhah was the first to be eliminated. He later returned in the final season to compete with previous finalists.

=== Pezhman ===
"Pezhman" is a comedy series directed by Soroush Sehat, revolving around Pezhman Jamshidi, a former football player struggling with life after his sports career. Bijan Banafshekhah portrayed Bahram, the son-in-law of the family, who is portrayed as obedient to his socially active wife, played by Bahareh Rahnama.

=== Doctors' Building ===
In this popular series, also directed by Soroush Sehat, Bijan Banafshekhah played Dr. Hooman Malekzadeh, a plastic surgeon and close friend of the lead character, Dr. Nima Afshar. The show portrays Afshar’s struggles as a psychologist and the challenges he faces in his professional and personal life.

=== The Graduates ===
Banafshekhah also appeared in the series "The Graduates," which depicts the lives of three university graduates, each dealing with their own issues. He played the father-in-law of one of the main characters, portraying a man who has frequent conflicts with his son-in-law.

=== Spouses' Club ===
In the 2018 comedy film "Spouses' Club," directed by Mehdi Sabbaghzadeh, Banafshekhah stars alongside actors such as Shaghayegh Farahani and Mohammad Reza Sharifinia. The film tells the story of three men who flee to Kish Island to escape their wives, hatching a plan to fake their own kidnappings. Banafshekhah plays Ahmad, one of the husbands involved in the scheme.

== Filmography ==
=== Film ===
Year	Title	Role	Director	Notes	Ref(s)
2021	Punch Drunk	Sohrabi	Adel Tabrizi		
2022	Bonded Parents		Hossein Ghena'at		
2022	Bank Robbers		Javad Ardakani		
2023	Coconut 2	Mahyar	Davoud Atyabi		
2024	Parvin		Mohammad Reza Vaziri		
2024	Breakfast with Giraffes	Shahin	Soroush Sehhat		
2025	Antique		Hadi Naiji		

=== Web ===
Year	Title	Role	Director	Platform	Ref(s)
2020	Mafia Nights	Himself	Saeed Aboutaleb	Filimo	
2021–2022	Joker	Himself	Ehsan Alikhani	Filimo	
2023	Godfather	Himself	Saeed Aboutaleb	Filmnet	
2023	TNT	Himself	Hamed Ahangi	Filimo	
2023	You Only Go Around Once	Neo	Soroush Sehhat	Filimo, Namava	
2023	Naato	Himself	Mehdi Safiyari	Filmnet	
2023	Party	Himself	Iraj Tahmasb	Filimo, Namava	
2023–2024	The Notebook	Naser	Kiarash Asadizadeh	Filmnet	
2023–2024	Blue Nissan	Reza Sousan	Masoud Atyabi	Filimo	

=== Television ===
- 2023: Noon Khe
- 2020: The Event
- 2018: Orange Spring as Guest
- 2016: Bachelors
- 2014: I'm Just Kidding
- 2012: Pejman
- 2011: Doctors' Building
- 2010: Bitter Coffee
- 2002: Without Description
- 2002: Under the City's Skin
