= Saeid Pirdoost =

Iranian actor (1941–2026)

- سعید پیردوست
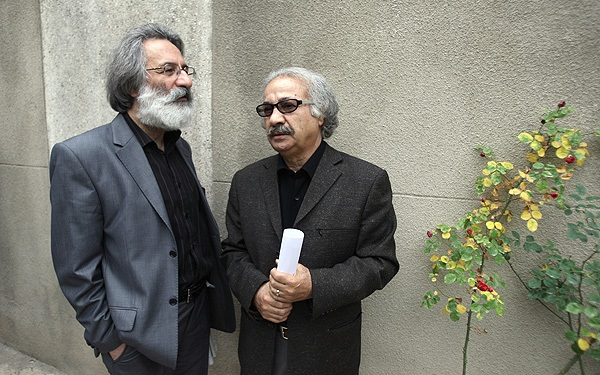
- Pirdoost (right)
- Born: 6 January 1941; Tehran, Imperial State of Iran
- Died: 6 January 2026 (aged 85)
- Occupation: Actor
- Years active: 1973–2025

Saeid Pirdoost (Persian: سعید پیردوست; 6 January 1941 – 6 January 2026) was an Iranian actor. He died on 6 January 2026, at the age of 85. Pirdoost had been battling cancer for several years.

== Filmography ==
- Gavazn-ha (The Deer)
- Snake Fang
- Dast-haye Aloode
- Delbar-e Ahani
- Karagah Alavi (Detective Alavi)
- Dokhtar-e shirini forush (The Confectioner Girl)
- Tokyo bedoone tavaghof (Tokyo none-stop)
- Pavarchin'' (On Tiptoe)
- Noghtechin (Dotting)
- Checkmate
- Son of Adam, Daughter of Eve
- Oxygen
- Jayezeye Bozorg (Grand Prize)
- Shabhaye Barareh (Barareh Nights)
- Baghe Mozaffar (Mozaffar's Garden)
- Marde Hezar Chehreh (Thousand-Face Man)
- Ghahve-ye Talkh (Bitter Coffee)
- Killing a Traitor
