= Shabnam Farshadjoo =

Iranian actress

- شبنم فرشادجو
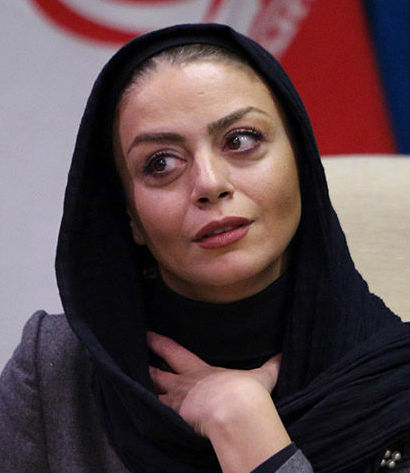
- Born: 1978 (age 47–48); Tehran, Iran
- Other names: Shabnam Farshad-Jo, Shabnam Farshadjo
- Occupation: Actress
- Years active: 1999–2022

Shabnam Farshadjoo (Persian: شبنم فرشادجو; born January 1978) is an Iranian actress of stage, film, and television.

== Biography ==
Shabnam Farshadjoo was born in January 1978 in Tehran, Iran. She has a master's degree in performing arts. She began her film acting career in 1999 in the film Rain Man (2000) by director Abolhassan Davoudi.

In September 2022, she removed her hijab in support of the Mahsa Amini protests. She retired from the world of acting by announcing it in a post on Instagram two days after the removal of the hijab incident, while she was reportedly visiting Canada. One Iranian news source reported this action was done by Farshadjoo in order to gain asylum.

== Filmography ==
=== Television series ===
- I'm Just Kidding (2014) (Persian: شوخی کردم)
- Lady of the Mansion (2018–2019) (Persian: بانوی عمارت, romanized: Banou-yeh Emarat)

=== Films ===
- Rain Man (2000 film) (2000) (Persian: مرد بارانی, romanized: Mard-e barani)
- The Operation of Kindergarten (2012) (Persian: عمليات مهد كودك, romanized: Amaliyate Mahde Koodak)
- When Did You See Sahar Last Time? (2016) (Persian: آخرين بار كي سحر را ديدي؟, romanized: Akharin Bar Key Sahar Ra Didi)
