= Doctors' Building (TV series) =

- Also known as: Sakhteman Pezeshkan
- ساختمان پزشکان
- Genre: Comedy
- Written by: Peyman GhasemKhani; Mehrab GhasemKhani; Alireza Nazerfasihi and Soroush Sehhat
- Directed by: Soroush Sehhat
- Starring: Behnam Tashakkor; Hooman Barghnavard; Hushang Harirchiyan; Farnaz Rahnama; Shaghayegh Dehghan; Bijan Banafshekhah; Parvin Ghaem Maghami; Mehran Rajabi; Omid Rohani; Naeimeh Nezamdoost; Sepand Amirsoleimani; Mona Farjad; Pejman Jamshidi
- Theme music composer: Sirvan Khosravi
- Composer: Sirvan Khosravi
- Country of origin: Iran
- Original language: Persian
- No. of seasons: 1
- No. of episodes: 57

Production
- Producer: Mohsen Chegini
- Production location: Tehran
- Cinematography: Zein aldin Allameh
- Running time: 45 - 60 minutes

Original release
- Release: 20 May – 26 July 2011

Doctors' Building (Persian: ساختمان پزشکان; Sakhteman Pezeshkan) is an Iranian drama and comedy series directed by Soroush Sehhat.

== Storyline ==
Nima Afshar (Behnam Tashakkor) is a psychologist living with his wife, Nazanin (Farnaz Rahnama), also his former patient. They live in the same building as Nima's parents. The series explores the various inconveniences in Nima's life. His challenges include problems with various patients and financial problems arising from paying rent, various installments, his ex-wife's (Mona Farjad) Mahr, his constant efforts to maintain peace and tranquility between his parents (Hushang Harirchiyan) and his careless brother (Hooman Barghnavard), his obsessive wife, and finally his secretary's (Shaghayegh Dehghan) intolerance.

== Cast ==
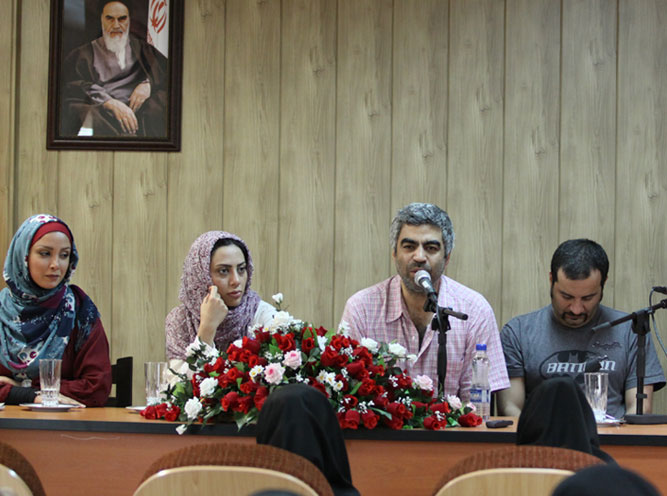
Soroush Sehhat, Farnaz Rahnama, Mona Farjad, and Mehrab Qasemkhani in the Doctors' Building serial press conference

- Behnam Tashakkor as Dr. Nima Afshar
- Hooman Barghnavard as Nasser Afshar, brother of Nima
- Hushang Harirchiyan as Farid Afshar, father of Nima and Naser
- Farnaz Rahnama as Nazanin Farahmand, wife of Nima
- Shaghayegh Dehghan as Parastoo Shirzad, office secretary
- Bijan Banafshekhah as Hooman Malekzadeh, co-worker of Nima
- Parvin Ghaem Maghami as Mahbobeh jamaly, mother of Nima and Naser
- Mehran Rajabias Gym license issuer
- Omid Rohani as Dr. Amir-Mansour Sohrabi, the building manager
- Naeimeh Nezamdoost as Nahal Kamali, wife of Dr. Sohrabi
- Sepand Amirsoleimani as Kiasty
- Mona Farjadas Dr. Katayon Borhannejad, Ex-Wife of Nima
- Mohammad Shiri as Colonel Mohammadi
- Pejman Jamshidi as himself
- Rambod Javan as Mehrzad
- Menocher Alipur as uncle
- Hadis Mir Amini as Houri
- Sirous Ebrahim Zadeh as Dr. Sirius Farzaneh
- Gholamhussein Lotfi as Nima family
- Amir Baradaran-tajek
- Ali Barghy-خیری
- Sanaz Zarrinmehr
- Marjan Sepehri - Nazafarin mahbob
- Majid Shahryari - majid jozini
- Mahdy Mohammad zade-Hamed sharefy
- Rza karemy- kasra Kamalimotlagh
- Mahiar shapory-Omid
- Hasan nory
- Zohre fode
