= The Monster (TV series) =

Iranian comedy series

- Genre: Political satire
- Written by: Amir Baradaran Screenwriter and screenwriter: Peyman GhasemKhani
- Directed by: Mehran Modiri
- Starring: Farhad Aslani Shabnam Moghaddami Mehran Modiri Gohar Kheirandish Shila Khodadad Mohammad Bahrani Sima Tirandaz
- Composer: Amir Tavassoli
- Country of origin: Iran
- Original language: Persian

Production
- Producer: Mustafa Ahmadi Mehran Modiri
- Running time: 50 minutes

Original release
- Network: Home video
- Release: May 13 – September 16, 2019

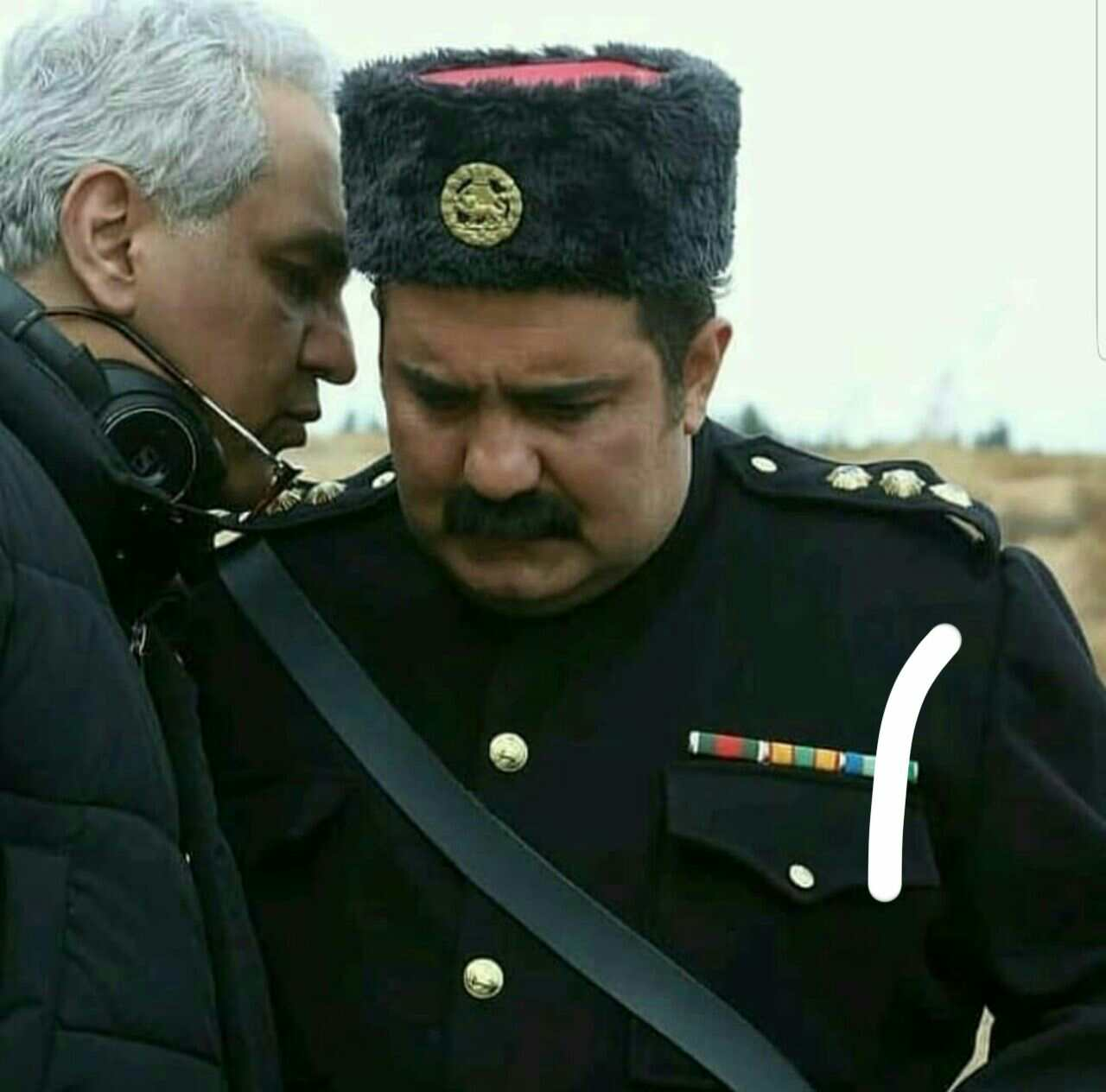
Mirtaher Mazloumi and Mehran Modiri in behind the scene of series

The Monster (Persian: هیولا, romanized: Hayoula, also Hayoola) is an Iranian TV series in the genre of political satire, directed by Mehran Modiri, produced by Seyed Mostafa Ahmadi and Mehran Modiri and written by Amir Baradaran. The designer and director of the script of the series is Peyman Ghasemkhani. This is the seventh series between Modiri and Ghasemkhani and it is also the first series of this director in which Siamak Ansari is not present. The filming of the first season started in December 2016 and lasted until May 2017. Due to the fact that the series took place in different places, the location of the filming was not fixed. The first season of the series started broadcasting on May 30, 2019, and ended on September 16, 2019. The second season is also in production. The first season of the series aired on a weekly basis on Mondays.

== Storyline ==
Houshang is a simple and honorable teacher who is satisfied with his life and has little regard for the world, but inadvertently finds himself on a path that changes his life and enters the process of embezzlement and corruption. He is unexpectedly inflated with wealth and distances himself from his former character. The story is narrated in several periods from Qajar to the present day.

== Cast ==
Cat and Characters in The Monster season 1
Character	Actor	Seasons
Character	Actor	1
Main Characters
Houshang Sherafat	Farhad Aslani	Main
Kamran Kamrava	Mehran Modiri	Main
Shohreh	Shabnam Moghaddami	Main
Mehri	Gohar Kheirandish	Main
Ghazanfar Chemchareh/Mahyar Mehrafzoon	Mohammad Bahrani	Main
Mina	Sima Tirandaz	Main
Houshmand Kamrava	Nima Shabannejad	Main
Haleh Sherafat	Mania Alijani	Main
Hamed Sherafat	Mohammad Javad Jafarpour	Main
Felor	Shila Khodadad	Main
Recurring and Guest characters
Mehdigholi Khan Sherafat	Mirtaher Mazloumi	Guest
Mahmoud Sherafat	Changiz Jalilvand	Guest
Fazid	Afshin Zinoori	Recurring
Davood Bizakodil/Shervin	Shakib Shajareh	Recurring
Zhila Zahmatkesh	Aziat Terkashound	Recurring
Majd	Ezzatolah Mehravaran	Recurring
Mohsen Saeedi	Reza Karimi	Recurring
Arzhang Noordideh	Farzin Mohades	Recurring
Pouladtan	Mohsen Ghazimoradi	Recurring
Beggar	Isa Yousefipour	
Melika	Ladan Soleimani	Recurring
Bita	Nooshin Tabrizi	Recurring
Miss.Elham	Elsa Firoozazar	Recurring
Mr.Mansour	Peyaman Fatemi	Recurring
Mahsa	Deniz Motavassel	Recurring
Kamali	Payam Ahmadinia	Recurring
Zhabiz	Amir Teymouri	Recurring
Tishani	Alireza Aghakhani	Recurring
Ardalan	Siamak Ehsaee	Recurring
Mansour Moddaber	Manoochehr Azar	Guest

= Main

= Recurring (+4)

= Guest (3-1)

== Awards ==
Year	Award	Category	Nominations	Result
2020	Hafez Awards			
2020	Hafez Awards	The best television series	Mehran Modiri and Mustafa Ahmadi	Won
2020	Hafez Awards	Best director	Mehran Modiri	Won
2020	Hafez Awards	The best comedian Actress	Shila Khodadad	Nominated
2020	Hafez Awards	The best comedian Actress	Gohar Kheirandish	Nominated
2020	Hafez Awards	The best comedian Actress	Shabnam Moghaddami	Won
2020	Hafez Awards	The best TV script	Peyman GhasemKhani	Won
2020	Hafez Awards	The best comedian Actor	Mehran Modiri	Nominated
2020	Hafez Awards	The best comedian Actor	Farhad Aslani	Nominated
2020	Hafez Awards	The best comedian Actor	Shakib Shajareh	Nominated
