= Sepand Amirsoleimani =

Iranian actor

- سپند امیرسلیمانی
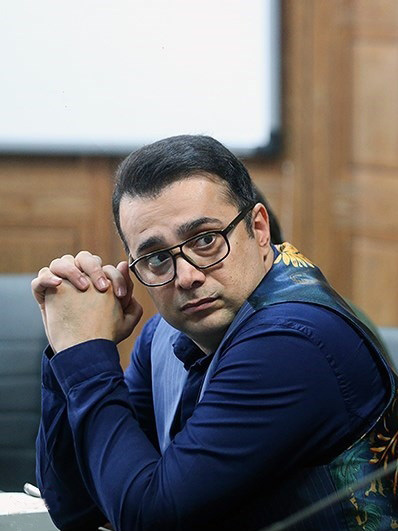
- Born: 19 December 1977 (age 48); Tehran, Imperial State of Iran
- Occupation: Actor
- Years active: 1982–present
- Relatives: Kamand Amirsoleimani (sister)

Sepand Amirsoleimani (Persian: سپند امیرسلیمانی, born 19 December 1977) is an Iranian actor from Tehran.

== Biography ==
Sepand Amirsoleimani started acting at the age of 5 and has acted mostly in comedy films and series. He believes that acting does not provide financial security, and that's why he was a manager in a Food court for a while in addition to his main profession.

He was infected with COVID-19 in June 2021 and had to undergo several surgeries. His father Saeed Amirsoleimani and his sister Kamand Amirsoleimani are prominent Iranian actors.

== Selected filmography ==
- 2022: Joker (series)
- 2022: Killing a Traitor
- 2020: Mafia Nights (TV series)
- 2019: Salman the Persian (TV series)
- 2019: Zendeh Rood (TV series) as Guest
- 2016: The Enigma of the Shah (TV series)
- 2015: Sperm Whale
- 2014: I'm just kidding (TV series)
- 2011: Doctors' Building (TV series)
- 2011: Ekhrajiha 3
- 2010: Bitter Coffee (TV series)
- 2010: Foggy Tabriz (TV series)
- 2009: Man of Many Many Faces (TV series)
- 2009: Ekhrajiha 2
- 2007: Ekhrajiha
- 2006: Nargess (TV series)
- 2005: Barareh Nights (TV series)
- 2002: On Tiptoes (TV series)
- 2002: Bread, love and 1000 motorcycle
- 1991: Like a Cloud in the Springtime
