= 5 in the Afternoon =

2017 Iranian film by Mehran Modiri

ساعت پنج عصر
- Persian: ساعت ۵ عصر
- Directed by: Mehran Modiri
- Written by: Mehran Modiri
- Produced by: Mehran Modiri
- Starring: Siamak Ansari; Amir Jafari; Azadeh Samadi; Rasoul Najafian; Mehran Modiri
- Cinematography: Mahmoud Kalari
- Release date: 21 July 2017
- Running time: 95 min
- Country: Iran
- Language: Persian
- Box office: $2,261,000

5 in the Afternoon (Persian: ساعت ۵ عصر) is an Iranian movie, directed by Mehran Modiri. This movie sold more than $175,000 on the first day, which was a record for Iranian movies.

== Plot ==
Mehrdad Parham is a lawyer who lives alone in the north of Tehran. He has to go to the bank branch at 5 o'clock to pay the bank installment to save his house from being confiscated by the bank but...

== Cast ==
- Siamak Ansari
- Amir Jafari
- Azadeh Samadi
- Rasoul Najafian
- Mehran Modiri
