= Killing a Traitor =

- Film poster
- Persian: خائن‌کشی
- Directed by: Masoud Kimiai
- Written by: Masoud Kimiai
- Produced by: Ali Oji
- Starring: Amir Aghaei; Mehran Modiri; Poulad Kimiayi; Sara Bahrami; Hamid Reza Azarang; Reza Yazdani; Pantea Bahram
- Cinematography: Masoud Salami
- Music by: Sattar Oraki
- Release date: 1 February 2022 (FIFF)
- Country: Iran
- Language: Persian

Killing a Traitor (Persian: خائن‌کشی) is a 2022 Iranian drama film written and directed by Masoud Kimiai. The film screened for the first time at the 40th Fajr Film Festival where it won an award and earned 5 nominations.

== Plot ==
A group wants to steal from the National Bank of Iran. Mehdi, Shahrokh, Gio, Atlas and others are the apparent thieves of the bank. But they want this money for Dr. Mossadegh's national loan. Dr. Mossadegh insists that Iranian oil must be nationalized. On the other hand, the leader of this group is in love with a woman, but in the clashes that he has with the police in front of the bank, he is shot and the rest of the people run away and…

== Cast ==
- Amir Aghaei
- Mehran Modiri
- Poulad Kimiayi
- Mani Heidari
- Sam Derakhshani
- Saeid Pirdoost
- Sara Bahrami
- Hamid Reza Azarang
- Farhad Aeesh
- Reza Yazdani
- Pantea Bahram
- Andisheh Fouladvand
- Nader Fallah
- Narges Mohammadi
- Fariba Naderi
- Amir Reza Delavari
- Elham Hamidi
- Pardis Pourabedini
- Sepand Amirsoleimani
- Nasim Adabi
- Saman Salur
- Kianoosh Gerami
- Ayoub Aghakhani
- Iliya Keyvan
- Shapoor Kalhor

== Production ==
The film is a story of camaraderie and democracy. It depicts the life of Mehdi Baligh, an Iranian thief and swindler. Filming took place in February 2021 in Tehran.

== Reception ==
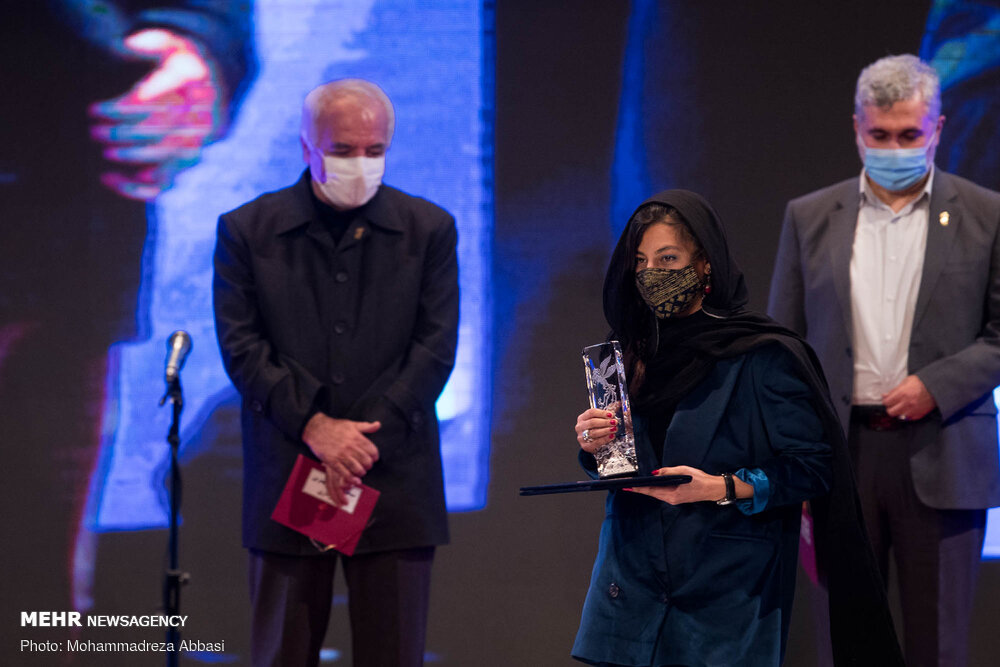
Maral Jeyrani received critical acclaim for her work and earned her the Crystal Simorgh for Best Costume Design.

=== Accolades ===
Year	Award	Category	Recipient	Result	Ref.
2022	Fajr Film Festival	Best Visual Effects	Mohammad Baradaran	Nominated	
2022	Fajr Film Festival	Best Special Effects	Arash Aghabeig	Nominated	
2022	Fajr Film Festival	Best Production Design	Soheil Danesh Eshraghi	Nominated	
2022	Fajr Film Festival	Best Costume Design	Maral Jeyrani	Won	
2022	Fajr Film Festival	Best Sound Effects	Amir Hossein Ghasemi	Nominated	
2022	Fajr Film Festival	Best Editor	Sepideh Abdel Wahab	Nominated	
