= Pejman (TV series) =

Television series

- Persian: پژمان
- Genre: Drama; Comedy
- Written by: Peyman GhasemKhani; Mehrab GhasemKhani and Soroush Sehhat
- Directed by: Soroush Sehhat
- Starring: Pejman Jamshidi; Sam Derakhshani; Hushang Harirchiyan; Bahareh Rahnama; Shaghayegh Dehghan; Bijan Banafshekhah; Farhad Aeesh; Hooman Barghnavard; Vida Javan; Rambod Javan; Gholamhussein Lotfi; Behnam Tashakkor; Peyman GhasemKhani
- Theme music composer: Ali Zand Vakili
- Country of origin: Iran
- Original language: Persian
- No. of seasons: 1
- No. of episodes: 26

Production
- Producer: Mohsen Chegini
- Production location: Tehran
- Cinematography: Hassan Aslani
- Editor: Shahram Keyvar
- Running time: 45 minutes

Original release
- Release: 26 September 2012 – 4 January 2013

Pejman (Persian: پژمان) is an Iranian drama and comedy series directed by Soroush Sehhat.

== Storyline ==
Pejman Jamshidi, a former member of the Iran national football team, plays a former star of Tehran-based football club Persepolis. He has not been able to find a team for the fourth consecutive season despite much effort. Nevertheless, Pejman is still in the mood for fame. He is looking for a team with his program manager Vahid (Sam Derakhshani). In the process, interesting things happen to him and his program manager.

== Cast ==
- Pejman Jamshidi
- Sam Derakhshani
- Hushang Harirchiyan
- Bahareh Rahnama
- Shaghayegh Dehghan
- Bijan Banafshekhah
- Farhad Aeesh
- Hooman Barghnavard
- Vida Javan
- Rambod Javan
- Gholamhussein Lotfi
- Behnam Tashakkor
- Peyman GhasemKhani
- Farkhondeh Farmanizadeh
- Ardeshir Kazemi
- Amir Hossein Rostami
- Parvin Meykadeh
- Ali Oji
- Ashkan Khatibi
- Gelareh Darbandi
- Hamid Derakhshan, Behrouz Rahbarifar, Ali Mousavi, Mohammad Mohammadi, Arash Borhani, Hossein Mahini and Khosro Heydari are among the football players who have played their roles in this TV series.
