= Aspirin (TV series) =

Iranian television series

- Also known as: آسپرین
- Country of origin: Iran
- Original language: Persian

Production
- Production company: Real Move Entertainment

Original release
- Release: 10 September 2015

Aspirin (Persian: آسپرین) is a Persian-language TV series produced, directed, and written by Farhad Najafi. The series was produced in Iran by Real Move Entertainment, and premiered on 10 September 2015.

The story is a drama about a doctor who performs a strange experiment on one of his male patients.

The show is 50 minutes long. Season one has 17 episodes.
