= The Dots (TV series) =

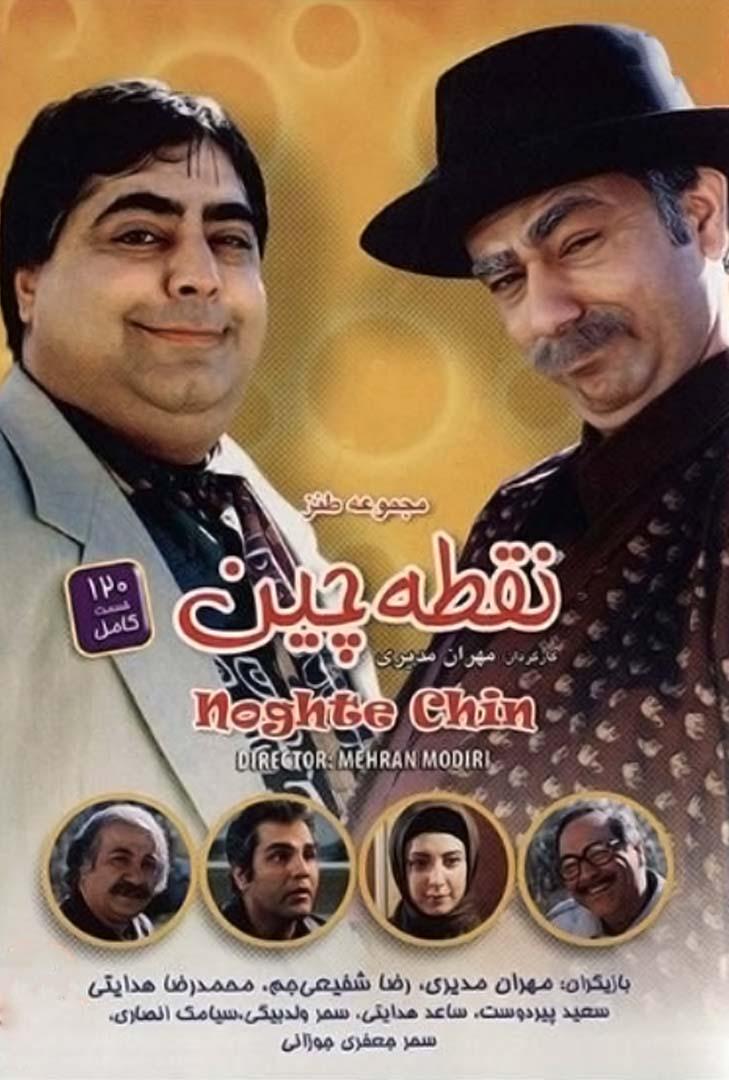
- Also known as: Noghtechin
- Genre: Comedy
- Written by: Peyman Qasemkhani; Amir Mahdi Jule; Bahman Motamedian
- Directed by: Mehran Modiri
- Starring: Mehran Modiri; Reza Shafiei Jam; Mohammad Reza Hedayati; Saeid Pirdoost; Siamak Ansari; Sahar Valadbeigi; Sahar Jafari Jozani
- Country of origin: Iran
- Original language: Persian
- No. of episodes: 135 Episodes

Production
- Producers: Hamid Aghagolian; Majid Aghagolian
- Production locations: Tehran, Iran
- Editor: Javad Aslani
- Running time: 90 minutes

Original release
- Network: IRIB TV3
- Release: 1 September 2003 – 15 January 2004

Related
- On Tiptoes

The Dots (Persian: نقطه‌چین) is an Iranian television sitcom. It was broadcast for the first time by the IRIB in 2003. It was directed by Mehran Modiri, the creator of Pavarchin and Shabhaye Barareh. The show was famous for Bamshad and his song "Bi-vafa-ie." It is also noted that The Dots holds the distinction of receiving the most money from advertising of any Iranian show, thanks largely to constant sponsorship by Samsung, which is featured prominently in Mr. Pirdoost's store. Many of the actors in The Dots are reused in other Modiri productions.

== Plot ==
The plot centered around Ardal Pashandi (Mehran Modiri), Bamshad Pahnfar (Reza Shafiei-Jam), and their wives, Manizhe and Mozhdeh Jaberi (Sahar Valadbeigi). Ardal and Bamshad often got themselves in sticky situations that they tried to hide from their wives, but they were always found out by the end of each episode. The show began with Ardal as a bachelor living with his aged father (Yoosef Pashandi) in an apartment building owned by Mr. Pirdoost (Saeid Pirdoost) who lived with his bachelor son Kourosh (Siamak Ansari). Bamshad Pahnfar and Mozhdeh Jaberi were a young married couple living in the building that often interfered in Ardal's business. Ardal later meets and falls in love with Mozhdeh's sister, Manizh Jaberi (Sahar Jafari Jozani) and they get married and live in Ardal's apartment with his father. Manizh is a dentist and has a practice inside her home. Bamshad and Ardal later go work for Daddy Jaberi (Mohammad-Reza Hedayati), their father-in-law, at his company Manchoolbaf. The show was similar to The Honeymooners in that it featured two married couples and the funny situations the husbands would get themselves into, as well as having a lovable overweight character. The final episode featured a crossover cameo by the cast of Pavarchin.

== Cast ==
- Mehran Modiri as Ardalan Pashandi, Farhad Barareh and Farhad's Father Shir Farhad Barareh
- Reza Shafiei Jam as Bamshad
- Siamak Ansari as Kourosh Pirdoost
- Mohammad Reza Hedayati as Daddy
- Sahar Valadbeigi as Mozhdeh
- Sahar Jafari Jozani as Manijeh
- Saeid Pirdoost as Pirdoost
- Saed Hedayati as Saed
- Yousef Pashandi as Pashandi dad detective
- Sahar Darvish Zadeh as Sepideh
- Sanaz Samavati as Behnoosh
