= Barareh Nights =

Iranian TV series

- Also known as: Shabhaye Barareh
- Genre: Comedy
- Written by: Peyman Ghasem Khani - amir mahdi jule - Bahman Motamedian
- Directed by: Mehran Modiri
- Starring: Mehran Modiri; Siamak Ansari; Reza Shafiei Jam; Saeid Pirdoost; Mohammad Shiri; Falamak Joneidi; Fatemeh Hashemi; Hadi Kazemi; Behnoosh Bakhtiari; Shaghayegh Dehghan; Mohammad Reza Hedayati; Saed Hedayati; Mokhtar Saeghi; Vahid Mahin Doost; Ali Kazemi; Asghar Heidari; Shaian Ahadifar; Hasan Shokuhi; Sepand Amirsoleimani
- Country of origin: Iran
- Original language: Persian
- No. of episodes: 92 episodes

Production
- Producers: Majid Aghagolian; Hamid Aghagolian
- Production locations: Tehran, Iran
- Editor: Javad Aslani
- Running time: 90 minutes
- Production company: IRIB

Original release
- Network: IRIB TV3
- Release: 1 September – 1 December 2005

Related
- On Tiptoes

Barareh Nights (Persian: شب‌های برره) is a 2005 Iranian satire television series broadcast by the IRIB network. The series ended after 92 episodes; the storyline of Barareh Nights was not complete. It aired in Iran daily at 8:00 p.m. Tehran time on Channel 3. Rebroadcast outside of the country was daily on IRIB 1 and IRIB 2. The last show episode aired Thursday 1 December 2005. It was directed by Mehran Modiri.

Barareh Nights is the prequel to Mehran Modiri's 2002 serial, Pavarchin. Whilst not taking place in Barareh, Pavarchin introduced the oddities and strange behaviours of Barareans. The series also has many of the cast members from Modiri's earlier works such as Pavarchin, Noghtechin, and Jayezeye Bozorg.

== Plot outline ==
The show is set in the fictional village of Barareh in Iran of the 1930s, about a journalist in the name of kianoosh estegrar zade, during the reign of Reza Shah Pahlavi, whose picture can be seen on the set. The village people have their own Persian dialect which humorously modifies the language. In addition to this, the Barareans also have certain customs and rituals which at times are comical, such as their method of eating chick peas—by slapping individual peas from palm into mouth. The village of Barareh is believed by many be a microcosm of Iran. The town is split along the lines of Upper and Lower Barareh, which allegedly mimics the difference between the classes in modern-day Iran. Events in the village, such as football ("darbid") matches, village council elections and marriage closely mirror today's Iran.

The show stars Mehran Modiri, as Shir Farhad, the son of Lower Barareh's khan, or leader. He lives with his sister, Saharnaz(Shaghayegh Dehghan); mother, Shadoneh(Falamak Joneidi); and father, Salar Khan. The show begins when a journalist, Kiyanoosh(Siamak Ansari), from Tehran is arrested for writing an article criticizing the government, escapes capture, and then is bitten by a snake. Shir Farhad finds him collapsed and brings him to the village of Barareh, nurtures him to health, and gradually introduces him to the town and the other characters in the show, such as the families of Upper and Lower Barareh's Khans, as well as the flamboyant village poet, Bagoori, and village doctor. Later in the series, new characters such as the village gendarme and Upper Barareh's Khan's son and daughter, Keivoon (Reza Shafiei Jam) and Leiloon (Behnoosh Bakhtiari), join the cast. Davooneh doesn't appear in this.

== Cast ==
Lower Barrareh

- Mehran Modiri - Shir Farhad Barareh (the Lower Barareh Khan's son, but later he becomes the son-in-law of the Khan of Upper Barareh).
- Siamak Ansari - Kiyanoosh Barareh (A journalist that is committed to jail because of political event, but he later becomes the husband of Saharnaz Barareh, which makes him the son-in-law of the Khan of Lower Barareh)
- Shaghayegh Dehghan - Saharnaz Barareh (the Lower Barareh Khan's daughter)
- Mohammad Shiri - Salar Khan Barareh (the Khan of Lower Barareh)
- Falamak Joneidi - Shadoneh Khanoum Barareh (the Lower Barareh Khan's wife)
- Hassan Shokohi - Babri Khan Barareh (Brother of Shadoneh)

Upper Barrareh

- Saeid Pirdoost - Sardar Khan Barareh (the Khan of Upper Barareh)
- Fatemeh Hashemi - Shakheh Shemshad Khanoum Barareh (the Upper Barareh Khan's wife)
- Behnoosh Bakhtiari - Leiloon Barareh (the Upper Barareh Khan's daughter)
- Reza Shafiei Jam - Keivoon Barareh (the Upper Barareh Khan's son)
- Saed Hedayati - Jan Nesar Barareh (the Upper Barareh Khan's quasi-servant, whose sole purpose is to compliment and cajole him)
- Hadi Kazemi - Nezam Do Barareh (Barareh's Gandarmerie assistant and the son of the khan of Bararieh)
- Hossein Rahmani Manesh

Other characters

- Mohammad-Reza Hedayati - Yavar Toghrol (Barareh's Gandarmerie)
- Mokhtar Saegi - Corporal (Corporal for the Gandarmerie of Barareh)
- Ali Kazemi - Bagoori (the poet of Barareh )
- Ali asghar Heidari karimzadeh - Dr. Jakool (Village doctor/barber/banker/dentist)
- Shayan Ahadifar - Village Jester

Imaginary characters

- Khorzookhan

== Running gags ==
"Barareh Nights" is full of gags, which make a huge contribution to language of people. Some of these gags are listed below:

- Give me money!: In the show Keyvoon is a thug, even though his parents thought he was a doctor. He often robs people by telling them: "Give me money!" (Persian: پول وَده), and when they reply: "Why?" He says: "Bullying money!" (Persian: پولِ زور وَده) Sometimes he says "Give me money" for no reason.
- Zorro: In one episode, Salar Khan turns out to be the Zorro of Barareh, a comic homage to the original Zorro. Because of his old age, he wants his son, Shir Farhad, to succeed him as the next Zorro. In a later episode, Shadoneh tells Shakhe Shemshad that her husband is Zorro, and Shakhe Shemshad replies: "No! My son, Keyvoon is Zorro!" Shadoneh replies: "But when Zorro came, Keyvoon was among the people, how can he be Zorro?" Shakhe Shemshad retorts: "Well, because he played in two roles, simultaneously."
- That's Different!: In Bararian language, there are four expressions to say: "That's Different!". While Persians say: "Fargh Mikone" as a synonym to "That's Different!", Bararians say:
  - "Fargh Makooleh" for large differences
  - "Fargh Fookooleh" for medium differences
  - "Fargh Fan Coil" for small differences
  - "Fargh Phil Collins" for extremely small differences

Fargh Makoolah was first said by Davood in Pavarchin.

- Khoob Biiid?: Was it gooood?; the poet Bagoori says this after every poem to make sure that people liked it.
- Jiiiiigar: This is Salar Khan's slogan, meaning sweetheart.
- Voooygoolanjz: Voooygoolanjz denotes the third person plural conjugate of any verb at present tense and past tense. In barareh language every verb gets a prefix of "va" added to the standard forms of the verb conjugates, but the third person plural of the form of the verb changes radically to vooygoolanjz regardless of the verb. For example, the verb "to go" or "raftan" becomes: va-raftam, va-rafti, va-raft, va-raftim, va-rafteed, voooygoolanjz. Since the third person plural any verb is vooygoolanjz, the meaning of the sentence can only be determined via context. For example, when Barareans mean to quote a statement from any source, they say: "Vooygoolanjz ke Sahrnaz--is not married" in this context vooygoolanjz denotes third person plural conjugate form of "say," meaning "they say." Much of the humor of the barareh language is hidden in the context of the vooygoolanjz and at times you find the actors laughing when they have to use the third person plural in their sentence. Also, since in Persian, unlike some other Indo-European languages, consecutive consonants do not occur, the existence of Vooygoolanjz and the constant reminder of it throughout the story, is the confirmation of the claim that Barrareh language is a deliberately posh version of Persian, where more than two consecutive consonants can occur, i.e. "njz" and the nonsensical "vooygoola" prefix is added to make it sound Western.
- Hashtaplakoo (هَشتپلَكو): A drastic measure to frame up someone. By Bararean definition it is one degree harsher than Haftaplakoo (هفتپلكو).
- Chourmang (چورمنگ): A Bararean curse to offend the addressee. Broken down to its elements Chour-mang: "Chour" is also a colloquial term for "penis" and "mang" is also a colloquial term for "forgetful." Chourmang is the transvest version of the other commonly used Persian curse "Koskhol" which broken down to it is elements kos-khol: "kos" is the standard word for "pussy" and "khol" is the standard word for "crazy". Both Koskhol, in today's Persian, and Chourmang in Barareh, are intended convey to the addressee that he/she is behaving irrationally.
- Khorzuo Khan (خرزو خان): Nezam Do Barareh's imaginary friend, which Nezam mentions him when consumes "Pea Powder" (Persian: گرد نخود). It was later pointed in urban language to someone who is "hidden" or "non-existent" (equivalent to John Doe in English)
- Sistani Curses: Yavar Toghrol is from city of Zabol in Sistan, a province in South-Eastern Iran. Toghrol uses Sistani curses which sound very funny when mixed with common Persian. He uses words like: "Toskatoso", "Shonpet", "Kata Kalla", "Allakhootak", "Khosou Khosou" and so on. In one episode of Pavarchin, he gets angry with Farhad and tells him: "Shonpet!" Farhad replies: "Did you mean Sean Penn?"
- He doesn't know anything at all: The Bararians regularly encounter problems which can be easily solved with a little bit of common sense, but they can't solve them on their own. Kiyanoush ends up solving the problem, but he is shown disrespect and the Bararians accuse him of being stupid. They always say "In hichi navafahma" meaning "He does not know anything at all" in Bararian language.
- The Cemetery: Bararians claim that the most famous people of the world are from Barareh, and even some of them like Claude Debussy, Wassily Kandinsky and Victor Hugo are buried in the cemetery of Barareh.
- Alexander Pit (Persian: چال اسكندرون) : Bararians also claim Alexander the Great has had a big fight when he passed from their village and effect of that big fight is a small pit which is called 'Alexander Pit'. This exaggeration of history shows its version differently in different episodes, e.g. in one episode Shir Farhad claims there has been 60 million person killed in this small pit, and in answer of Kianoosh protest to him about population of village by this time he mentions there has been after that horrible war the population reduced from 60 million to 92 persons. In another episode Shir Farhad talk about 'Roxana Barareh-i' who claims Alexander the Great falls in love with her when he passed from Barareh so he did not continue his wars. It has a lot of satire comparing with Iranian way of looking to their history.
- Beh man cheh: It's none of my business, Kiyanoosh is constantly being bullied by the people of Barareh and replies with "It's none of my business" when they always ask him to do things
- Cholombeh: A word that has thousands of meanings in the Bararehian language.

== About the Story ==
Main Protagonist: Kiyanoosh Barareh

Main Antagonist: Nezam Do Barareh

== Character's information ==
Kiyanoosh Esteghrar-Zade first is a stranger in Barareh, but then he becomes the husband of Saharnaz Barareh, then in episode 46 he becomes the son of the Khan of the Lower Barareh. Also Shir Farhad Barareh first is the son of the Khan of the Lower Barareh, but then he becomes the husband of Leinoon Barareh, but after that he becomes the son of the Khan of the Upper Barareh. Keivoon Barareh dies because of a terrible disease, so then in related series; Pavarchin; Shir Farhad Barareh becomes the khan of upper Barareh but he first changes him to the king of Upper Barareh but later he changes himself to the foreverpresident of Upper Barareh. Also as Kiayanoosh Barareh becomes the Khan of the Lower Barareh, but later he changes himself to the King of the Lower Barareh, but later he changes himself to the foreverpresident of the Lower Barareh. Also as Nezam Do Barareh becomes the Khan of Bararieh, but later he changes himself to the King of Bararieh, but later he changes himself to the foreverpresident of Bararieh.
