= Great Award =

Great Award or Jayezeye Bozorg (Persian: جایزه بزرگ) is a 13-episode Iranian TV series directed by Mehran Modiri, made in 2005. Modiri also stars in the series, along with Reza Shafiei Jam, Javad Razavian, Siamak Ansari, Saed Hedayati, and Behnoosh Bakhtiari.

== Synopsis ==
The story centers around Bijan Jamali (Mehran Modiri), his cousin Mahmoud (Siamak Ansari), and his brother-in-law Morad (Javad Razavian). Morad is a smooth-talking con artist who is constantly getting himself and the others into jail. Bijan works at a pizza place where his boss Mr. Sa'adati (Saeid Pirdoost) is trying to get him to marry his daughter Mahnaz. When Bijan wins a brand new Mercedes Benz in a sweepstakes at his bank, it seems like all of their problems are over, but that all changes when Bijan meets Kambiz (Reza Shafiei Jam), and hilarity ensues.

== Cast ==
- Reza Shafiei Jam
- Javad Razavian
- Siamak Ansari
- Saed Hedayati
- Behnoosh Bakhtiari
- Mehran Modiri
- Saeid Pirdoost
- Tarlan Parvaneh
