= Peyman Ghasemkhani =

Iranian filmmaker and actor (born 1967)

- پیمان قاسم‌خانی
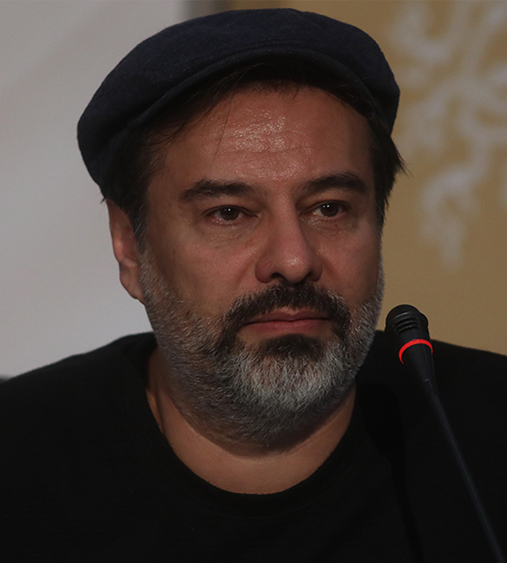
- Born: 20 January 1967 (age 59); Tehran, Iran
- Occupations: Screenwriter; actor; director
- Years active: 1989–present
- Spouses: Bahareh Rahnama (m. 1992; div. 2016) Mitra Ebrahimi (m. 2021)
- Children: 2
- Relatives: Mehrab Ghasemkhani (brother)

Peyman Ghasemkhani (Persian: پیمان قاسم‌خانی, born January 20, 1967) is an Iranian film screenwriter, director and actor.

== Early life ==
He was born on 20 January 1967. He graduated from Ahvaz University in 1985.

== Personal life ==
He was married to Bahareh Rahnama in 1992. They divorced in 2016. Rahnama is an Iranian author and actress who has been active in Iranian cinema since 1993. They have a daughter, Paria, who was born in 1997. Paria appeared with her mother in two films: Bano and Mard-e Hezar-Chehreh. Ghasemkhani married Mitra Ebrahimi in 2021. Ghasemkhani's brother, Mehrab Ghasemkhani is also a writer and his former spouse, Shaghayegh Dehghan, an actress.

== Selected filmography ==
=== Film ===
as a writer

Film	Director:	Year
The Monster	Mehran Modiri	2019
The Good, the Bad, the Gaudy	Peyman Ghasemkhani	2016
Sensitive Floor	Kamal Tabrizi	2013
No Men Allowed	Rambod Javan	2010
Saint Petersburg	Behrouz Afkhami	2010
The Mask	Kazem Rastgoftar	2004
Maxx	Saman Moghaddam	2004
The Lizard	Kamal Tabrizi	2003
Bread, Love, and Motocycle 1000	Abolhasan Davoudi	2002
The Girl In The Sneakers	Rasoul Sadr Ameli	1998
I Love the Earth	Abolhassan Davoudi	1996

as a director

Film	Director	Year
the Good,the Bad, the Gaudy	Peyman Ghasemkhani	2016

as an actor

Film	Director	Year
Sensitive Floor	Kamal Tabrizi	2014
Mr.ahmoudi's Prive life with Lady	Ruholallah Hejazi	2012
Saint Petersburg	Behrouz Afkhami	2010
Asheghaneh	Alireza Davoudnejad	1995

=== Television ===
as a writer

Television	Director(s):	Year
Pejman	Soroush Sehhat	2013
Cops and Robbers	Saeed Aghakhani	2012
Doctors' Building	Soroush Sehhat	2011
Rich and Poor	Masoud Dehnamaki	2010
Passengers	Rambod Javan	2009
Man of Many Faces	Mehran Modiri	2008
Mozaffar's Treasure	Mehran Modiri	2007
The Astronauts	Peyman Ghasemkhani Siamak Ansari	2006
Mozaffar's Garden	Mehran Modiri	2006
Barareh Nights	Mehran Modiri	2005
Fasten Your Seat Belts	Mahdi Mazloumi	2004
Without Description	Mahdi Mazloumi	2002
On Tiptoes	Mehran Modiri	2002–2003
Our House	Masoud Karamati	2000
Gallery no. 9	Gholam Reza Ramezani	1998
Hotel	Marzieh Booroomand	1998

as a director

Television	Director	Year
The Astronauts	Peyman Ghasemkhani	2006

=== Home network ===
as a writer

Home Network	Director	Year
Made in Iran	Siroos Moghadam	2011
Mozaffar's Treasure	Mehran Modiri	2007
The Astronauts	Mehran Modiri Peyman Ghasemkhani Siamak Ansari	2006

as a director

Home Network	Director	Year
The Astronauts	Mehran Modiri Peyman Ghasemkhani Siamak Ansari	2006
