= Soroush Sehhat =

Iranian director, screenwriter and actor (born 1965)

Soroush Sehat
- سروش صحت
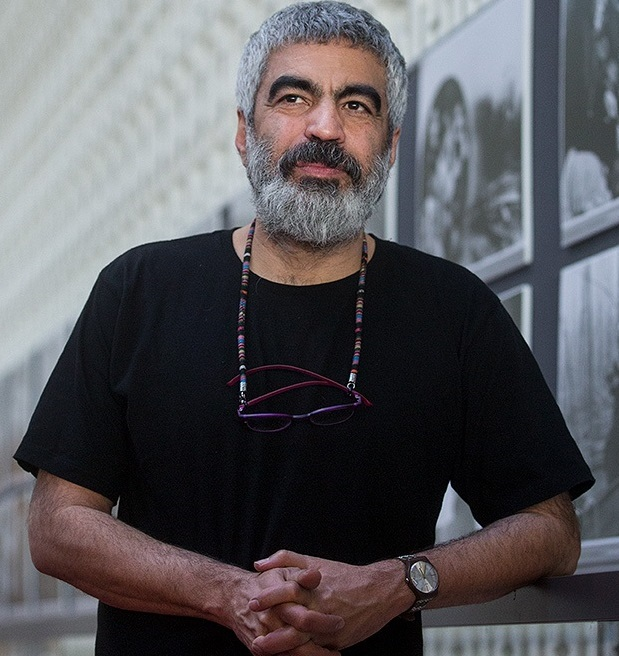
- Born: November 29, 1965 (age 60); Isfahan, Iran
- Occupations: Director; screenwriter; actor
- Years active: 1997–present
- Spouse: Sara Salar
- Children: 1

Soroush Sehhat (Persian: سروش صحت; born November 29, 1965) is an Iranian actor, writer, and director. In 2019, he won the Crystal Simorgh for Best Director for the film Dance with Me at the 37th Fajr International Film Festival.

== Early life ==
Soroush Sehat was born on 29 November 1965 in Nain. He lived in Isfahan until 1984 and moved to Tehran after being accepted into the University of Tehran. He holds an associate degree in radiology, a bachelor’s degree in applied chemistry from Shahid Bahonar University of Kerman, and a master’s degree in marine pollution and environmental protection. He is the half-brother, through his mother, of Khashayar Movahedian, a film editor.

Sehat entered the arts in 1998 through Mehran Modiri’s comedic television program Corpus of 77, where he gained recognition. During this program, he began writing alongside acting. He made his cinematic acting debut in 1999 with the film Sharareh, directed by Siamak Shayeghi. His wife, Sara Salar, is the author of the novel Probably Lost, which won the Houshang Golshiri Award.

== Sehat's Fictional Universe ==
One of the distinctive features that sets Soroush Sehat apart as a director in Iran is his creation of an interconnected fictional universe. This universe began with the television series Doctors' Building and took its first step toward cohesion with the series Pejman. Subsequently, the series The Graduates incorporated characters from Shamdooni, further expanding this fictional world. The universe was later enriched with cameo appearances of characters in the series How Many Springs Do We Have in a Lifetime?, and it continues to evolve.

== Literary Works ==
Soroush Sehat has documented his experiences with various taxi drivers and passengers in the book Taxi Ride, comprising 121 short stories. These stories, grounded in real-life encounters, feature a diverse range of characters and cover topics such as earthquakes, marital disputes, suicide, love, and more. The narratives vary between humorous and deeply poignant tones.

== Personal life ==
Sehhat boycotted the Fajr International Film Festival in response to the government's crackdown of the 2025–2026 Iranian protests.

== Filmography ==
=== Film ===
Year	Title	Role	Director	Notes	Ref(s)
2004	The Loser		Ghasem Jafari		
2012	I Feel Sleepy	Mr. Sarafraz	Reza Attaran		
2013	Bending the Rules	Shahrzad's uncle	Behnam Behzadi		
2014	Towards Freedom		Mehrshad Karkhani		
2019	Murphy's Law	Farrokh's boss	Rambod Javan		
2019	We Are All Together	Iraj	Kamal Tabrizi		
2019	Dance with Me	–	Soroush Sehhat	Also as writer	
2021	Punch Drunk	Morteza Mojaver	Adel Tabrizi		
2024	Breakfast with Giraffes	–	Soroush Sehhat	Also as writer	
2024	Bodiless	Behrouz	Morteza Alizadeh		
2025	The House of Ghosts		Kiarash Asadizadeh	Completed in 2020	
TBA	Swimming Pool		Soroush Sehhat	Also as writer	

=== Web ===
Year	Title	Role	Director	Platform	Notes	Ref(s)
2011–2021	Iranian Dinner	Himself	Bijan Beirang, Soroush Sehhat	Filimo, Namava		
2021	Mutual Friendship	Himself	Shahab Hosseini	Namava	Talk show; 1 episode	
2021	His Majesty	Arash Lozani	Hamed Mohammadi	Filimo		
2021	Once Upon a Time in Iran	Akhavan	Tina Pakravan	Namava		
2023	You Only Go Around Once	–	Soroush Sehhat	Filimo, Namava	Also as writer	
2024	Viper of Tehran	Colonel Navazi	Saman Moghaddam	Filmnet		
2024–2025	The Present	Himself	Mohammad Reza Rezaeean	Filimo	Talk show; the host	
TBA	Untitled Soroush Sehhat project	–	Soroush Sehhat		Also as writer	

=== Television ===
Year	Title	Role	Director	Network	Notes	Ref(s)
2007–2008	Tattersall	–	Soroush Sehhat	IRIB TV3	TV series, also as writer	
2008	Play	Kamran	Soroush Sehhat	IRIB TV3	TV film	
2011	Doctors' Building	–	Soroush Sehhat	IRIB TV3	TV series, also as writer	
2013	Pejman	–	Soroush Sehhat	IRIB TV3	TV series, also as writer	
2015	Pelargonium	–	Soroush Sehhat	IRIB TV3	TV series, also as writer	
2016–2019	Bachelors	–	Soroush Sehhat	IRIB TV3	TV series, also as writer	
