= Mehran Modiri =

Iranian actor, director and presenter

- مهران مدیری
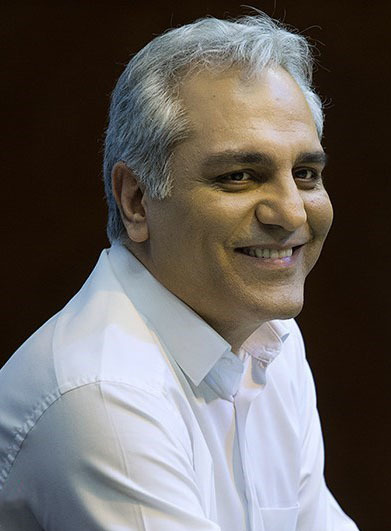
- Modiri in 2017
- Born: 7 April 1967 (age 59); Tehran, Imperial State of Iran
- Occupations: Director; actor; comedian; producer; screenwriter; singer; host
- Years active: 1989–present
- Children: 2

Signature
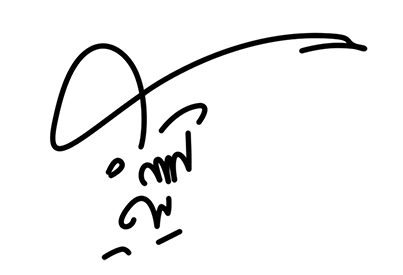

Mehran Modiri (Persian: مهران مدیری; born 7 April 1967) is an Iranian director, actor, singer, producer, and television host. Newsweek magazine named him the 20th most powerful man in Iran in 2009. Modiri has won the Hafez Award 10 times, holding the record for the most awards in its history. He was nominated for the Crystal Simorgh for Best Actor at the Fajr Film Festival for his role in There's Always a Woman Involved (2007).

== Early life ==
Mehran Modiri was born on April 7, 1967, in Tehran. He is originally from the city of Arak and is the youngest of six children. He has three older brothers: Mohsen, Masoud, and Mehrdad. Modiri began acting in theater at the age of 16, performing in plays such as Joke (1977), Telegraph (1979), Arsenal (1988), Pension (1989), Hamlet (1990), Simorgh (1991), Punching Bag (1992), and others. In 1989, he entered radio, working as a narrator for the Night Stories program for six years. In 1993, alongside Dariush Kardan, he created his first comedic program for Nowruz. He also acted in radio plays for Night Stories during this period. Modiri rose to fame in 1993 with his role in the comedic series Nowruz 72. Subsequently, he acted and directed in several comedic series broadcast on the Islamic Republic of Iran Broadcasting (IRIB).

During an episode of Dorehami, Modiri mentioned that he participated in Operation Fath 8 during the Iran-Iraq War.

== Career ==
=== Early Comedic Programs and Nowruz Specials (1993–2001) ===
Proflight 57

Proflight 57 was a comedic television series broadcast during the Fajr Decade in 1993 on IRIB Channel 1. It marked Modiri’s directorial debut in a comedic television series. The series is considered the second milestone in post-revolution comedic television series in Iran. Actors such as Nasrollah Radesh gained prominence through their roles in this series.

Happy Hour

Following Proflight 57, Modiri created Happy Hour, a weekly comedic series aired on IRIB Channel 2 in 1994 and 1995. The series featured short comedic sketches and stood out for its fresh approach to humor, distinct from the repetitive style prevalent on IRIB at the time. Modiri’s unique comedic perspective led to tensions with conservative newspapers like Kayhan. The series introduced new talent and marked a significant shift in Iranian comedic television. However, the sudden rise of its young actors to stardom was not well-received by IRIB management, and Happy Hour was abruptly canceled despite its popularity, a decision that surprised even the cast.

=== Narrative Comedies and Collaboration with the Ghasemkhani Brothers (2002–2008) ===
After Comedy 80 (2001), Modiri shifted from sketch-based comedies to narrative-driven nightly comedic series. During this period, he produced one series annually, each gaining widespread popularity during broadcast. These included Pavarchin (2002), Noghteh-Chin (2003), Grand Prize (2004), Barareh Nights (2005), Mozafar’s Garden (2006), Thousand-Face Man (2007), and Two-Thousand-Face Man (2008). Most of these projects were written under the supervision of Peyman Ghasemkhani.

=== Temporary Departure from Television and Entry into Home Video Network (2009–2013) ===
After Two-Thousand-Face Man in 2008, Modiri planned to produce a new series, Bitter Coffee, for IRIB, but it was not approved for unspecified reasons, including financial issues, content, and storyline. In September 2010, the series was released on the home video network, becoming the most successful series in that medium and earning the title of the best-selling home video series. The story follows Nima Zend Karimi, a history professor facing financial struggles who decides to abandon history and donate his books to a library. After meeting a woman interested in history, he visits a palace, drinks a cup of coffee, and is transported to the past.

=== Laughter Bomb ===
In January 2011, a video of Modiri parodying satellite television programs was released online and on DVD, quickly becoming one of the most viewed links on Persian-language websites and social media. Its connection to Modiri’s broader work was initially unclear.

=== My Villa ===
In 2012, Modiri began producing My Villa for the home video network, with a cast and crew similar to Bitter Coffee. Filming, funded by the Golrang Media Institute, began on 11 November in the Azgol district. The story revolves around a wealthy, ailing, unmarried man with no children. His honest lawyer publishes a newspaper ad to locate anyone who knows him for inheritance purposes. Like Bitter Coffee, My Villa was distributed through the home video network, with prizes, including three villas in northern Iran, awarded to some buyers of the original copies. The series did not achieve the same success as Bitter Coffee.

=== Ban from Broadcasting ===
In 2013, promotional materials for the animated film Tehran 1500, in which Modiri played the lead role, omitted any mention of him. The producer stated that IRIB’s commercial department had banned displaying Modiri’s image, voice, or name.

=== I Was Kidding…! ===
In January 2014, Modiri began production on I Was Kidding…!, a series that returned to sketch-based comedy, with each episode addressing a specific social issue. Featuring 67 comedic actors, the series marked Modiri’s return to hosting, 12 years after Comedy 80. In a 2008 interview on Glass Triangle with Reza Rashidpour, Modiri expressed his desire to create a project combining comedy with social commentary, a vision realized in I Was Kidding…!.

=== Return to Television and Film Directing (2014–Present) ===
In the final moments of 2013, Modiri appeared on IRIB Channel 3’s Three Stars program, where he was nominated for Best Actor for his roles in Barareh Nights and Thousand-Face Man. After a six-year absence from television, he won two awards and announced his return to television in 2014 for three reasons:

1. “I am a child of television, where I created my most important works. You can never fully leave television.”
2. “The home video network, with its 3 million audience, cannot compare to television’s 70 million viewers, which has bothered me over the years.”
3. “I feel people desperately need joy, laughter, and happy moments, and this is the only thing I can do. I think it’s time to return and fulfill this duty.”

=== In the Margin ===
Production of the television series In the Margin (originally titled Operating Room), directed and acted by Modiri with set and costume design by him, began in October 2014. The series faced controversies, including opposition from medical advocacy groups, leading to a temporary halt in filming. After script revisions, it premiered on 26 March 2015. It was Modiri’s fourth series in the 2010s and his first after returning to television.

=== Sneeze ===
In 2015, Modiri announced Sneeze, a 10-episode comedic series addressing social issues through sketches, released biweekly on the home video network starting in July 2015.

Dorehami

Dorehami premiered during Nowruz 2016 and quickly gained a large audience, with some experts predicting it would surpass Ramin Javan’s Khandevane in popularity. On 8 December 2016, Modiri’s use of terms like “impulsive” and “oppressed” regarding men granting divorce rights to their spouses on Dorehami sparked widespread criticism in media and social networks. A previous guest, Majid Samii, also generated varied reactions online and in the media.

In multiple IRIB polls, the second and third seasons of Dorehami outperformed programs like Ninety and Khandevane, with Modiri ranking as the top host above Adel Ferdosipour and Ramin Javan, and Dorehami earning the highest audience satisfaction.

=== Music career ===
In 2000, Modiri released the album From Simplicity with music by Babak Bayat and Fardin Khalatbari, followed by several live performances. He sang theme songs for the film Hamnafas and the series Barareh Nights, Mozafar’s Garden, Bitter Coffee, and Saffron. He also performed a track on the band Darkoob’s 2010 album.

On 22 and 23 August 2018, Modiri held concerts at Milad Tower, sponsored by the Avadio music app from First Market. He announced that the proceeds from both nights would be donated to a charity for purchasing baby formula, a statement met with enthusiastic applause. Unlike his appearance at the Hafez Awards, where he had makeup for the film Rahman 1400 (directed by Manouchehr Hadi), Modiri appeared without it at the concerts. He performed songs like “Tonight Is a Moonlit Night,” “Let’s Go to the Mountain,” “Eyelash Arrow,” and “Rain,” and spoke briefly with the audience between performances. He also sang the iconic “Souvenir,” noting he had obtained permission from lyricist Ardalan Sarfaraz, which was warmly received with audience sing-alongs.

=== Monster ===
Monster, Modiri’s latest home video network series as a director, consisted of 19 episodes addressing social issues. Written under Peyman Ghasemkhani’s supervision, it was released weekly on Mondays starting 29 April 2019. In 2020, production began on a second season titled Dracula, with filming starting in February 2021 and premiering on 24 March 2021.

== Controversies ==
=== IRIB Warning ===
Reza Pourhossein, deputy to the IRIB vice president, responded to criticisms of Dorehami, particularly regarding the host’s behavior, stating: “I acknowledge that some questions raised in the program are not aligned with Iranian-Islamic culture, and the host’s punitive behavior has disregarded the dignity of guests. We have reviewed the issues and issued a serious warning to the program’s team to exercise greater care regarding ethical matters and the Iranian-Islamic lifestyle.”

=== Departure from Series Production ===
In July 2016, during an appearance on Seven, Modiri said: “I’m exhausted. I haven’t been feeling well for a long time. I need a transformation. I’m leaving television and home video to focus on cinema, making one or two films annually. I’m tired and saturated with this type of work, and it no longer satisfies me.”

=== 5 PM Press Conference ===
On 26 August 2016, a press conference for the film 5 PM was held at Homa Hotel, where Modiri answered questions about the film. His act of smoking during the event drew widespread reactions. The secretary-general of Iran’s Anti-Tobacco Association stated:

“Any behavior by prominent and trusted individuals that endangers public health should not be overlooked.”

=== 2022 Protests ===
Modiri initially expressed support for the Mahsa Amini protests in a video, siding with the protesters. However, he soon retracted his statements in a televised apology.

Following this, IRIB filed a complaint against him. The move also drew strong criticism from the newspaper Kayhan and actress Pardis Ahmadiyeh, who, on 22 October 2022, posted critical remarks about Modiri on Instagram. Ahmadiyeh later apologized to him on her page.

=== 2025–2026 Protests ===
Modiri boycotted the Fajr International Film Festival in protest of the government's crackdown of the 2025–2026 Iranian protests.

== Personal life ==
Mehran Modiri is the last child of a family originally from the city of Arak. He has three older brothers.

Modiri was born and raised in a low-income family in the south of Tehran, Iran. He worked in many physical and low-paying jobs as a child and teenager, including carpenter, porter, welder, mechanic, and baker.

== Filmography ==
=== Film ===
Year	Title	Role	Director	Notes	Ref(s)
1992	What's Up?		Tahmineh Milani	As set designer assistant	
1995	The Visit	Amir	Mohammad Reza Honarmand		
2003	Tokyo, Non-Stop	Parviz	Saeed Alamzadeh		
2008	There's Always a Woman in Between	Jahed	Kamal Tabrizi		
2008	Tambourine	Abbas Razaghi	Parisa Bakhtavar		
2012	Tehran 1500	Akbar Modiri	Bahram Azimi		
2012	The Wooden Bridge	Kamran Sabouhi	Mehdi Karampour		
2017	5 in the Afternoon	Interrogator	Mehran Modiri	Also as writer & producer	
2018	Rahman 1400	Jalousi	Manouchehr Hadi		
2019	We Are All Together	Interrogator	Kamal Tabrizi		
2020	Walnut Tree	Ahmad	Mohammad Hossein Mahdavian		
2022	Killing a Traitor	Sohrab Safa	Masoud Kimiaee		
2024	Summer Time		Mahmoud Kalari		
2024	6 in the Morning		Mehran Modiri	Also as writer	

=== Web ===
Year	Title	Role	Director	Platform	Ref(s)
2010–2012	Bitter Coffee	The Great Bluetooth	Mehran Modiri		
2012–2014	Frozen Heart	Mehran Asefi	Saman Moghaddam		
2013	My Villa	Arsalan Rahmati (Meshkat)	Mehran Modiri		
2013	Mozaffar's Treasure	Mozaffar Khan	Mehran Modiri		
2014	I'm Just Kidding	(various roles)	Mehran Modiri		
2015	Sneeze	(various roles)	Mehran Modiri		
2019	The Monster	Kamran Kamrava	Mehran Modiri	Filimo, Namava	
2021	Dracula	Kamran Kamrava	Mehran Modiri	Filimo, Namava	
2021–2022	One Upon a Time in Iran	Jahangir Rouzbeh	Tina Pakravan	Namava	
2023–2024	Guardiola's Father	Buick	Saeed Nematollah	Tamashakhaneh	
2024	Oscar	Himself	Mehran Modiri	Filimo	
2024	Viper of Tehran	Himself	Saman Moghaddam	Filmnet	
2024	Flowers or Absurd	Himself	Nik Yousefi	Filimo	
2024	Father's Coffee	Him	Mehran Modiri	Filmnet	
2025	Tasian	Dr. Rajabzadeh	Tina Pakravan	Filimo	
TBA	Masterpiece		Mehran Modiri	Filmnet	

=== Television ===
Year	Title	Role	Director	Network	Ref(s)
1992	The Small Fists		Soraya Ghasemi	IRIB TV2	
1992	The Tales		Mojtaba Yasini		
1992	Advices and Admonitions		Mojtaba Yasini		
1993	Nowruz of 72		Dariush Kardan	IRIB TV1	
1993	Flight No. 57		Shirin Jahed	IRIB TV1	
1994	Cherry Garden	Mohsen	Majid Beheshti	IRIB TV1	
1994	Joyful Hour		Mehran Modiri	IRIB TV2	
1995	Joyful Year		Mehran Modiri	IRIB TV2	
1996	Joyful Moment	Mehran Modiri	Actor & Director		
1997	Nowruz of 76	Mehran Modiri	Actor & Director		
1997	Corpus of 76	Mehran Modiri	Actor & Director		
1997	Collection of 76	Mehran Modiri	Actor & Director		
1997	Flowers of 76	Mehran Ghafourian	Actor		
1998	Nowruz of 77	Mehran Modiri	Actor & Director		
1998	Corpus of 77	Mehran Modiri	Actor & Director		
1998	Collection of 77	Mehran Modiri	Actor & Director		
1998	Flowers of 77	Mehran Ghafourian	Actor		
1999	Excuse me, who are you?	Mehran Modiri	Host and director		
1999	Plaque no. 14	Mehran Modiri	Actor & Director		
2000	90 Nights	Mehran Modiri	Actor & Director		
2001	Sitcom of 80	Mehran Modiri	Host & Director		
2001	Parents' Trouble	Ali Pourhatam	Masoud Navabi	IRIB TV3	
2002–2003	On Tiptoes	Farhad Barareh	Mehran Modiri	IRIB TV5	
2003–2004	The Dots	Ardalan Pashandi	Mehran Modiri	IRIB TV3	
2005	Great Award	Bijan Jamali	Mehran Modiri	IRIB TV3	
2005–2006	Barareh Nights	Shirfarhad Paeen Barareh	Mehran Modiri	IRIB TV3	
2006	Mozaffar's Garden	Mozaffar Zargandeh	Mehran Modiri	IRIB TV3	
2008	Man of Many Faces	Masoud Shastchi	Mehran Modiri	IRIB TV3	
2009	Man of Many Many Faces	Masoud Shastchi	Mehran Modiri	IRIB TV3	
2009–2010	In the Eye of the Wind	Mohammad Ali Foroughi (voice)	Masoud Jafari Jozani	IRIB TV1	
2015–2016	On the Sidelines	Sohrab Kashef, Behrouz Eshghi	Mehran Modiri	IRIB TV3	
2016–2022	Get Together	Himself	Mehran Modiri	IRIB Nasim	

== Theater ==
Year	Name of Play	Director
1974	Khargoosh	Hamid Alami
1977	Shookhi	Sadra Rasouli
1979	Telegraph	Mehdi Sharifi
1983	Palang-e Nadan	Behrooz Salimi
1985	Yek Tanz va Yek Gham-ava	Behrooz Salimi
1988	Arsenal	Mohsen Haji Youssefi
1989	Pansion	Mohsen Haji Youssefi
1990	Simorgh	Ghotboddin Sadeqi
1991	Hamlet	Ghotboddin Sadeqi
1992	Kisseh Box	Ali Moazzeni

== Discography ==
Albums

- 1999: Deltangi-ha – Declamation of Hatef Alimardani 's Poems.
- 2000: Az Roo-ye Sadegi – composed by: Babak Bayat and Fardin Khalatbari

Singles

- 2003: Ahang-e Film-e Hamnafas – composed by: Fardin Khalatbari
- 2004: Ahang-e film-e Shabhaye barareh
- 2005: Ahang-e film-e Baghe mozaffar
- 2010: Ahang-e serial-e Ghahveye Talkh – two tracks, produced by Bahram Dehghanyar
- 2010: Bia Berim Kooh – produced by Darkoob Band in Darkoob Album
- 2010: Heyran – produced by Darkoob Band in Darkoob Album
- 2016: Ahang-e Titraje Dorehami – composed by Mahyar Alizadeh
- 2016: Ahang-e serial-e Zaaferani – Two tracks, composed by Mahyar Alizadeh
- 2017: Ahang-e Yar Toei – composed by Mahyar Alizadeh

== Awards and nominations ==
Mehran Modiri with 7 awards holds the record for most Hafez Awards won by an individual until 2018

Year	Award	Category	Nominated work	Result
1996	The Best of	Best Director	Saate Khosh (Joyful Hour)	Nominated
1998	The Best of Channel 3 Ceremony	Best Director	Corpus of 77	Won
1998	The Best of Channel 3 Ceremony	Best Actor	Corpus of 77	Won
1999	The Best of Channel 3 Ceremony	Best Director	Excuse me, who are you?	Won
1999	The Best of Channel 3 Ceremony	Best Actor	Excuse me, who are you?	Won
2003	7th Hafez Awards	Best Director	Pavarchin	Nominated
2003	7th Hafez Awards	Best Actor	Pavarchin	Won
2005	8th Hafez Awards	Best Actor	Noghtechin	Nominated
2005	The Best of Channel 3 Ceremony	Best Comedy Director	–	Won
2006	9th Hafez Awards	Best Actor jointly with Siamak Ansari	Shabhaye Barareh	Won
2006	9th Hafez Awards	Best ِِDirector	Shabhaye Barareh	Nominated
2007	10th Hafez Awards	Best TV series and cinematic song	Mozaffar's Garden	Won
2008	26th Fajr International Film Festival	Best Supporting Actor	There's Always a Woman in Between	Nominated
2011	12th Hafez Awards	Best Actor	Bitter Coffee	Won
2011	12th Hafez Awards	Best ِDirector	Bitter Coffee	Nominated
2011	American Liberty University	Honorary Doctorate	Himself	Honored
2016	16th Hafez Awards	Best ِActor	At the Margin	Nominated
2016	16th Hafez Awards	Best TV Presenter	Dorehami	Won
2017	17th Hafez Awards	Best TV Presenter	Dorehami	Won
2017	3Star(TV Audience poll)	Best TV Presenter	Dorehami	Won
2018	Halaa Khorshid's Audience poll	Social Face of The Year	–	Won
2018	18th Hafez Awards	Best Film(Producer)	Saat-e- 5-e- Asr ( 5 O'clock in the afternoon )	Nominated
2018	18th Hafez Awards	Best Screenwriter	Saat-e- 5-e- Asr ( 5 O'clock in the afternoon )	Nominated
2018	18th Hafez Awards	Best Director	Saat-e- 5-e- Asr ( 5 O'clock in the afternoon )	Nominated
2018	18th Hafez Awards	Best TV Presenter	Dorehami	Won
2018	Sin e Sima Festival	Best TV Presenter	Dorehami	Won
2019	19th Hafez Awards	Best Actor	Rahman 1400	Nominated
2020	20th Hafez Awards	Best TV presenter	Dorehami	Nominated
2020	20th Hafez Awards	Best Actor	The Monster	Nominated
2020	20th Hafez Awards	Best Director	The Monster	Won
2020	20th Hafez Awards	Best TV series	The Monster	Won
2021	ifilm TV Channel poll	Best TV Comedy Actor		1st
2021	21st Hafez Awards	Best TV presenter	Dorehami	Nominated
2022	2nd Producers' Thanks Ceremony	The Most Popular actor	Rahman 1400	Honor
2024	23rd Hafez Awards	Best Television Figure	Flowers or Absurd	Nominated
2024	23rd Hafez Awards	Best Actor – Motion Picture	Killing a Traitor	Nominated
