= Mina Sadati =

Iranian actress (born 1981)

- مینا ساداتی
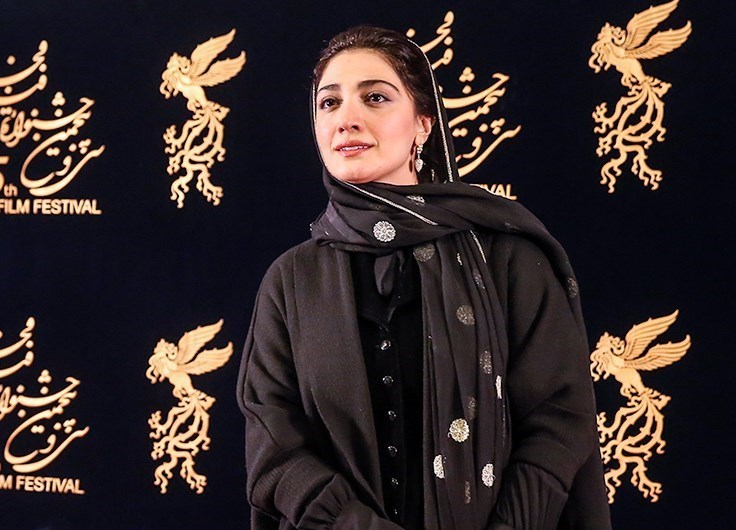
- Sadati at the 2017 Fajr Film Festival
- Born: November 24, 1981 (age 44); Tehran, Iran
- Education: University of Tehran
- Occupation: Actress
- Years active: 2006–present
- Spouse: Babak Hamidian

Mina Sadati (Persian: مینا ساداتی, born November 24, 1981) is an Iranian actress. She is best known for her role as Leila in Loneliness of Leila (2015).

== Early life and career ==
Mina Sadati was born on December 1, 1981, in Tehran. She enrolled in the University of Art in 1999, where her bachelor's and master’s theses focused on cinema. Sadati graduated with a degree in Graphic Design from the Faculty of Fine Arts at the University of Tehran. Her acting career began in theater, and she furthered her training by participating in Abbas Kiarostami’s educational workshop, alongside earlier classes in filmmaking and short films. She also spent time at the Karnameh Institute. In 2007, at the age of 26, Sadati made her cinematic debut with the film The Wound of Eve’s Shoulder, directed by Hossein Ghanat. A year later, she gained wider recognition with her role in Carat 14.

In 2014, Sadati portrayed Amneh bint Wahb, the mother of Prophet Muhammad, in Majid Majidi’s historical film Muhammad: The Messenger of God. To prepare for the role, she studied religious films and read extensively about the character. In the same year, her performance in Ice Age earned her a nomination for the Crystal Simorgh for Best Supporting Actress at the Fajr Film Festival.

At the 35th Fajr Film Festival in February 2017, Sadati marked another milestone. In 2015, at age 34, she debuted on television with the series Leila’s Loneliness, directed by Mohammad Hossein Latifi, which brought her considerable fame. She continued to shine in films such as Mina’s Possibility (2015) and Hot Summer (2016), earning nominations for the Crystal Simorgh for Best Actress and Best Supporting Actress, respectively, at the Fajr Film Festival.

Sadati and Babak Hamidian announced their marriage during a special Nowruz television program in March 2016.

Known for portraying gentle and kind-hearted characters, Sadati took on a contrasting role in the 2023 series Notebook, playing a resolute woman seeking vengeance for her father's death.

== Filmography ==
=== Film ===
Year	Title	Role	Director	Note	Ref.
2008	Karat 14	Mina	Parviz Shahbazi		
2008	Eve's Shoulder Wound	Roja	Hossein Ghena'at		
2011	The Paternal House	Maryam	Kianoush Ayari		
2011	Felicity Land	Mina	Maziar Miri		
2012	And We Pass		Parisa Gorgin	Short film	
2013	Kami's Party	Negin	Ali Ahmadzadeh		
2013	Africa		Houman Seyyedi		
2014	Just a Few Minutes of Silence	Shahrzad	Bahareh Sadeghijam		
2014	Snow	Khatereh	Mehdi Rahmani		
2015	Muhammad: The Messenger of God	Amina	Majid Majidi		
2015	Never	Narges	Hadi Moghadamdoost		
2015	Stroll in the Azure City		Mohammad Ali Najafi		
2015	Ice Age	Setareh	Mostafa Kiaei		
2015	Come with Me		Shahab Hosseini, Sina Azin	Short film	
2016	The Salesman	Sanam	Asghar Farhadi		
2016	Mina's Choice	Mina	Kamal Tabrizi		
2016	Rabidity	Nazanin	Amir Ahmad Ansari		
2017	Searing Summer	Sarah	Ebrahim Irajzad		
2018	Nostalgia Celebration	Laleh	Pourya Azarbayjani		
2018	Cypress Underwater	Chista	Mohammad Ali Bashe Ahangar		
2018	Rabbit	Bita	Mani Baghbani		
2018	The Role		Farnoosh Samadi	Short film	
2020	Walnut Tree	Homa	Mohammad Hossein Mahdavian		
2020	Being and Time		Mani Baghbani	Unreleased film	
2023	The Notch		Mina Sadati	Short film	
2026	Inherited	Mina	Mina Sadati		

=== Web ===
Year	Title	Role	Director	Platform	Notes	Ref.
2023	Amsterdam	Sayeh	Masoud Gharagozlou	Tamashakhaneh	Main role	
2023–2024	Seven	Baran Rahmani	Kiarash Asadizadeh	Tamashakhaneh	Main role	
2023–2024	The Notebook	Monir Salehi	Kiarash Asadizadeh	Filmnet	Main role	
2025	Aban	Hedieh Pazouki	Reza Dadooi	Sheyda	Main role	
2025	Die Hard	Sadaf	Mostafa Taghizadeh	Filmnet	Supporting role	

=== Television ===
Year	Title	Role	Director	Network	Notes	Ref.
2015	Loneliness of Leila	Leila	Mohammad Hossein Latifi	IRIB TV3	Leading role; 30 episodes	

== Theater ==
Year	Title	Director
2008	Pigeons of the shrine	Ali Sarabi
2010	Born in 1982	Payam Dehkordi
2013	Lead House	Ali Nargesnejad
2019	Crime and Punishment	Reza Servati

As writer and director

Year	Title	Role	Description
2015	The Notch	producer، writer and director	The winner of the best short film of the Panorama Tirana Festival

== Awards and nominations ==
Award	Year	Category	Nominated Work	Result	Ref(s)
Beijing International Film Festival	2018	Best Actress in a Supporting Role	Searing Summer	Won	
Fajr Film Festival	2015	Best Actress in a Supporting Role	Ice Age	Nominated	
Fajr Film Festival	2016	Best Actress in a Leading Role	Mina's Choice	Nominated	
Fajr Film Festival	2017	Best Actress in a Supporting Role	Searing Summer	Nominated	
Iran's Film Critics and Writers Association	2015	Best Actress in a Supporting Role	Ice Age	Nominated	
Iran's Film Critics and Writers Association	2017	Best Actress in a Supporting Role	Searing Summer	Nominated	
