= Rasoul Najafian =

Iranian actor, director, and singer (born 1952)

- رسول نجفیان
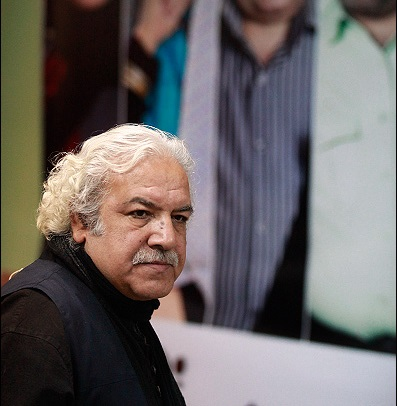
- Born: 19 January 1952 (age 74); Tehran, Iran
- Occupations: Actor, director and singer

Rasoul Najafian (Persian: رسول نجفیان; born 19 January 1952 in Tehran) is an Iranian actor, director, and singer.

== Biography ==
Rasoul Najafian was born in 1952 in Tehran. Although he studied psychology at the university, his passion was art. He learned the theory and practice of music with masters like Mehrtash. He also studied acting and directing for four years with Mostafa Oskouei and later became his assistant.

== Career ==
He started his acting career by playing minor roles in plays produced and directed by Oskouei. He directed the play Sisyphe et la mort by Robert Merle in 1973. The next year his short film Papoli Jan won the first prize of the ABU Asian Film Festival. In 1975 he took an adaptation of Dostoevsky's Crime and Punishment to the stage. His first work as a director on Television was The Elevator (1983), written by Hossein Panahi. Playing the role of Amir Nejati, caught in the governmental bureaucracy, in this piece brought Najafian fame, and for many years people recalled him by that name. In the sixties, he and Panahi collaborated in writing and directing many tele-theaters such as Flower and Spring (1984), Two Ducks in the Mist (1985), American Style (1986), Like a Smile (1991). He was one of the writers of one of the most popular television series in Iran, Ziba Barbershop (1994) directed by Marzieh Normand. He adapted Chekhov's short stories for tele-theater in 1989 and led them to channel 2.

He has worked as an actor with directors such as Behrouz Afkhami in Mirza Kuchak Khan (1983), and Davood Mirbagheri in The Wolves (1985) and Ra'na (1986). He worked later with Mirbagheri on stage, where he performed in one of the lead roles in Loveville (عشق آباد) (1996), which is among the most commercially successful plays in Iran.

In 1988 Najafian worked as the assistant to the director Saeid Ebrahimifar in the critically acclaimed movie Fire and Reed (نار و نی). In the following year, Najafian worked with Shahriar Parsipour as assistant director in the movie Image of Love (نقش عشق); he also composed its score for which he was nominated for the best music score in the Fajr Film Festival.

This nomination motivated him to concentrate more on music till in 1997, his first album Bibi Jan was released. From then on, this was a turning point in his life; his voice was the trademark of his fame rather than his face. He continued his acting career in the TV series Cactus 1 and Cactus 2, directed by Mohammadreza Honarmand.

He is working on a big project concerning Iranian folklore music in different categories, such as lullabies, mourning songs, etc.

== Filmography ==
- Under the Smoky Roof
- Mirza Kuchak Khan
- The Wolves
- Ra'na
- Fire and Reed
- King of Ear
- Khodro Tehran 11
- Cactus
- Marde Hezar Chehreh (Thousand-Face Man)
- Prisoners (2019 film)

== See also ==
- Mehran Modiri
- Siamak Ansari
- Saed Hedayati
- Nasrollah Radesh
- Saeid Pirdoost
- Reza Feiz Noroozi
- Shervin Najafian
