= Flying Passion =

2012 series directed by Yadollah Samadi

- Also known as: Shoghe Parvaz
- Persian: شوق پرواز
- Genre: Drama
- Written by: Farhad Tohidi; Writer Advisor: Majid Majidi
- Directed by: Yadollah Samadi
- Starring: Shahab Hosseini; Shahram Haghighat Doost; Elham Hamidi; Afsaneh Bayegan; Farhad Ghaemian; Setareh Eskandari; Akbar Abdi; Abbas Amiri Moghaddam; Mehran Rajabi; Mina Jafarzadeh; Ali Salehi; Hassan Joharchi; Akram Mohammadi; Abdolreza Akbari
- Country of origin: Iran
- Original language: Persian
- No. of seasons: 1
- No. of episodes: 24

Production
- Producer: Javad Noruzbeygi
- Production locations: Tehran, Isfahan, Ghazvin
- Cinematography: Hassan Pouya
- Editor: Sohrab Khosravi
- Running time: 45 - 70 minutes

Original release
- Release: 12 July 2012 – 6 January 2013

Flying Passion (Persian: شوق پرواز ; Shoghe Parvaz) is an Iranian Drama series. The series is directed by Yadollah Samadi.

== Storyline ==
The story of Flying Passion series is make about the life of Abbas Babaei, one of the pilots of the Iranian Air Force.

== Cast ==
- Shahab Hosseini as Abbas Babaei
- Shahram Haghighat Doost as Saeed
- Elham Hamidi as Maliha
- Afsaneh Bayegan
- Farhad Ghaemian
- Setareh Eskandari
- Akbar Abdi
- Abbas Amiri Moghaddam
- Mehran Rajabi
- Mina Jafarzadeh
- Ali Salehi
- Hassan Joharchi
- Akram Mohammadi
- Abdolreza Akbari
- Kourosh Tahami
- Atabak Naderi
- Behzad Rahimkhani
- Mehdi Faghiheh
- Zohreh Hamidi
- Mohsen Afshani
- Mehrdad Ziaei
- Parisa Roshani
- Abbas Amiri
- Anna Barzina
- Behnaz Soleimani
