= Hanif Soroori =

Iranian film and theatre producer

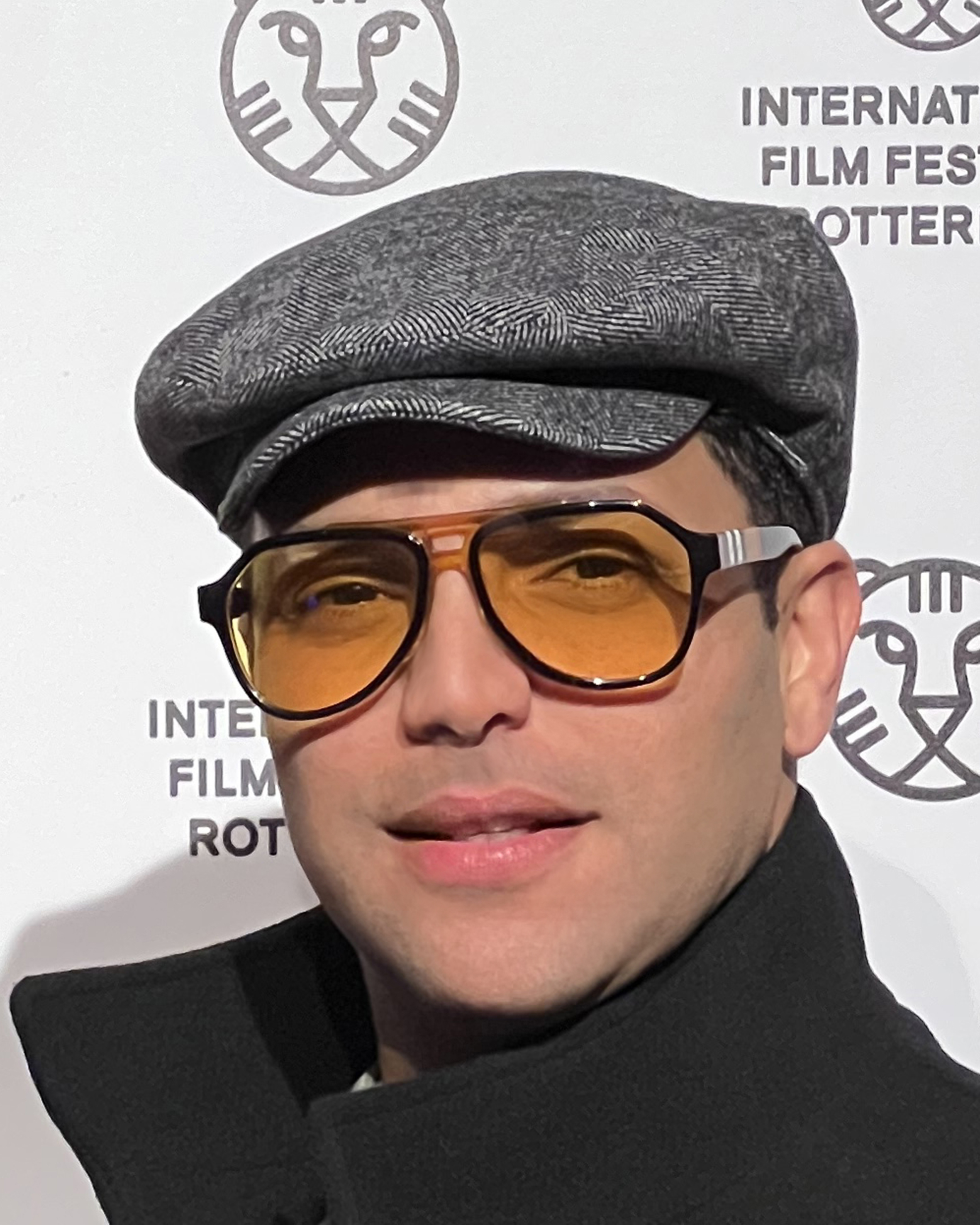
- Soroori at the International Film Festival Rotterdam in 2024
- Born: May 1986 (age 39); Tehran, Iran
- Occupations: Film producer, Theatre producer
- Years active: 1990s–present
- Website: hanifsoroori.com

Hanif Soroori (born May 1986 in Tehran) is an Iranian film and theatre producer, executive producer, and casting director. He has collaborated with several acclaimed Iranian filmmakers, and his works have been screened at international film festivals, including the International Film Festival Rotterdam (IFFR). His film The Old Bachelor won the VPRO Big Screen Award in 2024.

== Biography ==
Soroori was born in Tehran, Iran, in May 1986. He holds a master’s degree in Private Law and is a Ph.D. student in the same field. Alongside his legal studies, he began acting in theatre before moving into film production and project management.

== Career ==
Soroori has worked as producer, executive producer, and line producer in Iranian cinema since the late 1990s. He has collaborated with directors including Dariush Mehrjui, Ebrahim Hatamikia, Azita Hajian, and Oktay Baraheni.

== Selected filmography ==
=== Producer or executive producer ===
Year	Title	Director	Role/Notes
2025	Minds in Between Dreams and Hope	Farnoosh Samadi	Producer
2022–2024	The Old Bachelor	Oktay Baraheni	Producer – Won VPRO Big Screen Award (IFFR 2024)
2019–2020	The Punch-Drunk	Adel Tabrizi	Executive Producer – Winner at Milano FICTS Fest
2019–2024	The Masculine Games	Amin Tabar	Producer
2016	The Rookery	Pejman Teymourtash	Producer & Editor
2023	The Parvin	Mohammadreza Varzi	Line Producer
2016	The New Wave (documentary)	Ahmad Talebinejad	Executive Producer

=== Other roles ===
Year	Title	Director	Role
2015	Bodyguard	Ebrahim Hatamikia	Casting director
2015	Lantouri	Reza Dormishian	Production team
2013	The Apparition	Dariush Mehrjui	Production assistant
2011	The Orange Suit	Dariush Mehrjui	Assistant director

== Theatre ==
Year	Title	Director	Role/Notes
2005	A Man, A Woman	Azita Hajian	Assistant director
1997–1998	Twilight	Azita Hajian	Assistant director
1996–1997	Beyond the Mirror	Azita Hajian	Assistant director

== Festival appearances and awards ==
=== Awards and nominations ===
Year	Award	Festival	Work	Result
2024	Best Film (World Cinema Competition)	Galway Film Fleadh	The Old Bachelor	Won
2024	VPRO Big Screen Award	International Film Festival Rotterdam (IFFR)	The Old Bachelor	Won
2024	Best Performance (Actor: Hassan Pourshirazi)	Transilvania International Film Festival	The Old Bachelor	Won
2024	Transilvania Trophy (Best Film)	Transilvania International Film Festival	The Old Bachelor	Nominated
2022	Best Film (Sports)	Milano International FICTS Fest (40th edition)	The Punch-Drunk	Won
