= Marjaneh Golchin =

Iranian actress (born 1969)

- مرجانه گلچین
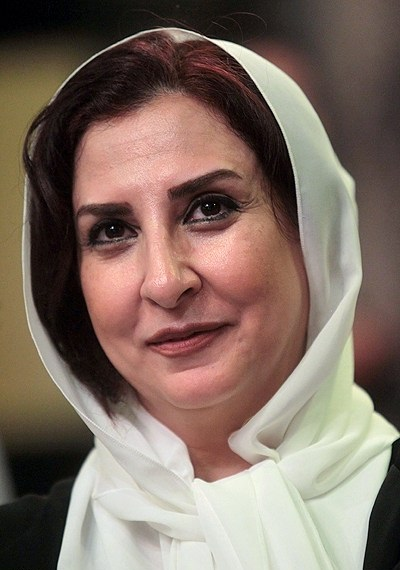
- Marjaneh Golchin during a press conference for Shahgoosh
- Born: February 21, 1969 (age 56); Tehran, Iran
- Occupation: Actress
- Years active: 1985–present

Marjaneh Golchin (born February 21, 1969) is an Iranian actress. She started her career in television and starred in season 1 of “Mirror” directed by Gholamhussein Lotfi in 1985. She is best known for appearances in Shabash by Hamed Kolahdari and in series such as King of Ear by Davood Mirbagheri, Bezangah by Reza Attaran, 3 Dong 3 Dong by Shahed Ahmadlou and Armando directed by Ehsan Abdipoor.

== See also ==
- Iranian women
- Iranian cinema
- Fajr International Film Festival
