= Yekta =

Yekta is originally a Persian female given name meaning 'the only one'. It is also used in Turkish as a given name (mostly) for males. People named Yekta include:

== Given name ==
- Yekta Jamali (born 2004), Iranian weightlifter
- Yekta Kurtuluş (born 1985), Turkish football player
- Yekta Naser (born 1978), Iranian actress
- Yekta Güngör Özden (born 1932), Turkish judge
- Yekta Uzunoğlu (born 1953), Turkish writer
- Yekta Yılmaz Gül (born 1978), Turkish Greco-Roman wrestler

== Last name ==
- Asadollah Yekta (born 1947) Iranian actor
