= Pourandokht Mahiman =

Iranian actress (born 1953)

- پوراندخت مهیمن
- Born: April 4, 1953 (age 73); Isfahan, Iran
- Occupation: Actor
- Years active: 1977–present

Pourandokht Mahiman (Persian: پوراندخت مهیمن; born April 4, 1953 in Isfahan, Iran) is an Iranian actress. She has acted in more than 110 films and series.

She has been given the title of "Khosh Ghadham" and "Kind Mother" of Iranian cinema because of her many roles in movies and serials as a mother. She is considered to be motherly in the cinema towards Mohammad Reza Golzar and considers all the young people of Iran as her children.

== Biography ==
Mahiman's father was an immigrant from Azerbaijan, whose family name was originally Ghazi Ef, which was changed to Mahiman after settling in Iran.

She entered the cinema with the 1977 film Sooteh-Delan, directed by Ali Hatami.

== Selected filmography ==
- 2024 Stranger (TV series)
- 2023: The Investigator (TV series)
- 2021–2022: Island (TV series)
- 2017: Tebyan Stories (TV series)
- 2014: Single 40 years old
- 2012: Ekbatan
- 2010: Khunbaha (TV series)
- 2009: Bee's Sting
- 2007: The Trial directed by Iraj Ghaderi
- 2006: Nargess (TV series)
- 2006: Unfaithful
- 2002: Under the City's Skin (TV series)
- 2001: The Blue
- 2001: Passion of Love directed by Nader Moghaddas
- 2000: Sam and Narges directed by Iraj Ghaderi
- 1985: Mirror (TV series) directed by Gholamhussein Lotfi
- 1977: Sooteh-Delan directed by Ali Hatami
