= The Girl in the Sneakers =

- Directed by: Rasul Sadr Ameli
- Starring: Pegah Ahangarani; Majid Hajizadeh
- Release date: 1999
- Running time: 1h 50min
- Country: Iran
- Language: Persian

The Girl in the Sneakers (Persian: دختری با کفش‌های کتانی) is a 1999 Iranian drama film directed by Rasul Sadr Ameli.

== Cast ==
- Pegah Ahangarani - Tadai
- Majid Hajizadeh - Aideen
- Akram Mohammadi - Mahpareh
- Abdolreza Akbari
