= Loneliness of Leila =

2015 Iranian television series

- Persian: تنهایی لیلا
- Genre: Drama
- Written by: Hamed Angha
- Directed by: Mohammad Hossein Latifi
- Starring: Mina Sadati; Hasan Pourshirazi; Nasrin Moghanloo; Behrouz Shoeibi; Borzou Arjmand; Andishe Fooladvand; Sam Gharibian
- Ending theme: "Loneliness of Leila" by Alireza Ghorbani
- Composer: Karen Homayounfar
- Country of origin: Iran
- Original language: Persian
- No. of seasons: 1
- No. of episodes: 30

Production
- Producer: Mohammad Reza Shafiei
- Editor: Mehdi Joudi
- Running time: 40 minutes

Original release
- Release: 25 July – 1 September 2015

Loneliness of Leila (Persian: تنهایی لیلا, romanized: Tanhaei Leila) is a 2015 Iranian drama television series directed by Mohammad Hossein Latifi and written by Hamed Angha, which aired on IRIB TV3 from 25 July to 1 September 2015 for 30 episodes.

== Plot ==
Leila, a girl from a wealthy and unreligious background gets in love with a religious guy, Mohammad, and puts him in special circumstances and tests his faith. Leila also had a fiancé, but her love for Muhammad completely transforms her and strengthens her faith. She marries Muhammad and has a child together but Muhammad suffers from a previous stroke. He dies and this is the beginning of the story of Leila's problems.

== Cast ==
Mina Sadati as Leila

Hasan Pourshirazi as Khosrow

Nasrin Moghanloo as Nasrin

Behrouz Shoeibi as Mohammad

Borzou Arjmand as Latif

Andishe Fooladvand as Katy

Sam Gharibian as Shayan

Reza Rooygari as Leila's Father

Hassan Joharchi as Leila's Uncle

Ali Salehi as Shayan's Lawyer

Javad Hashemi
