= The Man with Three Thousand Faces =

Iranian television series

- Also known as: Mard-e Se-Hezar-Chehreh
- Persian: مرد سه‌هزارچهره
- Genre: Comedy
- Written by: Mohammad Amin Farshadmehr; Amin Entezari; Ahmadreza Kazemi
- Directed by: Mehran Modiri
- Starring: Mehran Modiri; Pejman Bazeghi; Nasrollah Radesh; Mohammad Bahrani; Behi Jadidi; Gholam Reza Nik-khah; Parvin Ghaem-maghami; Ramin Naser Nasir; Arash Nozari; Farzin Mohades; Morteza Zare
- Country of origin: Iran
- Original language: Persian
- No. of seasons: 1
- No. of episodes: 15

Production
- Producer: Javad Farahani
- Production locations: Tehran, Iran
- Editor: Amir Adibparvar
- Running time: ~50 minutes

Original release
- Network: IRIB TV3
- Release: 4 September 2026 – present

Related
- The Man with a Thousand Faces; The Man with Two Thousand Faces

The Man with Three Thousand Faces (Persian: مرد سه‌هزارچهره) is an Iranian television series and the third installment of The Man with a Thousand Faces television trilogy, directed by Mehran Modiri and produced by Javad Farahani. It began airing on 4 September 2026 on IRIB TV3.

Produced at the commission of the Simafilm Center, the series is a sequel to the successful series The Man with a Thousand Faces (2008) and The Man with Two Thousand Faces (2009). Mehran Modiri once again portrayed the character Masoud Shastchi in the series.

== Plot ==
The series begins with an eighteen-year time jump from the end of the previous series, in which Masoud Shastchi had been exiled to Barareh. Seeking to make up for the years of his life that he has lost, Masoud Shastchi tries to get a job at a government office so that he can help support his father. However, as always, he encounters bad luck, unexpected situations, and humorous incidents, becoming trapped in a new series of mistaken identities and situations.

In this installment, Shastchi finds himself in five or six different situations. One of the most important and sensitive situations he inadvertently becomes involved in concerns the Iran–United States negotiations, giving the story a distinctive political and social satirical dimension. Mehran Modiri has stated that he portrayed Masoud Shastchi in this series inspired by the behavioral characteristics of his own father, whom he described as a calm, respectable, honorable, and gentle man.

== Cast and characters ==
- Mehran Modiri as Masoud Shastchi, the Man of a Thousand Faces.
- Gholamreza NikKhah as Fereydoun Shastchi, Masoud's father.
- Parvin Ghaem-maghami as Mrs. Shastchi, Masoud's mother.
- Pejman Bazeghi as Shahin Etemadi, a police colonel.
- Nasrollah Radesh as Mardani, a police conscript.
- Behi Jadidi as Mahroo Sababehchi, Masoud's fiancée.
- Farzin Mohades as Homayoun, a greenhouse owner and flower seller.
- Ramin Naser Nasir and Arash Nozari as men at the party.
- Mohammad Bahrani as himself, a film and television actor.
- Morteza Zare as the head of a government office.
- Noushin Tabrizi as Somi, Mohammad Bahrani's wife.
- Alireza Mehran as Madurov, the leader of a criminal gang.
- Vahid Aghapour as Taravat, a high-ranking political official.
- Nader Soleimani as a confectioner
- Vafa Eskandari as Ziba
- Tino Salehi as Behrouz
- Mohammad Taherkhani as Jamshid
- Majid Jouzani as Osouli
- Mohsen Hosseini as a well-known producer
- Shahram Safavi as a translator
- Kaveh Marhamati as Madurov's assistant
- Meysam Abdi as a court clerk

== Production ==
Pre-production on the series began in October 2025, and filming began in December 2025. Production was halted after six episodes had been completed due to the outbreak of the 2026 Iran war. Filming of the remaining nine episodes resumed in May 2026. Filming was completed in July 2026, after which post-production and editing began.

=== Development and pre-production ===
The idea for producing the third season, titled The Man with Three Thousand Faces, emerged following a year of negotiations between Mehran Modiri and the Simafilm Center. Mehdi Naghuian, head of the Simafilm Center, stated that Modiri had developed distinctive ideas and situations for the series, turning it into a major production project. Unlike previous seasons, which were written by writers including Peyman Ghasemkhani, Mehrab Ghasemkhani, and Amir Mahdi Jule, this season uses a new writing team consisting of Mohammad Amin Farshadmehr, Ahmadreza Kazemi, and Amin Entezari. The absence of the previous writing team led to reactions and speculation among critics regarding changes in the series' tone and the quality of its comedy.

=== Filming ===
Pre-production and filming of the series began before the broadcast of Shish Maheh. Filming was temporarily halted due to the country's circumstances and the outbreak of war, but resumed after a period of time. The series was produced in approximately 15 episodes, and according to Simafilm officials, all the necessary resources for producing a high-quality work were made available to the production team.

== Broadcast ==
The Man with Three Thousand Faces was initially scheduled to air as Nowruz programming on IRIB TV3 in 2026, but its broadcast was canceled due to the tense political circumstances and a period of public mourning. Eventually, after filming and editing were completed, it was announced that the series would be added to the broadcast schedule after the end of the month of Safar. On 4 September 2026, the series began airing weekly on Fridays.
