= Be Vaghte Talagh =

2018 Iranian film

- Directed by: Hassan Hajgozar
- Written by: Saeed Roustayi
- Produced by: Peyman Rad
- Starring: Pouria Poursorkh; khatereh hatami; Ramin Parchami; Reza Rooygari; Parastoo Salehi; Farajolah Golsefidi; Mohsen Iraji
- Cinematography: Saeed Barati
- Release date: 2018
- Running time: 95 minutes
- Country: Iran
- Language: Persian

Be Vaghte Talagh (Persian: به وقت طلاق) is a film 2018 written and directed by Hassan Hajgozar.

== Plot ==
Cold and childless houses, beyond the splendor of a dream, rain falls, couples and cold houses are fighting over rain in the rain. Shahrokh is satisfied and the butterfly is upset, the story there, the dream hotel, takes everyone with it, now the butterfly is satisfied with the rain and Shahrokh is unhappy on the verge of deception whether the rain comes or not, depending on the border he made and paid...

== Cast ==
- Pouria Poursorkh
- khatereh hatami
- Ramin Parchami
- Reza Rooygari
- Parastoo Salehi
- Farajolah Golsefidi
- Mohsen Iraji
