= Faza Navardan =

- فضانوردان
- Written by: Peyman Ghasemkhani; Siamak Ansari; Mehrab Ghasemkhani; Amir Mahdi Jule
- Directed by: Siamak Ansari; Peyman Ghasemkhani
- Starring: Mohammad Reza Hedayati; Siamak Ansari; Shaghayegh Dehghan; Reza Shafiei Jam; Nasrollah Radesh; Mohammad Shiri; Falamak Joneidi; Hadi Kazemi
- Country of origin: Iran
- Original language: Persian

Production
- Producers: Majid Aghagolian; Hamid Aghagolian
- Running time: 45 minutes

Original release
- Release: December 2006 – August 2008

Faza Navardan (Persian: فضانوردان, lit. 'Astronauts') is an Iranian television series directed by Iranian actors Siamak Ansari and Peyman Ghasemkhani. The word Faza Navardan is the plural form of Faza-Navard, meaning astronaut in Persian.

== Plot ==
The DVD does not stick to one plot. It is made up of different short films that involve comedy or different events happening.

== Release ==
Part I was released in December 2006 and Part II of the series released in early 2008. The third and fourth installments are now complete and Part III was released in August 2008.

In an interview with an Iranian magazine in 2008, Ansari dismissed reports that The Faza Navardan cast will definitely not be returning for a fifth installment. However, he confirmed that the "situation with the series is unpredictable and anything could happen. Peyman and I are very much in favour of returning for a fifth installment but there are certain issues that need to be resolved before work can begin preparation for the fifth installment."

== Cast ==
- Mohammad-Reza Hedayati
- Siamak Ansari
- Shaghayegh Dehghan
- Reza Shafiei Jam
- Nasrollah Radesh
- Mohamed Shiri
- Falamak Joneidi
- Hadi Kazemi
