= Amir Parvin Hosseini =

Iranian film producer

- امیر پروین حسینی
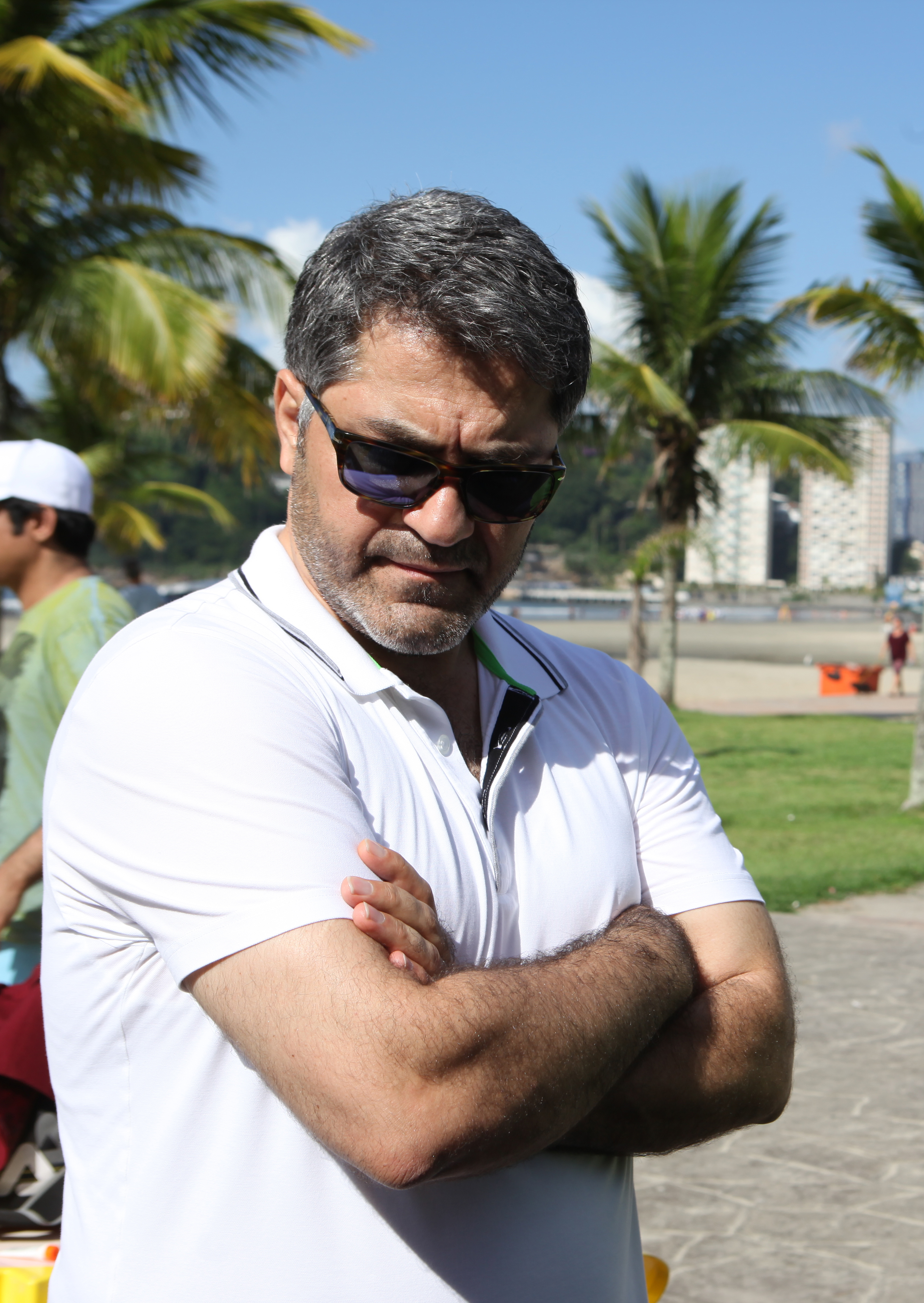
- Amir Parvin Hosseini in Brazil
- Born: Tehran, Iran
- Occupations: Film producer, writer, screenwriter
- Years active: 1999–present

Amir Parvin Hosseini is an Iranian film and television producer and industry executive known for developing and executing international co-productions across four continents. His most notable work includes the Iran–Brazil co-production I Am Not Salvador (2016), produced under his leadership and screened in multiple markets including Canada, Germany, and Turkey. He has also received recognition at international film festivals and awards ceremonies.

== Career ==
Amir Parvin Hosseini is a film and television producer and executive known for developing and managing international co-productions. His work includes projects filmed across South America, Asia, and Europe, with collaborations in countries such as Brazil, China, Afghanistan, the United Arab Emirates, Lebanon, France, Germany, and Turkey.

He produced some of Iran’s most commercially successful films, including I Am Not Salvador (2016), an Iran–Brazil co-production shot on location in South America. His films have been released in international markets, including theatrical runs in Canada and Germany.

In addition to production, Hosseini has held leadership roles within the Iranian film industry, serving as chairman of the board for the Association of Iranian Filmmaking Organizations.

== Filmography ==
Year	Title (English)	Original Title (Persian)	Type
2025	Two Faces of Autumn	«دو روی پاییز»	Feature film
2024	Don't Be Embarrassed 2	«خجالت نکش ۲»	Feature film + Home video series
2023	Soraya	«ثریا»	Short film
2022	Gladiators	«گلادیاتورها»	Short film
2022	Made in Iran 3	«ساخت ایران ۳»	Home video series
2018	Don’t Be Embarrassed	«خجالت نکش»	Feature film
2018	Time To Change	«وقت تغییر»	Short film
2018	Made in Iran 2	«ساخت ایران ۲»	Home video series
2017	Wing Mirror	«آینه بغل»	Feature film
2016	Zapas	«زاپاس»	Feature film
2016	I Am Not Salvador	«من سالوادور نیستم»	Feature film
2013	Soil and Coral	«خاک و مرجان»	Feature film
2011	Made in Iran 1	«ساخت ایران»	Home video series
2010	Mind Your Manners	«اخلاقتو خوب کن»	Feature film
2010	Rich and Poor	«دارا و ندار»	TV series
2009	Do Not Turn, Please	«لطفاً دور نزنیم»	TV series
2008	Moonlight Secret	«راز مهتاب»	Feature film
1999	The Flight	«پرواز»	Feature film

== Awards ==
Year	Award / Festival	Category	Work
2024	FFTG Awards	Grand Jury Award	Soraya
2023	Flow Film Festival	Best Foreign Film	Gladiators
2019	Canada International Film Festival	Rising Star Award	Don't Be Embarrassed
2019	Aprilia Film Festival	Best Short Film	Time To Change
2019	Corteggiando Vimondrona Film Festival	Best Short Film	Time To Change
2018	Fajr Film Festival	Best First Film	Don't Be Embarrassed (Khejalat nakesh)
2016	Asia Rainbow TV Awards	Best Producer in Asia	Zapas
2016	Hollywood Boulevard Film Festival	Best Foreign Feature Producer	Zapas
2016	Canadian Diversity Film Festival	Best Feature Film	Zapas
2016	Jasmin International Film Festival	Best Producer	Made in Iran
2013	International Film Festival for Peace, Inspiration and Equality	Award of Excellence Filmmaker of Peace	Soil and Coral
2008	JameJam Film Festival	Best Producer	Do Not Turn, Please
