= Hasan Pourshirazi =

Iranian actor (born 1957)

- حسن پورشیرازی
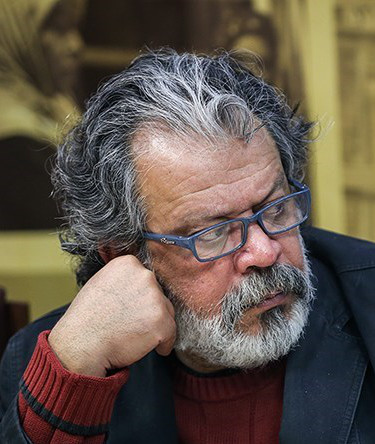
- Pourshirazi in 2016
- Born: April 5, 1958 (age 68); Shiraz, Fars, Iran
- Occupation: Actor
- Years active: 1983–present
- Spouse: Mahnaz Afzali (m.)
- Children: 2

Hasan Pourshirazi (Persian: حسن پورشیرازی; born March 1, 1958) is an Iranian actor. He received critical acclaim for his performances in films Mom's Guest (2004), The White Meadows (2009), The Oath (2019), and The Old Bachelor (2024).

== Early life ==
Hasan Pourshirazi was born on April 5, 1958, in Shiraz, Fars, Iran.

== Filmography ==
=== Film ===
Year	Title	Role	Director	Notes	Ref(s)
2001	Killing Mad Dogs	Sergeant Naghmeh	Bahram Beyzaee		
2004	Mom's Guest	Yadollah	Dariush Mehrjui		
2006	Half Moon	Police officer	Bahman Ghobadi		
2007	The Music Man	Addict	Dariush Mehrjui		
2009	The White Meadows	Rahmat	Mohammad Rasoulof		
2011	Goodbye		Mohammad Rasoulof		
2013	Good to Be Back	Najib	Dariush Mehrjui		
2013	Ashi-Mashi, the Little Sparrow	Hadi	Vahid Nikkhahazad		
2014	Hussein, Who Said No	Umar ibn Sa'd	Ahmad Reza Darvish		
2017	Maybe It Wasn't Love		Saeed Ebrahimifar		
2018	The Last Fiction	Jamshid / Mardas (voice)	Ashkan Rahgozar	Animation	
2019	The Oath	Khalil	Mohsen Tanabandeh		
2020	Slaughterhouse	Abed	Abbas Amini		
2020	180° Rule	Sara's father	Farnoosh Samadi		
2022	Cue Ball	Javid	Majid Salehi		
2023	Around 8 AM	Mr. Misaghi	Manouchehr Hadi		
2024	The Old Bachelor	Gholam Bastani	Oktay Baraheni		
2025	Woman and Child		Saeed Roustaee		
TBA	Love in Solitary		Masoud Kimiai		

=== Web ===
Year	Title	Role	Director	Platform	Notes	Ref(s)
2023	The Demon and the Forehead Moon	Baba Abrishami	Hossein Ghena'at	Filmnet, Filimo	Main role; season 1	
2023	The Black Hole	Jamshid Khodabandeh	Hossein Namazi	Filmnet	Main role	
TBA	The Notorious		Ehsan Sajjadi Hosseini		Main role	

=== Television ===
- 2017 Legionnaire
- 2015 Loneliness of Leila
- 2010 Mokhtarnameh
- 2008 Nardebam-e Aseman
- 2006 Nargess
- 2002 Under the City's Skin
- 1990 Barbershop Ziba (TV series)
