= Reza Rooygari =

Iranian actor and singer (1946–2026)

- رضا رویگری
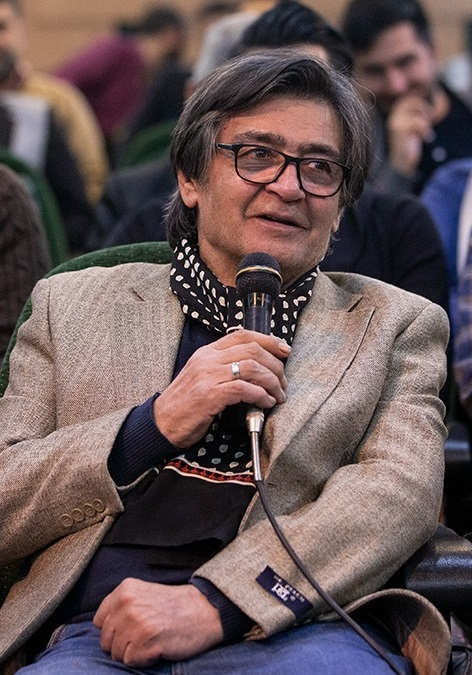
- Born: 27 December 1946; Tehran, Iran
- Died: 21 January 2026 (aged 79); Tehran, Iran
- Occupations: Actor, singer, painter
- Years active: 1970–2015

Reza Rooygari (Persian: رضا رویگری, also Romanized as Rezā Rūygarī; 27 December 1946 – 21 January 2026) was an Iranian actor, singer and painter. He appeared in films such as The Tenants (1987), Sahar, My Daughter (1990) and The Quiet Home (1993). Rooygari died from a heart attack in Tehran on 21 January 2026, at the age of 79.

== Partial filmography ==
=== Film ===
- Eagles (1985)
- The Tenants (1987)
- Sahar, My Daughter (1990)
- Coin (2014)
- Be Vaghte Talagh (2018)
- Dookhtaran Ham Mimirand (2019)
- The Old Bachelor (2024)

=== Television ===
- Rich and Poor
- Mokhtarnameh
- Yek Santimetr Ta Labkhand
- Loneliness of Leila
- King of Ear
