= The Old Bachelor (film) =

Iranian film by Oktay Baraheni

- Theatrical release poster
- Directed by: Oktay Baraheni
- Written by: Oktay Baraheni
- Produced by: Babak Hamidian; Hanif Sarvari
- Starring: Hasan Pourshirazi; Leila Hatami; Hamed Behdad; Mohammad Valizadegan
- Cinematography: Adib Sobhani
- Edited by: Reza Shahbazi
- Music by: Hesam Naseri
- Distributed by: Amerian Film; Filmiran
- Release date: January 31, 2024 (Rotterdam)
- Running time: 192 minutes
- Country: Iran
- Language: Persian
- Box office: $1.17 million

The Old Bachelor (Persian: پیرپسر, romanized: Pir Pesar) is a 2024 Iranian drama film written and directed by Oktay Baraheni. Starring Hasan Pourshirazi, Leila Hatami, Hamed Behdad and Mohammad Valizadegan, it premiered at the 53rd International Film Festival Rotterdam, where it won the VPRO Big Screen Award.

== Plot ==
Gholam Bastani lives in an old two-story house with his two sons, Ali and Reza, without any mother figure in the home. Each son has a different mother, and now that they are approaching middle age, they are eager to persuade their father to sell the house. But Gholam—a drug addict and womanizer—avoids the subject at every turn. He prioritizes pleasure and indulgence over his children’s future, spending most of his days wandering the streets aimlessly or hanging out at his friend Ghamkhar’s junk shop. Ali works as a bookseller but loses his job due to conflicts with a colleague, while Reza is employed at a real estate agency.

Despite having substantial wealth, Gholam keeps his sons in financial strain. Ali and Reza hope to profit from selling and renovating the house, but Gholam refuses. Frustrated, Reza even fantasizes about killing his father, openly sharing his plan with Ali without hesitation.

One day, Gholam encounters a young woman named Rana at Ghamkhar’s shop, where she is searching for a place to rent. He brings her to his home, offering her the upstairs apartment at a reduced rent due to her financial situation. Gholam becomes infatuated with her and soon announces to his sons that he plans to marry her. Unaware of his intentions, Rana settles into her new apartment.

Tensions rise during a dinner when Gholam, Ali, and Reza are all present. Rana realizes the true nature of Gholam’s desires through the conversation. Meanwhile, an unexpected attraction develops between Ali and Rana. Ali tries to convince his father to leave her alone, but Gholam refuses to relent. At Ghamkhar’s suggestion, Gholam attempts to seduce Rana with a large sum of cash. She angrily rejects him but refuses to return the money.

Ali and Rana spend a night together outside the house, deepening their bond. When Gholam orders Ali to leave the house, Ali refuses, claiming it belonged to his mother. Despite warnings to stay away from Rana, Ali resists. The rivalry between father and son intensifies, with both competing for Rana’s attention. Gholam spends a night upstairs with her and later celebrates at Ghamkhar’s shop, boasting about his actions.

Feeling a lack of privacy, Rana returns to her parents’ home. Ali confronts her to clarify what happened that night. She explains that although Gholam insisted on staying, he did nothing, and she simply went to her room to sleep. Furious at Gholam’s claims, she attempts to return the money he offered, but Gholam refuses and escalates by abducting her, insisting on intimacy. Rana resists, stating her love for Ali.

After Rana disappears, Ali searches desperately, convinced that Gholam has harmed her. When confronted, Gholam repeatedly denies knowing her whereabouts. One night, Ali and Reza take all of Gholam’s drugs and lock the house. Upon discovering this, Gholam attacks his sons, confessing to raping and killing Rana. He further reveals that Reza is not his biological son, blaming him on his mother’s infidelity, which he claims he punished by killing her. In the ensuing struggle, Gholam stabs Ali and suffocates Reza. Ali retaliates and fatally stabs Gholam. In the end, all three die in the violent confrontation.

== Cast ==
- Hasan Pourshirazi as Gholam Bastani
- Leila Hatami as Ra'nā
- Hamed Behdad as Ali Bastani
- Mohammad Valizadegan as Reza Bastani
- Mohammad Reza Davoodnezhad
- Babak Hamidian
- Reza Rouygari
- Fahimeh Rahimnia
- Vahid Ghazi Zahedi
- Ali Rahimi
- Hazhir Sam
- Vahid Rahmati
- Shaghayegh Faryadshiran
- Arash Aghabeik
- Mahsa Bagheri
- Meysam Ghanizadeh
- Mehri Kazemi
- Azar Mohammadi
- Mohammad Berenjpour
- Gholam Ali Rezaee
- Abbas Parniani
