= Parichehr Moshrefi =

Iranian actress

- پریچهر مشرفی
- Born: August 28, 1987 (age 38); Tehran, Iran
- Occupation: Actor
- Years active: 2008–present

Parichehr Moshrefi (Persian: پریچهر مشرفی) is an Iranian actress born on August 28, 1987, in Tehran, Iran.

== Biography ==
She was born in Tehran and was born in an artistic family.She has a degree in graphic design and at first she was a photographer and then went to the theater and then went to the cinema and television. She suffered a lot of hardships to achieve her acting goals in cinema.Moshrefi entered the cinema with the movie Single 40 years old, But the height of her fame was in the Romance series.

== Selected filmography ==
- 2023: Nakhandeh
- 2023: Murder Number 9
- 2022: Cold Fire (TV series)
- 2022: Threesome Loneliness
- 2017: Romance (TV series)
- 2017: Legionnaire (TV series)
- 2017: Tebyan Stories (TV series)
- 2014: Single 40 years old
- 2014: Bandar Abbas
- 2009: Turn on your bluetooth

== See also ==
- Iranian cinema
- Persian women
