= Parastoo Golestani =

Iranian actress

- پرستو گلستانی
- Born: June 1, 1971 (age 54); Tehran, Iran
- Other name: Parastoo E'etemad Golestani
- Occupation: Actress
- Years active: 1985–present
- Spouse: Behrouz Baghaei (divorced)

Parastoo Golestani (Persian: پرستو گلستانی; born 1971) is an Iranian actress.

== Biography ==
Parastoo Golestani was born 1971 in Tehran. She is niece of Mehdi Akhavan-Sales, an Iranian poet. She is divorced from Behrooz Baghaei.

She attended Islamic Azad University where she received a bachelor's degree in acting and directing.

Golestani won the best actress award at the 17th Fajr International Film Festival in 1999.

== Filmography ==
- Pedar Salar
- Dani and I (Persian: Dani va Man)
- A Day and An Eagle (Persian: Roozi va Oghabi)
- Man of Many Faces (TV series) (Persian: Marde Hezar Chehreh)
