= Unfaithful (2006 film) =

- Persian: بی‌وفا
- Directed by: Asghar Naimi
- Written by: Farhad Tohidi
- Produced by: Yadollah Shahidi
- Starring: Hamid Goodarzi; Elnaz Shakerdoost; Alireza Jafari; Gohar Kheirandish; Falamak Joneidi; Mohammad-Reza Hedayati; Pourandokht Mahiman; Mohsen GhaziMoradi; Mahvash Vaghari; Parvin Meykadeh
- Cinematography: Reza Banki
- Edited by: Kaveh Imani
- Music by: Saeed Ansari
- Distributed by: Arya Film
- Release date: 22 November 2006
- Running time: 90 Min
- Country: Iran
- Language: Persian

Unfaithful (Persian: بی‌وفا ; Bi vafa) is a 2006 Iranian Comedy,Romance film directed by Asghar Naimi.

== Plot ==
Ramin (Hamid Goodarzi) and Zohreh (Elnaz Shakerdoost), each belonging to a different social class, unintentionally find themselves together on a common path, which leads to their connection and conflicts for Ramin.

== Cast ==
- Hamid Goodarzi as Ramin
- Elnaz Shakerdoost as Zohreh
- Alireza Jafari as Javad
- Gohar Kheirandish as Atti
- Falamak Joneidi as Parisa
- Mohammad-Reza Hedayati as Behrooz
- Pourandokht Mahiman as Pouran
- Mohsen GhaziMoradi as Father of Zohreh
- Mahvash Vaghari as Mother of Parisa
- Parvin Meykadeh as Landlord
- Sahar Reyhani
- Simon Simonian
