= Romance (Iranian TV series) =

2017 Iranian television series

- Persian: عاشقانه
- Genre: Crime, Romance
- Written by: Saeed Jalali; Alireza Kazemipour
- Directed by: Manouchehr Hadi
- Starring: Mohammad Reza Golzar; Sareh Bayat; Mahnaz Afshar; Hossein Yari; Bahareh Kianafshar; Pantea Bahram; Houman Seyyedi; Hamid Reza Pegah; Farzad Farzin; Parichehr Moshrefi; Masoud Rayegan
- Composer: Babak Zarin
- Country of origin: Iran
- Original language: Persian
- No. of seasons: 1
- No. of episodes: 17

Production
- Producers: Houman Kabiri; Mahdi Golestaneh
- Production location: Tehran
- Cinematography: Iman Habibi
- Editors: Movahhed Shadrou; Amirali Ashouri
- Running time: 45–50 minutes

Original release
- Release: 13 February – 28 July 2017

Romance (Persian: عاشقانه;Asheghaneh) is a 2017 Iranian crime romance TV series directed by Manouchehr Hadi.

== Storyline ==
A woman named Gisoo Barazande (Mahnaz Afshar) enters the lives of several young couples, so that the apparent peace of their lives is thrown into chaos, and following the loss of the Pegah's dog (Popet) during the trip to the north, problems arise between two young couples named Soheil (Mohammed Reza Golzar) and it creates Pegah (Sareh Bayat).

== Cast ==
- Mohammad Reza Golzar as Soheil
- Sareh Bayat as Pegah
- Mahnaz Afshar as Gisoo
- Hossein Yari as Reza
- Bahareh Kianafshar as Dorsa
- Pantea Bahram as Reyhaneh
- Houman Seyyedi as Peyman
- Parichehr Moshrefi as Parisa
- Masoud Rayegan as Younes
- Farzad Farzin as Tooraj / Farzad Farzin
- Hamid Reza Pegah as Damoon Tehrani
- Sara Rasoulzadeh as Hedieh
- Yekta Naser as Leila
- Azadeh Riazi as Mona
- Shamsi Fazlollahi as Mahin
- Bahareh Rahnama as Afra
- Hanieh Tavassoli as Katayoun
- Alireza Soozanchi as Mahmood
- Hamraz Akbari as Dena
- Alireza Zamani Nasab as Mohsen
