= Saghar Azizi =

Iranian actress (born 1977)

- Born: June 30, 1977 (age 48); Shiraz, Pahlavi Iran
- Occupation: Actress
- Years active: 1999–present

Saghar Azizi (Persian: ساغر عزیزی, romanized: Sāghar ʻAzīzī; born June 30, 1977) is an Iranian actress of film, television and theater. She is known as playing the role of Farah Pahlavi in the historical drama television series, The Enigma of the Shah (2014–2016).

== Life and career ==
Saghar Azizi was born on June 30, 1977 in Shiraz, Imperial State of Iran. She studied film directing at Soore University in Tehran, but entered the field as an actress by first appearing in the Iranian film Rang e Shab (English: The Color of Night) (2000) by director Mohammad Ali Sadjadi. This was followed by appearing in Euthanasia (2001) by director Rahman Rezaei.

== Filmography ==
=== Film ===
- 2000: The Color of the Night, as a "fashionable girl"
- 2001: Euthanasia (film)
- 2002: Thirst

=== Television series ===
- 2002: Innocence Lost (2002 TV series)
- 2010: The Years of Constitution, as Ezzat ed-Dowleh
- 2010: Foggy Tabriz, as Maryam
- 2014–2016: The Enigma of the Shah, as Shahbanu Farah Pahlavi
- 2017: Legionnaire as Foroogh
