= Tebyan Stories =

2017 Iranian television drama series

- Persian: قصه های تبیان
- Genre: Drama
- Written by: Mehdi Mesgaran
- Directed by: Ali Nasr; Mohammad Bayati; Sajjad Ghafelebashi; Abbas Saleh Madresei; Siamak Mokhtari; Saeed Naghdzadeh; Pejman Nematpour; Mohammad Hojat Zijoudi
- Starring: Mohammad Mokhtari; Jalil Farjad; Mina Jafarzadeh; Pourandokht Mahiman; Alireza Osivand; Afshin Sangchap; Niloofar Shahidi; Ramin Rastad; Siavosh Tahmoures; Parichehr Moshrefi; Mojtaba Shafiei; Farajollah Golsefidi; Reza Tavakoli; Elham Tahmouri
- Composers: Mohammad Fereshteh Nezhad; Mehdi Hosseini
- Country of origin: Iran
- Original language: Persian
- No. of seasons: 1
- No. of episodes: 37

Production
- Producer: Farajollah Salahshoor
- Cinematography: Mehdi Amiri; Hasan Asadi; Ali Azim Zadeh Tehrani; Hossein Nazerian
- Editors: Reza Shahbazi; Hossein Zandbaf; Shooka Zandbaf; Hesamodin Zarif
- Running time: 45 minutes

Original release
- Network: IRIB TV5
- Release: 30 January – 15 March 2017

Tebyan Stories (Persian: قصه های تبیان) is an Iranian television drama series from 2017. All stories in this series are based on real events.

== Cast ==
- Mohammad Mokhtari
- Jalil Farjad
- Mina Jafarzadeh
- Pourandokht Mahiman
- Alireza Osivand
- Afshin Sangchap
- Niloofar Shahidi
- Ramin Rastad
- Siavosh Tahmoures
- Parichehr Moshrefi
- Mojtaba Shafiei
- Farajollah Golsefidi
- Reza Tavakoli
- Elham Tahmouri
- Amir Safiri
- Mozhgan Taraneh
- Babak Vali
- Hamid Sharifzadeh
- Nasrin Geramipour
- Ali Javidfar
- Parviz Fallahi Pour
- Manoochehr Alipoor
- Sepideh Pahlavanzadeh
- Mina Noruzi
- Abbas Moradi
- Salman Farkhondeh
- Moharam Haghpanah
