= The Man with a Thousand Faces =

Iranian comedy television series

- Also known as: Man of Many Faces; Mard-e Hezar Chehreh
- Persian: مرد هزارچهره
- Genre: Comedy
- Written by: Peyman Ghasem Khani; Mehrab Ghasem Khani; Amir Mahdi Jule; Khasayar Alvand
- Directed by: Mehran Modiri
- Starring: Mehran Modiri; Parviz Fallahipoor; Ali Reza Khamseh; Javad Ezati; Pejman Bazeghi; Reza Feiz Noroozi; Rasoul Najafian; Siamak Ansari; Akram Mohammadi; Parastoo Golestani; Saed Hedayati; Saeid Pirdoost; Nader Soleimani; Soroush Sehhat; Shaghayegh Dehghan; Falamak Joneidi; Nasrollah Radesh; Mokhtar Saeghi; Bahareh Rahnama; Esmail Soltanian; Amir Mahdi Jule; Ramin Pouriman; Gholamreza Nik-khah; Parvin Ghaem-Maghami
- Country of origin: Iran
- Original language: Persian
- No. of seasons: 1
- No. of episodes: 13

Production
- Producers: Hamid Aghagolian; Majid Aghagolian; Ali Reza Mazinani
- Production locations: Tehran, Iran
- Editor: Javad Aslani
- Running time: 45 minutes

Original release
- Network: IRIB TV3
- Release: 20 March – 2 April 2008

Related
- The Man with Two Thousand Faces; The Man with Three Thousand Faces

The Man with a Thousand Faces or Man of Many Faces (Persian: مرد هزارچهره) is an Iranian comedy television series created for the channel IRIB TV3. It was directed by Mehran Modiri, who also stars as the lead character Masoud Shastchi. It features much of the cast of Mozaffar's Garden, a series made earlier by Modiri. The Man with Two Thousand Faces is a sequel to this series.

13 episodes of the series aired on IRIB TV3 from 20 March to 2 April 2008. The complete collection of episodes was later released on home media in a box set of three DVD discs.

== Cast ==
- Mehran Modiri as Masoud Shastchi
- Parviz Fallahipoor as Dr. Tabibian
- Ali Reza Khamseh as Ghazzaghemandian (Farhang)
- Pejman Bazeghi as Shahin Etemadi
- Shaghayegh Dehghan as shahin's wife
- Reza Feiz Noroozi as Mr Jandaghi
- Siamak Ansari as Dr Soheil Tabibian
- Rasoul Najafian as Maestro Kharab
- Akram Mohammadi as Ziba
- Parastoo Golestani as Soheila Tabibian
- Falamak Joneidi as Sahar Jandaghi
- Gholam Reza Nik-khah as Masoud's father
- Amir Mahdi Hasani as Bikerman
- Parvin Ghaem-maghami as Masoud's mother
- Saed Hedayati as Judge
