= 180° Rule (film) =

2020 Iranian film by Farnoosh Samadi

- Film poster
- Directed by: Farnoosh Samadi
- Written by: Farnoosh Samadi
- Produced by: Ali Mosaffa
- Starring: Sahar Dolatshahi; Pejman Jamshidi; Azita Hajian; Hasan Pourshirazi
- Cinematography: Masoud Salami
- Edited by: Meisam Molaee
- Music by: Peyman Yazdanian
- Production company: Ali Mosaffa Productions
- Distributed by: Pluto Film Distribution Network GmbH
- Release date: September 10, 2020 (TIFF)
- Running time: 83 minutes
- Country: Iran
- Language: Persian

180° Rule (Persian: خط فرضی, romanized: Khatt-e farzi) is a 2020 Iranian drama film directed and written by Farnoosh Samadi, starring Sahar Dolatshahi, Pejman Jamshidi, Azita Hajian and Hasan Pourshirazi. The film premiered at the 2020 Toronto International Film Festival.

The film received two nominations at the 39th Fajr Film Festival.

== Premise ==
Sara, along with her husband Hamed and their young daughter, is invited to a wedding in northern Iran. However, Hamed cannot make the trip due to work obligations, which sets off a series of events that drastically change Sara's life.

== Cast ==
- Sahar Dolatshahi as Sara
- Pejman Jamshidi as Hamed
- Azita Hajian as Sara's mother
- Hasan Pourshirazi
- Bahman Taghizadeh
- Sadaf Asgari
- Amirreza Ranjbaran as Sara's brother
- Mohammad Heidari
- Navid Bani
- Katayoun Salki
- Nava Nemati

== Reception ==
=== Critical response ===
On review aggregator website Rotten Tomatoes, 64% of 14 reviews are positive for the film, with an average rating of 6.1/10.

=== Accolades ===
Year	Award	Category	Recipient	Result	Ref.
2021	Beirut International Women Film Festival	Best Foreign Language Feature Film	Farnoosh Samadi	Won	
2021	Beirut International Women Film Festival	Best International Ensemble Cast	Sahar Dolatshahi, Pejman Jamshidi, Azita Hajian, Hassan Pourshirazi	Won	
2021	Cyprus Film Days International Festival	Best Film	Farnoosh Samadi	Nominated	
2021	Fajr Film Festival	Best Actress in a Supporting Role	Azita Hajian	Nominated	
2021	Fajr Film Festival	Best Sound Effects	Amir Hossein Ghasemi	Nominated	
2020	London Film Festival	Audience Award for Best Narrative Feature	Farnoosh Samadi	Nominated	
2020	Toronto International Film Festival	Best Film – Discovery Section	Farnoosh Samadi	Nominated	
2020	Valladolid International Film Festival	Best Feature Film – Meeting Point	Farnoosh Samadi	Won	
