= Under the City's Skin (TV series) =

2001 series directed by Mehran Ghafourian

- Persian: زیر آسمان شهر
- Genre: Comedy
- Written by: Reza Attaran; Soroush Sehhat; Bahman Motamedian; Hamid Barzegar
- Directed by: Mehran Ghafourian
- Starring: Mehran Ghafourian; Hamid Lolayi; Akbar Abdi; Majid Salehi; Kiumars Malekmotei; Malakeh Ranjbar; Parastoo Salehi; Yousef Teymouri; Kamran Malekmotei; Ashkan Eshtiyagh; Aram Jafari; Bijan Banafshekhah; Nasrollah Radesh; Hasan Pourshirazi; Akram Mohammadi; Masoomeh Karimi; Reza Zhian; Mina Jafarzadeh; Reza Fayazi; Reza Attaran; Ali Ansarian; Sanaz Samavati; Borzou Arjmand; Pourandokht Mahiman; Ghazal Saremi; Pejman Bazeghi; Ebrahim Abadi; Gholamhussein Lotfi; Behnoosh Bakhtiari; Shahab Abbasi; Mehdi Sabaei; Mehri Mehrnia
- Theme music composer: Amir Tajik
- Composer: Mehdi Ghafourian
- Country of origin: Iran
- Original language: Persian
- No. of seasons: 3
- No. of episodes: 222

Production
- Producers: Mehran Ghafourian; Nader Kashani
- Production location: Tehran
- Cinematography: Ali Shahroodi
- Editor: Mehdi Mazloumi
- Running time: 45 - 50 minutes

Original release
- Release: 22 June 2001 – 16 September 2002

Under the City's Sky (Persian: زیر آسمان شهر) is an Iranian comedy series, directed by Mehran Ghafourian. The series is made in three seasons between June 22, 2001 and September 16, 2002.

== About the series ==
This series was made in 90 episodes after the end of the first season and due to the great reception, the second season was made in 42 episodes. But the third season with 107 episodes was not successful, so the fourth season was not made.

== Storyline ==
In this series, in the form of a humorous narrative, the lives of different strata of the city are depicted together. The whole story takes place from the beginning in an apartment where several neighbors live.

== Cast ==
- Mehran Ghafourian
- Hamid Lolayi
- Akbar Abdi
- Majid Salehi
- Kiumars Malekmotei
- Malakeh Ranjbar
- Parastoo Salehi
- Yousef Teymouri
- Kamran Malekmotei
- Ashkan Eshtiyagh
- Aram Jafari
- Bijan Banafshekhah
- Nasrollah Radesh
- Hasan Pourshirazi
- Akram Mohammadi
- Masoomeh Karimi
- Reza Zhian
- Mina Jafarzadeh
- Pourandokht Mahiman
- Reza Fayazi
- Reza Attaran
- Ali Ansarian
- Sanaz Samavati
- Borzou Arjmand
- Ghazal Saremi
- Pejman Bazeghi
- Ebrahim Abadi
- Gholamhussein Lotfi
- Behnoosh Bakhtiari
- Shahab Abbasi
- Mehdi Sabaei
- Mehri Mehrnia
- Mahmood Banafshehkhah
- Reza Banafshehkhah
- Sharareh Doroshti
- Mohsen Ghazi Moradi
- Shiva Boloorian
- Gholam Reza NikKhah
- Parviz Shafi Zadeh
- Amirhosein Modares
- Farahnaz Manafi Zaher
- Parvin Meykade
- Khashayar Rad
- Amir Ghaffarmanesh
- Ali Lakpourian
- Fakhreddin Seddigh Sharif
- Ramin Naser Nasir
- Siavash Mofidi
- Ramin Parchami
- Jafar Bozorgi
- Hassan Zare
- Mehran Zeighami
- Hossein Shahab
- Ramin Nemati
- Ali Osivand
