= Legionnaire (TV series) =

Iranian Comedy TV series

- Persian: لژیونر
- Genre: Comedy
- Written by: Peyman Abbasi
- Directed by: Masoud Abparvar
- Starring: Hasan Pourshirazi; Mohammad-Reza Sharifinia; Zahir Yari; Helia Emami; Saghar Azizi; Laleh Saboori; Atabak Naderi; Mehrdad Ziaei; Hamed Ahangi; Shpejtim Arifi; Parichehr Moshrefi; Masoumeh Aghajani
- Composer: Arman Mosapour
- Country of origin: Iran
- Original language: Persian
- No. of seasons: 1
- No. of episodes: 20

Production
- Producer: Mehdi Faraji
- Production location: Tehran
- Cinematography: Naser Kavousi
- Editor: Bahram Abparvar
- Running time: 45 minutes

Original release
- Network: IRIB TV5
- Release: 22 July – 2 December 2017

Legionnaire (Persian: لژیونر) is an Iranian television comedy series from 2017, directed by Masoud Abparvar.

== Storyline ==
Two old friends named Bahman and Tofigh, who grew up like two brothers under the supervision of a father but have different personalities. Bahman is a TV sports presenter who recently retired, and like Bahram Shafi, who cares about the honesty and honor of football, has launched an internet program called "Yellow Card" in which he raises football topics and issues. But on the other side of him, Tofigh has appeared as a football dealer who can turn the backstage of football.

The difference in the views of these two people in reporting issues and the honesty and narration behind the football scene makes them face each other.

== Cast ==
- Hasan Pourshirazi as Bahman
- Mohammad-Reza Sharifinia as Tofigh
- Zahir Yari as Farhad
- Helia Emami as Sepideh
- Saghar Azizi as Foroogh (Mother of Sepideh)
- Laleh Saboori as Effat
- Atabak Naderi as Reza Azin
- Mehrdad Ziaei as Hoomayoon Yazdani
- Hamed Ahangi as Tabesh
- Shpejtim Arifi as Alfredo
- Parichehr Moshrefi as Hotel manager
- Payam Ahmadinia as Jaber
- Masoumeh Aghajani as Farida
- Azin Raoof as Roya
- Ladan Soleimani as Fariba
- Minoo Nobahari as Daughter of Fariba and Homayoon
- Behnaz Yadegari as Mahshid Malekzadeh
- Sina Nejat Nemat as Heshmat (Brother of Foroogh)
