= Sahar Zakaria =

Iranian actress (born 1973)

- سحر زکریا
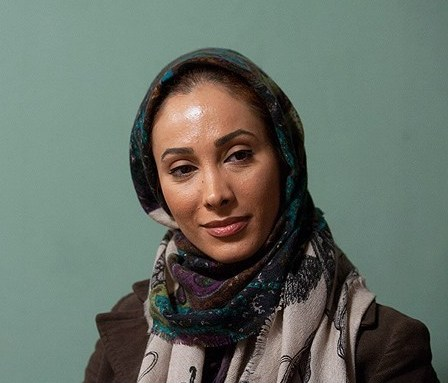
- Zakaria in 2012
- Born: 19 December 1973 (age 52); Arak, Iran
- Education: Academic Center for Education, Culture and Research - Theater
- Occupation: Actress
- Years active: 1995–present

Sahar Zakaria (Persian: سحر زکریا; born 19 December 1973) is an Iranian television and film actress. Zakaria was born in Arak. She rose to prominence through various Mehran Modiri's shows and soap operas such as Pavarchin, Marde Dohezar Chehreh, and Ghahve-ye Talkh.

== Career ==
Sahar Zakaria made her acting debut with the series Under Your Protection (1995), before trying her hand at stage acting. She played in the movie A Man Made of Glass (1998).

Sahar has also appeared in movies including Boys of the Moonlight (An Army in the Dark) (2002), The Second Woman (2007), Fatherly Secrets (2009), and Men Are from Mars, Women Are from Venus (2010). Among the series she has starred in Tiptoe (2002), The Man of Two Thousand Faces (2008), Bitter Coffee (2009), The Billionaire (2012) and In Hashieh (2014–2015) are better-known works.

== Controversies ==
=== Activity ban ===
In February 2021, following the death of Ali Ansarian, Sahar Zakaria expressed criticism on her personal social media page regarding the failure to procure COVID-19 vaccines, prompting a sharp response from the television program 20:30. In April 2021, she announced in a video that she had been banned from working due to this protest.

=== Non-payment of wages ===
In April 2021, Sahar Zakaria released a video stating that she had not been paid for her role in the series Bitter Coffee. She also shared evidence on her Instagram page of threats allegedly made by individuals associated with Mehran Modiri.

=== Removal of hijab ===
During the 2022 Iranian protests, Zakaria removed her hijab and wrote, "It’s been about a month since I shaved my hair. I didn’t want to announce it because I was embarrassed, but if it can help alleviate any pain, I’m here."

=== Summons to court ===
In December 2023, Sahar Zakaria, along with Saba Kamali and Danial Moghadam, was summoned to court due to the release of the song Houri.

== Filmography ==
Most notable works:

- Pavarchin
- Marde Dohezar Chehreh
- Ghahveye Talkh

=== Television ===
Year	Title	Director	Notes
1995	In Your Shelter	Hamid Labkhandeh	Network 2
1997	Eternal Train	Behrooz Baghaei, Reza Attaran	Network 3
1998	Sweet World of the Sea	Behrooz Baghaei	Network 1
1999	Scorpion 33	Mehdi Shamsaei	Network 3
2000	Companion	Ghasem Jafari	Network 3
2000	Today's Youth	Yousef Seyed Mahdavi	Network 3
2001	Unknown Cases	Jamal Shourjeh	Network 2
2002	Rain of Love	Ahmad Amini, Fereydoun Hassanpour	Network 5
2002	Pavarchin	Mehran Modiri	Network 5
2003	O Positive	Ali Shahhatami	Network 1, Aired during Nowruz 2004
2004	Red Pearl	Shapur Gharib, Masoud Rasam	Network 5
2005	For the Last Time	Akbar Mansour Fallah	Network 5, Aired during Ramadan
2008	Road Under Repair	Hossein Tabrizi	Network 2
2008	Man of Two Thousand Faces	Mehran Modiri	Network 3
2012	Billionaire	Alireza Amini	Network 1
2014	On the Sidelines 1	Mehran Modiri	Network 3, In two seasons
2015	On the Sidelines 2	Mehran Modiri	Network 3
2017–2018	Time to Laugh		Network 3
2025	Six-Month-Old	Mehran Modiri	Network 3

=== Cinema ===
Year	Title	Director
1998	Man of Crystal	Saeed Soheili
2002	Sons of Moonlight (Soldier in the Dark)	Mehdi Vedadi
2005	Trap	Siroos Alvand
2006	If You Can, Catch Me	Shahram Ahmadlou
2007	Second Wife	Siroos Alvand
2007	If You Can, Kill Me	Shahram Ahmadlou
2007	Something Like a Miracle	
2008	Beloved	Qodratollah Solh Mirzai
2009	Stubbornness	Seyed Mehdi Barqei
2009	Paternal Secrets	
2010	Venusian Women, Martian Men	Kazem Rastgoftar
2011	About Life	Mohsen Rabiei
2013	Fake Reality	Roozbeh Rouhipour
2018	Bazivoo	Amir Hossein Qehqarai
2018	Janan	Kamran Qadakchian

=== Web ===
Year	Title	Role	Director	Notes
2010	Bitter Coffee	Actor	Mehran Modiri	This television series was produced and aired in 2010 and 2011.
2012	Calm Tower	Actor	Masoud Atyabi	This film was not released in theaters and was distributed to the home video network in 2013.[1]
2013	I Was Kidding	Actor	Mehran Modiri	After the broadcast of all episodes, the program was aired on Network 5 with edits and censorship.
