= The Tenants (1987 film) =

- Film poster
- Directed by: Dariush Mehrjui
- Written by: Dariush Mehrjui
- Produced by: Haroun Yashayaei
- Starring: Ezzatolah Entezami; Hamideh Kheirabadi; Akbar Abdi; Farimah Farjami; Iraj Rad; Reza Rooygari; Siavosh Tahmoures
- Cinematography: Hassan Gholizadeh
- Edited by: Hassan Hassandoost
- Music by: Naser Cheshmazar
- Release date: 1987
- Country: Iran
- Language: Persian

The Tenants (Persian: اجاره‌نشین‌ها, romanized: Ejāre-nešinhā; Ejareh-Nesheenha) is a 1987 Persian comedy film directed by Dariush Mehrjui. It has been widely acclaimed as the best Iranian comedy film of the 1980s.

== Plot summary ==
The film is about an apartment in Tehran and its various tenants.

== Cast ==
- Ezzatolah Entezami
- Hamideh Kheirabadi
- Akbar Abdi
- Farimah Farjami
- Iraj Rad
- Reza Rooygari
- Siavosh Tahmoures
- Hossein Sarshar
