= Yek Santimetr Ta Labkhand =

Iranian TV series

- persian: یک سانتیمتر تا لبخند
- Written by: Hassan Hajgozar; Mohammad Javad Barghani
- Directed by: Hassan Hajgozar
- Starring: Parastoo Salehi; Reza Rooygari; Sharzad Kamalzadeh; Siamak Asharion; Hamed Fathi; Sharbanoo Mosavai
- Country of origin: Iran
- Original language: Persian
- No. of seasons: 1
- No. of episodes: 4

Production
- Producer: Sourosh Parastesh
- Running time: 40–50 minutes
- Production company: Bani Film

Original release
- Release: present

Yek Santimetr Ta Labkhand (Persian: یک سانتیمتر تا لبخند) is an Iranian television series which takes the viewer both onstage and backstage. It uses four filming formats: story, documentary, hidden camera, and house-to-house. The last is the most intriguing; it involves one person performing in a community's poorest neighborhood as its people gather around him.

== Plot ==
A boy puts on concerts in poor neighborhoods, playing to a hidden camera and making a fuss for comedic effect.

== Cast ==
- Parastoo Salehi
- Reza Rooygari
- Sharzad Kamalzadeh
- Siamak Asharion
- Hamed Fathi
- Sharbanoo Mosavai
