= Mina Jafarzadeh =

Iranian actress (born 1946)

- مینا جعفرزاده
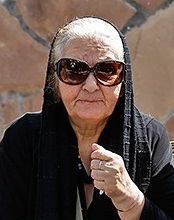
- Born: 1 January 1946 (age 79); Khoy, Iran
- Occupation: actress
- Years active: 1969–present

Mina Boyok Jafarzadeh (Persian: مینا جعفرزاده, best known as Mina Jafarzadeh; born 1946 in Khoy) is an Iranian television and cinema actress. She started her acting career in 1988 and made her film debut, Fil dar Tariki on same year. She married Bahman Zaminpour, an Iranian director.

== Selected filmography ==
- Tebyan Stories (TV series)
- Ekhrajiha
- Dear Day
- Ferris wheel (TV series)
- Flying Passion (TV series)
- Under the City's Skin (TV series)
- The Gun Loaded (TV series)
- Deldadeh
