= King of Ear =

Iranian TV series

- Also known as: Shahgoosh
- Persian: شاهگوش
- Genre: Drama; Comedy
- Written by: Elaheh Mir Bagheri; Azadeh Mohseni
- Directed by: Davood Mir-Bagheri
- Starring: Farhad Aslani; Mohsen Tanabandeh; Alireza Jafari; Tannaz Tabatabaei; Marjaneh Golchin; Hamid Reza Azarang; Ahmad Mehranfar; Hadi Kazemi; Hanieh Tavassoli; Reza Rooygari; Rasoul Najafian; Reza Kianian; Amin Zendegani; Akbar Abdi
- Theme music composer: Ali Zand Vakili
- Composer: Fardin Khalatbari
- Country of origin: Iran
- Original language: Persian
- No. of seasons: 1
- No. of episodes: 28

Production
- Executive producer: Hooman Kabiri
- Producer: Mehran Borumand
- Production location: Tehran
- Editors: Mehdi Hosseinivand; Mojtaba Esfahani
- Running time: 60 minutes

Original release
- Network: Home video
- Release: 23 October 2013 – 29 March 2014

King of Ear (Persian: شاهگوش Shahgoosh) is an Iranian drama and comedy. The series is directed by Davood Mir-Bagheri.

== Storyline ==
A man who can not replace his love for Esteghlal with anything else, He has a daughter whose suitor is a supporter of Persepolis and it is this color belonging that causes him to oppose. An accident leads to his death and the reopening of a murder case, The only witness is a man with one eye who has only recognized the color and type of car! This is how the story begins...

== Awards ==
Yas Zarrin (Golden Jasmine) Best Actor for Mohsen Tanabandeh at the 4th Yas International Film Festival and receive the Hafez Award for Best Actor.

== Cast ==
- Farhad Aslani
- Mohsen Tanabandeh
- Alireza Jafari
- Tannaz Tabatabaei
- Marjaneh Golchin
- Hamid Reza Azarang
- Ahmad Mehranfar
- Hadi Kazemi
- Hanieh Tavassoli
- Reza Rooygari
- Rasoul Najafian
- Reza Kianian
- Amin Zendegani
- Akbar Abdi
- Hossein Soleimani
- Shahram Haghighat Doost
- Hamed Mir Bagheri
- Elham Pavehnejad
- Mehrdad Sedighian
- Sirus Gorjestani
- Shabnam Farshadjoo
- Farideh Sepah Mansour
- Ardeshir Kazemi
