= Parastoo Salehi =

Iranian actress (born 1977)

- پرستو صالحی
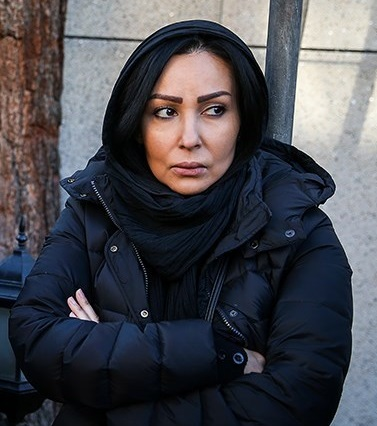
- Salehi in 2015
- Born: Elham Salehi Siavashani; 31 October 1977 (age 48); Tehran, Iran
- Occupations: Actress; Activist
- Years active: 1997–present

Parastoo Salehi (Persian: پرستو صالحی; born 31 October 1977, in Tehran) is an Iranian actress and social activist. She gained her fame from playing in Under the City Sky.

Salehi studied with Farhang Moayeri. Besides acting, she also instructs make-up for her trainees. She has a background performing for the greatest Iranian directors, such as Asghar Farhadi, Bahman Farmanara, and Massoud Kimai.

== Filmography ==
Salehi had her first role onstage in 1997 and Inn Zaminiha was her first Television performance.

=== Film ===
- The Moment of a Divorce
- Takhte-Gaaz
- Maslakh
- Namira
- Yek Nafar Ta Marg
- Irreversible
- ZigZag
- Love Again
- Manhunter
- A House in the Dust
- Agha
- Reflection
- Ham-Class
- A House Built on Water
- Eteraaz
- I Love You
- Chesmhayash

=== Television ===
Year	Title	Director(s)
1999	Inn Zaminiha	Masoud Shahmohammadi
1999	Alone in the Dark	Massoud Rashidi
1999	Shabe Cheragh	Jamal Shoorje Amir Ghavidel Majid Javanmard
2000	Hamsafaar	Ghasem Jafari
2000	Saffare Baraan	Behrooz Taheri
2000	Mehr Penhan	Najaf Oshani
2001	Under the City's Skin	Mehran Ghafourian
2001	Tabb	Abbas Moradian
2001	Esghe Salyahe Jang	Ali Bahadoor
2002	Shabakeh	Mahmud Azizi
2002	Mehmanpazire Tobaa	Manochehr Pourahmad
2003	Rojan	Mashallah Shahmoradizadeh
2004	Dobare Zendegi	Nader Moghaddas
2004	Rasme Sheydaei	Akbar Khajouei
2005	Erse Babam	Mehran Ghafourian
2014	I'm just kidding	Mehran Modiri
2015	My City, Shiraz	Kamal Banaei
2018	Yek Santimetr Ta Labkhand	Hassan Hajgozar
