= Death Is My Business =

2011 film

- Directed by: Amir Hossein Saghafi
- Written by: Amir Hossein Saghafi
- Produced by: Ali Akbar Saghafi
- Starring: Pejman Bazeghi
- Cinematography: Nader Masumi
- Release date: 7 October 2011 (BIFF)
- Running time: 90 minutes
- Country: Iran
- Language: Persian

Death Is My Business (Persian: Marg kasb va kare man ast) is a 2011 Iranian drama film directed by Amir Hossein Saghafi.

== Cast ==
- Pejman Bazeghi
- Amir Aghai
- Kamran Tafti
- Maryam Boubani
- Mahchehreh Khalili
- Akbar Sangi
- Meysam Ghanizadeh
- Sonia Espahram
