= Reza Fayazi =

Iranian film director and actor

- رضا فیاضی
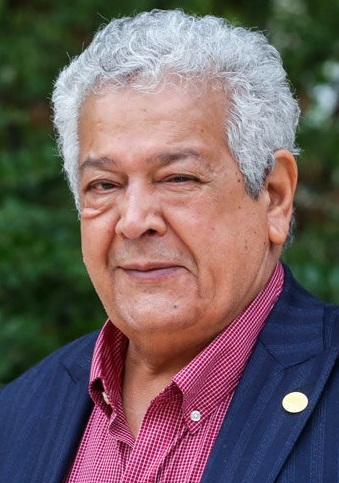
- Fayazi in 2017
- Born: July 6, 1953 (age 73); Ahvaz, Khuzestan, Iran
- Education: University of Tehran
- Occupation: Actor
- Years active: 1976–present

Reza Fayazi (Persian: رضا فیاضی; born 6 July 1953) is an Iranian actor, director, screenwriter and host.

== Career ==
In 1976, he played a role in the series Golbaran directed by Reza Babak. He then appeared in the movie Ballad of Tara directed by Bahram Beyzai and also acted as the stage manager. Since then, he has worked in various artistic fields, including writing, puppetry, and radio, and has appeared in several television programs as a presenter.

== Filmography ==
- Ballad of Tara, 1979
- Statue, 1992
- The Fateful Day, 1995
- The Blue Veiled, 1995
- Chariot of Death, 1996
- Starry Sky, 1999
- Under the City's Skin (TV series), 2002
- Roozegar-e Gharib, 2007
- The Enigma of the Shah, 2016-2017
- I'm not Trump, 2020
- Stranger (TV series), 2024
