= The Man with Two Thousand Faces =

Iranian television series

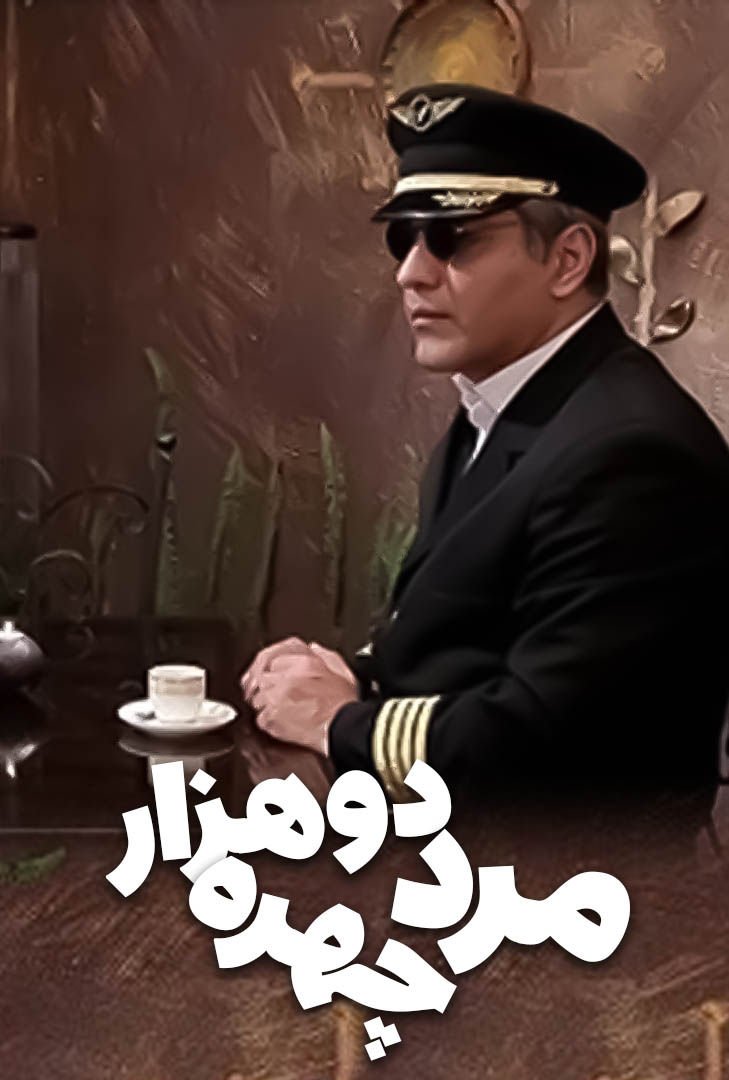
- Also known as: Man of Many Many Faces; Mard-e Do-Hezar-Chehreh
- Persian: مرد دوهزارچهره
- Genre: Comedy
- Written by: Peyman Ghasem Khani - Amir Mahdi Jule
- Directed by: Mehran Modiri
- Starring: Mehran Modiri; Siamak Ansari; Pejman Bazeghi; Borzoo Arjmand; Reza Feiz Noroozi; Sahar Zakaria; Mohammad Reza Hedayati; Sepand Amirsoleimani; Keyhan Maleki; Hadi Kazemi; Falamak Joneidi; Folor Nazari; Shima Asadi; Shadi Ahdifar; Gholam Reza Nik-khah; Parvin Ghaem-maghami
- Country of origin: Iran
- Original language: Persian
- No. of seasons: 1
- No. of episodes: 13

Production
- Producers: Hamid and Majid Aghagolian
- Production locations: Tehran, Iran
- Editor: Javad Aslani
- Running time: approximately 40–45 minutes

Original release
- Network: IRIB TV3
- Release: March 22 – April 4, 2009

Related
- The Man with a Thousand Faces; The Man with Three Thousand Faces

The Man with Two Thousand Faces or Man of Many Many Faces (Persian: مرد دوهزارچهره) is the sequel of The Man with a Thousand Faces. It was broadcast in Iran in 2009. Mehran Modiri is the director and main character. It starred Pejman Bazeghi, Reza Feiz Noroozi, Siamak Ansari and Borzoo Arjmand.

== Plot ==
The Man with Two Thousand Faces is about Masoud Shastchi (Modiri) again finding himself in situations similar to Man of Many Faces. The series begins with Masoud sitting with police officer Shahin Etemadi (Pejman Bazeghi) talking about what why he is back in court. Masoud returns to Shiraz to find that his parents have moved over embarrassment for their son's behaviour. Masoud finds his parents and learns that he has lost his job. He then goes to the house of Sahar (Falamak Joneidi) and finds out she doesn't want to see him. Masoud starts working as a wedding speaker. He gets assigned to work Sahar's wedding. Meanwhile, a guy who thinks that Masoud is Mehran Modiri asks him if he can star on a TV show. He agrees and goes back to Tehran to be Mehran Modiri. After the show finishes he meets Siamak Ansari (Siamak Ansari) and goes to his house where he is surprised by a snake, which he kills. He then goes to the studio to work on a movie. When he is about to leave, he meets Sahar Zakaria (Sahar Zakaria). He stays and they do filming that doesn't go well. After that he goes to the doctor and the doctor tells him he needs to marry someone. He thinks of Zakaria and tries to ask her but Siamak Ansari doesn't let him. Meanwhile, the real Modiri arrives from Paris and gets puzzled when people and the doctor tell him he has been in Tehran for 2 days. He goes to his house to see what has happened. Masoud is there with Ansari. Just as Mehran Modiri enters, Masoud goes to the toilet.....

== Cast and characters ==
- Mehran Modiri as Masoud Shastchi
- Pejman Bazeghi as Shahin Etemadi
- Falamak Joneidi as Sahar Jandaghi
- Siamak Ansari as Siamak Ansari
- Sahar Zakaria as Sahar Zakaria
- Reza Feiz Noroozi as Mr Jandaghi
- Gholam Reza Nik-khah as Masoud's Father
- Parvin Ghaem-maghami as Masoud's Mother
- Mehran Modiri as Mehran Modiri
- Keyhan Maleki as Airport security manager
- Hadi Kazemi
- Sepand Amirsoleimani as Responsible for flight safety

== Extra ==
- Director: Mehran Modiri
- Head-Writer: Peyman Ghasem Khani
- Writers: Mehran Ghasem Khani, Amir Mahdi Jule and Khashayar Alvand
- Producers: Majid Agha Golian, Hamid Agha Golian
- Genre: Comedy
- Number of Episodes: 13
- Release Year: March 2009
