= Stranger (Iranian TV series) =

2024 Iranian television series

- Persian: غریبه
- Genre: Mystery, Crime; Romance
- Written by: Abbas Nemati
- Directed by: Soroush Mohammadzadeh
- Starring: Hamid Goodarzi; Pejman Bazeghi; Mahya Dehghani; Reza Fayazi; Mohammad Seddighimehr; Esmail Mehrabi; Pourandokht Mahiman; Maryam Kazemi; Roya Javidnia; Bahar Ghasemi; Mahvash Vaghari; Hamidreza Hedayati; Mehri Alagha; Mahshid Javadi; Atefeh Mehrabi
- Composer: Masoud Sekhavatdoust
- Country of origin: Iran
- Original language: Persian
- No. of seasons: 1
- No. of episodes: 36

Production
- Producer: Javad Farhani
- Production location: Tehran
- Cinematography: Ehsan Ghafoorian
- Editor: Movahed Shadroo
- Running time: 45 minutes

Original release
- Network: IRIB TV3
- Release: 17 August – 2 October 2024

Stranger (Persian: غریبه ;Gharibeh) is a 2024 Iranian crime, mystery and romance television series directed by Soroush Mohammadzadeh.

== Storyline ==
A pharmaceutical elite named Amir Ali (Hamid Goodarzi), on the verge of remarriage, suddenly senses that his first wife, who drowned in the river three years ago, is alive! Amir Ali encounters intertwined stories in search for this secret.

== Cast ==
- Hamid Goodarzi as Amir Ali Samavati
- Pejman Bazeghi as Sina Shahmiri
- Mahya Dehghani as Rahele Saadat
- Reza Fayazi as Mohammad Hossein Samavati (Father of Arghavan)
- Mohammad Seddighimehr as Haghshenas (Commander of Sina)
- Esmail Mehrabi as Bahram Entezami
- Pourandokht Mahiman as Ana Shahmiri
- Maryam Kazemi as Mother of Arghavan
- Roya Javidnia as Farzaneh Entezami
- Bahar Ghasemi as Mojgan Solati
- Mahvash Vaghari as Mother of Amir Ali
- Hamidreza Hedayati as Jamal Samavati (Father of Amir Ali)
- Mehri Alagha as Mother of Raheleh
- Payam Inaloi as Pejman
- Atefeh Mehrabi as Parvaneh
- Milad Refaghati as Davood
- Kobra Goodarzi as Mother of Mojgan
- Mahshid Javadi as Arghavan Samavati
- Helen Naghilu as Zoya Shahmiri
- Ali Kashani as Kaveh Shahmiri
- Majid Potki as Hamed Ahangari
- Golnoosh Ghahremani as Talma Haddadi
- Mohammad Reza Solati as Amir Safari
- Arezoo Tehrani as Narges Salmani
- Parisa Shah Rezaei as Forough
- Mahtisa Pasandideh as Saba Samavati
- Yasaman Mirzaei as Shokoh Samavati
