= Under the Smoky Roof =

- Film poster
- زیر سقف دودی
- Directed by: Pouran Derakhshandeh
- Written by: Pouran Derakhshandeh
- Produced by: Pouran Derakhshandeh; Production Manager: Abbas Derakhshandeh
- Starring: Farhad Aslani; Merila Zarei; Behnoosh Tabatabaei; Azita Hajian; Rasoul Najafian; Laleh Marzban; Abolfazl Miri; Shahram Haghighat Doost
- Cinematography: Masood Salami
- Edited by: Hayedeh Safiyari
- Music by: Karen Homayunfar
- Distributed by: Hozeh Honari
- Release date: February 1, 2017 (FIFF)
- Running time: 110 minutes
- Country: Iran
- Language: Persian

Under the Smoky Roof (Persian: زیر سقف دودی) is a 2017 Iranian drama film written and directed by Pouran Derakhshandeh.

== Plot ==
Shirin, who is gradually having problems in family life with her child and her husband, Looking to find a way to connect with them, which fails and reaches a crisis. Her re-attempt to get out of this crisis presents her with a new challenge.

== Cast ==
- Farhad Aslani
- Merila Zarei
- Behnoosh Tabatabaei
- Azita Hajian
- Rasoul Najafian
- Laleh Marzban
- Abolfazl Miri
- Shahram Haghighat Doost
- Nafiseh Roshan
- Hesam Navab Safavi
- Fariba Motekhases
- Hadi Marzban
- Maryam Boubani
- Hushang Tavakoli
