= Shahid Babaee High School (Qazvin Sampad) =

Shahid Babaei High School

Location
- Qazvin; 36°18′2″N 50°1′15″E

Information
- Type: National Organization for Development of Exceptional Talents
- Established: 1989
- Principal: Seyyed Mohammad Ghafelebashi
- Enrollment: 411
- Campus: Near Alghadeir Park, Shahid Babaee st., qazvin
- Website: www.sbsq.ir

Shahid Babaei High School (Persian: مرکز آموزشی شهید بابایی) is Qazvin Branch of National Organization for Development of Exceptional Talents . It was named after Iranian pilot, Abbas Babaei. It is also known as QAZVIN SAMPAD (Persian: سمپاد قزوین). This branch of NODET, which is located in north of Qazvin] has intermediate and High School in the same building.

== Admission to school ==
Admission to Nodet schools is selective.

== NODET Structure ==
The schools for girls are named Farzanegan School and the boys' schools have different names in different cities.

== Shahid Babaei high school ==
This school includes intermediate and high school and was founded in 1989.

== The Campus and facilities ==
The campus is located in the Daneshgah neighborhood of Qazvin. The school has two buildings.

== Education ==
The Iranian high school system offers three important majors to all students: math-physics, natural sciences, and humanities.
