= Abbas Babaei =

Iranian fighter pilot and commander (1950–1987)

Timsar Abbas Babaei
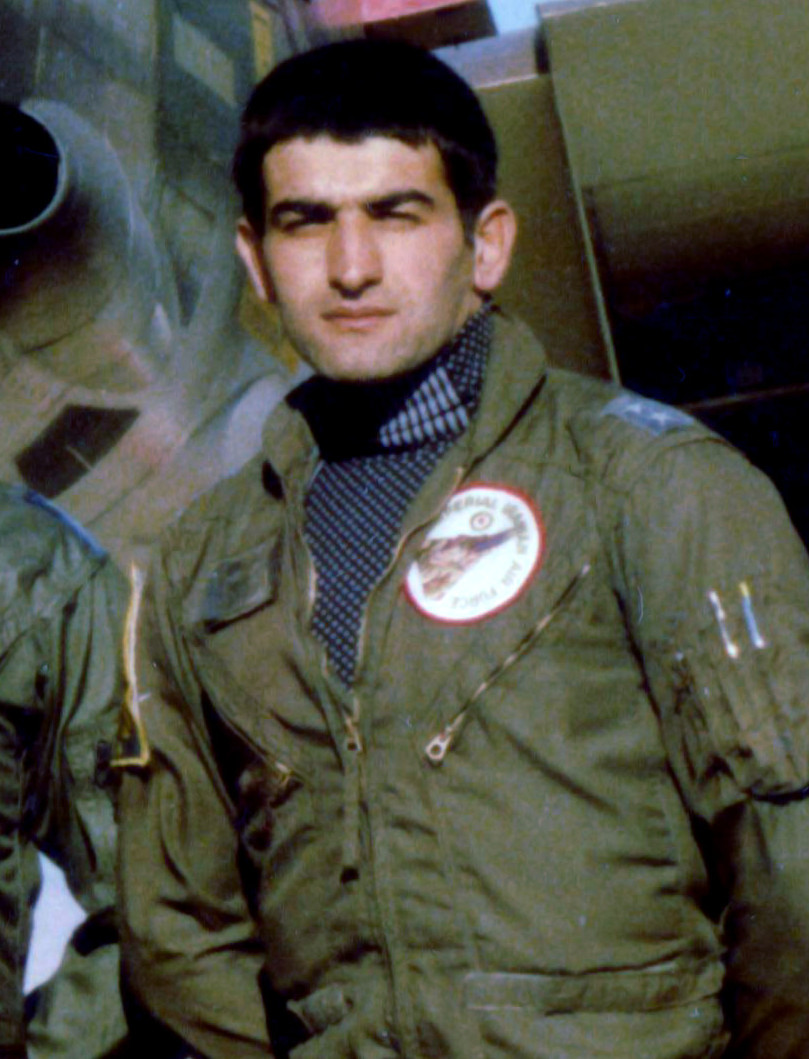
- Born: 5 December 1950; Qazvin, Iran
- Died: 6 August 1987 (aged 36); Sardasht, Iran
- Burial place: Qazvin, Iran
- Military career
- Allegiance: Iran
- Branch: Air Force
- Service years: 1969–1987
- Rank: Brigadier general
- Conflicts: Iran–Iraq War †
- Awards: 2nd grade Fath Medal

Abbas Babaei (Persian: عباس بابایی) (5 December 1950 – 6 August 1987) was an Iranian pilot and brigadier-general in the Islamic Republic of Iran Air Force (IRIAF), during the Iran–Iraq War.

== Education ==
He was born in a middle class religious family in Qazvin in 1950. Babaei was a student at Dehkhoda primary school and graduated from Nezam Vafa high school. After graduating in 1969 he moved to the United States to become a fighter pilot. During his studies in the U.S. he was chosen as the volleyball captain of the airbase volleyball team.

== Return to Iran ==
After returning to Iran following flight training, he became a pilot on the Northrop F-5 fighter aircraft. After returning to Iran he married his cousin Maliheh and moved to Dezful in Khuzestan province where he resided in the Iranian Air Force residence. He had three children, a daughter, Salma, and two sons, Hossein and Mohammad.

== The Iran–Iraq War ==
After the victory of the revolution, He became the commander of the 8th Tactical Air Base in 1981 and also appointed as the Deputy for Operations of the Army Air Force in 1983. In 1987, he was promoted to the rank of Brigadier General on the recommendation of the Chairman of the Supreme Defense Council and the approval of Imam Khomeini. During his career, he logged over 3,000 flight hours in various types of fighter aircraft. He also participated in different military operations during the war.

Aviation journalist and Iran–Iraq air war expert Tom Cooper reports that Babaei was "notorious for his merciless treatment of the pilots and officers" considered disloyal to the new regime. Cooper's research indicates:

... Col. Abbas Baba'ie, an officer differently described as the "mastermind of IRIAF’s capability to keep its F-14-fleet intact", or simply a "war hero". There are, however, numerous former IRIAF pilots who outright refuse to even mention his name, most likely because of his close cooperation with the clerical regime in Tehran.

== Death ==
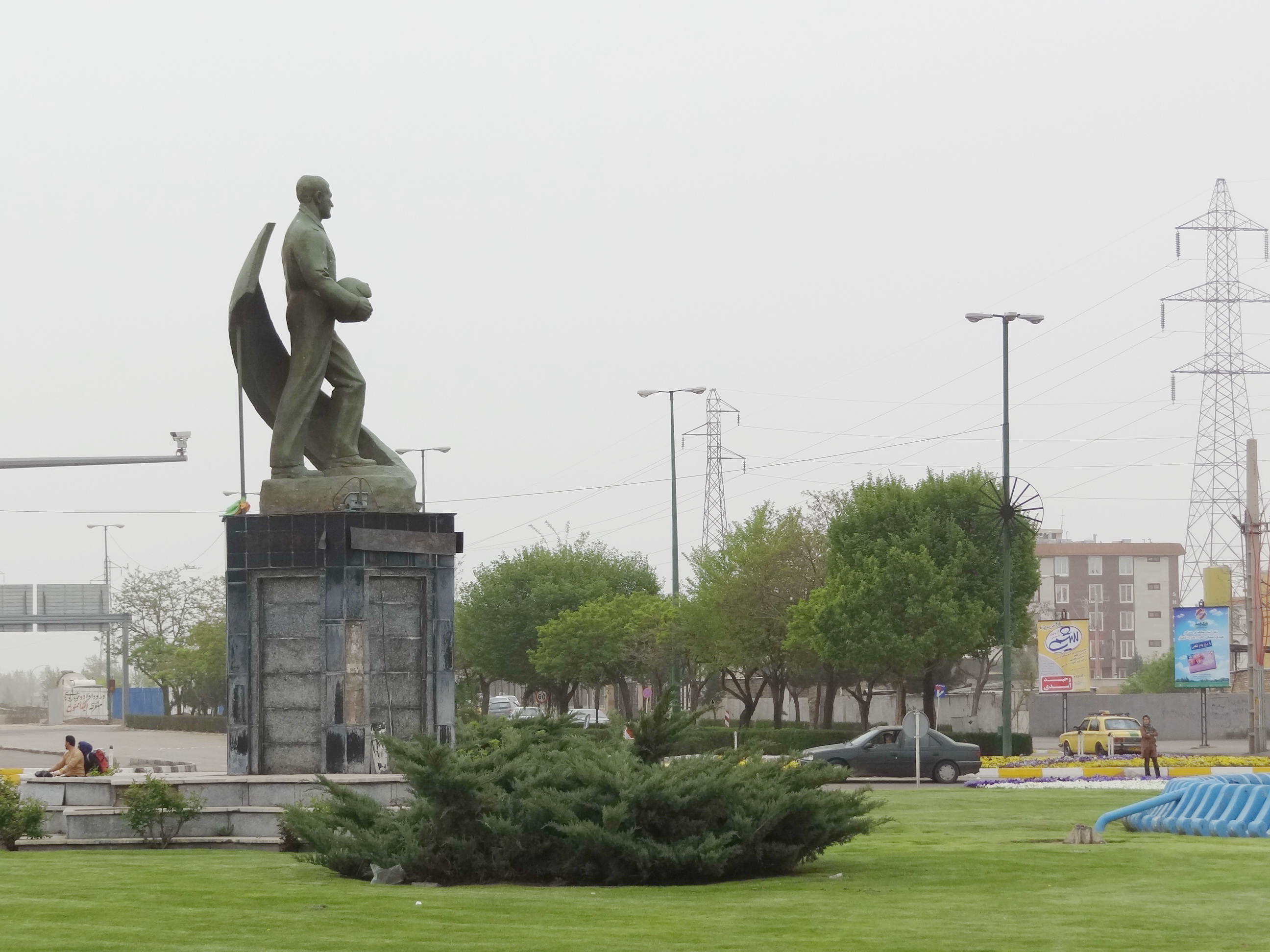
Statute of Babaei at Babaei square, Qazvin

General Abbas Babaei was killed on 6 August 1987, while in the rear seat of an F-5B while over Iraqi air space. He was hit by a 23 mm round of an air defense system on Sardasht air space, a city located in west Azerbaijan, Iran. It turned out an Iranian' defense system, operated by Sepah, had hit Babaei's aircraft in error. The pilot, Major Ali Mohammad Naderi managed to land the jet, but Babaei died within 10 minutes. Sepah used the ZSU-23 self-propelled, radar guided anti-aircraft weapon system (SPAAG) at the time.

In 2011, Flying Passion was shown on Channel 1. The film was about Babaei's lifetime.

The memory of Babayi, who earned shahid ("martyr") status for his untimely death, is preserved in the name of Shahid Babaee High School (Qazvin Sampad), his commemorative statute in Qazvin (shown at right), and in Tehran's Babayi Expressway.
