= Falamak Joneidi =

Iranian television actress (born 1973)

Falamak Joneidi فلامک جنیدی
- Born: 3 February 1973 (age 53); Tehran, Imperial State of Iran
- Occupations: Actress, writer
- Years active: 1998–present
- Spouse: Aidin Pouri

Falamak Joneidi (Persian: فلامک جنیدی; born 3 February 1973) is an Iranian television actress.

== Career ==
She has appeared in the television series Char Khooneh, Jayezeye Bozorg, Marde Do Hezar Chehreh, Mard-e Hezar-Chehreh and Shabhaye Barareh.

== Filmography ==
=== Film ===
- Unfaithful (2006)
- No Men Allowed (2011)

=== Television ===
Year	Title	Director	Character
2002	Without Description	Mehdi Mazloumi	Nasrin Delkhoon
2004	Jayezeye Bozorg	Mehran Modiri	Maliheh Jamali
2005–2006	Shabhaye Barareh	Mehran Modiri	Shadooneh Khanoom
2007	Char Khooneh	Soroush Sehhat	Rana Jamali
2008	Mard-e Hezar-Chehreh	Mehran Modiri	Sahar Jandaghi
2009	Marde Do Hezar Chehreh	Mehran Modiri	Sahar Jandaghi
2010	Ghahve-ye Talkh	Mehran Modiri	Kabootar
2023	You Only Go Around Once	Soroush Sehhat	Herself
