= Yadollah Samadi =

Iranian film director

- یدالله صمدی
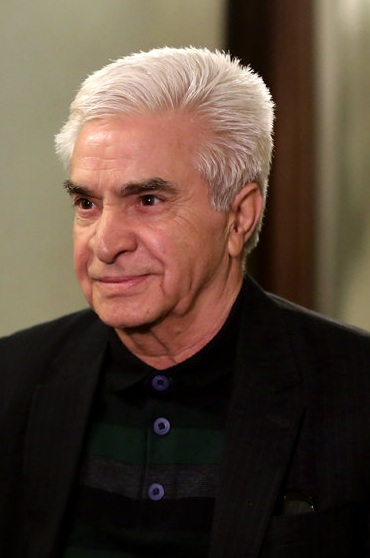
- Born: 17 November 1952; Maragheh, Iran
- Died: 25 September 2018 (aged 66–67); Shiraz, Iran
- Occupation: Film director

Yadollah Samadi (Persian: یدالله صمدی, (17 November 1952 – 25 September 2018) was an Iranian film director. He was known for directing the film Desire to Fly.
