= Akram Mohammadi =

Iranian actress (born 1958)

- اکرم محمدی
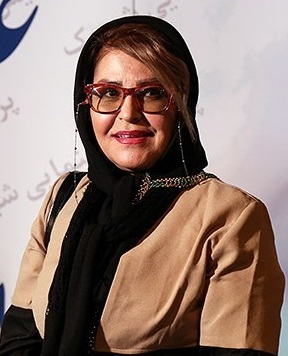
- Born: Akram Mir Mohammadi Khalil Abad; July 28, 1958 (age 67); Tehran, Iran
- Occupation: Actress
- Years active: 1987–present
- Children: Morvarid Jafari

Akram Mohammadi (Persian: اکرم محمدی) is an Iranian actress. She was born on July 28, 1958, in Tehran. She started her professional career in theater in 1983 and after a while, she was invited to play in the movie "Mother" directed by the deceased famous Ali Hatami. Then, she entered television with the series "Morghe Hag"(Truth Bird) in 1984 and acted in many works.

== Filmography ==
- One for All (2011)
- Venusian Women, Martian Men (2010)
- Concert on the Water (2010)
- Dayere Zangi (Tambourine, 2008)
- Sam and Narges (2000)
- Dokhtar-i ba Kafsh-ha-ye Katani (A Girl in Sneakers, 1998)
- Sheida (1998)
- Sahereh (The Witch, 1997)
- Darre-ye Shaparak-ha (Valley of the Butterflies, 1991)
- Voice of the Sea (1990)
- All the Nation (1990)
- Madar (Mother, 1989)

== Television series ==
- Under the City's Skin (Zir-e Poust-e Shahr)
- Pedar-Salar (The Chief-Father)
- Tenth Night
- Khaneh-ye Sabz (The Green House)
- Sarzamin-e Sabz (The Green Land)
- Man of Many Faces (Thousand-Face Man)
- Showgh-e Parvaz (Flying Passion)
- Setayesh 3
