= Rome University of Fine Arts =

Fine arts school in Rome, Italy

RUFA - Rome University of Fine Arts
- Rome University of Fine Arts (RUFA)
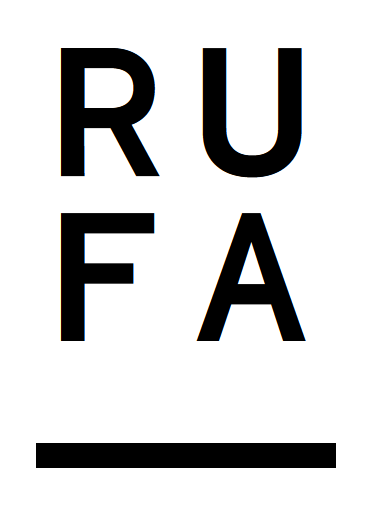
- Type: Academy of Fine Arts
- Established: 1998
- President: Alfio Mongelli
- Director: Fabio Mongelli
- Students: around 1200
- Location: Via Benaco, 2 - 00199, Rome, Lazio, Italy
- Nickname: RUFA
- Website: unirufa.it

The Rome University of Fine Arts is a private tertiary academy of arts in Rome, Italy.

== History ==
The Academy was founded by sculptor artist Alfio Mongelli in 1998.

RUFA offers Bachelor and Master of Arts degree programmes which respond in full to contemporary artistic and cultural contexts, providing an artistic training of the highest calibre and strong, concrete future employment prospects.

The Fine Arts school offers courses of Painting and visual arts, Sculpture and installations, Design,

Printmaking,  Set design, Graphic design, Comics and illustration and Visual and innovation design, Design and Design for humans, Multimedia arts and design, Computer animation and visual effects,  Cinema, and Photography.[2] Some classes use Italian as language, some use English and some are mixed.[3]
