= Farnoosh Samadi =

Iranian screenwriter and film director

- فرنوش صمدی
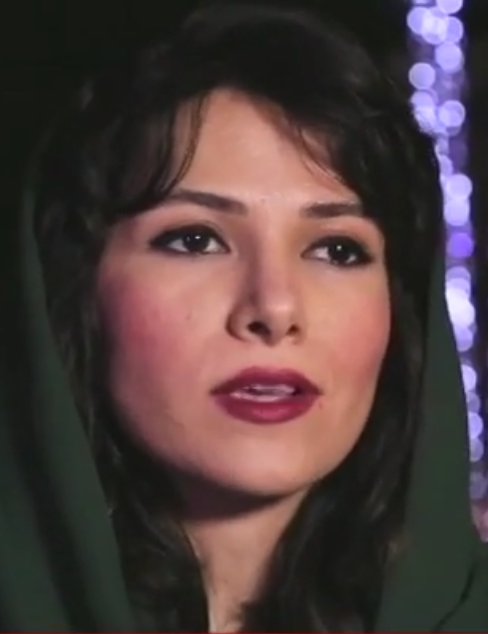
- Samadi at the 2016 Cannes Film Festival
- Born: December 23; Isfahan, Iran
- Education: Rome University of Fine Arts
- Occupations: Director; screenwriter

Farnoosh Samadi (Persian: فرنوش صمدی; born December 23) is an Iranian director and screenwriter. Her short film The Silence (2016) was nominated for a Short Film Palme d'Or at the 2016 Cannes Film Festival.

== Career ==
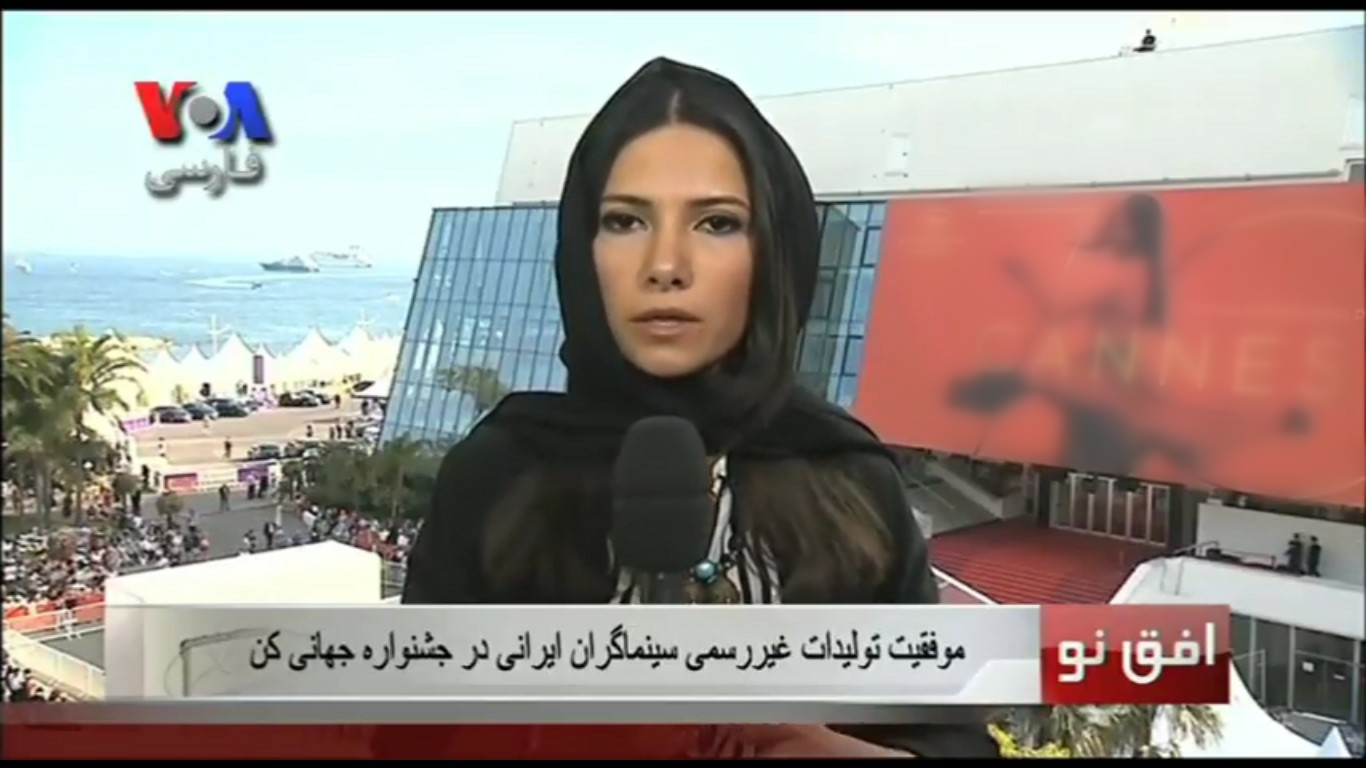
Farnoosh Samadi at 2017 Cannes Film Festival on an interview with Voice of America Persian News Network

Farnoosh Samadi was born in Iran. She graduated from the Fine Arts Academy in Rome. She directed the short films "The Silence" (2016), "Gaze" (2017), and "The Role" (2018). "180° Rule" (2020) is her first feature. "The Silence" her first short film co-directed by Ali Asgari, had its world premiere in competition at the 2016 Cannes Film Festival. Her second short film, "Gaze" had its world premiere at the 2017 Locarno Film Festival and won the Grand Jury award for Live Action Short Film at 2017 AFI Film Festival, also it won the Golden Pram Award at Zagreb Film Festival in 2018. she has screenplayed "Disappearance" a debut feature by Iranian director Ali Asgari which premiered at 74th Venice International Film Festival and at the 2017 Toronto International Film Festival and won the award for best film at the 28th Singapore International Film Festival in 2017. her debut film 180° Rule (2020) premiered at the 2020 Toronto International Film Festival, and received an award at 65th Valladolid International Film Festival for the Best Film of Meeting Point section also received two Crystal Simorgh award nominations for the "Best Sound Effects" for Amir Hossein Ghasemi and "Best Supporting Actress" for Azita Hajian at the 39th Fajr International Film Festival.

== Filmography ==
=== Feature film ===
Year	Title	Director	Screenwriter	Notes
2017	Disappearance	No	Yes	premiered at the 2017 Venice International Film Festival
2020	180° Rule	Yes	Yes	premiered at the 2020 Toronto International Film Festival

=== Short film ===
Year	Title	Director	Screenwriter	Notes
2013	More Than Two Hours	No	Yes	premiered at the 2013 Cannes Film Festival
2014	The Baby	No	Yes	premiered at the 2014 Venice International Film Festival
2015	Pain	No	Yes	
2016	The Silence	Yes	Yes	premiered at the 2016 Cannes Film Festival
2017	Gaze	Yes	Yes	premiered at the 2017 Locarno International Film Festival
2018	Delay	No	Yes	premiered at the 2018 LA Film Festival
2018	The Role	Yes	Yes	premiered at the 2018 Tirana International Film Festival
2019	Exam	No	Yes	premiered at the 2018 Toronto International Film Festival
2020	Witness	No	Yes	premiered at the 2020 BFI London Film Festival
2020	Pilgrims	Yes	Yes	premiered at the 2020 Warsaw Film Festival

== Awards and nominations ==
Award	Year	Category	Nominated Work	Result	Ref.
20minmax International Short Film Festival	2017	Best Short Film	The Silence	Won	
Adana International Film Festival	2016	Best Short Fiction Film	The Silence	Won	
AFI Fest	2017	Best Live Action Short Film	Gaze	Won	
Aix-en-Provence Tous Courts International Short Film Festival	2016	Best Short Film	The Silence	Nominated	
Aix-en-Provence Tous Courts International Short Film Festival	2020	Best Short Film	Pilgrims	Nominated	
Ajyal Youth Film Festival	2016	Best Short Film	The Silence	Nominated	
Amarcort Film Festival	2020	Best Short Film	Pilgrims	Nominated	
Annapolis Film Festival	2021	Best Narrative Short	Witness	Nominated	
Anonimul International Independent Film Festival	2017	Best International Short Film	The Silence	Won	
Atlanta Film Festival	2017	Best Narrative Short	The Silence	Won	
Batumi International Art-House Film Festival	2017	Best Short Film	Gaze	Nominated	
Beirut International Women Film Festival	2021	Best Foreign Language Feature Film	180° Rule	Won	
Beirut Shorts International Film Festival	2021	Best Screenplay – Short Film	Exam	Won	
Berlin International Short Film Festival Interfilm	2016	Best International Short Film	The Silence	Won	
Brussels Short Film Festival	2017	Best International Short Film	The Silence	Nominated	
BUFF International Film Festival	2017	Best Short Film	The Silence	Won	
Busan International Film Festival	2017	Best Short Film	Gaze	Nominated	
Cannes Film Festival	2016	Short Film Palme d'Or	The Silence	Nominated	
Chicago International Film Festival	2019	Gold Hugo – Live Action Short Film	The Role	Nominated	
Cinema Jove Valencia International Film Festival	2017	Best Short Film	The Silence	Nominated	
Cyprus Film Days International Festival	2021	Best Film	180° Rule	Nominated	
David di Donatello	2022	Best Short Film	Pilgrims	Nominated	
Fajr Film Festival	2017	Best Short Film	The Silence	Nominated	
Toronto International Film Festival	2020	Best Film – Discovery Section	180° Rule	Nominated	
Valladolid International Film Festival	2016	Best Short Film – Golden Spike	The Silence	Won	
Valladolid International Film Festival	2017	Best Short Film – Golden Spike	Gaze	Won	
Valladolid International Film Festival	2020	Best Feature Film – Meeting Point	180° Rule	Won	
ZubrOFFka International Short Film Festival	2017	Best Short Film – Special Mention	Gaze	Won	
