= Reza Fieze Norouzi =

Iranian actor

Reza Feize Nouri
- رضا فیض نوروزی
- Born: June 25, 1951 (age 75); Kermanshah, Iran
- Education: University of Arizona; University of Tehran
- Occupation: Actor
- Spouse: Zohreh Mojabi

Reza Fieze Norouzi (Persian: رضا فیض نوروزی; born June 25, 1951) is an Iranian actor known for his work in cinema and television.

Feyz Norouzi began his acting journey by attending acting classes at the House of Theater in Qazvin, where he studied the basics of acting. In 1971, he was admitted to the Faculty of Fine Arts at the University of Tehran, where he pursued an academic education in acting. The following year, he completed a training course to become an instructor at the Institute for the Intellectual Development of Children and Young Adults (IIDCYA) and began working as a mentor in the organization. In 1973, he started collaborating with Iranian television, focusing on the collection of folklore and tales from western Iran.

After graduating from the University of Tehran in 1976, Feyz Norouzi was employed by IIDCYA, where he worked as an educational inspector for theater. In September 1978, he moved to the United States to further his studies and enrolled in the Department of Theater at the University of Arizona, where he studied acting and directing. In 1983, he completed his master's and doctoral degrees with a thesis titled "The Director's Pre-Production Analysis of Bertolt Brecht's The Caucasian Chalk Circle," and directed the play as part of his final project.

During his time at the University of Arizona, Feyz Norouzi also acted in several productions, including "Tango" by Sławomir Mrożek and "Everybody Loves Me" by Neil Simon, alongside Reza Jian, who was also in the United States at the time. In 1995, Feyz Norouzi returned to Iran after 16 years in the United States. Upon his return, he resumed his acting career in Iranian cinema and television, making his first appearance in the popular TV series "Cactus." After a period of successful work in Iran, he returned to the United States once again, marking the end of his artistic career.

== Filmography ==
- Kaktus 1 (Cactus: Part I )
- Kaktus 2 (Cactus: Part II )
- Kaktus 3 (Cactus: Part III )
- Roya-ye natamam
- Bayram
- Rooz-e Raftan
- Ali & Dani
- Borj Aram
- Jooje-Ordak-e Man
- Gohar-e Kamal
- Tarzan va Tarzaan
- Kolah ghermezi and Sarvenaz
- Kolah Ghermezi and Pesar Khaleh
- Kamarbandha ra bebandim
- Moomiyai III
- Mard-e Hezar-Chehreh (The Thousand-Face Man), as Mr Jandaghi
- Mard-e Do-Hezar-Chehreh (The Two-Thousand Face Man), as Mr Jandaghi
- Ghahve-ye Talkh
