= Pejman Bazeghi =

Iranian actor (born 1974)

- پژمان بازغی
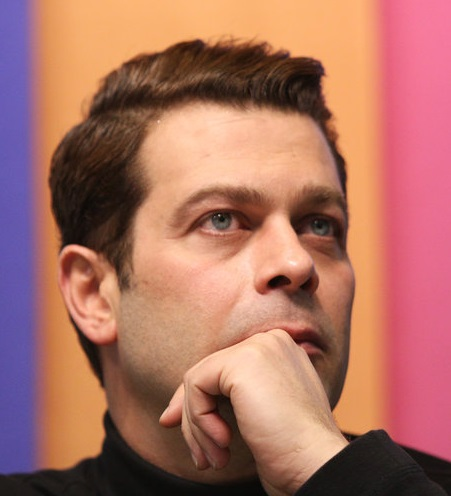
- Bazeghi at the 2019 Fajr Film Festival
- Born: August 10, 1974 (age 52); Tehran, Iran
- Occupation: Actor
- Years active: 1994–present
- Spouse: Mastaneh Mohajer (m. 2005; div. 2022)
- Children: 1

Pejman Bazeghi (Persian: پژمان بازغی; born August 10, 1974) is an Iranian actor.

== Early life and career ==
Bazeghi was born on August 10, 1974, in Tehran, Iran to an ethnic Gilaki Persian-speaking family. He is the second child of a family of five, with an origin from the Northern part of Iran, Lahijan. During his childhood, due to his father’s job, he moved and lived in different cities which gave him a lot of experience for his future. After the Islamic revolution, when he was only four years old, his family moved to Rasht. During Iran’s war with Iraq because his father became one of the guardians to defend southern sea borders of Iran, his family moved to Boushehr. After the war and his family’s return to Tehran, Pejman got accepted in the Islamic Azad University, Lahijan Branch and moved there to continue his education in the field of Mining engineering. It was there that he got interested in cinema and acting. In 1994, he entered the central youth cinema of Gilan and acted in his first film called Eteraf, directed by Majid fahimkhah. After that, he acted in his first television series, Azhanse Doosti, for about two years, where he got the chance of working alongside Hossein Panahi. He became a more prominent actor in 2004 after starring in the film Duel, which won six awards at the 22nd Fajr International Film Festival.

== Filmography ==
=== Film ===
Year	Title	Role	Director	Ref.
2004	Duel	Zinal	Ahmad Reza Darvish	
2006	Cafe Setareh		Saman Moghadam	
2008	Landing In Exile	Foroud	Saeed Asadi	
2019	Blade and Termeh	Amir	Kiumars Pourahmad	
2019	Symphony No. 9	Amir Kabir	Mohammad Reza Honarmand	
2011	Death Is My Profession	Shokrollah	Amir Hossein Saghafi	
2011	Nadarha	Ali	Mohammad Reza Arab	
2014	This Apple Is For You	Mehrdad	Sirus Alvand	
2014	Atousa's Laughter	Moosa	Alireza Farid	
2015	Nahid	Masoud	Ida Panahandeh	
2016	Barcode	Saman	Mostafa Kiaei	
2016	Alma Group	Pejman	Abbas Moradian	
2016	Israfil	Behrouz	Ida Panahandeh	
2017	Helen	Bobby	Ali Akbar Saghafi	
2020	Fourth Round		Alireza Amini	
2020	Hedgehog		Mastaneh Mohajer	
2020	Bail		Hossein Ghasemi Jami	
2021	The Sun of That Moon		Setareh Eskandari	
2021	Be Human Once A Week	Mani	Sharam Shah Hosseini	
2024	Paradise of Criminals		Masoud Jafari Jozani	

=== Web ===
Year	Title	Role	Director	Platform
2021	His Majesty	Mirza Reza Kermani	Hamed Mohammadi	Filimo
2021	Once Upon a Time in Iran	Colonel Sangari	Tina Pakravan	Namava
TBA	One Thousand and One Nights		Mostafa Kiaee	Filimo

=== Television ===
- Paytakht directed by Siroos Moghaddam in 2012
- Friendly Agency directed by Ahmad Ramezanzadeh
- This is Not a Court directed by Asghar Tavasoli
- The Elite Group directed by Mehrdad Khoshbakht
- Under the City's Skin directed by Mehran Ghafourian
- The Lost directed by Rambod Javan
- The Sea People directed by Syrouse Moghadam
- The Passing of Love directed by Mohamadreza Ahan
- The Edge of Darkness
- Mard-e Hezar-Chehreh directed by Mehran Modiri in 2008
- Marde Do Hezar Chehreh directed by Mehran Modiri in 2009
- In Search of Peace directed by saeed soltani in 2016-2017
- Love in Persian
- Gando directed by Javad Afsha in 2019
- Maple directed by Behrang Tofighi in 2021
- Stranger directed by Soroush Mohammadzadeh in 2024

== See also ==
- Iranian cinema
