= Hassan Hajgozar =

Iranian film director (born 1971)

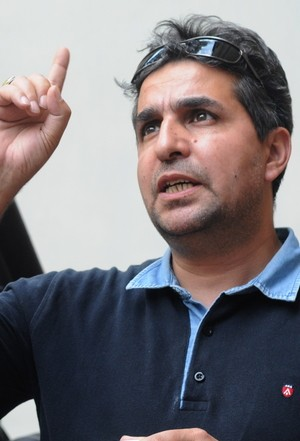
- Born: 21 April 1971 (age 54); Mashhad, Iran
- Occupations: Film director; screenwriter; Film producer
- Years active: since 1988

Hassan Hajgozar born April 1, 1971, in Tehran) is an Iranian film director. He started directing theater in 1988. He has directed documentaries and fiction films. He is also a producer and scriptwriter.

== Filmography ==
=== As a director and scriptwriter ===
Year	Title	Director	Writer	Producer
2009	Aghaye Aziz	Yes	Yes	No
2013	'roo nevesht	Yes	Yes	Yes
2014	coin	Yes	Yes	No
2018	Be Vaghte Talagh	Yes	Yes	No
2019	Dookhtaran Ham Mimirand'	Yes	Yes	No

=== As a director and series ===
Year	Title
2009	Yek Santimetr Ta Labkhand
