= Siamak Ansari =

Iranian actor and director (b. 1968)

- سیامک انصاری
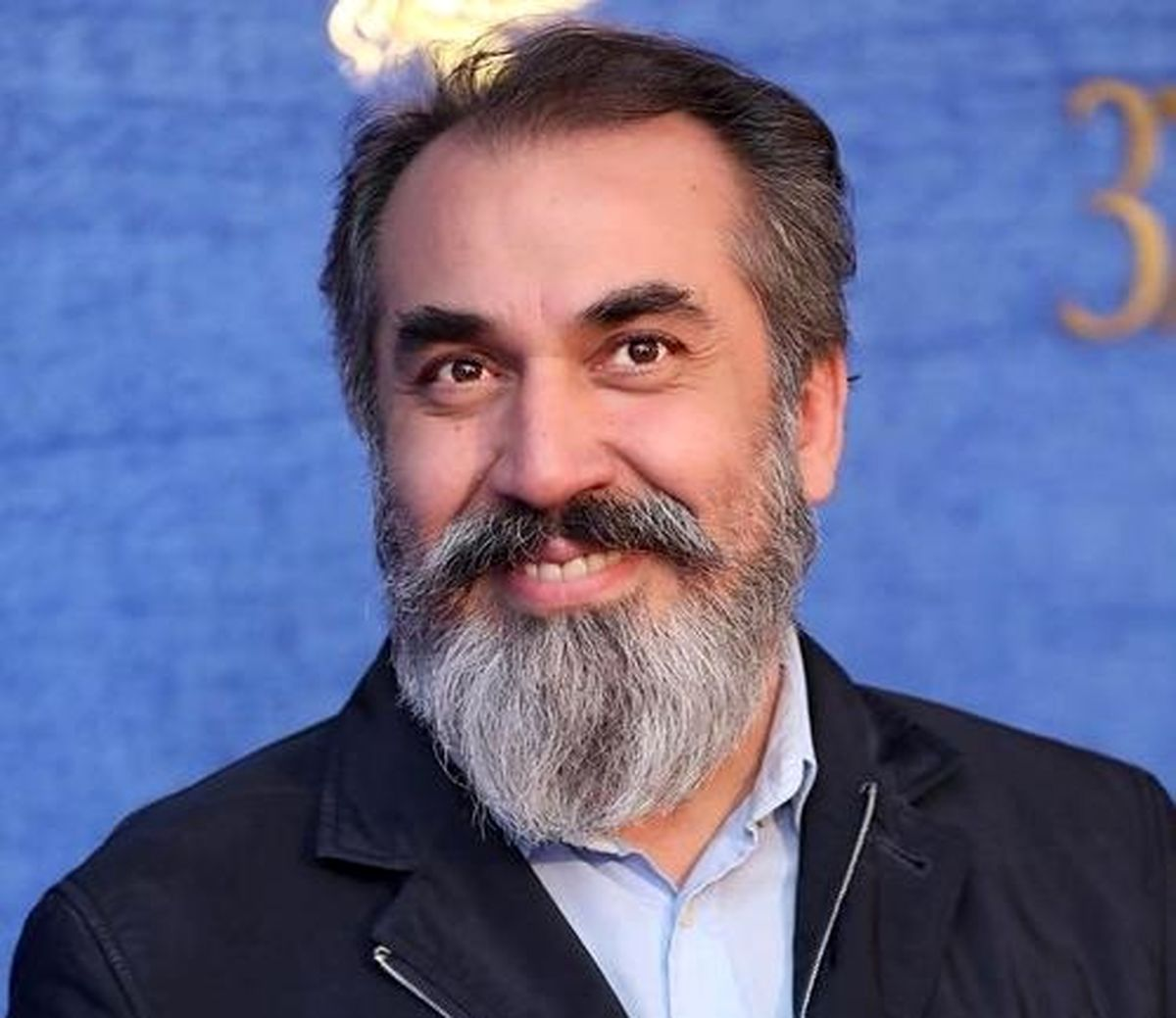
- Born: 3 August 1968 (age 57); Tehran, Imperial State of Iran
- Education: Tehran University of Art
- Occupation: Actor
- Years active: 1987–present
- Spouse: Tannaz Hadian (m. 2011; div. 2018)
- Website: siamakansari.com

Siamak Ansari (Persian: سیامک انصاری; born 3 August 1968) is an actor and director, mostly known for his appearances in sitcom comedy series.

He has many feature films and has worked with major Iranian film directors. He has been nominated for a best-selling actor, and best actor nomination for Fajr and Hafiz Film Festivals.

He studied arts and got his bachelor's from Azad University. He married Tannaz Hadian in 2011 but got divorced later in 2018.

In April 2007, Ansari made his directing debut named Faza Navardan (the Astronauts). This included cast from Shabhaye Barareh: Hadi Kazemi, Reza Shafiei Jam and Shaghayegh Dehghan and also Nasrollah Radesh from Baghe Mozaffar.

== Filmography ==
- Jome Bazar (1997, TV series)
- Golhaye 77 (1998, TV series)
- Hotel (1998, TV series)
- Youthful Days (1999, TV series)
- Pavarchin (Tiptoe) (2002, TV series)
- Noghtechin (Dotting) (2003, TV series)
- Jayezeye Bozorg (Grand Prize) (2005, TV series)
- Age babam zende bood (If my father was alive)
- Shabhaye Barareh (Barare Nights) (2005, TV series)
- Faza Navardan (The Astronauts) - (2006, TV series)
- Baghe Mozaffar (Mozafar's garden) - (2006, TV series)
- Marde Hezar Chehreh (Thousand-Face Man) - (2008, TV series)
- Davat (Invitation) - (2008 feature film by Ebrahim Hatamikia)
- Marde Do Hezar Chehreh (Two-Thousand Face Man) - (2009, TV series)
- Ghahve-ye Talkh (Bitter Coffee) - (2010 - 2012, Home Media TV series)
- Vilaye Man (My Villa) - (2012 - 2013, Home Media TV series)
- Ganje Mozaffar (Mozafar's treasure) - (2013, Home Media TV series)
- Shookhi Kardam (I'm just kidding) - (2013 - 2014, Home Media TV series)
- Dar Hashiye (AT Hashieh) - (2015, TV series)
- Dorehami (Gathering) - (2016, Telecast)
- 5 afternoon - (2017, comedy film)
- Joker - (2021, Reality TV show)
