= Reza Servati =

Iranian theater director (born 1984)

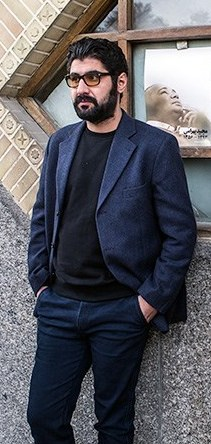
- Servati at the funeral ceremony of Majid Bahrami
- Born: 3 January 1984 (age 42); Tehran, Iran
- Education: Dramatic Literature, Directing
- Alma mater: Islamic Azad University (Tonekabon Branch), Tarbiat Modares University
- Occupations: Theater director; Playwright; Dramaturg
- Notable work: "The List", "Wonders of Creation"

Reza Servati (Persian: رضا ثروتی; born 3 January 1984, in Tehran) is an Iranian writer, theater director, theater actor, and choreographer. He holds a bachelor's degree in dramatic literature from Islamic Azad University, Tonekabon Branch and a master's degree in directing from Tarbiat Modares University.

== Theater productions ==
Servati has produced and performed numerous theatrical works. Since 2003, he has been active as a writer, director, and actor in various productions. Some of his notable works include "Wonders of Creation," "Macbeth," and "The List." Some of his works, such as "Macbeth" and "Wonders of Creation," have been performed in cities like Amsterdam, Batumi, Tbilisi, Poti, Chiatura, Torino, and Bologna, participating in various festivals.

=== The Play Not Fallen ===
One of Reza Servati's earliest plays, Not Fallen, was selected as a distinguished performance at the 10th International University Theater Festival.

=== Macbeth Play ===
The production of Macbeth, directed and written by Servati, was staged at the Fajr International Theater Festival in 2010. It won the festival's jury award and became the most-watched play of the venue. The play was also performed at the 17th Rainbow Festival in Saint Petersburg and was selected as the best play of the festival by the Russian Theater Critics Association. Additionally, it was staged at the Iranian Modern Arts Festival in Bologna, Italy, in 2016 and at the Gdańsk Festival in Poland in 2017.

=== Wonders of Creation Play ===
Following Macbeth, Servati wrote and directed Wonders of Creation in 2011. This play was also selected as one of the top performances at the Fajr International Theater Festival. It was later staged for the public at Samandarian Hall in 2013. Between 2013 and 2019, Servati directed several other significant works, including The List of the Dead, Body Salinity, and Veronica’s Room.

=== Woyzeck Play ===
Servati’s production of Woyzeck in the early 2010s won the Special Jury Prize in the international section of the 31st Fajr Theater Festival. This play was also part of a European tour, performed at Piccolo Teatro in Italy and the Nancy Festival in France.

== List of works ==
Title	Role
Az Pa Niyoftadeh	Writer, Director, Dramaturge, Actor
Ajaeb Al-Makhluqat	Writer, Designer, Director
Gom Bast	Writer, Dramaturge
Ta'sir-e Seda-ye Zooze-ye Bad	Writer, Dramaturge, Director
Macbeth	Writer, Designer, Director
Estentagh	Director, Actor
Kosoof	Director
Gharb-e Haghighi	Actor
Tan Shouri	Writer, Designer, Director
Crime and Punishment	Writer, Designer, Director
The List	Writer, Designer, Director
Woyzeck	Designer, Director
Veronica’s Room	Dramaturge, Designer, Director
Malone Dies	Director
Sangfarsh	Director
Estentagh	Director
From Ashes to Ashes	Director
Harakiri in Iranian Style	Writer, Dramaturge

== Awards ==
- Special Jury Award in the International Competition Section of the 28th Fajr International Theater Festival for the play Macbeth
- Special Jury Award in the International Competition Section of the 29th Fajr International Theater Festival for Ajaeb Al-Makhluqat
- Special Jury Award in the International Competition Section of the 31st Fajr International Theater Festival for the play Woyzeck
