= Yekta Naser =

Iranian actress and model (born 1978)

- یکتا ناصر
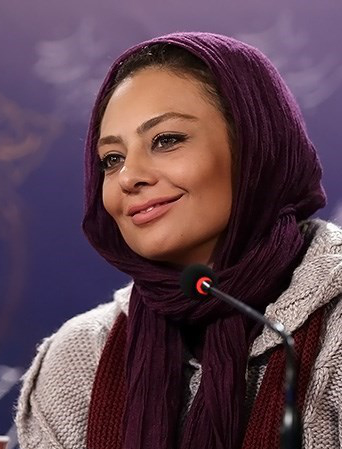
- Yekta Naser at 32nd Fajr International Film Festival, 2013
- Born: 3 November 1978 (age 47); Tehran, Iran
- Education: Islamic Azad University - Environment
- Years active: 1997–present
- Spouse: Manouchehr Hadi (m. 2016)
- Children: 1
- Awards: Best Supporting Actress from 30th Fajr Film Festival

Yekta Naser (Persian: یکتا ناصر) is an Iranian actress and model born on November 3, 1978 in Tehran, Iran.

== Early life ==
Yekta Naser received a Crystal Simorgh for Best Actress in a Supporting Role at the 30th Fajr International Film Festival for her performance in Someone Wants to Talk to You (2011).

She has appeared in several TV series such as Stay With Me (2000), The First Night of Peace (2005), The Daughters of Eve (2012), and The Old Road (2015).

She has also taken part in various movies, including Murder Online (2005), Someone Wants to Talk to You (2011) and I Am Not Salvador (2015).

== Filmography ==
- 2001 - Saghi
- 2005 - Online Murder
- 2005 - Farari
- 2005 - The Birthday Chant
- 2008 - Shirin
- 2012 - Sobhaneh (short)
- 2015 - I Am Not Salvador
- 2018 - Rahman 1400
- 2017 - Romance Romance (TV series)
- 2019 - Del
- 2021 - Blue Nissan
- 2022 - Golden Night
