= I Am Not Salvador =

2016 comedy film by Manouchehr Hadi

- Official Poster
- Directed by: Manouchehr Hadi
- Written by: Reza Maghsoudi
- Produced by: Seyed Amir Parvin Hosseini; Mansour Sohrabpour
- Starring: Reza Attaran; Yekta Naser; Amir Arsalan AleBouyeh; Carol Vidotti; Rivaldo
- Music by: Karen Homayounfar
- Distributed by: Tasvir Gostare Pasargad
- Release date: February 24, 2016
- Running time: 90 minutes
- Country: Iran
- Languages: Persian; Portuguese
- Box office: 169.51 billion IRR (approx. $4.5 million)

I Am Not Salvador (Persian: من سالوادور نیستم) is a 2016 Iranian comedy film directed by Manouchehr Hadi. It stars Reza Attaran, Yekta Naser, and Brazilian former footballer Rivaldo.

== Cast ==
- Reza Attaran
- Yekta Naser
- Rivaldo
- Carol Vidotti
- Mehdi Mehrabi
- Zhila Sadeghi
- Sogol Mehrabi

== Release ==
The film faced initial delays before its premiere in domestic cinemas. Following its domestic release, it had an international screening in Frankfurt, Germany, and hit silver screens in Turkey.

== Box office ==
The film was a major commercial success, grossing 169.51 billion IRR (approximately $4.5 million).
