= Ali Salehi =

Iranian poet (b. 1954)

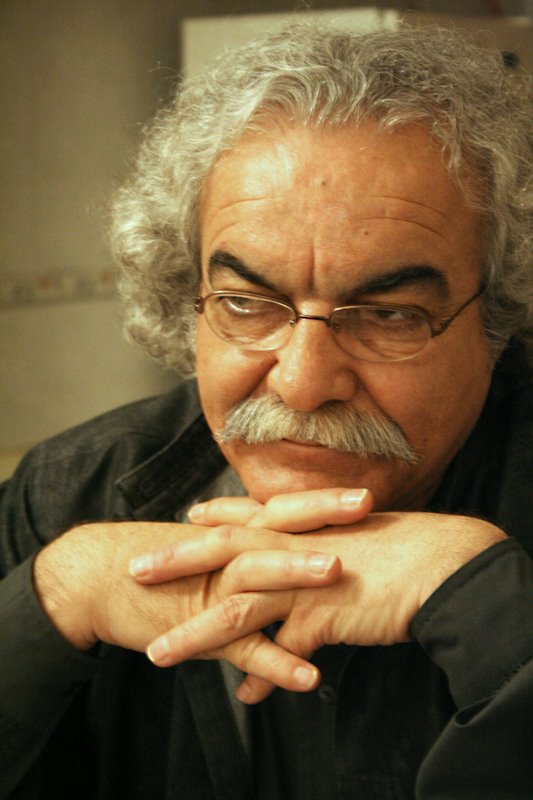
Seyed Ali Salehi, 2006

Seyed Ali Salehi (Persian: سید علی صالحی, born 1 April 1954 in Khuzestan Province, Imperial Iran) is a contemporary Iranian poet and writer. He is one of the founders of the Pure Wave movement and the founder of speech poetry and meta-speech poetry in contemporary Iranian poetry. He was also one of the main secretaries of the Writers' Association of Iran. Salehi is a prominent and well-known figure in contemporary Persian poetry.

Seyed Ali Salehi was born on 1 April 1954, in the village of Marghab in the Izeh Bakhtiari district of Khuzestan province to a farming family. His father was a farmer, poet, and Shahnameh reader. In 1974, he was expelled from school due to punishment and threats by the school and the authorities, and a year later, he returned to school and received a diploma in mathematics.

His first poems were published by Masjed Soleiman Oil Company in the local magazine of Abolghasem Halat.

Salehi is credited with establishing the mawj-e nab literary movement and promoting shi'r-e guftar (speech poetry) in Iran. In 1978, he received the Forugh Farrokhzad Award for poetry. He was nominated for the Nima Literary Award in 2010 but refused his nomination.
