= Azita Hajian =

Iranian actress (born 1958)

- آزیتا حاجیان
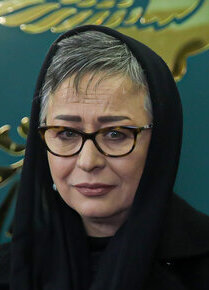
- Hajian at the 42nd Fajr Film Festival (2024)
- Born: 10 January 1958 (age 68); Malayer, Iran
- Education: Tehran University of Art
- Occupation: Actress
- Years active: 1990–present
- Spouses: Mohammad-Reza Sharifinia (m. 1980; div. 2010) Mohammad Karimi Harati (m. 2011)
- Children: Mehraveh; Melika

Azita Hajian (Persian: آزیتا حاجیان, born 10 January 1958) is an Iranian actress.

== Early life ==
She was born on 10 January 1958 in Malayer. She graduated in theatre acting and directing from the Faculty of Dramatic Arts in Tehran, Azita Hajian started stage acting in 1975 and film acting in 1989 with Thief of Dolls (Mohammad Reza Honarmand). Due to her theatrical background in the field of children and teenagers, her first films were in the same field. She is one of the major teachers of acting in Iran. She has also played in some TV series.

== Personal life ==
She married actor and film producer Mohamad Reza Sharifinia in 1980. Their two daughters, Mehraveh and Melika, are also actresses. Azita and Mohammad-Reza announced their divorce in December 2010 after nearly ten years of living separately.

Hajian boycotted the Fajr International Film Festival in light of the 2025–2026 Iranian protests.

== Selected filmography ==
- The Extraordinary Journey, 1990
- Avinar, 1991
- Dayanbakh, 1992
- The Path to Glory
- The Snowman, 1994 (released in ’97)
- The Red Ribbon, 1998
- The Dead Wave, 2000.
- Under the Smoky Roof, 2017.
- 180° Rule, 2020.
- The Notebook, 2024
