= Gholamhussein Lotfi =

Iranian actor, film director and screenwriter

Gholamhossein Lotfi
- غلامحسین لطفی
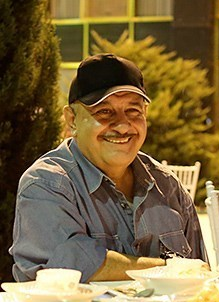
- Born: November 23, 1949 (age 76); Qazvin, Iran
- Occupations: Actor; Director
- Years active: 1973–present

Gholamhussein Lotfi (Persian: غلامحسین لطفی born 21 November 1949 in Qazvin) is an Iranian actor, film director and screenwriter.

He received an M.A. degree in acting and directorship and an honorary doctorate in theater. He has been in 20 films and many soap opera and has directed three movies, The Indians in 1978 and Pakbakhteh in 1995 and Mirror in 1985. His cinematic career started with acting in The Morning of Ash directed by Taghi Mokhtar in 1978.

== Filmography as actor and director ==
- The Indians (1978)
- Mirror (1985)
- Pakbakhteh (1995)

== Filmography as actor ==
- Athar's War (1978)
- Rasool, Abolghasem's son (1980)
- The Road (1981)
- The Lead (1987)
- Ali and the Jungle Ghoul (1990)
- The Last Act (1990)
- The Pickpockets don't go to heaven (1991)
- The GreatCircus (1991)
- Atal Matal Totule (1992)
- The Sting (1993)
- Falling Down (1993)
- Madly (1994)
- In Cold Blood (1994)
- Sweet Smell of Life (1994)
- The Man of Sun (1995)
- Cardboard Hotel (1996)
- The Night of Fox (1996)
- The Actor (1998)
- In-Love (2000)
- Under the City's Skin (TV series) (2001)
- Runaway Bride (2005)
- Online Murder (2005)
- The Doggy Afternoon (2009)
- Doctors' Building (2011)
- The relatively Bad Kids (2013)
- Pejman (2013)

== Filmography as Screenwriter ==
- My Golden Fish (2003)
