= Three Stars (TV series) =

Iranian TV program for Nowruz

- Genre: Nowruz; Talk show
- Created by: Ehsan Alikhani
- Directed by: Ehsan Alikhani
- Presented by: Ehsan Alikhani; Arash Zalipour
- Country of origin: Iran
- Original language: Persian
- No. of seasons: 3

Production
- Producer: Ehsan Alikhani
- Running time: 60–480 minutes
- Production company: IRIB TV3

Original release
- Network: IRIB TV3
- Release: 1 March 2014 – 20 March 2017

Related
- Orange Spring; New Era; The Event: Ninety and New

Three Stars (Persian: سه ستاره, "Se Setare") was a special Nowruz and New Year program of IRIB TV3 in 2014, 2016 and 2017, performed and produced by Ehsan Alikhani. This program selected the best TVs of the year with popular votes and was broadcast in 2014, 2016 and 2017 from March until the New Year. The first season of the program started on 1 March 2014 and ended on 20 March 2014, The second season started on 5 March 2016 and ended on 20 March 2016 and the third season started on 4 March 2017 and ended on 20 March 2017. This program was one of the most watched New Year programs of IRIB.

== About program ==
With the presence of the Three Stars elected by the people, along with dozens of prominent figures from the fields of cinema, television, sports, music, as well as the young elites of the country, this program was the special program of IRIB TV3's New Year program. Various sections were also broadcast in various scientific and cultural fields.

== Title music ==
Year of broadcast	Singer Name	Song name	Title type	Special description
2017	Mohammad-Reza Hedayati, Saman Jalili, Payam Azizi, Reza Sadeghi, Morteza Pashaei, Mehdi Yarrahi, Mohammad Alizadeh, Saeed Shahrooz	Fasle Bahar 3	Initial and final titration	Song and melody: Hassan Karimi / Arranger and mix: Moein Rahbar / Producer: Ehsan Alikhani / Director: Bushehri Brothers
2016	Mohammad-Reza Hedayati, Saman Jalili, Payam Azizi, Reza Sadeghi, Morteza Pashaei, Mehdi Yarrahi, Mohammad Alizadeh, Saeed Shahrooz	Fasle Bahar 3	Initial and final titration	Song and melody: Hassan Karimi / Arranger and mix: Moein Rahbar / Producer: Ehsan Alikhani / Director: Bushehri Brothers
2014	Payam Azizi, Reza Sadeghi, Morteza Pashaei, Mehdi Yarrahi, Mohammad Alizadeh, Saeed Shahrooz	Fasle Bahar	Initial and final titration	Song and melody: Hassan Karimi / Arranger and mix: Moein Rahbar / Producer: Ehsan Alikhani / Director: Bushehri Brothers
