= Orange Spring (TV series) =

Iranian TV program for Nowruz

- Genre: Nowruz; Talk show
- Created by: Ehsan Alikhani
- Directed by: Ehsan Alikhani
- Presented by: Ehsan Alikhani
- Country of origin: Iran
- Original language: Persian
- No. of seasons: 2
- No. of episodes: 5

Production
- Producer: Ehsan Alikhani
- Running time: 210–480 minutes
- Production company: IRIB TV3

Original release
- Network: IRIB TV3
- Release: 20 March 2015 – 20 March 2018

Related
- Three Stars; New Era; The Event: Ninety and New

Orange Spring (Persian: بهار نارنج, "Bahar Narenj") was a special Nowruz and New Year live program performed by Ehsan Alikhani, which aired on IRIB TV3 for two seasons for the years 1394 and 1397 in the Solar Hijri calendar. Orange Spring went on air of IRIB TV3 in the days close to the Iranian New Year and continued until the hours after the New Year, and was one of the most watched special programs of New Year of IRIB. The first season of this program was broadcast on 20 March 2015 until hours after the New Year Its second season was broadcast from 17 March 2018 until hours after the New Year on 20 March 2018. This talk show with the presence of famous guests and guests from the people tried to celebrate the New Year with the people in the last hours of the year and after the New Year, and entertain the viewers for hours.

== About program ==
This program was performed by Ehsan Alikhani and with the presence of tens of talents and prominent figures from various fields of science, culture, sports and art, as well as the young elites of the country, was a special program for New Year of IRIB TV3.

== Title music ==
Year of broadcast	Singer Name	Song name	Title type	Special description
2018	Mohammad-Reza Hedayati, Saman Jalili, Payam Azizi, Reza Sadeghi, Morteza Pashaei, Mehdi Yarrahi, Mohammad Alizadeh, Saeed Shahrooz	Fasle Bahar 3	Initial and final titration	Song and melody: Hassan Karimi / Arranger and mix: Moein Rahbar / Producer: Ehsan Alikhani / Director: Bushehri Brothers
2015	Mohammad-Reza Hedayati, Payam Azizi, Reza Sadeghi, Morteza Pashaei, Mehdi Yarrahi, Mohammad Alizadeh, Saeed Shahrooz	Fasle Bahar 2	Initial and final titration	Song and melody: Hassan Karimi / Arranger and mix: Moein Rahbar / Producer: Ehsan Alikhani / Director: Bushehri Brothers

== Guests ==
=== Season 1 (2015) ===
- Mehran Ghafourian
- Javad Razavian
- Jamshid Mashayekhi
- Carlos Queiroz
- Mohsen Tanabandeh
- Mohammad Alizadeh
- Babak Jahanbakhsh
- Mohammad-Reza Hedayati
- Majid Salehi
- Players of Iran men's national volleyball team

=== Season 2 (2018) ===
- Salar Aghili
- Mahsa Tahmasb
- Alireza Talischi
- Wall to Wall 2 actors
- Reza Rashidpour
- Macan Band
- Fereydoun Asraei
- Shahram Ghaedi
- Mohammad Bahrani
- Bahador Maleki
- Rambod Javan
- Puzzle Band
- Amir Tajik
- Javad Khiabani
- Farzad Farzin
- Mohammad Reza Moghadam
- Emad Talebzadeh
- Farshad Ahmadzadeh
- Kamal Kamyabinia
- Hossein Mahini
- Iman Ghiasi
- Mehdi Yarrahi
- Siamak Ansari
- Soroush Sehhat
- Bijan Banafshekhah
- Bachelors actors
- Milad Babaei
- Shahab Mozafari
- Behnam Bani

== Awards and nominations ==
Year	Award	Category	Result
2018	IRIB	Best program of New Year	Won
2018	Film News	IRIB's Best program of New Year	Won
