= The Event (Iranian TV program) =

Iranian TV program

- Genre: Talk show
- Created by: Reza Rashidpour
- Directed by: Siavash Saffarianpour; Mohammad Reza Rezaeian
- Presented by: Reza Rashidpour
- Country of origin: Iran
- Original language: Persian
- No. of seasons: 1

Production
- Producer: Mohammad Reza Rezaeian
- Camera setup: multi-camera
- Running time: 75 minutes

Original release
- Network: IRIB TV3
- Release: 6 March – 24 May 2020

The Event (Persian: اتفاق, "Etefagh") is an Iranian TV program hosted by Reza Rashidpour. The program dealt with topics in the fields of science, culture, society, politics and sports with the presence of prominent figures in each of these fields. The Event ended after the end of Ramadan on May 24, 2020.

The Event aired every Thursday and Friday night on IRIB TV3. It was produced by Mohammad Reza Rezaeian and directed by Siavash Saffarianpour and Mohammad Reza Rezaeian.

== Guests ==
Episode	Guest	Job
1	Arsha Aghdasi	Stunt person
1	Bahram Ataei	Criminal Detective
1	Mehdi Parsa	Traveler
1	Mohsen Eslamzadeh	Documentary filmmaker
2	Vafa Sedghi	Payam Satellite Project Manager
2	Morteza Barari	Head of the Iranian Space Agency
2	Javad Gharaei	Documentary filmmaker and Traveler
2	Mohammad Reza Nowruzi	Experimenter
2	Ali Khalighi	Carpet designer
3	Seyed Hadi Motamedi	Psychiatrist
3	Ehsan Goodarzi	Artist
4	Hamid Jadiri Khodashenas	Eclipse seeker
4	Sorour Hardani	Teacher
5	Afsaneh Ehsani	Entrepreneur
5	Zahra Zojaji	Entrepreneur
5	Reyhaneh Farshchi	Entrepreneur
6	Mohammad Hossein Nasr Isfahani	Director of Royan Research Institute, Isfahan
7	Mohammad Moama	Pilot and writer
7	Nahid Kloshani	Entrepreneur
8	Mohammad Hossein Kabadi	Head of Red Crescent Mountain and Marine Rescue
8	Khayyam Rahmani	Devoted soldier
9	Hamid Reza Ahmadi	Entrepreneur
10	Mehdi Tale Masouleh	Doctor
11	Mehdi Zare	Seismologist
12	Siroos Borzoo	Journalist
13	Ahad Vazifeh	Head of the National Center for Drought and Crisis Management of the Meteorological Organization
14	Mohammad Barzegari	Adventure Bird
15	Kazem Kooh Karam	Journalist

== The Event: Ninety and New ==
The Event: Ninety and New
- Genre: Nowruz; Talk show
- Created by: Reza Rashidpour
- Directed by: Siavash Saffarianpour; Mohammad Reza Rezaeian
- Presented by: Reza Rashidpour; Parviz Neshat; Hamid Torabian
- Country of origin: Iran
- Original language: Persian
- No. of seasons: 1
- No. of episodes: 3

Production
- Producer: Mohammad Reza Rezaeian
- Camera setup: multi-camera
- Running time: 135–520 minutes

Original release
- Network: IRIB TV3
- Release: 18 March – 20 March 2020

Related
- Three Stars; Orange Spring; New Era

The Event: Ninety and New is a special Nowruz live program performed by Reza Rashidpour, which aired on IRIB TV3 in the days close to the 1399 Iranian year and continued until hours after New Year. This talk show program celebrated the New Year with the people in the last hours of the year and after New Year, with the presence of famous guests and guests from the people. The first season of this program started on 18 March 2020 and ended on 20 March 2020.

This program, performed by Reza Rashidpour and attended by dozens of prominent figures from various fields of science, culture, sports and art, as well as the young elites of the country, were the special guests of the program of the New Year of IRIB TV3.

=== Title music ===
Year of broadcast	Singer Name	Song name	Title type	Special description
2020	Hojjat Ashrafzadeh	Mehrabane Mani	Initial and final titration	Songwriter: Mohammad Mubaraki

=== The Event: Ninety and New guests ===
Episode	Guest Name	Job	Picture
1	Mehdi Sepehr	Singer	
1	Kamran Shahraki	Technician	
1	Khajeh Ali	Technician	
1	Babak Afra	Singer	
1	Sahar Zakaria	Actress	
1	Amir Tajik	Singer	
1	Jahan Afrooz Najafvand	Carpet weaver	
1	Behnam Tashakkor	Actor	
1	Bijan Banafshekhah	Actor	
1	Hojjat Ashrafzadeh	Singer	
1	Reza Sadeghi	Singer	
1	Rahim Shahriari	Singer	
1	Morteza Derakhshan	Presenter	
1	Meysam Fallah	Police	
1	Asghar Mirzaei	Pakban	
1	Reza Shafiei Jam	Actor	
1	Alireza Pourostad	Singer	
2	Meysam Ebrahimi	Singer	
2	Mohammad Hassan Davoudi	One of the founders of the Sobhe Rooyesh School for Working Children	
2	Fereshteh Karimi	Futsal player	
2	Ali Akbar Pourjamshidian	Brigadier General	
2	Nima Shahrokh Shahi	Actor	
2	Linda Kiani	Actress	
2	Puzzle Band	Music band	
2	Shahab Moradi	Clergy	
2	Najmuddin Shariati	Presenter	
2	Seyed Hamid Reza Barghaei	Poet	
2	Wife and child of martyr pilot Assadollah Barbari		
2	Hadadi	Photographer	
2	Khosravi Nejad	Photographer	
2	Uncle Shamsullah	Benevolent shoemaker	
2	Milad Keymaram	Actor	
2	Neshat Jahandari	Pilot	
2	Vahid Shahpasandi	Pilot	
2	Fattah	Engineer	
2	Jahani	Colonel	
2	Sina Sarlak	Singer	
2	Kazemi	Teacher and van driver	
2	Saeed Fathi Roshan	Magician	
3	Siavash Saffarianpour	Presenter, producer, director, journalist	
3	Mohammad-Reza Sharifinia	Actor	

=== Awards and nominations ===
Year	Award	Category	Result
۱۳۹۹	IRIB	Best New Year program of IRIB from the people's point of view	Won
