= Mesle Mah =

Iranian TV program for Ramadan

- Genre: Social; Religious; Talk show
- Created by: Hadi Ashtiani
- Directed by: Mohammad Reza Khandan
- Presented by: Resalat Bouzari
- Country of origin: Iran
- Original language: Persian
- No. of seasons: 3
- No. of episodes: 52

Production
- Producer: Hadi Ashtiani
- Running time: About 60 minutes
- Production company: IRIB

Original release
- Network: IRIB TV3
- Release: 25 April 2020 – present

Mesle Mah (Persian: مثل ماه, transl. Like the moon) is a special iftar program of IRIB TV3, Hosted By Resalat Bouzari, which airs daily with a positive, kind and hopeful approach and focuses on issues such as self-sacrifice and forgiveness during the month of Ramadan from 19:00 until around the Maghrib Adhan. This program replaced Mah-e Asal in Ramadan 2020. This program narrates the lives of the guests invited to the program; Guests from all over the country attend the event and talk about their life events.

The guests of the program are usually those who have a story to tell. An event that has affected their lives and taken on the color and smell of God and somehow brought them closer to God.

Inviting different personalities, making social and spiritual items, and introducing the virtues of Ali al-Ridha, along with playing a short film of these virtues, are other parts of this special program of IRIB TV3.

== Title music ==
Year of broadcast	Singer Name	Song name	Title type	Special description
2022	Mohammad Motamedi	Mesle Mah	Opening titration	Lyrics and Melody: Milad Erfanpour | Arranged by: Amir Hossein Akbarshahi | Mix: Saeed Shayan
2022	Amir Haghighat	Diroozo Bargardoun	Final titration	Lyrics and Melody: Milad Erfanpour | Arranged and mixed by: Amir Hossein Akbarshahi
2021	Garsha Rezaei	Mesle Mah	Opening titration	Lyrics: Ali Bahraini | Music: Garsha Rezaei
2021	Mohsen Chavoshi	Taghe Soraya	Final titration	Song, composition and arrangement: Mohsen Chavoshi
2020	Mohsen Chavoshi	Zamire Khodsar	Opening titration	Song, composition and arrangement: Mohsen Chavoshi
2020	Amir Teymouri	Mesle Mah	Final titration	Song: Amir Teymouri | Song: Hossein Nejabat | Arrangement: Ali Vahid
2020	Mohsen Chavoshi	Taghe Soraya	Opening titration of Ghadr Nights	Song, composition and arrangement: Mohsen Chavoshi

== Summary of seasons ==
Season	Main broadcast		Presenter
Season	First broadcast	Last broadcast	Presenter
1	25 April 2020	25 May 2020	Resalat Bouzari
2	15 April 2021	13 May 2021	Resalat Bouzari
3	3 April 2022	3 May 2022	Resalat Bouzari

== Margins ==
=== Criticism of replacement with Mah-e Asal ===
After replacing Mesle Mah with Mah-e Asal and also making similar Mah-e Asal programs on IRIB networks during Ramadan 2020, there were criticisms of such programs and TV managers that make the replacement of popular and successful programs without the necessary quality. Part of the criticism was that in Ramadan 2020, every network made a program in the format of the Mah-e Asal and the presenter tried to perform like Ehsan Alikhani, but they failed.

Responding to the criticism, the host, Resalat Bouzari, said:

My brother Ehsan Alikhani and I have 2 different forms and 2 different worlds in performance, and I think connecting these two worlds in performance is very meaningless. On the other hand, for everyone else who was in my place, this analogy would happen to him, as if Ehsan Alikhani wanted to perform "Mokhatabe Khas", a kind of judgment would be made about what he had not seen before. The "Mah-e Asal" program was performed by other people even in some years, and I do not have a mentality now that when Alikhani took over the performance, there were any reactions or attacks, but this is a judgment of a program like "Mesle Mah" that the first year Experiencing its own production, I find it unfair. I'm not saying be sure to compare us to the first year of the "Mah-e Asal", but at least compare it to the fifth and sixth years, not the twelfth year and the branded program.
