= Shahab Moradi =

Iranian television preacher and lecturer

- شهاب مرادی
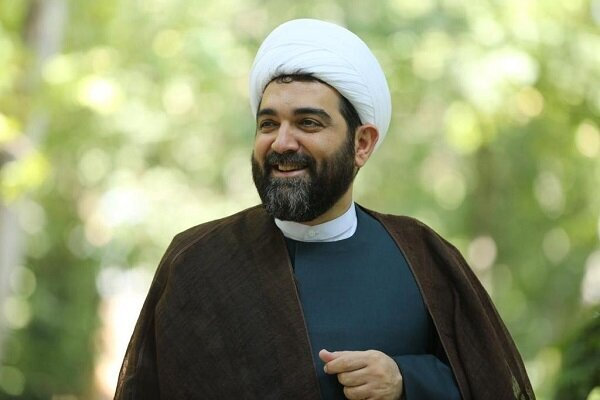
- Shahab Moradi
- Born: March 12, 1972 (age 54); Tehran, Iran
- Education: Tehran Seminary; Qom Seminary
- Occupations: Clergyman; Preacher; Psychologist; University lecturer; Consultant
- Known for: Cultural, media, and family initiatives
- Website: shahab-moradi.ir

Shahab Moradi (/ʃæhɒb moʊrɒdi/; Persian: شهاب مرادی; born in Tehran) is an Iranian clergyman, preacher, psychologist, public speaker, and university lecturer. He has appeared in different programs on Islamic Republic of Iran Broadcasting as an expert since 2000.

== Early life and education ==
Shahab Moradi began his seminary education in Tehran at the Ghaem Seminary in Chizar, under the supervision of Ayatollah Sayyid Ali Asghar Hashemi Olya. He subsequently studied for several years at the Ayatollah Mojtahedi Seminary, under Ayatollah Ahmad Mojtahedi Tehrani. During this period, his teachers included Hashemi Olya and Mojtahedi Tehrani.

After completing his preliminary studies, Moradi studied Sharh al-Lum'a, a text of Islamic jurisprudence within the Ja'fari school, under Hojjatoleslam Manteghi, Ayatollah Rezvani (Joorabchi), the late Hojjatoleslam Abolqasem Mohajeri, and the late Hojjatoleslam Mohammad Karimi (known as Morshed-e Soluk).

He continued his education at the advanced seminary level, studying Rasa'il, Makasib, and Kifaya under the late Ayatollah Hossein Asgari and the late Ayatollah Sayyid Fattah Hashemi Tabrizi. During the same period, Moradi maintained a particularly close and long-standing teacher–student relationship with the late Ayatollah Sayyid Ebrahim Khosrowshahi, attending his private lessons for several years.

After completing the advanced seminary curriculum, Moradi pursued advanced jurisprudence (dars-e kharej fiqh). In Tehran, he attended lectures by Ayatollah Sayyid Ali Asghar Hashemi Olya and Grand Ayatollah Ali Khamenei. In Qom, he attended lectures by Grand Ayatollah Hossein Wahid Khorasani, the late Grand Ayatollah Jawad Tabrizi, and the late Grand Ayatollah Mohammad Fazel Lankarani. He attended Grand Ayatollah Ali Khamenei's advanced jurisprudence lectures for many years.

Shahab Moradi also received written authorizations to act as a representative in matters of al-umur al-hisbiyya (religiously mandated affairs whose administration requires the authorization or supervision of a qualified Islamic jurist) from Grand Ayatollah Ali Khamenei and Grand Ayatollah Mohammad Fazel Lankarani.

== Lectures ==
=== Domestic lectures ===
Shahab Moradi has delivered religious and educational lectures in cities across Iran, at Islamic shrines, mosques, religious gatherings, universities, cultural institutions, and governmental and industrial organizations. Alongside occasions such as Ramadan, Muharram, and the Fatimiyya commemorations, his lectures have covered ethics, parenting, marriage, family relationships, practical life skills, and social concerns.

His engagements have included the Imam Reza Shrine in Mashhad, the Fatima Masumeh Shrine in Qom, the Shah Cheragh shrine in Shiraz, the Shah Abdol-Azim Shrine in Rey, gatherings in Tehran and Shemiran, and programmes in Yazd, Isfahan, Tabriz, Bushehr, and other cities. He has also spoken to university students, families, and participants in invited academic and organizational events.

Moradi's wider public educational activities have included environmental responsibility, tree planting, and water conservation. Members of his Classes for Singles participated in organized planting programmes, including a 2020 event involving 10,000 trees reported by the Forests, Range and Watershed Management Organization and another planting programme in 2021. Environmental specialists have also commented on his contributions to promoting green spaces and environmental awareness. In interviews, Moradi has emphasized the importance of watershed management for water scarcity and environmental challenges.

=== International lectures in various countries ===
Moradi has undertaken religious speaking engagements outside Iran for Iranian communities, Muslim congregations, students, and other participants in religious and cultural programmes. Reports document lectures in cities across Europe and Asia.

European locations include Hamburg, Berlin, Frankfurt and Munich, Darmstadt, Wiesbaden, Vienna, and Paris. In the Netherlands, the reported locations include The Hague, Amsterdam, Delft, and Rotterdam. In Lisbon, he delivered lectures for Iranian residents at religious and community gatherings.

In East and South Asia, the places reported include Kuala Lumpur, Beijing, Tianjin, Shanghai, New Delhi, Hyderabad, and Agra. Other locations include Dushanbe, Baku, Ankara, Istanbul, Famagusta, and Tunis.

At Eastern Mediterranean University (EMU) in Famagusta, Moradi gave three evenings of lectures and question-and-answer sessions for Iranian students at the invitation of an academic and cultural association. In West Asia, reports and accounts refer to lectures in Muscat, Salalah, Kuwait City, Manama and Muharraq, Mecca, Medina, Dubai, Karbala, Baghdad, Kadhimiya, and Najaf.

=== Funeral and memorial lectures ===
Moradi has also given religious addresses at funeral and memorial services for people in Iranian culture, the arts, media, and sports. Those he has commemorated include actor Khosrow Shakibai, singer Morteza Pashaei, basketball player Aidin Nikkhah Bahrami, and environmentalist and television presenter Mohammad Ali Inanloo. In an interview published in 2016, Moradi recalled several of the memorial ceremonies at which he had spoken.

In July 2026, Moradi gave a memorial address for television presenter Farzad Jamshidi at Jameh Imam Sajjad Mosque in Tehran. Colleagues, fellow presenters, and people associated with Jamshidi's television career attended and shared their recollections.

His memorial speaking engagements have also included gatherings for victims of major disasters and accidents. He spoke at a fortieth-day commemoration in Bam for victims of the 2003 Bam earthquake, an occasion he later recalled in an interview. A fortieth-day gathering involving Moradi was also announced for those affected by the 2017 Iran–Iraq earthquake in Kermanshah Province.

Following the 2012 bus accident in which 26 school students from Borujen lost their lives, Moradi met their grieving classmates and teachers in an extended gathering. Mehr News Agency reported that he encouraged the students to share memories and express their grief, then spoke with them about bereavement, religious and emotional questions, and everyday safety. Individual discussions with students and teachers continued for several hours.

In June 2022, Moradi addressed a public memorial ceremony in Yazd for victims of the Mashhad–Yazd train accident. Held at the shrine of Imamzadeh Seyyed Jafar Mohammad, the ceremony brought together residents, religious figures, and provincial officials. According to a report by the Islamic Republic News Agency (IRNA), he spoke about safety in different dimensions of life, particularly cultural and social responsibilities and the role of younger generations in preventing harm.

On 3 January 2020, after the death of Iranian military commander Qasem Soleimani, Moradi delivered a memorial address at the Imam Reza Shrine in Mashhad. The gathering was part of the shrine's commemorative programme, and his participation was documented by the Islamic Republic of Iran Broadcasting's radio archive and its news service.

Moradi also delivered a memorial sermon for the wife and two children of Esmaeil Saghab Esfahani, an Iranian vice president, after their deaths in a road accident. The service took place at Noor Mosque in Tehran on 8 December 2025, with President Masoud Pezeshkian, cabinet ministers, and other senior officials in attendance. Tabnak's report on the ceremony explicitly identified Moradi as its speaker and published photographs of the event.

=== Audience reception ===
News reports have described substantial attendance at Moradi's lectures inside and outside Iran, including notable participation by younger audiences. During the Muharram programmes at the Islamic Centre of Hamburg in 2011, Iran's consul general reported more than 3,000 attendees at Moradi's lectures. The centre's executive deputy said participation had more than doubled compared with previous years; both accounts highlighted the presence of young people and women.

In Karbala, a week of lectures at the shrines of Imam Hussein and Abbas ibn Ali attracted large numbers of pilgrims. An official of the Iranian pilgrimage mission reported crowded courtyards and insufficient seating and sound facilities for the attendance. In Iran, Aghigh described a positive response from young people and teenagers during five nights of lectures at Jameh Mahdieh Mosque in Shemiran. Roozplus also reported a positive reception from pilgrims on the opening night of a seven-night lecture series at the Imam Reza Shrine in September 2026.

=== Moradi's speaking style ===
Reports on Moradi's lectures have described conversational and accessible language, attention to listeners' reactions, and the use of religious teachings to address practical subjects such as parenting, marriage, family relationships, and social conduct.

In its report on his Fatimiyya lectures at Jameh Mahdieh Mosque, Aghigh emphasized his persuasive manner, coherent presentation, respect for listeners, and responsiveness to the audience. It also described his use of Islamic narrations to communicate historical, educational, and spiritual subjects to different age groups. In an interview published in Hamshahri's Ayyeh magazine, Moradi stressed the value of familiar language, avoiding unnecessary technical terms, patiently answering questions, and maintaining a friendly and direct connection with participants.

=== Post-lecture discussions ===
Moradi has often continued conversations with audience members after the formal conclusion of his sermons. Reports describe discussions that can last for hours and cover religious, intellectual, educational, family, social, and personal questions.

Accounts of the 2011 Muharram gatherings in Hamburg described question-and-answer sessions and consultations after the lectures, particularly with younger attendees. In Karbala, an official of the Iranian pilgrimage mission said pilgrims continued to seek discussion and guidance for as long as two hours after Moradi's sermons.

In July 2026, Roozplus published a firsthand report titled "The End of the Session, the Beginning of Conversations with Shahab Moradi". The journalist described children, teenagers, parents, and older participants remaining after a lecture in Tehran to discuss parenting, relationships, social issues, and personal concerns. According to the report, these conversations lasted longer than the sermon itself. Hamshahri's Ayyeh magazine likewise described listeners gathering around Moradi after lectures and classes, sometimes for several hours, and recorded his emphasis on patient listening, clear answers, and friendly interaction.

== Television career ==
Shahab Moradi began appearing on Iranian television in 2000, contributing to religious and special-occasion segments on the Islamic Republic of Iran News Network (IRINN). In 2000 and 2001, these were short, prerecorded segments broadcast between news bulletins rather than as a separately titled programme. During Ramadan in 2003 and 2004, he appeared in the live programme Meyad-e Shabaneh (میعاد شبانه), produced by the social affairs department of IRIB TV1. Keyvan Bakhshi and Amir-Hossein Khorramshahi produced the 2003 series, while the late Seyyed Mostafa Mousavi produced the 2004 series. Some of the dawn broadcasts during this period originated in Iraq. Moradi has also recalled a live broadcast of one of his sermons from the Imam Husayn Shrine on IRIB TV3.

=== Regular and principal television appearances ===
Moradi was a leading, regular expert on Mardom-e Iran Salam (مردم ایران سلام; Hello, People of Iran), broadcast on IRIB TV2 in the Iranian calendar years 1385 and 1386 (2006–2008). The programme was produced and presented by Mohammad Reza Shahidifard and became a prominent and widely watched Iranian television talk show. Moradi continued working with Shahidifard on the live programme Park-e Mellat (پارک ملت; Mellat Park) on IRIB TV1 in 2011, again in a central and regular expert role. The evening programme built on the approach to social discussion developed in Mardom-e Iran Salam. Shahidifard has discussed the development and production of these programmes in interviews.

Ayeneh-Khaneh (آیینه‌خانه; House of Mirrors) was developed for IRIB TV2 around Moradi's participation and began airing in 2013. He remained the programme's lead expert throughout its various seasons. Resalat Bouzari presented its early seasons. The programme addressed family life, marriage, interpersonal relationships, parenting, lifestyle and social ethics; some seasons also included discussions with students and young adults. Seyyed Ali Ahmadi and Seyyed Majid Akrami were among its producers. Moradi's appearances on the programme continued through the Iranian calendar year 1402 (2023–2024).

Moradi was the lead expert throughout the first season of Piyadeh Amadeim (پیاده آمده‌ایم; We Came on Foot), a live IRIB TV1 programme that ran for ten nights. In its second season, broadcast from Karbala, he was joined by Mohammad Reza Zaeri and Ali Sarlak as fellow experts. He also served as a regular lead expert on the live IRIB TV3 morning show Salam Sobh Bekheyr (سلام صبح بخیر; Hello, Good Morning) during the Iranian calendar years 1400–1404 (2021–2026), discussing family, parenting and social issues.

=== Television broadcasts of Classes for Singles ===
Edited selections from Moradi's Classes for Singles (کلاس مجردها) were broadcast on IRINN from 2018 to 2021 and on IRIB TV3 from 2022 to 2026, corresponding to the Iranian calendar years 1397–1400 and 1401–1404 respectively. These prerecorded programmes condensed approximately four-hour classes into short episodes, generally lasting 15 minutes or less. Seyyed Majid Akrami was a producer of the television version.

=== Other television appearances ===
In addition to his regular appearances, Moradi has appeared on religious, family, cultural and entertainment programmes. These include In Shabha (این شب‌ها) with Ali Dorostkar; Mah-e Asal (ماه عسل; Honeymoon) and the 2012 Nowruz special with Ehsan Alikhani; Khandevaneh (خندوانه) with Rambod Javan; Ketab Baz (کتاب‌باز; Bookworm) with Soroush Sehhat; and Hala Khorshid (حالا خورشید) and Ettefagh (اتفاق) with Reza Rashidpour. He appeared three times on Khandevaneh and on two occasions on Ketab Baz, both of which were prerecorded programmes.

His other appearances include the religious and special-occasion programmes Baran, Fasl-e No, Shabhaye Roshan, Kuy-e Mohabbat, Atr-e Ramadan, Mah-e Man, Be Ofogh-e Falastin and Hosseiniyeh Moalla. He joined the seventh season of Hosseiniyeh Moalla as a religious expert.

=== Television programmes ===
==== Programmes with principal or regular appearances ====
Programme	Channel	Years of appearance	Moradi's role	Broadcast format	Sources
Meyad-e Shabaneh (میعاد شبانه)	IRIB TV1	2003–2004 (1382–1383 SH)	Religious expert	Live	
Mardom-e Iran Salam (مردم ایران سلام)	IRIB TV2	2006–2008 (1385–1386 SH)	Lead expert (regular)	Live	
Park-e Mellat (پارک ملت)	IRIB TV1	2011–2012 (1390 SH)	Lead expert (regular)	Live	
Ayeneh-Khaneh (آیینه‌خانه)	IRIB TV2	2013–2024 (1392–1402 SH)	Lead expert (regular); programme developed around his participation	Live	
Piyadeh Amadeim (پیاده آمده‌ایم)	IRIB TV1	2016–2018 (1395–1396 SH)	Principal expert in the first season; one of the experts in the second	Live	
Salam Sobh Bekheyr (سلام صبح بخیر)	IRIB TV3	2021–2026 (1400–1404 SH)	Lead expert (regular)	Live	
Classes for Singles (کلاس مجردها)	IRINN; IRIB TV3	2018–2026 (1397–1404 SH)	Instructor and central figure	Prerecorded; edited classroom excerpts	

==== Other programmes and appearances ====
Programme	Channel	Year of appearance	Broadcast format	Sources
Untitled special-occasion segments	IRINN	2000–2002 (1379–1380 SH)	Prerecorded	
Baharestan (بهارستان)	IRIB Tehran	Nowruz 2008	Prerecorded short segments	Contemporary reporting on Nowruz programming
Mah-e Asal (ماه عسل)	IRIB TV3	2008 (1387 SH)	Live	—
Man, To, Oo (من، تو، او)	IRIB TV3	2008 (1387 SH)	Listed among programme experts; format unspecified	
In Shabha (این شب‌ها)	IRIB TV1	2009–2011 (1388–1389 SH); later appearances	Live	
Salam Tehran (سلام تهران)	IRIB Tehran	2010–2011 (1389 SH)	Live	
Ta Niyayesh (تا نیایش)	IRIB Tehran	2011–2012 (1390 SH)	Live	
Nowruz television special hosted by Ehsan Alikhani	IRIB TV2	Nowruz 2012	Live	
Khosha Shiraz (خوشا شیراز)	IRIB Fars	2012–2013 (1391 SH)	Televised interview	—
Bagh-e Irani (باغ ایرانی)	IRIB Tehran	Nowruz 2013	Live	—
Baran (باران)	IRIB Quran	2013–2014 (1392 SH)	Live	
Fasl-e No (فصل نو)	IRIB Quran	2013–2014 (1392 SH)	Live	
Pabous (پابوس)	IRIB TV2	2013–2014 (1392 SH)	Live	
Khandevaneh (خندوانه)	IRIB Nasim	2014 and 2016	Prerecorded; three appearances	
Shabhaye Roshan (شب‌های روشن)	IRIB TV2	Ramadan 2015	Live	
Kuy-e Mohabbat (کوی محبت)	IRIB TV2	2016 and 2018	Live	
Ketab Baz (کتاب‌باز)	IRIB Nasim	2017–2018 and 2020–2021 (1396 and 1399 SH)	Prerecorded	
Hala Khorshid (حالا خورشید)	IRIB TV3	2018	Live	
Oghyanus-e Aram (اقیانوس آرام)	IRIB TV2	2018	Live	
Atr-e Ramadan (عطر رمضان)	IRIB Quran	2019	Live	
Ettefagh 99 (اتفاق نود و نه)	IRIB TV3	Nowruz 2020	Live	
Eyvan-e Behesht (ایوان بهشت)	IRIB TV2	2021–2022 (1400 SH)	Broadcast of a recorded sermon	
Mah-e Man (ماه من)	IRIB TV3	2022 and 2024	Live	
Be Ofogh-e Falastin (به افق فلسطین)	IRIB Ofogh	2023	Live	
Naghl o Noghl (نقل و نقل)	IRIB TV2	2023	Live	—
Yalda-ye Irani (یلدای ایرانی)	IRIB TV2	2023	Live	—
Sobhaneh Irani (صبحانه ایرانی)	IRIB TV2	2024–2026 (1403–1404 SH)	Live	—
Hosseiniyeh Moalla (حسینیه معلی)	IRIB TV3	2025 (1403 SH)	Live; religious expert in season seven	
Salam Khabarnegar (سلام خبرنگار)	IRINN	2025 (1403 SH)	Live	—
Zamaneh (زمانه)	IRIB TV2	2025–2026 (1404 SH)	Live	—

=== Broadcasts of sermons and religious ceremonies ===
Moradi's sermons and participation in religious ceremonies have also been televised, both live and in recorded form. These broadcasts include Ramadan programmes, Laylat al-Qadr ceremonies and religious addresses from the Imam Husayn and Imam Reza shrines. One documented example was the broadcast on IRIB Salamat of a ceremony at the Imam Reza Shrine on the 23rd night of Ramadan 1446 AH, in March 2025, in which Moradi delivered an address and led the Quran-on-the-head ritual.

== Public Service and Government Roles ==
=== Ministry of Interior and Supreme Audit Court ===
Moradi began serving as an adviser to the Minister of Interior and a member of the Research Council of the Iranian Ministry of Interior in 2005. By July 2006, he was also serving as head of the ministry's Group of Young Advisers. In June 2007, Interior Minister Mostafa Pourmohammadi appointed him as an adviser to the minister and head of the ministry's Political Training Center.

In 2008, during Pourmohammadi's tenure, Moradi proposed consolidating the ministry's dispersed educational and research bodies into a single institution, in accordance with the structural reforms required under Iran's Fourth Development Plan. He subsequently pursued the preparation of its organizational structure and the administrative approval process and became the founder and first president of the newly established Center for Studies, Research and Training of the Ministry of Interior.

The new center integrated the ministry's previously dispersed educational and research units, linking applied research and professional training with the administrative needs of the ministry, provincial administrations and county administrations.

Concurrently, the Group of Young Advisers focused primarily on identifying and developing promising younger personnel already working within the ministry and its provincial and county administrations, rather than relying on factional or predominantly external recruitment. A smaller number of individuals were recruited from outside the ministry. Among them was Malek Rahmati, whom Moradi invited to begin his administrative career in his office after completing his studies. Rahmati later served as governor-general of East Azerbaijan province and was killed in the 2024 Varzaqan helicopter crash.

Across two periods of service, Moradi's work as an adviser to the Minister of Interior overlapped with the tenures of Mostafa Pourmohammadi, Seyyed Mehdi Hashemi as acting minister, Ali Kordan, Kamran Daneshjoo as acting minister, Sadegh Mahsouli, Mostafa Mohammad-Najjar, Abdolreza Rahmani Fazli and Ahmad Vahidi. He returned to the Ministry of Interior in 2017 and continued as an adviser during the tenures of Rahmani Fazli and Vahidi until September 2022. He was subsequently appointed as an adviser to the president of the Supreme Audit Court of Iran.

=== Tehran municipal administration ===
From 2008 until his appointment as president of the organization in 2013, Moradi was a member of the Board of Directors of the Cultural and Art Organization of Tehran Municipality. During this period, he also advised Tehran Mayor Mohammad Bagher Ghalibaf on cultural and social matters.

On 26 November 2013, Moradi was appointed president of the Cultural and Art Organization of Tehran Municipality, succeeding Amir Khorakian. The formal handover ceremony was held on 1 December 2013.

Moradi held the presidency until April 2015, when Mahmoud Salahi succeeded him. Following the end of his presidency, Ghalibaf appointed him as an adviser to the Mayor of Tehran, a position he held until returning to the Ministry of Interior in 2017.

== Other cultural, media, and legal roles ==
Earlier in his career, Moradi spent approximately five years as a deputy at the Islamic Revolution Document Center and headed its publishing division. During his tenure, he initiated the systematic collection and publication of memoirs by veterans of the Islamic Republic of Iran Army Ground Forces, contributing to the documentation of the army's role in the Iran–Iraq War.

On 1 October 2013, Ali Jannati, then Minister of Culture and Islamic Guidance, appointed Moradi as a member of the Film Screening Permit Council following a proposal from the head of the Cinema Organization of Iran. Moradi withdrew from the council before it formally began its work, explaining that membership required more available time than he could provide.

In October 2011, Moradi was selected as a member of the Tehran Province Press Court Jury under Article 36 of Iran's Press Law.

== Family Education and Social Initiatives ==
Moradi's Kelas Mojarrad-ha ("Classes for Singles") is a free educational programme based on dialogue and interaction with participants. Its subjects extend beyond preparation for marriage to include lifestyle, critical thinking, and questions raised by young adults. An August 2014 report described most participants as university students or graduates, although no academic qualification was required for admission, and recorded 89 sessions across the programme's first three courses. The programme also held sessions in university settings. In October 2014, its 94th session was announced at the University of Tehran's Ferdowsi Hall, following an invitation from the university's Office of the Supreme Leader's Representative, with attendance open to all students.

The free Khanevadeh Nowpa workshops address the early years of married life through discussions of communication between spouses, relationships with relatives, religious and ethical questions, parenting, and household finances. A 2013 report described courses comprising at least ten weekly sessions, attended jointly by both spouses. Moradi explained that initial assessments and participants' questions helped determine the priorities and direction of discussions. The workshops emphasized preventive education, while couples experiencing a marital crisis were advised to seek counselling. Former participants also volunteered to help organize subsequent courses.

An earlier explanation of the programme, published in 2010, emphasized the importance of recognizing newly married couples as an independent family while maintaining relationships with their families of origin. It advocated giving couples time, understanding, and support as they developed their shared family identity.

In July 2026, Moradi introduced Nowgofteh, a free educational and dialogue-based programme for adolescents at the Zendegi Behtar ("Better Life") Specialized Counselling Centre. Announced on 25 Tir 1405, the programme held its first boys' session on 26 Tir and its first girls' session on 1 Mordad. Avash described it as a further educational initiative following Classes for Singles and Khanevadeh Nowpa, extending his programmes to a younger age group.

Moradi is a co-founder and board member of the Family Consolidation Foundation (Bonyad-e Tahkim-e Khanevadeh), a non-governmental organization focused on strengthening marital stability and reducing divorce rates.

Moradi has advocated an experiential rather than prohibitive approach to young people's use of digital games. In a 2025 interview, he argued that parents and educators should understand and experience the media used by younger generations before judging it, stating that meaningful engagement with young people requires familiarity with their interests and circumstances. He described recreation as a legitimate human need and advised parents to allow children to play their preferred games within managed time limits while also participating alongside them.

=== Opposition to the promotion of polygamy ===
In a 2019 interview, Moradi argued that promoting polygamy was neither necessary nor a social priority and that activists working on family and marriage should instead focus on encouraging unmarried people to marry and form families. He also recounted a meeting of family activists with Ali Khamenei, saying that Khamenei had expressed reservations about polygamy and did not support recommending it. The interview subsequently received further coverage from the specialized Ijtihad Network, and Moradi's account was cited by Fars News Agency in later reporting on the controversy over Khamenei's position on promoting polygamy.

== Philanthropy ==
In 2013, Moradi founded the Madar-e Mehraban Foundation (Charity No. 32689), establishing its legal NGO structure based on the name of Khadija bint Khuwaylid after inviting a board of founders to join the initiative. Dedicated to combating childhood hunger and malnutrition across Iran, the foundation focuses primarily on the direct provision of meals and nutritional support for impoverished children. Built on a strictly non-profit and genuinely non-governmental framework, it operates without reliance on state budgets or commercial activities. Demonstrating an institutional model of philanthropy that prioritizes organizational sustainability over personal branding, Moradi intentionally minimized his own prominence in public campaigns, structuring it as an autonomous, community-driven organization. The foundation operates under a strict policy of financial segregation: 100% of public donations are allocated directly to food provision, while administrative and operational expenses are funded separately through designated sponsors. Beyond immediate relief—such as distributing daily nutritional snacks in schools—the initiative emphasizes dignity-preserving aid delivery to protect the self-respect of the children, alongside active youth volunteer engagement.

=== Nazri Ducks ===
In 2020, during the COVID-19 pandemic, Shahab Moradi launched the “Nazri Ducks” initiative to support low-income rural families. The name refers to the Iranian concept of nazri, a votive offering associated with a religious vow. In Iranian tradition, nazri food may be shared with both rich and poor, rather than being limited to recipients of charitable aid. Under the initiative, live ducks were provided to needy rural families, allowing them to use the eggs and breed and raise the ducks for household consumption. ISCA News later described the initiative as supporting production and entrepreneurship.

== Promoting a culture of kindness ==
Shahab Moradi considers kindness to be the most important need of individuals and society. In his speeches, television appearances, and cultural activities, he has spoken about kindness, empathy, and consideration for others. In 2014, during his presidency of the Cultural and Artistic Organization of Tehran Municipality, he adopted "Tehran, City of Kindness" as a guiding slogan for the organization's cultural activities.

In the early 2010s, some of Moradi's students and followers used the title "Teacher of Kindness" to refer to him on social media. In November 2014, Asr Iran published a report featuring posts by participants in his "Classes for Singles", documenting the use of the hashtag "#استاد_مهربانی" ("Teacher of Kindness") and the expression "Teacher of Kindnesses". In 2015, some media reports also referred to Moradi as "the beloved sheikh of young people".

The theme of kindness has also been reflected in his social and charitable activities. These include helping to organize a fundraising event and a charity screening of the film The Corridor, directed by Behrouz Shoeibi, to help secure the release of people sentenced to qisas. His activities have also included holding free educational classes and courses on marriage and family life. Reports on his activities have also highlighted his concern for animals, birds, trees, and the environment.

== Environmental activities ==
Alongside his religious, educational, and media activities, Shahab Moradi has been involved in environmental initiatives, wildlife protection, tree planting, and the promotion of social responsibility. A significant part of these activities has been based on the connection between kindness, civic participation, and nature conservation, pursued through cultural and media programs and voluntary activities.

=== Kindness toward birds and engagement with artists ===
Even before assuming leadership of the Cultural and Artistic Organization of Tehran Municipality, Moradi had spoken on social media about the declining presence of birds in cities and the need for residents to pay attention to their access to water, food, and suitable habitats.

He encouraged his audience to provide water and seeds for birds and to make suitable nesting places available. These activities attracted interest among social media users, and the hashtag "مهربونی با پرندگان" ("Kindness to Birds") gained popularity.

Moradi also drew upon the participation of artists and television productions to promote such practices. At a ceremony honoring the cast and crew of the third season of Capital (Paytakht 3), packages containing birdhouses, water containers, and birdseed were presented to the artists. Siroos Moghaddam, the director of the series, subsequently included scenes depicting the feeding of birds in his next television series, Madineh.

=== The "Tehran's Bulbul" initiative and the "Tehran Has Birds" program ===
In October 2014, during Moradi's presidency of the Cultural and Artistic Organization of Tehran Municipality, the "Tehran Has Birds" program was held to promote kindness toward birds.

The program, also known as "Tehran's Bulbul", included the release of caged white-eared bulbuls, the construction and installation of birdhouses, the distribution of birdseed, and cultural and educational activities for children and families.

The program was held at several cultural centers in Tehran, with the participation of residents, families, children, and cultural figures. The Cultural and Artistic Organization of Tehran Municipality stated that its aim was to continue these activities and encourage residents to make caring for birds part of their everyday lives.

Alongside the publicly organized program, Moradi also undertook a personal and voluntary bird-release initiative at his own expense. In a 2015 interview with Haft-e Sobh, he stated that, following his own studies of the subject, he had purchased and released a number of wild white-eared bulbuls (Pycnonotus leucotis), known in Persian as bolbol-e khorma (بلبل خرما). According to Moradi, these birds had been captured by trappers in farms and date-palm groves in southern Iran and brought to Tehran for sale. He further stated that the released birds had adapted to the urban environment and that their songs could be heard, particularly before sunrise.

==== Expert analysis and reception ====
Esmail Kahram, an Iranian ornithologist and adviser to the Department of Environment, praised Shahab Moradi's thinking and benevolent intentions behind the bird-release initiative. He emphasized the initiative's educational value in teaching children kindness toward birds and nature, while stressing the importance of scientific guidance and consideration for the birds' welfare.

=== The "No Hunting" campaign ===
In October 2014, Moradi appeared on the television program Khandevane, where, in a conversation with Rambod Javan, he proposed that the Islamic Consultative Assembly pass legislation prohibiting the hunting of animals and birds for seven years, until 2021.

The proposal received media attention and was promoted on social media under the title "No Hunting". Moradi encouraged his audience to support the initiative. Text messages and public participation on social media were also part of the related activities.

Following the proposal, Iran's Department of Environment introduced restrictions on the issuance of hunting permits during the same period, some of which continued in subsequent years.

=== Tree planting, green space development, and voluntary participation ===
According to published reports, Shahab Moradi has undertaken voluntary programs promoting tree planting and the development of green spaces across Iran since the early 2000s. During the 2010s, these programs continued under his planning and leadership, with the participation of members of his "Classes for Singles" and other followers. Examples include tree-planting activities in the Telo hills between 2016 and 2018, the planting of 10,000 trees in the Latman Kun area in 2020, and an event at Chitgar Forest Park in 2021, which was held in compliance with health regulations during the COVID-19 pandemic. Reports of these events also referred to cooperation with organizations responsible for natural resources.

In media interviews, Moradi has emphasized the importance of teaching children about tree planting, involving different social groups, choosing species suited to local climates, and caring for trees.

=== Water conservation, watershed management, and water dispatching ===
In media interviews, Shahab Moradi has discussed water conservation, watershed management, and the management of surface runoff. In 2015, he emphasized the importance of rainwater infiltration into the soil and avoiding excessive coverage of the ground with impermeable materials. In 2021, he also highlighted the need for watershed management, the maintenance and dredging of reservoirs, and better use of runoff.

In an interview with Tabnak in September 2026, Moradi emphasized the responsibility of public officials to prevent flood damage and store water. He described measures such as aquifer management, groundwater recharge, and the management of runoff as necessary. He also proposed the idea of "water dispatching": a national, intelligent network, similar to the electricity dispatching system, intended to monitor water resources and capacities in an integrated manner and coordinate water storage and allocation while observing environmental requirements.

== Works ==
- Khoob Ast Bedanid (خوب است بدانید; "It is Good to Know")
- In Roozha (این روزها; "These Days")
