= Saman Ghanbarizadeh =

Iranian Freestyle Stunt Rider

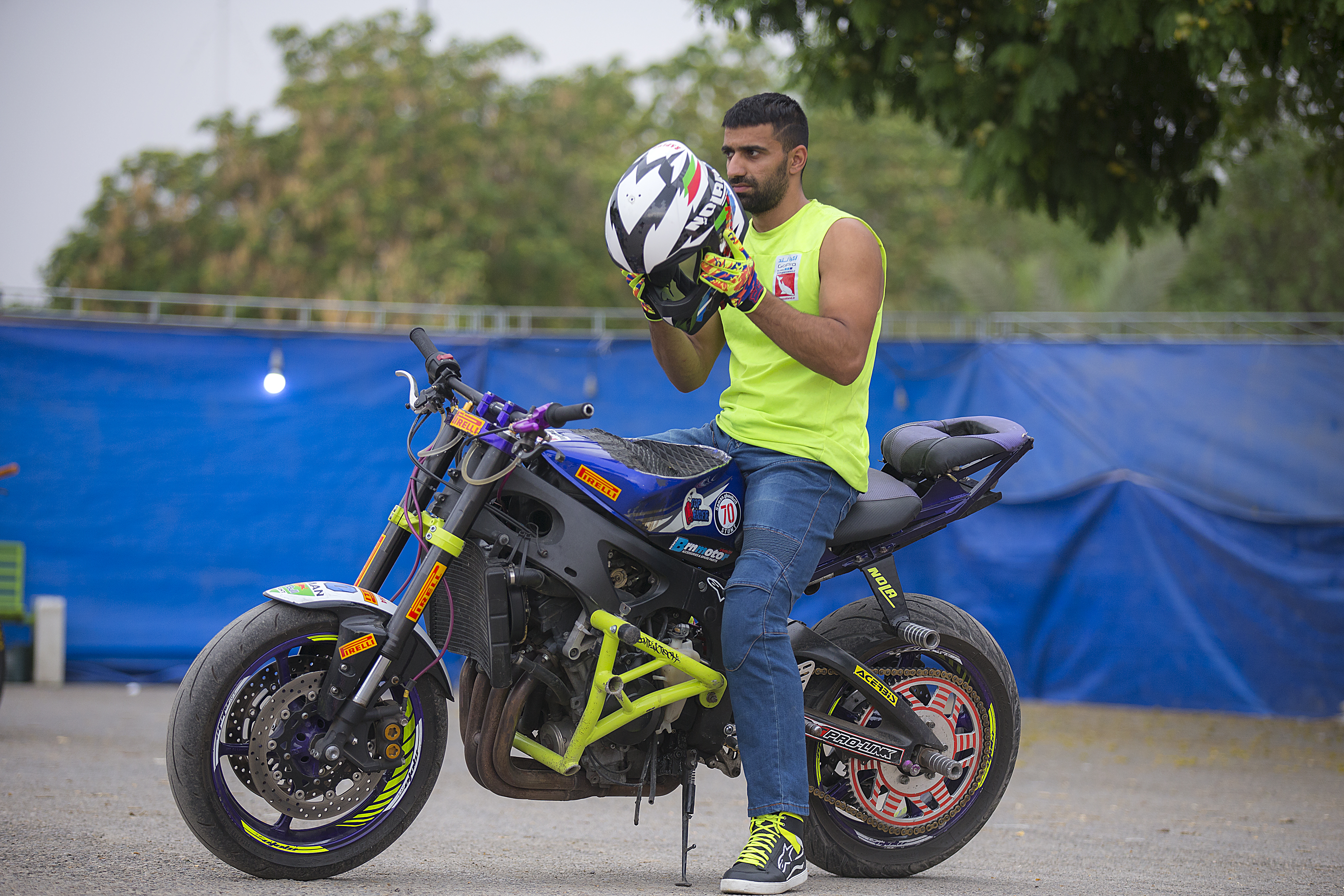

Personal information
- Nickname: Saman Ghanbari
- Nationality: Iranian
- Born: September 21, 1991 (age 34) Dezful, Iran
- Occupation(s): Stunt rider, Motorcyclist
- Height: 174 cm (5 ft 9 in)
- Weight: 74 kg (163 lb)

Sport
- Sport: Motorcycle stunt riding

Achievements and titles
- Highest world ranking: 9th at 2018 Stunt Master Cup in Dubai

Saman Ghanbarizadeh (Persian: سامان قنبری‌زاده, born 21 September 1991 in Dezful, Iran), also known as Saman Ghanbari, is an Iranian motorcyclist, motorcycle racer and trainer in the field of stunt riding.

Ghanbarizadeh is the first Iranian motorcyclist in the style of dramatic movements and one of the phenomena of Iranian motorcycling in recent years.

== Life ==
Saman Ghanbari began his sports career as a child. Saman worked first in soccer and then in bodybuilding and achieved some success at county and provincial level. Motorbike was one of his favorite interests from a young age and he started working seriously in this field as a teenager. At first, he was involved in cross-country motoring, and then acquaintance with the motorcycling field led him to become the first Iranian motorcyclist in the field. Many years of work and practice in this field has enabled him to win the Asian and World Championships. He won second place in the first year of Asian competitions. in 2018 won first place in Asian competition. He was also placed ninth in the world among thirty participants.

In 2019, Saman participated in the Asre Jadid television talent show and performed in it.

== Professional career ==
=== Stunt Masters Cup ===
- 2016: 2nd place, Dubai, UAE
- 2017: 2nd place in Asia, 9th place in the world, Dubai, UAE
- 2018: 1st place in the Asia, 9th place in the world, Ras Al Khaimah, UAE
- 2018: 10th place at World Championship, Dubai, UAE
- 2022: 5th place at world Championship, Czech
