= Roya Nonahali =

Iranian actress and director (born 1963)

- رویا نونهالی
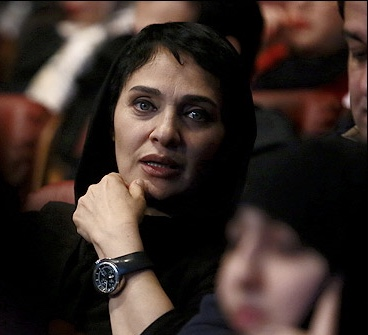
- Nonahali in February 2014
- Born: February 13, 1963 (age 63); Tehran, Iran
- Occupations: Actress, Director
- Years active: 1986–present
- Spouse: Ramin Heydari Faroughi
- Children: 1

Roya Nonahali (Persian: رویا نونهالی; born February 13, 1963) is an Iranian actress and director. She studied painting, and has worked in theatre since 1984. Nonahali started film acting with The Beloved Is at Home (1987, by Khosrow Sinai). Then she was selected by Mohsen Makhmalbaf for Marriage of the Blessed and received a Crystal Simorgh for Best Actress from Fajr International Film Festival. Her performance in Smell of Camphor, Fragrance of Jasmine was awarded with the Best Supporting Actress award at the festival. She started acting in TV programs by Asleep & Awake in 2001. In 2019 she referee's in first Iranian Talent Show called Asre Jadid produced by Ehsan Alikhani.

== Filmography ==
- The Imperfect Man, 1992
- The Fifth Season, 1996
- Smell of Camphor, Scent of Jasmine (directed by Bahman Farmanara), 2000
- Sleep and Awake (TV series), 2002-2003
- Women's Prison, 2002
- The House Built on Water, 2002
- A Piece of Bread (Yek Tekke Nan, directed by Kamal Tabrizi), 2005
- Niloofar, (directed by Sabine El Gemayel), 2008
- It Happened at Midnight, 2016
- Shirin, 2008
- Helen, 2017
- Shahrzad, 2017
- The Waltz of Grey Years, 2020
- Queen of Beggars (TV series), 2021

== TV Show ==
- Asre Jadid (season 1) 2019
- Asre Jadid 2020–present
