= Whisper My Name (film) =

- زیبا صدایم کن
- Directed by: Rasoul Sadrameli
- Screenplay by: Arash Sadeghbeigi; Milad Sadrameli; Mohammadreza Sadrameli
- Based on: Ziba Sedayam Kon by Farhad Hassanzadeh
- Produced by: Seyed Maziar Hashemi
- Starring: Amin Hayai; Jouliette Rezai; Setareh Pesyani; Mehran Ghafoorian
- Cinematography: Saman Lotfian
- Edited by: Bahram Dehghani
- Music by: Christophe Rezai
- Production companies: Kanoon Institute for the Intellectual Development of Children and Young Adults; Farabi Cinema Foundation; HIB Film; Milad Film
- Distributed by: Filmiran (theatrical); FilmNet (online)
- Release dates: 4 February 2025 (Fajr International Film Festival); 7 May 2025 (Iran)
- Running time: 108 minutes
- Country: Iran
- Language: Persian
- Box office: 834,556,315,000 tomans

Whisper My Name (Persian: زیبا صدایم کن, romanized: Zibā Sedāyam Kon) is a 2025 Iranian drama film directed by Rasoul Sadrameli, produced by Seyed Maziar Hashemi, and written by Arash Sadeghbeigi, Milad Sadrameli, and Mohammadreza Sadrameli. It is based on the novel Ziba Sedayam Kon by Farhad Hassanzadeh. The film stars Amin Hayai, Jouliette Rezai, Setareh Pesyani, and Mehran Ghafoorian.

The film premiered in the Crystal Simorgh Competition at the 43rd Fajr International Film Festival, where it won the Crystal Simorgh for Best Film. It was also selected as the Best Film by the critics and writers of the Iranian magazine Film.

== Plot ==
Based on the novel Ziba Sedayam Kon by Farhad Hassanzadeh, the film follows Khosrow, a man who has been involuntarily confined to a psychiatric hospital for years. Throughout his confinement, he has never stopped thinking about his daughter, Ziba. On the day of her sixteenth birthday, Khosrow refuses to let the occasion pass without seeing her, setting out on a journey to reunite with his daughter.

== Cast ==
- Amin Hayai as Khosrow
- Jouliette Rezai as Ziba
- Mehran Ghafoorian as Khalil
- Setareh Pesyani as the head nurse
- Zeinab Shabani as the school principal
- Hasan Mirbagheri as the judge
- Ava Razzazan

== Awards and nominations ==
Year	Award	Category	Recipient(s)	Result	Ref.
2025	43rd Fajr International Film Festival	Best Film	Seyed Maziar Hashemi	Won	
2025	43rd Fajr International Film Festival	Best Director	Rasoul Sadrameli	Nominated	
2025	43rd Fajr International Film Festival	Best Actor	Amin Hayai	Nominated	
2025	43rd Fajr International Film Festival	Best Actress	Jouliette Rezai	Nominated	
2025	43rd Fajr International Film Festival	Best Screenplay	Arash Sadeghbeigi; Milad Sadrameli; Mohammadreza Sadrameli	Nominated	
2025	43rd Fajr International Film Festival	Best Cinematography	Saman Lotfian	Nominated	
2025	43rd Fajr International Film Festival	Best Editing	Bahram Dehghani	Nominated	
2025	43rd Fajr International Film Festival	Best Makeup	Azim Farayen	Nominated	
2025	43rd Fajr International Film Festival	Best Special Effects	Arash Aghabik	Nominated	
2025	43rd Fajr International Film Festival	Best Visual Effects	Farid Nazerfasihi; Farhad Zamani	Nominated	
2025	43rd Fajr International Film Festival	Audience Award	Seyed Maziar Hashemi	Nominated	
2025	24th Hafez Awards	Best Film	Seyed Maziar Hashemi	Nominated	
2025	24th Hafez Awards	Best Director	Rasoul Sadrameli	Nominated	
2025	24th Hafez Awards	Best Screenplay	Arash Sadeghbeigi; Milad Sadrameli; Mohammadreza Sadrameli	Nominated	
2025	24th Hafez Awards	Best Actor	Amin Hayai	Nominated	
2025	24th Hafez Awards	Best Actress	Jouliette Rezai	Nominated	
2025	24th Hafez Awards	Best Original Score	Christophe Rezai	Nominated	
2025	24th Hafez Awards	Best Cinematography	Saman Lotfian	Nominated	
2025	24th Hafez Awards	Best Editing	Bahram Dehghani	Nominated	
2025	24th Hafez Awards	Special Jury Award	Rasoul Sadrameli	Won	
2025	24th Hafez Awards	Special Achievement Award	Amin Hayai	Won	
