= Helen (2017 film) =

- Film poster
- Persian: هلن
- Directed by: Ali Akbar Saghafi
- Written by: Amir Hossein Saghafi; Sharareh Soroush
- Produced by: Ali Akbar Saghafi
- Starring: Roshanak Gerami; Roya Nonahali; Pejman Bazeghi; Amin Hayai; Hootan Shakiba; Setareh Pesyani
- Cinematography: Farshad Golsefidi
- Edited by: Mastaneh Mohajer
- Music by: Arya Aziminejad
- Distributed by: Nimrooz Film
- Release date: 22 February 2017
- Running time: 90 minutes
- Country: Iran
- Language: Persian

Helen (Persian: هلن) is a 2017 Iranian drama film directed and produced by Ali Akbar Saghafi.

== Plot ==
Helen is the story of a girl who wants to go Italy but takes a different path due to family problems...

== Cast ==
- Roshanak Gerami as Helen
- Roya Nonahali as Nasrin (Mother of Helen)
- Pejman Bazeghi as Bobby
- Amin Hayai as Step-Father of Helen
- Hootan Shakiba as Ashkan
- Setareh Pesyani as Negin
- Sahar Khazaeli as Shabnam
- Mehrdad Fallahatgar
- Sara Kashefi
- Ashkan Mehri
- Faranak Kooshafar
