= Rahaei =

Rahei
- Directed by: Rasul Sadremali
- Written by: Rasul Sadremali
- Release date: 1982
- Country: Iran

Rahaei (Persian: رهایی, meaning Deliverance or Liberation in English) is an Iranian film by the director Rasul Sadremali. Sadremali also co-wrote the script. The film is set during the Iran-Iraq war, and is an early example of Sacred Defence cinema. It was released in 1982/83.
