= Erfan Tahmasbi =

Erfan Tahmasbi عرفان طهماسبی
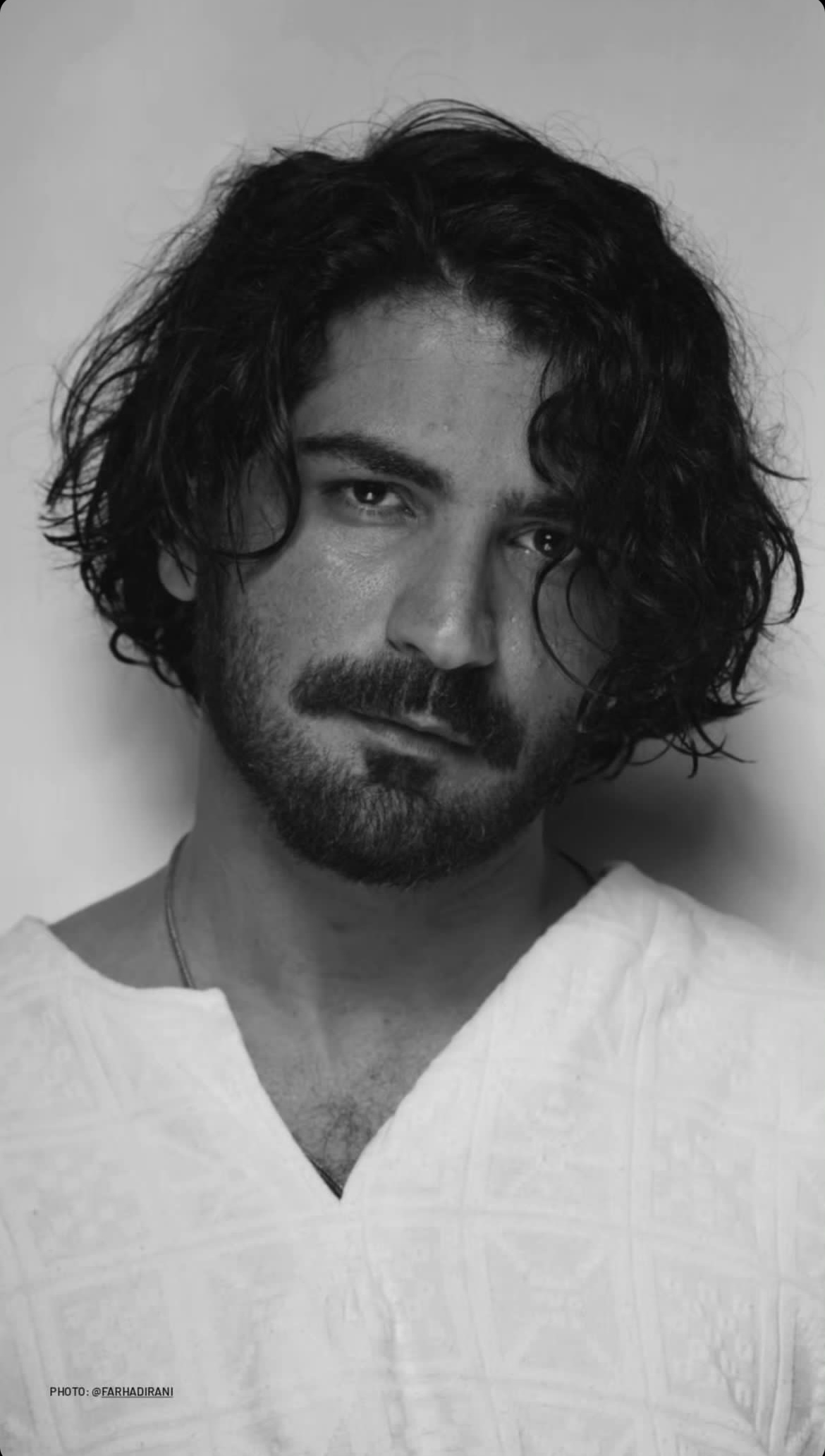
- Tahmasbi in July 2024.

Background information
- Born: 17 September 1997 (age 29); Shushtar, Khuzestan, Iran
- Genres: Pop; Dance; Disco; Bandari
- Occupations: Songwriter, singer and composer
- Instruments: Vocals; Guitar
- Years active: 2020-present
- Publishers: Avaye Honar (Cultural and Artistic Institute); Persian Music Group

Erfan Tahmasbi (born September 16, 1997, Shushtar, Khuzestan) is an Iranian (Bakhtiari-Lur) songwriter, singer, and composer based in Ahvaz. He was first publicly seen on Asr Jadid, where he sang his self-written and composed song, "Mah Mo" (Southern Luri: ماه مو, lit. 'My Moon') and held his first concert in 2024 in Tehran.

== Personal life ==
Erfan Tahmasbi was born on September 17, 1997, in Shushtar, Khuzestan, Iran.

== Career ==
Because his older brother sang and played musical instruments, Erfan also became interested in music from a young age, but he never had an academic education in the field of music.

In an interview with Deutsche Welle, Tahmasbi said that as a teenager he began acting under his teacher Majid Behdari and after a few years became interested in reciting the Shahnameh. In 2016, Tahmasbi invented and performed a new style of reciting the Shahnameh; reciting Ferdowsi's poems in the tone of pop music while simultaneously explaining the story (narrative), which led Zia al-Din Hajari Mohaqiq, a writer and head of the Persian Language Refinement Association, to use the term "Khaniya Hengameh Khan" to address him for the first time. He believed that "Erfan is both a singer and a Hengameh reciter".

In 2020, he appeared on the second season of Asr Jadid, where his performance of the song "Golom Golom" (Southern Luri: گُلُم گُلُم, lit. 'my rose, my rose') went viral in Iranian media. The special attention paid by prominent Iranian music critic Hooman Khalatbari to his performance caused the music community to pay more attention to his works.

After Tahmasbi won the runner-up title in the program, he began his artistic career with the "Avaye Honar" cultural and artistic publishing company.

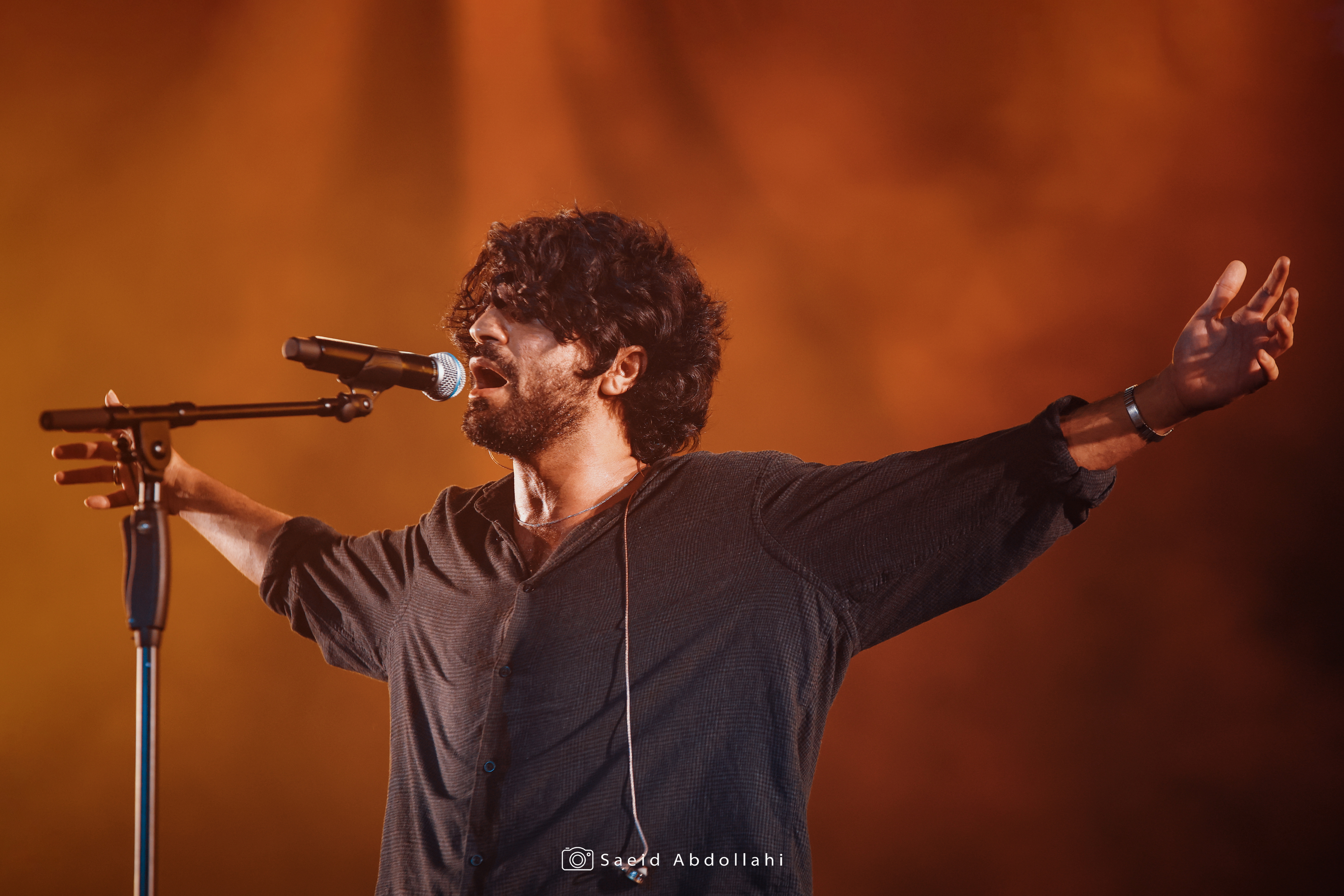
Erfan Tahmasbi during his first Season of Concerts in Tehran

Tahmasbi held his first concert in June 2024 at the Spinas Plus in Tehran, which was well-received and received by critics.
