= Mah-e Asal (TV series) =

Iranian reality TV series, 2007-2018

- Created by: Ehsan Alikhani
- Opening theme: Introduction
- Country of origin: Iran
- Original language: Persian
- No. of seasons: 12
- No. of episodes: 355

Production
- Camera setup: Multi-camera
- Running time: Daily during Ramadan

Original release
- Network: IRIB TV3
- Release: September 13, 2007 – June 15, 2018

Mah-e Asal (Persian: ماه عسل, meaning "honeymoon") was an Iranian, Persian language, popular daily television program broadcast by Channel 3 during Ramadan. The host of the program was Ehsan Alikhani. The main subject of the program was the life of ordinary people who have had an extraordinary rare experience.

The program aired daily from 2007 to 2018 during Ramadan, often collaborating with Iran's judicial system, which is based on Islamic law and includes the "eye for an eye" principle. It finished broadcasting and production after 12 years in 2018.

The storyline of the 2019 film Yalda, a Night for Forgiveness, directed by Massoud Bakhshi, is based on the show, but transposes it to Yaldā Night instead of Ramadan. In the film, a young woman convicted of murder pleads for forgiveness from the daughter of the victim, while the audience can sms their votes to help pay for the blood money.

== Notable guests ==
- Yassi Ashki
- Narges Kalbasi
- Parastoo Salehi
