= Yassi Ashki =

Iranian activist

- یاسی اشکی
- Born: Yasaman Ashki; 1981 (age 44–45); Tehran/Iran
- Occupations: Health activist Co-Founder & CEO of RAH Foundation
- Spouse: Massih Bahar
- Website: https://www.ctrlstd.com/

Yasaman Ashki better known as Yassi Ashki is an Iranian health activist and the founder of RAH Foundation and Ctrl+S website.

== Life ==
Ashki moved from Tehran, Iran to the United States in 2011 to attend Indiana University. After reading several pamphlets about STDs, she realized she'd never been taught about any of them. Several years later, she and her Iranian friend Narges Dorratoltaj decided to start a website about sexual health for Persian speakers. The website Ctrl-S was launched on Ctrlstd.com in 2014, and featured translations of about 800 articles about sexual health from the Mayo Clinic, Centers for Disease Control and Prevention, and Planned Parenthood. The team has expanded to over 50 people and the two founders now run a nongovernmental organization; registered in the United States as RAH Foundation and registered in Iran as Ctrl+S. They negotiated with the Ministry of Health and Medical Education in Iran, and gained permission to run workshops about sexual health in Iranian mosques and schools. They also train volunteers to educate rural communities. In 2015, they launched Hide and Seek under the RAH Foundation. It is an organization that focuses on raising awareness and education about the sexual abuse of children.

== Mah-e Asal ==
Ashki was the guest of Mah-e Asal (a popular live television program in Iran) on 29 May 2018 and spoke about her life and experiences. Ashki spoke about the need for HPV vaccines in Iran and claimed she was diagnosed with HPV, an autoimmune disorder with symptoms that are sometimes similar to AIDS in that her immune system was compromised. Watching the interview, Rakhshān Banietemad announced her support for Ashki. Ashkit's contradicted comments were doubted and criticized by people and several sources as containing false or misleading information.
