= Farhad Hasanzadeh =

Iranian author and poet (born 1962)

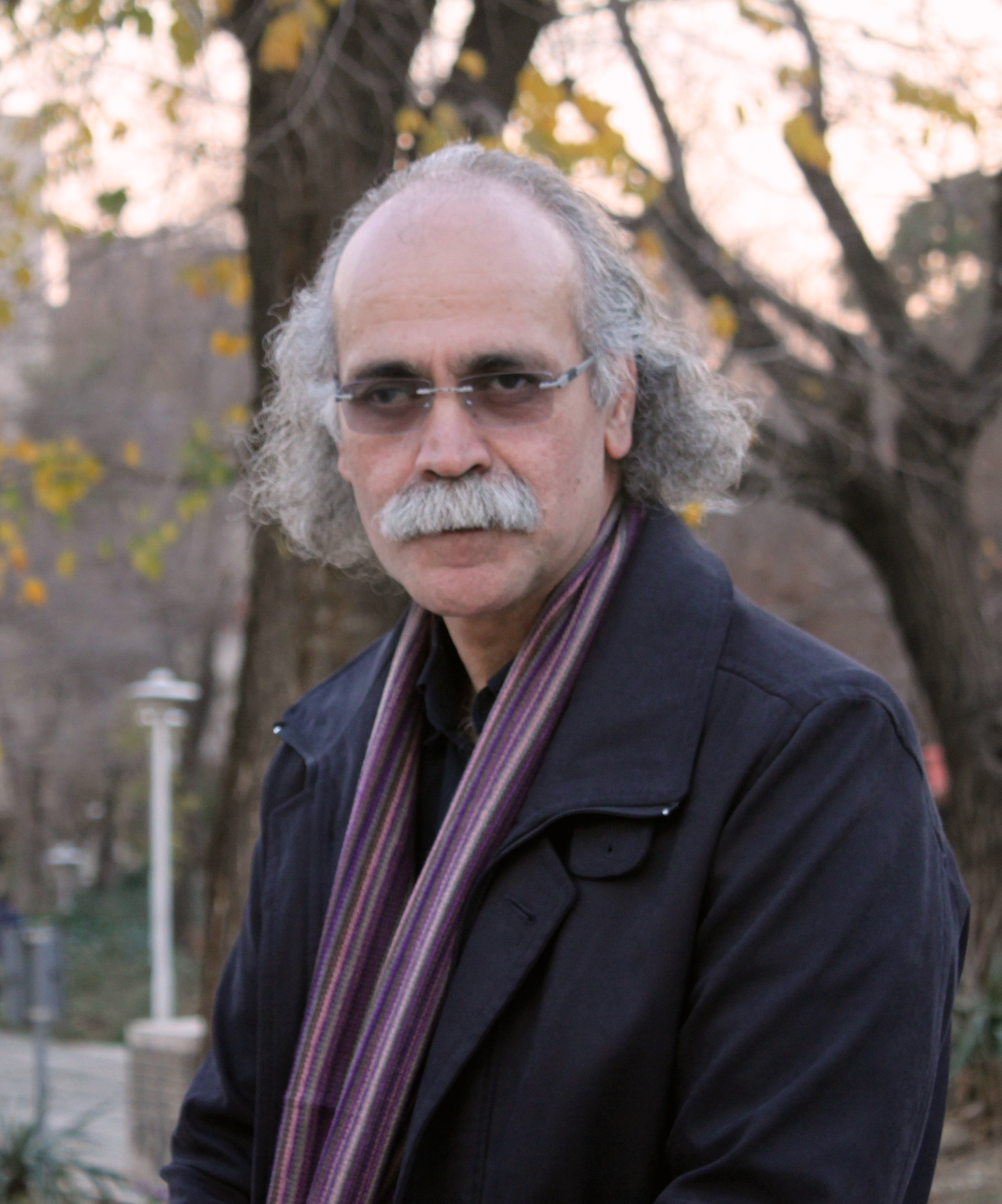
- Born: 9 April 1962 (age 64); Abadan, Khuzestan Province, Iran
- Occupations: Writer, Poet, Journalist
- Writing career
- Language: Persian
- Genres: Children's and young adults literature
- Notable works: Hasti (2010); This Weblog Is Being Transferred (2012); Call Me Ziba (2015)
- Website: Farhad Hasanzadeh Centre

Farhad Hasanzadeh (Persian: فرهاد حسن‌زاده); (born 1962) is an Iranian author of children's, young adult and adult fiction. He has published more than 130 books, including Hasti, Call Me Ziba, and This Weblog Is Being Turned Over, several of which have been translated into multiple languages. He has been nominated multiple times for the Astrid Lindgren Memorial Award and was shortlisted for the Hans Christian Andersen Award. His novel Call Me Ziba was later adapted into a feature film.

== Biography ==
Hasanzadeh was born in Abadan, southern Iran, in 1962. The Iran–Iraq War (1980–1988) forced him and his family to leave their hometown and settle in Shiraz. Before becoming a full-time writer, he worked in a variety of occupations. His first book was published in Shiraz in 1991. In 1993, he moved to Tehran, where he continued his literary career. Experiences of war, displacement, and life in southern Iran later became recurring themes in many of his works.

== Writing career ==
Hasanzadeh has published more than 130 books for children and young adults, including novels, short stories, legends, fantasy, humour, biography and poetry. He has also contributed to children's and young adults’ press, including "Soroosh Nojavan", "Soroosh Koodak", "Aftabgardan", "Keihan Bacheha". He has been a member of Children Writers Association and a member of the directing board. He had been working for Docharkheh, one of the most-circulated children magazines in Iran while it had been published, accompanying the Hamshahri newspaper. He also delivered a speech at the United Nations office in Tehran on the topic of peace and literature for children and adolescents in 2019.

=== Translated works ===
Translations of many of his works are available in many languages, including English, Swedish, Spanish, Arabic, Russian, Malay and Chinese. Call Me Ziba has been translated into four languages, while Kooti Kooti translated into Chinese, English, Arabic, Turkish, Swedish and Malay languages. This Weblog is being Turned Over found its audiences within anglophone. Hasti which raised flag about Iranian female Identity, was translated into English in 2013 and into Turkish in 2017.

=== Teaching ===
Hasanzadeh’s online writing workshops are designed to help teens develop their writing skills and practice the craft of storytelling. The workshops culminate in a monthly virtual publication called Moon Children, where participants can showcase their work and share it with an audience. The publication features short stories, poems, articles, reviews, and other creative pieces created by Hasanzadeh’s pupils.

=== Themes ===
The Routledge Companion to International Children's Literature describes his work as "inclined towards a classic style" as opposed to postmodern. His writing often deals with the subject of war, and particularly its effect on civilians; it takes a pacifist, humanist stance. Other topics include migration, homelessness and life in shanty towns. His characters are sometimes marginalised, and he often addresses social taboos such as rape and sexual abuse, subjects rarely covered in other Persian novels. The Routledge Companion contrasts the feminist stance in his novel Hasti with typical Iranian children's literature.

== Awards ==
He has won many book awards, including several Iran's Book of the Year Awards. He was the Iranian nomination for the Astrid Lindgren Memorial Award in 2017, 2018, 2019, 2020 and 2023. Hasanzadeh was a runner-up in the Hans Christian Andersen Award in 2018 and 2020 and finally received the diploma in the award ceremony in Athens, Greece. His novel Hasti has won several awards: winner in the Festival that teens judged, the Silver Sign award of the Flying Turtle Festival and the best book of the year on behalf of Children's Book Council. Hasanzadeh was among the top 6 writers selected for Hans Christian Andersen Award and brought its appreciation plate back to his home country of Iran. In June 2022, he was nominated to receive the 2023 Astrid Lindgern Memorial Award, partly due to paying attention to the issues of society, such as girls and modern femininity in today's world, addressing universal human values such as peace, friendship and children's rights, looking at war from different aspects and also the environment.

== Selected works ==
- ''Masho in Fog'', Tehran: Nashr-e Soureh-ye Mehr, 1373/1994 (Persian: ماشو در مه)
- ''The Same Purple Shoe'', Tehran: Kanoon Publication, 1382/2003 (Persian: همان لنگه کفش بنفش)
- ''The Backyard'', Tehran: Entesharat-e Ghoghnous, 1382/2003 (Persian: حیاط خلوت)
- ''A Happy Family's Grins'', Tehran: Entesharat-e Charkh-o Falak, 1382/2003 (Persian: لبخندهای کشمشی یک خانواده‌ی خوشبخت)
- ''Wishing Stones'', illustrated by Hoda Hadadi, Tehran: Entesharat-e Elmi Farhangi, 1385/2006 (Persian: سنگ‌های آرزو)
- ''The Moonlight Guest'', Tehran: Nashr-e Ofoq, 1387/2008 (Persian: مهمان مهتاب)
- ''Hasti'', Tehran: Kanoon Publication, 1389/2010 (Persian: هستی)
- ''The Pot-headed Monster'', e-book, Kanoon Publication, 1389/2010 (Persian: دیو دیگ به سر)
- ''My Blog Is Up For Grabs'', Tehran: Nashr-e Ofoq, 1391/2012 (Persian: این وبلاگ واگذار می‌شود)
- ''Shirin’s Times'', Tehran: Vida Publication, 1392/2013 (Persian: روزگار شیرین)
- ''Kooti Kooti Tales'', in Braille, Kanoon Publication, 1392/2013 (Persian: قصه‌های کوتی کوتی)
- ''Call Me Ziba'', Tehran: Kanoon-e Parvaresh-e Fekri-ye Kudakan va Nowjavanan (Kanoon), 1394/2015 (Persian: زیبا صدایم کن)
- ''The Scorpions on the Bambek Ship'', Tehran: Nashr-e Ofoq, 1395/2016 (Persian: عقرب‌های کشتی بمبک)
- ''An Umbrella with White Butterflies'', Tehran: Fatemi Publications, Tuti Books, 1396/2017 (Persian: چتری با پروانه‌های سفید)
- ''Will & Nill'', Chekkeh Publications, 1396/2017 (Persian: بشو و نشو)
- ''A Melody for Wednesdays'', Tehran: Peydayesh Publication, 1398/2019 (Persian: آهنگی برای چهارشنبه‌ها)
- ''Snow and Sun: The Story of Bijan & Manijeh'', Tehran: Fatemi Publications, Tuti Books, 1398/2019 (Persian: برف و آفتاب: داستان بیژن و منیژه)
- ''Bang, Bang, Bang'', Illustrated Children's Story Book, Cheshmeh Publications, 1400/2021 (Persian: بنگ، بنگ، بنگ)
- ''Not Like Every Day'', Tehran: Cheshmeh Publications, 1400/2022 (Persian: نه مثل هر روز)
- ''First Things First'', Illustrated Children's Story Book, Fatemi Publications, 1401/2022 (Persian: یک کار خیلی مهم)
- ''Mahtab and Red Button'', Tehran: Michka Publications, 1401/2022 (Persian: مهتاب و دکمه قرمز)
- ''Give Heart, Give Heart'', Tehran: Michka Publications, 1401/2022 (Persian: دل بده، دل بده)
- ''Jack London's Train'', Tehran: Ofoq Publications, 1401/2022 (Persian: قطار جک لندن)
- ''DODO the Worm and His New Home'', Tehran: Porteghal Publications, 1402/2023 (Persian: دودو کرمه و خانه تازه)
- ''Banafsheh's Green Pen'', Tehran: Michka Publications, 1402/2024 (Persian: خودکار سبز بنفشه)
- “The Suitcase Mix-Up” Tehran, Ketabkhorha Publishing, 1405/2026 (Persian: اشتباه چمدانی)

== Some translated works (Published & Publishing) ==
  - ''The Kooti Kooti Tales'' (2010) – English translation, Tehran: Kanoon (2010)
  - ''The Pot-headed Monster'' (2010) – Kurdish translation, Kanoon (2010)
  - ''Kooti Kooti'' (2010) – Malay translation, Malaysia: Ameeneducar (2011)
  - ''Hasti'' (2010) – English translation, Tehran: Kanoon (2013)
  - ''Halva and Rainbow'' (2012) – Russian translation, Sadra Book (2022)
  - ''This Weblog Is Being Turned Over'' (2012) – English translation, Internet Archive (United States) (2020)
  - ''Kooti Kooti Watch Out You Don’t Catch a Cold'' (2014) – English translation, Tehran: Kanoon (2016); Turkish translation, Mevsimler Kitap (2020)
  - ''Move the World Kooti Kooti'' (2014) – English translation, Tehran: Kanoon (2016); Turkish translation, Mevsimler Kitap (2020)
  - ''Call Me Ziba'' (2015) – English translation, Tehran: Kanoon (2016); Turkish translation, Timaş Yayınları (2017); Armenian translation, Edit Print Publishing House (2019); Arabic translation, Egyptian Cultural Assembly (2020)
  - ''Will and Nill'' (2015) – English translation, London: Tiny Owl Publishing Ltd (2016)
  - ''An Umbrella with White Butterflies'' (2017) – Korean translation, South Korea (2020); Spanish translation, Spain: La Maleta Ediciones (2020); Turkish translation, Republic of Azerbaijan: Tahsil Publications (2022); Chinese translation, China: CCPPG Publishing House (2022); Japanese translation (2025)
  - ''The Absent-Minded Mouse'' (2019) – English translation, Kanoon (2023)
  - ''Bang, Bang, Bang!'' (2021) – Turkish translation, Republic of Azerbaijan: Tahsil Publications (2022)
  - ''Don’t Be Sad Zebra'' – Published in Turkish, Republic of Azerbaijan: Tahsil Publications (2022)
  - ''Grandfathers Who Eat Junk'' (2022) – English translation, Kidsocado (2024)
  - ''The Creamy Laugh'' – Published in English and German , Daarvak (2024) ----
