= Mohammad Reza Shahidifard =

Mohammad Reza Shahidifard (born 14 January 1969 in Mashhad) is an Iranian presenter, producer, and director. He is also a member of the Expert Committee for Presenters and Broadcasters of the IRIB. He began his television career in 1991 with the program called "Until Eight and a Half." "Hello, People of Iran" and "Mellat Park" were among his other television programs, which he produced, directed, and performed live.

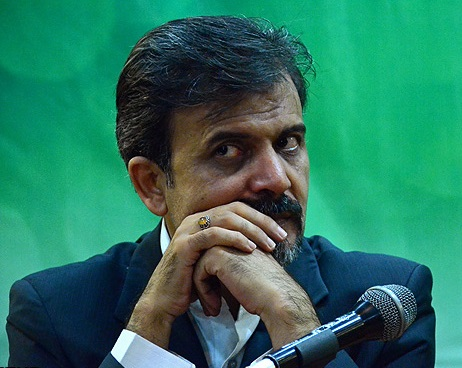
Mohammadreza Shahidifar at the Khandevane program review meeting, September 2014
