= New Era (TV series) =

Televised Iranian talent show competition

- Genre: Reality; Talent contest
- Created by: Ehsan Alikhani
- Directed by: Ehsan Alikhani
- Presented by: Ehsan Alikhani
- Judges: Season 1 and 2: Amin Hayai; Roya Nonahali; Bashir Hosseyni; Arya Azimi-nezhad; Season 3: Amin Hayai; Zhaleh Sameti; Karen Homayounfar; Majid Esmaeili
- Country of origin: Iran
- Original language: Persian
- No. of seasons: 3

Production
- Producer: Ehsan Alikhani
- Running time: 60–130 minutes
- Production company: IRIB

Original release
- Network: IRIB TV3
- Release: 16 February 2019 – present

New Era (Persian: عصر جدید, "Asre Jadid") is an Iranian talent television competition. The program was produced by Ehsan Alikhani and launched on IRIB TV3 on 16 February 2019. The second season of the program began on 25 February 2020. And the third season of this contest started on 21 March 2022 and it was aired at the same time as Nowruz. New Era is one of the most popular programs in IRIB.

Participants can participate in the arts, sports and entertainments. New Era program attracts a variety of talents from all over Iran to somehow showcase their talent to the public. In this program, participants can individually or in groups in various fields of art, science, sports and entertainment, including singing, magic, acrobatics, comedy, mind reading, math, beatboxing, gymnastics, dubbing and dubbing, martial arts, drama, parkour, Rhythmic movements and… participate. This program attracts different abilities from all over Iran. [3] Each participant tries to impress the present judges by showing his talent live and get a white or yes vote from them. The judges of the program in the first and second seasons were Amin Hayaei, Seyed Bashir Hosseini, Arya Azimi-Nejad and Roya Nonhali. The program is prepared and performed by Ehsan Alikhani, and in the third season, Amin Hayaee, along with Majid Ismaili, Karen Homayounfar, and Jaleh Sameti, are the judges of the third season of "Asr Jadid". As in previous seasons, Ehsan Alikhani is in charge of preparing and executing the program. - those who draw their talents and people's votes to the finals and win prizes to compete with other talents.

== Awards ==
Year	awards	Grouping	Result	Ref
2019	Tvpluss	The best and most popular special Nowruz TV program in 1398 and 1399	Won	
2018	IRIB	The most watched special Nowruz TV program	Won	
2018	IRIB	The best TV show from the people's point of view	Won	

== Judges and hosts ==
Season	Host	Backstage host	Judges			
	1	1	1	2	3	4
1	Ehsan Alikhani	Iman Ghiasi	Amin Hayai	Bashir Hosseini	Arya Aziminejad	Roya Nonahali
2	Ehsan Alikhani	Iman Ghiasi	Amin Hayai	Bashir Hosseini	Arya Aziminejad	Roya Nonahali
3	Ehsan Alikhani	Iman Ghiasi	Amin Hayai	Majid Esmaeili	Karen Homayounfar	Zhaleh Sameti

The first season of New Era program featured four judges. The judges are Amin Hayai, Bashir Hosseini, Arya Aziminejad and Roya Nonahali. Ehsan Alikhani is also host of the program. The second season of the New Era, as with the first season, was judged by Amin Hayai, Bashir Hosseini, Arya Aziminejad and Roya Nonahali but its third season hold by new judges Zhaleh Sameti, Karen Homayounfar, Majid Esmaeili and also Amin Hayai who was presented in previous seasons.

== Season synopses ==
Season	First Aired	Last Aired	Winner	Runner-up	Third place
1	16 February 2019	22 August 2019	Fatemeh Ebadi	Mohammad Zare	Parsa Khaef
2	25 February 2020	19 March 2021	Fereshtegan-e Ninja Group (Iran Nija Girls)	Erfan Tahmasebi	Javanmardan-e Iranzamin Group
3	21 March 2022	18 July 2022	Ali tolabe	Pahlvank haye iran	Peyman ebadi
