= Narges Ashtari =

British-Iranian aid worker (born 1988)

Narges Kalbasi Ashtari (Persian: نرگس کلباسی اشتری, born 21 March 1988, Esfahan), founder of the Prishan Foundation, is a British citizen, originally from Iran.

Ashtari grew up and went to school in Exeter, Devon. In 2010, she set up the Prishan Foundation, named after a blind Sri Lankan boy that Ashtari met, with the aim of 'improving the lives of orphans and abandoned children around the world'. The foundation has built an orphanage for girls in the Rayagada district of Odisha and a home for blind children in Mukundapur in India.
