= Rasul Sadr Ameli =

Iranian film director

Rasoul Sadrameli
- رسول صدرعاملی
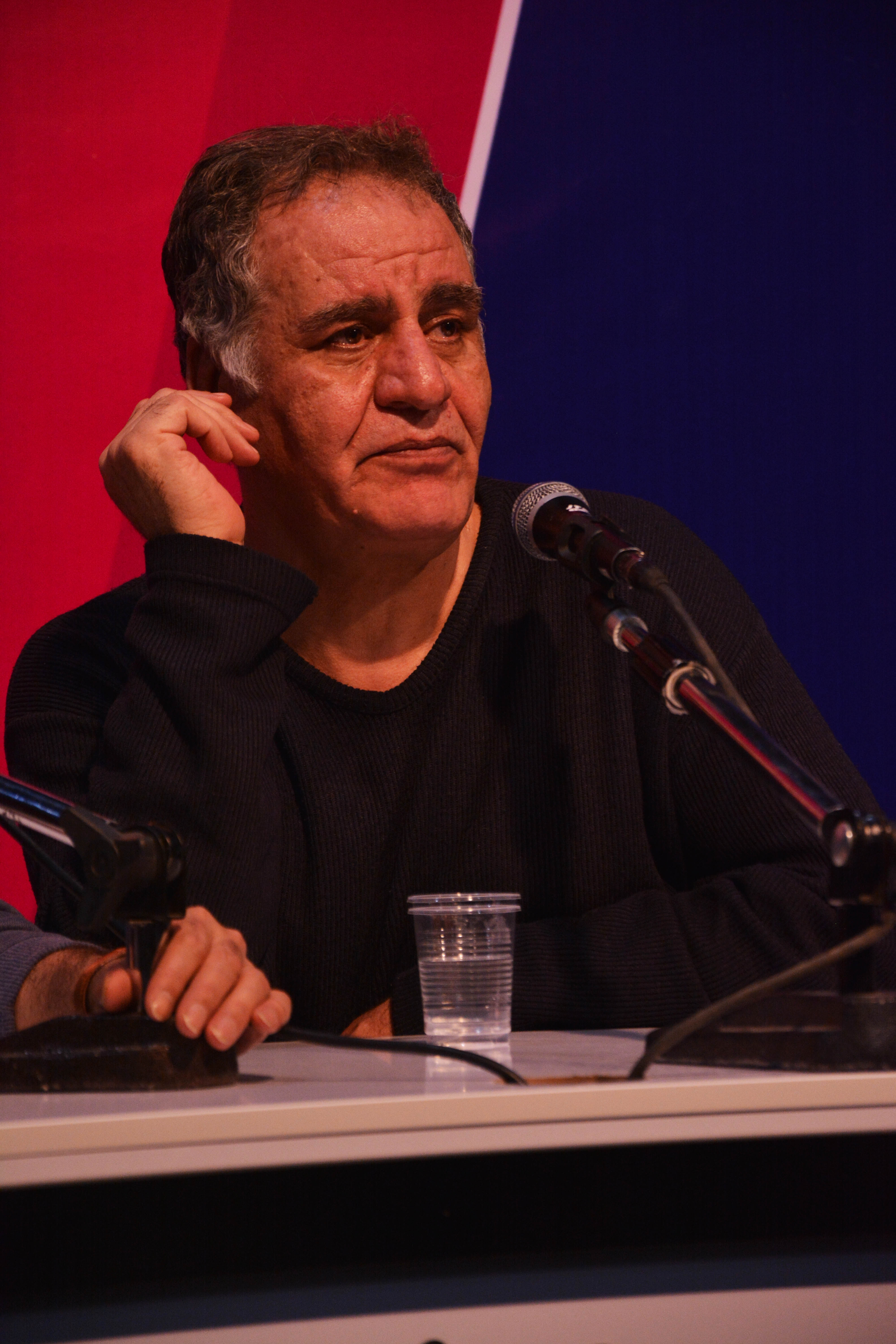
- Rasoul Sadrameli
- Born: Rasoul Sadrghomboli; December 12, 1953 (age 72); Isfahan, Iran
- Occupations: Film director Screenwriter; Journalist; Producer
- Years active: 1982–present
- Website: miladfilm.com

Rasoul Sadr Ameli or Rasul Sadrameli (Persian: رسول صدرعاملی; born December 12, 1954 in Isfahan) is an Iranian film director, screenwriter, journalist and film producer. The Managing Director of MILAD FILM (established in 1979, the first company in the distribution and production of Iranian films after the revolution) began his journalism career when he was just 17. He collaborated with Ettela'at Newspaper as a reporter, story writer and editor of Incident page and then as the Editor of Parliamentary Service. He studied sociology at Paul Valéry University of Montpellier in France. He began his professional activities in the Cinema by producing a film entitled Blood Raining in 1981. This film is the first cinematic project after the revolution.

Sadr Ameli boycotted the Fajr International Film Festival in response to the government's crackdown of the 2025–2026 Iranian protests.

== Filmography (as a director) ==
- The Liberation — 1982
- Deliverance — 1983
- Chrysanthemum — 1985
- During Autumn — 1987
- The Victim — 1991
- Symphony of Tehran — 1993
- The Girl in Sneakers — 1999
- I'm Taraneh, 15 — 2002
- Aida, I Saw Your Father Last Night — 2005
- Every Night Loneliness – 2008
- Life With Closed Eyes — 2010
- Waiting For A Miracle — 2011
- My Second Year in College — 2019
- Whisper My Name – 2025
