= New Era season 1 =

New Era
- Season 1
- Hosted by: Ehsan Alikhani
- Judges: Amin Hayai; Bashir Hosseini; Arya Aziminejad; Roya Nonahali
- Winner: Fatemeh Ebadi
- Runners-up: Mohammad Zare; Parsa Khaef
- No. of episodes: 64

Release
- Original network: IRIB TV3
- Original release: 16 February – 22 August 2019

The first season of New Era, the Iranian talent show, aired on the IRIB TV3 on 16 February 2019. More than 5,000 videos were sent to this program to display their talent. This season was aired on with 64 episode of 60 to 120 minutes.

== Summary ==
=== Second round ===
Advanced to the semi-final	Work	City	People votes
Ninja Girls	Ninja Martial Show	Karaj	3'473'389
Rico Group	Showing gestures	Tehran	3'169'005
Fatemeh Ebadi	Painting with sand	Bandar-e Mahshahr	3'049'932
Saeed Fathiroushan	Magic trick	Hamedan	2'978'617
Piramid Group (41 teen)	Gymnastics	Tehran	2'933'822
Parsa Khaef	Singing	Ardabil	2'926'905
Noandishan Group	Mathematical calculations	Karaj	2'879'969
Shokoofeh Azizi	Dolls	Shiraz	2'798'618
Home Soldiers Group	Showing gestures	Shiraz	2'750'881
Mohammad Zare	Showing gestures	Shiraz	2'661'532
Zahra Beirami	Gymnastics	Tabriz	2'566'149
Sun Boys Group	Acrobatic show	Mashhad	۲٬۴۴۹٬۹۳۰ 2'449'930
Mohammad Mostafa Hesar	Acrobatic show	Shahr-e Qods	2'262'977
Reza Armandpisheh	Singing	Hashtgerd	2'190'136
Mehdi Abdolvand	Arm wrestling	Aligoodarz	1'736'647

=== Semi-final ===
Advanced to final	Work	City	People votes
Fatemeh Ebadi	Painting with sand	Bandar-e Mahshahr	4'603'440
Parsa Khaef	Singing	Ardabil	4'564'570
Saeed Fathiroushan	Magic trick	Tehran	4'234'141
Ninja Girls Group	Ninja Martial Show	Karaj	4'081'320
Mohammad Zare	Showing gestures	Shiraz	4'027'151

=== Final ===
Final Rank	Participant	Work	City	People votes	The amount of winning award
(gold) First	Fatemeh Ebadi	Painting with sand	Bandar-e Mahshahr	6'544'964	5'000'000'000﷼
(silver) Second	Mohammad Zare	Showing gestures	Shiraz	5'916'362	2'000'000'000﷼
(bronze) third	Parsa Khaef	Singing	Ardabil	5'717'064	1'000'000'000﷼
fourth	Saeed Fathiroushan	Magic trick	Tehran	3'148'431	750'000'000﷼
fifth	Ninja Girls Group	Ninja Martial Show	Karaj	3'078'787	500'000'000﷼
