= Amin Hayai =

Iranian actor (born 1970)

- امین حیایی
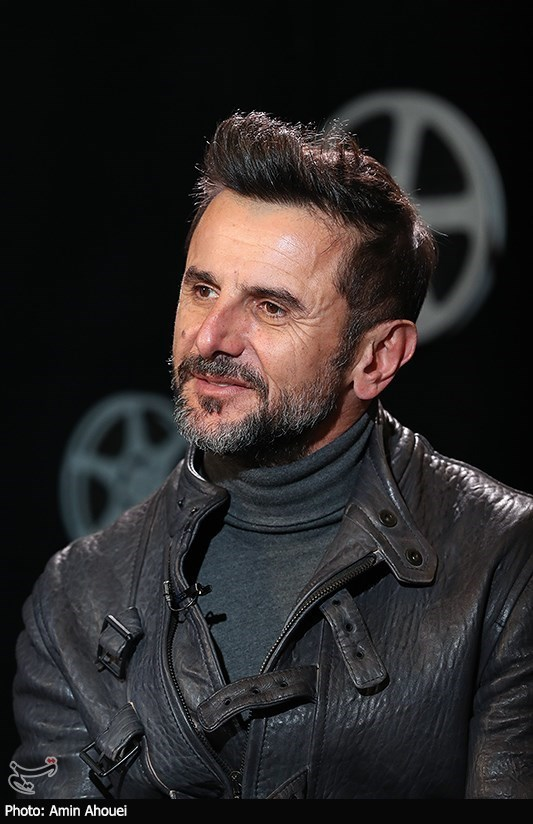
- Hayai in 2022
- Born: June 9, 1970 (age 56); Tehran, Iran
- Occupations: Actor; singer
- Years active: 1991–present
- Spouses: Mona Bankipour (divorced); Niloufar Khoshkholgh (m. 1998)
- Children: 1

Amin Hayai (Persian: امین حیایی; born June 9, 1970) is an Iranian actor. He has received various accolades, including two Crystal Simorghs, three Hafez Awards and an Iran's Film Critics and Writers Association Honorary Diploma, in addition to a nomination for an Iran Cinema Celebration Award.

== Career ==
He started acting in theater along with his education. After finishing high school, he entered military service, and also acted in the art center of air force army. In 1991 he acted in a theatrical show for kids with the directorship of Soraya Ghasemi. It took him long to get a main acting role in movies, and he was successful in his first movie Eve's Red Apple. He has also won the best male actor award in Fajr film festival for the film by Rasoul Sadr-Ameli, "The Night", in 2008.

Hayai appeared in the film Woodpecker in 2018. Hayai also will appear in the film We Like You Miss Yaya which he filmed in 2017. He was awarded the Diploma Honorary for Best Actor for Blazing at the Fajr Film Festival in 2018.

In 2019, he became a judge in the first Iranian Talent Show called Asre Jadid Produced by Ehsan alikhani.

== Personal life ==
He was married to Mona Bankipour and they have a son, Dara Hayai. They were divorced, and he is now married to Niloufar Khoshkholgh, who is an Iranian actress.

Hayai boycotted the Fajr International Film Festival in protest of the government's crackdown of the 2025–2026 Iranian protests.

== Filmography ==
=== Film ===
Year	Title	Role	Director	Notes	Ref(s)
1993	Two Companions		Asghar Hashemi		
1994	Two Faces of the Coin		Mohammad Motevaselani		
1994	The Precipice		Bahram Reypour		
1995	Peace		Ghodratollah Solhmirzaie		
1996	The Special Guard		Parviz Sabri		
2004	Mum's Guest	The Doctor	Dariush Mehrjui		
2007	The Outcast	Bijan	Masoud Dehnamaki		
2008	The Tambourine	Mr. Jafari	Parisa Bakhtavar		
2008	The Night		Rasul Sadr Ameli	Won – Crystal Simorgh Fajr Film Festival Award for Best Actor	
2009	The Outcast 2	Bijan	Masoud Dehnamaki		
2010	Saint Petersburg	The Murderer	Behrouz Afkhami		
2011	The Outcast 3	Bijan	Masoud Dehnamaki		
2012	The Golden Collars	Engineer Kamran	Abolghasem Talebi		
2018	Axing	Rouzbeh	Behrouz Shoeibi		
2018	Flaming	Farid	Hamid Nematollah	Won – Diploma Honorary Fajr Film Festival Award for Best Actor	
2018	Miss Yaya	Azim	Abdolreza Kahani		
2019	Darkhoongah	Reza Misagh	Siavash As'adi		
2019	Lover	Peyman	Kamran Ghadakchian		
2019	Unsophisticated	Behrouz Shabkhiz	Farzad Motamen		
2022	2888		Keyvan Alimohammadi, Ali Akbar Heydari		
2022	The Last Snow	Yousef	Amir Hossein Asgari	Won – Crystal Simorgh Fajr Film Festival Award for Best Actor	
2023	In the Form of Love		Siavash As'adi		
2024	Hawaii		Bahman Goudarzi		
2025	The Killer and the Savage		Hamid Nematollah		
2025	Whisper My Name		Rasoul Sadrameli	Nominated – Crystal Simorgh Fajr Film Festival Award for Best Actor	
2025	Molotov Cocktail		Hossein Amiri Doomari		

=== Web ===
Year	Title	Role	Director	Platform	Notes	Ref(s)
2010–2012	Frozen Heart	Amin	Mohammad Hossein Latifi	Video CD	Main role; season 1–2	
2012–2022	Made in Iran	Gholam Hossein Jafarzadeh	Mohammad Hossein Latifi, Borzou Niknejad, Bahman Goudarzi	Filimo	Main role	
2020–2021	Blue Blood	Behrouz Bahrami	Behrang Tofighi	Filimo, Namava	Main role	
2021–2022	Joker	Himself	Ehsan Alikhani, Seyyed Hamed Mirfattahi	Filimo	Reality show	
2025	Aban	Babak Mahmoudi	Reza Dadooi	Sheyda	Main role	
