= Mohammad Alizadeh =

Iranian footballer (born 1997)

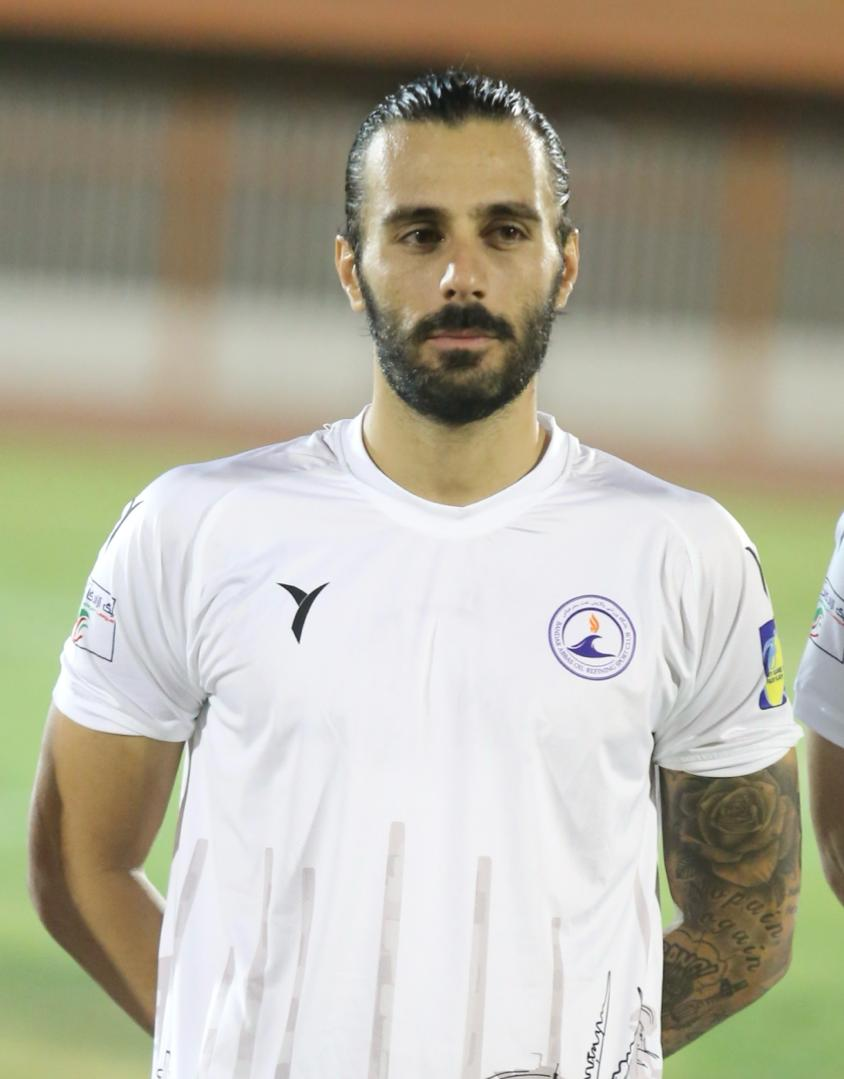
- Mohammad Alizadeh, 2017

Personal information
- Date of birth: 17 June 1997 (age 29)
- Place of birth: Tehran, Iran
- Height: 1.84 m (6 ft 0 in)
- Position: Winger

Team information
- Current team: Pars Jonoubi Jam
- Number: 49

Youth career
- 2009–2018: Saipa

Senior career*
Years	Team	Apps	(Gls)
2018–2019	Saipa		
2019–2022	Oghab Tehran		
2022	Pars Jonoubi Jam		
2022–2023	Vista Turbine		
2023–2024	Khooshe Talaei Saveh		
2024	Pars Jonoubi Jam		
2024–2025	Palayesh Naft		
2025–	Pars Jonoubi Jam		

International career
- Iran U20
- * Club domestic league appearances and goals as of 30 September 2025

Mohammad Alizadeh (Persian: محمد علیزاده; born 17 June 1997) is an Iranian professional football player. He plays as a winger or midfielder for Pars Jonoubi Jam in the Iranian leagues.

== Early life ==
Alizadeh was born in Tehran, Iran. He started playing football at the age of 12 in 2009 with the youth academy of Saipa F.C.. He played in the under-14 (children), under-16 (teenagers), under-19 (youth), under-21 (U-21), and senior teams of Saipa.

He was coached by famous Iranian manager Ali Daei and later joined him in the Asian competitions.

== Club career ==
- Saipa (Senior Team)

35 appearances, 8 goals across two seasons in the Persian Gulf Pro League.

- Khosheh Talai

In the first half of the season: 17 matches, 7 goals.

- Pars Jonoubi Jam (First Period)

In the second half of the season: 17 matches, 5 goals.

- Naft Palayesh Bandar Abbas (under coach Abdollah Veisi)

Full season: 34 matches, 7 goals.

- Return to Pars Jonoubi Jam

Currently playing in the team wearing number 49 as a winger.

- Vista Toorbin

30 matches, 8 goals.

== National team ==
- Played 10 matches for Iran U-20 National Team.

Scored 2 goals and took part in the AFC U-20 qualification matches.

== Honors ==
- Top scorer of Tehran at the youth level.
- Runner-up with the youth team in national championship.
- Third place with U-21 team in Iran.

== Personal life ==
Alizadeh is single. He was born in Tehran and has two brothers. His height is 1.78 meters and he plays mainly with his left foot.
