= Morteza Pashaei =

Iranian singer (1984–2014)

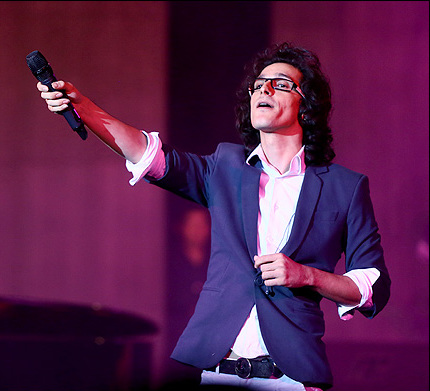
- Pashaei in 2013
- Born: 11 August 1984; Aryashahr, Tehran, Iran
- Died: 14 November 2014 (aged 30); Tehran, Iran
- Resting place: Behesht-e Zahra, Tehran
- Occupations: Singer; musician; composer; music producer
- Years active: 2009–2014
- Musical career
- Genres: Pop music
- Instruments: Vocals; guitar; piano; keyboard
- Labels: Radio Javan; Parsi Record; The Orchard; Sony Music; Universal Music Group; Assay Records; Avang Music; Warner Music Group; Donya Music Group

Morteza Pashaei (Persian: مرتضی پاشایی; 11 August 1984 – 14 November 2014) Morteza Pashaei was an Iranian pop singer, musician, and composer.

Born and raised in Tehran, Pashaei studied graphic design and had been interested in music since his childhood, when he began playing guitar. Less than two decades later, he was diagnosed with stomach cancer in 2013 and hospitalized at Tehran's Bahman Hospital on 3 November 2014. Chemotherapy was administered for the aggressive cancer, but the attempt to slow the cancer failed. His health deteriorated and he died on 14 November 2014, aged 30.

== Early life ==
Morteza Pashaei was born on 11 August 1984 in Aryashahr, Tehran. He had been interested in music since his childhood and began playing the guitar at the age of fourteen. In addition to playing the guitar, he also played the piano. He studied graphic design in Islamic Azad University and graduated in 2009.

== Music career ==
Pashaei began his professional music career in 2009 by publishing his songs on the internet, notably YouTube. As an artist, he was known to be quite innovative. He is best known for his Yeki Hast track (2012).

== Illness and death ==
In late September 2013, it was announced that Pashaei had been diagnosed with stomach cancer. His relatives denied the news but his official website announced that his planned concerts had been cancelled due to Morteza's illness. He appeared with a hat in a TV show one month later and spoke about his illness. He underwent a major surgery before announcing the news.

On 3 November 2014, Pashaei was transferred to Bahman Hospital and was hospitalized in ICU. His doctor mentioned that until his last moments, Pashaei still had hope and he was looking forward to performing at his first Canadian concert in Toronto on 29 November 2014, which was to be the beginning of his Canadian, and eventually international tour. His friend and fellow singer, Farzad Farzin, agreed to do the concert in his place, and perform all of Pashaei's songs in his honour. After his death, he got a letter of recognition from Canada's minister of citizenship and immigration. In the letter, Pashaei was acknowledged for his efforts to promote Iranian culture in Canada, and for his unique talents that had gained him the reputation of a legend in the Iranian community and around the world. Despite his own illness, he also cared for others as well: he accepted the ALS challenge and donated to the cause, while encouraging his fans and other fellow singers to pitch in to help as well.

He died after a long battle with stomach cancer on 14 November 2014 at the age of 30. His funeral was held on 16 November at Vahdat Hall and he was buried at Behesht-e Zahra in a private ceremony at night. Millions of his fans attended his funeral in an unusual procession and recited his songs while he was being buried. Many celebrities attended his memorial ceremony of which Shahab Moradi was the speaker. His death reunited the Iranian people as they grieved the death of the 30-year-old legend. His funeral gathered the largest crowd in Iran since the protests of the 2009 election. His grave was moved to a gravesite that was unknown in Kerman, Iran

== Discography ==
=== Albums ===
Year	Album	Persian native	Ref
2012	There is Someone	یکی هست	
2010	Unique Flower	گل بیتا	
2015	The name is love	اسمش عشقه	
2015	Unique Flower 2 (Bird)	(گُل بیتا ۲ (پرنده	

=== Singles ===
Year	Name	Persian native	Note
2008	Be Dadesh Residam	به دادش رسيدم	
2009	Shayad Beporsi	شاید بپرسی	
2009	Adam Kosh	آدم کش	
2011	Bezar Begam	بذار بگم	
2011	Mimiram	می‌میرم	
2011	Yeki Hast	یکی هست	
2011	Ziyadi	زیادی	
2011	‌Be Gooshet Mirese	به گوشت میرسه	
2010	Gole Atlasi	گل اطلسی	
2011	Eshghe Man	عشق من	
2011	Cheshmaye Man	چشمای من	
2011	To Rast Migi	تو راست میگی	
2011	Gerye Kon	گریه کن	
2011	Adam Ahani	آدم آهنی	
2011	Baraye Nasser	برای ناصر	In memory of Nasser Hejazi
2011	Mikham Begam	میخوام بگم	
2012	Chand Rooz	چند روز	
2012	Setayesh	ستایش	
2012	Bia Bargard	بیا برگرد	
2012	Dorogh Dost Dashtani	دروغ دوست داشتنی	
2012	Chetoor Delet Omad	چطور دلت اومد	
2012	Ro To Bargardon	روتو برگردون	
2012	Hala Omadi	حالا اومدی	
2012	Dele Man, Dele To	دل من؛ دل تو	
2013	Nafas	نفس	
2013	Jadeye Yek Tarafeh	جاده یک طرفه	
2013	Mahe Man	ماه من	
2013	Gole Bita	گل بیتا	
2013	Mano Bebakhsh	ادعای عشق	
2013	Mesle Shisheh	مثل شیشه	
2013	Mahe Man	ماه من	
2013	Ghasam	قسم	
2013	Boghz	بغض	Presentation to Benyamin Bahadori
2014	Roze Barfi	روز برفی	With Mohammad Reza Golzar
2014	Asre Paeezi	عصر پائیزی	
2014	Rozhaye Sakht	روزهای سخت	
2014	Yadete	یادته	
2014	To Fekretam	تو فکرتم	
2014	Taghsir	تقصیر	
2014	Negaran Mani	نگران منی	
2014	To Rafti	تو رفتی	
2014	Ghalbam Ro Tekrare	قلبم رو تکراره	
2014	Parvane	پروانه	
2014	Sareto Bar Nagardondi (‌Khahesh)	(سرت رو برنگردوندی (خواهش	
2014	Man O To	من و تو	ft. Omid Ameri
2015	Kojaei	کجایی	
2015	Ki Fekresho Mikard	کی فکرشو میکرد	
2015	Baroon	بارون	
2015	Yadam Bashi	یادم باشی	
2015	Gheyre Momken	غیر ممکن	
2016	Ye Rooz Khoob Mireseh	يه روز خوب ميرسه	
2016	Cold Tuesday	سه‌شنبه‌ی سرد	
2017	Letter	نامه	
2018	Boghze Taraneh	بغض ترانه	
2018	Regret	حسرت	With Sina Sarlak
2018	Nafasami	نفسمی	
2019	Don't Cry	گریه نکن	
2019	Entezar	انتظار	
2019	‌ Hamnafas	همنفس	
2019	Breathe	نفس بکش	
2020	Eshghe Janjali	عشق جنجالی	
2020	Mese Setareh	مثه ستاره	
2020	Forget About Me	فراموشم کن	
2020	Nagoo	نگو	
2020	Barat Minevisam	برات می نویسم	
2020	Gele Daram	گله دارم	released on Pashaei's birthday
