= Reza Sadeghi =

Iranian pop singer and songwriter (born 1979)

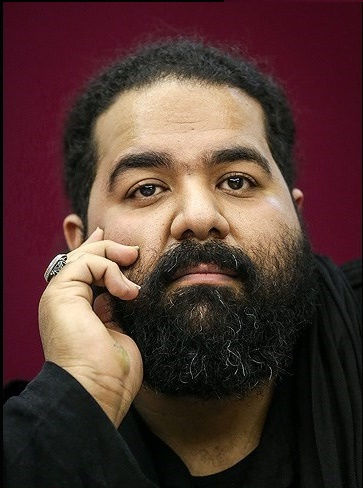
- Born: 16 August 1979 (age 47); Bandar Abbas, Iran
- Occupations: Singer-songwriter; composer; writer
- Children: 2
- Musical career
- Genres: Persian pop
- Instruments: Vocals; guitar; piano; musical keyboard
- Years active: 1992–present
- Website: rezasadeghi.com

Reza Sadeghi (Persian: رضا صادقی, born 16 August 1979) is an Iranian pop singer, songwriter, and multi-instrumentalist, and one of the most popular domestic singers in Iran. He is praised for his vocals and songwriting, which are mainly about the subject of love. He has performed live concerts in different cities around Iran and other countries, including Germany and the United States.

== Personal life ==
Born in 1979, Reza Sadeghi was raised in Bandar Abbas, Hormozgan, and then moved to Tehran at 5. He was a close friend of former domestic footballer Ali Ansarian, who he befriended in primary school.

Reza Sadeghi's first spouse died in a car crash in which he was left paralyzed and was required to use an assistive cane for the rest of his life, including during concerts, where he usually rests beside a cane. Since the crash, Sadeghi has decided to appear in public in fully black clothing. Due to this, he is known as Siah Poosh (lit. who wears black, or man in black). Many of his compositions are based around black, including his best-known song Meshki Rang-e Eshghe (Black is the Color of Love).

During Sadeghi's Germany tour, he met and proposed to an Iranian resident of Germany. Together, they have two girls named Tiara and Viana, aged 7 and 4, respectively.

== Music and film career ==
Reza Sadeghi initially picked up guitar lessons and recorded his first compositions, which circulated in his hometown years later. Facing financial difficulties in Tehran, Sadeghi turned to music as a professional career. Initially appearing on live radio, Sadeghi released his first songs to a small reception, including the single Raz-e Eshgh (Secret of Love), and his first album of the same title. Sadeghi joined the band Kimia (کیمیا), releasing four more albums, until he left the group after the release of Gol-e Laleh. He gradually built up a base and organized concerts in Tehran, including one in front of 15,000 at Sa'dabad Complex. He then moved to Mehrshahr, a small town near Karaj.

Sadeghi's first foreign tour was in Germany in 2011. He also toured in major cities of the United States in his 2016 US Tour.

In 2008, Mostafa Mansourian released a biographical film named Ramze Shab (Secret of the Night), based around Reza Sadeghi's personal life. Reza Sadeghi also appeared alongside Mohammad Reza Foroutan, Afshin Hashemi, Pegah Ahangarani, in the film Bi khodahafezi^{[fa]} (Without a Goodbye) which is partially based on his life.

== Discography ==
- 2021 Havaset be man bashe
- 2019 Zendegi Kon (Live The Life)
- 2017 Yani Dard (Pain Means)
- 2016 Shabe Barooni (Raining Night)
- 2015 Faghat Goosh Kon (Just Listen)
- 2013 Hamin (That's It)
- 2011 Dige Meshki Nemipoosham (I Won't Wear Black Anymore)
- 2019 Malakut (Realm of Dominion)
- 2009 Yeki bud yeki nabud (Once Upon a Time)
- 2006 Vaysa Donya (Stop, World)
- 2005 Pirhan Meshki (Black Shirt)
- 2005 Delam Barat Misooze (My Heart Burns for You) _{Rehearsal}
- 2004 Parchame Meshki (The Black Flag) _{Rehearsal}
- 2004 Koma (Coma) _{Rehearsal}
- 2003 Meshki Range Eshghe (Black Is the Color of Love)
- 2002 Hekayat Meshki Poosh (Story of the Meshki Poosh) _{lit. Man in Black}
- 2001 Ashegham Man (I'm in Love)
- 2000 10 Saniye (10 Seconds)
- 2000 Gol-e Laleh (Tulip)
- 2000 Ruyay-e Shirin (A Sweet Dream)
- 1999 Mastane va Divane (Drunk and Crazy)
- 1997 Bandar Ghadim (Old Bandar)
- 1992 Raz-e Eshgh (Secret of Love)

== See also ==
- Persian pop music
