= Ehsan Alikhani =

Iranian television presenter

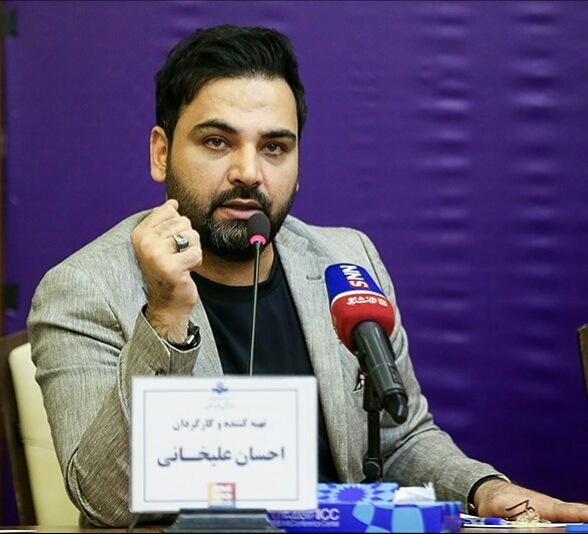
- Alikhani in 2019
- Born: November 6, 1982 (age 43); Tehran, Iran
- Education: Bachelor in Business Management, University of Tehran PG Student in Sociology
- Occupations: Producer; Presenter; Director
- Years active: Director (Since 2002); Presenter (Since 2004); Producer (Since 2009)
- Employer: Islamic Republic of Iran Broadcasting
- Known for: Mah-e asal from IRIB TV3; New Era from IRIB TV3
- Television: Mah-e asal; New Era; Three Stars; Orange Spring; Joker
- Height: 1.88 m (6 ft 2 in)
- Parents: Mahmood Alikhani (father); Maryam zamzam (mother)
- Awards: Statue of the best TV face of the 17th Hafez celebration; Statue of the best performance for the honeymoon program of the 5th Jam Jam TV Festival; Statue of the best TV face of the 20th Hafez celebration

Ehsan Alikhani (Persian: احسان علیخانی; born 6 November 1982, in Tehran) is an Iranian producer, television presenter, and director.

He is a graduate of Business Administration from the University of Tehran. The first live program that he worked as a presenter was in 2001. He has performed in programs such as The Morning Came, Mah-e Asal, Three Stars, Orange Spring, New Era, and more. He first appeared in front of the camera as a presenter on the TV program Iranian Boys and after performing Tide, he became a figure with the Mah-e Asal program. He is currently working on television as the director, producer and host of a talent show called New Era, of which two seasons have been produced and aired. Alikhani has the experience of investing-producing in movies such as No Date, No Signature and The Last Snow, the former was the product of the Jalilvand brothers (Vahid Jalilvand and Ali Jalilvand) and the second was produced by Hassan Mostafavi, production manager of second season of Shahrzad.

== Career ==
He has performed programs such as Sobh Amad, Mah-e asal, Three Stars, Asre Jadid, and so on. He first appeared in front of the camera as a presenter on the TV show "Irony Boys" and after appearing on "Tide", he became a figure with the honeymoon program. He is currently working on television as the director, producer and host of a talent show called New Age, of which two seasons have been made and aired so far.

== Start of activity ==
He started his career in the office of a filmmaker as a member of the stage team and assistant director, then went into television and made commercials, teasers and short documentaries. He appeared in front of the camera for the first time in the TV program "Iranian Boys" as a presenter, and after performing the program "Tide", he became a figure with "Honeymoon".

=== Acting ===
He was both an actor and an assistant director in the series Unknown Cases directed by Jamal Shoorjeh. He says that I had a very bad role and - in the role of a salesman - I was addicted to the first role of the series in the park.

- Unknown files (2004 Jamal Shoorjeh) Network 2

== Controversies ==
Alikhani, in response to Ahmadinejad, who said that the essentials of Nowruz are not expensive in our alley, the people of Tehran can come and buy Nowruz from our neighborhood, said that it is expensive, people can see and can not buy from your alley, and so on. He was reprimanded and banned from acting on television. But a day later, rumors of Alikhani being banned were denied.

In July 2015, rumors and, of course, speculations about the payment of wages were raised to Ehsan Alikhani, who reported that he had asked for one billion and two hundred million tomans to host a special one-month honeymoon program. In addition, he has received an amount of over two hundred million tomans for the right of "producer". He also reacted sharply to recent criticism in one episode of the show, saying that the income from filming weddings is higher than that of a producer with a television background.

In July 2017, it was revealed that a contract had been signed between Alikhani, the presenter of the popular Ramadan program, and "Dr. Mir Ali" to provide financial support for the program, while the title of doctor was given to the CEO of the institution. It was fake.

This news, which was first published by Shargh Media newspaper, was immediately republished on social networks, and the reaction of public opinion was not to forging the title of doctor, but to receiving 3 billion Tomans for advertising an unauthorized credit institution and the title of "gift" for part of the funds received. It has been.

Ehsan Alikhani participated in the Hala Khorshid program on Saturday, July 21, 2016, and accepted receiving 3 billion Tomans for financial support from the Samen Hajj Institute; However, he said that he received this amount as the official producer introduced by the Radio and Television Organization of Iran to this institute and to finance the production of 6 series and not one series, which was necessary according to the budget of the Radio and Television Organization. He also explained that at the time of concluding the financial support agreement with this institution, Samen Hajj had an official license and added that Rials was not one of these three billion Tomans (gift) and Samen Hajj was the financial sponsor of these 6 series of programs. His defense, however, was again met with a backlash from the public, who either dismissed his response as inadequate or as a one-sided judgment that the broadcaster would not provide an equal opportunity to others charged in this and similar cases.

== Awards ==
Year	awards	Grouping	Work	Result	Ref
2019	The twentieth celebration of Hafez	The best TV face	Asre Jadid	Won	
2018	Young fellow citizen	The face of the year 2018 of Iran TV from the perspective of the audience	Asre Jadid	Won	
2018	Broadcasting	The most popular TV presenter	Asre Jadid	Won	
2018	The fifth Jam Jam TV Festival	The best TV presenter	Mah-e asal، Asre Jadid	Won	
2018	IRIB	The best performer of the year delivery programs	Citrus aurantium	Won	
2017	The seventeenth celebration of Hafez	The best TV face	Mah-e asal	Won	
2013	The third Jam Jam TV Festival	The best host of talk shows	Mah-e asal	Won	

== Execution and planning ==
- Asre Jadid of "Program Host and Producer" (Channel 3)
- Asre Jadid studio "Host and Producer" (Channel 3)
- Asre Jadid Hashtag "Host and Producer" (Channel 3)
- The new era of "presenter and producer of the program"
- Mah-e asal (2007–2018) (Channel 3)
- Producer and special executor of the delivery program of Channel 3 from 2008 to 2009
- Behind the Scenes (2012, 2013)
- Orange Spring (Special Delivery Program for 2015)
- Two halves of an apple (2013)
- Designer, producer and presenter of the Mah-e asal program (especially the Ramadan program of Channel 3) in (2013,2017)
- Three stars "host and producer" (special program for selecting the best TV in (2014, 2015, 2016) from the people's point of view)
- Three Stars (2014)
- Tide (2005, 2006)
- The morning came (2004)
- Good morning Iran
- Irony Boys (Summer 2004)
- Peaks of Pride
- Mehrvarzan Club
- Producer of Confidential Programs - Baron Perfume - Like Nobody - High Light - Please See
- Director of Sheikh Baha'i Documents - Isfahan Physics Olympiad
- Directing 2 anniversaries of Channel 3
- Directing 2 periods of the celebration of the hero of heroes
- 20th Celebration of Hafez "Ceremony"
