= Ali Sadeghi =

Iranian actor

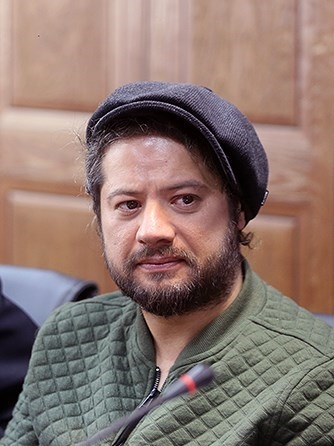
- Sadeghi at a press conference of the TV series Noon Khe
- Born: 21 September 1980 (age 45); Tehran, Iran
- Occupation: Actor
- Years active: 1991–present

Ali Sadeghi (Persian: علی صادقی) is an Iranian actor. His first work was in the series, My Best Summer, with a look at the Iran-Iraq war.

== Filmography ==
=== Movies ===
Year	Title	Director
2020	Zanha Fereshteand 2	Arash Moayerian
2019	x Large	Mohsen Tavakkoli
2019	Salam Aleykoom Haj Agha	Hossein Tabrizi
2018	Doom soorkh Ha	Arash Moayerian
2018	Dash Akool	Mohammad Arab
2018	Khaltoor	Arash Moayerian
2017	Million Dollar Baby	Omid Niaz
2017	Patoo Kafshe Man Nakoon	Mohammad Hossein Farahbakhsh
2016	Panjah Kiloo Albaloo	Mani Haghighi
2013	Merajiha	Masoud Dehnamaki
2012	Adam Ahani	Rahim Behboodi Far
2011	Yek Farari Bagboo	Hatef Alimardani
2011	No Men Allowed	Rambod Javan
2010	Pitza Makhloot	Hossein Ghasemi Jami
2010	3 daraje Tab	Hamid Reza SalahMand
2010	Voorood zandeha Mamnooe	Javad Mazdabadi
2010	Hame Chi Aroome	Mostafa Mansooryar
2009	Marriage in overtime	Saeed Soheili
2009	Checkmate	Jamshid Heidari
2009	Afternoon Dog	Mostafa Kiyaee
2009	Shir Va Asal	Arash Moayerian
2008	tigh Zan	Alireza Davood Nejad
2008	zendegi shirin	Ghodratollah Solhmirzaee
2008	ghatelin pir mard	Dariush Rabiee
2006	age mitooni manou begir	Shahed Ahmadloo
2004	hoou	Alireza Davood Nejad
2004	hasht pa	Alireza Davood Nejad
2003	piknik dar meydan jang	Rahim Hosseini
2003	Revayat 3gane	Abdolhossein Barzid
2003	Mr	Omid Bedehkar

=== series ===
Title	Year	Director
div va mahpishoni	2021	Hossein Ghenaat
Noon khe 3	2021	Saeed Aghakhani
Tweezers	2020	Hossein Tabrizi
Noon Khe	2020	Saeed Aghakhani
tatilat tabestani	2018	Alireza Amini
Halat Khas	2015	Afshin arbabi
Signal Mojood Ast	2014	Mahdi Mazloomi
Ma Fereshte Nistim	2013	Felora Sam
toghif	2012	Ahmad Zakeri
Noghte Sarkhat	2011	Saeed Aghakhani
kasi khabe ?	2011	Javad Razavian
moj ou sokhreh	2010	Majid Salehi
khosh neshin ha	2010	Saeed Aghakhani
ZanBaba	2010	Saeed Aghakhani
Eyde Emsal	2009	Saeed Aghakhani
Bazangah	2009	Reza Attaran
3dar Chahar	2008	Majid Salehi
Zendegi be Sharte Khande	2008	Mahdi Mazloumi
Gharargah Maskooni	2007	Javad Razavian
The Accused Escaped	2005	Reza Attaran
Khaneh be Doosh	2003	Reza Attaran
Acacia Alley	2003	Reza Attaran
Pooshte Konkouriha	2001	Parisa Bakhtavar
Dardesar Valedein	2000	Masoud Navabi
Partouhaye Noor	1998	Mohsen Yousefi
Farzandan Iran	1995	Amir Samvati
Behtarin Tabestane Man	1995	Ali Bahador
Barname Tarkibi Bahareh	1993	Amir Samvati
Barname Tarkibi Tabestaneh	1992	Amir Samvati
Barname Tarkibi Paeeizeh	1992	Amir Samvati
Aftab Alam	1990	Amir Samvati
