= Arzhang Amirfazli =

Iranian actor, comedian, Set Decorator, Writer and director

- ارژنگ امیرفضلی
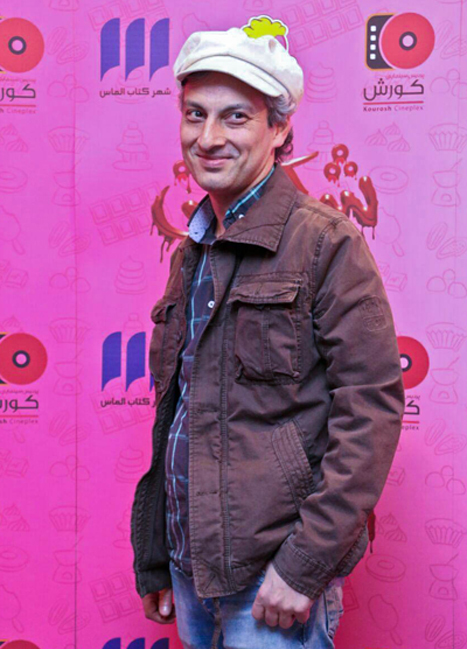
- In November 2017
- Born: 13 May 1970 (age 56); Tehran, Iran
- Occupations: Actor, comedian, set decorator, writer and director
- Years active: 1988-2020

Arzhang Amirfazli (Persian: ارژنگ امیرفضلی) is an Iranian actor, comedian, writer, director and also worked for several years in designing and making TV set decorations.

Due to nationwide protests related to the death of Mahsa Amini and the people in September 2022, Arzhang Amirfazli said goodbye to the world of acting in Iranian cinema and television by posting a post on Instagram. Shortly after, he moved to Canada with his family and has been living there since then.

== Career ==
Amirfazli graduated from the Graphic College. He started his career with theater in 1988. His father was actor, director and voice actor Hossein Amirfazli. His first appearance on Iranian national TV was back in 1993 with Mehran Modiri and Hamid Lolayi in the sitcom Nowrooz 72 which was broadcast during Nowrooz.

== Filmography ==
Year	Title	Director	Notes
1994	Elo, I'm JoJo	Marzieh Boroomand	
1998	victorious warrior	Mojtaba Raee	
2001	sweet jam	marzieh boroumand	
2004	whirlpool [gerdab]	Hasan Hedayat	
2004	sharlatan	Arash Moayerian	
2005	wedding dinner [sham-e-aroosi]	Ebrahim Vahidzadeh	
2007	Ekhrajiha 1 and 2	Masoud Dehnamaki	
2008	az ma behtaroon	Mohsen Farid	
2008	roommate	Mehrdad Farid	
2008	wink	jahangir jahangiri	
2009	the secret of TARAN plain	Mohamad Lotfali & Hatef Alimardani	
2009	democracy in bright day [democracy dar rooz roshan]	Ali Atshani	
2009	Trial on the Street	Masoud Kimiai	
2010	The Kingdom of Solomon	Shahriar Bahrani	
2010	2 Sisters	Mohammad Banki	
2010	EfratiHa	Jahangir Jahangiri	
2010	whatever God wills [har che khoda bekhahad]	Navid Mihandoost	
2010	Jordan street robbers	Vahid Eslami	
2011	twelve chairs	Ebrahim Bbarary	
2015	chaos [ashoob]	Kazem Rastgoftar	
2015	Four Esfehani in Baghdad	Mohamadreza Momtaz	
2016	chocolate	Soheil Movafagh	
2017	DASH AKOL	Mohamad Arab	
2017	KATYOSHA	Ali Atshani	
2018	Small heroes	Hosein Ghenaat	
2019	Thief and angel	Hosein Ghenaat	
2019	Lazania	Ahmad Ahmadi	

== TV series ==
Year	name	Director	Notes
1991	norooz 72	Dariush Kardan Mehrdad Khosravi	Network 1, actor
1992	Flight 57	Mehran Modiri	Fajr decade 1993, writer & actor
1992-1993	Happy Hour	Mehran Ghafourian	Nowruz 2000, set decorator & writer & actor
1996-1998	jedi nagirid	saeed tavakol	network 3 < set decorator & actor
1998–1999	Hello little	Reza Jian Sima Ilkhan	Network Children and Adolescents Program 1, actor
1999	Stories of Folani	Arzhang Amirfazli	Network 5, writer & actor & director
1999-2000	These few people	Mehran Ghafourian	Network 3, writer & actor
1998	Letter to letter	Mehran Ghafourian	Network 1, writer & actor
2000	Mr. Hesabi	Behrooz Baqaei Sasan Amirpour	Channel 2, actor
2001	Nowruziha	Behrooz Baqaei	Network 1, writer & actor & set decorator
1999	Dar Sharh	Arzhang Amirfazli	Director, writer, Set Designer
2001	like lif	Behrooz Baqaei	Network Children and Adolescents Program 1, actor & writer,
2002	In the house	Arzhang Amirfazli & Kamran Malekmotiee	network 1, writer & director
2003	Zange Akhar	Nima Fallah	actor
2003	The Future	Arzhang Amirfazli	writer & director
2003	Hamineh	Arzhang Amirfazli	Actor, art director, Writer . Children and Adolescents Program of Network 1
2005	Residential Camp	seyed javad razavian	It was broadcast on Nowruz 2008, actor
2005-2006	gheshgheregh	Arzhang Amirfazli Massoud Froutan	writer & director, actor
2007	Salam	mohamad reza farzin	Tehran Network, actor
2008	Sweet Wishes	Vahid Hosseini	Network 1, actor
2009	Meeting	seyed javad hashemi	TV series, actor
2010	shamsol emareh	Saman Moghaddam	TV aeries, actor
2010	Coins of Chance	Majid Torbatifard	Network 1, actor
2010	limoo torsh	seyed javad razavian	Network 1, actor
2011	Foggy Tabriz	Mohamad Reza Varzi	
2010	Dani and I 3	Arzhang Amirfazli	Tehran Network
2012	Suitcase	khosro malekan	Broadcast in Ramadan 2012 on Channel 2, actor & writer
2011	Rental House	Ramin Naser Nasir	actor
2013	Does anyone sleep?	seyed javad razavian	Nowruz 1391, actor
2013	Tehran No. 1	mehdi mazloomi	actor
2014	golbahar	ebrahim moayeri	Producer of Pouran Derakhshandeh, actor
2013	My whole family	Dariush Farhang	It was broadcast on Nowruz, actor
2017 & 2018	Khandevaneh	Rambod Javan	Nasim Network, writer & actor
2001	chehel tikeh	Arzhang Amirfazli	writer, director
2015	flower neiberhood	ahmad darvish ali poor	NetworkTwo, actor
2017	Flower and Nightingale Neighborhood 2	Ahmad Darvish Alipour	Network Two, actor
2017	Legend of the Millipedes	Shahab Abbasi	Nasim Network, actor
2018	Six and a half heroes	hosein ghenat	Tehran Network (5), actor
2018	Hashtag khaleh sooskeh	Mohamad Moslemi	visual medium, actor
2019	Salman the Persian	Davood Mir-Bagheri	actor
