= Tweezers (TV series) =

2020 TV series

- Persian: موچین
- Moochin
- Genre: Comedy drama
- Written by: Hossein Tabrizi
- Directed by: Hossein Tabrizi
- Starring: Hamid Lolayi; Ali Sadeghi; Mehran Rajabi Rabeh Oskouie; Marjaneh Golchin; Pouria Poursorkh; Behnoosh Bakhtiari; Afshin Sangchap; Reza Tavakoli; Zhale Dorostkar; Rose Razavi; Asha Mehrabi; Shohreh Lorestani
- Theme music composer: Makan Band
- Composer: Reza Khosravi
- Country of origin: Iran
- Original language: Persian
- No. of seasons: 1
- No. of episodes: 17

Production
- Executive producer: Jamal Goli
- Producer: Meisam Ahangari
- Production location: Tehran
- Cinematography: Omid Negareshi
- Editor: Hossein Ghazanfari
- Running time: 45 minutes

Original release
- Network: Home video
- Release: 1 July – 12 November 2020

Tweezers (Persian: موچین; Moochin) is an Iranian comedy-drama television series. The series is directed by Hossein Tabrizi.

== Plot ==
Farzad and Sima are engaged to each other, but Sima's father has stipulated that Sima's older sister Mina must marry first. Farzin tells Farzad that I will sacrifice myself and propose to Mina...

== Cast ==
- Hamid Lolayi
- Ali Sadeghi
- Mehran Rajabi
- Rabeh Oskouie
- Marjaneh Golchin
- Pouria Poursorkh
- Behnoosh Bakhtiari
- Afshin Sangchap
- Reza Tavakoli
- Zhale Dorostkar
- Rose Razavi
- Asha Mehrabi
- Shohreh Lorestani
- Amir Noori
- Abbas Jamshidifar
- Zahra Bahrami
- Ramin Naser Nasir
- Saed Hedayati
- Mohammad Fili
- Behrad Kharazi
- Fatemeh Shokri
- Hossein Tabrizi
