= Neda Ghasemi =

Iranian actress (born 1987)

- ندا قاسمی
- Born: June 20, 1987 (age 38); Kermanshah, Iran
- Occupations: TV host, actress
- Employer: IRIB

Neda Ghasemi (Persian: ندا قاسمی; born June 20, 1987) is a dubber and actress in Iranian theater and television.

== Biography ==
Ghasemi was born in Kermanshah, Iran on June 20, 1987. She started acting in the theater in 2007. Then she collaborated with this center in Kermanshah Central Radio and Television as an actor and presenter in various programs and since 1993 she has worked as an announcer, dubber and actor in Kermanshah Radio Show Unit. She is also a PhD student in Organic Chemistry at the University of Tehran.

In addition to acting in theater and television, she also does dubbing work. She started acting in theater at the age of 20, and in 1995, she was nominated for Best Actress at the 35th Fajr International Theater Festival for her occasional performance. She also made her acting debut on TV by playing a role in the series Noon Khe, directed by and starring Saeed Aghakhani.

"The further we go, the more the writer sees the characters in the actors, and naturally, he becomes more aware than before of what he writes for the actor and what adventures and characteristics engage him," he said of Shirin and her marriage story. Neda Ghasemi has played a role in the radio series Purple Heart, directed by Mirtaher Mazloumi.
