= Char Khooneh =

2007 Iranian TV series

- چارخونه
- Developed by: Soroush Sehhat
- Written by: Soroush Sehhat; Bahman Motamedian
- Directed by: Soroush Sehhat
- Starring: Hamid Lolayi; Maryam Amir Jalali; Javad Razavian; Reza Shafiei Jam; Ardalan Shoja Kaveh; Falamak Joneidi; Behnoosh Bakhtiari; Mohammad Shiri; Asghar Heydari; Farhad Pour Gorjani; Vahid Mahin-dust; Mohammad Amiri Mehr; Hossein Rahmani Manesh
- Narrated by: Soroush Sehhat
- Opening theme: "Mishe Del Be In Bast" by Javad Razavian
- Ending theme: "Charkhuneh" by Javad Razavian
- Country of origin: Iran
- Original language: Persian
- No. of episodes: 108

Production
- Executive producer: Mohsen Chegini
- Running time: 40 minutes

Original release
- Network: Channel 3 (IRIB)
- Release: 30 June 2007 – 8 January 2008

Char Khooneh or Charkhooneh (Persian: چارخونه, Tattersall) is a 2007 Iranian television sitcom. The show chronicles the lives of the Jamali family, set within the four-unit apartment building they own. A total of 108 episodes were aired, every Friday at 10:00pm from 30 June 2007 to 8 January 2008. The possible suggestion that the character of Shanbeh was Afghan stirred controversy among the Afghan community in Iran, who judged the character was an offensive representation of their mores and culture, which led to the series being eventually cancelled.

== Plot ==
The title, "Char Khooneh," serves as a pun, meaning both "plaid" and "four houses." The Jamali family occupies and owns a four-unit apartment building. Mansour Jamali, husband of Shokouh Jamali, is employed at an Egg and Hen Company and eagerly anticipates a promotion to manager. Once he secures the position, he encounters difficulties and is replaced by the boss's nephew, Farzad Paknejad. Farzad also rents an apartment from Shokouh and gradually develops a romantic relationship with their daughter, Parastoo. Parastoo, a third-year psychology student at the local university, enjoys applying the concepts she learns in class to her family interactions. The family's other daughter Rana works as a flight attendant, while her husband Hamed, an aspiring singer, performs in nearly every episode, eagerly awaiting the day he achieves fame and releases his album. Nazir Shanbeh, a comically sycophantic caretaker, is welcomed into the family by Shokouh. He is known for his amusing accents, high-pitched screams, and emotional outbursts when things don't go as planned. Despite the wild escapades the characters experience, they ultimately form a loving and tight-knit family.

== Cast ==
- Reza Shafiei Jam - Hamed/Char Shanbeh
- Hamid Lolayi - Mansour Jamali
- Behnoosh Bakhtiari - Parastoo
- Maryam Amir Jalali - Shokouh Jamali
- Falamak Joneidi - Rana
- Mohammad Shiri - Farokh
- Asghar Heydari - Moradi
- Ardalan Shoja Kaveh - Farzad
- Payam Khajooyei
- Reza Karimi
- Javad Razavian - Nazir Shanbeh
- Sahar Valadbeigi - Hengameh
- Hossein Rahmani Manesh

== Crew ==
- Director: Soroush Sehhat
- Producer: Mohsen Chegini
- Writers: Soroush Sehat
- Singer: Javad Razavian
