= Pouria Poursorkh =

Iranian actor

- پوریا پورسرخ
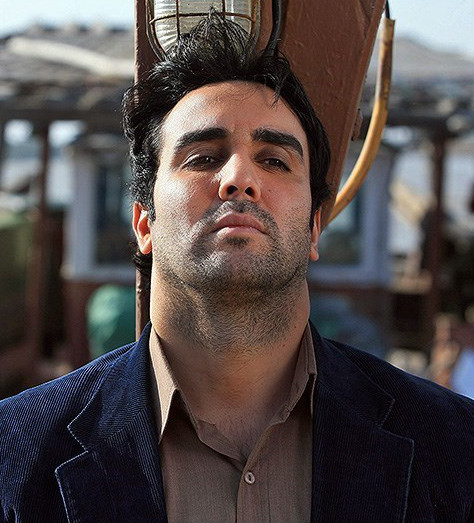
- Born: 25 June 1977 (age 49); Tehran, Iran
- Education: Islamic Azad University, Science and Research branch
- Occupation: Actor
- Years active: 2005–present
- Notable work: The Third Day; Kimia; The Brother
- Awards: Crystal Simorgh (2007)

Pouria Poursorkh (Persian: پوریا پورسرخ, born 25 June 1977) is an Iranian actor. He received a Crystal Simorgh for Best Supporting Actor at the 25th Fajr Film Festival, in addition to multiple nominations for Hafez Awards.

== Early life ==
Pouriya Poursorkh was born in Tehran and is the eldest child in his family. He has two younger sisters and one younger brother. His mother is an English language teacher, and his father is a retiree from the National Iranian Oil Company. Poursorkh holds a PhD in Plant Physiology and entered the acting industry with a role in the television series Farar-e Bozorg.

== Career ==
After attending acting classes with Mohammad Hossein Latifi and building a relationship with him, Pouriya Poursorkh was set to work as Latifi’s assistant in 2005. However, when one of the actors in the series Farar-e Bozorg was unavailable, Poursorkh stepped in, marking his entry into the acting world.

In 2006, Poursorkh gained recognition as a fresh face with his role in the series Vafa, directed by Mohammad Hossein Latifi, and continued his acting career with diverse roles. That same year, his performance in the film Rooz-e Sevom, also directed by Latifi, earned him a nomination for Best Actor at the Fajr International Film Festival. He furthered his career with roles in films such as Anahita (2008, directed by Azizollah Hamidnejad), Ayar 14 (2008, directed by Parviz Shahbazi), and Rooz-e Rastakhiz (2013, directed by Ahmadreza Darvish). Additionally, Poursorkh played the lead role in Mr. Alef, the first 3D film in Iranian cinema, directed by Ali Atshani. He also starred as a main actor in the television series Kimia.

== Personal life ==
Pouriya Poursorkh married in 2019 and officially confirmed his marriage during the Nowruz 2020 television program.

== Filmography ==
=== Films ===
| Year | Film's name | Director | Release date |
|---|---|---|---|
| 2021 | Angel Street Bride | Mehdi Khosravi | |
| 2019 | Unsophisticated | Farzad Motamen | Filming |
| 2018 | Mediteranea | Hadi Hajatmand | 2019 |
| 2018 | Hello Haj Agha | Hossein Tabrizi | Filming |
| 2017 | In the Time of Hangover | Mohammad Hossein Latifi | 2017 |
| 2017 | Patio | Maryam Bahrololoomi | 2017 |
| 2017 | Khaltour | Arash Moayerian | 2017 |
| 2015 | Love and Madness | Hasan Najafi | 2015 |
| 2015 | Lovers Die Standing | Shahram Maslakhi | Private release - 2015 |
| 2014 | Camera | Mohsen Tavakoli | Private release |
| 2014 | Lamp 100 | Saeed Aghakhani | 2014 |
| 2013 | Hussein Who Said No | Ahmad Reza Darvish | Not allowed to release |
| 2012 | Mr A | Ali Atshani | 2013 |
| 2010 | Last Theft | Pedram Alizadeh | 2010 |
| 2010 | Devil's Strait | Hamid Bahmani | - |
| 2010 | Whatever God Wants | Navid Mehmandoust | - |
| 2009 | Ungrateful | Hasan Hedayat | - |
| 2009 | Red Light | Ali Ghaffari | - |
| 2009 | Milk & Honey | Arash Moayerian | 2009 |
| 2009 | In Pursuit of Happiness | Bahman Goudarzi | Not released |
| 2008 | Anahita | Azizollah Hamidnejad | - |
| 2008 | Khatereh | Nader Tarighat | - |
| 2008 | Hurt | Mohammadreza Rahmani | - |
| 2008 | Movement | Farhad Najafi | Not released |
| 2008 | Carat 14 | Parviz Shahbazi | 2009 |
| 2007 | The Third Day | Mohammad Hossein Latifi | - |
| 2006 | Tough Boys | Majid Gharizadeh | - |
| 2006 | Difficulties of the Maiden | Masoud Atyabi | - |
| 2006 | Guest | Saeed Asadi | - |
| 2005 | Crimes & Sins | Hamidreza Mohseni | Not released |

=== TV Series ===
| Year | Film's name | Director |
|---|---|---|
| 2020 | Tweezers | Hossein Tabrizi |
| 2019 | Il da | Rama Ghavidel |
| 2018 | Recovery | Bahador Asadi |
| 2017 | Forgotten | Bahram Bahramian |
| 2017 | Pixel | Mohammad Hossein Latifi |
| 2016 | Happiness Border | Hossein Soheilizadeh |
| 2016 | The Brother | Javad Afshar |
| 2015 | Standard Patient | Saeed Aghakhani |
| 2010-15 | Kimia | Javad Afshar |
| 2014 | Persian Dinner | Soroush Sehhat |
| 2012 | Eve's Girls | Hossein Soheilizadeh |
| 2012 | Matador | Farhad Najafi |
| 2012 | The Silver Man | Kazem Masoumi |
| 2011 | Detour | Behrang Tofighi |
| 2011 | Free Fall | Alireza Amini |
| 2010 | Capital | Siroos Moghaddam |
| 2010 | The Redemption | Siroos Moghaddam |
| 2008 | Regret Day | Siroos Moghaddam |
| 2007 | Shokraneh | Saeed Soltani |
| 2007 | Sand Watch | Bahram Bahramian |
| 2006 | Sahebdelan | Mohammad Hossein Latifi |
| 2005 | Passenger | Mohammad Dastgerdi |
| 2006 | Vafa | Mohammad Hossein Latifi |
| 2004 | Great Escape | Mohammad Hossein Latifi |
| 2002 | Memorable Days | |

=== Theater ===
- Lucky Comedy (in Sydney, Brisbane, Melbourne, Perth )
- Alfred

== See also ==
- Cinema of Iran
