= Peace, Nonviolence and Empowerment - Gandhian Philosophy in the 21st Century =

Peace, Nonviolence and Empowerment - Gandhian Philosophy in the 21st Century was a conference held in New Delhi 29–30 January 2007. The conference was held to commemorate the centenary of Mohandas Gandhi's satyagraha movement. It was organized by the Indian National Congress. 122 organizations from 90 countries participated in the conference. A number of Nobel Prize laureates attended the event, including Desmond Tutu, Lech Wałęsa and Professor Muhammad Yunus. Nelson Mandela addressed the meeting via satellite link.

Congress President Sonia Gandhi attended all four panel sessions of the conference. The conference appealed to the United Nations to declare Gandhi's birthday (2 October) as the International Day of Non-Violence. Subsequently, on 15 June 2007, the United Nations General Assembly unanimously adopted 2 October as International Day of Non-Violence, a motion tabled by the Indian Minister of State for External Affairs Anand Sharma. The conference appealed to create an international civil society forum to institutionalize Gandhian approach of non-violence.

Domestically, the conference received criticism for being used to promote the political ascendancy of Rahul Gandhi. However, Rahul Gandhi held a fairly low profile at the event.

== Participants ==
The following people (among other people not listed in the following list) attended this conference:

- (Australia) David Holly
- (Bhutan) Lyonpo Khandu Wangchuk
- (Brazil) Marta Suplicy
- (China) Liu Hongcai
- (Ethiopia) Abune Paulos
- (Ethiopia) Berhanu Adello
- (Ethiopia) Gerima W. Kirkos
- (Fiji) Shaista Shameem
- (Finland) Jan-Erik Enestam
- (France) Philippe Humbert
- (Georgia (country)) George Khutsishvili
- (Germany) Sebastian Edathy
- (Germany) Christian Bartolf
- (Germany) Willy Wimmer
- (Ghana) Asiedu Nketia
- (Ghana) Adams Iddie Kofi
- (Ghana) Barbara Serwaa Asamoah
- (Ghana) Shirley A. Botchwey
- (Greece) George Papandreou
- (Greece) Tzannis Tzannetakis
- (Greece) Katerina Georgopoulou
- (Greece) Lia Papafilippou
- (Greece) Paulina Lampsa
- (India) Radha Kumar
- (Indonesia) Jusuf Kalla
- (Italy) Francesco Rutelli
- (Maldives) Maumoon Abdul Gayoom
- (Poland) Pawel Zalewski
- (Slovenia) Janez Drnovsek
- (South Africa) Ahmed Kathrada
