= Khudsiani =

Khudsiani (Persian: خودسیانی) is a surname used by Fereydani Georgians from Iran. It is related to the Caucasian Georgian surname Khutsishvili, "which may be derived from Khutsesi (priest) and mean son of a priest". Notable people with the surname include:

- Ali Khudsiani, Iranian Georgian screenwriter and director
- Karim Khudsiani, Iranian Georgian screenwriter, television presenter and actor
