= Hashtag khaleh sooskeh =

Iranian fantasy and musical television series

- Written by: Karim Khudsiani
- Directed by: Mohammad Moslemi
- Starring: Bahareh Kian Afshar; Amir Hossein Rostami; Arzhang Amirfazli; Leila Bolukat; Nilofar Rajaeifar; Elham Hamidi; Saeed Amirsoleimani; Elnaz Habibi; Sirous Hosseinifar; Hossein Rahmani Manesh; Laleh Sabouri
- Music by: Abed Atashani
- Country of origin: Iran
- Original language: Persian
- No. of seasons: 1

Production
- Producer: Hassan Mostafavi
- Running time: 40–50 minutes

Original release
- Release: 1 April 2017 – present

Hashtag Khaleh Sooskeh (Persian: هشتگ خاله سوسکه) is an Iranian fantasy and musical television series directed by Mohammad Moslemi and produced by Hassan Mostafavi. It has been produced in 15 episodes and aired on the Home Theater Network since February 2018.

== Plot ==
The City of Legends is repeated by the great demon under a spell. Meanwhile, on the night of the eleventh, Shahrzad the storyteller has arrived in the morning and the wedding celebration of Aunt Suske and Agha Moshe is to be held by the order of the great ruler; But it does not bring happiness…. The story of the film ended in a way that strengthens the continuity of this series and the possibility of making a second season

== Cast ==
- Bahareh Kian Afshar
- Amir Hossein Rostami
- Arzhang Amirfazli
- Leila Bolukat
- Nilofar Rajaeifar
- Elham Hamidi
- Saeed Amirsoleimani
- Elnaz Habibi
- Sirous Hosseinifar
- Hossein Rahmani Manesh
- Laleh Sabouri
