= Khutsishvili =

Khutsishvili is a Georgian surname. It may refer to

- Davit Khutsishvili (born 1990), Georgian freestyle wrestler
- George Khutsishvili (1948–2013), Georgian public figure
- Mikheil Khutsishvili (born 1979), Georgian football striker
- Vazha Khutsishvili (born 1992), Georgian rugby union player
- Jemal Nikolajewitsh Khutsisvili (born 1938), Georgian painter

== See also ==
- Khudsiani
