= Foggy Tabriz (TV series) =

- Written by: Mohammad-Reza Varzi
- Directed by: Mohammad-Reza Varzi
- Starring: Kourosh Tahami; Jamshid Mashayekhi; Mohamad Motie; Mohammad-Reza Sharifinia; Hesam Navabsafavi; Elham Hamidi; Daryoush Kardan; Saeed Amirsoleimani; Valiollah Momeni; Faghiheh Soltani; Sepand Amirsoleimani; Rozita Ghafari; Arzhang Amirfazli; Reza Fayazi; Javad Hashemi; Kamand Amirsoleimani; Saghar Azizi
- Composer: Babak Zarrin
- Country of origin: Iran
- Original language: Persian
- No. of seasons: 1
- No. of episodes: 28

Production
- Producer: Ali Ladoni
- Cinematography: Farshad Khaleqi
- Editor: Yalda Jabali
- Camera setup: Multi-camera
- Running time: 44 minutes

Original release
- Network: iFilm
- Release: September 9, 2010 – 2010

Foggy Tabriz (Persian: تبریز در مه, romanized: Tabriz Dar Meh; also known as Tabriz in Fog) is an Iranian historical drama television series directed by Mohammad-Reza Varzi. It ran for one season with 28 episodes. It was one of the first flagship series to air on iFilm.

It stars an ensemble cast consisting of twelve actors and actresses: Kourosh Tahami, Jamshid Mashayekhi, Mohamad Motie, Mohammad-Reza Sharifinia, Hesam Navabsafavi, Elham Hamidi, Daryoush Kardan, Valiollah Momeni, Rozita Ghaffari, Arzhang Amirfazli, Javad Hashemi, and Kamand Amir Soleymani.

== Premise ==
The series is set in the 19th century during the Russo-Persian Wars and shown from the perspective of the Iranians. The imperial powers of Europe are immersed in colonial wars and Iran is caught in the middle. French and English forces attempt to gain control over Fath-Ali Shah Qajar, the king, who is more concerned with the pleasures of daily life in his palace than with the well-being of his country. Meanwhile, the crown prince Abbas Mirza fights to keep Russian invaders from attacking Iran.
