= Majid Akhshabi =

Iranian pop singer

Majid Akhshabi مجید اخشابی
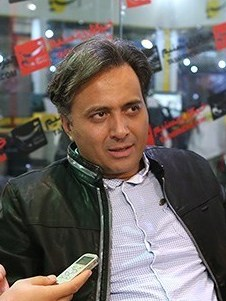

Background information
- Born: January 16, 1973 (age 53); Tehran, Iran
- Occupations: Songwriter; Singer
- Website: majidakhshabi.com
- Musical career
- Genres: Persian Pop
- Instruments: Vocals; Santur
- Years active: 2003–present
- Labels: Soroush Multimedia Inc, Hamavaz Ahang

Majid Akhshabi (Persian: مجید اخشابی, born January 16, 1973) is an Iranian Santurplayer and Persian pop singer. Majid Akhshabi became known in 2001 for singing in the credits of the TV series Lost. Akhshabi performed songs for the credits of several television series and programs, including Hamraz, Aruj, Mehtab, Mahaley-e Bande Nawaz, Yek Vajab Khaak, Khaneh Be Doosh, and The Accused Escaped.

Majid Akhshabi was one of the hit judges of the 38th Fajr International Music Festival.

== Discography ==
=== Studio albums ===
- Gomgashteh (The Lost) , 2003 Hamavaz Ahang
- Hamraaz, 2005 Hamavaz Ahang
- Parizad (Iranian Pop Music), 2006 Soroush Multimedia Inc

== See also ==
- Mohammad Esfahani
- Ali Reza Eftekhari
- Iranian pop music
