= The Accused Escaped =

Iranian television series

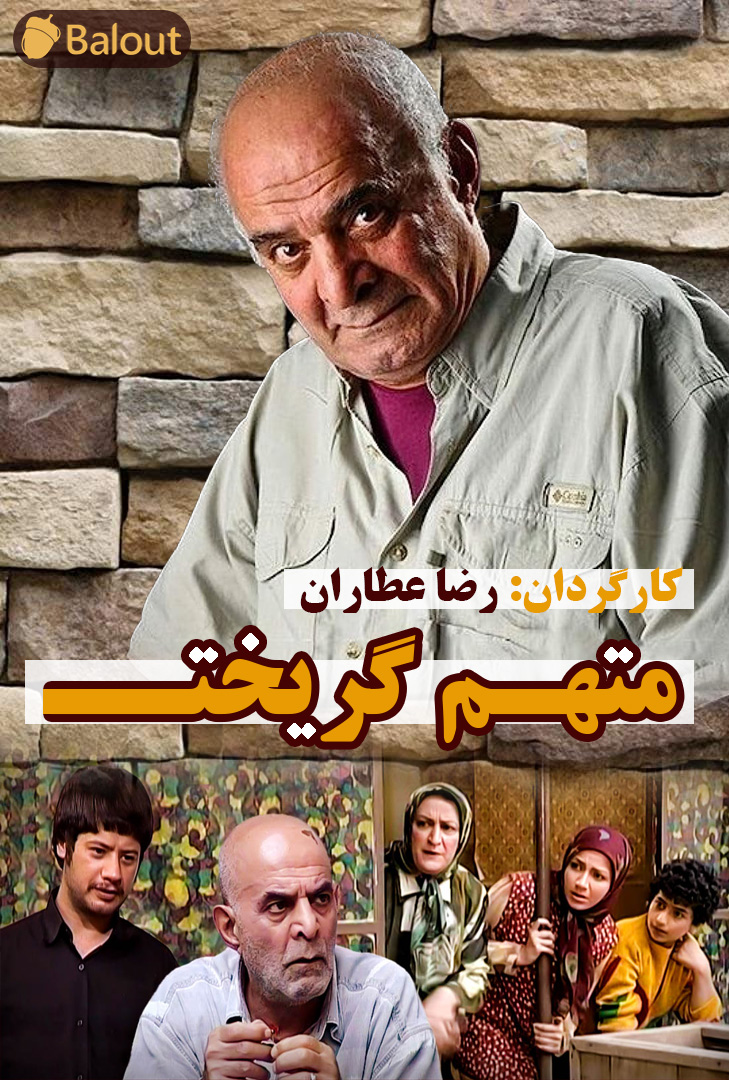
- متهم گریخت
- Genre: Comedy drama
- Written by: Saeed Aghakhani
- Directed by: Reza Attaran
- Starring: Sirus Gorjestani; Maryam Amir Jalali; Ali Sadeghi; Saeed Aghakhani; Mahmoud Bahrami; Shahrbanoo Mousavi; Melika Zarei; Lida Fatholahi; Alireza Jafari; Reza Attaran; Ahmad Pourmokhber; Khashayar Rad; Flor Nazari; Majid Shahriari
- Opening theme: "The Accused Escaped" by Reza Attaran & Amirhossein Modares
- Ending theme: by Majid Akhshabi
- Composers: Hamid Reza Sadri & Alireza Afkari
- Country of origin: Iran
- Original language: Persian
- No. of seasons: 1
- No. of episodes: 26

Production
- Producers: Mehran Maham; Vahid Ghotbizadeh
- Production location: Tehran
- Running time: 45 minutes

Original release
- Release: 3 October – 4 November 2005

The Accused Escaped (Persian: متهم گریخت, romanized: Motaham Gorikht) is an Iranian comedy-drama television series directed by Reza Attaran and written by Saeed Aghakhani, which aired on IRIB TV3 from 3 October to 4 November 2005 for 26 episodes. The series centers on Hashem, who migrates to Tehran with his family because of his heart problem, his wife's insistence, and the hope of a better job, but living in Tehran puts him and his family in a lot of trouble.

In April 2021, after 15 years of the series airing, IRIB TV3 broadcast it again and it was one of the most-watched television series of the year, becoming one of the most popular television series of all time in Iran.

== Synopsis ==
Hashem (Sirus Gorjestani) and his family live a simple life in a city not far away. Prior to his illness, he worked as an exhaust repairman in a rented shop, but doctors prevented him from doing heavy work due to his illness. For this reason, they decide to move to Tehran. Upon arrival in Tehran, Hashem and his family face many problems that...

== Cast and characters ==
=== Main ===
- Sirus Gorjestani as Hashem Agha Babazadeh
- Maryam Amir Jalali as Sarvar Khanoom, Hashem wife
- Ali Sadeghi as Abbas, Masoumeh husband and Hashem's son-in-law
- Saeed Aghakhani as Mansour, in love with Azam
- Mahmoud Bahrami as Shazdeh, Hashem Landlord, in love with Bibi
- Shahrbanoo Mousavi as Bibi, Hashem mom, Sarvar Mother-in-law
- Melika Zarei as Masoumeh, Hashem youngest daughter and Abbas Wife
- Lida Fatholahi as Azam, Hashem eldest daughter
- Alireza Jafari as Saeed, Hashem son

=== Recurring ===
- Reza Attaran as Ramin
- Ahmad Pourmokhber as Mashghorboun, Hashem Neighbor, in love with Bibi
- Majid Shahriari as Ashki, Hashem boss and creditor
- Khashayar Rad as Nader Blourian
- Felor Nazari as Nader wife
- Reza Davood Nejad as the man in front of the Hospital
- Asghar Heidari as Touraj, Criminal and Hashem Classmate
- Anahita Afshar as Ramin wife
- Mohammad Barsouzian as the head of the Hospital
- Afshin Sangchap as the driver that Saeed Brought

== Controversy ==
=== Ambiguities about the writer of the series ===
In one of the episodes of the Haft TV program, it was said that the is script of the TV series "Khaneh be Dosh" and the plot of the TV series "The Accused Escaped" from Asghar Farhadi. In a program on Channel Shoma, Maryam Amir Jalali raised this issue again and said that the main writer of this series and the series "Khaneh be Dosh" was Asghar Farhadi, but at that time, because he wanted to be mentioned only in cinematic works, He preferred not to have his name in the serial titration! Shortly afterwards, Saeed Aghakhani announced on the same program on Channel Shoma that the writers of both series are the same ones whose names are mentioned in the credits and that Ms. Amir Jalali spoke because of her lack of nobility in the whole subject.

== Reception ==
=== Awards and nominations ===
Year	Award	Category	Recipient	Result
2006	9th Hafez Awards	Best Television Series	The Accused Escaped	Nominated
2006	9th Hafez Awards	Best Director – Television Series	Reza Attaran	Won
2006	9th Hafez Awards	Best Actor – Television Series Comedy	Sirus Gorjestani	Nominated
2006	9th Hafez Awards	Best Actress – Television Series Comedy	Maryam Amir Jalali	Nominated
2006	9th Hafez Awards	Best Original Song	Reza Attaran, Amir Hossein Modares	Nominated
2006	9th Hafez Awards	Best Original Song	Majid Akhshabi	Nominated
