= Noon Khe =

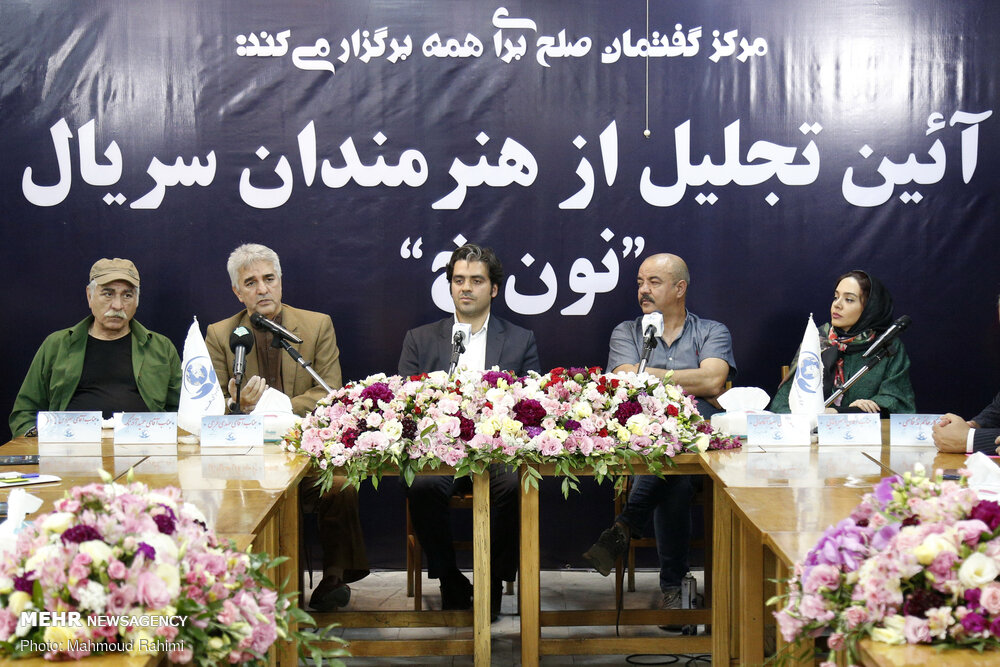
- Written by: Amir Vafaee
- Directed by: Saeed Aghakhani
- Starring: Saeed Aghakhani (Seasons 1,2,3); Hamid Reza Azarang (Seasons 1,2); Ali Sadeghi (Season 1,3); Sirus Meimanat; Hooman Haji Abdollahi (Season 1); Faride Sepahmansour (Season 1); Naeimeh Nezamdoost (Season 1); Sirus Hosseinifar
- Music by: Sadegh Azmand
- Country of origin: Iran
- Original language: Persian
- No. of seasons: 5
- No. of episodes: First season: 15 episodes, second season: 14 episodes, third season: 16 episodes, fourth season: 30 episodes

Production
- Producer: Mehdi Faraji
- Cinematography: Amir Maghouli
- Running time: 40–50 minutes
- Production company: IRIB

Original release
- Network: IRIB TV1
- Release: 1 April 2019 – present

Noon Khe (Persian: نون خ) is an Iranian comedy TV series portraying the life of a Kurdish family. It ran for 5 seasons and ninety over the course of 6 years (2018–2024) premiering during each Nowruz, the Iranian New Year, with the exception of second season that began in the Ramazan of 2020. The comedy series is written by Amir Vafaee, and directed by Saeed Aghakhani who is also the main character in the series.

== Plot ==
This series has a social story mixed with humor. Noureddin Khanzadeh (Saeed Agakhani) owns a workshop for processing sunflower seeds. Local farmers in Noureddine have sold their sunflower seeds to Noureddine. Noureddine sold this product to a person living in Tehran named Mirzaei, so that he could sell these products in Turkey. Meanwhile, it is reported that Mirzaei has died, and the farmers who learn of this news are somehow trying to extort money from him for the products they sold to Noureddin Khanzadeh. During various conversations with Mirzaei's entourage, Noureddine also realizes that he was not in the middle of his life. The continuation of this story takes place in the second season of the series.

== Cast ==
- Saeed Aghakhani Nooreddin Khanzadeh (Seasons 1,2,3,4)
- Hamid Reza Azarang Khalil Khanzade (Seasons 1,2,4)
- Ali Sadeghi Sirous (Season 1,3)
- Sirous Meimanat Keivan (Season 1,2,3,4)
- Hediyeh Bazvand Rojan Khanzadeh
- Neda Ghasemi Shirin Khanzade
- Hooman Haji Abdollahi (Season 1,4)
- Faride Sepahmansour faride (Season 1)
- Naeimeh Nezamdoost behnosh (Season 1)
- Bijan Banafshekhah (Season 4)
