= Maryam Amir Jalali =

Iranian actress (born 1957)

- مريم امیرجلالی
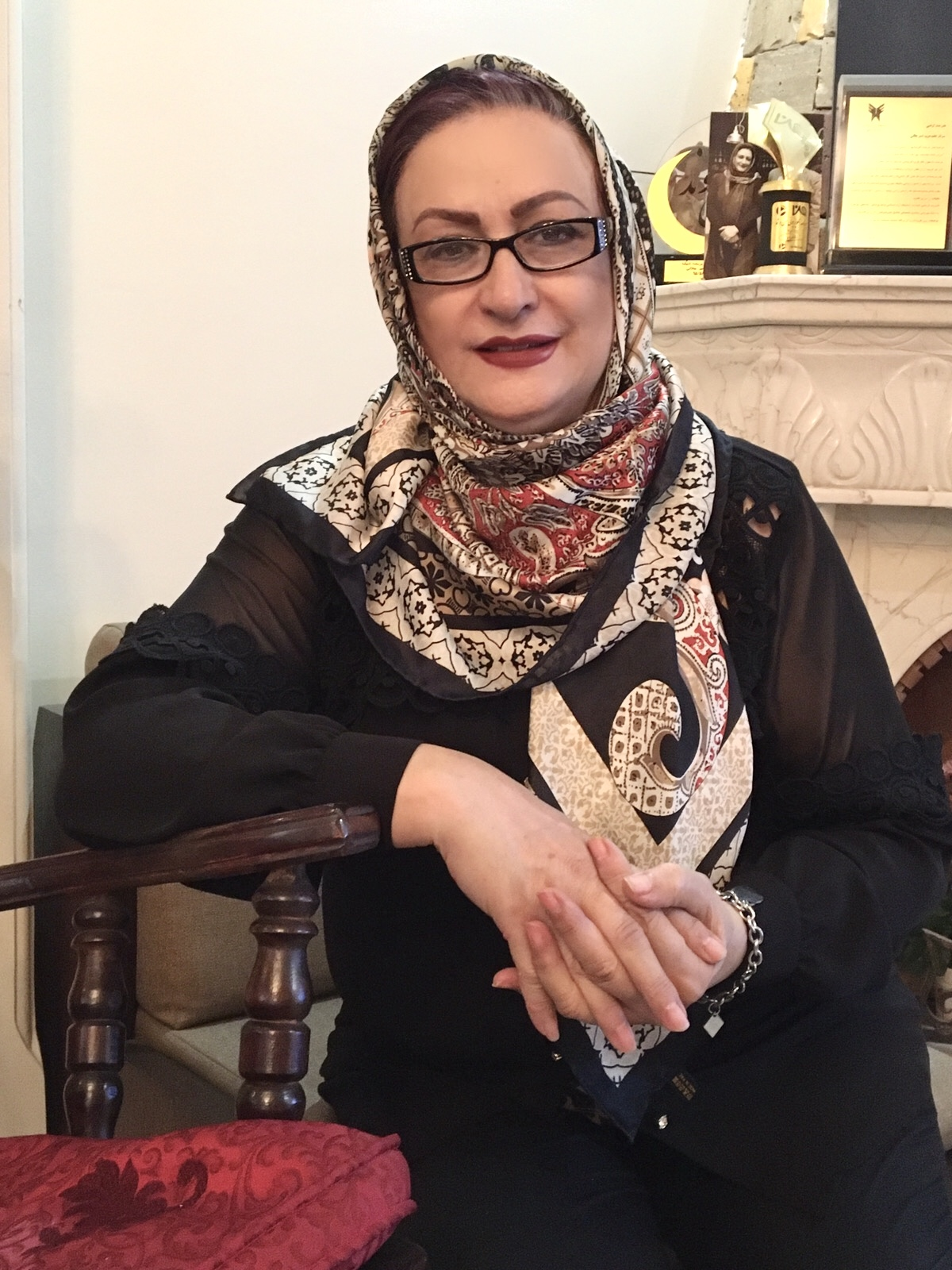
- Amir Jalali in 2020
- Born: December 21, 1947 (age 78); Tehran, Iran
- Occupation: Actress
- Years active: 1999–present

Maryam Amir Jalali (Persian: مريم امیرجلالی; December 21, 1947) is an Iranian actress. She won a Hafez Award for her acting in Sour and Sweet (2006)

== Career ==
Maryam Amir Jalali, a cinema and television actress, is best known for her roles in comedy series.

Beginning her professional career as an actress in 1999, she appeared in a number of dramas since then.

Amir Jalali has played roles in movies, such as 'Tehran Nights' (2000), 'Sweet Jam' (2001), 'Daybreak' (2005), 'Hello Mother-in-Law' (2006), 'Red Light' (2009), 'The Extremists' (2009), 'Looking For Happiness' (2009) and 'How I Became a Billionaire' (2010).

Her best-known series include 'Under the Indigo Dome' (1995), 'Hotel' (1998-1999), 'The Story of a City 2' (2000), 'The Entrance Exam' (2002), 'The New Bride' (2002), 'Homeless' (2004), 'The Way of Infatuation' (2004), 'The Suspect Got Away' (2005), 'Sweet and Sour' (2006), 'Checkered' (2007), 'Four Wheels' (2011), 'Family Conspiracy' (2011), 'A Girl Named Ahoo' (2011), 'Restless' (2013) and 'Bad Days Pass' (2013).

== Filmography ==
=== TV shows ===
Title	Year	Director	Character	Genre
Khane Be Doosh	2004	Reza Attaran	Nahid	Comedy
Poshte Konkoriha	2004			Comedy
The Accused Escaped	2005	Reza Attaran	Sarvar	Comedy
Torsh va Shirin	2007	Reza Attaran		Comedy
Char Khooneh	2007–2008	Soroush Sehhat	Shokouh Jamali	Comedy
Talagh Dar Vaghte Ezafeh	2009	Seyed Mohsen Yousefi		Comedy

=== Movies ===
Title	Year	Director	Character	Genre
Shabhaye Tehran (Nights of Tehran)	2001	Dariush Farhang		
Morabaye Shirin (Sweet Jam)	2001	Marziyeh Boroomand		
Dam E Sobh – Day Break	2005			
Nesf Male Man, Nesf Male To	2007	Vahid Nik'khah Azad		Comedy
Madar Zan Salam	2008	Khosro Malakan		Comedy
EfratiHa	2010	Jahangir Jahangiri		Comedy
Hereditary Villa	2024	Nima Hashemi		Comedy
