= Elham Hamidi =

Iranian actress (born 1977)

- الهام حمیدی
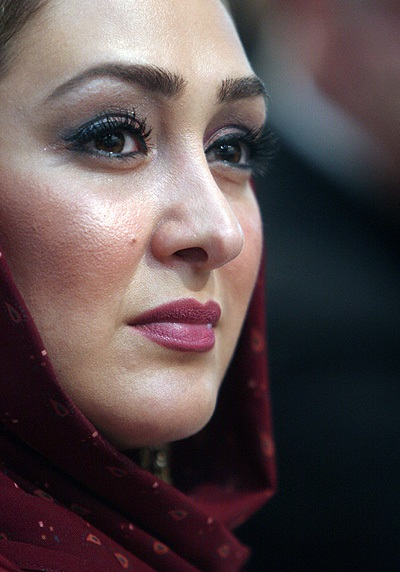
- Born: November 29, 1977 (age 48); Tehran, Iran
- Occupation: Actress
- Years active: 2003–present

Elham Hamidi (Persian: الهام حمیدی, also Romanized as "Elhām Hamīdī"; born November 29, 1977) is an Iranian actress. She has appeared in the mini-series Prophet Joseph as Asinaat. She also starred in The Kingdom of Solomon as Mariyam.

== Early life ==
Elham Hamidi is an accounting graduate student from "Roudehen University". She has two elder brothers, and she is married. Elham participated in school plays from the age of seven because it was her family occupation. Her father was also an actor and he was much active in theater, this developed an interest in Elham to join this field like her father. Elham is well known for her series "Pervaneh", "Musafir az Hind" (Passenger from India), Prophet Joseph, and The Kingdom of Solomon. Elham won the best actress award for her performance in "Kheili dour, Kheili Nazdik" ( So close, so far).

== Filmography ==
Year	Title	Director	Role
2001	Traveler from India	Ghasem Jafari	Parvaneh
2002	Donya	Manochehr Maseri	
2002	Teek	Esmaeil Fallahpour	
2003	Waa Da'ye Deedaar	Jamal Shoorje	
2004	So Close, So Far	Reza Mirkarimi	
2005	Shahre Ashoob (City of Chaos)	Yadullah Samdi	
2005	Sargijeh (Vertigo)	Mohammad Zarindast	
2006	Bachehaye Abadi (Eternal Kids)	Pooran Derakshandeh	Negar
2006	Zire Tigh (TV Series)	Mohammad-Reza Honarmand	
2007	Mahya	Akbar Khuajoye	
2008	Prophet Joseph	Farajullah Salahshur	Bano Asenath
2008	Deldadeh	Qudratullah Salahmirzae	
2008	Akharin Davat	Hossein Sahelizadeh	
2009	Seh Darajeh Tab	Hamid Reza Salahmand	
2010	The Kingdom of Solomon	Shehryar Behrani	Maryam
2010	Mokhtarnameh	Dawood Mir Baaqri	Shereen Bano
2010	Tabriz Dar Meh	Mohammad Reza Varzi	
2011	Shoghe Parvaz (Flying Passion)	Yadullah Samdi	Maliha
2011	Akhlagheto Khob Kon	Masoud Atyabi	
2011	Moj va Sakhreh	Majid Salehi	
2012	Rahe Behesht (Way of Heaven)	Mehdi Sabaghazadeh	
2012	Raze Penhan	Floura Sam	
2013	Gahvarehei Baraye Madar (A Cradle for Mother)	Panah Barkhuda Razaei	Narges
	Inja Iran	Hassan Nazir	
2014	Sarzamine Koohan	Kamal Tabrizi	
2014	Roozhaye Bigharari	Kazem Masoumi	Raha
2016	Ma hameh gonahkarim	Hassan Nazer	Sara
2017	Hashtag khaleh sooskeh (TV series)	Mohammad Moslemi	
2018	Roozhaye Bigharari 2	Kazem Masoumi	Raha
2022	Killing a Traitor	Masoud Kimiai	

== Marriage ==
She married Alireza Sadeghi in February 2019.
