= Acacia Alley =

- کوچه اقاقیا
- Genre: Drama; Comedy
- Written by: Reza Attaran; Soroush Sehhat; Ali Reza Masoudi
- Directed by: Reza Attaran
- Starring: Manoochehr Nozari; Bagher Sahraroodi; Alireza Jafari; Ali Sadeghi; Reza Attaran; Afshin Sangchap; Reza Shafiei Jam; Majid Salehi; Shaghayegh Dehghan; Zohreh Mojabi; Aref Lorestani; Katayun Amir Ebrahimi
- Composer: Hamid Reza Sadri
- Country of origin: Iran
- Original language: Persian
- No. of seasons: 1
- No. of episodes: 84

Production
- Producer: Homayoun Izadpanah
- Production location: Tehran
- Cinematography: Zinaldin Allameh
- Editor: Ali Eshtiagh
- Running time: 25 - 30 minutes

Original release
- Release: 12 October 2003 – 6 February 2004

Acacia Alley (Persian: کوچه اقاقیا; Kocheh Aghaghia) is an Iranian Drama and Comedy series. The series is directed by Reza Attaran.

== Storyline ==
The series is about an old man who lives in his old house. His wife Golnesa died a few years ago, But he has been dreaming of her for some time and he talks to her about different issues. These dreams cause her children to worry about their father's health and to gather together in their father's house. Their presence together, creates humorous adventures...

== Cast ==
- Manoochehr Nozari
- Bagher Sahraroodi
- Alireza Jafari
- Ali Sadeghi
- Reza Attaran
- Afshin Sangchap
- Reza Shafiei Jam
- Majid Salehi
- Shaghayegh Dehghan
- Zohreh Mojabi
- Aref Lorestani
- Katayun Amir Ebrahimi
- Yousef Teymouri
- Shahab Asgari
- Roshanak Ajamian
- Akbar Doodkar
- Saeed Nourollahi
- Khashayar Rad
- Zohreh Mojabi
- Saghi Zinati
- Mohammad Reza Haghgoo
- Yousef Pashandi
- Saman Golriz
- Hossein Shahab
- Koorosh Masoumi
- Fatemeh Daneshzad
