= Rabeh Oskouie =

Iranian actress

Rabeh Oskouie رابعه اسکویی
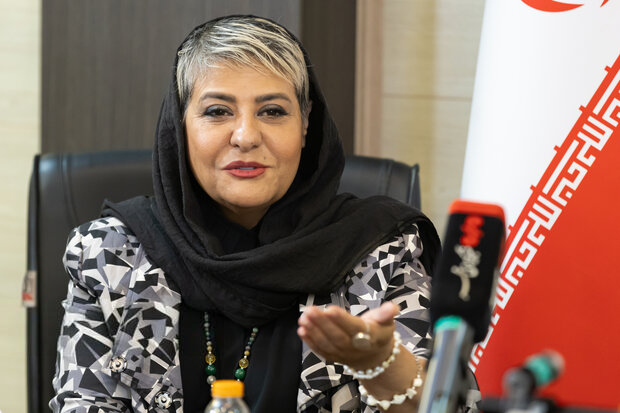
- Born: 8 June 1966 (age 59); Tehran, Iran
- Occupations: Theatre, Television and film actress
- Years active: 1994–present

Rabeh Oskouie (Persian: رابعه اسکویی) is an Iranian film and Television actress. She started theater training under the supervision of Iranian theater director Hamid Samandarian.

== Rabee Oskooi’s Acting Career ==
Rabee Oskooi trained in acting under the guidance of Hamid Samandarian. She was also briefly active with the GEM TV satellite network.

== Migration and Role in GEM TV ==
On January 3, 2016, following the moves of actors such as Chakameh Chamanmah, Sadaf Taherian, and Mani Kasraian to GEM TV, Rabee Oskooi joined the satellite network to participate in a video production. She discussed her motivations for leaving Iran during GEM TV’s Nowruz special program in 2016.

== Return to Iran ==
After two years abroad and her work with GEM TV, Oskooi decided to return to Iran on January 24, 2018. Expressing joy upon her return, she cited the lack of support for artists in Iran and personal reasons for her initial decision to leave. She also mentioned health issues and a strong attachment to her homeland as primary reasons for coming back, a return warmly welcomed by fellow actors.

== Personal Remarks ==
In one of her interviews, Oskooi denied rumors of marriage to Maziyar Lorestanian, clarifying that her 30-year friendship with him ended for personal reasons.

On 3 February 2026, Oskooi took to her Instagram to offer condolences and an apology to the public for the government's handling of the 2025–2026 Iranian protests.

== Filmography ==
- 2020 - Tweezers (TV series)
- 2019 – Gando (TV series)
- 2014 – I'm just kidding (TV series)
- 2012 – Bidar Bash (TV Series)
- 2011 – Facing Mirrors as Nurse
- 2011 – Crime and Punishment (TV movie)
- 2010 – Poopak and Mash Mashallah
- 2008 – Shirin as herself
- 2006 – Left Handed
- 2001 – Killing Mad Dogs
- 1999 – Once Upon a Time
- 1998 – Divorce Iranian Style
- 1994 – Excuse me (TV Series)

== Awards ==
- Nominated for the Crystal Simorgh for Best Supporting Actress at the 19th Fajr International Film Festival for Killing Dogs (2000).
