= The Third Day (2007 film) =

- روز سوم
- Directed by: Mohammad Hossein Latifi
- Based on: documentary by Hamid Zargarnejad
- Produced by: Alireza Jalali Hamid Akhoondi
- Starring: Pouria Poursorkh Baran Kosari Hamed Behdad
- Release date: 2007
- Running time: 90 minutes
- Country: Iran
- Language: Persian

The Third Day (Persian: روز سوم, romanized: Rooz-e-Sevom) is the sixth film of Mohammad Hossein Latifi as a director and produced in 2007. This film is based on the documentary of the same name by Hamid Zargarnejad.The film stars Pouria Poursorkh, Baran Kosari and Hamed Behdad. The film shows the last days of battle of Khorramshahr.

== Plot ==
During the Iran-Iraq War, a disabled young woman is taken captive by Iraqi Baathist forces in Khuzestan Province (in southern Iran). Her brother, along with his fellow combatants, tries to free his sister from the clutches of the enemy.

== Awards ==
- Statue of the best field special effects of the 11th Cinema House Festival in 2008
- Crystal Simorgh is the best film of the 25th Fajr International Film Festival, 2007
- Crystal Simorgh Best Director of the 25th Fajr International Film Festival 2007
- Crystal Simorgh Best Actress in a Leading Role at the 25th Fajr International Film Festival 2007
