= Deldadeh =

- Persian: دلداده
- Directed by: Ghodratollah Solh-Mirzaei
- Written by: Godratollah Solh-Mirzaei; Ruhollah Baradari
- Produced by: Kamal Tabatabaei
- Starring: Majid Salehi; Javad Razavian; Akbar Abdi; Elham Hamidi; Sahar Zakaria; Ahmad Pourmokhber; Yousef Sayadi
- Cinematography: Faraj Heidari
- Edited by: Arash Moayerian
- Distributed by: TDH Home Entertainment
- Release date: November 19, 2008
- Running time: 85 minutes
- Country: Iran
- Language: Persian

Deldadeh (Persian: دلداده); (English: Lover) is a 2008 Iranian romantic comedy film drirected by Ghodratollah Solh-Mirzaei.

== Plot ==
It is about a rich girl who returns to Iran after years to get married and several men try to marry her for her wealth. Because of the impaired phone lines, everyone in the building finds out about the arrival of Asal Irani from the US. Asal had a rich father who has died and according to the will, she must marry an Iranian man in order to inherit the fortune. As Ahoo, Asal's sister, and Ganari, her grandmother, exit the building, they face all of the residents outside and they all go to the airport, leaving Karim, an electrical engineer, behind. Karim tells his friend, Javad, a musician and singer, about Asal; but Javad has no interest in her. Karim gets away from Naser, Asal's maternal uncle and who hates Karim because of his debts and failed promises, steals Javad's bicycle and rushes to the airport. A girl enters Javad's apartment and they end up disliking each other. The girl is revealed to be Asal, being welcomed by her family and neighbors warmly. Karim returns and Javad explains what happened while Asal says how she was treated by Javad, who Ganari supports a lot. Karim goes to the Irani apartment to introduce himself, where Shapour, another man enters and does the same, and both are expelled by Naser, who calls his associate, Parviz, and tells him to come and suit Asal that night before anyone else does. Ganari calls Javad and tells him to come and apologize to Asal. Parviz arrives; but Karim takes his suiting stuff and guides him to the wrong apartment. Before Javad can make any apology, he has his back burnt. Naser tells Parviz to prepare to suit Asal the next night. Karim tries another meeting with Asal, which is interrupted by Naser, who tells him that he must marry Ahoo as he promised. Karim vows not to let Parviz suit Asal.

The next morning, Helen, Javad's agent pays a visit to him, but Karim ruins it and Javad gets angry. Karim unites the building boys against Naser's plan. Gahraman, Parviz's uncle arrives before the latter, with his own plan to suit Ganari. Parviz arrives; but is again guided to another apartment, where he drinks a juice containing psychoactive substance, made by Karim's team. Parviz enters the Irani apartment in a psychotic manner, bringing shame for Naser. Gahraman throws Karim's team in the pool as payback and takes Parviz to the hospital. Javad has a play in the yard and impresses Asal.

Asal and Ahoo inform Javad and Karim that they plan to hold a party and want to go shopping by their old car, which isn't working. Karim tries to repair it in order to impress Asal; but Javad manages to do it. The four go shopping and Asal begins to dislike Karim while falling in love with Javad. At the party, Gahraman suits Ganari and Parviz tries to suit Helen; but she ignores him. Karim gets angry with Javad for ruining his plan to impress Asal.

Javad surprisingly suits Asal for Karim, making Ahoo angry. Javad tells Asal that Karim really loves her. More surprisingly, she accepts, making Naser so angry that he leaves. They go to the marriage office, where Karim reveals that he only wants Asal so that he can go to the US and live comfortably and she reveals that she never intended to marry him and she only wanted Javad to know who Karim is. Gahraman and Ganari use this chance to get married instead. Karim and Javad try to apologize to Ahoo and Asal, respectively; but the sisters leave angrily. Javad and Karim steal Shapur's car and flee. Naser gets angry when he hears that Gahraman has married his mother. Gahraman and Ganari take Ahoo and Asal on their honeymoon. Karim gets their whereabouts from Gahraman. The former and Javad arrive and successfully reconcile with the sisters. The three couples travel to honeymoon happily.

== Cast ==
- Majid Salehi as Karim
- Javad Razavian as Javad
- Akbar Abdi as Naser
- Elham Hamidi as Asal
- Sahar Zakaria as Ahoo
- Mina Jafarzadeh as Ganari
- Ahmad Pourmokhber as Gahraman
- Yousef Sayadi as Parviz
- Ashkan Eshtiyagh
- Amir Noori
- Parvin Meykade
- Mehran Rajabi
- Majid Yaser
- Parvin Maleki
- Javad Nazari
- Mohammad Ali Dashti
