= Babak Zarrin =

Iranian composer and songwriter

Babak Zarrin بابک زرین
- Birth name: Alireza Shabani Zarrinkafsh (Persian: علیرضا شعبانی زرین‌کفش)
- Born: July 30, 1978 (age 46)
- Origin: Rasht, Iran
- Genres: Persian traditional; pop
- Occupation(s): composer, songwriter
- Years active: 2001–present

Babak Zarrin (Persian: بابک زرین, romanized: Bābak Zarrin; Persian pronunciation: [bɒːˈbæk zæɾˈɾiːn]) (born 30 July 1978) is an Iranian composer and songwriter.

== Biography ==
Alireza Shabani Zarrinkafsh was born in 1978 in the city of Rasht, Guilan province. In his adolescence, he began piano lessons with Azadeh Pourbayram and Sohrab Falakangiz, continuing to study music theory in his hometown.

He is a graduate of the Tehran Conservatory in the field of composition, counterpoint, song music, and opera singing.

Later, Zarrinkafsh became a pupil of Babak Bayat and Mohsen Elhamian. Babak Zarrinkafsh chose the artistic name "Babak Zarrin".

== Career ==
Zarrin has collaborated with renowned Iranian singers on over 20 musical albums as a songwriter, including Moein, Aref Arefkia, Salar Aghili, Mohammad Esfahani, Reza Sadeghi, Farzad Farzin, Alireza Ghorbani, Mohammad-Reza Foroutan, Ava Bahram, Mohammad Alizadeh, Hamid Hami, Mani Rahnama, Reza Bahram and Shahab Mozaffari. He has also composed several film scores and theme music for TV series and movies such as Foggy Tabriz and The Enigma of the Shah.

== Awards ==
- Best Titles Award, 16th Hafez Festival, 2016
- Special Award of "Khane-ye Taraneh", in commemoration of Afshin Yadollahi, 2017

== References and footnotes ==
- "Babak Zarrin". USA: Music Track. (Bibliography)
- "بیوگرافی بابک زرین در وبگاه موزیک ترَک". Iran: Music Track. Archived from the original on 29 December 2018. (Bibliography)
- "بابک زرین در وبگاه رسانهٔ نوا". Iran: Music Track. (Bibliography)
