= Valiollah Momeni =

Iranian actor (1943–2015)

Valiollah Momeni ولی‌الله مؤمنی
- Born: Valioallah Momeni Irdemousa; May 31, 1944; Ardabil, Iran
- Died: December 29, 2015 (aged 71); Karaj, Iran
- Occupation(s): film, TV and Theatre actor; voice actor

Valiollah Momeni (Persian: ولی‌الله مؤمنی, May 31, 1944 — December 29, 2015) was an Iranian actor and voice actor. Momeni had played in famous movies and TV series including Foggy Tabriz and Mokhtarnameh.
