= Zohreh Mojabi =

Iranian actress and playwright (born 1960)

- زهره مجابی
- Born: Zohreh Mojabi; February 14, 1960 (age 66); Qazvin, Iran
- Occupations: Actor, director, producer, author
- Years active: 1985–present
- Spouse: Reza Fieze Norouzi

Zohreh Mojabi (Persian: زهره مجابی, born 14 February 1960 in Qazvin) is an Iranian actress and playwright who has appeared in several films and TV serials.

Mojabi studied at the School of Fine Arts, University of Tehran from which she received a BA in acting and an MA from Azad University.

Mojabi's radio plays are often broadcast on IRIB.

== Filmography ==
- Naghash-e Javan (1992)
- Marde-Avazi (1998)
- Boodan ya naboodan (1999)
- Mard-e Barani (2000)
- Azizam Man Kook Nistam (2002)
- Eshgh-e Film (2003)
- Acacia Alley (2003 - 2004)
- Majnoone Leyli (2008)
- Farari (2009)
- 3 Daraje Tab (2009)
- kolah geess (2010)
