= Adam Hanieh =

British political scientist

- Born: Amman, Jordan

Academic background
- Education: York University

Academic work
- Discipline: Development studies
- Institutions: SOAS, University of London

Adam Hanieh is a development studies academic in the United Kingdom. He is professor of political economy and global development at the University of Exeter and joint chair in Middle East Studies at Tsinghua University. He was formerly Professor in Development Studies at SOAS, University of London, a founding member of the SOAS Centre for Palestine Studies, and a former member of the Council for British Research in the Levant. He is noted for his research on Marxism, the political economy of the Middle East, labour migration, class and state formation in the Gulf Cooperation Council, and Palestine studies.

From 1997 to 2003, Hanieh lived in the Palestinian Territories, where he completed an MA in Regional Studies at Al Quds University. Hanieh has a PhD in political science from York University in Canada and previously taught at Zayed University in the United Arab Emirates before joining SOAS in London.

Hanieh leads the New Regionalisms Working Group of the Arab Council for the Social Sciences.

His book, Money, Markets, and Monarchies: The Gulf Cooperation Council and the Political Economy of the Contemporary Middle East (Cambridge University Press, 2018), was awarded the 2019 International Political Economy Group Book Prize of the British International Studies Association.

== Select Bibliography ==
- Capitalism and Class in the Gulf Arab States. New York: Palgrave Macmillan, 2011. This book analyzes the recent development of Gulf capitalism through to the aftermath of the 2008 economic crisis. Situating the Gulf within the evolution of capitalism at a global scale, it presents a novel theoretical interpretation of this important region of the Middle East political economy.
- Lineages of Revolt. Issues of Contemporary Capitalism in the Middle East. Chicago, IL: Haymarket Books, 2013. This book is about origins and impact of neoliberal development in the Middle East. Case studies detail the impact of neoliberalism on deregulations, debt & loan policy, working conditions, trade and the institutional reconfiguration of the state since WWII.
- Money, Markets, and Monarchies: The Gulf Cooperation Council and the Political Economy of the Contemporary Middle East. Cambridge: Cambridge University Press, 2018.
- "The Political Economy of State Formation in Palestine." In Rethinking Statehood in Palestine: Self-Determination and Decolonization Beyond Partition, edited by Leila H. Farsakh, 29-53. Berkeley: University of California Press, 2021.
- Crude Capitalism: Oil, Corporate Power, and the Making of the World Market. London: Verso Books, 2024. This book examines the role of oil in shaping global capitalism, from the late nineteenth century to the present climate crisis.
