= The Kingdom of Solomon =

- Official poster of the English version
- Directed by: Shahriar Bahrani
- Written by: Shahriar Bahrani
- Produced by: Mojtaba Faravardeh
- Starring: Amin Zendegani; Elham Hamidi; Mahmud Pakniyat; Alireza Kamali
- Cinematography: Hamid Khozouee
- Edited by: Mohammadreza Muini
- Music by: Chan Kwong Wing
- Production company: KPS film
- Distributed by: Farabi Cinema Foundation
- Release date: 5 October 2010
- Running time: 110 minutes
- Country: Iran
- Languages: Persian; English
- Budget: $5.1 million
- Box office: $3 million

The Kingdom of Solomon (Persian: ملک سلیمان) is a 2010 Iranian religious/historical film series produced by Mojtaba Faravardeh and directed by Shahriar Bahrani who made Saint Mary a decade earlier. The Kingdom of Solomon was to be released internationally in November 2010 after its screening in Iran, but due to some technicalities its global release was delayed. The film tells the life story of Prophet Solomon, the King of Israelites. It is mostly based on the Islamic accounts of Solomon's prophetic life extracted from the Qur'an but also draws upon parallels found in some Jewish texts.

== Plot ==
Solomon is a wise prophet selected as the crown prince by his father King David (Dawud in Islamic texts) when he was 9. Following Prophet David's death, Solomon succeeds to the crown and God appoints him as a prophet. Requesting from God the establishment of a divine kingdom, Solomon takes the wind under his command and jinns and demons under his control. Inviting rulers of the neighbouring lands to the monotheistic religion, Prophet Solomon continues his divine mission in as much as Balqis, the Queen of Sheba professes monotheism. At the end, while leaning on his cane, Solomon bids farewell to the world, and the jinns and demons get out of reign and return to their own world.

=== Part one ===
Solomon, the prophet and king of Judah, asks God to grant him an ideal kingdom and a promised paradise not to be given to anyone until the end of the world. For this to be fulfilled, he should face the world of the devils (jinns and demons), their materialization, and an imminent and cruel war with them. Filled with disbelief and blasphemy, the heads of the different tribes of the Israelites reject his calls for help. When disaster strikes and the people get demonic and lunatic, barely can Solomon control the crisis. But as soon as the creatures take material form, he prays for God's help and favour to overcome their onslaught. So God helps him and the devils get scared of Prophet Solomon.

=== Part two ===
Filming of this part has not begun yet but its production and casting is under review: Solomon is announced by God in the Qur'an to have control over various elements, such as winds, to use them for different purposes including transportation. He travels to several territories and builds towers and monuments using the power of jinns. He also sets up a crystal palace in Jerusalem al-Quds. Then he meets the Queen of Sheba and, according to Islamic texts, introduces her into Islam ("submission to God").

== Cast ==
- Amin Zendegani as Solomon
- Mahmoud Pakniyat as Yazar
- Elham Hamidi as Miriam
- Hossein Mahjoub as Asif ibn Barkhiya
- Alireza Kamalinezhad as Adonijah
- Zahra Saeedi as Michal
- Mehdi Faghih as Ara
- Javad Taheri as Absalom
- Sirous Saber as Joab
- Mohammad Yaromtaghloo as jinn

== Awards ==
=== The 28th Fajr Film Festival 2010 ===
At the 28th Fajr International Film Festival, The Kingdom of Solomon was nominated for 9 Awards in the National section and won 5 Crystal Simorgh which are as follows:

- The Best Music Crystal Simorgh for Chan Kwong Wing
- The Best Visual Effects Crystal Simorgh for Leo Lo
- The Best Make up Crystal Simorgh for Saeed Malekan
- The Best Sound Mix Crystal Simorgh for Kinson Tsang
- The Best supporting Actor Crystal Simorgh for Mahdi Faghih

=== Beside Parts of Fajr International Film Festival ===
- The Golden Flag Mustafa Eghad Award
- The Festival Golden Plaque Award

=== The 14th Celebration House of Cinema 2010 ===
At the 14 Celebration House of Cinema, was nominated for 2 Awards in the National section and won 4:

- The Best Cinematography Competence Golden Statue for Hamid Khozuee Abyaneh
- The Best Cloth Design Competence Golden Statue for Hamid Ghadirian
- The Best Production Design Competence Golden Statue for Hamid Ghadirian
- The Best Visual Effects Competence Golden Statue for Leo Lo

=== The Baghdad International Film Festival 2010 ===
- The Best Director Award for Shahriar Bahrani
- The first Edition Award for Mohammadreza Muini
- The Best Film Award for Kingdom of Solomon

== See also ==
- List of Islamic films
