= Saeed Aghakhani =

Iranian actor

- سعید آقاخانی
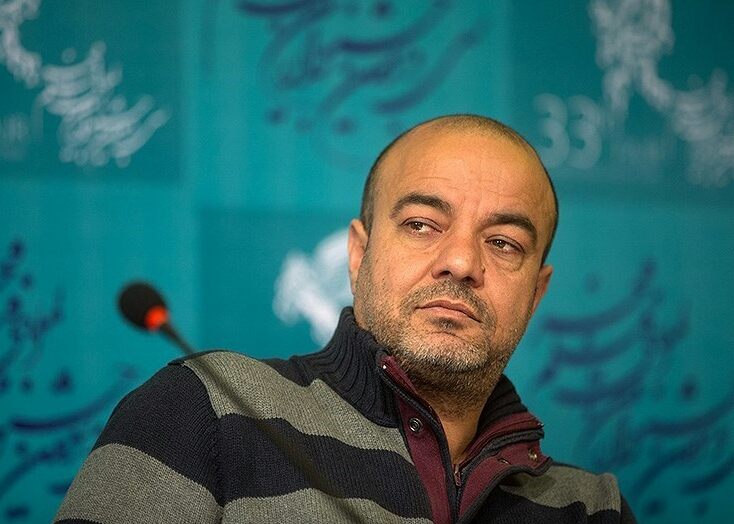
- Aghakhani at the 2015 Fajr International Film Festival
- Born: February 23, 1972 (age 54); Bijar, Iran
- Occupations: Actor, director, screenwriter
- Years active: 1993–present
- Spouse: Golrokh Haghighi

Saeed Aghakhani (Persian: سعید آقاخانی, born February 23, 1972) is an Iranian actor and director. He has received various accolades, including a Crystal Simorgh, two Iran's Film Critics and Writers Association Awards and a Duhok International Film Festival Award.

== Filmography ==
=== Film ===
Year	Title	Role	Director	Notes	Ref.
2015	I Am Diego Maradona	Farhad	Bahram Tavakoli		
2019	African Violet	Reza	Mona Zandi Haghighi		
2019	Oath	Khosrow	Mohsen Tanabandeh		
2020	It Turned into Blood	Fazli	Masoud Kimiai		
2025	Khati		Fereydoun Najafi		
2025	Guardian of the Field		Mohammad Reza Kheradmandan		

=== Television ===
Year	Name	Director	Aghakhani's Part
1993	Flight no. 57	Mehran Modiri	Actor
1994	Joyful Hour	Mehran Modiri	Actor
1995	Joyful Year	Mehran Modiri	Actor
1996	Home to Home	Kianoush Ayari	Actor
1996	Hello, Hello!	Ali Semnani	Actor
1997	All My Children	Mohammad Dastgerdi	Actor
1997	Gallery No. 9	Gholamreza Rezaei	Actor
1997	The magic of the moonlight	Bahman Zarrinpour	Actor
1998	Farrokh & Faraj Residential Complex	Asghar Farhadi	Actor
1998	The Waiter	Asghar Farhadi	Actor
1999	The Nest	Ghasem Jafari	Actor
1999	Story of a City	Asghar Farhadi	Guest appearance
2001	Story of a City II	Asghar Farhadi	Actor
2001	House of Wishes	Hossein Soheilizadeh	Actor
2001–02	Heavenly Police	Fereshteh Sadre Orafaee	Actor
2002	Night tales	Saeed Aghakhani	Actor & Director
2002	Poshte Konkooriha	Parisa Bakhtavar	Actor
2003	The Marshal	Mohsen Shahmohammadi	Actor
2004	I'm A Tenant	Parisa Bakhtavar	Actor
2004	Homeless	Reza Attaran	Screenwriter
2004	Fasten Your Seatbelts	Mehdi Mazloumi	Actor
2005	The Accused Escaped	Reza Attaran	Actor
2006	Mr. Habib's Happy Time	Saeed Aghakhani; Mehdi Mazloumi	Actor & Director
2007	SMS from another World	Siroos Moghaddam	Acting coach
2007	The Adventures of Dear Taghi	Marzie Mahboob	Actor
2009	This year's holiday	Saeed Aghakhani	Director
2010	Stepmom	Saeed Aghakhani	Director
2010	Enclosure	Siroos Moghaddam	Actor & Acting coach
2010	Khooshneshinha	Saeed Aghakhani	Director
2010	Dani and Me	Arzhang Amirfazli	Actor
2011	Escape Path	Saeed Aghakhani	Actor & Director
2011	Noghte Sarekhat	Siroos Moghaddam	Director
2012	Thieves and police	Saeed Aghakhani	Director
2013	The Rooster	Saeed Aghakhani	Director
2014	Bad Days Pass	Saeed Aghakhani	Director
2014	Other One	Ahmad Kaveri	Actor
2015	Standardized Patient	Saeed Aghakhani	Director
2017	The Eve	Saeed Aghakhani	Director
2019–	Noon Khe	Saeed Aghakhani	Actor & Director

=== Web ===
Year	Title	Role	Director	Platform	Ref.
2017	The Excellency	Parviz Amani	Sam Gharibian	Video CD	
2022	The Secret of Survival		Saeed Aghakhani	Filmnet	
