= George Khutsishvili =

Georgian philosopher (1948–2013)

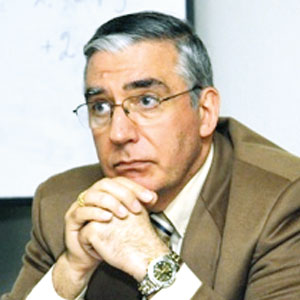
- Born: 15 November 1948
- Died: 4 October 2013 (aged 64); Tbilisi

George Khutsishvili Doctor of Philosophy, Professor (Georgian: გიორგი ხუციშვილი; 15 November 1948 – 4 October 2013), was a prominent Georgian public figure, one of the founders of conflictology in Georgia and the Caucasian region and a scientist in the field of peace and conflict studies. In 1994 he founded the independent non-for-profit and non-partisan International Center on Conflict and Negotiation (ICCN). Between 1995 and 2013 he was the publisher of Peace Times, Conflicts and Negotiations and Alternatives to Conflict’ amongst others. For many years he was invited to work as a professor at different leading universities in Georgia and abroad. George Khutsishvili made significant input into study of the essence of theoretical thinking and the problem of the infinite in the light of philosophy and mathematics (1970-80s). From the 1990s to the end of his days he dedicated his life to establishing and developing peace and conflict studies in Georgia.

== Childhood ==
Khutsishvili was born on 15 November 1948 in Tbilisi to the family of Shota and Sophio (Samiko) Khutsishvili. He quickly developed a professional knowledge of Russian and English, and considered trilingual in English, Russian, Georgian, as well as a basic knowledge of German, Polish and the Italian languages.

== Education and academic degrees ==
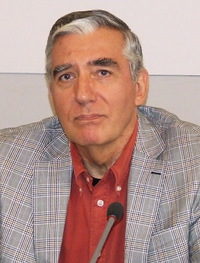
George Kutsishvili

In 1966 Khutsishvili graduated from the Tbilisi I.N.Vekua phys-math secondary school N42, and enrolled in Tbilisi State University, in the department of mechanics and mathematics, from which he graduated in 1971. In 1976, he passed his PhD defense with a thesis on “Infinity and the Problem of its Abstraction in Science” and was awarded the degree of Doctor of Philosophy in 1977. The Supreme Attestation Commission (Moscow) awarded him the title of Professor of Philosophy in 1982. In 1987, he completed an intensive course in “English Language Simultaneous Translations” and was awarded a diploma. In 1991 he was invited to Kyiv due to his published work in Russian. In 1991 he was awarded a degree of Doctor of Philosophy by the Ukraine Academy of Sciences, In 1995, he was awarded the Harvard Law School Certificate of Negotiation Training of the Program of Instruction for Lawyers.

== Professional activities ==
In 1971–1972, he worked as an applied mathematician at the Institute of Management Systems at the Academy of Sciences of Georgia. In 1972-1979 he worked as a researcher and then as a senior researcher at the Institute of Philosophy of the Georgian Academy of Sciences.

In 1979, Khutsishvili was elected deputy chair of the Methodological Council of the Academy of Sciences, and later was co-chair until 1988. He was frequently invited to deliver public lectures on democratic reforms, which the Methodological Council was conducting regularly in the period of Gorbachev's “Perestroika”. In October 1988, on behalf of the East German organization Kulturbund, Olaph Krebe, invited him to several leading universities in Germany to deliver a series of lectures (the Alexander Humboldt University, East Berlin, the Karl Marx University, and the Leipzig, Halle and Dresden Universities).

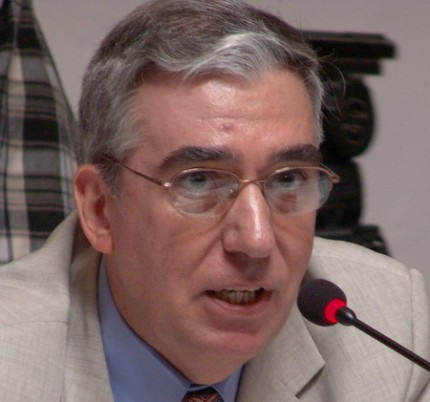
Gorge Kutsishvili

At the end of the 80s, Khutsishvili started researching various methodologies of finding water, biolocation, and bioenergy. His interest in this field was stirred after meeting with the representatives of American dowsers at a Conference in 1989 in the United States. Later, from the beginning of the 1990s, he became a member of the American Society of Dowsers. In 1989, the Institute of Neotic Sciences invited George Khutsishvili to conduct research and awarded him a membership for one year (1990-1991).

In 1988-1990 he went on to work as the head of the Department of Social Sciences at the Ministry of Education of Georgia. In 1992, the Tbilisi State Institute of Foreign languages and Pedagogical Sciences elected him full professor. He had earlier since 1981 held the position of associate professor and chair of Philosophy.

The State Committee for Human Rights and Ethnic Relations, established in 1992, opened the Centre for Conflict Analysis, especially for Professor George Khutsishvili. The Centre functioned for 1 year.

On 8 January 1993, Khutsishvili was invited to be a Research Fellow to the Centre for International Security and Arms Control, at Stanford University in the United States While there, he received funding from David Packard, The American press at that time spoke about George Khutsishvili as a “Fellowship Brings Unique Georgian Perspective to Stanford”. He was offered work as a consultant the following year in the same Centre, on ethnic conflicts in the post-Soviet space (1994–95).

In the spring of 1993 he was awarded a NATO Research Fellowship (Democratic Institutions Individual Fellowships Program) grant for “Caucasus Knot of Conflicts in Light of Growing Global Insecurity”. In 1994 he became associate professor of Conflict and Peace Studies at the Department of International Law and International Relations, at Iv. Javakhishvili Tbilisi State University, where he worked until 2006.

In 1995 –1997, he was appointed professor of sociology at the American University of Hawaii's Tbilisi Campus. In 1995, he was elected Vice - President of the Academy of Georgian Philosophic Sciences,. He held this position through 1997. He in 1998, Khutsishvili was invited to the position of professor of Conflict Studies, at the Humanitarian-Technical Department of the Georgian Technical University, where he delivered lectures until 2001.

From 2001 to 2010, George Khutsishvili had been invited to be a member of several state commissions at different ministries to work on Caucasus oil/gas pipeline projects, public opinion and media, the development of a National Security Concept for Georgia, cooperation with civil society, conflict resolution, elections, and other issues.

In 2006–2011, he held the position of a full professor at the Georgian University. For many years, he worked as a member of the commission for selecting academic positions, and on the scientific board for granting degrees in the social sciences at Iv. Javakhishvili Tbilisi State University.

In 2008-2009 he worked as the Chief Investigator of the Multi-track Dialogue for the Georgian-Abkhazian Conflict, in an international programme supported by the European Commission. In 2001–2002, 2009, and 2011–2012, he was invited by the USAID to become a member of conflict assessment mission groups in Georgia.

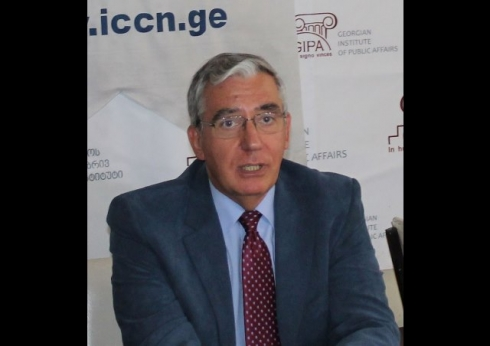
Gorge Kutsishvili

== International Centre on Conflict and Negotiation (ICCN) ==
Khutsishvili developed his interest in conflict resolution from the beginning of the 1990s. At that time, this field did not exist in Georgia, while in the west it was rather well developed. In that period, he worked in the Tbilisi Business School where he first introduced his course of studies in conflictology.

Upon his return from the United States in 1994, Khutsishvili established the first independent high-profile organization in Georgia, which gave birth to the Georgian educational and scientific programs on conflict and peace studies. George Khutsishvili and 63 other founding members launched their organization at a meeting held on 8 August 1994, where they established “The International Center on Conflicts and Negotiations Strategy”. He was granted status as the founder. This non-profit organization with international status was registered by the Department of Registration of the Ministry of Justice of Republic of Georgia on 3 October 1994.

On 30 December 1998, the name of the centre was changed to the International Center on Conflict and Negotiation (ICCN) ([www.ICCN.ge]). Khutsishvili headed the center until the end of his life. The Centre continues its activities and is a powerful, field-oriented NGO in Georgia, as well as in the Caucasian region.

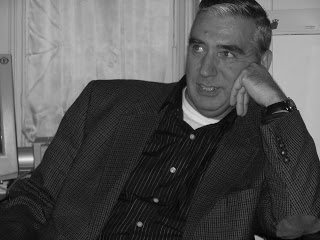
Gorge Kutsishvili

=== Peace activities ===
Starting in 1995, he edited and issued trilingual magazines and bulletins which provided relevant expert and educational materials on conflict and peace issues for conflict affected

populations. With this, he made a valuable contribution to strengthening civil society; (“Conflicts and Negotiations” (1995-2001); “Alternative” (1996-1998); “Monada” (1997-1998); “Alternative to Conflict” (1998-2003); “Peace Times” (2001-2013)).

Since 1995, the foundation has been laid for Georgian-Abkhaz and Georgian-Ossetian dialogues, on the initiative of George Khutsishvili, in the format of public diplomacy. The International Centre on Conflict and Negotiation headed by Khutsishvili was a pioneer to start dialogue process. He addressed the Abkhaz people at the Conference (1995) in Moscow, proposing to start the first dialogue, where he met Manana Gurgulia and Roman Dbar. Kumar Rupesinkhe, who was then a representative of International Alert (IA), London, took an interest in Khutsishvili's idea, and later the first Georgian-Abkhazian dialogue project was implemented with Rupesinkhe's support. This project lasted for many years. The first Georgian-Abkhazian dialogue took place in July 1996. The process of a Georgian–Ossetian dialogue started in 1995. The scientist Roger Fisher contacted professor Khutsishvili and offered his cooperation in the Georgian–Ossetian and Georgian-Abkhazian format (Conflict Management Group (CMG) USA). This is how the Georgian–Ossetian dialogue started with the support and financial aid of the NRC (Norwegian Refugee Council). From the very start, this organization ensured their support to Khutsishvili's Centre in educational programs for IDPs (Internally Displaced Persons). The first Georgian-Ossetian meeting took place in January 1996, in Oslo, upon the request of the NRC.

In 1996, Khutsishvili held a joint seminar on “Developing a Regional Security Concept for the Caucasus” with NATO. This seminar attracted the attention of the West with the following message of his organization: “We need to develop the concept of regional security first, rather than the concepts of national security”. The working topic of this seminar was based on George Khutsishvili's idea, which he had proposed to NATO. In that period, NATO was developing the concept of national security in almost all post–Soviet countries, in order to help the nations. Khutsishvili's idea, which insisted that national security concepts could not be developed without regional security concepts, was considered, discussed and summarized at the seminar. The results were published in the following book in the Georgian and English languages: “Developing a Regional Security Concept for the Caucasus”, International Conference materials, 4–6 October 1996, Tbilisi, Georgia. Editor–George Khutsishvili, 1997. Later, NATO introduced the above approach to many other countries. In 2003, he was one of the conveners of a special meeting that founded the “Public Movement against Religious Extremism” to counteract the violent actions of religious extremism that had been gaining momentum in that period. In 2003–2013, he was a member of the International Steering Group of the Global Partnership for the Prevention of Armed Conflict (GPPAC). Within the format of this network, he participated in the work of groups studying different conflicts all over the world. As well as that, he was a member of special missions for international conflict studies, prevention and resolution. The organization founded by George Khutsishvili continues its membership in the GPPAC network, and is its representative in the Caucasus.

The first NGO Congress was held in 2006 in Georgia, followed by the Second and Third NGO Congresses, in 2007 and 2008 respectively, in which Georgian NGOs participated extensively.

After the Russian-Georgian War in August 2008, the post-war rounds of Georgian-Russian meetings and negotiations started on the initiative of professor George Khutsishvili, which later was called the Istanbul Process, being named so due to it being the first post-war meeting ever, which was held in Istanbul in November 2008. This very first meeting laid the foundation for expert dialogue, which is still going on within the same format. By means of this dialogue, experts have studied the fundamental reasons of the conflict and the ways towards its resolution, jointly. The materials of this Georgian-Russian dialogue, and the ways discussed of overcoming the crises, have already been published in a book.

G. Khutsishvili was one of the initiators and a founder of the Public Constitutional Commission (PCC), www.konstitucia.ge), which was created in response to the existing political crisis in the country. This PCC united constitutionalists and public figures of the country in 2009–2011. The Public Constitutional Commission developed a completely revised version of the Constitution for the country, which was free from political and party interests. This version of the Constitution of Georgia, which was developed by the authorship of 17 commission members, was published on 9 April 2010 in a book form (an Expanded Concept of the New Edition of the Constitution of Georgia, Tbilisi, 9 April 2010, ISBN 978-9941-0-2364-4).

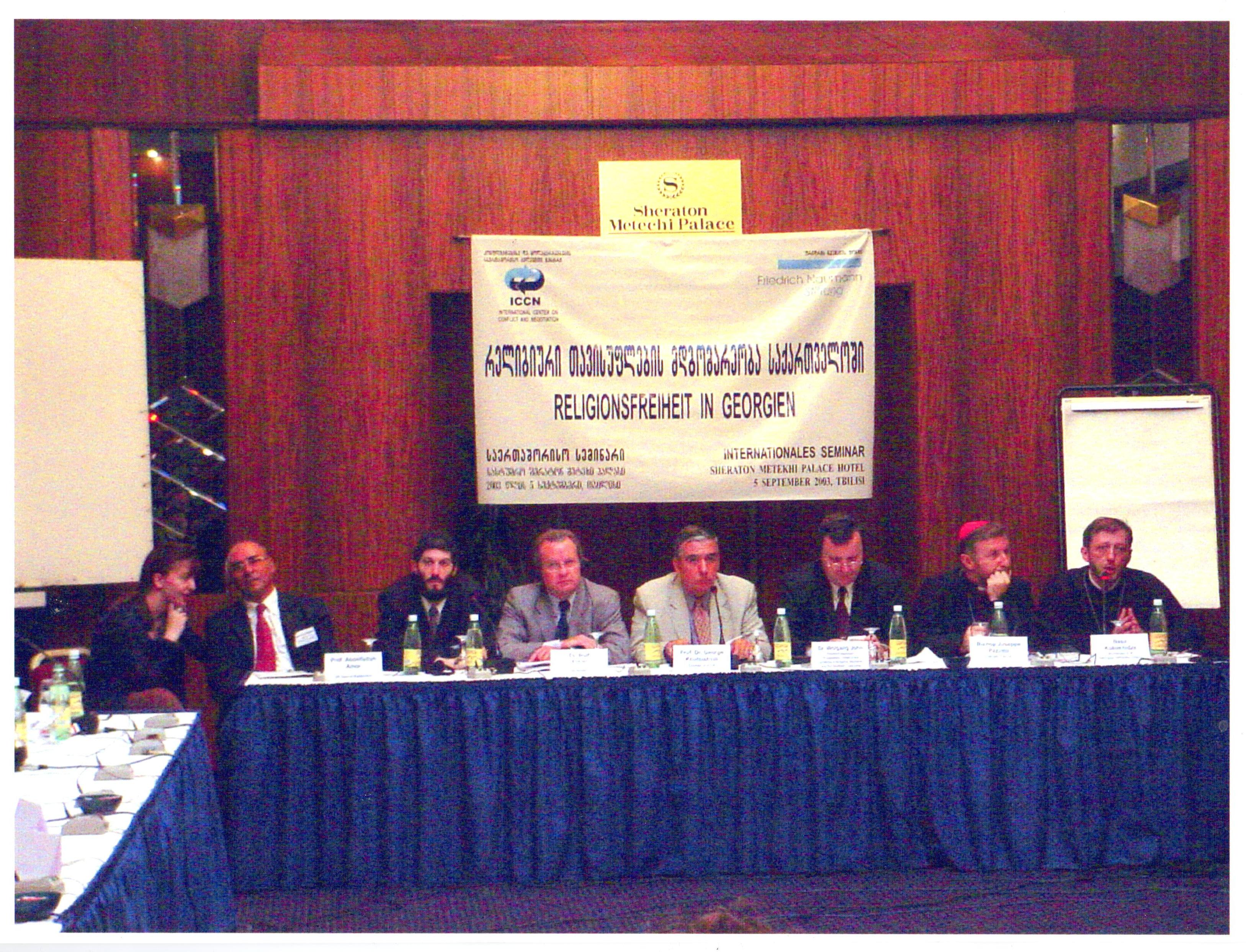
“Condition of religious Freedom in Georgia’. George Khutsishvili, organizer of the Conference at Sheraton Metechi Palace, Tbilisi, Georgia

== Death ==
George Khutsishvili died unexpectedly on 4 October 2013 during a session of the commission for the selection of academic positions.

== Publications ==
The author of 20 monographs and co-author and/or compiling editor of many others; the author or co-author of more than 200 scientific articles published in Georgian, English and Russian languages, one fiction, and many social and political articles in newspapers.

== Books ==
Posthumous Publications

- 2018 - George Khutsishvili, HOW TO RESOLVE CONFLICTS, BOOK IV, ICCN, Tbilisi, 2018. ISBN 978-9941-9483-3-6; (in English);
- 2018 - George Khutsishvili: Works on Philosophy, Book V, ICCN, Tbilisi, 2018. ISBN 978-9941-9483-4-3; (in Russian);

Author, co-author, editor, publisher

- 2013 - Research Paper “Russia-Georgia: reciprocal perception” (editor, head of research group), ICCN, Tbilisi, 2013. ISBN 978-99940-805-5-7; (in Russian and English languages);
- 2013 - A Life dedicated to and Idea (author, editor and publisher). Tbilisi, 2013, The book is dedicated to the life and works of a renowned Georgian inventor Shota Khutsishvili whose main invention still awaits its proper assessment and recognition. ISBN 978-9941-0-5443-3, (in Georgian, Russian and English languages);
- 2013 - The Diary of one seminarian, 1879–1882, Alexander Kipshidze (Proneli), (publisher), Tbilisi, 2013, ISBN 978-9941-0-5831-8; (in Georgian language);
- 2011 - Letters to the Family (1937-1957), (publisher), Tbilisi, 2011, ISBN 978-9941-0-2697-3, (in Georgian language);
- 2011 - Russia and Georgia: The Ways Out of the Crisis; Россия и Грузия: Пути выхода из кризиса (editor and co-author). Tbilisi: ICCN & GPPAC, ISBN 978-99940-805-0-2 (in English and Russian languages);
- 2010 – In co-authorship, Authots: O.Benidze, O.Gamkrelidze, Ek.Gasitashvili, N.Gvenetadze, G.Inauri, V.Loria, L.Mukhashavria, M.Turava, M.Ugrekhelidze, Z.Koridze, Z.Kutsnashvili, N.Tsikhistavi, V.Dzabiradze, V.Khmaladze, G. Khutsishvili, Z.Jinjolava, Z.Jibgashvili - Enlarged Concept of a New Version of Georgian Constitution, Tbilisi, 2010, Georgia. ISBN 978-9941-0-2364-4, (in Georgian and English languages);
- 2008 - Civil Society and the Rose Revolution in Georgia (editor and co-author), Tbilisi: Cordaid & ICCN, ISBN 978-99928-824-6-7, (in English & Georgian languages);
- 2008 - Minorities in Georgia: Situational Analysis Internally Displaced People, Muslim Meskhs, Religious Minorities, Ethnic Minorities (co-editor). EED & ICCN: Tbilisi ISBN 9789992882-4-1-2, (in Georgian and English languages);
- 2003 - Terrorism: What Should We Know About It? Tbilisi: ICCN & Friedrich Naumann Foundation ISBN 99928-937-9-6, (in Georgian and Russian languages);
- 2003 - In co-authorship with Feride Zurikashvili, Guguli Magradze, Nani Chanishvili, Revaz Jorbenadze. Conflict, Gender and Peacebuilding. Second Edition, UNIFEM: New York City & Tbilisi, ISBN 99928-0-692-3, (in Georgian language);
- 2002 - The Abkhazia Problem Reflected by Public Opinion: Findings of the Sociological Surveys in Georgia (2001-2002). Tbilisi ICCN (editor), ISBN 99928-937-6-1, (in Georgian, Russian and English languages);
- 2002 - In co-authorship with Nani Chanishvili, Revaz Jorbenadze, Guguli Magradze, Feride Zurikashvili. Conflict, Gender and Peacebuilding. First Edition, UNIFEM: New York & Tbilisi, ISBN 99928-0-425-4, (in Georgian language);
- 2002 - Prospects of Conflict Resolution in the South Caucasus: Findings of Sociological Surveys (editor and co-author). Tbilisi:ICCN & Friedrich Ebert Stiftung, ISBN 99928-937-2-90 (in Russian and English language);
- 2001 - George Khutsishvili, Rusudan Mshvidobadze, George Nizharadze. Integration and Conflict Resolution in the South Caucasus: Reality or Illusion? (Findings of Sociological Surveys). Tbilisi: ICCN, ISBN 99928-824-8-3 (in Russian language with English Summary);
- 2000-2001 - How to Resolve Conflicts (ICCN Peace Education Series I-IV, editor). Tbilisi: ICCN, (I - ISBN 99928-824-9-2; II - ISBN 99928-824-8-4; III - ISBN 99928-824-2-5; IV - ISBN 99928-824-4-1), (in Georgian language);
- 1999 - Restoring the Culture of Peace in the Caucasus : A Human Solidarity Document (editor), by Marina Pagava. Tbilisi: ICCN, ISBN 99928-58-13-3, (in Georgian and English language);
- 1998 - Understanding Conflict. Tbilisi: ICCN (editor & co-author); ISBN 99928-58-07-9, (in English language);
- 1997 - Developing a Regional Security Concept for the Caucasus. Materials of the NATO-ICCN Workshop (chair & co-author, ed). Tbilisi: ICCN, (in Georgian and English language);
- 1989 - Genesis of the Structure of Theoretical Thinking. Tbilisi: Academic Press, 1989, ISBN 5-520-00219-3, (in Russian language);
- 1981 - The Problem of the Infinite in the Light of Modern Science. Tbilisi: Academic Press, 1981, X/10503/M607(06)-81/192-81, (in Russian language).

== Other ==
- S.O.S. (psychological story). На холмах Грузии (Литературный альманах). Tbilisi, No.12. 2010. Reprinted from Filosofskaya i Sociologicheskaya Mysl. (Publication of the Ukraine Academy of Sciences) Kyiv, #11, 1991. Originally published in the collection of Georgian writers “The House under the Plane Trees”. Tbilisi: Merani Publishers, 1988. Reprinted twice in Russian and once in Ukrainian; unpublished English translation made in USA is available from the author;
- 2002 - Dali's Stairway to Heaven, or the Sacred Geometry of the Cross. Peace Times (quarterly bilingual magazine), #4, 2002. ICCN: Tbilisi;
- 1996-2004 CultureGram: Republic of Georgia. (CultureGrams are published by Axiom Press), also available at www.culturegrams.com and Microsoft Encarta World Encyclopedia CD-ROM;
