= Karim Khudsiani =

Iranian announcer and screenwriter

- کریم خودسیانی
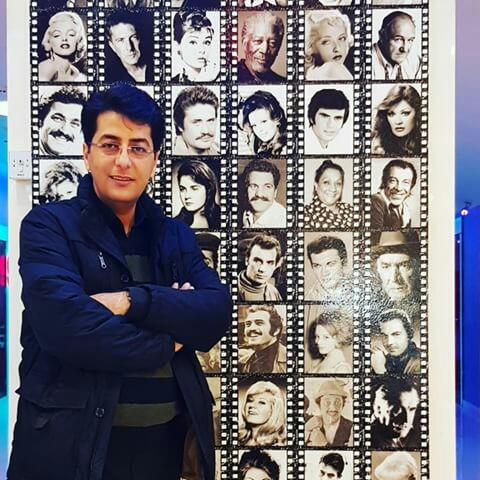
- Born: July 15, 1979 (age 47); Isfahan, Iran
- Occupations: Screenwriter; Presenter; Actor
- Years active: 1999-present
- Notable work: Ta madare 10 daraje 2015 *Chocolate 2017 *Katyusha 2018

Karim Khudsiani (Persian: کریم خودسیانی) is an Iranian Georgian Screenwriter, Television presenter and actor.

== Career ==
=== Writer ===
- Saye roshan 2011 (series)
- Ba ejaze bozorgtarha 2009 (series)
- Terme (series)
- Tajrobe haye aghaye khoshbakht (series)
- Labkhande bedune lahje (series)
- Siliye Shirin
- Ta madare 10 daraje 2015
- Chocolate 2017
- Katyusha 2018

=== Presenter ===
- Simaye Khanevade
- Saate Sheni
- Emrouz hanouz tamoum nashode

=== Actor ===
- Secret government (dolate makhfi) series
- Hamchon sarv
- Khastegaran

== See also ==
- Iranian Georgians
