= Hamid Lolayi =

Iranian actor and comedian

- حمید لولایی
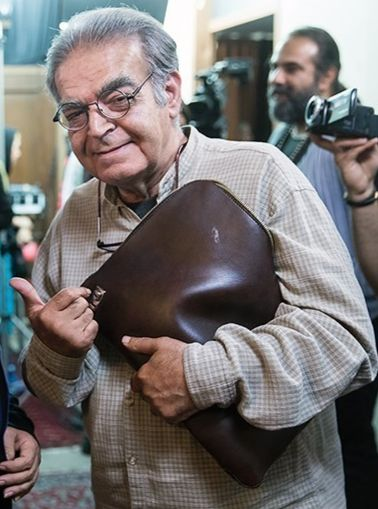
- Born: 25 December 1955 (age 70); Tehran, Iran
- Occupations: Actor, comedian
- Years active: 1979–present

Hamid Lolayi (Persian: حمید لولایی, born 24 December 1955) is an Iranian actor. He won the Crystal Simorgh for Best Supporting Actor at the Fajr Film Festival for his role in Chand Migiri Geryeh Koni (2005).

He gained fame through the television series Zire Aseman-e Shahr as “Khashayar Mostofi” and continued to build his reputation with roles in Khaneh Be Doosh as “Agha Mashallah” and Mosafers as “Farrokh Afrookhteh.”

== Personal and professional life ==
Hamid Lolayi was born in 1955 in the Eshratabad neighborhood of Tehran, with ancestral roots in northern Iran, though he spent his childhood near Eshratabad Square. He grew up in a large family with nine siblings. Lolayi married in 1990 and has two daughters.

He began his career in 1979 when Reza Ghasemi recommended him to director Reza Zhian for the theater production Sabzeh, Doost-e Bacheha, where he played the roles of “Elephant” and “Woodpecker.” In 1980, he performed in Bacheha va Khomreh-ye Sokhangu, directed by Siavash Tahmoures, and shortly after in An Shast Nafar, An Shast Hezar, directed by Bahram Ebrahimi.

Lolayi then appeared in a film that was not released publicly due to its poor quality. His first television experience was in Sarbazaran, where he had two heavily made-up scenes, but his parts were cut from the final broadcast due to the series being shortened. Following this, he stepped away from acting for about eight years, working as the manager of Azadi Cinema. In 1991, he returned with a role in the series Faramooshkhaneh, after which he resigned from his managerial position to focus on acting. Later, Ali Omrani invited him to join the comedy series Saat-e Khosh. Dariush Kardan was the first to recognize Lolayi’s comedic talent, inviting him to perform in Nowruz 72. However, it was his role in Saat-e Khosh that significantly increased his visibility. After a period of absence, his portrayal of “Khashayar Mostofi” in Zire Aseman-e Shahr, directed by Mehran Ghafourian, solidified his status as a prominent actor. Other notable roles include those in the series Torsh o Shirin, Charkhooneh, and the film Chand Migiri Geryeh Koni.

== Filmography ==
=== Cinema ===
Filmography
Year	Title	Director	Role
2021	Chaos	Seyed Mostafa Azad	
2021	Yesterday's Girl	Mani Armaghan	
2019	How Much You Want to Cry? 2	Ali Tavakolniya	
2018	Song in Sleep	Arash Sajjadi Hosseini	Fathi
2018	Apache	Arash Moayerian	
2014	Three Strangers	Mehdi Mazloumi	Haj Agha
2013	Carriage	Arash Moayerian	Abi
2013	Lamp 100	Saeed Aghakhani	Taxi Man
2012	Switch	Ali Tavakolniya	Factory Manager
2010	Concert on Water	Jahangir Jahangiri	Hedayat Hedayati
2009	Cry for Him	Asghar Baghal	
2009	Forced Father	Abbas Moradian	
2006	If You Can, Catch Me	Shahram Ahmadlou	
2006	Rule of the Game	Ahmadreza Motamedi	Antique Detective
2000	How Much You Want to Cry?	Shahram Ahmadlou	Ashkboos
2000	Dance of the Devil	Esmaeil Barari	
1997	Marriage Key	Davood Movassaghi	Boss
1997	Wrong Man	Mohammadreza Honarmand	
1995	Invisible Man	Faryal Behzad	
1994	Great Wish	Khosrow Shojaei	
1994	Encounter	Mohammadreza Honarmand	
1981	Sculptor - From Zenith to Apex	Mohammadreza Majed	

=== Series ===
TV Series
Year	Title	Director	Role
2024	Wheel of Fortune 2	Javad Mazdabadi	
2023	Wheel of Fortune		
2022	Reza the Grocer	Hamid Loolai	
2022	Sleight of Hand	Shahram Ahmadlou	
2022	Tide	Ali Abdolalizadeh	
2022	Good Name	Alireza Najafzadeh	Master Shafii
2021	Bootimar	Parviz Golabi	
2020	Kid of the Neighborhood	Ahmad Darvishalipour	Master Khanjan
2020	Noon Kha 2	Saeed Aghakhani	Pasha Khodaparast
2019	Life Is Wonderful	Mojtaba Cheraghali	
2018	Eid Night	Saeed Aghakhani	Mr. Seifi
2017	Puncture	Borzoo Niknejad	Uncle Parviz
2015	Three Shows	Seyed Javad Rezavian	
2014	Flower and Nightingale Neighborhood	Ahmad Darvishalipour	Amir Mohammad's Grandfather
2013–2014	Meraajiha	Masoud Dehnamaki	
2013	Rooster	Saeed Aghakhani	
2012	Thief and Police	Saeed Aghakhani	
2012	Rental House (Season 2)	Shahram Ahmadlou	
2011	Starting Point	Saeed Aghakhani	Samad Gheisari
2011	Four Wheels	Javad Mazdabadi	Zabih
2010	Happy Dwellers	Saeed Aghakhani	Touraj Sadri
2009	Travelers	Rambod Javan	Farrokh Afrookhteh
2008	Bazangah	Reza Attaran	Saber Parvar
2007	Text from the Hereafter	Siroos Moghadam	Bahram
2007	Charkhooneh	Soroosh Sehat	Mansour Jamali
2006	Sweet and Sour	Reza Attaran	Jahan Jahangiri
2005	Life on the Condition of Laughter	Mehdi Mazloumi	
2003–2004	House to House	Reza Attaran	Mashallah Marzoughi
2002	Under the City Sky (Season 3)	Mehran Ghafoorian	Khashayar Mastoofi
2001	Under the City Sky (Season 2)		Khashayar Mastoofi
2000	Under the City Sky (Season 1)		Khashayar Mastoofi
2000	Eternal Train	Reza Attaran	Neron
1999	Friendship Agency	Ahmad Ramadanzadeh	Kamyab
1999	Dani and I (Season 2)	Ali Abdolalizadeh	
1998	That Year's Eid	Saeed Ebrahimifar	Mirza Masoud Tehrani
1998	Trial	Hassan Hedayat	Doctor Ahmadi
1998	Majid My Dear	Reza Attaran	
1997	Sunflowers	Masoud Shahmohammadi	
1994	Happy Hour	Mehran Modiri	
1993	Nowruz 72	Dariush Kardan, Ali Omrani, Mehrdad Khosravi	
1992	Apartment	Asghar Hashemi	
1991	House of Forgetfulness	Abdolreza Navab Safavi	
1981	Sarbedaran	Mohammad Ali Najafi	
