= 37th Fajr Film Festival =

Film festival in Iran

- Opening film: A House for You by Mehdi Bakhshi Moghaddam
- Closing film: Midday Adventures: Trace of Blood by Mohammad Hossein Mahdavian
- Location: Milad Tower
- Founded: 1983
- No. of films: 45 films
- Festival date: Opening: February 1, 2019; Closing: February 11, 2019
- Website: Fajr Film Festival

Fajr Film Festival
- 38th 36th

37th Fajr Film Awards
- Date: February 11, 2019
- Site: Milad Tower, Tehran, Tehran Province, Iran
- Organised by: Farabi Cinema Foundation; Ministry of Culture and Islamic Guidance

Highlights
- Most awards: When the Moon Was Full (6)
- Most nominations: When the Moon Was Full (13)
- Best Film: When the Moon Was Full
- Special Jury Prize: Nima Javidi (director) – The Warden
- Audience Choice of Best Film: Just 6.5
- Website: Fajr Film Festival

Television/radio coverage
- Network: IRIB Namayesh

The 37th Fajr Film Festival (Persian: سی و هفتمین جشنواره فیلم فجر) was held from 1 to 11 February 2019 in Tehran, Iran. The nominees for the 37th Fajr Film Festival were announced on February 10, 2019, at the press conference.

== Winners and nominees ==
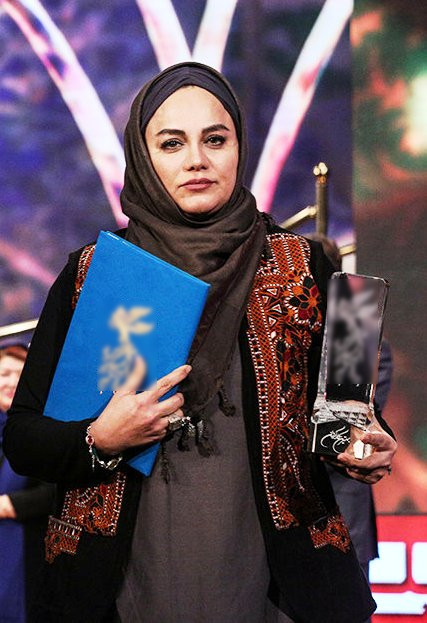
Narges Abyar, Best Film co-winner and Best Director winner

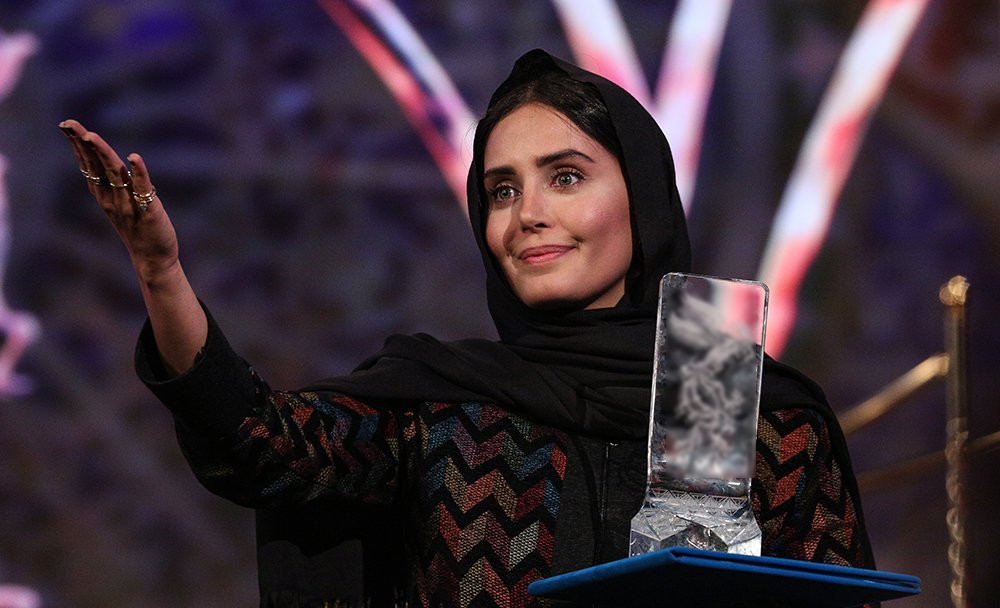
Elnaz Shakerdoost, Best Actress winner

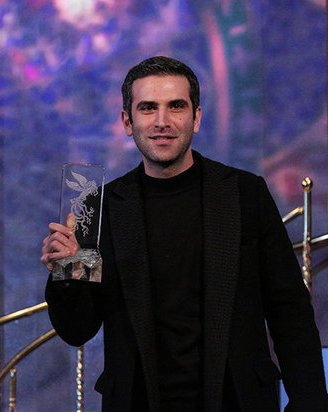
Hootan Shakiba, Best Actor winner

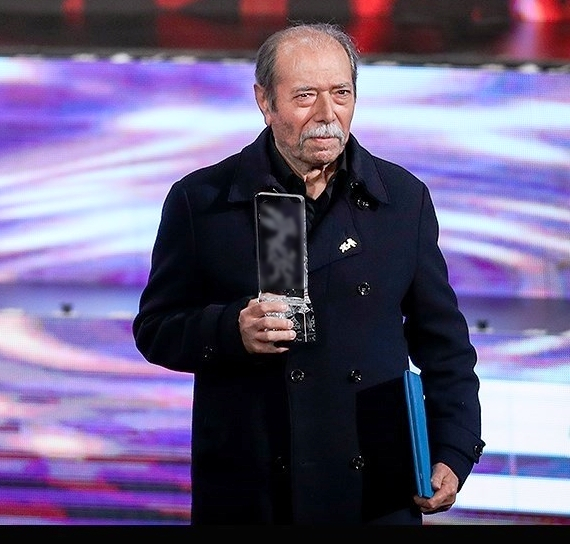
Ali Nassirian, Best Supporting Actor winner

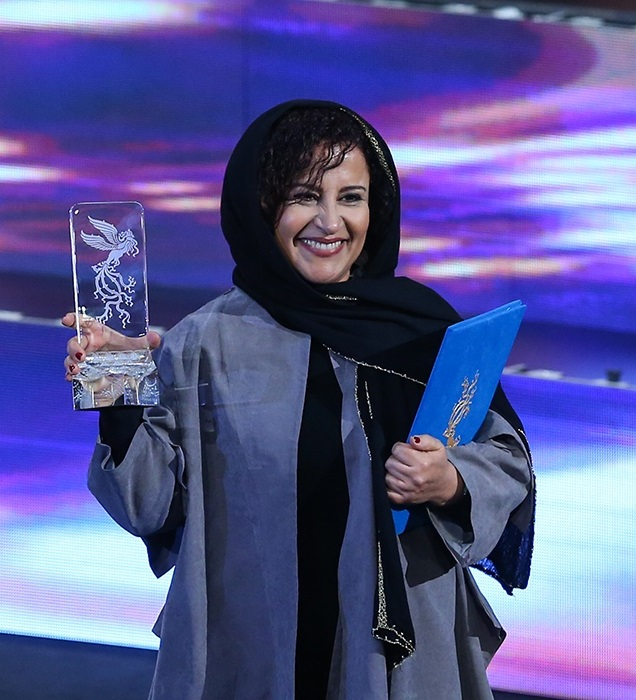
Fereshteh Sadre Orafaee, Best Supporting Actress winner

=== Main Competition ===
Best Director	Best Film
Narges Abyar – When the Moon Was Full; Mohammad Hossein Mahdavian – Midday Adventures: Trace of Blood; Saeed Roustayi – Just 6.5; Nima Javidi – The Warden; Reza Mirkarimi – Castle of Dreams; Bahram Tavakoli – Gholamreza Takhti	When the Moon Was Full; Midday Adventures: Trace of Blood; The Warden; Just 6.5; Castle of Dreams; Gholamreza Takhti
Best Actress	Best Actor
Elnaz Shakerdoost – When the Moon Was Full as Faezeh Mansouri; Behnoosh Tabatabaei – Midday Adventures: Trace of Blood as Sima; Mahnaz Afshar – Oath as Razieh; Fatemeh Motamed Arya – African Violet as Shokoo; Zhaleh Sameti – Darkhoongah as Tavoos	Hootan Shakiba – When the Moon Was Full as Abdolhamid Rigi; Navid Mohammadzadeh – The Warden as Nemat Jahed; Payman Maadi – Just 6.5 as Samad; Hamed Behdad – Castle of Dreams as Jalal; Amin Hayai – Darkhoongah as Reza Misagh
Best Supporting Actress	Best Supporting Actor
Fereshteh Sadreh Orafaei – When the Moon Was Full as Ghamnaz; Pantea Panahiha – Darkhoongah as Shahrzad; Zohreh Abbasi – Suddenly a Tree as Homa; Zhila Shahi – Castle of Dreams as Najmeh; Niousha Alipour – Castle of Dreams as Sara	Ali Nassirian – A Hairy Tale as Kazem Khan; Javad Ezzati – Midday Adventures: Trace of Blood as Sadegh; Navid Mohammadzadeh – Just 6.5 as Nasser Khakzad / Ali Rostami; Hasan Pourshirazi – Oath as Khalil; Armin Rahimian – When the Moon Was Full as Abdolmalek Rigi; Yuna Tadayyon – Castle of Dreams as Ali
Best Cinematography	Best Screenplay
Hamid Khozouie Abyane – Gholamreza Takhti; Hooman Behmanesh – Just 6.5; Hadi Behrooz – Midday Adventures: Trace of Blood; Shahram Najarian – Blood of God; Ali Ghazi – A Hairy Tale; Masoud Salami – The Agitation	Mohsen Gharaie, Mohammad Davoudi – Castle of Dreams; Nima Javidi – The Warden; Mohsen Tanabandeh – Oath; Parviz Shahbazi – Gold; Narges Abyar, Morteza Esfahani – When the Moon Was Full
Best Original Score	Best Editor
Amin Honarman – Castle of Dreams; Peyman Yazdanian – Just 6.5, African Violet; Masoud Sekhavatdoust – When the Moon Was Full; Christophe Rezai – Suddenly A Tree, My Second Year in College; Afshin Azizi – Gholamreza Takhti	Bahram Dehghani – Just 6.5; Mohammad Najarian – Midday Adventures: Trace of Blood; Mohammad Reza Mouyini – Symphony No. 9; Khashayar Movaheddian – Oath; Maysam Molaei – Gholamreza Takhti
Best Sound Effects	Best Sound Recording
Mehrshad Malakouti – Midday Adventures: Trace of Blood; Amir Hossein Ghasemi – Just 6.5; Hosein Abolsedgh – Symphony No. 9; Arash Ghasemi – When the Moon Was Full; Amir Hossein Ghasemi – Gholamreza Takhti	Iraj Shahzadi – Just 6.5; Masih Seraj – Camel Coat; Bahman Ardalan – 23 People; Mansour Shahbazi – Gold; Mehdi Ebrahimzadeh – Oath
Best Production Design	Best Costume Design
Keyvan Moghaddam – Gholamreza Takhti; Soheil Daneshraqi – A Hairy Tale; Mohamadreza Shojaei – When the Moon Was Full; Mohsen Nassrollahi – Just 6.5, The Warden; Kamyab Aminashayeri – 23 People	Mohammad Reza Shojaei – Midday Adventures: Trace of Blood; Meshkin Mehrgan – Symphony No. 9; Mohamadreza Shojaei – When the Moon Was Full; Amir Malekpour – Gholamreza Takhti; Elham Moien – A Hairy Tale
Best Special Effects	Best Makeup
Iman Karamian – Midday Adventures: Trace of Blood; Mohsen Rouzbahani – 23 People; Iman Karamian – Symphony No. 9; Arash Aghabeik – When the Moon Was Full; Arsha Aghdasi – Oath	Iman Omidvar – When the Moon Was Full; Majid Eskandari – Symphony No. 9; Shahram Khalaj – Midday Adventures: Trace of Blood; Abbas Abbasi – 23 People; Saeid Malekan – Gholamreza Takhti; Iman Omidvar – A Hairy Tale
Audience Choice of Best Film	Best Visual Effects
1. Just 6.5; 2. The Warden; 3. Gholamreza Takhti; 4. When the Moon Was Full; 5. Midday Adventures: Trace of Blood	Javad Motavari – A Hairy Tale; Javad Motavari – The Warden; Hadi Eslami, Amir Saharkhiz – 23 People; Sina Ghavidel – Midday Adventures: Trace of Blood; Mohsen Khirabadi, Reza Misaghi, Shahab Najafi – Gholamreza Takhti
Special Jury Prize	Best National Film
Nima Javidi – The Warden	23 People
Best Animation	Best Art & Experience Film
The Last Fiction; Benyamin; Sunny Night	A Hairy Tale
Best Documentary	Best Short Film
Melat House Hospital; All the Things That are Missing; A House for You; Beloved; Copper Notes of a Dream	Child Eater; Bitter Sea; Dissect; You're Still Here; S; Reverence; Fault

=== First Look ===
Best First Film
- A Hairy Tale
  - Alive
  - Gold Carrier
  - Watching This Movie Is a Crime
  - Orange Days

=== Advertising Competition ===
Best Poster Design	Best Still Photography
Taha Zaker – Kupal; Mohammad Taghi Pour – The Lost Strait; Mohammad Hossein Houshmandi – Cold Sweat; Erfan Bahkar Mehrbani – Pig; Mohammad Rouholamin – Confiscation	Habib Majidi – Bomb: A Love Story; Kourosh Pirou – Behind the Wall of Silence; Mohammad Badrloo – The Lost Strait; Maryam Takhtkeshian – Murphy's Law; Amirhossein Shojaei – Sheeple
Best Trailer
Rouhollah Mohedi – A Bigger Game; Kazem Mollaie – Kupal; Hamid Najafirad – Pig, No Date, No Signature; Masoud Rafizadeh – Sheeple

=== Films with multiple wins ===
Wins	Films
6	When the Moon Was Full
3	Midday Adventures: Trace of Blood
3	Just 6.5
3	A Hairy Tale
2	Gholamreza Takhti
2	Castle of Dreams

=== Films with multiple nominations ===
Nominations	Films
13	When the Moon Was Full
11	Midday Adventures: Trace of Blood
10	Just 6.5
10	Gholamreza Takhti
8	Castle of Dreams
6	Oath
6	A Hairy Tale
6	The Warden
5	23 People
5	Symphony No. 9
3	Darkhoongah
2	African Violet
2	Gold
2	Suddenly A Tree

== Films ==
=== Main Competition ===
Title	Director
The Agitation	Fereydoun Jeyrani
Main Idea	Azita Moguie
African Violet	Mona Zandi Haghighi
23 People	Mehdi Jafari
Polo Coat	Mehdi Alimirzaei
Blade and Termeh	Kiumars Pourahmad
Jamshidieh	Yalda Jebeli
Blood of God	Morteza Ali Abbas Mirzaei
Darkhoongah	Siavash Asadi
My Second Year in College	Rasul Sadr Ameli
The Warden	Nima Javidi
Symphony No. 9	Mohammad Reza Honarmand
When the Moon Was Full	Narges Abyar
Gold	Parviz Shahbazi
Gholamreza Takhti	Bahram Tavakoli
Oath	Mohsen Tanabandeh
Castle of Dreams	Reza Mirkarimi
Midday Adventures: Trace of Blood	Mohammad Hossein Mahdavian
Just 6.5	Saeed Roustayi
A Man without a Shadow	Alireza Raisian
A Hairy Tale	Homayoun Ghanizadeh
Suddenly a Tree	Safi Yazdanian

=== First Look ===
Title	Director
Camel Coat	Mehdi Alimirzaei
Alive	Hossein Amiri Domari, Pedram Pouramiri
Watching This Movie Is a Crime	Reza Zehtabchian
Gold Carrier	Touraj Aslani
Orange Days	Arash Lahooti
Snake Venom	Javad Razavian
Tsunami	Milad Sadrameli
A Hairy Tale	Homayoun Ghanizadeh
Reverse	Poulad Kimiayi
Yalda, a Night for Forgiveness	Massoud Bakhshi

=== Animation ===
Title	Director
The Last Fiction	Ashkan Rahgozar
Benyamin	Mohsen Enayati
Sunny Night	Ali Madani

=== Documentary ===
Title	Director
Melat House Hospital	Babak Behdad
All the Things That are Missing	Zeinab Tabrizi
A House for You	Mehdi Bakhshi Moghaddam
Beloved	Yaser Talebi
Copper Notes of a Dream	Reza Farahmand

=== Short film ===
Title	Director
Fault	Soheil Amir Sharifi
Reverence	Sogol Rezvani
S	Hamed Aslani
You're Still Here	Mohammad Rouhbakhsh, Katayoun Parmar
Dissect	Siavash Shahabi
Child Eater	Mohammad Kart
Bitter Sea	Fatemeh Ahmadi
