= Shabnam Moghaddami =

Iranian actress (born 1972)

- شبنم مقدمی
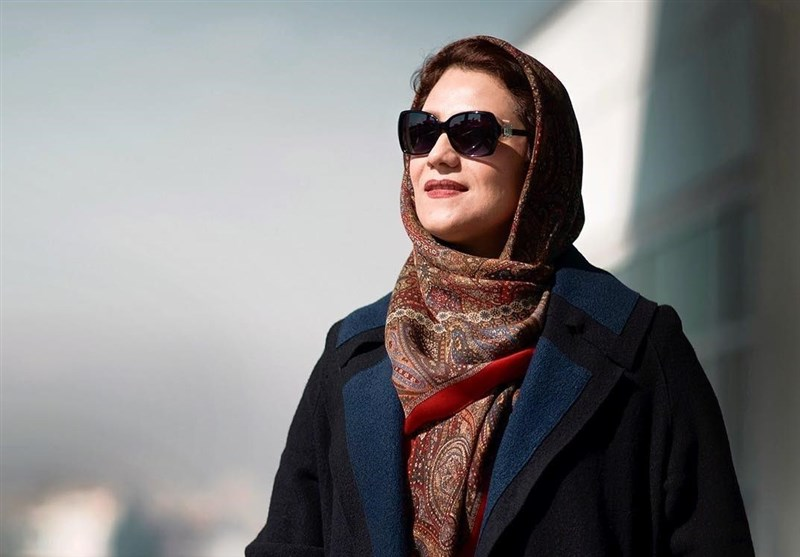
- Moghaddami in 2019
- Born: March 23, 1972 (age 54); Tehran, Iran
- Occupation: Actress
- Spouse: Alireza Ara (m. 2004)

Shabnam Moghaddami (Persian: شبنم مقدمی; born March 23, 1972), is an Iranian actress. She has received various accolades, including two Crystal Simorghs, three Hafez Awards, and an Iran's Film Critics and Writers Association Award.

Moghaddami's professional journey commenced in the 1990s, primarily focusing on theater. According to critical reviews, she is recognized for her skill in portraying characters with depth and bringing out various aspects of their personalities convincingly. Her versatility as an actress is evident in the diverse range of roles she has undertaken, spanning across genres such as comedy, drama, and historical productions. Moreover, she has showcased her adaptability to various mediums, including theater, cinema, television, and radio.

Throughout her career, Moghaddami has been recognized with approximately twenty award nominations and has earned over ten acting awards for her contributions to the industry. She has extensive experience in radio and has portrayed roles in numerous films and television series. Additionally, she continues to be actively involved in theater, demonstrating her dedication and commitment to her craft.

== Early life ==
Shabnam Moghaddami was born in Tehran on March 23, 1972, into a family with a background in culture, art, and literature. Her father was an electrical engineer, and her mother was a high-ranking employee at the University of Tehran. Moghaddami also has a younger brother named Behnam. In 2004, she married Alireza Ara, who remains her life partner to this day.

From an early age, she enrolled in acting classes and during high school became acquainted with the Children's Radio Group. She played some roles during this time. However, Moghaddami completed her secondary education in experimental sciences and graduated from university with a bachelor's degree in Persian literature.

Nonetheless, her passion for acting led her to participate in a screenwriting school of The Artistic Sect of the Islamic Republic under the supervision of renowned instructors. Afterward, she embarked on a new chapter in her life by taking acting courses at Amin Tarokh Acting School.

== Career ==
=== Theatre ===
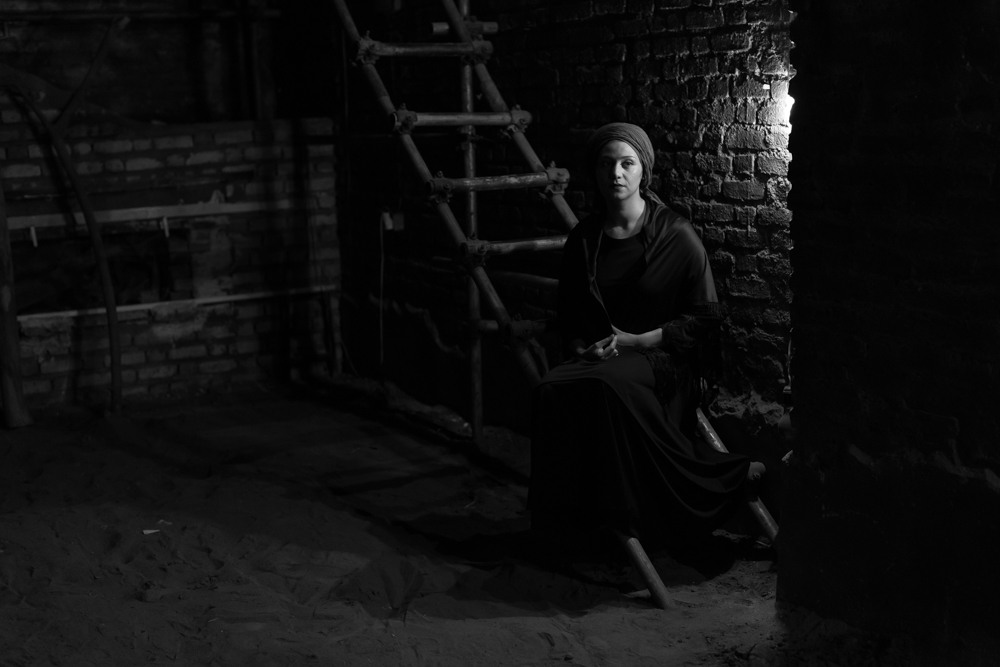
Moghaddami in 2012

Shabnam Moghaddami commenced her professional theater career in the late-1990s when she became a member of the "Shaya Theater Group." Her debut in the play "The Paper House," directed by Shahram Karami, marked the beginning of her theatrical journey. Since then, Moghaddami has been involved in a diverse range of theatrical productions, both in leading and supporting roles.Her repertoire spans classical and modern plays, as well as portrayals of characters from national and international literary works. Her performances have been featured in both national and international festivals, solidifying her reputation as a theater artist. Over the course of her career, she has collaborated with famous directors such as Hamid Amjad, Mohammad Rahmanian, Mas'oud Rayegan, and Keyumars Moradi.

Her contributions to the theater have earned her numerous nominations and awards, including being recognized as the Best Actress at the Third Actor Celebration of Iran's Theater Forum in 2006, and as the best actress in the actress's section at the Sixth Actors Celebration of the Association of Iran's Theater Forum. Some of her notable performances include "Pilgrim," "The Bridge," "Without Milk and Sugar," "Silence is My Heritage," "Terminal," "Death Garden," "Letters to Teb," "Merciless Killer, Hesse Karlson," "East is East!" "Tunnel", and "My Seagull."

=== Radio ===
Moghaddami has also been actively involved in the field of radio alongside her theater career. She has worked as a presenter and actress in various radio programs. Her academic background in Persian literature have made her particularly adept at hosting literary shows. She has contributed to radio stations such as Radio Javan, Radio Iran, and Radio Farhang. Some of her well-known radio programs include "Haft Shanbe" (Seven Saturdays), "Seshanbe Khat-Khati" (Crossword Tuesday) "Sedaye Ebrat" (Voice of Wisdom), and "Haft Taraneh" (Seven Songs), which have gained popularity among radio audiences in Iran. Furthermore, Moghaddami has collaborated with "Radio Sevina" (Special Cinema for the Visually Impaired) as well.

=== Screen ===
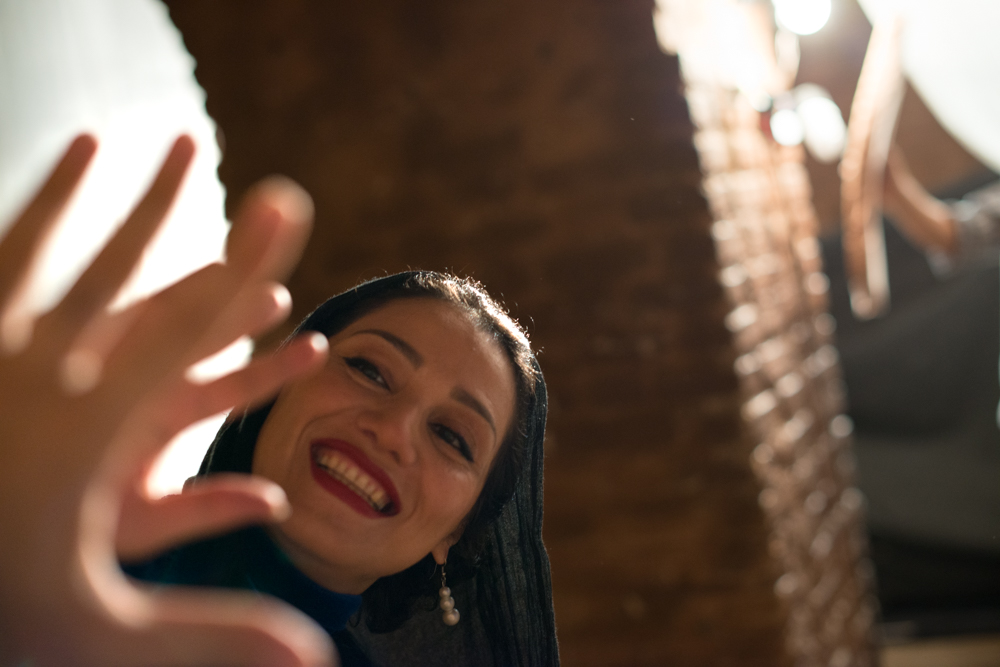
Moghaddami behind the scenes, 2013

Shabnam Moghaddami's involvement in cinema began in the late 1990s, with her debut in Kamran Qadakchian's film "Zakhmi"(injured). However, it was her role in Ebrahim Hatamikia's "be name pedar" (In the Name of the Father) that garnered serious attention and showcased her acting abilities paving the way for more challenging roles in her career. Throughout her career, she has collaborated with well known directors such as Asghar Farhadi, Iraj Karimi, Cyrus Moghaddam, Reza Mirkarimi, Maziar Miri, Hamid Amjad, Jafar Panahi, Ebrahim Hatamikia, Kamal Tabrizi, Saeed Roustayi, and Abbas Kiarostami.

Moghaddami receives praise from critics for her versatility as an actress. She seamlessly transitions between various genres, encompassing drama, comedy, historical productions, and more. As a result of her skillful performances, she has earned numerous accolades and recognition within the industry. She has received two Crystal Simorgh Awards that recognize her achievements in the film industry. Additionally, she has been honored with several awards and expressions of appreciation from the Association of Iranian Film Critics and Writers, contributing to her reputation as a talented and accomplished actress. Additionally, she holds a permanent membership in the Actors Association within the Iranian Alliance of Motion Picture (the House of Cinema).

Some of her notable film credits include "farsh-e Irani" (Iranian Carpet), "Gozaresh-e Yek Jashn" (A Report of a Feast), "Padash-e Sokoot" (The Reward of Silence), "Farzande Khak" (Child of the Earth), "Hamishe Paye Yek Zan Dar Miyan Ast" (There is Always a Woman in Between), "Koodak va Fereshteh" (Child and Angel), "Zir-e Aab" (The House Under the Water), "Emrooz" (Today), "Nafas" (Breath), "Zapas"(Spare) "Abad va Yek Rooz" (Life and a Day), "Abajan," "Khejalat Nakesh" (Don't Be Embarrassed), "Shabi Ke Mah Kamel Shod" (When the Moon Was Full), and "Shirin".

=== Television ===
After acquiring experience in the film industry, Shabnam Moghaddami made a return to television in the 2000s. In 2006, she starred in the popular series "Zir-e Tigh" (Under the Blade), alongside famous actors such as Parviz Parastui, Fatemeh Motamed-Arya, and Attila Pesiani. She also appeared in the television series "Pas Az Salha" (After Years) in 2008. In 2014, following her first Crystal Simorgh award, Moghaddami shifted her focus to television and took on leading roles in three series. She appeared in the series "Haft Sang" and "Madineh" for national television, as well as the series "Ablah"(The Fool) directed by Kamal Tabrizi for Home Video Streaming Network.

Moghaddami showcased her talent and versatility on television, receiving multiple Hafez Awards for her performances in comedy and drama genres.Additionally, she was honored with an award from the Jam-e-Jam Television Festival for her contributions to the small screen. Notable among her television series are "Hauola" (The Monster), "Khatun"(Once Upon a Time in Iran) "Bigonah" (Innocent), "Mardom-e Mamooli" (Ordinary People), and "Shabakeh-e Makhfi-ye Zanan" (Women's Secret Network).

=== Voice acting ===
With years of experience in radio and a background in radio drama, Shabnam Moghaddami has built a strong portfolio in the field of voice acting. In the television series "Yeki Bud, Yeki Nabud" directed by Reza Fayazi and produced in 2005, she lent her voice to one of the puppet characters. Additionally, in the third episode of the four-part animated series "Namha" directed by Reza Mir-Karimi, she provided the voice for the character Parvin Da'ipour, the wife of Hassan Bagheri.

In recent years, Moghaddami has expanded her activities in this field. She has lent her voice to the audio versions of prominent works such as "Cheraghha Ra Man Khamoosh Mikonam"(I Turn Off the Lights) by Zoya Pirzad and "Ghesseha-ye Sheikh Attar" (Sheikh Attar's Stories) by Mehdi Azar Yazdi (from the collection of Good Stories for Good Children). Furthermore, she has performed Persian voice-overs for the classic film "Gone with the Wind" by Margaret Mitchell, directed by Victor Fleming, and the film "Delshodegan" (Love-stricken) directed by Ali Hatami, specifically for Radio Sevina (Special Cinema for the Visually Impaired), which presents two memorable classic films each month with commentary by artists.

=== Breakthrough and rise to prominence ===
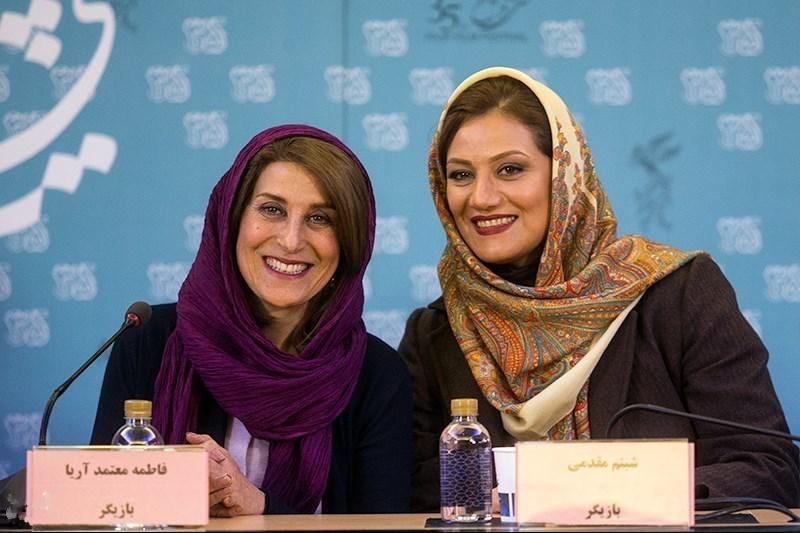
Shabnam Moghaddami alongside Fatemeh Motamed-Arya at the 35th Fajr Film Festival

Despite Shabnam Moghaddami's continuous presence on the theater stage and receiving awards in this medium during the 2000s, the 2010s can be considered the pinnacle of her career. In 2014, she rose to prominence by receiving her first Crystal Simorgh for Best Supporting Actress in the film "Today" at the 32nd Fajr Film Festival. This marked a significant turning point in her career, attracting attention and establishing her as a talented actress in the film industry.

Her success continued in 2016 when she received her second Crystal Simorgh for Best Supporting Actress for her performances in the films "Breath" and "Spare" at the 34th Fajr Film Festival.

In subsequent years, Moghaddami's contributions to the film industry have been consistently recognized through nominations and awards. She earned a Crystal Simorgh nomination for Best Supporting Actress for her role in the film "Abajan" at the 35th Fajr Film Festival in 2017. Additionally, she received a nomination for Best Leading Actress for her portrayal in the movie "Khejalat Nakesh" (Don't Be Embarrassed) in 2018.

Throughout the 2010s and 2020s, the "Lady of a Thousand Faces", consistently garnered critical acclaim with her roles and performances. Her talent and contributions to the film industry were widely acknowledged and celebrated by prestigious organizations, including the Association of Iranian Film Critics and Writers. She received multiple nominations and awards from this organization for her performances in films such as "Life and a Day," "Today," "Don't Be Embarrassed," "Abajan," and "When the Moon Was Full."

Shabnam Moghaddami is a prominent and influential figure in Iranian cinema. She is skilled in portraying characters with depth and authenticity, serving as an inspiration to aspiring actors in the country.

== Philanthropic and social engagement ==
In addition to her acting endeavors, Moghaddami actively engages in social and philanthropic activities. She is among the artists who have utilized the medium of staged readings to support underprivileged women, children with cancer, and earthquake survivors. As a member of the Barakat Charity Foundation, she contributes to the organization's efforts to provide staged readings for those in need.

She has also delivered a TED Talk (TEDx), where she openly shares her personal and challenging experiences, offering guidance to others facing similar obstacles. Her speeches aim to inspire hope and assist in finding a meaningful path in life.

Furthermore, she has leveraged her platform to raise awareness about significant social issues, utilizing her voice to inform the public. For instance, she is among the artists and cineastes who expressed their sympathy over the tragic deaths of passengers aboard a Ukrainian jetliner in posts published on social networks.

== Controversies ==
Moghaddami has faced controversies throughout her career. For instance, in 2021, during an appearance on the program "Hamrafigh," her spontaneous proposal to collaborate with the music group "Bomrani" and sing with them generated a significant reaction. Consequently, her appearance was unexpectedly removed from the Naava platform without explanation.

Additionally, in 2022, fifteen Iranian female actresses, including Shabnam Moghaddami, were the subject of a complaint filed by seminarians in Qom. The actresses were accused of violating public decency due to their attire in public spaces, gatherings, and personal Instagram pages. The complaint triggered extensive discussions on social media and in the press. Ultimately, the judiciary declared the complaint invalid and issued a non-prosecution order for the actresses involved.

== Filmography ==
"cinema and Television" (Actress)
Year	Title	Director	Role	Description	Ref
1997	Injured	Kamran Ghadakchian			
1999	Lost Dreams of Khajo	Reza Mahimani		Television film, IRIB TV1	
2000	From the Bottom of the Heart	Bahram Kazemi			
2001	Living	Reza Sobhani		This film was screened at the Tokyo Filmex Festival.	
2001	A Pleasant Journey	Afshin Sadeghi		Television film	
2005-2006	In the Name of the Father	Ebrahim Hatamikia	Doctor		
2006	Iranian Carpet	Jafar Panahi		Farsh-e Irani is a collection of 15 short films by various directors. Jafar Panahi's short film "Gerehgoshi" featuring Shabnam Moghaddami is one of them.	
2006	Nowruz Night Present	Vahid Nikkhah		Television film IRIB TV5	
2006-2007	The Reward of Silence	Maziar Miri			
2006-2007	There's Always a Woman in Between	Kamal Tabrizi			
2007	The Empty CLip	Mas'oud Abparvar		Television film, IRIB TV1	
2007	Shadows of Desire	Mohammad-Ebrahim Sultani		Television film, IRIB TV1	
2007-2008	Child of The Earth	MohammadAli Bashe-Ahangar			
2008	Shirin	Abbas Kiarostami		Moghaddami is one of the 113 actors who appear in this film.	
2008	Child and Angel	Ma'soud Naghashzadeh		Participation in the Iranian Film Festival in Hyderabad, India.	
2008	Secret	Saeed Asadi		Television film, IRIB TV1	
2008	Relationships	Iraj Karimi		Television film, IRIB TV1	
2008	The Song OF Palm Trees	Siamak Shayeghi		Television film	
2008	Mahboobeh	Vahid Nikkhah-Azad		Television film, participation in the 6th Children and Youth Film Festival in Madrid, Spain	
2009	The House Under the Water	Sepideh Farsi			
2009	Thirst	Kambiz Kashefi		Television film	
2010	A Short Story and Several Others	Hojat Ghasemzadeh-Asl		Television film	
2010	Chahar Harfi	Jamshid Mahmoudi		Television film	
2010	Faghat Bist	Mas'oud Keramati			
2010	The Report of a Feast	Ebrahim Hatamikia		Under investigation.	
2011	Kissing the Moon-Like Face	Homayoon Ass'adian	Tahereh	This film was broadcast on Radio Namayesh with radio adaptation and narration by Malekeh Shabanian.	
2011	Visible and Invisible	Hojat Ghasemzadeh-Asl		Television film, IRIB TV4	
2011	The Purple Clouds	Siamak Shayeghi			
2011	The Laboratory	Hamid Amjad			
2012	Acrid	Kiarash Asadizadeh		Winner of the Shavalian Knight Statue from the 2013 Rome Film Festival and successful participation in the Gothenburg Film Festival in Sweden, Kolkata Film Festival in India, Delhi Film Festival, Cambridge London, and Egypt. This film was publicly screened in Iran after 4 years.	
2012	Story of Me and My Father's Bicycle	Fayaz Moosavi		Television film, IRIB TV2	
2013	Block 9 Exit 2	Alireza Amini			
2013	Today	Reza MirKarimi		This film was submitted as Iran's representative in the Foreign Language Film category of the 87th Academy Awards.	
2015	Them	Ehsan Soltanian			
2015	Breath	Narges Abyar	uncle's wife		
2015	A Long Day	Babak Bahram-Beigi			
2015	Shadow	Mas'oud Navvabi			
2015	Life and a Day	Saeed Roustayi	Azam		
2015-2016	Spare	borzou niknejad		This film was produced in 1394 but was released in Iranian cinemas on 23 Tir 1395.	
2016	Chocolate	Sohail Movaffagh			
2016	Auntie Frog	Afshin Hashemi		comedy Musical Muppet movie	
2016	Oxidant	Hamed Mohammadi	Shohre		
2016	Abajan	Hatef Alimardani			
2016	Whooping Cough	Reza Tofigh-Jou		Short Film	
2017	Don't Be Embarrassed	Reza Maghsoudi	Sanam		
2017	Dressage	Pouya Badkoubeh			
2018	Farewell, Shirazi Girl	Afshin Hashemi			
2018	Columbus	Hatef Alimardani			
2018	Snake Venom	Javad Razavian			
2018	When the Moon Was Full	Narges Abyar	Asmat		
2019	Worker Bee	Afshin Sadeghi			
2019	Playing with Stars	Hatef Alimardani			
2021	At the End of the Day	Babak Bahram-Beygi		The film "Chehre Be Chehre" changed its name to "Dar Entehaye Rooz" at the request of Mehdi Kouhian, the film's producer, to the Cinema Organization.	
2021	Moon in the Fracture of Mirror	Elham Hesami		Documentary, Behind the Scenes of the Film When the Moon Was Full	
2022	Lawless City	Karim Amini			

=== Television & web series ===
TV Series (Actress)
Year	Title	Director	Broadcasting Network	Ref			
Year	Title	Director	Broadcasting Network	1997	Sunflowers	Mas'oud Shahmohammadi	IRIB TV1
1998	Fellow Students	Mas'oud Shahmohammadi; Ahmad Najibzadeh	IRIB TV1				
1998	Expectant	Asghar Farhadi	IRIB TV5				
1999	Tale of a City	Asghar Farhadi	IRIB TV5				
2000	Tea with Sugar Cubes	Naser Hashemi	IRIB TV2				
2001	What's New, Neighbor?	Behrouz Baghaei	IRIB TV2				
2002	Prospects	Arjang Amirfazli	IRIB TV1				
2003	Brother-in-laws	Farhad Aeesh	IRIB TV5				
2005	On Foot	Asghar Tavassoli	IRIB TV5				
2005	Night Road	Dariush Farhang	IRIB TV3				
2006	Under the Blade	Mohammad-Reza Honarmand	IRIB TV1				
2008	After Years	Akbar Khajooi	IRIB TV3				
2009	Chef	Mohammad-Reza Honarmand	IRIB TV1				
2010	Lead Stars	Mohammadreza Ahanj	IRIB TV2				
2011	Fall of an Angel	Bahram Bahramian	IRIB TV1 - Ramadan Special				
2011	Children are Watching	Hamidreza Salahmand	IRIB TV2 - Nowruz 1390				
2012	Jalal-ad Ddin	Shahram Asadi, Arash Moayerian	IRIB TV1 - Broadcast in 1393				
2014	Madinah	Sirus Moghadam	IRIB TV1 - Ramadan Special				
2014	Haft Sang	Alireza Bazrafshan	IRIB TV3 - Ramadan Special				
2016	Carousel	Azizollah Hamidnejad; Bahram Azimpour; Ehsan Abdipour	IRIB TV1				
2017	Agate	Behrang Tofighi	IRIB TV3 - Muharram Special				
2020	Doping	Reza Maghsoudi	IRIB TV3 - Nowruz Series				

Home video Streaming Network (Actress)
Year	Title	Director	Role	ref		
Year	Title	Director	2014	The Fool	Kamal Tabrizi	Parpar
2019	The Monster	Mehran Modiri	Shohre			
2021	Once Upon a Time in Iran	Tina Pakravan	Fakhro-al nesa			
2021	Ordinary People	Rambod Javan	Barbara Barazandeh			
2022	Women's Secret Network	Afshin Hashemi	Soltan			
2022	Innocent	Mehran Ahmadi	Forough Farshbaf			
2023	Vertigo	Behrang Tofighi	Parisa			
2023	Sedato	Hamed Javadzadeh	Judge			
2025	Jackal	Behrang Tofighi	Simin			

== Theater ==
Theater Performances (Actress)
Year	Title	Director	Venue	ref			
Year	Title	Director	Venue	1998	Paper House	Shahram Karami	Tehran, Ibn Sina Cultural Center
1999	City of Man, City of Animal	Shahram Karami	Tehran,City Theater of Tehran, Hall No.2				
1999	Three Years and 2/1	Amir Aghaei	Tehran,City Theater of Tehran, Hall No.2				
2000	The Unbelievable Story of Three Assassins	Banafsheh Tavanae	Tehran, City Theater of Tehran, Chahar Soo Hall				
2000	Namaki (Salty)	Babak tavassoli	Tehran, City Theater of Tehran, Ghashghaee Hall				
2001	Hotel Bride	Sima Tirandaz	Tehran, City Theater of Tehran, Hall No.2				
2001	Inspector	Alireza Koushk-Jalali	Tehran, City Theater of Tehran, Main Hall				
2003	Bridge	Mohammad Rahmaniyan	Tehran, City Theater of Tehran, Chahar Soo Hall				
2003	Close Encounter of the Last Kind	Sima Tirandaz	Tehran, City Theater of Tehran, Gheshghai Hall				
2003	Pilgrim	Hamid Amjad	Tehran, City Theater of Tehran, Chahar Soo Hall				
2003	The Woman Who Knew Too Much	AliReza Oliaee	Tehran, City Theater of Tehran, Hall No.2				
2004	Article 1133	Saeed Shapouri	Tehran, City Theater of Tehran, Sayeh Hall				
2004	Some Who Nobody Knew	Dariush Faezi	Tehran, Tamaashakhaneh Mehr				
2004	31/6/77	AliReza Nadari	Tehran, City Theater of Tehran, Chahar Soo Hall				
2004	Without Milk and Sugar	Hamid Amjad	Tehran, City Theater of Tehran, Ghashghaee Hall				
2004	The Door	AliReza Oliaee; AliMohammad Rahimi	Tehran, City Theater of Tehran, new Hall				
2004	At The Top of the Towers	Rahim Norouzi	Tehran, Molavi Hall				
2005	Suddenly Pigeon	Abbas Ghaffari	Tehran, City Theater of Tehran, New Hall; Germany, Theater an der Ruhr, Shab-haye Sepid Festival, 2006				
2005	My Childhood	Alireza Oliaee; Dariush Faezi	Tehran, Molavi Hall				
2005	Trakhis Case	Afshin Hashemi	Tehran, Molavi Hall				
2005	The Days that Passed by in Memory of You	Saeed Shapouri	Tehran, Theater City, Hall No.2				
2005	John The Baptiste	Saeed Shapouri	Tehran, City Theater of Tehran, Sayeh Hall				
2006	Jetstream of Dream	Azam Boroujerdi	Tehran, Molavi Hall				
2006	Sad Widows of Warlord	Hadi Amel	Tehran, City Theater of Tehran, New Hall				
2006	The Rope	AliMohammad Rahimi	Tehran, City Theater of Tehran, Sayah Hall				
2006	The Symphony of Pain	Hossein Pakdel	Tehran, City Theater of Tehran, Sayah Hall; Germany, Theater an der Ruhr, Silk Road Festival, 2007				
2006	Silence is My Heritage	AliReza Oliaee	Tehran, City Theater of Tehran, Hall No.2				
2006	Winter's Light	Saeed Shapouri	Tehran, City Theater of Tehran, Sayah Hall				
2007	Sheer Madness	Jalal Tehrani	Not performed				
2007	Restlessness	Saeed Shapouri	Germany, Theater an der Ruhr, Silk Road Festival, 2008				
2007	Seventh Seal	Saeed Shapouri	Tehran, City Theater of Tehran, Ghashghai Hall				
2008-2009	Terminal	Siamak Ehsaee	Tehran, City Theater of Tehran, Qashqai; Germany, Theater an der Ruhr, Silk Road Festival: 2008				
2009	MOTHER iS HERE	Nima Dehghan, Hamid Azarang	Tehran, City Theater of Tehran, Chahar Soo Hall; Germany, Theater an der Ruhr,				
2009	Cuckoo of the Shrine Pigeons	Alireza Naderi	Tehran, Iranian Artists Forum, Beethoven Hall				
2010	Merciless Killer, Hesse Karlson	Mas'oud Rayegan	Tehran, Iranshahr Theater, Samandarian Hall				
2010	East is East!	Mas'oud Rayegan	Tehran, Iranshahr Theater				
2011	Garden of Death	Siamak Ehsaee	Tehran, Iranshahr Theater, Samandarian Hall				
2011	Letters to Teb	Siamak Ehsaee	Tehran, Iranshahr Theater				
2012	Fly Into the Darkness	Afshin Hashemi	Tehran, Av Theater				
2015	Tunnel	Siamak Ehsaee	Tehran, Baran Theater				
2019	My Seagull	Keyomars Moradi	Tehran, Iranshahr Theater				

Staged Readings (Actress)
Year	Title	Writer	Director	Venue	Ref				
Year	Title	Writer	Director	Venue	2002	All Things Considered	Ben Brown	Sima Tirandaz	Tehran, City Theater of Tehran
Halfway Up the Tree	Peter Ustinov	Ala Mohseni	Tehran, City Theater of Tehran		2002				
2004	Kangaroo	Alireza Mohammadi	Alireza Mohammadi	Tehran, Niavaran Cultural center, Gousheh Hall					
2008	Tsunami	Saeed Shapouri	Saeed Shapouri	Tehran, Niavaran Cultural center, Gousheh Hall					
2013	Where is the Capital of Rio de Janeiro?	Nima Dehghani	Nima Dehghani	Arasbaran Cultural Center					
2015	Five Women's Romantic Narratives	Naziar Omrani	Naziar Omrani	Ibn Sina Cultural Center					

== Awards and nominations ==
Festival/Award	Year	Title of Work	Category	Result	Ref
International Children & Youth Theater Festival-hamedan	2000	Namaki (Play)	First Prize for Best Actress	Won	
Iran's Traditional and Ritual Theatre Festival	2003	Pilgrim (play)	Honorary Diploma for Best Actress	Won	
Moon Theater Festival	2004	Some Who Nobody Knew	First Prize for Best Actress	Won	
3rd Iran's Theater Forum Association	2006	Suddenly Pigeon	best actress	Won	
6th Iran's Theater Forum Association	2009	Cuckoo of the Shrine Pigeons	best actress	Won	
30th Fajr International Film Festival	2012	Kissing the Moon-Like Face	Best Supporting Actress	Nominated	
32nd Fajr International Film Festival	2014	Today	Best Supporting Actress	Won	
3rd Jam-e-Jam Television Festival	2014	Story of Me and My Dad's Bicycle	Best Actress	Won	
8th Iranian Film Critics and Writers Association	2014	Today	Best Supporting Actress	Nominated	
34th Fajr International Film Festival	2016	Breath and Spare	Best Supporting Actress	Won	
15th Hafez Awards	2015	Haft Sang	Best Comedy Actress	Nominated	
15th Hafez Awards	2015	Medina	Best Drama Actress	Won	
10th Iranian Film Critics and Writers Association	2016	Life and One Day	Best Supporting Actress	Nominated	
10th Iranian Film Critics and Writers Association	2016	Breath	Best Supporting Actress	Won	
35th Fajr International Film Festival	2017	Abajan	Best Supporting Actress	Nominated	
11th Iranian Film Critics and Writers Association	2017	Abajan	Best Supporting Actress	Nominated	
36th Fajr International Film Festival	2018	Don't Be Embarrassed	Best Leading Actress	Nominated	
12th Iranian Film Critics and Writers Association	2018	Don't Be Embarrassed	Best Leading Actress	Nominated	
13th Iranian Film Critics and Writers Association	2019	When the Moon Was Full	Best Supporting Actress	Nominated	
19th Hafez Awards	2019	Don't Be Embarrassed	Best Comedy Actress	Won	
13th Iranian Film Critics and Writers Association	2019	When the Moon Was Full	Best Supporting Actress	Nominated	
20th Hafez Awards	2020	The Monster	Best Comedy Actress	Won	
