= Track 143 =

- Directed by: Narges Abyar
- Written by: Narges Abyar
- Produced by: Abuzar Pourmohammadi
- Starring: Merila Zarei; Mehran Ahmadi; Gelareh Abbasi; Javad Ezzati
- Music by: Masoud Sekhavatdoust
- Release date: 2014
- Running time: 98 minutes
- Country: Iran
- Language: Persian

Track 143 (Persian: شيار143, translit. Shiyar 143) is a 2014 Iranian drama film directed and written by Narges Abyar and produced by Abuzar Pourmohammadi and Mohammad Hossein Ghasemi.

== Cast ==
- Merila Zarei as Olfat
- Mehran Ahmadi as Seyed Ali Beman
- Saman Safari as Yunos
- Gelare Abbasi as Ferdows
- Javad Ezzati as Shahrokh
- Zahra Moradi as Ahi Jan
- Yadullah Shadmani as a telephone operator

== Awards ==
- 2014 - Merila Zarei won the Crystal Simorgh for Best Actress at the 32nd Fajr International Film Festival
- 2014 - Merila Zarei was highly commended in the Best Performance by an Actress category at the 2014 Asia Pacific Screen Awards
- 2016 - Narges Abyar won the Women Film Maker's Section Award for Best Feature at the 2016 Dhaka International Film Festival

== See also ==
- Breath (2016 film)
- When the Moon Was Full
