= 2019 Shanghai International Film Festival =

Chinese film festival

- Location: Shanghai, China

The 2019 Shanghai International Film Festival was the 22nd such festival devoted to international cinema held in Shanghai, China.

== International Jury ==
The members of the jury for the Golden Goblet Award were:

- President: Nuri Bilge Ceylan (Turkish director)
- Paolo Genovese (Italian director)
- Zhao Tao (Chinese actress)
- Aleksey German Jr. (Russian director)
- Nicolas Celis (Mexican producer )
- Wang Jingchun (Chinese actor)

Documentary Film Jury:

- President: Viktor Kossakovsky (Russian director)
- Zhou Hao (Chinese director of The Chinese Mayor)
- Isabelle Arrate Fernandez (Danish producer of 5 Broken Camera)

Animation Jury:

- President: Tomm Moore (Irish director)

Short Film Jury:

- President: Raul Garcia (American director of Extraordinary Tales)

== In Competition ==
=== Drama ===
English title	Director(s)	Production country	Notes
Brotherhood	Pavel Lungin	Russia	
Castle of Dreams	Reza Mirkarimi	Iran	
Escape From Town (Chicuarotes)	Gael García Bernal	Mexico	
God Helps My Friends (Il Grande Spirito)	Sergio Rubini	Italy	
Between Breaths (Inhale-Exhale)	Dito Tsintsadze	Georgia/ Russia/ Sweden	
Lane 4 (Raia 4)	Emiliano Cunha	Brazil	
A Serenade	Rikiya Imaizumi	Japan	
Many Happy Returns	Carlos A. Morelli	Germany	
Dream Ballet (Pacarrete)	Allan Deberton	Brazil	
Homesickness	Qin Hailu	China	
Rosa	Katja Colja	Italy / Slovenia	
Guardian of Light and Shadow	Yermek Tursunov	Kazakhstan	
Spring Tide	Yang Lina	China	
Trees Under the Sun	Dr. Biju	India	
Dangerous/Vortex	Jacky Gan	China	

=== Documentary ===
English title	Director(s)	Production country	Notes
Bridges of Time	Kristīne Briede, Audrius Stonys	Latvia / Lithuania / Estonia	
The Fourth Kingdom	Adán Aliaga, Àlex Lora	Spain	
It's All Good	Tuki Jencquel	Venezuela / Germany	
Fire of Silence	Federico Arteaga	Columbia	
Dali's Voice/The Sound of Dali	Zhang Yang	China	

=== Animation ===
English title	Director(s)	Country	Notes
Dilili in Paris	Michel Ocelot	France	
Lotte and the Lost Dragons	Janno Põldma	Estonia	
Louis & Luca - Mission to the Moon	Rasmus A. Sivertsen	Norway	
Ride Your Wave	Masaaki Yuasa	Japan	
Spycies	Zhiyi Zhang, Guillaume Ivernel	China	

=== Short film ===
==== Live Action ====
English title	Director(s)	Production country	Notes
A Brief Dream	Geng De	China	
Dissect	Siavash Shahabi	Iran	
Harbor	Paul Marques Duarte	France	
Gretel's Trick	Milena Aboyan	Germany	
mother	Pariched Sen	Nepal	
Nowhere to Place	Han Jingzhi	China	
Three Days of Klava	Ivan Grigolyunas	Russia	
Dream of Lock (The Nightmare)	Liu Jingyu	China	
Homecoming	Zhou Yiran	China	
Videotape	Sandra Concepcion Reynoso Estrada	Mexico	

==== Animated ====
English title	Director(s)	Production country	Notes
Harvest (Qiushi)	SUN Lijun	China	
King of the Brood	ZHANG Zige	China	
Ferris Wheel	Carlos Baena	Spain	
Cat Adventures (Teofrastus)	Sergei Kibus	Estonia	
Counterclockwise (Widdershins)	Simon P. Biggs	United Kingdom	

== Award winners ==
=== Golden Goblet Awards ===
- Best Feature Film: Castle of Dreams (Iran)
- Jury Grand Prix: Inhale-Exhale, Georgia/Russia/Sweden
- Best Director: Reza Mirakarimi for Castle of Dreams
- Best Actor: (tie) Chang Feng for The Return and Hamed Behdad for Castle of Dreams
- Best Actress: Salome Demuria for Inhale-Exhale
- Best Screenplay: Aleksander Lungin & Pavel Lungin for Brotherhood (Russia)
- Best Cinematography: Jake Pollock for Spring Tide
- Outstanding Artistic Achievement: Trees Under the Sun (India)
- Best Documentary: Bridge of Time
- Best Animated Movie: Ride Your Wave (Japan)
- Best Animated Short: La Noria (Spain)
- Best Live Action Short: Nowhere To Put(China)

=== Asian New Talent Awards ===
- Best Film: To Live To Sing
- Best Director: Yuko Hakota for Blue Hour
- Best Script Writer: Yusuf Radjamuda for Mountain Song
- Best Cinematographer:
- Best Actor:
- Best Actress:

=== Jackie Chan Action Movie Awards ===
Moved away from SIFF to become its own event on July 21, 2019.

== Notable Attendees ==
Notable attendees of the festival include William Feng, Ng See-yuen, TIFF director Takeo Hisamatsu and CFF director Thierry Fremaux and Amanda Seyfried.
