= Castle of Dreams (2019 film) =

- Film poster
- Directed by: Reza Mirkarimi
- Written by: Mohammad Davoudi; Mohsen Gharaie
- Produced by: Reza Mirkarimi
- Starring: Hamed Behdad; Zhila Shahi; Yuna Tadayyon; Niousha Alipour; Babak Lotfi Khajepasha
- Cinematography: Morteza Hodaei
- Edited by: Reza Mirkarimi
- Music by: Amin Honarmand
- Release dates: 1 February 2019 (Fajr Film Festival); 16 June 2019 (Shanghai International Film Festival); 24 July 2019 (Iran)
- Country: Iran
- Language: Persian
- Box office: 3.4 billion toman (Iran)

Castle of Dreams (Persian: قصر شیرین) is a 2019 Iranian drama film directed by Reza Mirkarimi and written by Mohammad Davoudi and Mohsen Gharaie. The film screened for the first time at the 37th Fajr Film Festival and was released on July 24, 2019, in Iran theatrically.

== Cast ==
- Hamed Behdad as Jalal
- Zhila Shahi as Najmeh
- Niousha Alipour as Sara
- Yuna Tadayyon as Ali
- Azadeh Nobahari as Nasrin
- Akbar Aein as Behrouz
- Mohammad Ashkanfar as Flower Seller
- Zoheyr Yari as Shirin's brother
- Mohammad Asgari as Car Buyer
- Babak Lotfi Khajepasha as Police Officer
- Mohammad Asgari as Fotoohi
- Emre Tetikel as Mohammed

== Reception ==
=== Awards and nominations ===
Year	Award	Category	Recipient	Result
2019	Fajr Film Festival	Best Film	Reza Mirkarimi	Nominated
2019	Fajr Film Festival	Best Director	Reza Mirkarimi	Nominated
2019	Fajr Film Festival	Best Screenplay	Mohammad Davoudi, Mohsen Gharaie	Won
2019	Fajr Film Festival	Best Original Score	Amin Honarmand	Won
2019	Fajr Film Festival	Best Actor	Hamed Behdad	Nominated
2019	Fajr Film Festival	Best Supporting Actress	Zhila Shahi	Nominated
2019	Fajr Film Festival	Best Supporting Actress	Niousha Alipour	Nominated
2019	Fajr Film Festival	Best Supporting Actor	Yuna Tadayyon	Nominated
2019	Asia Pacific Screen Awards	Best Screenplay	Mohammad Davoudi, Mohsen Gharaie	Nominated
2019	Asian Film Awards	Best Actor	Hamed Behdad	Nominated
2019	Asian Film Awards	Best Screenplay	Mohammad Davoudi, Mohsen Gharaie	Nominated
2019	Shanghai International Film Festival	Best Film	Reza Mirkarimi	Won
2019	Shanghai International Film Festival	Best Director	Reza Mirkarimi	Won
2019	Shanghai International Film Festival	Best Actor	Hamed Behdad	Won
2019	Antalya Golden Orange Film Festival	Best Actor	Hamed Behdad	Won
2019	Antalya Golden Orange Film Festival	Best Director	Reza Mirkarimi	Won
2019	Antalya Golden Orange Film Festival	Best Film	Reza Mirkarimi	Nominated
2020	Hafez Awards	Best Film	Reza Mirkarimi	Nominated
2020	Hafez Awards	Best Director	Reza Mirkarimi	Nominated
2020	Hafez Awards	Best Screenplay	Mohammad Davoudi, Mohsen Gharaie	Nominated
2020	Hafez Awards	Best Actor	Hamed Behdad	Nominated
2020	Hafez Awards	Best Cinematography	Morteza Hedayat	Nominated
2019	Iran's Film Critics and Writers Association	Best Film	Reza Mirkarimi	Nominated
2019	Iran's Film Critics and Writers Association	Best Director	Reza Mirkarimi	Nominated
2019	Iran's Film Critics and Writers Association	Best Screenplay	Mohammad Davoudi, Mohsen Gharaie	Honorary Diploma
2019	Iran's Film Critics and Writers Association	Best Actor	Hamed Behdad	Won
2019	Iran's Film Critics and Writers Association	Best Actress	Zhila Shahi	Nominated
2019	Iran's Film Critics and Writers Association	Best Supporting Actress	Niousha Alipour	Nominated
2019	Iran's Film Critics and Writers Association	Best Original Score	Amin Honarman	Nominated
2021	Iranian Film Festival Australia	Best Film	Reza Mirkarimi	Won
2021	Iranian Film Festival Australia	Best Screenplay	Mohammad Davoudi, Mohsen Gharaie	Won
2021	Iranian Film Festival Australia	Best Actor	Hamed Behdad	Won
2021	Iranian Film Festival Australia	Best Actress	Zhila Shahi	Won
