= Narges Abyar =

Iranian film director, author, and screenwriter

- نرگس آبیار
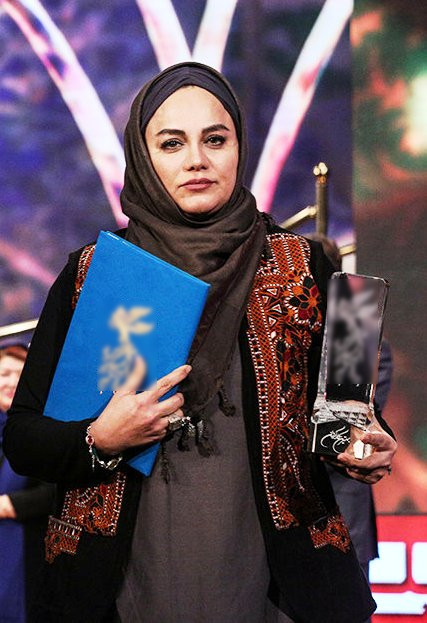
- Abyar at the 37th Fajr Film Festival
- Born: 8 August 1970 (age 56); Tehran, Iran
- Occupations: Author, film director, screen writer
- Years active: 1996–present
- Spouse: Mohammad Hossein Ghasemi

Narges Abyar (Persian: نرگس آبیار, also romanized as Narges Ābyār; born 8 August 1970) is an Iranian film director, author, and screenwriter, best known for directing Track 143, Breath, and When the Moon Was Full. The film Track 143 is adapted from Abyar's novel titled The Third Eye narrating the story of a woman and her son during the time of war. Her films sensitively picture the sufferings of women and children caused by the society, war or radicalism.

Abyar graduated in Persian literature; she started writing books in 1997. So far, she has written over 30 story and fiction books for children, young adults, and adults.

== Biography ==
Abyar graduated in Persian literature; she has written several story and fiction books for children, young adults, and adults. She began her directing career with the film Objects in Mirror Are Closer than They Appear in 2005 and some short films and documentaries, most of them about the Iran–Iraq War.

Although she has written four drama films, she has also made several short and feature-length documentaries since 2005. Her first experience in fiction was “The Kind Dead-End,” the winner of the best short film of the Setayesh Festival, and in several international festivals were also presented for the competition section.

== Personal life ==
Abyar is married to producer Mohammad Hossein Ghasemi.

== Filmography ==
=== Film ===
Year	Title	Ref.
2014	Track 143	
2015	Objects in Mirror Are Closer than They Appear	
2016	Breath	
2019	When the Moon Was Full	
2021	Pinto	

=== Web ===
Year	Title	Platform	Ref.
2025	Savushun	Sheyda	
2025–2026	Drunkard Morning	Sheyda	

=== Documentary ===
- The Kind Dead-End (fiction, 15 min, 2006)
- The Story of a Believable Story (fiction, 2007)
- One Day After the 10th Day; winner of the Best Documentary of the Egyptian Ismaili Festival; Grand Prize of the Batumi Festival, Georgia; Cinematic Success Award for AZA Festival, Greece; Honor Diploma from the Iguana Festival, Italy; The Best Documentary of the Ashura Image Contest and Participating in the 35 World Festivals
- The Day of the End (documentary, 2008); The Best Documentary of the Semi-Long; Film of Cinema Verite Festival; Best Documentary Award for Ashura Art Mourning Festival
- Mother of the City (documentary, 2008); Best Film Award and Best Semi-long Script of Yazd Sacrificial Festival
- Ulcer (Nasur) (fiction, 2009); Best Short Film Festival of the Holy Defense Festival; Best Film Festival for Three Decades of Presence
- Shirpooshan (documentary, 2010 ); nominee for Best Documentary Award for the Grand Ave Festival, Poland

== Books ==
Some of her novels are:

- Mountain on the shoulder of the tree (Kooh rooye shaneh-ha-ye derakht); Winner of the Best Sacred Defense 2004 novel
- A Boy with insatiable worms on his body (Pesar-e kerm be doosh & khandagh-e balaa); Literary Prize of Isfahan & Selected Top Book Festival
- Third Eye (Cheshm-e sevvom); Nominated for the Best Sacred Defense 2006 Novel
- The Legend of A Skinny Spring (Afsaneh-ye cheshmeh-ye laghar-mordani); Winner of the Nobel Prize of Salambacheha & Winner of the Literary Writers
- It was neither a day nor night (Na shab bood-o na rooz); Lady Cultural Literary Award
- The Poems of a sky-clad fish (She'r-ha-ye yek mahi-ye siyah-e asemoon-jol); Selected in Top Book Festival
- Story of Two Fives (Dastan-e do panj); Selected in Top Book Festival
- The Agitated Existence of a Prosperous (Zendegi-ye ghambar-e yek bot-e khoshbakht)

== See also ==
- List of female film directors
