= Spycies =

2019 Chinese-French animated spy film

- Film poster
- Traditional Chinese: 动物特工局
- Directed by: Guillaume Ivernel; Zhiyi Zhang
- Screenplay by: Stéphane Carraz; Michel Pagès; Zhiyi Zhang
- Produced by: Zuo Qinshu
- Production companies: iQIYI Motion Pictures; Lux Populi Production; Lux Populi VFX; Tianrui Pai Ming culture media co, LTD; Beijing Chase Film; Jungler
- Distributed by: Particular Crowd
- Release dates: 14 June 2019 (Annecy); 11 January 2020 (China)
- Running time: 99 minutes
- Countries: China; France
- Languages: French; Mandarin; English
- Budget: $20 million
- Box office: $6.99 million (international)

Spycies (Chinese: 动物特工局) is a 2019 animated science fiction spy film directed by Guillaume Ivernel and Zhiyi Zhang. It was funded by iQIYI Motion Pictures and produced by Lux Populi. The film is a Chinese-French co-production and premiered at the Annecy International Animation Film Festival on 14 June 2019 and at the Shanghai International Film Festival in China on 17 June 2019 (where it was nominated for Best Animated Feature) before being theatrically released in China on 11 January 2020. The title is a pun on "species".

== Synopsis ==
In years 2300, special agent cat Vladimir Willis is not good at obeying orders, so he is sent on a disciplinary assignment to a remote off-shore platform to guard a top-secret cargo, accompanied with timid rookie rat Hector. But when a gang of mysterious figures break into the platform and steal the cargo, Vladimir and Hector must retrieve the cargo.

== Voice cast ==
- Kirk Thornton as Vladimir, an chartreux cat who works as a secret agent, the main protagonist.
- Dino Andrade as Hector, a lazy but timid rat who accompanies Vladmir.
- Karen Strassman as Chloe, a rabbit nurse whom Vladimir had a crush on. She is later revealed to be a secret agent near the film's climax.
- Salli Saffioti as Mia, a bee actress.
- Jamieson Price as Doc, an grizzly bear scientist and as Kotor, an old hairless woolly mammoth who was rescued from extinction by Doc and plans to get revenge on him with the name of "The Demon of the Cold", the main antagonist.
- Lauren Alexandre-Lasseur as Melissa, a female woolly mammoth.
- Debi Derryberry as Melinda a female hippopotamus, Jim a green snake who transforms into a dragon simply by drinking coffee, a mentally handicapped chicken, a pig salesman, and a giraffe nurse.
- Barbara Goodson as Antiques Sellers, a giant purple spider who works as a hospital attendant.
- David Lodge as Eddie, a tree frog reporter, Dr. Oxford the Snub-nosed monkey, mole patient, mole doctor, Mike the alligator, a parrot and Thunderbolt a criminal leopard.

== Production ==
In Dragon Hunters, director Guillaume Ivernel developed semi-realistic choices for the characters that integrated into textured and photo-realistic universes. This style offers the viewer an image at the crossroads of animation and live action.

Over 250 to 300 people worked on the film. The character designs, modelling were done in France at the Lux Populi studios in Paris using Maya software. With some parts of the rendering being done at another studio in Paris Les Androids Associés. Parts of the screenplay was designed by the French team, with the film's animation being done back in France at Jungler along with the modeling of some characters, in China, Lux Populi's facilities in Beijing did the rest alongside financing and post production.

== Release ==
Spycies premiered at the Annecy International Animation Film Festival in France on 14 June 2019 and at the Shanghai International Film Festival in China on 17 June 2019, before being theatrically released in China on 11 January 2020. It grossed 128 million yuan, becoming the second highest-grossing animated film of 2020 in China and the seventeenth highest-grossing animated film in China overall.

=== Critical reception ===
The film received generally positive reviews in China, but received more negative reviews internationally. On review aggregator Rotten Tomatoes, the film holds an approval rating of 43% based on seven critical reviews.

== See also ==
- List of Chinese animated films
