= Afshin Azizi =

Iranian composer and musician

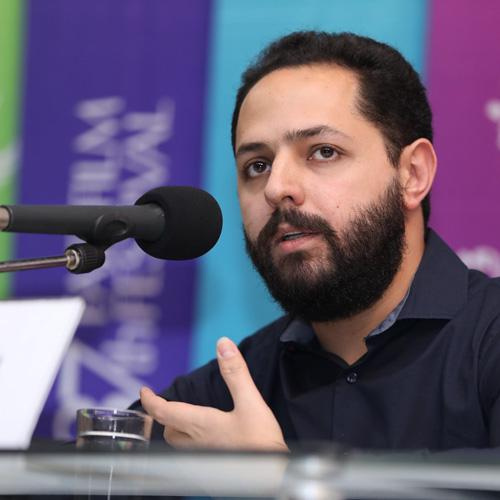
- Afshin Azizi in Fajr Film Festival

Background information
- Genres: Film score, television music, documentary, animation, electronic, Traditional
- Occupations: Composer; Musician; Sound engineer
- Years active: 2008–present

Afshin Azizi (Persian: افشین عزیزی) is an Iranian composer and musician, known for his work in film, television, and documentary scoring.

== Career ==
Azizi's professional career began in Iranian television; his first score was written for the series Khatereh Fardā (2008). He later composed the soundtrack for the hit drama series Paria (2016). Following Paria, Azizi worked on several television productions, including Anaam (2017–2018) under director Javad Afshar, Matador (2013), Gasht-e Vijeh (2016) and Khab-Zadeh (2019).

In cinema, Azizi has composed scores for feature films such as Abajan (2017), There Will Be Blood on Wednesday (2015), Dying in September (2014), Starless Dreams (2016), and the biographical drama Gholamreza Takhti (2019). His score for Gholamreza Takhti earned him a nomination for Best Original Score at the 37th Fajr Film Festival and the Hafez Awards.

Azizi has also worked in documentary and art-house cinema. He composed the score for Finding Farideh (2018), Iran's official submission for the Best International Feature Film category at the 92nd Academy Awards. His score for this film won Best Original Music at the 11th Cinéma Vérité (Iran International Documentary Festival) in 2017. Azizi has scored numerous other documentaries, such as A House for You (2019) and Writing Hawa (2024), the latter premiering at the International Documentary Festival Amsterdam (IDFA).

Beyond film and television, Azizi has released several singles, including "Shouting at the Wind" (2023), "Nobody Is Waiting for You" (2023), "Jangale Asfalt (Titraj Payani) [feat. Arash Azizi]" (2024), "Sistan" (2024), and "Ashes of a Dream" (2025). He has collaborated with leading Iranian directors such as Hossein Soheili Zadeh, Javad Afshar, Bahram Tavakoli, and acclaimed documentary filmmakers like Kourosh Ataee and Azadeh Moussavi. He also served as a sound engineer for the album "The Lords of The Secrets," a collaboration between Sohrab Pournazeri and Homayoun Shajarian.

== Awards and honors ==
- 2017 – Cinema Vérité Iran International Documentary Festival: Best Original Music for Finding Farideh
- 2019 – 37th Fajr Film Festival: Nominee, Best Original Score for Gholamreza Takhti
- 2019 – Hafez Awards: Nominee, Best Original Score for Gholamreza Takhti

== Selected works ==
Film Scores:

- Dying in September (film, 2014)
- Paria (TV series, 2016)
- Starless Dreams (film, 2016)
- Abajan (film, 2017)
- Anaam (TV series, 2017–2018)
- Finding Farideh (documentary, 2018)
- Gholamreza Takhti (film, 2019)
- A House for You (documentary, 2019)
- In the Shadow of the Cypress (animation, 2023)
- Writing Hawa (documentary, 2024)

Singles:

- "Shouting at the Wind" (2023)
- "Nobody Is Waiting for You" (2023)
- "Jangale Asfalt (Titraj Payani) [feat. Arash Azizi]" (2024)
- "Sistan" (2024)
- "Ashes of a Dream" (2025)

== See also ==
- List of Iranian musicians
- Cinema of Iran
- Music of Iran
