= Chicuarotes =

2019 film

- Film poster
- Directed by: Gael García Bernal
- Written by: Augusto Mendoza
- Produced by: Gael García Bernal; Marta Núñez Puerto
- Starring: Daniel Giménez Cacho
- Cinematography: Juan Pablo Ramírez
- Edited by: Sebastián Sepúlveda
- Music by: Leonardo Heiblum; Jacobo Lieberman
- Distributed by: Cinépolis Distribución
- Release date: 16 May 2019 (Shanghai IFF)
- Running time: 95 minutes
- Country: Mexico
- Language: Spanish

Chicuarotes is a 2019 Mexican drama film directed by Gael García Bernal. It was screened in the Contemporary World Cinema section at the 2019 Toronto International Film Festival. It was selected for competition at the 2019 Shanghai International Film Festival.

== Cast ==
- Daniel Giménez Cacho as Chillamil
- Dolores Heredia as Tonchi
- Ricardo Abarca as Planchado
- Benny Emmanuel as Cagalera
- Enoc Leaño as Baturro
- Leidi Gutiérrez as Sugheili
- Gabriel Carbajal as Moloteco
- Pedro Joaquín as Víctor
- Esmeralda Ortiz as Güily
- Saúl Mercado as Karina
- Luis Enrique Basurto as Churrizo

== Plot ==
Two teenagers, Cagalera and Moloteco, live in San Gregorio Atlapulco, a poor neighborhood in Mexico City. They want a better life and try different ways to escape poverty.

They first appear dressed as clowns on a city bus, telling jokes and trying to earn money. When the passengers don’t pay, they pull a gun to force them.

Cagalera lives with his mother, younger sister, and gay brother. His mother is in a relationship with Baturro, an abusive drunk who dominates the household. Cagalera dreams of leaving the town with his girlfriend, Sugehili, who works as a hairdresser.

Cagalera convinces Moloteco to help with a robbery plan organized by Planchado, a local hustler. They try to rob a lingerie shop owned by Planchado’s girlfriend, but upon finding no money in the store, they leave with only lingerie. As they leave the scene in a car, they’re caught by two female police officers who recognize Planchado. He had rejected their advances in the past. The officers let Cagalera and Moloteco go, taking Planchado with them.

The boys' actions grow more serious when they decide to kidnap the young son of the local butcher. They hope to get ransom money and use it to change their lives. The whole town is looking for the kidnappers, including Chillamil, a friend of the butcher's and a feared ex-convict recently released from prison.

Their plan goes awry when Sugehili finds Moloteco alone with the boy and convinces him to let the boy go, making the boy promise not to say who kidnapped him. Cagalera and Moloteco decide to flee before the town finds them out, deciding to steal some money that Baturro has stored at Cagalera's home before the leave. Baturro catches them and beats Cagalera badly.

The butcher is still determined to find out who the kidnappers are, and in front of an angry group of locals, he asks his son to identify the kidnappers. The son points to the hills, implying that it was someone from another pueblo. A mob begins forming, planning violent retribution. Meanwhile, Cagalera's mother kills Baturro by mixing something in his drink.

The mob takes off into the hills and Chillamil takes Cagalera, Cagalera's brother, Moloteco, and Sugehili up to a roof top, pointing a gun at them and telling them he knows what they did. He asks Cagalera and Moloteco to hold Sugehili down so he can rape her. Cagalera's brother creates a distraction and Cagalera and Moloteco attack Chillamil. Chillamil gets shot in the chaos, but before he dies, he grabs his gun and fatally shoot Moloteco.

Cagalera and Sugehili flee the scene and decide to run away together. As they plan their escape, they talk about starting over somewhere else—places like Mazatlán, Acapulco, Tijuana, or even Las Vegas. However, Sugehili has a change of heart and walks away from Cagalera, in silence.
