= Symphony No. 9 (film) =

2019 Iranian film

- Film poster
- Persian: سمفونی نهم
- Directed by: Mohammad-Reza Honarmand
- Written by: Mohammad-Reza Honarmand; Hamed Afzali
- Produced by: Zeinab Taghvaei
- Starring: Hamid Farrokhnezhad; Sareh Bayat; Mohammad-Reza Foroutan; Alireza Kamali; Pejman Bazeghi
- Cinematography: Houman Behmanesh
- Edited by: Mohammad-Reza Moueini
- Music by: Amin Honarmand
- Release date: 3 February 2019 (Fajr Film Festival)
- Country: Iran
- Language: Persian

Symphony No. 9 (Persian: سمفونی نهم, Romanized: 'Samfoni-ye nohom') is a 2019 Iranian film written by Mohammad-Reza Honarmand and Hamed Afzali, produced by Zeinab Taghvaei, and directed by Mohammad-Reza Honarmand, starring Hamid Farrokhnezhad, Sareh Bayat, and Mohammad Reza Foroutan. The film premiered at the 37th Fajr Film Festival in February 2019.

== Cast ==
- Hamid Farrokhnezhad as a Malak al-Maut
- Sareh Bayat as Rahil
- Mohammad-Reza Foroutan as Kambiz Amini / Bardia Amini
- Alireza Kamali as Cyrus the Great
- Mehrdad Sedighian as Bardiya
- Hoda Zeinolabedin as Rabia Balkhi
- Dariush Reshadat as Hares
- Pouria Tehrani as Bektash
- Pejman Bazeghi as Amir Kabir
- Elham Nami as Ezzat ed-Dowleh
- Hassan Shirzad as Haj Ali Khan Farashbashi
- Hamidreza Molana as Adolf Hitler
- Marene Van Holk as Eva Braun
- Manoochehr Azar as Senior Malak al-Maut
