= Just 6.5 =

2019 film

- Film poster
- Directed by: Saeed Roustaee
- Written by: Saeed Roustaee
- Produced by: Jamal Sadatian
- Starring: Payman Maadi; Navid Mohammadzadeh; Parinaz Izadyar; Farhad Aslani
- Cinematography: Hooman Behmanesh
- Edited by: Bahram Dehghan
- Music by: Peyman Yazdanian
- Distributed by: Boshra Film
- Release date: 14 March 2019
- Running time: 131 minutes
- Country: Iran
- Language: Persian

Just 6.5 (Persian: متری شیش و نیم, romanized: Metri Shesh-o Nim transl. Six and a Half per Meter) also titled as Law of Tehran is a 2019 Iranian thriller drama film written and directed by Saeed Roustaee. It was well received by critics at the 76th Venice Film Festival, and won multiple awards, including the Crystal Simorgh for Audience Choice of Best Film, at the 37th Fajr Film Festival.

== Plot ==
Samad (Payman Maadi) is a narcotics detective in pursuit of a shadow drug kingpin Naser Khakzad (Navid Mohammadzadeh). One day a raid leads to capturing a low level dealer who leads to a bigger fish, who is somehow connected to the notorious drug lord.

== Cast ==
- Payman Maadi as Samad
- Navid Mohammadzadeh as Naser Khakzad
- Parinaz Izadyar as Elham
- Farhad Aslani as Judge
- Houman Kiai as Hamid
- Maziar Seyedi as Misagh Ashkani
- Hojjat Hassanpour as Sajjad
- Abolfazl Heidari as Amir ali
- Ali Bagheri as Reza Moradi
- Marjan Ghamari as Reza Moradi's wife

== Release ==
The film was screened at the 37th Fajr Film Festival, but had to be rescheduled because of technical difficulties in showing the film on the first day. Writing for website Eye for Film, Anton Bitel called the film "grim state-of-the-nation commentary" on Iranian society.

Following its UK release on digital platforms, Law of Tehran (aka Just 6.5) was made available to buy and rent on US and Canadian digital platforms from Tuesday April 11, 2023.

== Reception ==
=== Critical response ===
On review aggregator Rotten Tomatoes, the film holds an approval rating of 95% based on 20 reviews, with an average rating of 9/10.

=== Awards ===
Year	Award	Category	Nominated	Result
2019	Tokyo International Film Festival	Best Director	Saeed Roustaee	Won
2019	Tokyo International Film Festival	Best Actor	Navid Mohammadzadeh	Won
2019	Tokyo International Film Festival	Tokyo Grand Prix	Saeed Roustaee	Nominated
2019	Asia Pacific Screen Awards	Asia Pacific Screen Award	Navid Mohammadzadeh	Nominated
2019	Chicago International Film Festival	Gold Hugo	Saeed Roustaee	Nominated
2019	Venice Film Festival	Venice Horizons Award	Saeed Roustaee	Nominated
2019	São Paulo International Film Festival	New Directors Competition	Saeed Roustaee	Nominated
2019	Minsk International Film Festival "Listapad"	Victor Turov Memorial Award for Best Film	Saeed Roustaee	Nominated
2019	Stockholm Film Festival	Impact Award	Saeed Roustaee	Nominated
2020	Festival International du Film Indépendant de Bordeaux	Best Film	Saeed Roustaee	Won
2020	2nd Chungju International Martial Arts and Action Film Festival	Special Jury Award	Saeed Roustaee	Won
2020	Zurich Film Festival	Special Mention	Saeed Roustaee	Won
2020	Zurich Film Festival	Golden Eye	Saeed Roustaee	Nominated
2020	FEST International Film Festival	Belgrade Victor	Saeed Roustaee	Nominated
2020	Entrevues Film Festival	Grand Prix Janine Bazin Award	Saeed Roustaee	Nominated
2021	38e du Festival Policier	Best Film	Saeed Roustaee	Won
2021	38e du Festival Policier	Critics Award	Saeed Roustaee	Won
