= Emre Tetikel =

Turkish actor, author and teacher

- Emre Tetikel in 2026
- Born: 2 August 1985 (age 41); Tekirdağ, Turkey
- Occupations: actor, author, acting coach
- Years active: 2003–present
- Notable work: Ayakta Kal, Karagül, Dur Yolcu
- Height: 1.80 m (5 ft 11 in)
- Website: tetikelmusicgroup.com/emre-tetikel

Emre Tetikel (born 2 August 1985) is a Turkish film, television and theater actor, teacher and author. His roles include Berk in the film Ayakta Kal and Şahin in the television series Karagül.

== Early life ==
Originally from Tekirdağ, he was born in 1985 in Tekirdağ and raised there. He graduated from Namik Kemal High School. He was interested in acting during his secondary school and high school education and took part in Tekirdağ City theater and amateur theater groups.

== Career ==
Tetikel left Tekirdağ for university education and settled in Istanbul and graduated from Newport University of California with a distance education in English business administration. In 2008, he met Selçuk Uluergüven. Theater types such as Uluergüven and Aykut Oray took theater education, took part in various theater plays together and became professional. He continued his acting education in Bahariye art center, The New York Conservatory for Dramatic Arts, NY film academy and Ekol drama. He took part in television and internet advertisements during his student years. He made his television debut in 2008 as Morphy McMahon in Dur Yolcu.

He played Berk in the film Ayakta Kal, which was released on 16 January 2009. He later played Şahin in the television series Karagül. He portrayed the character "Engin" in Son Çıkış. He also portrayed the character of "Teoman" in the TV series Adını Sen Koy. He worked as a theater teacher in many colleges and private acting education institutions in Tekirdağ and İstanbul, and trained students for conservatory education.

In April 2019, Emre Tetikel participated in Reality show called "Seven cities of love", which was a competition film with the presence of Iranian and foreign film and television actors with the aim of showing interests and getting acquainted with the culture of other countries of the world. Also in the same year, he appeared in the "ninth season" of the "Iranian Dinner" competition directed by Saeid Aboutaleb and played a role and collaborated in this series.

Emre Tetikel is also an author. His novel Yalnız Aşka Sığınmak was published in 2015.

Tetikel has also released music.

== Discography ==
=== Singles ===
- Büyütme (Acoustic) (2026)
- Sarı Gelin (2026)
- Ben Bu Oyuna (2026)
- Eylül Mesaisi (2026)

== Filmography ==
=== TV series ===
TV series
Year	Title	Role	Director	TV Channel	Notes
2008	Dur Yolcu	Morphy McMahon	İsmail Güneş	TRT 1	Leading Role
2009	Küçük Kadınlar	Murat	Hakan Arslan	Kanal D	Supporting role
2015	Karagül	Şahin	Murat Saraçoğlu	Fox TV	Leading Role
2015	Son Çıkış	Engin	Ayhan Özen	TRT 1	Leading Role
2017	Ateş Böceği	Berk	Barış Yöş	Star TV	Supporting role
2018	Adını Sen Koy	Teoman	Fulya Yavuzoğlu	Star TV	Leading Role

=== Reality Show ===
Reality Show
Year	Title	Director	Season/Episode	Notes
2019	7 cities of love	Saeid Aboutaleb	All 15 episodes	Guest actor from Turkey
2019	Iranian Dinner	Saeid Aboutaleb	Series II – episode 9	Guest actor from Turkey

=== Films ===
Movies
Years	Title	Role	Director	Notes
2009	Ayakta Kal	Berk	Adnan Güler	Leading Role
2020	Paranoid: Everything Wipe from the Beginning	Mitat	Doğuş Arslan	Leading Role
2021	Küçük Yalanlar	Ozan Kömürcü	Bora Onur	Leading Role
2021	Parya & Derya	Emre	Reza Hossein Abadi	Leading Role
2024	O Gün Hava Bulutlu Değildi	Metin	Mohsen Rabiei	
2026	Emma Sevimli Köpek	Emre	Mohsen Rabiei	

=== Theater ===
Theaters
Year	Title	Role	Director
2005	Bir Yaz Gecesi Rüyası	Theseus	Selçuk Uluergüven
2008	Recebim Recebim	Muhtar	Selçuk Uluergüven
2009	Tek Perdelik Şaka	Karışık Eskiz	Selçuk Uluergüven
2009	Duvarların Ötesi	Ufaklık	Selçuk Uluergüven
2010–2020	Depo	Karışık Eskiz	Emre Karaoğlu

=== Short films ===
Short Film / Video Clip
Year	Title	Singer	Director	Role	Notes
2010	Şefkat Gibi	Hande Yener	Damla Demircioğlu	All Characters	Best Actor Award for Best Short Film
2016	Ayrıla Ayrıla	Levent Dörter	Gürcan Keltek	Leading Role	–

== Awards ==
In 2026, Tetikel received the Best Foreign Actor award at the International Film Festival organised by the Haryana Innovative Film Association.

== Bibliography ==
Books
Year	Title	Subject	Type	Language	Total Pages	ISBN	Publisher
2015	Yalnız Aşka Sığınmak	Love	Novel	Turkish	208	ISBN 9786054799954	Postiga
