= Gholamreza Takhti (film) =

2019 Iranian film

- Film poster
- Directed by: Bahram Tavakoli
- Written by: Saeid Malekan; Bahram Tavakoli
- Produced by: Saeid Malekan; Roozbeh Aghaie Pour
- Starring: Mohsen Takhti; Mahoor Alvand; Behnoosh Tabatabaei; Atila Pesyani
- Cinematography: Hamid Khozouie Abyane
- Edited by: Meysam Molaei
- Music by: Afshin Azizi
- Distributed by: Simaye Mehr
- Release dates: 1 February 2019 (Fajr Film Festival); 16 March 2019 (Iran)
- Country: Iran
- Language: Persian
- Budget: 8.5 billion toman
- Box office: 1.9 billion toman (Iran)

Gholamreza Takhti (Persian: غلامرضا تختی) is a 2019 Iranian biographical drama film directed by Bahram Tavakoli and written by Saeid Malekan about Olympic champion Iranian wrestler Gholamreza Takhti. The film screened for the first time at the 37th Fajr Film Festival and was released on March 16, 2019 in Iran theatrically.

== Cast ==
- Mohsen Takhti as Gholamreza Takhti
- Mohammad Reza Alimardani as Gholamreza Takhti's voice
  - Amirreza Faramarzi as child Gholamreza Takhti
  - Alireza Goudarzi as young Gholamreza Takhti
  - Shahrokh Shahbazi as old Gholamreza Takhti
- Mahoor Alvand as Leili
- Behnoosh Tabatabei as Shahla Tavakoli
- Atila Pesyani as Haj Fe'li
- Farhad Aeesh as Mohammad Mosadegh
- Hamid Reza Azarang as Taleghani
- Shirin Yazdanbakhsh as Hotel's chef
- Parivash Nazarieh as Ahmad's mother
- Siavosh Tahmoures as Takhti's coach
- Setareh Pesyani as Hotel's servant
- Mojtaba Pirzadeh as Takhti's friend
- Mohammad Valizadegan as Takhti's friend
- Banipal Shoomoon as Takhti's friend
- Masoumeh Ghasemipour as Takhti's mother
- Morteza Rostami as Takhti's father
- Yadollah Shademani as Neighbor
- Mehdi Ghorbani as Takhti's fan

== Reception ==
=== Awards and nominations ===
Year	Award	Category	Recipient	Result
2019	Fajr Film Festival	Best Cinematography	Hamid Khozouie Abyane	Won
2019	Fajr Film Festival	Best Production Design	Keyvan Moghaddam	Won
2019	Fajr Film Festival	Audience Choice of Best Film	Gholamreza Takhti	Third Place
2019	Fajr Film Festival	Best Film	Saeid Malekan	Nominated
2019	Fajr Film Festival	Best Director	Bahram Tavakoli	Nominated
2019	Fajr Film Festival	Best Editor	Maysam Molaei	Nominated
2019	Fajr Film Festival	Best Original Score	Afshin Azizi	Nominated
2019	Fajr Film Festival	Best Sound Effects	Amir Hossein Ghasemi	Nominated
2019	Fajr Film Festival	Best Visual Effects	Mohsen Khirabadi, Reza Misaghi, Shahab Najafi	Nominated
2019	Fajr Film Festival	Best Costume Design	Amir Malekpour	Nominated
2019	Fajr Film Festival	Best Makeup	Saeid Malekan	Nominated
2020	Fajr Film Festival	Best Still Photography	Maryam Takhtkeshian	Won
2019	Hafez Awards	Best Original Score	Afshin Azizi	Nominated
2019	Hafez Awards	Best Cinematography	Hamid Khozouie Abyane	Nominated
2020	Iran's Film Critics and Writers Association	Best Film	Saeid Malekan	Nominated
2020	Iran's Film Critics and Writers Association	Best Director	Bahram Tavakoli	Nominated
2020	Iran's Film Critics and Writers Association	Best Cinematography	Hamid Khozouie Abyane	Nominated
2020	Iran's Film Critics and Writers Association	Best Original Score	Afshin Azizi	Nominated
2020	Iran's Film Critics and Writers Association	Best Editor	Maysam Molaei	Nominated
2020	Iran's Film Critics and Writers Association	Best Technical Achievement	Mohsen Khirabadi, Reza Misaghi, Shahab Najafi (Visual Effects)	Nominated
2020	Iran's Film Critics and Writers Association	Best Technical Achievement	Keyvan Moghaddam (Production Design)	Won
