= Finding Farideh =

2018 film

- Film poster
- Directed by: Kourosh Ataee; Azadeh Moussavi
- Written by: Kourosh Ataee; Eline Farideh Koning
- Starring: Eline Farideh Koning
- Music by: Afshin Azizi
- Release date: April 20, 2018 (FIFF)
- Running time: 88 minutes
- Country: Iran
- Language: Persian

Finding Farideh is a 2018 Iranian documentary film directed by Kourosh Ataee and Azadeh Moussavi. The film is about a 40-year-old woman who was adopted and raised by a Dutch family. She now wants to travel to Iran in search of her biological parents. The documentary was selected as the Iranian entry for the Best International Feature Film at the 92nd Academy Awards, but it was not nominated.

== Cast ==
- Eline Farideh Koning

== See also ==
- List of submissions to the 92nd Academy Awards for Best International Feature Film
- List of Iranian submissions for the Academy Award for Best International Feature Film
