= When the Moon Was Full =

- Film poster
- Directed by: Narges Abyar
- Written by: Narges Abyar; Morteza Esfahani
- Produced by: Mohamad-hossein Ghasemi
- Starring: Elnaz Shakerdoost; Hootan Shakiba
- Cinematography: Saman Lotfian
- Edited by: Hamid Najafi Rad
- Music by: Masoud Sekhavatdoost
- Distributed by: Noore Taban
- Release date: 2019
- Running time: 140 minutes
- Country: Iran
- Language: Persian

When the Moon Was Full (Persian: شبی‌ که ماه کامل شد) is a 2019 Iranian drama film written and directed by Narges Abyar. The film is based on the true story of the brother and sister-in-law of Abdolmalek Rigi, the former leader of the Jundallah terrorist group in the Iran's southeastern province of Sistan and Baluchestan. It won multiple awards including the Crystal Simorgh for Best Film at the 37th Fajr Film Festival.

== Plot ==
The film tells the story of Abdolhamid Rigi and Faezeh Mansuri, who meet when Abdolhamid is working in a store at a bazaar in Zahedan where Faezeh and her mother are customers. Abdolhamid is the younger brother of Abdolmalek Rigi, the leader of the Jundallah (Soldiers of God) terrorist group who spread terror in southeastern Iran while being supported by Taliban. Abdolhamid marries Faezeh and forces her to move to Pakistan, along with her brother Shahab. Faezeh and Shahab become caught up in the activities of Jundallah.

Faezeh's family discovers she has been taken captive by Jundallah in Pakistan. The terrorist group beheads Shahab because they believe he is an Iranian agent. Abdolmalek Rigi calls Faezeh and Shahab's father, and tells him to watch a video of his son's beheading on Al-Arabiya the following night. Faezeh has a chance to escape from Pakistan but she chooses to remain there with her three children. On Abdolmalek's orders, Abdolhamid kills Faezeh while she is sleeping.

In 2010, Abdolmalek is traveling to Bishkek from Dubai on a regular Airbus plane when an Iranian intelligence officer forces the plane to land in Iran, leading to the arrest of both Rigi brothers and, after a court finds them guilty of dozens of criminal acts, their execution the same year.

At the time, Iranian officials accused the U.S. and some Arab countries of funding Abdolmalek Rigi's activities. The unnamed officers who arrested the Rigi brothers tell the Iranian media that Abdolmalek had been on his way to a meeting with diplomat Richard Holbrooke near Bishkek. Following the Rigi brothers' capture, Pakistan was also reportedly said to have helped Iran nab the two.

== Cast ==
- Elnaz Shakerdoost as Faezah Mansuri
- Houtan Shakiba as Abdolhamid Rigi
- Armin Rahimian as Abdolmalek Rigi
- Fereshteh Sadre Orafaee as the mother of the Rigi brothers
- Pedram Sharifi as Shahab, the brother of Faezah
- Shabnam Moghadami as Faezeh and Shahab mother

== Production ==
Abyar traveled to related areas to collect information about the Rigi brothers and their ethnic group, the Rigi. She presented Abdolmalek Rigi as a member of the Rigi ethnic group which has a background in the armed conflict in Sistan and Baluchestan. In a press conference at the 37th Fajr International Film Festival, Abyar called the Rigi ethnic group "a respectable tribe" and said: "They wanted a film made to differentiate them from the Rigi brothers".

Producer Mahmoud Razavi posted on Instagram: "I was interested in producing a television series about Abdolmalek Rigi a few years ago. I prepared a proposal and I gave it to a famous director of Iranian cinema. But he finally said to me, 'Dear Mahmoud, I love my life; they will kill me'".

== Reception ==
=== Critical response ===
Parviz Jahed, a freelance film critic and filmmaker, wrote: "The film has been given a particular face by Narges Abyar and she will find a special place among women in the Iranian cinema, because she worked on a rare subject that the female filmmakers in Iran are loath to act on, and that is terrorism". Sociologist Emad Afrough said in an interview with Khabar Online that "the film accurately depicts Islamic extremism and the culture of the Baloch people".

Journalist and screenwriter Keyvan Kasirian said, "The new film of Narges Abyar is a romance in the face of extreme violence. Abyar's film has useful details, it transmits information on time, and despite its long history, it has a good rhythm and is not boring". Film critic Fariba Oshowi stated, "Narges Abyar, as in many of her past films, has been dreaming of a fairy tale of women in her country".

Deborah Young of The Hollywood Reporter, who attended the Fajr International Film Festival, called the film "chilling, operatic storytelling". She writes: "It's not a perfect film – characters' viewpoints shift like the sands, undercutting the build-up of suspense, and even the two-hour-plus running time is too short to do justice to the Al-Qaeda scenes. But what is lacking in depth is made up for in the passionate directness of the filmmaking".

=== Awards ===
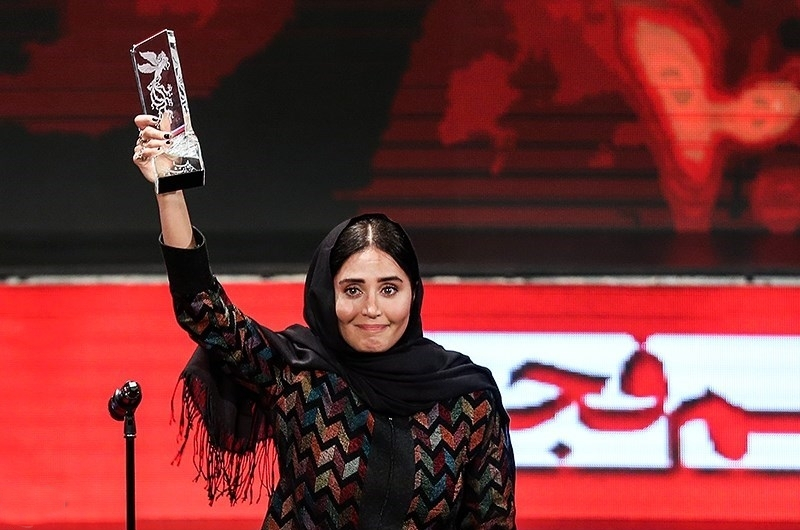
Elnaz Shakerdoost wins the best actress Crystal Simorgh at the 37th Fajr Film Festival

When the Moon Was Full won the Crystal Simorgh for best film at the 37th Fajr Film Festival in 2019. It also won in the categories of best film, best director (Narges Abyar), best actor (Houtan Shakiba), best actress (Elnaz Shakerdoost), best supporting actress (Fereshteh Sadre Orafaee), best makeup direction (Iman Omidvari), and best costume design.

After receiving the Crystal Simorgh awards, Abyar said: "I was never nominated for any award in my country and it made me sad. But now I won the Simorgh and this is really valuable to me". Producer Mohammad-Hossein Qasemi, Abyar's husband, donated his award to Azam Mohsendoost, the real-life mother of Faezeh and Shahab.

== See also ==
- Breath (2016 film)
- Track 143 (2014 film)
