= Don't Be Embarrassed =

- Directed by: Reza Maqsoodi
- Written by: Reza Maqsoodi; Afra Jurablou
- Produced by: Seyed Amir Parvin Hosseini
- Starring: Ahmad Mehranfar; Shabnam Moghaddami; Linda Kiani; Shohreh Lorestani; Kobra Goodarzi; Elnaz Habibi; Sam Derakhshani
- Music by: Arman Musapour
- Release date: 2018
- Country: Iran

Don't Be Embarrassed is a 2018 Iranian film directed by Reza Maghsoudi, written by Maghsoudi and Afra Jurablou, and produced by Seyed Amir Parvin Hosseini.

== Synopsis ==
This movie narrates the story of a couple, who already have married children, and conceive a child in their middle age. This happens in a small village where nothing is hidden from the neighbors.

Qanbar (Ahmad Mehranfar) was thinking about the progress of the country and insisted that they have more children. Sanam (Shabnam Moghaddami) gave birth to a baby girl on the day her children and daughters-in-law came to her house. In order to hide the child from his other children, Qanbar tells them that someone had left the child behind the door of the house and he picked it up and brought it inside. While recreating the scene, he leaves the child behind the door but the child is gone when he reopens the door. Qanbar and Sanam frantically look for the baby, which makes the older children realize that the missing child is their sister.
