= African Violet (film) =

- Film poster
- Directed by: Mona Zandi Haghighi
- Written by: Hamidreza Bababeygi; Mona Zandi Haghighi
- Produced by: Sina Saeidian; Alireza Shoja Nouri
- Starring: Fatemeh Motamed Arya; Saeed Aghakhani; Reza Babak
- Cinematography: Farhad Saba
- Edited by: Bahram Dehghani
- Music by: Peyman Yazdanian
- Production company: Behnegar
- Distributed by: Dreamlab Films
- Release dates: 1 February 2019 (Fajr Film Festival); 1 September 2020 (Iran)
- Running time: 93 minutes
- Country: Iran
- Language: Persian

African Violet (Persian: بنفشه آفریقایی, romanized: Banafsheh Afrighaei) is a 2019 Iranian drama film directed by Mona Zandi Haghighi and written by Haghighi and Hamidreza Bababeigi. The film screened for the first time at the 37th Fajr Film Festival and received 2 nominations.

== Plot ==
Shokoo decides to bring her elderly ex-husband, Fereydoun, to come live with her and her husband, Reza, who also once was Fereydoun's best friend. Initially, Fereydoun refuses to speak to her and Reza is uncomfortable with him in their home. Shokoo navigates the challenges of caring for the ailing Fereydoun while all three of them deal with their emotions and memories of their past relationships.

The film explores themes of love, forgiveness, and the complexities of human relationships, particularly in the context of an elderly couple reuniting under challenging circumstances.

== Cast ==
- Fatemah Motamed Aria as Shokoo
- Saeed Aghakhani as Reza
- Reza Babak as Fereydoun
- Mehdi Hosseinina as Ghasem
- Roya Javidnia as Soraya
- Neda Jebraeili as Fereshteh
- Maryam Shirazi as Shahla

== Reception ==
=== Accolades ===
Year	Award	Category	Recipient	Result
2019	Fajr Film Festival	Best Actress In a Leading Role	Fatemah Motamed Aria	Nominated
2019	Fajr Film Festival	Best Original Score	Peyman Yazdanian	Nominated
