= Masoud Sekhavatdoust =

Masoud Sekhavatdoust مسعود سخاوت دوست
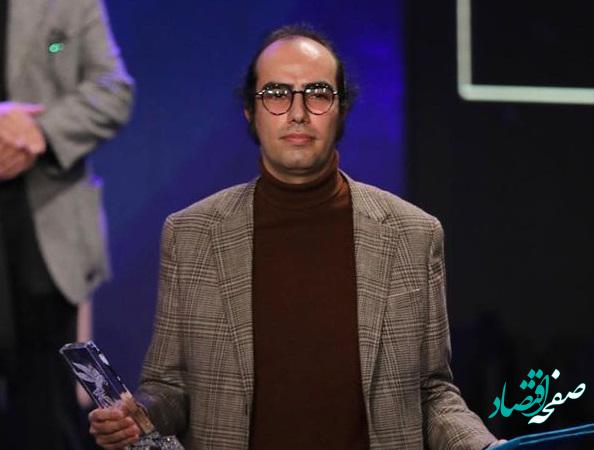

Background information
- Born: Masoud Sekhavatdoust; 21 September 1984 (age 41); Qazvin, Iran
- Genres: Persian symphonic music
- Occupations: composer, conductor

Masoud Sakhvatdoust (مسعود سخاوت دوست) (born 21 September 1984) is an Iranian writer, composer and musician. He is the composer of more than 50 international films.

He won the Best Composer award at the Fajr Film Festival for Breath and "The Situation of Mehdi" and "Fragrant", "Number 10". He won the Golden Butterfly and Diploma of Honor for Best Music for Lipar. he also won the Hafez Awards 2020 For movie "When the Moon Was Full" .

== Biography ==
Masoud Sekhavatdoust was born in 1984 in Qazvin. He started learning the Santoor at the age of 10 and continued with his master Parviz Meshkatian up to the advanced level. At the age of 15, he started taking harmony and composition lessons from Alireza Mashayekhi. He has taken part in a few master classes of Estonian composer Arvo Pärt and Professor Roger Wallis from the Royal Institute of Technology in Stockholm and he has also taken an advanced stage course in Iran with Professor Kiawash Sahebnasagh. He has taken a few Conducting lessons with Taghi Zarabi.

He is a nominee for the award Crystal Simorgh Best Music Shena-ye Parvaneh (2020), Crystal Simorgh Best Music Shabi Ke Mah Kamel Shod (2019), Golden Butterfly The Best Artistic & Technical Achievement

Wolf Cubs of Apple Valley (2020), Crystal Simorgh Best Music Nafas (2016), Jury Prize Tallinn Black Nights Film Festival for Best Music Shabi Ke Mah Kamel Shod (2019)

He also achieved Golden Butterfly and Diploma of Honor for Best Music for 'Lipar' .

He won the Best Composer award "Cristal Simorgh" at the Fajr Film Festival for "The Situation of Mehdi" "Fragrant", "Number 10".

== Discography ==
- New Dementia (2016), Javan Records
- Sign (Original Motion Picture Soundtrack) (2020), Javan Records

== Filmography ==
Year	Name	Director	Award
2010	Farewell Baghdad	Mehdi Naderi	
2011	Three and a Half	Naghi Nemati	
2012	Charcoal (Documentary short)	Nava Rezvani	
2013	Sayehay-e Roshan (Documentary)	Mohammad Reza Jahanpanah	
2013	Dandelion Fly (Short)	Iraj Mohammadi	
2014	With Others	Nasser Zamiri	
2014	Pope	Ehsan Abdipur	
2015	Helmsman	Majid Esmaili Parsa	
2016	Breath	Narges Abyar	
2016	Sayehay movazi	Asghar Naimi	
2016	Track 143	Narges Abyar	
2017	Afsongar	Hossein Tabrizi	
2017	Yellow	Mostafa Taghizadeh	
2017	Walking on String	Ahmad Reza Mo'tamedi	
2018	Lovelance: The Center of Emergency Love	Mohsen Mahini	
2018	Armando (TV Series)	Hamid Taheri; Sadegh Khoshhal	
2018	Confiscation	Mehran Ahmadi	
2018	A Heart for an Eye	Rahim Toofan	
2018	Dayan	Behrouz Nouranipour	
2018	Lovers (TV series)	Manouchehr Hadi	
2018	Gold Carrier	Turaj Aslani	
2018	Bitter (Short)	Majid Esmaili Parsa	
2018	Havalie Paeiz (TV Series)	Hossein Namazi	
2019	When the Moon Was Full	Narges Abyar	
2019	The Samurai in Berlin	Mehdi Naderi	
2019	Homayoun (Documentary)	Pirooz Kalantari	
2020	Wolf Cubs of Apple Valley	Fereydoun Najafi	
2020	The Undercover	Amir-Abbas Rabiei	
2020	Drown	Mohammad Kart	
2019-2020	Mannequin (TV series)	Hossein Soheilizadeh	
2020	Crows	Naghi Nemati	
2020	Homeless	Majid Tavakoli	
2021	Ablagh	Narges Abyar	
2021	Be human once a week	Shahram Shah hoseyni	
2021	Major	ehsan Abdipoor	
2021	Gandom	Hashem moradi	
2021	1001 NIGHTS APART	Sarvnaz Alambeigi	
2021	Lipar	Hosein Rigi	
2021	The Situation of Mehdi	Hadi Hejazifar	Cristal Simorgh
2022	The Last Snow	Amirhossein Asgari	
2022	Fragrant	Hadi moghadamdoost	Cristal Simorgh
2022	Number 10	hamid zargar	Cristal Simorgh
2022	Leather Jacket man	ali mirzayi	
2023	Bread And Roses	Jennifer Lawrence and sahra mani	
2024	Stranger	Soroush Mohammadzadeh	
