= Mohammad Davoudi (screenwriter) =

Iranian writer and director

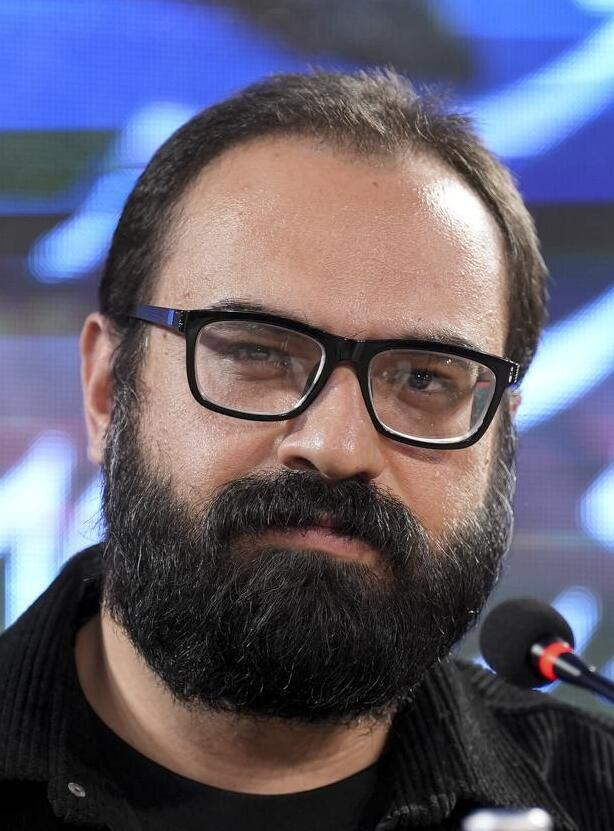
- Davoudi at the Fajr Film Festival (2026)
- Born: 1989 (age 36–37)
- Occupations: film director, screen writer

Mohammad Davoudi (born 1989 Gonabad گناباد) is an Iranian screenwriter and director. He won the Best Screenplay Award at the 37th Fajr Film Festival for the film Castle of Dreams (2019).
