= Blockage =

- Film poster
- Directed by: Mohsen Gharaie
- Written by: Saeed Roustayi
- Produced by: Bahman Kamyar
- Starring: Hamed Behdad; Baran Kosari
- Cinematography: Morteza Hedayat
- Edited by: Sepideh Abdolvahab
- Music by: Reza Mortazavi
- Distributed by: Hedayat Film
- Release dates: 31 January 2017 (Fajr Film Festival); 27 December 2017 (Iran)
- Running time: 82 minutes
- Country: Iran
- Language: Persian
- Box office: 1.06 billion toman (Iran)

Blockage (Persian: سد معبر, romanized: Sade Ma'bar) is a 2017 Iranian drama film directed by Mohsen Gharaie and written by Saeed Roustayi. The film screened for the first time at the 35th Fajr Film Festival and received 4 nominations.

It was released on December 27, 2017, in Iran theatrically.

== Premise ==
Ghasem (Hamed Behdad), a municipality employee uses his position to put his hands on other people's money to collect enough to buy a truck, while his wife Narges (Baran Kosari) threatens to abort their child if he does not buy a house with their savings.

== Cast ==
- Hamed Behdad as Ghasem
- Baran Kosari as Narges
- Nader Fallah as Rasool
- Gity Ghasemi as Razieh
- Mohsen Kiaee as Mehdi
- Negar Abedi as Mona
- Alireza Kamali as Ghasem's colleague
- Bahram Sorouri Nejad

== Reception ==
=== Critical response ===
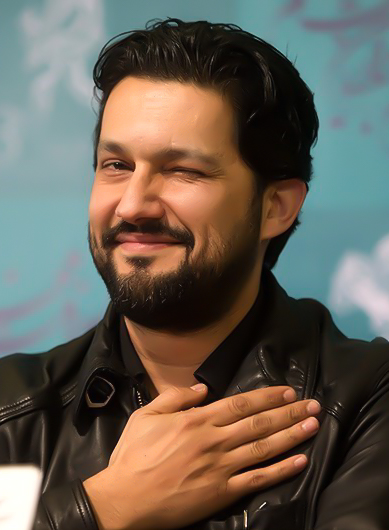
Behdad's performance received critical praise, winning him various accolades.

=== Accolades ===
Year	Award	Category	Recipient	Result	Ref.
2017	Fajr Film Festival	Best Supporting Actress	Gity Ghasemi	Nominated	
2017	Fajr Film Festival	Best Supporting Actor	Nader Fallah	Nominated	
2017	Fajr Film Festival	Best Screenplay	Saeed Roustayi	Nominated	
2017	Fajr Film Festival	Best Editor	Sepideh Abdolvahab	Nominated	
2018	Hafez Awards	Best Motion Picture	Bahman Kamyar	Nominated	
2018	Hafez Awards	Best Director – Motion Picture	Mohsen Gharaie	Nominated	
2018	Hafez Awards	Best Actor – Motion Picture	Nader Fallah	Nominated	
2018	Hafez Awards	Best Actor – Motion Picture	Hamed Behdad	Nominated	
2018	Hafez Awards	Best Actress – Motion Picture	Baran Kosari	Nominated	
2018	Hafez Awards	Best Screenplay – Motion Picture	Saeed Roustayi	Nominated	
2018	Hafez Awards	Best Editor – Motion Picture	Sepideh Abdolvahab	Nominated	
2017	Busan International Film Festival	New Currents Award	Mohsen Gharaie	Won	
2018	Iran Cinema Celebration	Best Actor In a Leading Role	Hamed Behdad	Won	
2018	Iran Cinema Celebration	Best Actor in a Supporting Role	Nader Fallah	Nominated	
2018	Iran Cinema Celebration	Best Production Design	Hojat Ashtari	Won	
2017	Iran's Film Critics and Writers Association	Best Actor In a Leading Role	Hamed Behdad	Won	
2017	Iran's Film Critics and Writers Association	Best Actor in a Supporting Role	Nader Fallah	Nominated	
2017	Iran's Film Critics and Writers Association	Best Actress in a Supporting Role	Gity Ghasemi	Nominated	
2017	Iran's Film Critics and Writers Association	Best Editor	Sepideh Abdolvahab	Nominated	
2018	Malaysia International Film Festival	Best Actor	Hamed Behdad	Won	
2018	Malaysia International Film Festival	Best Supporting Actress	Gity Ghasemi	Nominated	
2018	Malaysia International Film Festival	Best Film	Mohsen Gharaie	Nominated	
2018	Malaysia International Film Festival	Best Director	Mohsen Gharaie	Nominated	
2018	Malaysia International Film Festival	Best Screenplay	Saeed Roustayi	Nominated	
2018	Sofia International Film Festival	Best Film	Mohsen Gharaie	Won	
2018	Transatlantyk Festival	Section "New Cinema"	Mohsen Gharaie	Nominated	
