= Saeed Roustayi =

Iranian film director and screenwriter

- سعید روستایی
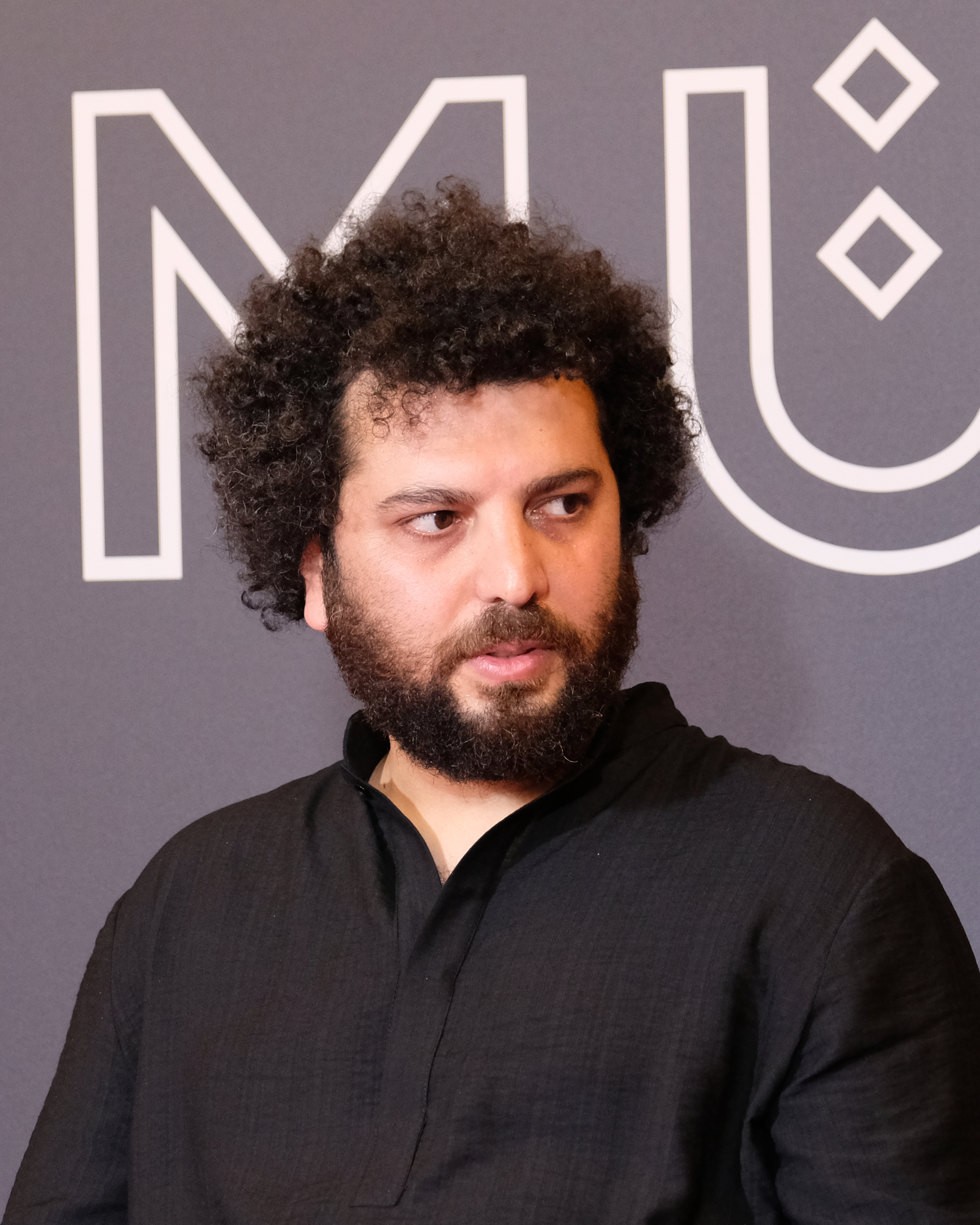
- Roustayi at the 2022 Filmfest München
- Born: August 14, 1989 (age 37); Tehran, Iran
- Education: Soore University (BFTV)
- Occupations: Director; screenwriter; producer
- Years active: 2011–present
- Notable work: Life and a Day; Just 6.5; Leila's Brothers

Saeed Roustaee (Persian: سعید روستایی, born August 14, 1989), also spelled Saeed Roustayi, is an Iranian filmmaker, screenwriter and producer. His works primarily focus on issues of social injustice, as well as his portrayals of women in Iranian society.

His second feature, Just 6.5 (2019), was nominated for the César Award for Best Foreign Film. His third and fourth films, Leila's Brothers (2022) and Woman and Child (2025), were selected to compete for the Palme d'Or at the Cannes Film Festival in 2022 and 2025, respectively.

In June 2025, Roustayi was invited to join the Directors Branch of the Academy of Motion Picture Arts and Sciences.

== Early life ==
He graduated from Soore University with a Bachelor of Film and Television in Directing.

== Career ==
Life and a Day is his first major cinematic work. At the Fajr International Film Festival, Roustayi won 2 Crystal Simorghs for best directing and best screenplay. He received the 2016 Reflet d'Or for Best Feature at the Geneva International Film Festival Tous Ecrans.

=== 2023 imprisonment ===
His third feature film Leila's Brothers competed in the 2022 Cannes Film Festival where it won the FIPRESCI Prize for films screened in the main competition section.

In August 2023, the Islamic Revolutionary Court sentenced Roustayi to six months in prison for entering Leila's Brothers in the 2022 Cannes Film Festival, claiming that the film participated in "the opposition’s propaganda against the Islamic system". Roustayi alleged that Iran's Ministry of Culture had requested a series of scene changes to Leila's Brothers which he had refused to implement. Roustayi is due to serve nine days of his sentence and a suspended period of five years, as well as participating in other punitive measures such as completing a course on "creating movies aligned with national interests and national morality".

== Filmography ==
=== Feature films ===
Year	English title	Original title	Notes
2016	Life and a Day	ابد و یک روز	
2019	Just 6.5	متری شیش و نیم	World premiere at the 76th Venice International Film Festival
2022	Leila's Brothers	برادران لیلا	World premiere at the 2022 Cannes Film Festival
2025	Woman and Child	زن و بچه	World premiere at the 2025 Cannes Film Festival

=== Other credits ===
Year	Title	Director	Writer	Producer	Notes
2011	Saturday	Yes	Yes	Yes	Short film
2012	Ceremony	Yes	Yes	Yes	Short film
2014	The Very Uncrowded Street	Yes	Yes	Yes	Short film
2017	Blockage	No	Yes	No	

== Awards and nominations ==
Award	Year	Category	Nominated Work	Result	Ref.
Cannes Film Festival	2022	Palm d'Or	Leila's Brothers	Nominated	
Cannes Film Festival	2022	FIPRESCI Prize	Leila's Brothers	Won	
Cannes Film Festival	2022	Citizenship Prize	Leila's Brothers	Won	
Chicago International Film Festival	2019	Best New Director	Just 6.5	Nominated	
César Awards	2022	Best Foreign Film	Just 6.5	Nominated	
Entrevues Film Festival	2020	Grand Prix	Just 6.5	Nominated	
Fajr Film Festival	2016	Best Director	Life and a Day	Won	
Fajr Film Festival	2016	Best Screenplay	Life and a Day	Won	
Fajr Film Festival	2016	Best First Director	Life and a Day	Won	
Fajr Film Festival	2019	Best Director	Just 6.5	Nominated	
Fajr Film Festival	2019	Best Screenplay	Just 6.5	Nominated	
FEST International Film Festival	2020	Best Film	Just 6.5	Nominated	
Hafez Awards	2016	Best Director	Life and a Day	Nominated	
Hafez Awards	2016	Best Screenplay	Life and a Day	Won	
Hafez Awards	2019	Best Director	Just 6.5	Won	
Hafez Awards	2019	Best Screenplay	Just 6.5	Nominated	
Iran Cinema Celebration	2016	Best Director	Life and a Day	Won	
Iran Cinema Celebration	2016	Best Screenplay	Life and a Day	Won	
Iran Cinema Celebration	2019	Best Director	Just 6.5	Won	
Iran Cinema Celebration	2019	Best Screenplay	Just 6.5	Nominated	
Iran's Film Critics and Writers Association	2016	Best Director	Life and a Day	Won	
Iran's Film Critics and Writers Association	2016	Best Screenplay	Life and a Day	Won	
Iran's Film Critics and Writers Association	2020	Best Director	Just 6.5	Third Place	
Iran's Film Critics and Writers Association	2020	Best Screenplay	Just 6.5	Nominated	
Munich International Film Festival	2022	Best International Film	Leila's Brothers	Nominated	
Nahal Short Film Festival	2013	Best Fiction Short Feature	Ceremony	Won	
Tokyo International Film Festival	2019	Best Director	Just 6.5	Won	
Tokyo International Film Festival	2019	Grand Prix	Just 6.5	Nominated	
Venice International Film Festival	2019	Best Feature Film – Horizons	Just 6.5	Nominated	
Zurich Film Festival	2019	Best International Feature Film	Just 6.5	Nominated	
Zurich Film Festival	2019	Special Mention – International Feature Film	Just 6.5	Won	
