= Selçuk Uluergüven =

Turkish actor

- Born: 1 January 1941; Istanbul, Turkey
- Died: 8 January 2014 (aged 73); Aydın, Turkey
- Resting place: Zincirlikuyu Cemetery, Istanbul
- Occupation: Actor
- Years active: 1962–2014
- Spouse: Türkan Uluergüven
- Children: 2

Selçuk Uluergüven (1 January 1941 – 8 January 2014) was a Turkish actor.

== Career ==
In 1962, Seçuk Uluergüven began his theatre career at Meydan Stage in Ankara. In the following years, he acted on stage at Ankara Sanat Theatre, Dormen Theatre, Theatre TÖS, Halk Oyuncuları Theatre and Sanatevi. He appeared also in many movies and television series. For his role as "Davut Usta" in the dramatic comedy TV series Bizimkiler, he gained wide popularity. Uluergüven was also the art director of Bahariye Art Center in Kadıköy district of Istanbul.

Between 1998 and 2002, he served as municipal councillor in Kadıköy.

== Death ==
Uluergüven died on 8 January 2014, aged 73, at the Adnan Menderes University Hospital in Aydın. He had been in the hospital for the three months leading up to his death to receive treatment for a dislocated femoral prosthesis. He was survived by his wife, Türkan Uluergüven (64), his son Emre and granddaughter Arya Sanat (5).

His corpse was transferred to Istanbul following his last will. After a memorial service at the Caddebostan Cultural Center and the religious funeral at Şakirin Mosque on 10 January, he was laid to rest at the Zincirlikuyu Cemetery next to the grave of his son Eren, who died at the age of 21 following an accident on theatre stage in 2004.

== Acting ==
=== Theatre plays ===
- El Kapısı - Bilgesu Erenus
- 403. Kilometre - İsmet Küntay
- Hitler Rejiminin Korku ve Sefaleti - Bertolt Brecht
- Karaağaçlar Altında Arzu
- Devri Süleyman
- Hamdi Ortadirek
- Her şey İşporta
- Hangisi Karısı
- Sevgilime Göz Kulak Ol
- Macbeth
- Gülhane Parkı
- Tek Perdelik Şaka
- Zafer Madalyası

=== Movies ===
- İstanbul - 2011
- Devrimden Sonra - 2011
- Harbi Define - 2010
- Aloya - 2006
- Çarpışma - 2005
- Beş Kollu Avize 2004
- Fişgittin Bey - 2003
- Gönlümdeki Köşk Olmasa - 2002
- Hiçbiryerde - 2001
- Duruşma - 1999
- Sırtımdan Vuruldum - 1997
- Kurtuluş - 1996
- Türk Tutkusu - 1994
- İz - 1994
- Babam Askerde - 1994
- Kıvılcım - 1993
- Gölge Oyunu - 1992
- Düttürü Dünya - 1988
- Ateş Gibi - 1988
- Deniz - 1987
- Suçumuz İnsan Olmak - 1986
- Uzun Bir Gece - 1986
- Bir Avuç Cennet - 1985
- Mine - 1982
- Öğretmen Kemal - 1981
- At - 1981
- Unutulmayanlar - 1981
- Bereketli Topraklar Üzerinde - 1979 (also producer)
- Aslan Bacanak - 1977
- Caniko - 1976
- 2 X 2 = 5 - 1974
- Güllü Geliyor Güllü - 1973

=== Television series ===
- Hayat Devam Ediyor (2011)
- Adanalı (2010) Sadullah Baba
- Ezel (2009), guest appearance (2010)
- Yusuf Yüzlü (2004)
- Melekler Adası (2004)
- Asmalı Konak (2002)
- Dedem, Gofret ve Ben (2001)
- Eltiler (1997)
- Yazlıkçılar (1993)
- Bizimkiler (1989-2002), Davut Usta
- Erikçigiller (1984-1986)
- Evdekiler (1996)
