= Theater an der Ruhr =

Theater in Mulheim, North Rhine-Westphalia, Germany

Coordinates: 51°26′21″N 6°49′25″E

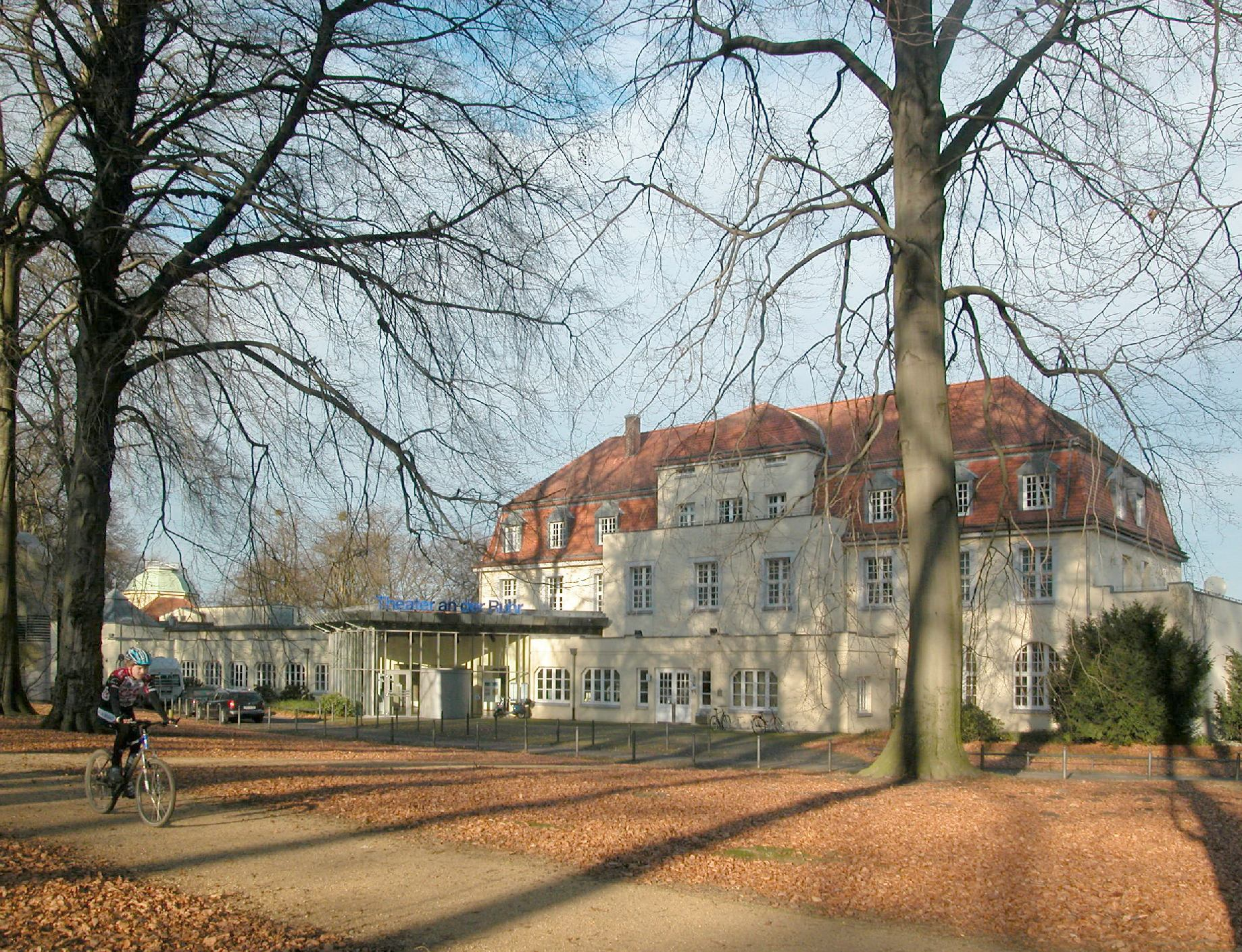
Theater an der Ruhr

Theater an der Ruhr is a theatre in Mulheim, North Rhine-Westphalia, Germany. It was founded in 1980 by Italian director Roberto Ciulli and dramaturge Helmut Schäfer as gGmbH in Mülheim an der Ruhr. The city of Mülheim also became a companion gGmbH. The theatre is subsidised with a budget of 3.6 million euros yearly to 50% and is financed to 50% by the income of the theatre. His draught means an artistic and economic alternative to the customary model of municipal stages.

== History ==
In 1981 the theatre was founded in the Ruhr by Roberto Ciulli, Helmut Schäfer and Gralf-Edzard Habben. The first premiere was Lulu von Frank Wedekind in November, 1981. Already in the first year a cooperation begins with the free national stage in Berlin and every staging is so conceived, that the scenery of Gralf-Edzard Habben fits in a truck container and can go therefore at a reasonable price on tour. The Tourneen also became fast the main taking factor of the theatre. In 1982 the theatre was invited in the Ruhr to guest performances with her stagings "God" and "death" in the free national stage Berlin. In 1988 it was chosen by the trade journal Theater Heute for the theatre of the year.
