= Lane 4 =

2019 Brazilian film

- Poster
- Portuguese: Raia 4
- Directed by: Emiliano Cunha
- Screenplay by: Emiliano Cunha
- Starring: Brídia Moni
- Production company: Ausgang
- Release date: 17 March 2019 (Cartagena)
- Running time: 95 minutes
- Language: Portuguese

Lane 4 (Portuguese: Raia 4) is a Brazilian film from 2019, directed and written by Emiliano Cunha.
