= Mona Zandi Haghighi =

Iranian film director

Mona Zandi
- مونا زندی حقیقی
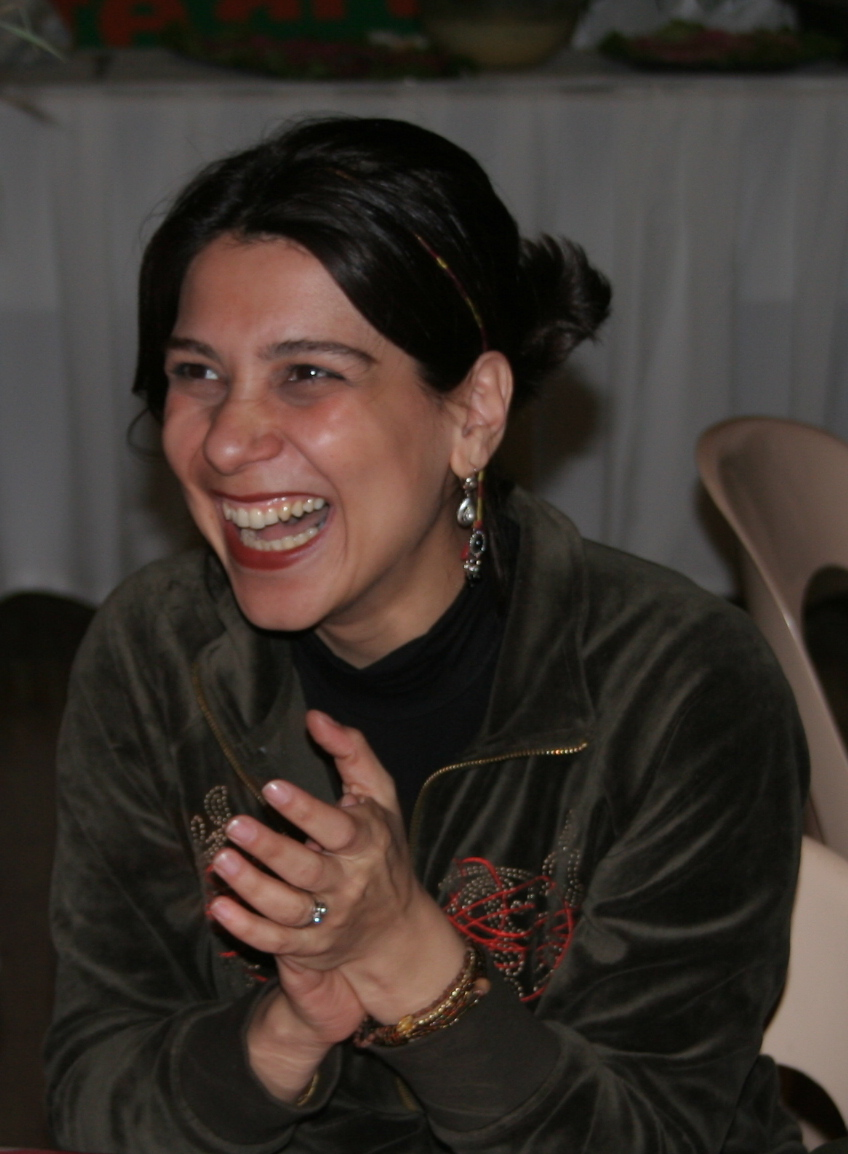
- Born: 20 October 1972 (age 53); Tehran, Iran
- Education: Tehran University
- Occupation: Film director
- Website: IMDb profile

Mona Zandi (Persian: مونا زندی حقیقی; born 20 October 1972 in Tehran) is an Iranian film director. She is best known as a director and editor of short films, documentaries, and feature films. Her film work belongs to the cinema of post-revolutionary Iran, which focuses on contemporary social issues within Persian culture. She has worked with Iranian film director and pioneer Rakhshan Bani-E'temad.

== Career ==
Zandi studied interior design at Tehran University.

Afterwards, she worked as an editor on several films, including Bull's Horn (Kianoosh Avari, 1995), Rahban (Reza Sobhani, 1999) and The Eight Thirty Train (Behzad Khodaveisi, 2000). Additionally, she directed several of her own short films and documentaries. On a Friday Afternoon (also known as Friday Evening or Asr e-Jome), released in 2006, was her first feature film.

== On a Friday Afternoon ==
Zandi's premiere feature film was released in 2006 by Cinema 79 Co. It was shot on 35mm Color 76 film. The primary credits include Hussein Jafarian (cinematographer), Sepideh Abdolvahab (editor), Jila Mehrjooee (sets and costumes), Behrooz Moavenian (sound), Fardin Khalatbari (music) and Jahangir Kossari (producer).

The film documents the conflicts experienced by an Iranian family in Tehran. The screenplay was written by Farid Mostafavi, based on Zandi's idea . In the film, characters Sogand (Roya Nownahall) and her son, Omid (Mehrdad Sedighiyan) do not get along. Omid acts out because he does not have a present father. It is suggested that Sogand has a secret that is affecting her wellbeing and relationship with her son, until the arrival of Sogand's sister, Banafshe (Haniye Tayassol), reveals the family's dark past. The film deals with topics of sexual abuse and familial dysfunction.

The film was screened at several International film festivals, including the Tiburon International Film Festival (2007), the Rochelle International Film Festival (2007), Fajr International Film Festival (2006), Thessaloniki International Film Festival (2007) and Gene Siskel Film Center's Annual Festival of Films from Iran (2006).

== Non-film work ==
Zandi put together a book called You Were so Kind!, a collection of children’s letters and drawings based on the 2003 earthquake in Bam, Iran. According to Iranica Online, the earthquake had “the highest casualty rate and the most profound social impact in the recorded post-1900 history of devastating urban earthquakes in Iran.”

== Awards and nominations ==
Zandi won the Crystal Simorgh Special Jury Prize for On a Friday Afternoon in February 2006 at the 24th Fajr International Film Festival in Tehran, Iran. The film also received the Silver Alexander Special Jury award at the 47th Thessaloniki International Film Festival in November of 2006.

== Filmography ==
- 1998 – Secret of a View
- 2000 – Photo without a Frame
- 2002 – Bakhtayar's Coloring Pencils
- 2006 – On a Friday Afternoon
- 2019 – African Violet
