= Hamid Khozouie Abyane =

Iranian cinematographer

- Born: 9 May 1963 (age 62); Tehran, Iran
- Occupation: cinematographer

Hamid Khozouie Abyane (born 9 May 1963) is an Iranian cinematographer. He is one of the most decorated cinematographers in contemporary Iranian cinema, winning multiple Simorgh awards for his work.

== Films ==
- 2019 – Gholamreza Takhti
- 2017 – Simulation
- 2014 – BIGANEH
- 2011 – YE HABE GHAND
- 2011 – INJA BEDOONE MAN
- 2010 – PARSE DAR MEH
- 2010 – MOLKE SOLEIMAN
- 2007 – PA BERAHNE DAR BEHESHT
- 2005 – KHEILI DOUR, KHEILI NAZDIK
- 2005 – KHABGAH-E DOKHTARAN
- 2004 – MARMOULAK
- 2002 – PARANDEH BAZ-E KOUCHAK
- 2002 – INJA CHERAGHI ROSHAN AST (Here, a Shining Light; Crystal Simorgh Award at the Fajr International Film Festival
- 2001 – ZIR-E NOOR-E MAAH (Under the Moonlight; Fajr International Film Festival)
- 2000 – KOUDAK VA SARBAZ (The Child and the Soldier; Three Continents Festival in Nantes)
