= Hamed Behdad =

Iranian actor and singer (born 1973)

- حامد بهداد
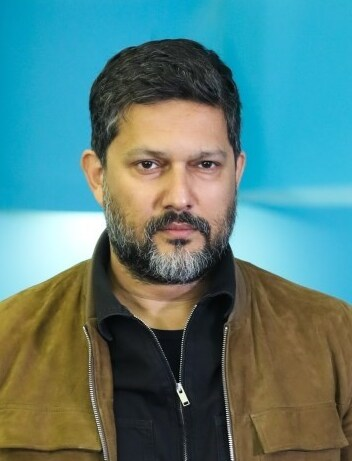
- Behdad, 2024
- Born: November 17, 1973 (age 52); Mashhad, Iran
- Occupations: Actor; singer
- Years active: 2000–present
- Website: Official website

Hamed Behdad (Persian: حامد بهداد; born November 17, 1973) is an Iranian actor and singer. He has received various accolades, including a Crystal Simorgh, a Hafez Award, an Iran Cinema Celebration Award and two Iran's Film Critics and Writers Association Awards. He won the Golden Goblet Award for Best Actor at the 2019 Shanghai International Film Festival for his role in Castle of Dreams (2019).

== Early life ==
Hamed Behdad was born on 17 November 1973 in Mashhad, Iran. In his youth, he lived in Mashhad, Tehran, and Nishabur before returning with his family to Mashhad as a high school freshman.

Behdad received a bachelor's degree in Fine Arts Acting from Islamic Azad University of Tehran, Iran.

== Career ==
Behdad's first role was in the film End of Game, for which he was nominated for Crystal Simorgh for Best Actor at the Fajr Film Festival.

He has subsequently performed in a number of supporting roles in Iranian Cinema.

Behdad played as an Iraqi army officer in the movie Third Day in 2006. In this role, he falls in love with an Iranian girl who lives in Khoramshahr, where it was in the siege of Iraq at that time. He was again nominated for a Crystal Simorgh at the 25th Fajr Film Festival. The role in drew positive attention from a number of filmmakers and critics.

For his performance in the film No One Knows About Persian Cats, directed by Bahman Ghobadi, Behdad received access to the Cannes Film Festival.

He received Crystal Simorgh Prize for Best Supporting Actor for his performance in the film Crime, directed by Masoud Kimiai, at the 29th Fajr Film Festival.

Behdad has also received critical acclaim for his performances in films such as Boutique, Third Day, No One Knows About Persian Cats, Felicity Land, Crime, Hard Makeup, It Happened at Midnight, Blockage and Castle of Dreams.

Over the course of his career, Behdad has had opportunities to collaborate with many prolific Iranian film directors, such as Abbas Kiyarostami, Naser Taghvai, Masoud Kimiai, and Dariush Mehrjui. Some of these projects have yet released.

== Filmography ==
=== Film ===
Year	Title	Role	Director	Notes
2001	The End of Game	Pouya Sadeghi	Homayoun As'adian	Nominated – Crystal Simorgh Fajr Film Festival Award for Best Actor
2003	The Woman Keeps Silent	Soroush	Ahmad Amini	
2004	Boutique	Mehrdad	Hamid Nematollah	Nominated – Iran Cinema Celebration Award for Best Supporting Actor
2006	Cafe Setareh	Khosrow	Saman Moghaddam	Nominated – Hafez Award for Best Actor Motion Picture Nominated – Iran Cinema Celebration Award for Best Supporting Actor
2006	5 P.M Ferdous Park	Bahram	Siamak Shayeghi	
2007	Adam	Sehat Mohebat	Abdolreza Kahani	
2007	The Third Day	Foad	Mohammad Hossein Latifi	Nominated – Crystal Simorgh Fajr Film Festival Award for Best Supporting Actor Won – Hafez Award for Best Actor Motion Picture Nominated – Iran Cinema Celebration Award for Best Actor
2008	Hidden Feeling	Bahram Toloui	Mostafa Razagh Karimi	Nominated – Iran Cinema Celebration Award for Best Supporting Actor
2008	Tambourine	Peugeot 206 Driver	Parisa Bakhtavar	
2008	Layla's Majnun	Hedayat	Ghasem Jafari	
2008	Two Solutions for One Problem		Ghasem Jafari	
2009	The Day Goes and the Night Comes	Siavash Kasrai	Omid Bonakdar, Keyvan Alimohammadi	Nominated – Iran Cinema Celebration Award for Best Supporting Actor
2009	Every Night, Loneliness	Hamid Rahmani	Rasul Sadr Ameli	
2009	Bleeding Heart	Emad	Mohammad Reza Rahmani	
2009	Trial on the Street	Habib	Masoud Kimiai	
2009	A Man Who Ate His Cherries		Peyman Haghani	Cameo
2009	The Third Wave	Babak	Arash Sajadi Hosseini	
2009	No One Knows About Persian Cats	Nader	Bahman Ghobadi	
2010
2010	Pay Back	Hamid	Tahmineh Milani	
2010	Assassin	Hamid Zahedi	Reza Karimi	
2010	Life with Closed Eyes	Ali Fakhar	Rasul Sadr Ameli	
2010	Elixir And Dust	Haj Mohsen	Abbas Rafei	Nominated – Iran's Film Critics and Writers Association Award for Best Supporting Actor
2010	Please Do Not Disturb	Repairman	Mohsen Abdolvahab	
2010	Seven Minutes Until Autumn	Farhad	Alireza Amini	Nominated – Crystal Simorgh Fajr Film Festival Award for Best Supporting Actor Nominated – Hafez Award for Best Actor Motion Picture Nominated – Iran Cinema Celebration Award for Best Actor
2011	Wakefulness	Mohammad	Farzad Motamen	
2011	Non-profit Graveyard	Captain	Mohsen Damadi	Cameo
2011	At the End of 8th Street	Moosa	Alireza Amini	Nominated – Iran Cinema Celebration Award for Best Supporting Actor
2011	Blood Orange	Siavash Khodabandeh	Sirus Alvand	
2011	Crime	Naser	Masoud Kimiai	Won – Crystal Simorgh Fajr Film Festival Award for Best Supporting Actor
2011	Felicity Land	Mohsen Tanbakooi	Maziar Miri	Nominated – Iran's Film Critics and Writers Association Award for Best Actor
2012	Bita Is Restless	Amir	Mehrdad Farid	
2012	The Last Step		Ali Mosaffa	Cameo
2012	The Orange Suit	Hamed Aban	Dariush Mehrjui	
2013	The Fourth Child	Ebrahim	Vahid Mousaian	
2013	Good to Be Back	Dr. Farzad Matin	Dariush Mehrjui	
2014	Hard Makeup	Masoud	Hamid Nematollah	Nominated – Crystal Simorgh Fajr Film Festival Award for Best Actor Nominated – Hafez Award for Best Actor Motion Picture Nominated – Iran Cinema Celebration Award for Best Actor Nominated – Iran's Film Critics and Writers Association Award for Best Actor
2014	Life Is Elsewhere	Davood	Manouchehr Hadi	
2014	The Girl's House	Mansour	Shahram Shah Hosseini	Nominated – Iran's Film Critics and Writers Association Award for Best Actor Won – Iranian Film Festival Australia Award for Best Actor
2015	There Will Be Blood on Wednesday	Morteza	Hamase Parsa	
2016	Never		Hadi Moghadamdoost	
2016	7 Months Pregnant	Mehrdad	Hatef Alimardani	
2016	It Happened at Midnight	Hossein	Tina Pakravan	Nominated – Iran Cinema Celebration Award for Best Actor
2017	Blockage	Ghasem	Mohsen Gharaie	Nominated – Hafez Award for Best Actor Motion Picture Won – Iran Cinema Celebration Award for Best Actor Won – Iran's Film Critics and Writers Association Award for Best Actor Nominated – Urban International Film Festival Award for Best Actor Won – Malaysia International Film Festival Award for Best Actor
2018	Sly	Ghodratollah Samadi	Kamal Tabrizi	Won – Cine-Iran Festival of Toronto Award for Best Actor
2019	Alive	Naeem	Hossein Amiri Doomari, Pedram Pouramiri	
2019	Castle of Dreams	Jalal	Reza Mirkarimi	Nominated – Crystal Simorgh Fajr Film Festival Award for Best Actor Nominated – Hafez Award for Best Actor Motion Picture Won – Iran Cinema Celebration Award for Best Actor Won – Iran's Film Critics and Writers Association Award for Best Actor Won – Shanghai International Film Festival Golden Goblet Award for Best Actor Nominated – Asian Film Award for Best Actor Nominated – Urban International Film Festival Award for Best Actor Won – Cyrus International Film Festival Award for Best Actor Won – Antalya Golden Orange Film Festival Award for Best International Actor
2021	Punch Drunk	Hassan Khoshnood	Adel Tabrizi	Won – Iran International FICTS Festival Award for Best National Actor in a Feature Film
2024	The Old Bachelor	Ali Bastani	Oktay Baraheni	
2024	Go Free	Houman	Adel Tabrizi	
2024	For Rana	Aref	Iman Yazdi	
2025	Setareh's Husband	Younes	Ebrahim Irajzad	
2025	Juliet and the King	Malek Jahan Khanom (voice)	Ashkan Rahgozar	Animation
2025	Red Shades		Hossein Mahkam	
TBA	Bob Marley		Davood Khayambazi	Post-production

=== Web ===
Year	Title	Role	Director	Platform
2016	Golden Tooth	Bolbol / Atash	Davood Mirbagheri	Video CD
2019–2020	Heart	Arash Sepanta	Manouchehr Hadi	Filimo, Namava
2021	I Want to Live	Amir Shaygan	Sharam Shah Hosseini	Filimo
2023	Vertigo	Peyman Pouyesh	Behrang Tofighi	Namava
2023	Turkish Coffee	Danial Azin	Alireza Amini	Filmnet
2026	The Heartless	Parham	Kamal Tabrizi	Filmnet

=== Television ===
Year	Title	Role	Director	Notes	Network
2000	Fellow Traveler	Siamak	Ghasem Jafari	TV series	IRIB TV3
2002	Searching in the City	Guilty	Hassan Hedayat	TV series	IRIB TV5
2005	Sun's Shadow	Reza	Mohammad Reza Ahanj	TV series	IRIB TV3
2008	One Fist of Eagle Feather	Amir Hossein Daneshvar	Asghar Hashemi	TV series	IRIB TV1
2009	The Last Invitation	Emad Khalili	Hossein Soheilizadeh	TV series	IRIB TV2
2011	Free Fall	Major Amir Saberi	Alireza Amini	TV series	IRIB TV1
2015	My Sky	Mohsen	Mohammad Reza Ahanj	TV series	IRIB Ofogh
2015–2016	Kimia	Mohammad Jahan Ara	Javad Afshar	TV series	IRIB TV2
2015	Red Hat 94	Himself	Iraj Tahmasb	TV program	IRIB TV2
