= Breath (2016 film) =

- International poster
- Directed by: Narges Abyar
- Screenplay by: Narges Abyar
- Produced by: Mohammad Hosein Gashemi; Abouzar Pourmohammadi
- Starring: Mehran Ahmadi; Pantea Panahiha; Gelareh Abbasi; Shabnam Moghaddami; Jamshid Hashempour; Sareh Nour Mousavi
- Narrated by: Sareh Nour Mousavi
- Cinematography: Saed Nikzat
- Edited by: Sajjad Pahlevanzadeh
- Music by: Massoud Sakhavatdoost
- Release date: February 1, 2016 (FIFF)
- Running time: 112 minutes
- Country: Iran
- Language: Persian

Breath (Persian: نفس; Nafas) is a 2016 Iranian fantasy drama film directed by Narges Abyar. It was selected as the Iranian entry for the Best Foreign Language Film at the 90th Academy Awards, but it was not nominated.

== Plot ==
Bahar grew up in Yazd during the 1970s and 1980s, surrounded by folklore and literature. During this period, Iran experienced significant political upheaval: the Shah was overthrown, Ayatollah Khomeinicame to power, and the Iran–Iraq War began. Over the following years, Bahar increasingly turned to daydreaming and her imagination as a way of understanding the suffering caused by human conflict.

== Awards and nominations ==
- The Best Director award at 2016 Tallinn Black Nights Film Festival - Narges Abyar
- The Best Supporting Actress in 34th Fajr Film Festival - Shabnam Moghaddami

Music by Massoud Sakhavatdoost

== See also ==
- List of submissions to the 90th Academy Awards for Best Foreign Language Film
- List of Iranian submissions for the Academy Award for Best Foreign Language Film
- Track 143 (2014 film)
