= 38th Fajr Film Festival =

Film festival in Iran

- Opening film: 3 Puffs by Saman Salur
- Closing film: The Feast of The Goat by Saeed Zamanian
- Location: Milad Tower
- Founded: 1983
- No. of films: 51 films
- Festival date: Opening: February 1, 2020; Closing: February 11, 2020
- Website: Fajr Film Festival

Fajr Film Festival
- 39th 37th

38th Fajr Film Awards
- Date: February 11, 2020
- Site: Milad Tower, Tehran, Tehran Province, Iran
- Organised by: Farabi Cinema Foundation; Ministry of Culture and Islamic Guidance

Highlights
- Most awards: Drown, Day Zero (5)
- Most nominations: Drown (12)
- Best Film: Sun Children
- Special Jury Prize: Saeid Malekan (director) – Day Zero
- Audience Choice of Best Film: Drown
- Website: Fajr Film Festival

The 38th Fajr Film Festival (Persian: سی و هشتمین جشنواره فیلم فجر) was held from 1 to 11 February 2020 in Tehran, Iran. The nominees for the 38th Fajr Film Festival were announced on February 10, 2020, at a press conference.

== Jury ==
=== Main Competition ===
- Narges Abyar
- Touraj Aslani
- Abbas Blondie
- Reza Pour Hossein
- Fereydoun Jeyrani
- Saeed Rad
- Mohammad Mehdi Asgarpour
- Tahmaseb Solhjoo
- Maziar Miri

=== First Look, Short Film, Documentary ===
- Mehdi Jafari
- Rouhollah Hejazi
- Mostafa Razagh Karimi
- Fereshteh Taerpour
- Hadi Moghadamdoost

=== Advertising Competition ===
- Mohammad Rouhollamin
- Amir Sheiban Khaghani
- Habib Majidi

== Winners and nominees ==
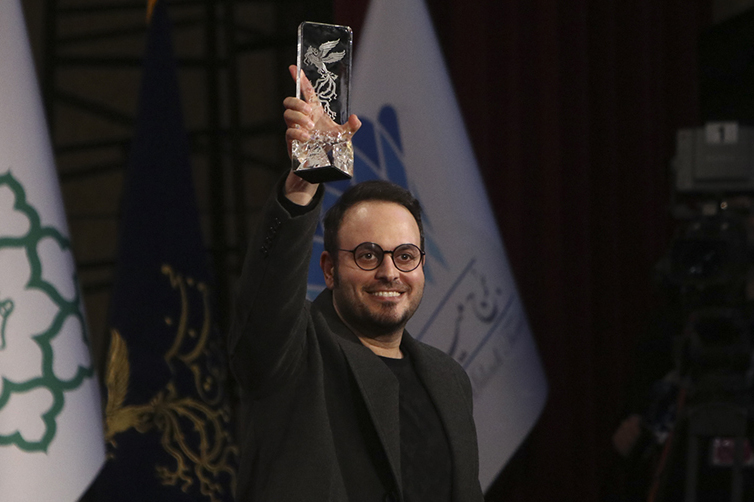
Mohammad Hossein Mahdavian, Best Director winner

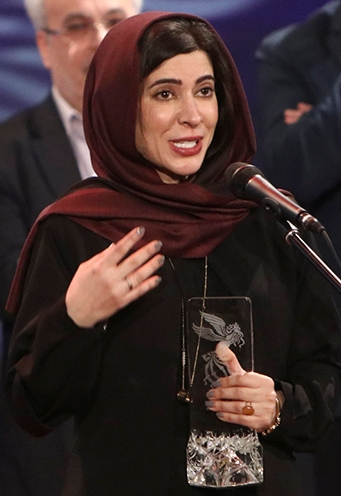
Nazanin Ahmadi, Best Actress winner

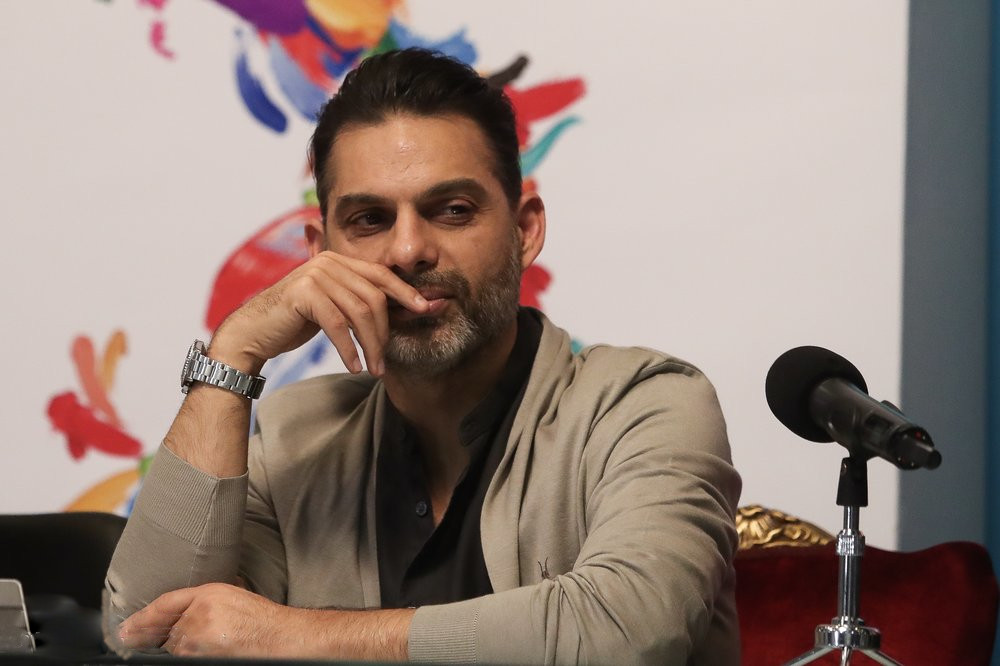
Payman Maadi, Best Actor winner

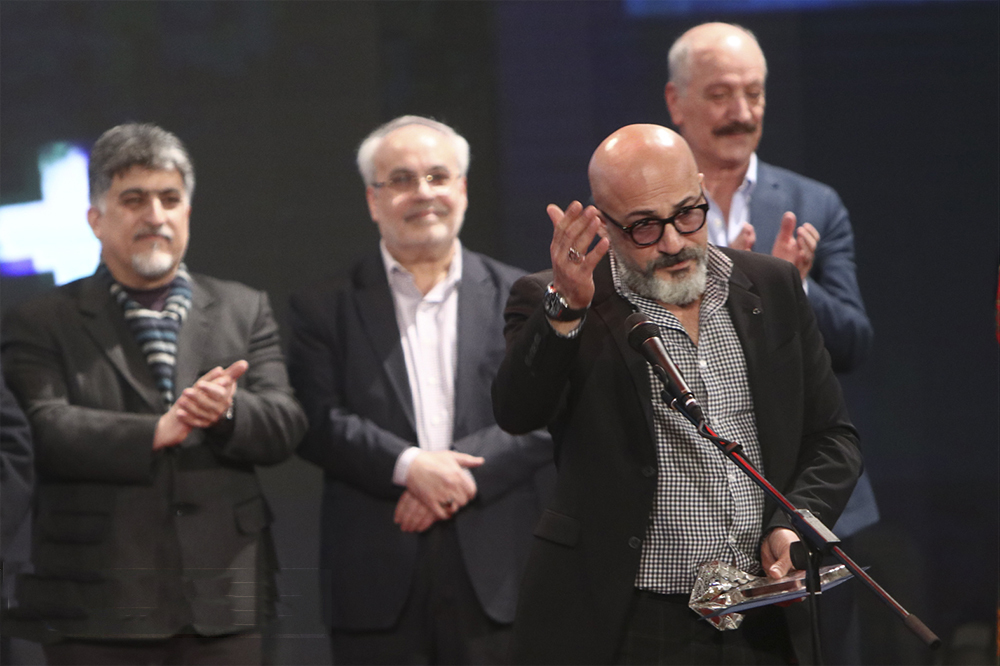
Amir Aghaei, Best Supporting Actor winner

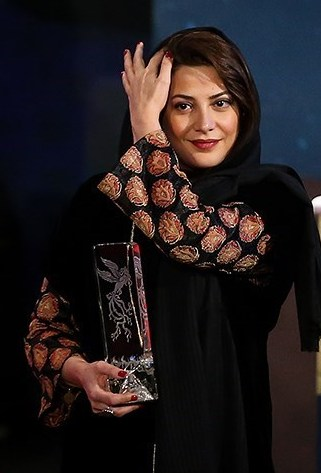
Tannaz Tabatabaei, Best Supporting Actress winner

=== Main Competition ===
Best Director	Best Film
Mohammad Hossein Mahdavian – Walnut Tree; Majid Majidi – Sun Children; Niki Karimi – Atabai; Morteza Farshbaf – Tooman; Saeid Malekan – Day Zero; Mohammad Kart – Drown	Sun Children; Walnut Tree; Atabai; Day Zero; Drown
Best Actress	Best Actor
Nazanin Ahmadi – The Rain Falls Where It Will as Sara; Parinaz Izadyar – 3 Puffs as Nasim; Maryam Moqadam – Ballad of a White Cow as Mina; Neda Jebraeili – Drowning in Holy Water as Setareh; Elnaz Shakerdoost – I'm Scared as	Payman Maadi – Walnut Tree as Ghader Molanpour; Mirsaeed Molavian – Tooman as Davood; Faramarz Gharibian – Exodus as Rahmat; Amir Jadidi – Day Zero as Reza / Siavash; Ali Shadman – Drowning in Holy Water as Sohrab
Best Supporting Actress	Best Supporting Actor
Tannaz Tabatabaei – Drown as Parvaneh; Leila Zare – There Was Blood as Fatemeh; Minoo Sharifi – Walnut Tree as Maryam; Samira Hassanpour – 3 Puffs as Fariba Mirhadi; Setareh Pesyani – I'm Scared as; Baran Kosari – Popular as Afsaneh Shirkhodai	Amir Aghaei – Drown as Hashem; Javad Ezzati – Atabai as Yahya; Arshia Nikbin – The Rain Falls Where It Will as; Mojtaba Pirzadeh – Tooman as Aziz; Babak Karimi – Shahre Gheseh Cinema as
Best Cinematography: Morteza Najafi – Tooman; Saman Lotfian – Atabai; Saman Lotfian – Drown; Masoud Amini Tirani – The Rain Falls Where It Will; Hooman Behmanesh – Sun Children; Masoud Salami – 3 Puffs	Best Screenplay: Nima Javidi, Majid Majidi – Sun Children; Saeid Malekan, Bahram Tavakoli – Day Zero; Mohammad Kart, Hossein Doomari, Pedram Pouramiri – Drown; Behtash Sanaeeha, Maryam Moqadam, Mehrdad Kouroshnia – Ballad of a White Cow; Ali Zarnegar – Bone Marrow; Behnam Behzadi, Sahar Sakhai – I'm Scared
Best Original Score	Best Editor
Bamdad Afshar – Skin; Hossein Alizadeh – Atabai; Ramin Kousha – Sun Children; Habib Khazaeifar – Walnut Tree; Masoud Sekhavatdoust – Drown	Esmaeil Alizade – Drown; Mohammad Najarian – Skin; Mohammad Najarian – Walnut Tree; Hassan Hassandoost – Sun Children; Maysam Molaei – Day Zero; Siavash Pourkhalili – Shahre Gheseh Cinema
Best Sound Effects	Best Sound Recording
Arash Ghasemi – Drown; Alireza Alavian – Skin; Amin Sharifi – Tooman; Arash Ghasemi – Exodus; Mohammad Reza Delpak – Sun Children	Mehdi Salehkermani – Drown; Amir Shahordi – Skin; Rashid Daneshmand – Tooman; Amir Nobakht – Exodus; Hossein Bashash – Sun Children
Best Production Design	Best Costume Design
Keyvan Moghaddam – Sun Children; Pouria Akhavan – Skin; Mohamadreza Shojaei – Walnut Tree; Soheil Danesheshraghi – Day Zero; Aydin Zarif – Shahre Gheseh Cinema	Amir Malekpour – Day Zero; Rasoul Alizadeh – Skin; Maral Jeyrani – Exodus; Behzad Jafari Tadi – Walnut Tree; Sheideh Mohammadzadeh – Shahre Gheseh Cinema; Ghazaleh Motamed – Drown
Best Special Effects	Best Makeup
Mohsen Roozbahani – Day Zero; Arash Aghabeik – Skin; Arash Aghabeik – Drown; Iman Karamian – Sun Children; Iman Karamian – Butterfly Stroke	Mehrdad Mirkiani – Exodus; Mohammadreza Ghomi – There Was Blood; Shahram Khalaj – Walnut Tree; Iman Omidvari – 3 Puffs; Azim Farain – Drown
Audience Choice of Best Film	Best Visual Effects
Rasul Sadr Ameli – Drown	Mohammad Baradaran – Exodus; Javad Matoori – Abadan 11 60; Javad Matoori – Sun Children; Amin Pahlavanzadeh, Kamyar Shafiepour – Walnut Tree; Reza Misaghi, Mohsen Kheirabadi – Day Zero
Special Jury Prize	Best National Film
Saeid Malekan – Day Zero; Rouhollah Zamani, Shamila Shirzad, Abolfazl Shirzad, Seyyed Mohammad Mehdi Mousavifard – Sun Children (Honorary Diploma)	Saeid Malekan – Day Zero
Sardar Soleimani Award	Best Art & Experience Film
Abadan 11 60 – Hassan Kalami	Ark Brothers – Skin
Best Documentary	Best Short Film
No Place for Angels; Lady; The Marriage Project; It Is Winter	Dabur; Exam; Alley

=== First Look ===
Best First Film
- Day Zero
  - Soundless
  - Skin
  - Drown
  - The Undercover

=== Advertising Competition ===
Best Poster Design	Best Still Photography
Mohammad Taghi Pour – 23 People; Ali Bagheri – Women With Gunpowder Earrings; Mohammad Hossein Houshmandi – The Paternal House; Mohammad Shakiba – Swear; Mohammad Taghi Pour – Mahin	Maryam Takhtkeshian – Gholamreza Takhti; Fatah Zei Nouri – Rona, Azim's Mother; Majid Talebi – Midday Adventures: Trace of Blood; Masoud Ashtari – A Hairy Tale; Amirhossein Shojaei – Just 6.5
Best Trailer
Amir Mirzai – King Slayer; Zeinabollsadat Badri – The Lost Paradise; Mohammad Mehdi Mohammadi – Swear; Morteza Movahadi – Gholamreza Takhti; Masoud Rafizadeh – Dance With Me

=== Films with multiple wins ===
Wins	Films
5	Drown
5	Day Zero
3	Sun Children
2	Walnut Tree
2	Exodus
2	Skin

=== Films with multiple nominations ===
Nominations	Films
12	Drown
11	Walnut Tree
10	Sun Children
9	Day Zero
6	Skin
5	Tooman
5	Atabai
5	Exodus
4	3 Puffs
4	Shahre Gheseh Cinema
3	The Rain Falls Where It Will
3	I'm Scared
2	Abadan 11 60
2	Drowning in Holy Water
2	There Was Blood
2	Ballad of a White Cow
2	Bone Marrow

== Films ==
=== Main Competition ===
Title	Director
Abadan 11 60	Mehrdad Khoshbakht
Atabai	Niki Karimi
The Night	Kourosh Ahari
The Rain Falls Where It Will	Majid Barzegar
Filicide	Mohammad Hadi Karimi
Skin	Ark Brothers
Tooman	Morteza Farshbaf
Exodus	Ebrahim Hatamikia
The Good, the Bad, the Corny 2: Secret Army	Peyman Ghasemkhani
Sun Children	Majid Majidi
There Was Blood	Masoud Kimiai
Walnut Tree	Mohammad Hossein Mahdavian
Amphibious	Borzou Niknejad
The Day of the Riot	Behrouz Shoeibi
Day Zero	Saeid Malekan
3 Puffs	Saman Salur
Shahre Gheseh Cinema	Keyvan Alimohammad, Aliakbar Heydari
Drown	Mohammad Kart
Popular	Soheil Beyraghi
Ballad of a White Cow	Behtash Sanaeeha
Drowning in Holy Water	Navid Mahmoudi
Bone Marrow	Hamid Ghorbani
I'm Scared	Behnam Behzadi

=== First Look ===
Title	Director
The Night	Kourosh Ahari
Soundless	Behrang Dezfoulizadeh
Fathers	Salem Salavati
Skin	Ark Brothers
Enemies	Ali Derakhshandeh
Day Zero	Saeid Malekan
Conflict	Mohammad Reza Lotfi
Drown	Mohammad Kart
Slaughterhouse	Abbas Amini
The Undercover	Amir Abbas Rabiei

=== Documentary ===
Title	Director
Lady	Mohammad Habibi Mansour
The Marriage Project	Hesam Eslami, Atieh Attarzadeh Firozabad
No Place for Angels	Sam Kalantari
Lunar Eclipse	Mohsen Ostadali
The Narrow Red Line	Farzad Khoshdast
It Is Winter	Mehrdad Zahedian
Living Among the Flags of War	Mohsen Eslamzadeh
Excellency	Sajad Imani
The story of Forough girls	Khatereh Hanachi
Kill Mehdi Araghi	Abdolreza Nematollahi

=== Short film ===
Title	Director
The Rubbish	Ali Azizi
Exam	Sonia K. Hadad
White Wandering Snows	Mohamadreza Vatandoust
Red Panda	Ali Paknia
Dabur	Saeed Nejati
Dragon's Tail	Saeed Keshavarz
The Feast of The Goat	Saeed Zamanian
Aziz	Seyyed Mehdi Mousavi Barzaki
Alley	Mohammad Reza Mesbah
Snowy Mother	Marjan Khosravi

=== Out of competition ===
Title	Director
Killer Spider	Ebrahim Irajzad
Sheen	Meysam Kazazi
