= Martin Shamoonpour =

Iraninan composer and actor

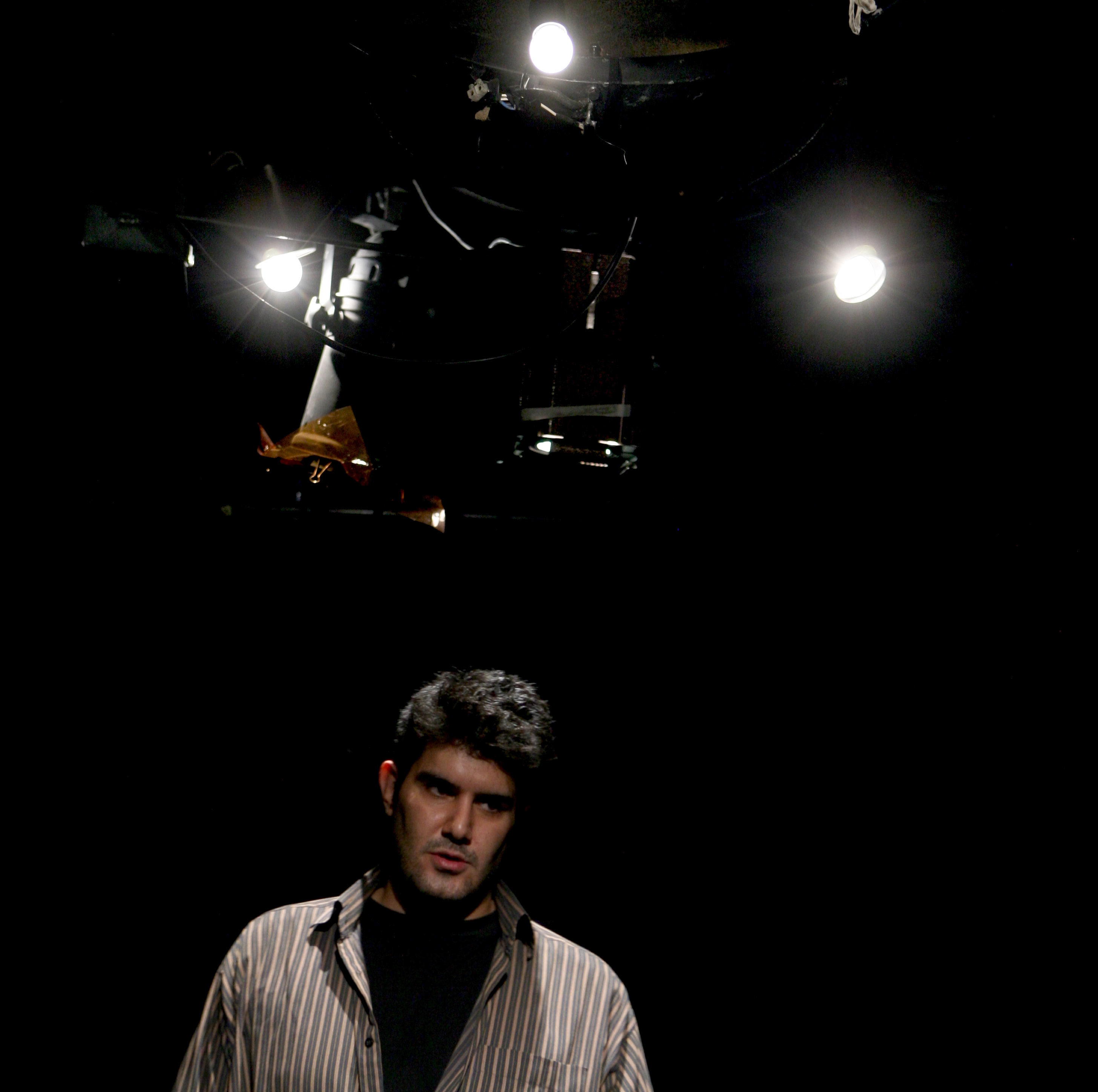
- Born: 1984 April; Tehran, Iran
- Occupations: actor and composer
- Website: https://martinshamoon.com

Martin Shamoonpour is an autodidactic multi-instrumentalist, composer, actor, and visual artist from Tehran. He was born in 1984 in an Assyrian family. One of the most important works of Martin Shamoonpour in the field of music is the publication of sermon on the mount, Tehransaranieh, 8 Bit and Ear Magazines. He has also worked as a composer and sound designer in more than thirty theater performances. Acting in films such as Dying in September, Melbourne, Bending The Rules and the sound of slow. In addition to being an actor, Martin Shamoonpour is also a composer in cinema and television. The most important works of Martin Shamoonpour as a composer are The Rule of Accident, the TV series Salam Taxi and the first season of the TV series Khandvane.

== Excerpts from theatrical music ==
- Les Justes, Director: Amir Hossein Hariri, February 2005
- Sowdadokht, Director: Talieh Tarighi, Fall 2007
- An Out of Tune symphony, Director: Atila Pesyani, December 2007
- Rashōmon, Director: Kobra Dabiri, April 2008
- My dear father, director: Mohammad Hassan Madjooni, summer 2008
- Where were you on January 8? Director: Amir Reza Koohestani, December 2009
- In a Grove, Director: Javad Namaki, Fajr Theater Festival 1389
- Woman from the Past, Director: Mohammad Aghebati, August and September 2011
- Tehran, Director: Mahan Charmshir, June 2012
- Avaye Gel, Director: Yaser Khaseb, August and September 2012
- Dechlorination, Director: Mehdi Koushki, September and October 2012
- Silence Dolls, Director: Samaneh Zandinejad, Fajr Theater Festival 2013

== Acting ==
- The play by Dr. Shakil and Mr High, Writer: Martin Shamoonpour, Director: Pantea Bahram, Entezami Theater, 2012
- Bending The Rules, Director: Behnam Behzadi, 2013
- Mother Courage, The Man Outside, writer and director: Sajad Afsharian, Hafez Hall 2013
- Dying in September, Director: Hatef Alimardani, 2013
- Melbourne, Director: Nima Javidi, 2013
- Slow Sound, Director: Afshin Hashemi, 2014
- The Jungle, Director: Stephen Daldry, St. Ann’s Warehouse December 2018
