= Rainy Season =

The rainy season is the time of year when most of a region's average annual rainfall occurs.

Rainy Season may also refer to:

- Rainy Season (short story), a 1989 short horror story by Stephen King
- "Rainy Season", a 2018 song by Monni
- The Rainy Season, a 1993 album by Marc Cohn
- The Rainy Season, a 1999 novel by James Blaylock
- Rainy Seasons (film), a 2010 Iranian film
