= Boarding Pass =

- Film poster
- Directed by: Mehdi Rahmani
- Written by: Amir Arabi; Babak Mirzakhani; Mehdi Rahmani
- Produced by: Bahman Kamyar; Mehdi Rahmani
- Starring: Neda Jebraeili; Mansour Shahbazi; Mohammad Ali Najafian; Asghar Rafijam; Shirin Yazdanbakhsh; Tala Motazedi; Bardia Hosseini
- Cinematography: Mohammad Rasouli
- Edited by: Mohammad Reza Mouyini
- Music by: Babak Mirzakhani
- Production company: Green Road Films
- Distributed by: Cinando
- Release dates: October 15, 2017 (Warsaw Film Festival); May 22, 2019 (Iran)
- Running time: 90 minutes
- Country: Iran
- Language: Persian

Boarding Pass (Persian: کارت پرواز, romanized: Kart-e Parvaz) is a 2017 Iranian drama film directed by Mehdi Rahmani and written by Rahmani, Amir Arabi and Babak Mirzakhani. The film screened for the first time at the 33rd Warsaw Film Festival.

== Cast ==
- Neda Jebraeili as Neda
- Mansour Shahbazi as Mansour
- Mohammad Ali Najafian
- Asghar Rafijam as Doctor
- Shirin Yazdanbakhsh as Old Woman
- Tala Motazedi
- Bardia Hosseini as Bardia
