= Nazanin Ahmadi =

Iranian actress

- نازنین احمدی
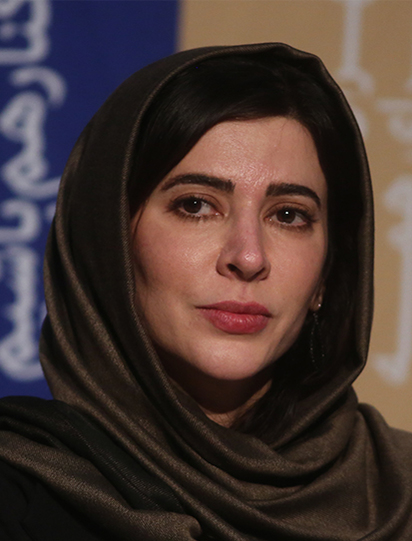
- Ahmadi at the 2020 Fajr Film Festival
- Born: Tehran, Iran
- Education: University of Tehran
- Occupation: Actress
- Years active: 2008–present

Nazanin Ahmadi (Persian: نازنین احمدی) is an Iranian actress. She has received various accolades, including a Crystal Simorgh, in addition to nomination for an Iran's Film Critics and Writers Association Award.

== Filmography ==
=== Film ===
Year	Title	Role	Director	Notes	Ref(s)
2008	Three Women	Grandmother's youth	Manijeh Hekmat		
2012	Cold Ground	Bride	Ali Pour Issa	Short film	
2015	Wish's Zero Point		Arash Mashverat	Short film	
2016	A Movie for You		Iman Behrouzi	Short film	
2017	The Room		Fereshte Arastouie	Short film	
2017	The Return		Hamid Reza Mazrae Khatiri	Short film	
2017	Discharged	The Wife	Azadeh Moussavi	Short film	
2017	Snowman	Marjan	Roodabeh Izadi	Short film	
2017	Disappearance		Ali Asgari		
2018	The Woman That I Was		Azadeh Moussavi	Short film	
2018	Bigoudi		Arash Mashverat	Short film	
2019	Knock Out		Gholamreza Ramezani		
2020	Someone Is Breathing Within Me		Masoud Tahmasebi	Short film	
2020	The Rain Falls Where It Will	Sara	Majid Barzegar		
2022	Without Anyone		Amirali Radi	Short film	
2022	Simin's Hospitality	Simin	Ali Bana'iyan	Short film	
2022	A Piece of You		Hadi Nouri	Short film	
2024	The Ellipsis Figure		Saeed Heshmati	Short film	
2024	Doodmaan		Alireza Abbasi	Short film	
2025	Setareh's Husband		Ebrahim Irajzad		

=== Television ===
Year	Title	Role	Director	Network	Notes	Ref(s)
2010	The Innocent Ones	Leila	Ahmad Amini	IRIB TV3	TV series	
2020	Molkavan	Marzieh	Ahmad Moazemi	iFilm	TV series	

== Theater ==
Year	Title	Director	Stage	Ref(s)
2016	Diary Notes Roya Pardis	Iman Behrouzi	Iranian Artists Forum	
2018	Rashomon	Reza Kouchak Zadeh	City Theater	
2018	Rainless Days	Amin Behruzi	Shahrzad Theater	
2018	Goodbye My Cherry Orchard	Sara Makhavat	City Theater	
2020	La Femme rompue	Amin Behruzi	Tbilisi	

== Awards and nominations ==
Award	Year	Category	Nominated Work	Result
Fajr Film Festival	2020	Best Actress in a Leading Role	The Rain Falls Where It Will	Won
Iran's Film Critics and Writers Association	2022	Best Actress in a Leading Role	The Rain Falls Where It Will	Nominated
