= Elnaz Shakerdoost =

Iranian actress (born 1984)

- الناز شاکردوست
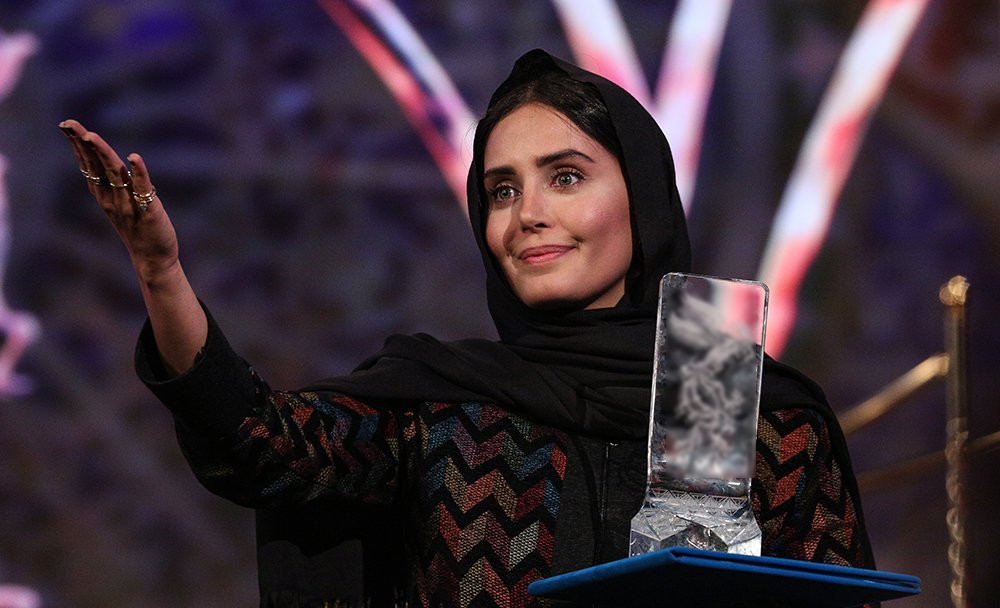
- Shakerdoost at the 2019 Fajr Film Festival
- Born: June 28, 1984 (age 42); Tehran, Iran
- Education: Azad University
- Occupation: Actress
- Years active: 2003–2026

‘’‘Elnaz Shakerdoost’’’ (Persian: الناز شاکردوست; born July 7, 1984) is an Iranian actress. She studied at the Faculty of Architecture at the University of Tehran while pursuing acting in theater. She received a nomination for the Crystal Simorgh for Best Actress at the Fajr Film Festival for her role in ‘‘When the Wind Blows Through the Meadow’’ in 2007 and won the Best Actress award at the Hafez Awards for her performance in ‘‘Mubarak’’ in 2016. Shakerdoost also won the Crystal Simorgh for Best Actress for her role in ‘‘When the Moon Was Full’’ in 2018 and was nominated for the same award for ‘‘Pinto’’, both directed by Narges Abyar.

== Early life ==
Elnaz Shakerdoost was born on July 7, 1984, in Tehran, Iran. She is the second child in her family, with an older brother and a younger sister. From a young age, Shakerdoost showed an interest in acting, performing in school and university theater productions. In 1997, she won the Best Actress award at a student edition of the Fajr Festival. She ranked 11th in the national university entrance exam for the arts and enrolled in the Theater program at the Faculty of Architecture, University of Tehran.

== Controversies ==
Film Scandal

ElNaz Shakerdoost, in an open letter addressed to the media, wrote about her role as Afsaneh in the film Scandal: "I truly lived the role of Afsaneh, and my soul will forever remain tied to this character. My only solace is the hope that the conscience of my homeland, Iran, awakens in time. The reason I took on this role was to echo the sigh of a girl who, after the price of bread rose, turned away from God in anger, left the breadline, and was forced into a life of vice. No one asked what would become of a home left without bread."

Support for the LGBT Community

Following the reported killing of Ali Fazeli Monfared on 4 May 2021, Shakerdoost expressed support for the LGBT community on her Instagram account. She posted a photo of herself with rainbow-colored bangs, a symbol associated with the LGBT movement, accompanied by the following statement:

"Ever since childhood, every story I read began with 'In the name of the merciful God,' but this story has no merciful God. Perhaps He is preoccupied with the massacres we see daily in the media worldwide. The narrative of misogyny and discrimination against sexual minorities is not new in our society—it has taken such deep roots that it has become a profound societal issue, suffocating us. It has brought us to a point where we claim the right to take a life we did not give. Across this land, men and women are killed by their families and loved ones, solely for the most basic human right: the right to choose, to have preferences, to decide their own lives. To be killed by childhood playmates, parents, or loved ones is to die a thousand times. Today, we must stand tall to lift this dark cloud from above us. Today, we will no longer remain silent."

A few days later, following a warning from the Tehran Prosecutor's Office, Shakerdoost was compelled to delete the Instagram post. During this period, media outlets such as Fars News Agency and Mashregh News, which are affiliated with the Islamic Revolutionary Guard Corps, played a significant role in orchestrating campaigns aimed at discrediting Shakerdoost. These outlets referred to her with derogatory labels, such as a "celebrity promoting corruption."

Protest at the 2023 Fajr Film Festival

In February 2023, while attending a screening of the film Without Body at the Kourosh Cinema Complex during the Fajr Film Festival, Elnaz Shakerdoost took the stage minutes before the film's conclusion to voice criticism of the festival's organizers.

2025–2026 Iranian protests

On 2 February 2026, Shakerdoost announced her retirement from acting in protest of the government's response to the 2025–2026 Iranian protests. In 2026, Shakerdoost withdrew from the 44th Fajr Film Festival after her film Single Mum (Aram Bakhsh) was selected for the competition section. She declined to accept the Crystal Simorgh award and stated that her decision was made in protest against the killing of people by agents of the Islamic Republic. The film's writer and director Saeed Zamanian and composer Sohrab Pournazeri had previously announced their withdrawal from the festival.

== Withdrawal from Acting and Legal Pressure ==
In the aftermath of the killing of protesters during Iran’s 2025–2026 Iranian protests, she wrote on her Instagram: To live like this is harder than dying a thousand times. Referring to the Fajr Film Festival, she added: I will not take part in any celebration, nor will I ever again act on a land that smells of blood.

In October 2026, her lawyer Houshang Pourbabaei announced that Branch 36 of the Tehran Appeals Court had upheld a one-year prison sentence and a two-year ban on professional artistic, political, and online activities against Shakerdoost on charges of "propaganda against the regime" following her online statements protesting the crackdown.

== Filmography ==
=== Film ===
Year	Title	Role	Director	Notes
2003	Here Is the End of the World	Golrokh	Ebrahim Bakhshi, Sharareh Yousefinia	
2004	Singles	Zhaleh Poshtkar	Asghar Hashemi	
2005	Online Murder	Leila	Masoud Abparvar	
2005	Ice Flower	Targol	Kiumars Pourahmad	
2005	The Runaway Bride	Sima	Bahram Kazemi	
2006	Who Killed Amir?	Asal	Mehdi Karampour	
2006	How Much You Want to Cry?	Iran	Shahed Ahmadlo	
2006	Unfaithful	Zohreh	Asghar Naimi	
2007	First Move	Sara	Farhad Najafi	
2007	The Rule of the Game	Fereshteh	Ahmad Reza Motamedi	
2007	God Is Close	Leila	Ali Vazirian	
2007	The Night Bus	Reyhaneh	Kiumars Pourahmad	
2008	Layla's Majnun	Parvaneh	Ghasem Jafari	
2008	Among the Clouds	Noora	Rouhollah Hejazi	
2008	Wind Blows in the Meadow	Shooka	Khosrow Masoumi	
2008	Shirin	Woman in audience	Abbas Kiarostami	
2009	The Shell	Roja	Mostafa Al Ahmad	
2009	Bleeding Heart	Delaram	Mohammad Reza Rahmani	
2009	Checkmate	Parisa	Jamshid Heidari	
2010	Smell of Gandom	Gandom	Mohammad Reza Khaki	
2010	Two Sisters	Mina	Mohammad Banki	
2010	Distance	Maryam	Kamran Qadakchian	
2010	The Ungrateful	Anael	Hassan Hedayat	
2010	Hey to Love	Elahe	Asghar Naeemi	
2010	Accusation	Nasim	Mehrdad Farid	
2010	Death Carnival	Nahid	Reza Azamian, Habibollah Kasesaz	
2010	Red Light	Roya / Setareh	Ali Ghafari	
2011	Point of No Return	Sayeh	Sirous Ranjbar	
2011	The First Condition	Nazanin	Masoud Atyabi	
2011	Me and You	Mahshid	Mohammad Banki	
2013	Notoriety	Afsaneh	Masoud Dehnamaki	
2013	Fireworks	Maral	Bahman Goodarzi	
2014	Mobarak	Golpari	Mohammad Reza Najafi Emami	
2014	The King's White Horse	Mary	Mohammad Hossein Latifi	
2015	Taboo	Bahar	Khosrow Masoumi	
2017	Asphyxia	Sahra	Fereydoun Jeyrani	
2018	All Through the Night	Mahta / Maryam	Farzad Motamen	
2019	When the Moon Was Full	Faezeh	Narges Abyar	
2019	The Singer	Ziba	Mostafa Kiaee	
2020	I'm Scared	Nasim	Behnam Behzadi	
2020	TiTi	Titi	Ida Panahandeh	
2021	Pinto	Raheleh	Narges Abyar	
2023	A Relic of the South	Rana	Hossein Amiri Doomari, Pedram Pouramiri	
2023	The Last Birthday	Soraya	Navid Mahmoudi	
2024	Bodiless		Morteza Alizadeh	
2025	Highway Deer		Abolfazl Saffary	
2025	The Crooked Cocoon		Hatef Alimardani	
2026	Single Mum	Aram	Saeed Zamanian	

== Short films ==
Year	Title	Role	Director	Notes
2023	Like a Secret		Saeed Zamanian	

=== Web ===
Year	Title	Role	Director	Platform
2010–2011	Icy Heart	Chista	Mohammad Hossein Latifi	Video CD
2012	Iranian Rally	Herself	Arash Moayerian	Video CD

== Theatre ==
Year	Title	Playwright	Director	Stage	Notes
2017	Lost	Amir Mohandesan, Hadi Ahmadi	Amir Mohandesan	Iranshahr Theater	
2023	Mad's Girl Love Song	Tala Motazedi	Arvand Dashtaray, Marene Van Holk	City Theater of Tehran	

== Awards and nominations ==
Name of the award ceremony, year presented, category, nominee of the award, and the result of the nomination
Award	Year	Category	Nominated Work	Result	Ref(s)
Carcassonne International Political Film Festival	2019	Best Actress	When the Moon Was Full	Won	
Fajr Film Festival	2008	Best Actress in a Leading Role	Wind Blows in the Meadow	Nominated	
Fajr Film Festival	2019	Best Actress in a Leading Role	When the Moon Was Full	Won	
Fajr Film Festival	2020	Best Actress in a Leading Role	I'm Scared	Nominated	
Fajr Film Festival	2021	Best Actress in a Leading Role	Pinto	Nominated	
Hafez Awards	2017	Best Actress – Motion Picture	Mobarak	Won	
Hafez Awards	2018	Best Actress – Motion Picture	Asphyxia	Nominated	
Hafez Awards	2020	Best Actress – Motion Picture	When the Moon Was Full	Won	
Hafez Awards	2023	Best Actress – Motion Picture	Titi	Won	
Hafez Awards	2024	Best Actress – Motion Picture	Bodiless	Won	
Hafez Awards	2025	Best Actress – Motion Picture	The Crooked Cocoon	Nominated	
Iran Cinema Celebration	2005	Best Actress in a Supporting Role	Singles	Nominated	
Iran Cinema Celebration	2006	Best Actress in a Supporting Role	Who Killed Amir?	Nominated	
Iran Cinema Celebration	2008	Best Actress in a Leading Role	Among the Clouds	Nominated	
Iran Cinema Celebration	2018	Best Actress in a Leading Role	Asphyxia	Nominated	
Iran Cinema Celebration	2019	Best Actress in a Leading Role	When the Moon Was Full	Nominated	
Iran's Film Critics and Writers Association	2017	Best Actress in a Leading Role	Asphyxia	Nominated	
Iran's Film Critics and Writers Association	2020	Best Actress in a Leading Role	When the Moon Was Full	Won	
Iran's Film Critics and Writers Association	2022	Best Actress in a Leading Role	Titi	Won	
Iranian Film Festival – San Francisco	2015	Best Actress	Taboo	Won	
Rabat International Film Festival	2022	Best Actress	Titi	Won	
