= Neda Jebraeili =

Iranian actress (born 1990)

- ندا جبرائیلی
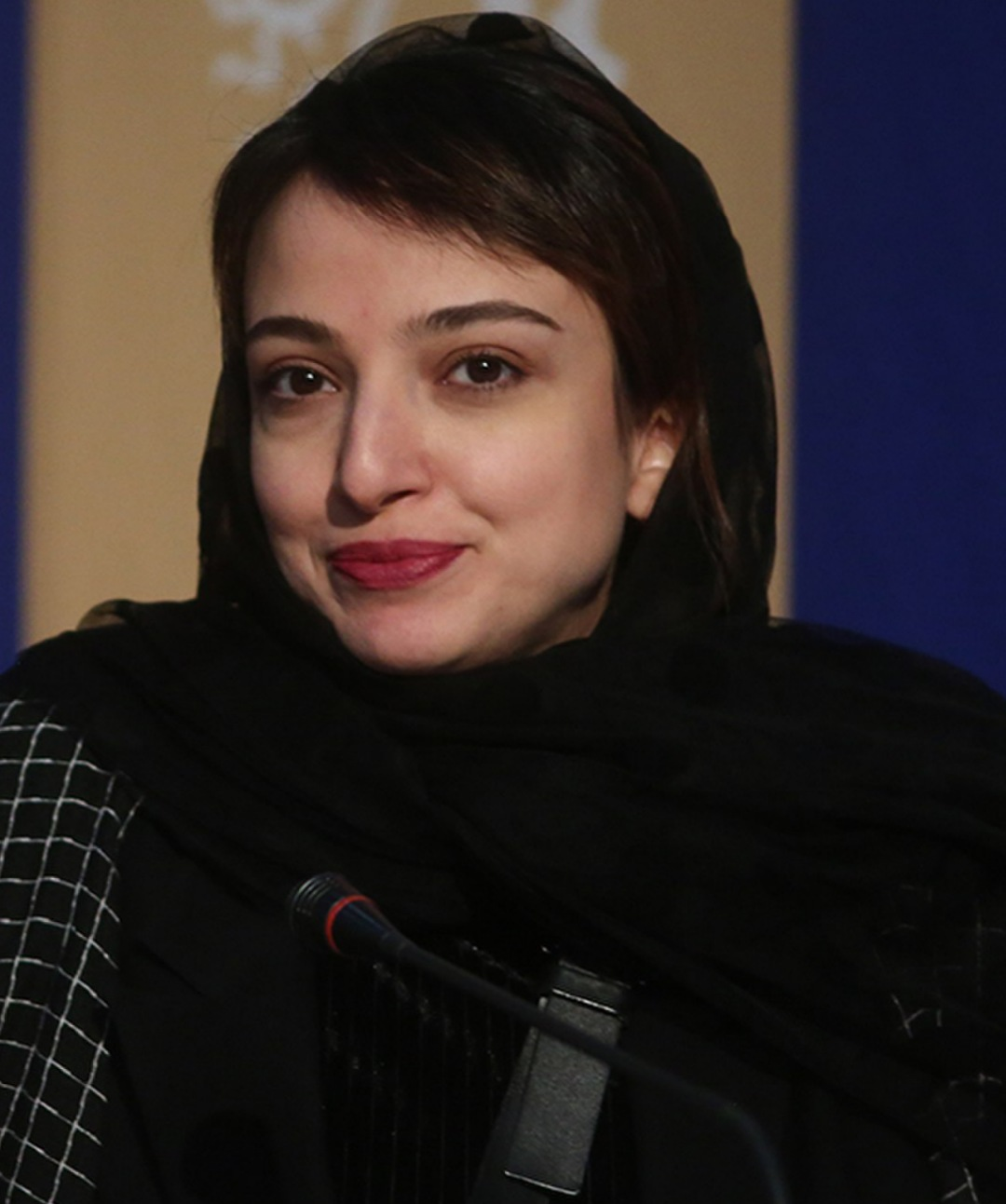
- Jebraeili at the 2020 Fajr Film Festival
- Born: October 7, 1990 (age 36); Tehran, Iran
- Occupation: Actress
- Years active: 2010–present
- Spouse: Aliyar Rasti

Neda Jebraeili (Persian: ندا جبرائیلی; born October 7, 1990) is an Iranian actress. She is best known for her acting in Bending the Rules (2013), Fish & Cat (2013), Boarding Pass (2017), World War III (2022), and Cause of Death: Unknown (2023). Jebraeili received two Crystal Simorgh nominations for her performances in Bending the Rules and Drowning in Holy Water (2020).

== Filmography ==
=== Film ===
Year	Title	Role	Director	Notes	Ref(s)
2010	The Earth Marathon	Golrokh	Kamal Tabrizi		
2013	Bending the Rules	Shahrzad	Behnam Behzadi		
2013	Fish & Cat	Mina	Shahram Mokri		
2013	Atisaz		Arvand Dasht Aray	Short film	
2014	Quadrumvirate		Sahand Kabiri	Short film	
2015	Yahya Didn't Keep Quiet	Leila	Kaveh Ebrahimpour		
2015	Paradise	Narges's mother	Sina Ataeian Dena		
2015	Silent	Sara	Pouya Nabbi	Short film	
2015	Aluminium Phosphide		Amir Hossein Karami	Short film	
2015	9 May 2014		Aslan Shahebrahimi	Short film	
2016	Teal	Nazi	Arman Khansarian	Short film	
2016	Aram	Mahsa	Fereshteh Parnian	Short film	
2017	Boarding Pass	Neda	Mehdi Rahmani		
2017	Reverence		Sogol Rezavani	Short film	
2017	Saghi	Saghi	Alireza Esfandiarnejad	Short film	
2018	In Between	Rana	Aliyar Rasti	Short film	
2019	Jamshidieh	Parastoo	Yalda Jebeli		
2019	African Violet	Fereshteh	Mona Zandi Haghighi	the eighth highest-grossing film of 2020 in Iran	
2019	They Will Come	Saghi	Alireza Esfandiarnezhad	Short film	
2019	Seven and a Half	Shabaneh	Navid Mahmoudi		
2020	Drowning in Holy Water	Setareh	Navid Mahmoudi		
2020	Your Neighbour, Zohreh	Zohreh's daughter	Ali Derakhshandeh		
2021	America	Sara	Aliyar Rasti	Short film	
2022	World War III	Neda Zareh	Houman Seyyedi		
2023	Cause of Death: Unknown	Bahar	Ali Zarnegar		
2023	Two Lives of Sepideh	Sepideh	Soha Niasti	Short film	
2024	Don't Worry About Me		Amin Khojasteh	Short film	

=== Web ===
Year	Title	Role	Director	Platform	Notes	Ref(s)
2026	Yal		Jamshid Mahmoudi	Filmnet	Main role	
2026	The Red and the Black		Ida Panahandeh	Filimo	Main role	

=== Television ===
Year	Title	Role	Director	Network	Notes	Ref(s)
2019	Dear Brother	Leila Serafat	Mohammad Reza Ahanj	IRIB TV3	Main role; 27 episodes	

== Awards and nominations ==
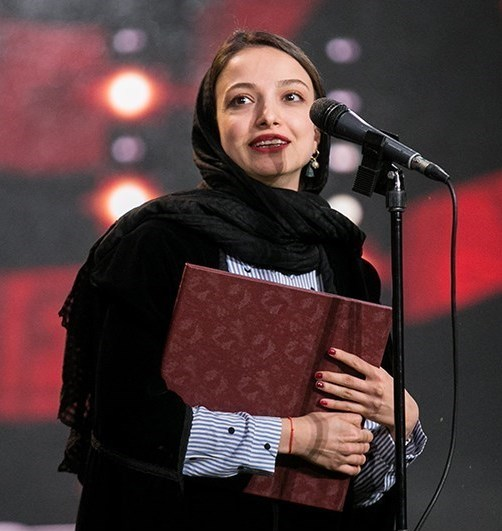
Jebraeili at the 35th Tehran International Short Film Festival (2018)

Name of the award ceremony, year presented, category, nominee of the award, and the result of the nomination
Award	Year	Category	Nominated Work	Result	Ref(s)
Fajr Film Festival	2013	Best Actress in a Supporting Role	Bending the Rules	Nominated	
Fajr Film Festival	2020	Best Actress in a Leading Role	Drowning in Holy Water	Nominated	
Hafez Awards	2020	Best Actress – Motion Picture	Boarding Pass	Nominated	
Hafez Awards	2025	Best Actress – Motion Picture	Cause of Death: Unknown	Nominated	
Iran's Film Critics and Writers Association	2025	Best Actress in a Supporting Role	World War III	Nominated	
Malaysia International Film Festival	2022	Best Actress	Drowning in Holy Water	Nominated	
Nahal International Short Film Festival	2015	Best Actress	Quadrumvirate	Won	
Nahal International Short Film Festival	2024	Best Actress	Two Lives of Sepideh	Nominated	
Queen Palm International Film Festival	2019	Best Actress	Boarding Pass	Silver Award	
Tehran International Short Film Festival	2018	Best Actress	In Between	Honorary Diploma	
Urban International Film Festival	2019	Best Actress	Boarding Pass	Nominated	
