= Walnut Tree (2020 film) =

- Film poster
- Directed by: Mohammad Hossein Mahdavian
- Screenplay by: Ebrahim Amini; Hossein Hassani
- Produced by: Seyyed Mostafa Ahmadi
- Starring: Payman Maadi; Mina Sadati; Minoo Sharifi; Mehran Modiri
- Cinematography: Hadi Behrouz
- Edited by: Mohammad Najarian
- Music by: Habib Khazaeifar (composer); Roozbeh Bemani (poet); Alireza Ghorbani (vocalist); Ardeshir Kamkar (kamancheh player)
- Distributed by: Eli Image
- Release dates: 1 February 2020 (FIFF); 1 September 2021 (Iran)
- Running time: 105 minutes
- Country: Iran
- Languages: Persian; Kurdish
- Box office: 3.59 billion toman (Iran)

Walnut Tree (Persian: درخت گردو, romanized: Derakht-e Gerdoo) is a 2020 Iranian biographical war drama film directed by Mohammad Hossein Mahdavian and written by Ebrahim Amini and Hossein Hassani. it revolves around the Chemical bombing of Sardasht of 1987. The film screened for the first time at the 38th Fajr Film Festival and received 11 nominations. Mahdavian won a Crystal Simorgh for Best Director and Maadi won the Crystal Simorgh for Best Actor for his performance.

== Plot ==
In 1980, Saddam Hussein, a former Iraqi dictator, invaded neighboring Iran to expand his territory. He thought he would soon win this war. But that did not happen. Annoyed by the prolongation of the war, he decided to end the war with chemical weapons. This the story of a people their prime life suffered the horror of being attacked by chemical bombs.

The film is based on a true story that in the summer of 1987, "Qader Molanpour" (Payman Maadi) lives happily with his pregnant wife and three children in a border village in Kurdistan until an Iraqi fighter drops his only remaining bomb on the village on his way back from the chemical bombing of Sardasht, injuring his family and villagers. Qader arrives in the village and takes his wife and children to the hospital. Qader's spouse, "Maryam" (Minoo Sharifi) is eight months pregnant and therefore not allowed to move, but her three children are being moved to other cities.

Qader tries hard to keep his three seven to eight- year-old children alive, but unfortunately lose them one by one due to the severe exposure. Qader hides their death from Maryam so that she can give birth to her child without grief. The baby is born, but Maryam dies during the delivery and Qader is now alone with a new born baby. The man could no longer endure the pain and finally explodes and screams at the doctor blaming him for his wife's death. He reproaches the doctor for not ending the pregnancy in favor of the mother's health. Qader buries Maryam beside his children beneath a walnut tree in his village. The doctor comes and reveals that Maryam herself was aware of the danger still insisted on giving birth.

The doctor also told Qader that Maryam had already been informed about the death of her children and sacrificed herself to gift her husband this baby. She had even decided on a name, "Zhina" meaning life before her death. Bursting into tears, Qader heads to the hospital to bring his wife's only gift back home but due to the improper condition of the hospital, new-born babies are transferred to other cities and Qader loses his last child in that chaos.

Years later, he is being asked to testify against the use of weapons of mass destruction of The Hague Netherlands city in Court and there he talks to her lost Zhina and wants her to hear his voice but no luck. Qader searches for Zhina everywhere until the last day of his life and finally dies in the snowy winter of 2016 without having a chance to see her.

== Cast ==
- Payman Maadi as Qader
- Mina Sadati as Homa
- Minoo Sharifi as Maryam
- Mehran Modiri as Doctor Ahmad
- Zhina Zahedi as Qader's daughter
- Mahan Karimi as Qader's son
- Mahya Karimi as Qader's son
- Amir Hossein Hashemi as Emergency driver

== Production ==
Mohammad Hossein Mahdavian:

I have always tried to make a national film, but I am accused that my films are in defense of the government. But Walnut Tree is both patriotic and a critique of governance.‌

=== Cinematography ===
For the visual space of the story, old Negative and different cameras have been used for each time period. For the 1987 scenes, a 16mm Eclair camera was used. A 35mm camera was used for the 2005 sequences and an Arri digital camera was used for the 2017 sequences.

This was the first simultaneous use of three filming formats in Iranian cinema.

== Show at festivals ==
- Asia Pacific Screen Awards 2020
- Tallinn Black Nights Film Festival 2020
- Moscow International Film Festival 2021
- Shanghai International Film Festival 2021
- Barcelona Asian Film Festival 2021
- Dhaka International Film Festival 2021

== Reception ==
=== Accolades ===
Year	Award	Category	Recipient	Result
2020	Fajr Film Festival	Best Film	Walnut Tree	Nominated
2020	Fajr Film Festival	Audience Choice of Best Film	Walnut Tree	Runner-up
2020	Fajr Film Festival	Best Director	Mohammad Hossein Mahdavian	Won
2020	Fajr Film Festival	Best Actor	Payman Maadi	Won
2020	Fajr Film Festival	Best Supporting Actress	Minoo Sharifi	Nominated
2020	Fajr Film Festival	Best Editor	Mohammad Najarian	Nominated
2020	Fajr Film Festival	Best Original Score	Habib Khazaeifar	Nominated
2020	Fajr Film Festival	Best Makeup	Shahram Khalaj	Nominated
2020	Fajr Film Festival	Production Design	Mohamadreza Shojaei	Nominated
2020	Fajr Film Festival	Costume Design	Behzad Jafari Tadi	Nominated
2020	Fajr Film Festival	Special Effects	Iman Karamian	Nominated
2020	Fajr Film Festival	Visual Effects	Amir Pahlavan zadeh & Kamyar Shafi pour	Nominated
2020	Barcelona Asian Film Festival	Best Film	Walnut Tree	Won
2020	Barcelona Asian Film Festival	Best Director	Mohammad Hossein Mahdavian	Won
2021	Hafez Awards	Best Motion Picture	Walnut Tree	Nominated
2021	Hafez Awards	Best Director – Motion Picture	Mohammad Hossein Mahdavian	Nominated
2021	Hafez Awards	Best Actor – Motion Picture	Payman Maadi	Won
2021	Hafez Awards	Best Cinematography – Motion Picture	Hadi Behrouz	Nominated
2021	Hafez Awards	Best Editor – Motion Picture	Mohammad Najarian	Nominated
2021	Hafez Awards	Best Original Score	Habib Khazaeifar	Nominated
2021	Hafez Awards	Best Original Song	''Walnut Tree'' (Alireza Ghorbani, Roozbeh Bemani, Habib Khazaeifar)	Nominated
2022	Agrandisman Awards	Best Photographer	Majid Talebi	Won
2022	Iran's Film Critics and Writers Association	Best Actor in a Leading Role	Payman Maadi	Nominated
2022	Iran's Film Critics and Writers Association	Best Technical Achievement	Makeup: Shahram Khalaj	Nominated
