= Three Women (2008 film) =

- Persian: سه زن
- Directed by: Manijeh Hekmat
- Written by: Manijeh Hekmat; Naghmeh Samini
- Produced by: Manijeh Hekmat
- Starring: Niki Karimi; Pegah Ahangarani; Nazanin Ahmadi; Mehran Rajabi; Atila Pesyani; Reza Kianian; Babak Hamidian; Setareh Pesyani; Shahrzad Kamalzadeh; Maryam Boubani; Saber Abar
- Cinematography: Dariush Ayari
- Edited by: Mostafa Kherghehpoosh
- Music by: Heidar Sajedi
- Distributed by: Bamdad Film
- Release date: 14 February 2008 (Berlin International Film Festival)
- Running time: 94 Min
- Country: Iran
- Language: Persian

Three Women (Persian: سه زن; Se Zan) is a 2008 Iranian drama film directed by Manijeh Hekmat.

== Plot ==
The film "Three Women" tells the story of a woman named Mino who is looking for her daughter.

== Cast ==
- Niki Karimi
- Pegah Ahangarani
- Nazanin Ahmadi
- Mehran Rajabi
- Atila Pesyani
- Reza Kianian
- Babak Hamidian
- Setareh Pesyani
- Shahrzad Kamalzadeh
- Maryam Boubani
- Saber Abar
- Ahmad Yavari Shad
- Mehrdad Ziaei
- Masume Eskandari
- Shiva Ebrahimi
- Khosro Ahmadi
- Ahmad Saatchian
- Satenik Babakhanian
- Shahrokh Forotanian
- Nasim Amirkhosro

== Awards ==
Year	Award	Category	Recipient	Result
2008	Amiens International Film Festival	Best Film	Manijeh Hekmat	Won
2008	Amiens International Film Festival	SIGNIS Award	Manijeh Hekmat	Won
2009	Fajr International Film Festival	Best Still Photographer	Amir Abedi	Won
