= Skin (2020 film) =

- Film poster
- Directed by: Bahman Ark; Bahram Ark
- Screenplay by: Bahman Ark; Bahram Ark
- Produced by: Mohammad Reza Mesbah
- Starring: Javad Ghamati; Fatemeh Masoudifar; Mahmoud Nazaralian; Nasser Hashemi; Hadi Eftekharzadeh
- Cinematography: Ali Abpak; Pouria Pishvaei
- Edited by: Mohammad Najarian
- Music by: Bamdad Afshar
- Release dates: February 1, 2020 (FIFF); October 14, 2021 (Iran)
- Country: Iran
- Language: Azeri

Skin (Persian: پوست, romanized: Poost) is a 2020 Iranian fantasy horror drama film directed and written by Bahman Ark and Bahram Ark. The film screened for the first time at the 38th Fajr Film Festival and received 6 nominations and 2 awards including Best Film in Art & Experience Cinema and Best Original Score.

== Plot ==
In a tale of love, magic and superstition, demonic Jinns threaten a man's mother. He must confront the sins of his family and a curse that spans generations.

== Cast ==
- Javad Ghamati as Araz
- Fatemeh Masoudifar as Maral
- Mahmoud Nazaralian
- Nasser Hashemi
- Hadi Eftekharzadeh
- Ashegh Vali Abdi
- Narges Delaram
- Ebrahim Dehghanzadeh
- Sadigheh Daryani
- Vahid Shirzad
- Davoud Noor Pour
- Davoud Mazloumi
- Amir Vala
- Samad Delnavaz
- Vahid Delnavaz

== Reception ==
=== Awards and nominations ===
Year	Award	Category	Recipient	Result
2020	Fajr Film Festival	Best Film in Art & Experience Cinema	Skin	Won
2020	Fajr Film Festival	Best Original Score	Bamdad Afshar	Won
2020	Fajr Film Festival	Best First Film	Ark Brothers	Nominated
2020	Fajr Film Festival	Best Editor	Mohammad Najarian	Nominated
2020	Fajr Film Festival	Best Sound	Sound Recording: Amir Shahroudi	Nominated
2020	Fajr Film Festival	Best Sound	Sound Editing: Alireza Alvian	Nominated
2020	Fajr Film Festival	Best Costume Design	Rasoul Alizadeh	Nominated
2020	Fajr Film Festival	Best Production Design	Pourya Akhavan	Nominated
2020	Fajr Film Festival	Best Special Effects	Arash Aghabik	Nominated
2021	Hafez Awards	Best Actress – Motion Picture	Fatemeh Masoudifar	Nominated
2021	Hafez Awards	Best Original Score	Bamdad Afshar	Won
2021	Hafez Awards	Abbas Kiarostami Memorial Medal	Skin	Won
2022	1st Iranian Cinema Directors' Great Celebration	Best New Film Director	Ark Brothers	Won
2022	Iran's Film Critics and Writers Association	Best Cinematography	Ali Abpak, Pouria Pishvai	Nominated
2022	Iran's Film Critics and Writers Association	Best Editor	Mohammad Najarian	Nominated
2022	Iran's Film Critics and Writers Association	Best Sound	Amir Shahordi, Alireza Alavian	Nominated
2022	Iran's Film Critics and Writers Association	Best Original Score	Bamdad Afshar	Nominated
2022	Iran's Film Critics and Writers Association	Best Technical Achievement	Production Design: Pouria Akhavan	Nominated
2022	Iran's Film Critics and Writers Association	Best Technical Achievement	Costume Design: Rasoul Alizadeh	Nominated
2022	Iran's Film Critics and Writers Association	Best Creativity and Talent (first filmmakers)	Bahman Ark & Bahram Ark	Nominated
