= Elham Nami =

Iranian actress (born 1986)

- الهام نامی
- Born: April 28, 1986 (age 39); Mashhad, Razavi Khorasan, Iran
- Occupation: Actress
- Years active: 2001–present

Elham Nami (Persian: الهام نامی; born April 28, 1986) is an Iranian actress. She is best known for her roles in Shahrzad (2017–2018), Jeyran (2022–2023), and Hunting Ground (2025). In 2017, Nami won the Best Actress Award in Morour section as the runner-up in 35th Fajr Theatre Festival for her performance in Parallel Strollers. She earned a Hafez Award nomination for her role in Hunting Ground.

== Early life and education ==
Elham Nami was born on April 28, 1986 in Mashhad, Razavi Khorasan, Iran. She studied Dramatic Literature at the Faculty of Fine Arts, University of Tehran (2004–2009). Nami also attended workshops including Iranian folk dance with Farzaneh Kaboli (in 2006), choreography with Rejane Douarre, and acting with Fabrice Nicot (both in 2007, Tehran–Paris program).

== Career ==
She began her career in theater as a teenager and later appeared in television, cinema, and stage productions. Nami gained recognition for her performances in the television series Shahrzad (2018) and Jeyran (2022), both directed by Hassan Fathi. Nami began acting on stage in 2001 with Wooden Horse. Notable performances include:

- Romeo and Juliet (2005), directed by Mehdi Amiri
- Oedipus on the Way (2007), directed by Fabrice Nicot, Paris
- Green, White and Star (2007), Kuala Lumpur
- Parallel Strollers (2017), directed by Payam Laryan, which earned her the Best Actress Award at the Fajr Festival.

=== Writing ===
Nami has written for stage and screen. She co-wrote the screenplay for The Season of Grapes, which won Best Screenplay at the 32nd Mediawave Festival in Hungary. Other works include the short films Outside (2008) and Repeat (2019).

== Filmography ==
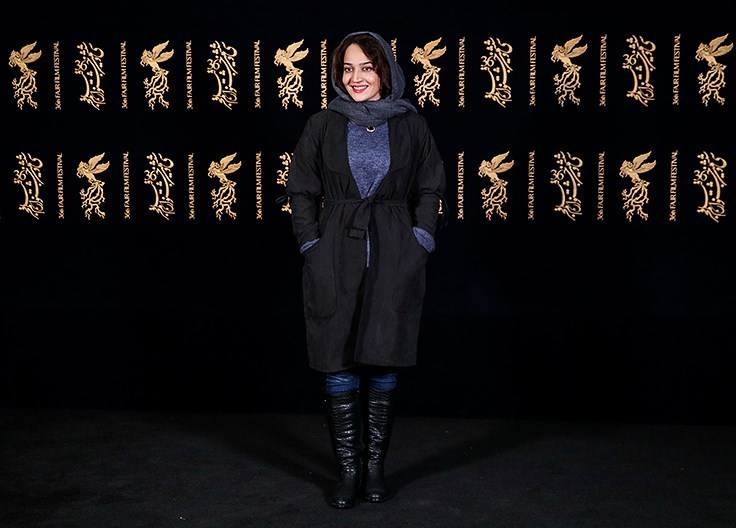
Nami at the 2018 Fajr Film Festival

=== Film ===
Year	Title	Role	Director	Notes	Ref(s)
2012	Block 9, Exit 2	Sahar's teacher	Alireza Amini		
2015	A Persian Melody	Mahlagha's Friend	Hamid Reza Ghotbi		
2015	Taboo	Marjan	Khosrow Masoumi		
2017	Unfinished Lights	Shahrbanoo	Mostafa Soltani		
2017	Kupal	News presenter (voice)	Kazem Mollaie		
2018	Dirty Job	Elham	Khosrow Masoumi		
2019	Symphony No.9	Ezzat ed-Dowleh	Mohammad Reza Honarmand		
2021	Mahrokh's House		Shahram Ebrahimi		
2021	Grape Season		Behrouz Khorram	Short film; also as co-writer	
2023	Metronome	Girl	Alireza Rajabzadeh	Short film	
2023	Refinery	Zohreh	Mehrdad Khoshbakht		
2023	Black Gem	Zohreh Keykavousi (voice)	Mohammad Ali Sajjadi	Animation	
2025	Zal and Rudaba	Rudaba (voice)	Mohammad Ali Sajjadi	Animation	

=== Web ===
Year	Title	Role	Director	Platform	Notes	Ref(s)
2017–2018	Shahrzad	Mehri	Hassan Fathi	Lotus Play	Recurring role	
2022–2023	Jeyran	Shokouh al-Saltaneh	Hassan Fathi	Filimo	Supporting role	
2025	Hunting Ground	Simin Malekzadeh	Nima Javidi	Filimo	Main role	

== Awards and nominations ==
- Best Actress Award, Parallel Strollers, 35th Fajr International Theater Festival (2017).
- Best Screenplay Award (co-writer), The Season of Grapes, 32nd Mediawave Festival, Hungary.
