= Day Zero (2020 film) =

- Film poster
- Directed by: Saeid Malekan
- Written by: Saeid Malekan; Bahram Tavakoli
- Produced by: Saeid Malekan
- Starring: Amir Jadidi; Saed Soheili
- Cinematography: Ali Ghazi
- Edited by: Maysam Molaei
- Release dates: February 1, 2020 (FIFF); March 9, 2022 (Iran)
- Running time: 110 minutes
- Country: Iran
- Languages: Persian; Urdu; Pashto; German
- Budget: 8 billion toman
- Box office: 8.89 billion toman

Day Zero (Persian: روز صفر, romanized: rooz-e sefr) is a 2020 Iranian action thriller drama film directed by Saeid Malekan and written by Bahram Tavakoli and Malekan. The film screened for the first time at the 38th Fajr Film Festival and earned 7 nominations and received 5 awards.

== Premise ==
The story is about the arresting of the famous terrorist Abdolmalek Rigi and how it was accomplished.

== Cast ==
- Amir Jadidi as Reza / Siavash
- Saed Soheili as Abdolmalek Rigi
- Tinoo Salehi as Farough
- Mohammadreza Maleki as Security Agent
- Amin Golestaneh as Bashir
- Mahdi Gorbani as Suicide Terrorist
- Abolfazl Amiri as Terrorist Sniper
- Reza Khodadbigi as Suicide Terrorist
- Sina Shafiei as Security Agent
- Abolfazl Saffary as Reporter
- Natalie Lindeman
- Hamidreza Soleymani
- Milad Yazdani
- Mohammad-Ali Rajpout
- Ebrahim Barzideh
- Mojgan Mokhber Sabet
- Navid Karimzadeh
- Ali-Asghar Sabouri Rad
- Mohammad Dagheri
- Mohammadreza Tahiri

== Reception ==
=== Accolades ===
Year	Award	Category	Recipient	Result
2020	Fajr Film Festival	Special Jury Prize	Saeid Malekan	Won
2020	Fajr Film Festival	Best Costume Design	Amir Malekpour	Won
2020	Fajr Film Festival	Best Special Effects	Mohsen Roozbahani	Won
2020	Fajr Film Festival	Best National Film	Saeid Malekan	Won
2020	Fajr Film Festival	Best First Film	Saeid Malekan	Won
2020	Fajr Film Festival	Best Film	Saeid Malekan	Nominated
2020	Fajr Film Festival	Best Director	Saeid Malekan	Nominated
2020	Fajr Film Festival	Best Screenplay	Saeid Malekan and Bahram Tavakoli	Nominated
2020	Fajr Film Festival	Best Actor	Amir Jadidi	Nominated
2020	Fajr Film Festival	Best Edit	Maysam Molaei	Nominated
2020	Fajr Film Festival	Best Production Design	Soheil Danesh Eshraghi	Nominated
2020	Fajr Film Festival	Best Visual Effects	Mohammad Ali Fathi, Mohsen Kheirabadi, Reza Misaghi	Nominated
2022	Iran's Film Critics and Writers Association	Best Editor	Meysam Molai	Won
2022	Iran's Film Critics and Writers Association	Best Technical Achievement	Best Special Effects: Mohsen Roozbahani	Nominated
2022	Iran's Film Critics and Writers Association	Best Creativity and Talent (first filmmakers)	Saeid Malekan	Nominated
