= The Rain Falls Where It Will =

- Official film poster
- Persian: ابر بارانش گرفته
- Directed by: Majid Barzegar
- Written by: Majid Barzegar; Arman Khansarian
- Produced by: Majid Barzegar, Amir Endalah
- Starring: Nazanin Ahmadi; Arshia Nikbin; Alireza Sanifar; Mazdak Mirabedini; Hamidreza Maleki
- Cinematography: Masoud Amini Tirani
- Edited by: Hamidreza Barzegar
- Production companies: Rainy Pictures, The Other End
- Release date: February 2020 (Fajr Film Festival)
- Countries: Iran, Canada
- Language: Persian

The Rain Falls Where It Will (Persian: ابر بارانش گرفته, romanized: Abr Baranash Gerefteh) is a 2020 Iranian - Canadian film directed, produced by Majid Barzegar, co-produced by Amir Endalah, co-screenplayed with Arman Khansarian. it stars Nazanin Ahmadi, Arshia Nikbin, Alireza Sanifar, Mazdak Mirabedini and Hamidreza Maleki. Nazanin Ahmadi awarded Crystal Simorgh for Best Actress at the 38th Fajr Film Festival.

== Awards ==
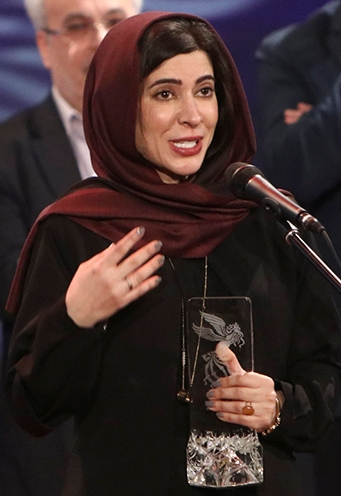
Nazanin Ahmadi awarded Crystal Simorgh for Best Actress at the 38th Fajr Film Festival

Year	Award	Category	Recipient(s)	Result	Ref.
2020	Fajr Film Festival	Best Actress	Nazanin Ahmadi	Won	
2020	Fajr Film Festival	Best Supporting Actor	Arshia Nikbin	Nominated	
2020	Fajr Film Festival	Best Cinematography	Masoud Amini Tirani	Nominated	
2022	Iran's Film Critics and Writers Association	Best Actress in a Leading Role	Nazanin Ahmadi	Nominated	
