= Fatemeh Masoudifar =

Iranian actress

- فاطمه مسعودی‌فر
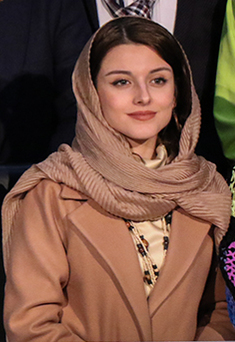
- Born: 24 February 1996 (age 30); Tabriz, Iran
- Education: University of Tabriz
- Occupation: Actress
- Years active: 2015–present
- Known for: Skin, Jeyran

Fatemeh Masoudifar (Persian:فاطمه مسعودی‌فر; born 24 February 1996) is an Iranian actress known for her work in theatre, film, and television. She rose to prominence for her performance in the fantasy horror film Skin, for which she was nominated for the Hafez Award for Best Actress. She later gained widespread acclaim for her role as Sara the Georgian in the historical series Jeyran.

== Filmography ==
Year	Title	Role	Notes
2020	Skin	Maral	Feature film debut
2022	Jeyran	Sara the Georgian	Lead role
2023	Zakhm Kari (Season 3)	Ensieh Toloui	Recurring role

== Awards and nominations ==
- Nominee – Best Actress, Hafez Awards (2021) – Skin
- Nominee – Best Actress in a TV Series, Hafez Awards (2023) – Jeyran

== Personal life ==
Masoudifar is of Azerbaijani heritage. She has one older sister, Nazy Masoudifar, and resides in Tehran.
