= Bamdad Afshar =

Iranian composer and sound designer

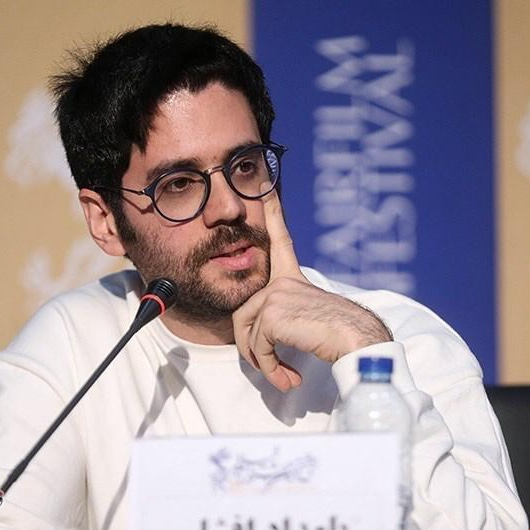
- Afshar at the 38th Fajr Film Festival in 2020
- Born: June 3, 1986 (age 40); Tehran, Iran
- Occupations: Composer, sound designer

Bamdad Afshar (Persian: بامداد افشار; born June 3, 1986) is an Iranian composer and sound designer. He has composed music and designed sound for films, television series, documentaries, and theatrical productions in Iran and internationally. He won the Crystal Simorgh for Best Original Score at the 38th Fajr Film Festival for his work on Skin.

== Early life and career ==
Afshar was born on 3 June 1986 in Tehran, Iran. He has worked primarily as a composer and sound designer for cinema and theatre, with projects presented both in Iran and internationally. He has also collaborated with Cheshmeh Publishing House's Radio Gousheh division, working as a supervisor and composer on audiobook productions.

Afshar has also worked with environmental sounds recorded in Tehran. One of his projects in this field was Seven Pieces for Tehran.

He has also been involved in projects combining robotics, sound art, and electronic music. Many of these projects have been developed under the supervision and creative direction of a group known as "Otagh".

Otagh has released several music projects and has collaborated internationally. Its projects have included music created for Japanese artist Tsuyoshi Ozawa, as well as licensing Otagh's music for a documentary produced by Vice Media. The group's music video "The Dead Are Selfish" was also presented as part of the online Mannheim Opera Festival's program.

== Filmography ==
=== Television and streaming series ===
Year	Title	Director	Role	Awards
2019	KashoKhin	Keyvan Mohseni	Composer	Best Original Music, Marseille Web Fest (2023)
2020	The Frog	Houman Seyyedi	Composer	
2021	Rebel	Mohammad Kart	Composer	
2021	Lily's Turn	Ruhollah Hejazi	Composer	
2022	Once Upon a Time in Mars	Peyman Ghasemkhani	Composer	
2022	The Lion Skin	Jamshid Mahmoudi	Composer	
2022	Release Me	Shahram Shah-Hosseini	Composer	
2022	Legitimate Revenge	Abdollah Boushehri	Composer	
2022	Weld Omma	Abdollah Boushehri	Composer	
2023	The Chamber	Fadi Wafai	Composer	
2025	Die Hard	Mostafa Taghizadeh	Composer	
2025	Beretta	Amir-Hossein Torabi	Composer	

=== Feature films ===
Year	Film	Director	Role	Awards
2026	Trees Are Watching	Bahman Ghobadi	Composer	
2023	Kianoosh's Garden	Reza Keshavarz Haddad	Composer	
2023	Ariashahr Two People	Hamid Bahramian	Composer	
2023	Parviz Khan	Ali Thaghafi	Composer	
2022	South Legacy	Hossein Domari and Pedram Pouramiri	Composer	
2022	World War III	Houman Seyyedi	Composer	
2021	Bimadar	Seyyed Morteza Fatemi	Composer	
2021	Private Meeting	Omid Shams	Composer	
2021	Without Dream	Arin Vazir-Daftari	Composer	
2020	Star Game	Hatef Alimardani	Composer	
2020	Bam Bala	Seyyed Jamal Seyyed-Hatami	Composer	
2020	Yedo	Mehdi Jafari	Composer	Nominated for Best Original Score at the 39th Fajr Film Festival
2020	Scene Breaking	Alireza Samadi	Composer	
2020	Roshan	Ruhollah Hejazi	Composer	
2020	Black Cat	Karim Amini	Composer	
2019	Skin	Ark Brothers	Composer	Crystal Simorgh for Best Original Score at the 38th Fajr Film Festival; Hafez Award for Best Original Score at the 21st Image World Festival
2019	Cinema, City of Tales	Keyvan Ali-Mohammadi and Ali Akbar Heydari	Composer	
2018	As I Lay Dying	Mostafa Sayari	Composer	
2017	Pig	Houman Seyyedi	Composer	Hafez Award for Best Music; nominated for Best Music at the Iranian Cinema Critics and Writers Association Awards
2016	Simulation	Abd Abest	Composer and sound designer	
2016	Drum	Keyvan Karimi	Composer and sound designer	
2016	Gilda	Omid Bonakdar and Keyvan Ali-Mohammadi	Composer and sound designer	
2015	Drum	Keyvan Karimi	Composer and sound designer	
2014	I'm Dangerous Mind	Houman Seyyedi	Composer	Nominated for Best Music at the 9th Iranian Cinema Critics and Writers Association Awards
2014	Arghavan	Keyvan Ali-Mohammadi and Omid Bonakdar	Sound designer	

=== Documentaries ===
Year	Film	Director	Role	Awards
2021	Bibi Jan	Iman Paknahad and Narges Joudaki	Composer and sound designer	Best Sound, 15th Cinema Vérité International Documentary Film Festival
2015	Writing on the City	Keyvan Karimi	Composer and sound designer	
2013	Abraham in the Fire	Omid Bonakdar and Keyvan Ali-Mohammadi	Composer and sound designer	
2013	Broken Border	Keyvan Karimi	Composer and sound designer	

=== Short films ===
Year	Film	Director	Role	Awards
2020	The Last Shower	Nazanin Karimi	Composer	
2020	Bichareh	Amir Ahmad Ghazvini	Composer	
2019	Koocheh	Mohammad-Reza Mesbah	Composer	
2019	Echo	Mahin Sadri	Composer	
2014	Washbasin	Jaber Ramazani	Sound designer	Best Sound, 6th Independent Iranian Short Film Festival
2013	Adventures of a Working Couple	Keyvan Karimi	Composer and sound designer	
2011	Newziv	Mohammad Esmaeili	Sound designer	Best Sound, 4th Independent Iranian Short Film Festival

=== Theatre ===
Year	Production	Role	Director	Awards
2021	Cherry Blossoms	Composer and sound designer	Mohammad Mosavat	
2020	Waiting for Godot	Composer and sound designer	Amir Reza Koohestani	
2019	Philoktet	Composer and sound designer	Amir Reza Koohestani	
2018	The Attack	Composer and sound designer	Amir Reza Koohestani	
2019	100 Percent	Composer and sound designer	Morteza Esmaeil-Kashi	Nominated for Best Music at the 36th Fajr International Theatre Festival
2018	Les Misérables	Sound designer	Hossein Parsaei, conducted by Bardia Kiaras	
2018	Mississippi Dies Sitting	Sound designer	Homayoun Ghanizadeh	
2017	City-Play	Director and composer	Bamdad Afshar	
2017	Diabolic: Romeo and Juliet	Composer and sound designer	Atila Pesyani	Nominated for Best Sound at the 35th Fajr International Theatre Festival
2017	Project C	Sound designer	Homayoun Shajarian and Sohrab Pournazeri	
2014	Slow Sound of Snow	Sound designer	Jaber Ramazani	
2014	Homoribas	Composer and sound designer	Yaser Khaseb	
2014	Mother Courage and Her Children	Composer and sound designer	Zahra Sabri	
2014	The Gardener of Death	Sound designer	Arvand Dastaray	
2013	The Return of the Prodigal Son	Sound designer	Ali Razi	
2012	Strange Creatures	Composer and sound designer	Reza Servati	Nominated for Best Music at the 29th Fajr International Theatre Festival
2012	Woyzeck	Composer and sound designer	Reza Servati	Nominated for Best Original Music at the Iranian National Critics of Theatre Awards
2012	Sklick and the Flying Children	Composer and sound designer	Mohammad Aghabati	
2012	Decision, Decision	Composer and sound designer	Mehdi Farshidi Sepehr	Best Music, 18th International Children and Young Adults Theatre Festival of Iran
2011	Me and the Jester	Composer and sound designer	Nima Dehghani	
2010	Macbeth	Composer and sound designer	Reza Servati	Nominated for Best Music at the 28th Fajr International Theatre Festival

== Discography ==
Year	Release	Artist	Role	Label	Awards
2022	Rebel Music from the Original TV Series	Bamdad Afshar	Composer	Vaak Records	
2022	Leili's Turn – Music from the Original TV Series	Bamdad Afshar	Composer	Vaak Records	
2021	Tafriq (two-volume set)	Otagh	Composer	Vaak Records	
2021	The Skin – Original Motion Picture Soundtrack	Bamdad Afshar	Composer	Vaak Records	Hafez Award for Best Original Score; Crystal Simorgh for Best Original Score at the 38th Fajr Film Festival
2021	To Dasht-e Naftoon	Otagh	Arranger and creative director	Vaak Records / Beethoven Records	
2020	Shuji Terayama	Otagh	Composer	Vaak Records	
2019	Raaz	Houshiyar Khayyam and Bamdad Afshar	Composer	30m Records	Named one of the best Iranian albums of 2020 by Beehype
2019	Balance	Otagh	Composer	Sheed Records	
2018	City-Play	Otagh	Composer	Sheed Records	Nominated for Best Music at the annual Ma Music Festival
2018	Tamaroz – Original Motion Picture Soundtrack	Bamdad Afshar	Composer	Beep Tunes	
2017	Ghamnameh-ye Fereydoun	Hossein Alizadeh and Peyman Yadgari	Sound designer	Javan	
2012	Blue, Gray, Black	Saeedeh Rahimi	Composer	Part Records	

== Awards and nominations ==
Award	Year	Work	Category	Result
Fajr Film Festival	2020	Skin	Best Original Score	Won
Hafez Awards	2019	Pig	Best Music	Won
Hafez Awards	2021	Skin	Best Original Score	Won
Fajr Film Festival	2021	Yedo	Best Original Score	Nominated
Iranian Cinema Critics and Writers Association	2015	I'm Dangerous Mind	Best Music	Nominated
Fajr International Theatre Festival	2018	Diabolic: Romeo and Juliet	Best Sound	Nominated
Independent Iranian Short Film Festival	2015	Washbasin	Best Sound	Won
Independent Iranian Short Film Festival	2011	Newziv	Best Sound	Won
