= The Beautiful City =

Beautiful City
- Directed by: Asghar Farhadi
- Written by: Asghar Farhadi
- Produced by: Iraj Taghipoor
- Starring: Taraneh Alidoosti; Faramarz Gharibian; Babak Ansari; Hossein Farzi-Zadeh; Ahu Kheradmand
- Cinematography: Ali Loghmani
- Edited by: Shahrzad Pouya
- Music by: Hamidreza Sadri
- Release date: February 1, 2004 (FIFF)
- Running time: 101 minutes
- Country: Iran
- Language: Persian

Beautiful City (Persian: شهر زیبا /Shahr-e Ziba/) is a 2004 Iranian drama film directed by Asghar Farhadi.

== Title ==
The film is named after a neighborhood in western Tehran called Shahr-e ziba in Farsi, which can be translated as “Beautiful City”. Tehran’s Center for Correction and Rehabilitation, the juvenile detention center featured in the film, is located in that district.

== Plot ==
Akbar celebrates his 18th birthday in Tehran’s Center for Correction and Rehabilitation. He has been held in the juvenile detention center for committing murder at the age of sixteen when he was condemned to death. Legally speaking, he had to reach the age of eighteen so that the conviction could be carried out. Now, Akbar is transferred to prison to await the day of his execution. A'la, a friend of Akbar, who himself has undergone imprisonment for burglary, soon after his release tries desperately to gain the consent of Akbar's plaintiff so as to stop the execution.

== Cast ==
- Taraneh Alidoosti as Firoozeh
- Faramarz Gharibian as Abolqasem Rahmati
- Babak Ansari as A'la
- Hossein Farzi-Zadeh as Akbar
- Ahu Kheradmand as Mr. Abolqasem's Wife

== Awards and nominations ==
Year	Group	Award	Recipients and nominees	Result
2004	Fajr Film Festival	Crystal Simorgh Award – Best Sound Mixing	Hassan Zahedi	Won
2004	35th International Film Festival of India	Golden Peacock (Best Film)	Asghar Farhadi	Won
2004	35th International Film Festival of India	Special Jury Award	Faramarz Gharibian	Won
2004	Warsaw International Film Festival	Grand Prix	Asghar Farhadi	Won
2005	Split Film Festival	FIPRESCI Prize	Asghar Farhadi	Won
