= World War III (2022 film) =

- Film poster
- Directed by: Houman Seyyedi
- Written by: Houman Seyyedi; Arian Vazirdaftari; Azad Jafarian
- Produced by: Houman Seyyedi
- Starring: Mohsen Tanabandeh; Mahsa Hejazi; Navid Nosrati; Neda Jebraeili
- Cinematography: Peyman Shadmanfar
- Edited by: Houman Seyyedi
- Music by: Bamdad Afshar
- Production company: Namava
- Distributed by: Iranian Independents; Shayesteh Film
- Release dates: September 7, 2022 (Venice); October 6, 2022 (Iran)
- Running time: 107 minutes
- Country: Iran
- Language: Persian

World War III (Persian: جنگ جهانی سوم, romanized: Jang-e jahāni-e sevvom) is a 2022 Iranian thriller drama film co-written, directed, produced and edited by Houman Seyyedi. The film stars Mohsen Tanabandeh, Mahsa Hejazi, Neda Jebraeili and Navid Nosrati. It was selected as the Iran entry for Best International Feature Film at the 95th Academy Awards.

World War III competed for the Orizzonti Award at the 79th Venice International Film Festival where it won the Orizzonti Award for Best Actor and the Orizzonti Award for Best Film.

== Premise ==
Shakib (Mohsen Tanabandeh) is a homeless day laborer who lost his wife and son in an earthquake years ago. Over the past couple of years, he has been in a relationship with Ladan (Mahsa Hejazi), a deaf and mute woman. The construction site on which he works turns out to be the set of a film about the Holocaust.

Against all odds, he is given a house and the opportunity of a lifetime to play the role of Adolf Hitler. When Ladan learns about his movie role and the house, she comes to his workplace to ask for help and a place. Shakib's plan to hide her fails and threatens to destroy his chance to be somebody.

== Cast ==
- Mohsen Tanabandeh as Shakib
- Mahsa Hejazi as Ladan
- Navid Nosrati as Saeed Nosrati
- Neda Jebraeili as Neda Zareh
- Morteza Khanjani as Farshid
- Lotfollah Seyfi
- Hatem Mashmouli

== Production ==
=== Pre-production ===
On May 11, 2021, Seyyedi announced that he would not appear in Saeed Aghakhani and Ehsan Zalipour's series The Secret of Survival (2022) because he was involved in the production of his new film. On July 4, it was announced that the title of Seyyedi's new film would be World War III, and that its pre-production had been under way for a few days. Also, Mohsen Tanabandeh was introduced as the first actor of the film and some of the film's crew were named, and it was announced that the filming of World War III would begin in September. The rest of the actors of the project were also announced in the next news. It was also announced that Namava Internet Broadcasting Service would invest in the project.

On September 4, it was announced that Seyyedi has obtained the license for the World War III project, and filming would begin soon.

=== Filming ===
On October 27, 2021, the actors, writers and crew of the film were introduced and it was announced that the filming had started and was under way in the north of Iran. Some of the film crew had already collaborated with Seyyedi in the films Sheeple (2019) and Confessions of My Dangerous Mind (2015).

== Release ==
World War III was made with investment from Namava, and it was the first time that the online streaming platform had entered into the production of a movie project. It was also the second collaboration between Seyyedi and Namava after the series The Frog (2020–2021).

On August 4, 2022, it was announced that the film was set to compete for the Orizzonti Award at the 79th Venice International Film Festival.

== Reception ==
=== Critical response ===
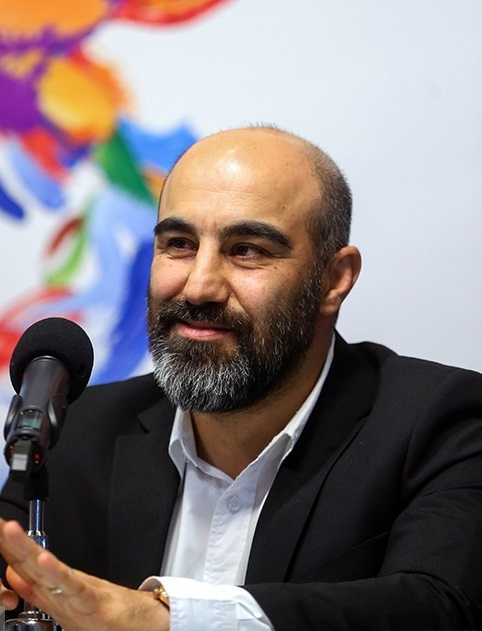
Mohsen Tanabandeh's performance as Shakib garnered widespread critical acclaim and earned him the Orizzonti Award for Best Actor.

With the urgency of a good thriller and the clarity of a fable, World War III is the gruelling but compelling tale of how one of life’s victims learns to imitate his oppressors. Largely unspooling on the set of a bad film being made about the Holocaust, Iranian Houman Seyedi’s sixth feature starts out as jet-black comedy before darkening still further into tragedy, a journey embodied in an absorbing and extraordinary central performance by Mohsen Tanabandeh as the film’s downtrodden hero.

— Screen Daily / Jonathan Holland

Technically speaking, Director of Photography Payman Shadmanfar delivers striking imagery, creating a visually pleasing contrast between the brightness of the red house (one of the film’s main locations), the chiaroscuros of the poorly lit environments and the paler colours of the surrounding forest. [...] Seyedi demonstrates his expert knowledge of the directing craft and the actor’s work through an elegant mise-en-scene and excellent character development.

— The New Arab / Davide Abbatescianni

=== Accolades ===
Award	Date of ceremony	Category	Recipient(s)	Result	Ref(s)
Asian Film Awards	2023	Best Actor	Mohsen Tanabandeh	Nominated	
Asian World Film Festival	2022	Best Actor	Mohsen Tanabandeh	Won	
Asian World Film Festival	2022	Special Jury Award	Houman Seyyedi	Won	
Hainan International Film Festival	2022	Golden Coconut	Houman Seyyedi	Nominated	
Luxembourg City Film Festival	2023	Grand Prix	Houman Seyyedi	Nominated	
Middle East Now	2022	Best Film	Houman Seyyedi	Special Mention	
Palm Springs International Film Festival	2023	FIPRESCI Prize	Houman Seyyedi	Nominated	
Stockholm International Film Festival	2022	FIPRESCI Prize	Houman Seyyedi	Won	
Tokyo International Film Festival	October 24 – November 2, 2022	Best Film	Houman Seyyedi	Nominated	
Tokyo International Film Festival	October 24 – November 2, 2022	Special Jury Prize	Houman Seyyedi	Won	
Venice International Film Festival	August 31 – September 10, 2022	Orizzonti Award for Best Film	Houman Seyyedi	Won	
Venice International Film Festival	August 31 – September 10, 2022	Orizzonti Award for Best Actor	Mohsen Tanabandeh	Won	

== See also ==
- List of submissions to the 95th Academy Awards for Best International Feature Film
- List of Iranian submissions for the Academy Award for Best International Feature Film
