= Rainy Seasons (film) =

2010 film directed by Majid Barzegar

- Film poster
- Persian: فصل باران‌های موسمی
- Directed by: Majid Barzegar
- Written by: Majid Barzegar, Hamed Rajabi
- Produced by: Manoochehr Shahsavari
- Starring: Navid Layeghi Moghadam, Marzieh Khoshtarash, Elnaz Habibi
- Cinematography: Amin Jafari
- Distributed by: Honar va Tajrobe
- Release date: January 2010 (FIFF)
- Running time: 86 minutes
- Country: Iran
- Language: Persian

Rainy Seasons (Persian: فصل باران‌های موسمی, romanized: Fasl-e Bārān-hā-ye Mowsemi) is a 2010 Iranian film, directed by Majid Barzegar. Barzegar's directorial debut, it tells the story of sixteen-year-old Sina (Navid Layeghi Moghadam), who is left with an apartment to himself as his parents divorce. He finds himself in a difficult situation, hounded by neighborhood tough Masoud (Alireza Bagheri) to whom he owes money, as he allows Nahid (Marzieh Khoshtarash) to stay with him temporarily. The movie was originally conceived as a short film before being developed into a full-length feature.

== Cast ==
- Navid Layeghi Moghadam as Sina
- Marzieh Khoshtarash as Nahid
- Alireza Bagheri as Masoud
- Mehran Khodaei as Ali
- Elnaz Habibi as Ali's sister

== Reception ==
Writing for SBS Movies, Don Groves panned the film, noting "deficiencies in the screenplay" such as the "insipid, sullen protagonist plus a meandering, listless narrative and a disappointing lack of tension or engagement with the characters." The film nevertheless won the Best Director award at the 2010 Dushanbe Film Festival.
