= Bending the Rules =

- Film poster
- Directed by: Behnam Behzadi
- Written by: Behnam Behzadi
- Produced by: Behnam Behzadi
- Starring: Neda Jebraeili; Amir Jafari; Elahe Hesari; Ashkan Khatibi; Mehrdad Sedighian; Mohammad Reza Ghaffari; Baharan BaniAhmadi; Martin Shamoonpour; Roshanak Gerami
- Cinematography: Amin Jafari
- Edited by: Behnam Behzadi
- Music by: Martin Shamoonpour
- Release dates: February 1, 2013 (FIFF); March 16, 2013 (Iran)
- Running time: 94 minutes
- Country: Iran
- Language: Persian

Bending the Rules (Persian: قاعده تصادف, romanized: Ghaedeye tasadof, meaning The Rule of Accident) is a 2013 Iranian drama film directed, written and produced by Behnam Behzadi. The film screened for the first time at the 31st Fajr International Film Festival and received 3 Awards and 3 nominations.

== Cast ==
- Neda Jebraeili as Shahrzad
- Amir Jafari as Shahrzad's Father
- Ashkan Khatibi as Amir
- Mehrdad Sedighian as Bardia
- Baharan Bani Ahmadi as Parisa
- Mohammad Reza Ghaffari as Mehrdad
- Elahe Hesari as Ladan
- Martin Shamoonpour as Martin
- Roshanak Gerami as Maryam
- Soroush Sehhat as Shahrzad's Uncle
- Omid Roohani as Parisa's Father
- Soroosh Malamir as Asad
- Ehsan Mahsouri

== Reception ==
=== Accolades ===
| Year | Award | Category | Recipient | Result |
|---|---|---|---|---|
| 2013 | Fajr Film Festival | Best Director | Behnam Behzadi | Nominated |
| 2013 | Fajr Film Festival | Best Screenplay | Behnam Behzadi | Won |
| 2013 | Fajr Film Festival | Best Sound Recording | Yadollah Najafi | Won |
| 2013 | Fajr Film Festival | Best Supporting Actress | Neda Jebraeili | Nominated |
| 2013 | Fajr Film Festival | Best Actor | Amir Jafari | Nominated |
| 2013 | Fajr International Film Festival | Audience Choice of Best Film | Behnam Behzadi | Nominated |
| 2013 | Fajr International Film Festival | Best Film | Behnam Behzadi | Won |
| 2013 | International Filmfestival Mannheim-Heidelberg | Special Award of the International Jury | Behnam Behzadi | Won |
| 2013 | Three Continents Festival | Audience Award | Behnam Behzadi | Won |
| 2013 | Three Continents Festival | Golden Montgolfiere | Behnam Behzadi | Nominated |
| 2013 | Tokyo International Film Festival | Special Jury Prize | Behnam Behzadi | Won |
| 2013 | Tokyo International Film Festival | Tokyo Grand Prix | Behnam Behzadi | Nominated |
