= Taboo (2015 film) =

- تابو
- Directed by: Khosro Masoumi
- Written by: Khosro Masoumi
- Produced by: Javad Norozbeigi
- Starring: Elnaz Shakerdoost; Mohammad Hadi Dibaji; Elham Nami; Mehran Rajabi; Jamal Ejlali; Roshanak Gerami; Hossein Abedini; Jamshid Jahanzadeh
- Cinematography: Nader Masoumi
- Edited by: Hassan Hassandoost
- Music by: Hossein Alizadeh
- Distributed by: Honar Tajrobeh
- Release date: 31 August 2015; Montreal World Film Festival
- Running time: 108 minutes
- Country: Iran
- Language: Persian

Taboo (Persian: تابو) is a 2015 Iranian Drama film written and directed by Khosro Masoumi.

== Plot ==
Taboo is the story of a 67-year-old Iranian landowner named Salar (Jamal Ejlali) in the north of Iran. In spite of having 3 legal wives, he is pushing one of his workers - who has a beautiful 24-year-old daughter (Elnaz Shakerdoost), to force his daughter into marrying him. The girl is a nurse and is in love with a local teacher named Kasra (Mohammad Hadi Dibaji). She elopes with him and they decide to get married but...

== Cast ==
- Elnaz Shakerdoost
- Mohammad Hadi Dibaji
- Elham Nami
- Mehran Rajabi
- Jamal Ejlali
- Roshanak Gerami
- Hossein Abedini
- Jamshid Jahanzadeh
- Khayam Vaghar Kashani
- Nouraldin Aalami
- Bijan Afshar
- Mitra Tabrizi
- Oliver Raymond Maule

== Awards and nominations ==
Year	Award	Category	Recipient	Result
2015	Montreal World Film Festival	Grand Prix des Amériques	Khosro Masoumi	Nominated
