= Marché du Film =

French film market held with the Cannes Film Festival

- Formation: 1959
- Type: Film market
- Location: Cannes, France
- Parent organization: Festival de Cannes
- Website: marchedufilm.com

The Marché du Film (transl. Film market), also called Cannes Film Market, is an annual marketplace for films and one of the world's largest film markets. Established in 1959, it is held annually in conjunction with the Cannes Film Festival.

In the 2020s, more than 12,500 film industry professionals annually present around 4,000 films and projects at Marché du Film, generating multi-million dollar deals estimated to be between US$600 million and $1 billion. Its main purpose is to bring together the different players from the audiovisual industry to make connections and discuss business opportunities such as collaborations and co-productions, financing, and distribution.

== History ==
=== 20th century ===
Before the Marché du Film was created, film production companies rented the Antibes cinema rooms to show their films, while producers and professionals discussed business in hotels and apartments they had rented during the Cannes Film Festival. As early as in 1950, Robert Favre Le Bret, Executive Director of the Festival de Cannes, suggested including a film market in the Festival de Cannes, but his idea was rejected because the festival committee stressed out artistic significance and values of the Cannes festival and didn’t want to clutter it with commerce. For a whole decade, le Festival de la rue d'Antibes ran in parallel with the Cannes Film Festival, sometimes coinciding with important events. Seeing the success of the film market, the Cannes Film Festival Committee finally agreed to include it in its programme. In 1959, by two members of the Chambre Syndicale des Producteurs de Film Français (lit. "Trade Union Chamber of French Film Producers"), Émile Natan and Bertrand Bagge, with the patronage of André Malraux and Robert Le Bret, the Marché du Film was officially established.

In 1980, L'Association du Festival ("the festival association") decided to establish the Secrétariat Général du Marché du Film ("General Secretariat of the film market"), with Michel Bonnet and Marcel Lathière in charge. They started to slowly set up the Marché du Film by introducing fares for films subscriptions and booth rentals. Up until the mid-1990s, however, most of the deals and meetings took place in the hotels and rented apartments where festival guests stayed. Marché du Film was shown in the basement of the Palais des Festivals et des Congrès. In 1994, when Tarantino's Pulp Fiction grossed over $200 million at the worldwide box office, a sum never before seen in Independent Film, the business community saw a monetary opportunity in independent cinema. In 1995, Marché du Film was headed by Jérôme Paillard, a former professional oboist, sound engineer, and finance director of the Erato Disques label. It was his initiative to move the events of the Film Market to the pavilions on La Croisette and to extend the range of films on show beyond those on the main programme at Cannes. It was also Payard's idea to publish a guide to the film market with photos of all the participants (this guide has been nicknamed "the bible" by Marché du Film regulars). The number of market participants in 1995 was over two thousand.

In 1998, they launched Cannesmarket.com, a B2B-platform for members of the film industry, which by 2003 had grown into Cinando. By 2000, the number of participants had doubled, and by 2005 there were more than 8,000.

=== 21st century ===
==== 2010s ====
In 2012, more than half of the screenings were in European countries, with a total of 4,000 films sold at the Marché du Film that year, half of which were fully completed.

Modern Marché du Film is a flagship event for the global film industry, with a multi-million pound budget and no fewer than 12,000 participants, 3,200 producers, 1,200 agents and 800 festival managers. Over 400 pavilions, collectively known as the International Village, stretch along La Croisette, and some are also spread across new locations on the Riviera. It includes the largest database with industry contact details, project lists and event schedules. Although generally there is no public disclosure of sums and a significant number of agreements take place behind the scenes, Jérôme Payard estimates the total volume of deals made during the film market to be in the range of US$600 million to US$1 billion.

In 2016, 11,900 participants registered for the film market, with China almost catching up with the US and France and the UK in terms of the percentage of attendees. A total of 1,426 screenings of 985 feature films took place and 1,050 additional projects were presented. One of the biggest deals of the year was STX Entertainment's purchase of Martin Scorsese's The Irishman for $50 million. A total of 3,420 films were marketed, with 1,600 European and 830 American. Participants noted an increasing trend in the number of deals for films that are at a very early stage of completion: projects with a finished script, an approved director and actors and little footage are being sold. In addition, the market segment formerly occupied by DVD and pay-TV has virtually disappeared.

==== 2020s ====
Due to the quarantine imposed as a result of the COVID-19 pandemic, Marché du Film 2020 ran online via a video-on-demand platform partnership between Cinando and Shift72. More than 150 events were held, with 250 participants presenting their virtual stands.

In 2021, one of the biggest deals was STX's $75m purchase of global distribution rights to Gerard Butler's Greenland sequel.

In 2022, Jérôme Paillard introduced his successor as director of the Marché du Film, Guillaume Esmiol, former head of innovation at TF1 Group and marketing director at start-up Wefound. Paillard and Esmiol co-directed the Marché du Film 2022; in December of the same year Paillard retired. Also in 2022, "Ukraine in Focus" program was launched, while key initiatives like Goes to Cannes, Cannes Docs Showcase, and Producers Network were dedicated to Ukrainian projects. The Marché du Film had a strong focus on Indian cinema. The total number of participants in 2022 was 12,000, with another 13 joining the event online, but in general there has been a decline in comparison to the pre-COVID days.

Guillaume Esmiol became the new director of the Film Market in 2023, with Jérôme Paillard stepping down after 27 years in charge. A new motto was created for the event: "the heart of the film industry". The beach at Palace of Festivals and Congresses became a plaza dedicated to new film trends: VR, streaming, and machine learning. On the ground floor of the palace, a Producers' Club was opened. The 2023 film market attracted an even greater number of participants, with at least 13,000 coming to Cannes. The biggest deal announced was Netflix's purchase of North American distribution rights to Todd Haynes' drama May December.

== Industry programs ==
A number of programs are provided during the Marché du Film for the benefit of producers, directors, festival programmers, sales agents, and other film industry professionals:

Cannes XR

Cannes XR is a program dedicated to immersive technologies and entertainment.

Cannes Docs

Cannes Docs is dedicated to documentaries. It is also a B2B platform designed to connect professionals to other documentary professionals, promote festival, company or organization, expand network and develop projects.

Cannes Next

Cannes Next is dedicated to innovative technologies in moviemaking.

Animation Day

The Marché du Film has partnered with the Annecy Festival for Animation Day: a program, dedicated to animated films.

Goes to Cannes

Goes to Cannes spotlights work-in-progress projects looking for sales agents, distributors or festival selection.

Frontières

Organised by the Fantasia International Film Festival in partnership with the Marché du Film – Festival de Cannes, Frontières is an international co-production market and networking platform specifically focused on genre film financing and co-production between Europe and North America.

Producers Network

Launched 15 years ago, the Producers Network hosts producers from all around the world for a series of meetings and unique events specifically designed to create opportunities to build peer networks and get international co-production projects off the ground.

impACT

impACT is a joint initiative of Microsoft and the Marché du Film, launched to promote ethics, inclusion, representation and social responsibility in cinema industry.
