= Exodus (2020 film) =

2020 Iranian film by Ebrahim Hatamikia

- Official poster
- Directed by: Ebrahim Hatamikia
- Written by: Ebrahim Hatamikia
- Screenplay by: Ebrahim Hatamikia
- Produced by: Habibollah Vaalinejad
- Starring: Faramarz Gharibian; Pantea Panahiha; Mohammad-Reza Sharifinia; Kambiz Dirbaz; Jahangir Almasi; Atash Taqipour
- Cinematography: Vahid Ebrahimi
- Edited by: Emad Khodabakhsh
- Music by: Karen Homayounfar
- Production company: Owj Arts and Media Organization
- Distributed by: Filmiran
- Release dates: 1 February 2020 (Fajr); 12 April 2020 (Iran)
- Running time: 124 minutes
- Country: Iran
- Language: Persian
- Budget: c. Rls.90 billion
- Box office: c. Rls.30 billion

Exodus (Persian: خروج, romanized: Ḵorouj) is a 2020 Iranian drama film written and directed by Ebrahim Hatamikia. Exodus narrates the story of Rahmat Bakhshi, an Iran–Iraq War veteran and his fellow hard-working cotton farmers that lose all their crops after their farms are inadvertently inundated with salt water from a local dam. In response, they drive their tractors to the Presidential Administration in protest.

Exodus screened for the first time at the 38th Fajr Film Festival, and has created controversy. The film opened on 12 April 2020.

== Plot ==
The film tells the story of a group of rural farmers who, while emptying a saltwater dam, accidentally release water onto their farmland, ruining all their crops. After failing to resolve their problem through the dam officials, the village headman, the district headman, and the Imam of Friday Prayer, they decide to go to the president and share their problem with him. The group sets off from their village to Tehran by tractor, and it doesn't take long for the news of their trip to be broadcast in all the media, which creates popularity and problems for them.

== Cast ==
- Faramarz Gharibian as Rahmat
- Pantea Panahiha as Mehr Banoo
- Sam Gharibian as Rahman
- Kambiz Dirbaz as Security Agent
- Mehdi Faghih as Molla Agha
- Reza Noori as Police

== Production ==
Ebrahim Hatamikia after making of The Report of a Party (2011), had had an idea to make a film about people's protest against the rulers but did not decide on an appropriate story until January 2019. In late 2018, he heard about a real protest which occurred in a small town. Hatamikia liked the story, so began screenwriting for Exodus in early 2019. Shooting began in a village of Gachsaran County and ended at Qom.

== Music ==
Music of Exodus composed by Karen Homayounfar. Homayounfar formerly had collaborated with Hatamikia in The Green Ring (2007–2008), The Report of a Party (2011), Bodyguard (2016) and Damascus Time (2018).

== Release ==
Exodus was scheduled to be screened from March 2020 onwards, but this was changed due to the outbreak of the COVID-19 pandemic, and the film was instead released online. It is the first feature film in Iran which has had its public premiere on a video on demand distribution system. Furthermore, it has been named as the first film in the Islamic Republic of Iran to be screened at a drive-in theater.

== Reception ==
=== Critical response ===
According to media reports, Hatamikia's technical ambitions after Che (2014), Bodyguard (2016) and Damascus Time (2018) continues here. Tehran Times newspaper described Exodus as a road movie, reminding the audience of the Classical Western films. It also describes wide shots of the cotton and corn farms, and close-ups of the main character with his believable makeup as "eye-catching". Faramarz Gharibian portrays Rahmat gracefully, making the audience believe the character's miserable life, which fuels his deep anger, is only visible in his eyes. According to a review, everything appears to be fine with the film, but the problem starts when Hatamikia tries to turn the film into a tribune for expressing his political views; it seems that the film is criticising the current Iranian government. Kayhan newspaper noted that the movie has a "reasonable, calm and firm" protest, contrasting against the Joker's "revolt theory".

Parviz Jahed, a notable Iranian critic, wrote that Exodus has signs of road movies such as The Straight Story (David Lynch, 1999) and The Sugarland Express (Steven Spielberg, 1974), Western movies such as Unforgiven (Clint Eastwood, 1992) and Peasant movies such as Viva Zapata! (Elia Kazan, 1952) and The Grapes of Wrath (John Ford, 1940) but that it does not belong to a particular genre; what comes to mind is a similarity to former Soviet Union patriotic and Socialist realism movies.

=== Controversy ===
Iranian Moderates accused Hatamikia of trying to please the country's hard-liners, pointing out that the film was financed by Owj Arts and Media Organization, which is tied to the Islamic Revolutionary Guard Corps. During a press conference, Hatamikia denied that he has ever made films on request, or ever will. The film was lambasted by Reformists immediately, who described it as a propaganda film commissioned by the radicals to undermine Hassan Rouhani. The government-run Iran newspaper described the film as "superficial" and "laughable". Reformist Entekhab news site said Hatamikia's talents as a filmmaker were diminishing, and the only way he could get funding was by directly hitting the President.

== Awards ==
| Award | Date of ceremony | Section | Category | Recipient(s) | Result | Ref. |
|---|---|---|---|---|---|---|
| Fajr Film Festival | 11 February 2020 | Simorgh Competition | Best Actor | Faramarz Gharibian | Nominated | |
| Fajr Film Festival | 11 February 2020 | Simorgh Competition | Best Sound (Sound Recording and Sound Mixing) | Amir Nobakht, Arash Ghasemi | Nominated | |
| Fajr Film Festival | 11 February 2020 | Simorgh Competition | Best Costume Design | Maral Jeyrani | Nominated | |
| Fajr Film Festival | 11 February 2020 | Simorgh Competition | Best Makeup | Mehrdad Mirkiani | Won | |
| Fajr Film Festival | 11 February 2020 | Simorgh Competition | Best Visual Effects | Mohammad Baradaran | Won | |
| Hafez Awards | 15 August 2020 | Cinema | Best Actor | Faramarz Gharibian | Nominated | |
