= Drowning in Holy Water =

- Film poster
- Directed by: Navid Mahmoudi
- Written by: Navid Mahmoudi
- Produced by: Jamshid Mahmoudi
- Starring: Matin Heydarinia; Ali Shadman; Neda Jebraeili; Sadaf Asgari; Sogol Khaligh
- Cinematography: Morteza Ghafori
- Edited by: Nima Jafari Jozani
- Music by: Sahand Mehdizadeh
- Production companies: Aseman Parvaz Film; Farabi Cinema Foundation
- Distributed by: persiafilmdistribution
- Release dates: February 1, 2020 (FIFF); December 24, 2020 (Iran)
- Countries: Iran; Afghanistan
- Language: Persian

Drowning in Holy Water (Persian: مردن در آب مطهر, romanized: Mordan dar abe motahhar) is a 2020 Iranian drama film directed and written by Navid Mahmoudi and produced by his brother Jamshid Mahmoudi. The film screened for the first time at the 38th Fajr Film Festival and received 2 nominations.

== Cast ==
- Matin Heydarinia as Hamed
- Ali Shadman as Sohrab
- Neda Jebraeili as Setareh
- Sadaf Asgari as Rona
- Alireza Ara as Nader
- Sogol Khaligh as Afghan immigrant girl
- Amirreza Ranjbaran as Afghan immigrant boy
- Mahtab Jafari as Afghan immigrant girl
- Khayam Vaghar as Rona's brother
- Peiman Moghadami as Human trafficker
- Farid Eshaqi as Police
- Fatemeh Shokri as Miss Lili
- Alireza Mehran as Ghaffar
- Keyvn Beygi as Amir
- Mohammad Ali Entezarian as Costumer
- Fatemeh Mirzaei
- Mahya Rezayi

== Reception ==
=== Accolades ===
Year	Award	Category	Recipient	Result
2021	Asian Film Festival Barcelona	Panorama Section Award (Best Film)	Navid Mahmoudi	Nominated
2020	Busan International Film Festival	Kim Ji Seok Award	Navid Mahmoudi	Won
2020	Fajr Film Festival	Best Actor	Ali Shadman	Nominated
2020	Fajr Film Festival	Best Actress	Neda Jebraeili	Nominated
2022	Malaysia International Film Festival	Best Film	Jamshid Mahmoudi	Won
2022	Malaysia International Film Festival	Best Actress	Neda Jebraeili	Nominated
2022	Malaysia International Film Festival	Best Supporting Actor	Matin Heydarinia	Nominated
2022	Malaysia International Film Festival	New Hope Award	Navid Mahmoudi	Nominated
