= Jeyran (TV series) =

Iranian historical drama series

- Persian: جیران
- Genre: Drama; History; Romance
- Written by: Ehsan Javanmard; Hassan Fathi
- Directed by: Hassan Fathi
- Starring: Parinaz Izadyar; Bahram Radan; Amirhossein Fathi; Mahdi Pakdel; Setareh Pesyani; Ghazal Shakeri; Fatemeh Masoudifar; Rana Azadivar; Amir Jafari; Elham Nami; Roya Teymourian; Hooman Barghnavard; Merila Zarei
- Country of origin: Iran
- Original language: Persian
- No. of seasons: 1
- No. of episodes: 52

Production
- Producer: Esmaeil Afifeh
- Production location: Tehran
- Running time: 45–60 minutes
- Production company: HA international

Original release
- Network: Filimo
- Release: 13 February 2022

Jeyran (Persian: جیران, romanized: Jeyrān) is a 2022 Iranian historical romance television series directed by Hassan Fathi, written by Ehsan Javanmard and Fathi and produced by Esmaeil Afifeh. The series was originally released on Filimo. Starring Parinaz Izadyar and Bahram Radan, Jeyran tells the love story of Naser al-Din Shah Qajar.

== Storyline ==
The series is a historical romantic drama capturing 6 years of the life of Naser al-Din Shah and his favorite mistress, Jeyran. The story takes place in Iran, 19th century, after the death of Amirkabir

== Cast ==
- Parinaz Izadyar as Jeyran
- Bahram Radan as Naser al-Din Shah
- Amirhossein Fathi as Siavash Panjsangi
- Mahdi Pakdel as Salman
- Setareh Pesyani as Noghreh
- Ghazal Shakeri as Malekzadeh
- Samira Hassanpour as Galin Khanum
- Mehdi Koushki as Elias
- Morteza Esmail Kashi as Khajeh Roshan
- Fatemeh Masoudifar as Sara the Georgian (Sara-ye Gorji)
- Elham Nami as Shkoh al-Sultaneh
- Nahal Dashti as Setare Khanom
- Kataneh Afshar Nejad as Khadijeh Chahrighi
- Behnaz Nazi as Naneh Ashob
- Amir Jafari as Mirza Aqa Khan Nuri
- Roya Teymourian as Kefayat Khatun
- Hooman Barghnavard as Shazde Basir
- Rana Azadivar as Taj al-Dawlah
- Merila Zarei as Mahd-e Olia
- Gholamreza Nikkhah as Aziz Agha
- Mohammad Shiri as Khajehbashi
- Siavash Cheraghipour as Kuchul Khan
- Hamidreza Naimi as Mohammad Ali Khan Tajrishi
- Sina Razani as Asadollah
- Amir Karbalayizadeh as Farzi Fozul
- Behnam Sharafi as Mirza Kazem Nezam ol-Molk
- Reza Jahani as Ali Khan Hajeb ol-Dowleh
- Nasrin Nakisa as Jeyran's mother
- Pasha Jamali as Shemshad
- Ashkan Hoorsan as Bahador
- Setayesh Dehghan as Golnesa
- Hassan Moazzeni as Khajeh Golshan
- Mohammad-Hadi Ghomshi Bozorg as astrologer
- Behzad Davari as Aziz Khan Mokri
- Vahid Razzaghi Moghadam as Rahmat
- Parviz Bozorgi as Koohsar village head
- Navid Goodarzi as Soleiman's viceroy
- Farshid Samadipour as Mahmoud Khan
- Roham Tadrisi as Esfandyar
- Ali Ashmand as Khajeh Ghanbar
- Mohammad Ali Mojdehi as Khajeh Eghbal
- Mohsen Naghibian as tavern keeper
- Kambiz Amini as Khajeh Mobarak
- Rastin Azizpour as Abbas Mirza Molkara
- Ilia Nasrollahi as Samuel
- Abbas Tofighi as Khajeh Dolat
- Atefeh Gholampour as Parvin
- Hooshang Ghanavatizadeh as chairman of foreign affairs
- Shahnoosh Shahbazzadeh as village head's wife
- Arash Kalhor as Malekzadeh's khajeh

== Soundtracks ==
=== Jeyran OST ===
Track listing
No.	Title	Artists	Length
1.	"Dar In Shabe Siah"	Homayoun Shajarian	3:28
2.	"Gerye Kon"	Homayoun Shajarian	3:03
3.	"Modara"	Homayoun Shajarian	3:45

== See also ==
- Qajar dynasty
- Qajar Iran
