= Minoo Sharifi =

Iranian actress (born 1987)

- مینو شریفی
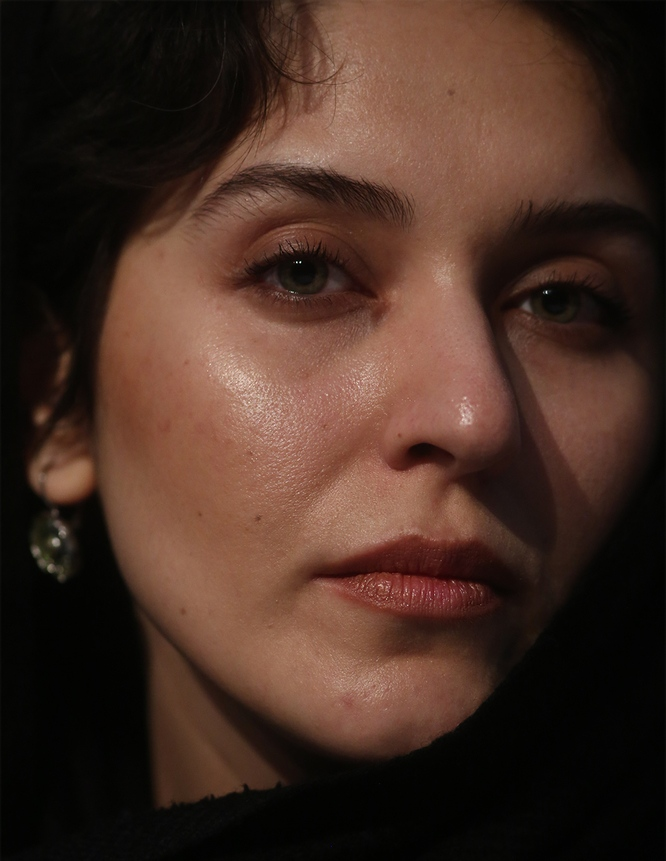
- Sharifi at the 2020 Fajr Film Festival
- Born: December 12, 1987 (age 38); Sanandaj, Kurdistan, Iran
- Education: Civil Engineering (M.E.)
- Occupation: Actress
- Years active: 2015–present

Minoo Sharifi (Persian: مینو شریفی; born December 12, 1987) is an Iranian actress. She is best known for her performances in the war drama film Walnut Tree (2020), and the romance drama web series Lunar Eclipse (2021–2022). Sharifi earned a Crystal Simorgh nomination for her acting in Walnut Tree.

== Early life ==
Sharifi is of Kurdish origin.

== Career ==
Sharifi entered the field of acting with the short film Pale Mirrors in 2015 and won the Jury Prize of the Koomesh Regional Festival and was nominated for Best Actress at the 33rd Tehran International Short Film Festival Awards.

In 2020, She got her first main role in Walnut Tree directed by Mohammad Hossein Mahdavian. she received a nomination for a Crystal Simorgh for Best Supporting Actress at the 38th Fajr Film Festival for her role.

== Filmography ==
=== Film ===
Year	Title	Role	Director	Notes	Ref(s)
2015	Pale Mirrors	Shubu	Salem Salavati	Short Film	
2019	At Dawn	Shilan	Salem Salavati		
2020	Walnut Tree	Maryam	Mohammad Hossein Mahdavian	the seventh highest-grossing film of 2021 in Iran	
2023	Endless Borders		Abbas Amini		

=== Web ===
Year	Title	Role	Director	Platform	Notes	Ref(s)
2021–2022	Lunar Eclipse	Atieh	Maziar Miri	Namava	Main role	
2025	Beretta		Amir Hossein Torabi	FILMNET	Main role	

== Awards and nominations ==
Award	Year	Category	Nominated Work	Result	Ref.
Duhok International Film Festival	2019	Best Actress of a Kurdish Feature Film	At Dawn	Won	
Fajr Film Festival	2020	Best Actress in a Supporting Role	Walnut Tree	Nominated	
Koomesh Regional Festival	2016	Jury Prize	Pale Mirrors	Won	
Tehran International Short Film Festival Awards	2016	Best Actress	Pale Mirrors	Nominated	
