= Saeed Zamanian (director) =

- سعید زمانیان
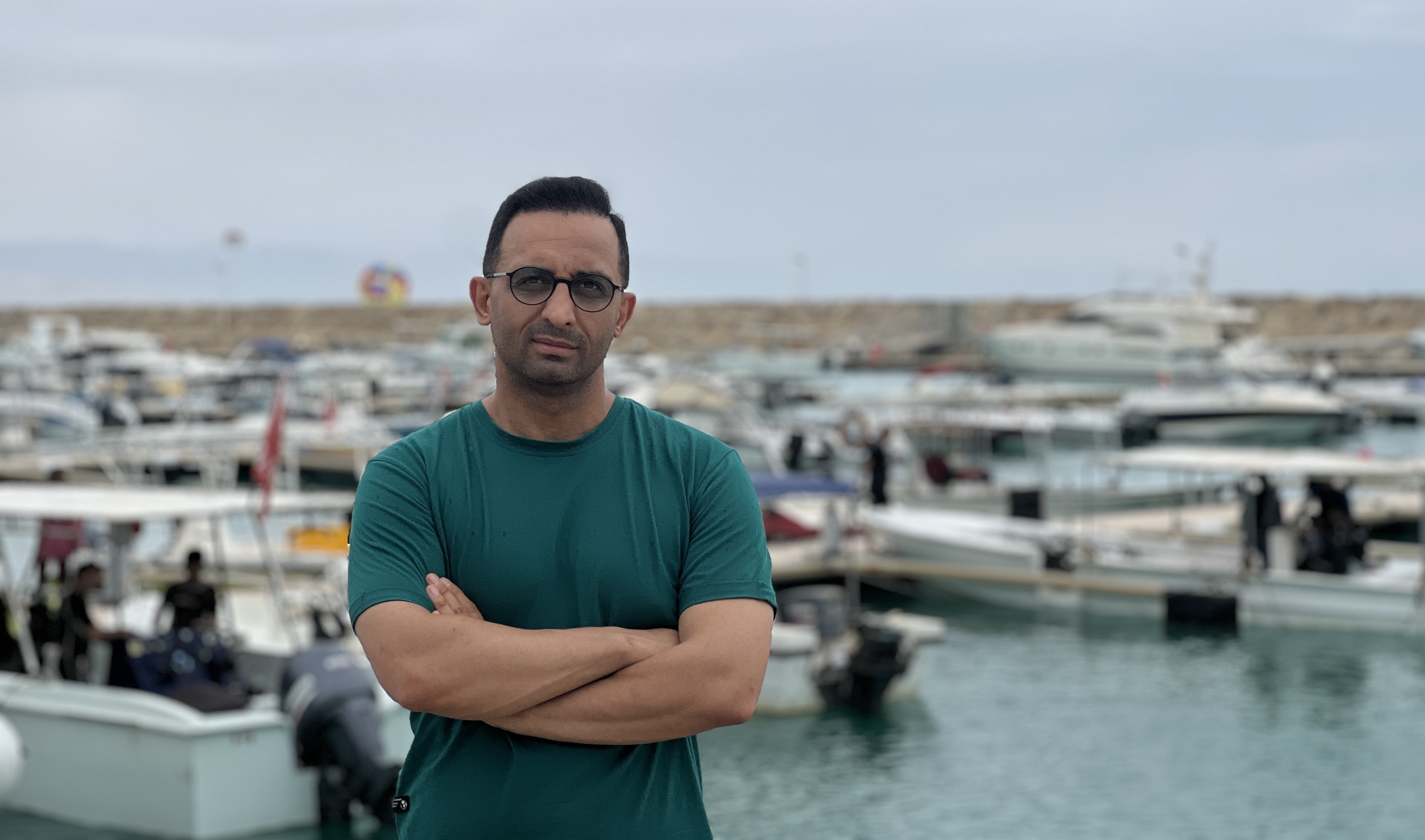
- Saeed Zamanian in 2024
- Born: 21 March 1985; Tehran, Iran
- Education: College of Fine Arts (University of Tehran)
- Occupations: Filmmaker, screenwriter
- Years active: 2003

Saeed Zamanian (Persian: سعید زمانیان; 21 March 1985) is an Iranian filmmaker, screenwriter. In February 2026, Zamanian withdrew from the Fajr International Film Festival in solidarity with the Iranian people and in respect for those killed during the January protests, a decision reported by the Financial Times and Radio Free Europe/Radio Liberty.

Saeed Zamanian holds a master's degree in directing from the College of Fine Arts (University of Tehran) and graduated from the Iranian Youth Cinema Society.

He began his career as a writer and director in 2003 with theater. The short film The Feast of the Goat (2019) is one of his most successful short films internationally. Also, the film Single Mum, starring Elnaz Shakerdoost, Hassan Pourshirazi, Saber Abar and Behnaz Jafari, is Saeed Zamanian's first feature film.

== Withdrawal from Fajr Film Festival ==
In 2026, Zamanian announced the withdrawal of his feature film Single Mum (Aram Bakhsh) from the competition section of the 44th Fajr Film Festival. The film had been selected for the festival's main competition section (Soda-ye Simorgh). Zamanian stated that he was withdrawing from the festival in respect for those who had lost their lives during the recent protests in Iran. The withdrawal was reported as the first announced withdrawal by a director of a film selected for that year's Fajr Film Festival. The film's first assistant director, Javad Ganji, was among those killed during the protests.

== Filmography ==
Year	Title	Role	Type
2017	Whale Hunter	Director	Short film
2019	The Feast of the Goat	Writer and director	Short film
2022	Adjustment	Executive producer	Short film
2023	Like A Secret	Writer and director	Short film
2026	Single Mum	Writer and director	Feature film

== Awards ==
=== Awards and appearances of the short film Like A Secret ===
- Nominated for the Best Short Screenplay award at the 37th Flickers' Rhode Island International Film Festival (Oscar Qualifier)
- Finalist at the 10th Oaxaca Film Festival in Mexico
- Best Short Screenplay award at the Florence Film Awards in Italy
- Attended the 43rd Fajr Film Festival
- Attended the Post Chester Festival in the United States
- Nominated for the Best Drama Short Film at the 30th Portobello Festival in London in the United * Kingdom
- Received the Best Film award at the 12th Pink City International Film Festival in India

=== Awards and appearances at domestic and international festivals Short film The Feast of the Goat ===
- Winner of the Best Short Screenplay award at the Independent Shorts Awards in the United States
- Winner of the Best Short Screenplay award at the Independent Talents International Film Festival in the United States
- Winner of the Best Short Screenplay award at the Rome Independent Prisma Awards in Italy
- Attended the final and nominated for the Best Short Screenplay award at the Changing Face International Film Festival in Australia
- Attended the semi-final of the Indie Festival Visions Film Festival in the United States
- Participation in the VI International Film Festival Golden Frame in the Ukraine
- Participation in the 18th Almeria International Film Festival in Spain
- Participation in the 17th Dhaka International Film Festival and received an honorary diploma for the best semantic short film
- Participation in the 18th Manchester International Kino Film Festival in the United Kingdom
- Participation in the 10th Cinema House Independent Short Film Festival and was nominated for three awards
- Participation in the 36th Tehran International Short Film Festival
- Participation in the 49th Roshd International Film Festival
- Participation in the 21st Landshot Festival in Germany
- Participation in the 40th Taos Short Film Festival in the United States
- Winner of the Best Short Screenplay Award from the Queen Palm Festival in the United States
- Participation in the 36th Fajr Film Festival
- Participation in the final of the 10th Paris Film Festival in France
- Participation in the MEME PAS PEUR International Film Festival in France
- Participation in the Yala Film Festival in Nepal
- Receiving the Best Children's Short Film Award from the Film Festival San Francisco in the United States

=== Awards and appearances of Short film The Whale Hunter ===
- Participation in The Unprecedented Cinema Festival in Estonia
- Participation in A. Rebel Minded Festival in the United States
- Participation in the IndependentShortSaward Festival in the United States
- Participation in the 59th Kashan Regional Film Festival and nominated for two screenwriting awards and the Grand Prize
- Participation in the Image of the Year Festival in Tehran
- Participation in the 7th Hasanat Isfahan Short Film Festival
- Participation in the Tallinn Black Festival in Estonia
