= Faramarz Gharibian =

Iranian actor and film director

- فرامرز قریبیان
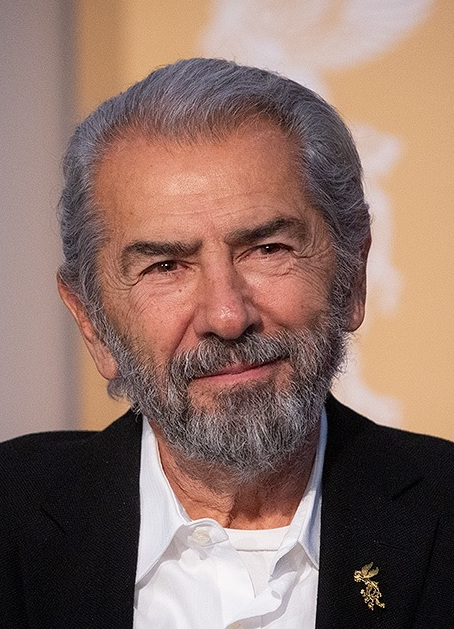
- Gharibian in 2020
- Born: 18 November 1941 (age 84); Tehran, Iran
- Occupations: Actor, film director
- Years active: 1969–2020
- Spouse(s): Mina Khayyami (divorced); Mahshid Bazargani
- Children: 2

Faramarz Gharibian (Persian: فرامرز قریبیان; born 18 November 1941) is a retired Iranian actor and film director. He won three Crystal Simorgh Awards for his performances in The Train (1988), Misty Harbour (1992), and The Rain Man (1998).

== Career ==
He learned film acting in the School of Visual Arts, US (1971). He started his career with a short role in Come Stranger (1968, Masoud Kimiai). His professional debut was in Soil (1973, Masoud Kimiai).

In most of his films, he plays the role of a resolute man who, in order to achieve his goals or preserve his ideals, must face conflict and danger. He has some adventure films in his career and also directed three feature films, Duel in Tasuki (1986), Law (1995) and Her Eyes (1999). Gharibian has been nominated for the prize of Best Actor, and has won the prize for Train (1987), Misty Harbor (1992) and The Rain Man (1999) from Fajr International Film Festival.

In recent years, he has won international awards from around the world. He won the award for Best Actor at the 25th Moscow International Film Festival and Asia Pacific Film Festival for Dancing in the Dust, he also won the Special Jury Prize in the International Film Festival of India for The Beautiful City.

== Filmography ==
- The Deers, 1974
- Ghazal, 1975
- Jong-e Athar, 1977
- The Tall Shadows of the Wind, 1977
- The Messenger, 1981
- Kani-Manga, 1986
- The Train, 1987
- The Wolf’s Trail, 1991
- Misty Harbour, 1992
- I Want to Live, 1994
- The Rain Man, 1998
- Dancing in the Dust, 2002
- Beautiful City, 2005
- The Wet Dream, 2005
- The Forbidden Chapter, 2006
- The Boss, 2007
- Alzheimer (2011)
- Exodus (2020)
