= Elnaz Habibi =

Iranian actress

- الناز حبیبی
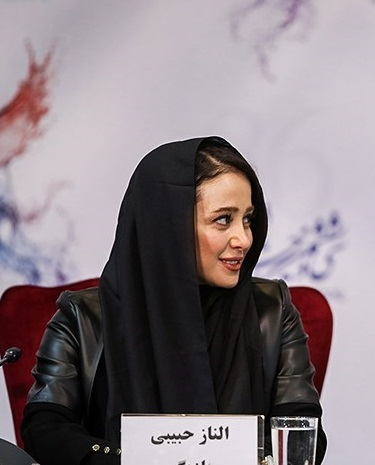
- Habibi in 2018
- Born: August 12, 1988 (age 38); Tehran, Iran
- Education: Bachelor of Editing
- Occupation: Actress
- Years active: 2007–present

Elnaz Habibi (Persian: الناز حبیبی; born August 12, 1988) is an Iranian actress. She has a degree in film editing.

== Early life ==
Elnaz Habibi was born on 12 August 1988 in Tehran, Iran and is the youngest of six siblings. Her mother died before Habibi enrolled in university, which led to a four-year hiatus from both her studies and professional work. She is a graduate of film editing. Her family resides in Sweden, but in 2014, Habibi stated that she had never traveled to Sweden.

Habibi began her acting career at the age of 11, when she was selected to perform in the film Daftarcheh Khaterat (Notebook of Memories), directed by Saeid Soltani, through the Center for the Intellectual Development of Children and Young Adults while she was in the fifth grade. She has noted that she entered the acting profession with her father's approval.

== Protest Against Mandatory Hijab ==
Elnaz Habibi was banned from appearing on Islamic Republic of Iran Broadcasting (IRIB) programs in October 2021 (Mehr 1400) after posting images without the mandatory hijab on Instagram. Prior to the official announcement of the ban, Habibi appeared as a guest on IRIB's television program *Pishgoo*, but her image was completely censored, and only her voice was broadcast. This action aligns with IRIB's strict policies on enforcing mandatory hijab laws and imposing cultural restrictions on artists.

The ban was imposed after Habibi, alongside other Iranian female artists, protested mandatory hijab laws by sharing images without a headscarf on social media. This act was part of a broader wave of protests against mandatory hijab regulations, which gained significant momentum following the "Woman, Life, Freedom" movement in 2022. Through her actions, Habibi expressed support for the movement, becoming a notable figure in these protests.

== Filmography ==
=== Cinema ===
Year	Title	Role	Director	Notes
2024	Bat		Hamid Nematollah	
2023	Red Glasses	Pari	Hossein Mahkam	
2023	Knight	Golizar	Hossein Namazi	
2023	Alligator Blood	Khater	Javad Ezzati	
2020	Fossil	Farangis	Karim Amini	
2019	Emad and Touba's Romanticism	Touba	Kaveh Sabbaghzadeh	
2019	Peytook		Seyed Majid Salehi	
2018	Tornado	Shimba	Seyed Javad Hashemi	
2018	Pig Gene		Saeed Soheili	
2017	Don't Be Shy	Tina	Reza Maghsoudi	
2017	Woman's Enemy	Roshanak	Karim Amini	
2016	Spare	Nana	Borzoo Niknejad	
2016	Lunar Eclipse		Masoud Atyabi	
2015	Reserve	Mint	Borzoo Niknejad	
2014	Gift		Amir Ahmad Ansari	
2013	Unwanted	Nabat	Borzoo Niknejad	
2010	Mixed Pizza	Elahe	Hossein Ghasemi Jami	
2009	Season of Monsoon Rains		Majid Barzegar	
2007	Bad Friend		Abbas Ahmadi Motlagh	

=== Television ===
Year	Title	Role	Director	Notes
2020	Khandevaneh	Guest	Rambod Javan	Season 7
2019	Doping	Shiva	Reza Maghsoudi	
2018	Deldar	Shadi Javanmardi	Jamshid Mahmoudi, Navid Mahmoudi	
2017	Soul Thief	Maryam	Ahmad Moazzami	
2017	Dorehami	Guest	Mehran Modiri	Season 3
2016	Nurses	Samira Norouzi	Alireza Afkhami	
2015	Massive Troubles 2	Bahar	Borzoo Niknejad	
2014	On the Right Path	Reyhaneh	Saeed Soltani	
2014	Massive Troubles 1	Bahar	Borzoo Niknejad	
2013	Chimney 1	Aliyeh	Mohammad Hossein Latifi	
2013	For Mona		Morteza Koushai	
2011	Oblivion		Saeed Soltani	
2011	Edge of Fire		Javad Afshar	
2011	Until Thurya	Elnaz	Siroos Moghadam	
2011	Five Kilometers to Heaven		Alireza Afkhami	
2010	The Thirtieth Day		Javad Afshar	
2010	Distances	Saba	Hossein Soheilizadeh	
2007	Gharib's Era	Zahra	Kianoush Ayari	
2007	Guesthouse in the Snow		Saeed Soltani	Telefilm

=== Web ===
Year	Title	Role	Director	Notes
2024	Die Hard	Negar	Mostafa Taghizadeh	
2023	Lost Dignity	Tahminah	Sajjad Pahlavanzadeh	
2022	Black Hole	Khorshid	Hossein Namazi	
2022	Once Upon a Time on Mars	Mara	Peyman Ghasemkhani, Mohsen Chegini	
2022	Sunday Dinner		Mohammad Ghanbari	Tele-theater, streamed online
2021	Ordinary People	Romina	Rambod Javan	
2021	Fortune Teller	Guest	Amin Entezari, Reza Baharvand	
2018	Hashtag Aunt Cockroach		Mohammad Moslemi	

=== Theatre ===
Year	Title	Director
2024	Pearl Island	Atila Pesyani, Setareh Pesyani
2022	The Other Side of the Mirror	Ali Sarabi
2019	King Fish	Reza Baharvand
2018	Snake Venom	Ali Ahmadi
2018	Lari Rooster	Omid Sohrabi
2017	Illegitimate Cells	Nima Yousefi
2016	Play That Song Again, Sam	Davood Bani Ardalan
2015	I Am Not There	Afshin Akhlaghi
