= MedFilm Festival =

Film festival

The MedFilm Festival is a film festival created in 1995 in Rome. It is focused on giving voice and visibility to independent movies. It is also the only Italian film festival specialized on Euro-Mediterranean movie productions, aiming to encourage mutual knowledge and inter-cultural dialogue between the two shores of the Mediterranean.

It has a prestigious reputation and it has been awarded a special prize by the President of the Republic.

== See also ==
- Cultural geography
- Geopolitics
