= Cinando =

Online film industry database

- Website type: Film database, professional network service, streaming service
- Available in: English, Spanish, Simplified Chinese
- Country of origin: France
- Owner: Marché du Film
- Key people: Jérôme Paillard (executive director)
- Website: cinando.com
- Commercial: Yes
- Registration: Required
- Users: 78,000 (as of 2018)
- Launched: 2003; 23 years ago
- Current status: Active

Cinando is an online database of film projects and professional networking and streaming service for film industry personnel and companies run by the Marché du Film of the Cannes Film Festival. Attendees of the Marché and some other film markets are granted one-year access to the service.

== History ==
Cinando was launched by the Marché du Film in 2003 as cannesmarket.com, based on the Marché's Guide, a directory of attendees created in 1996. It was renamed Cinando in 2007.

Since 2012, Cinando runs a business-to-business video-on-demand service. During the COVID-19 pandemic, the streaming service was utilized to hold screenings in a virtual version of the Cannes Marché in 2020.

Since 2017, Cinando allows its users to upload, search for, and buy subtitles for films with no additional fee.
