= Majid Barzegar =

Iranian film director

Majid Barzegar مجید برزگر
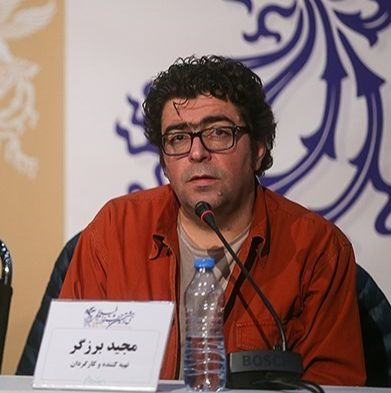
- Barzegar in 2020
- Born: March 6, 1973 (age 53); Hamedan, Iran
- Education: Tehran University of Art; Soore University
- Occupations: Film Director, Producer, screenwriter, photographer
- Website: Personal website

Majid Barzegar (Persian: مجید برزگر; born March 6, 1973, in Hamedan) is an Iranian film director, producer, screenwriter, and photographer. He established his own film company Rainy pictures in 2005 with the aim of stimulating the independent film production in Iran.

== Biography ==
Since 1990, the critically acclaimed Iranian filmmaker and producer, Majid Barzegar has been involved in the production of many independent short and feature films. Most of these films have been showcased at various international film festivals including Berlinale, San Sebastian Film Festival, Rotterdam Film Festival, São Paulo Film Festival and Thessaloniki Film Festival, besides many others.

A Minor Leap Down, produced by Barzegar, has been recently won the reputable FIPRESCI's prize in the Panorama section of Berlinale 2015. Parviz, co-produced and directed by Barzegar himself, has won numerous awards including the Jury's Special Mention Award (Competitive Section-New Directors) of the 2012 San Sebastian International Film Festival and the NETPAC Award at the 2012 Asiatica Film Mediale, Rome, Italy. His 2010 film Rainy Seasons also won the Jury's Special Mention Award at the 34th São Paulo International Film Festival in Brazil and was nominated for the Tiger Awards at the 2011 Rotterdam International Film Festival.

Barzegar has also been the president of the board of the Iranian Short Film Association (ISFA) since 2008.

As a producer, Barzegar founded his Tehran-based company rainypictures in 1998 with the aim of developing and producing independent, original films that stand out amid the humdrum of Iranian mainstream cinema.

== Filmography ==
Year	Film	Credited as			Notes
Year	Film	Director	Producer	Writer	Notes
2010	Bubble	No	Yes	No	Directed by: Saman Estaraki
2010	Rainy Seasons	Yes	Yes	Yes	Co-written with Hamed Rajabi, Co-produced with Manouchehr Shahsavari
2012	Parviz	Yes	No	Yes	Co-produced with Saeed Armand, Co-written with Hamed Rajabi, Bardia Yadegari
2015	A Minor Leap Down	No	Yes	No	Directed by: Hamed Rajabi
2015	Immortal	No	Yes	No	Directed by:Seyed Hadi Mohaghegh/ Co-produced with Reza Mohaghegh
2015	A Very Ordinary Citizen	Yes	No	Yes	Produced by: Saeed Armand with financial support of the Hubert Bals Fund, Rotterdam International Film Festival
2015	Valderrama	No	Yes	No	Directed by:Abbas Amini
2016	the Pot and the Oak	No	Yes	No	Directed by:Kiarash Anvari
2019	Leakage	No	Yes	No	Directed by:Suzan Iravanian
2020	Enemies	No	Yes	No	Directed by:Ali Derakhshandeh
2020	The Rain Falls Where it Will	Yes	Yes	Yes	Directed by:Majid Barzegar
2020	Wolf Cubs of Apple Valley	No	Yes	No	Directed by:Fereydoun Najafi
2021	MAMAN	No	Yes	No	Directed by:Arash Aneessee
