= Behnam Behzadi =

Iranian director and screenwriter

- بهنام بهزادی
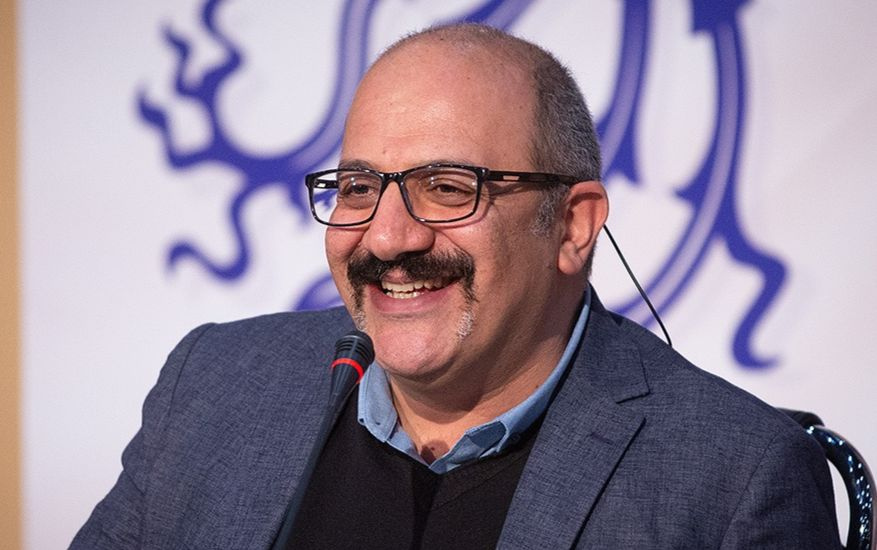
- Behzadi - January 2020
- Born: July 24, 1972 (age 53); Borujen, Iran
- Occupations: Director, Screenwriter, Editor and Producer, Founder of Maajara Film School
- Website: https://maajara.com/

Behnam Behzadi (Persian: بهنام بهزادی, Behˈnām Behzādī, born July 24, 1972) is an Iranian director, screenwriter, editor and producer.

He’s one of the internationally acclaimed Iranian directors and his films have received multiple awards from national and international film festivals. His latest feature film Inversion appeared in the Un Certain Regard section of Cannes Film Festival official selection. This film also received the Best Picture award at Med Film Festival in Italy and the Best Picture and Best Screenplay awards at Jaipur International Film Festival in India. He has also won the Best Director award for We Only Live Twice (Before The Burial) from Granada film festival in Spain and received the Special Jury Prize for Bending The Rules at Mannheim-Heidelberg International Film Festival in Germany and Tokyo International Film Festival. He has also received the Audience Choice Award at Three Continents Festival and Fajr International Film Festival for the same film. Some of his other awards include Crystal Simorgh for Best Director and Crystal Simorgh for Best Film at the international section and Crystal Simorgh for Best Screenplay at the national section of the 31st Fajr International Film Festival.

Moreover, he is the founder of Maajara Film School, an online educational start-up aiming to utilize the most innovative educational methods available to help foster interest in filmmaking and provide professional training in a wide range of cinematic fields.

== Life and career ==
Behnam Behzadi Borujeni was born on July 24, 1972, in Borujen. He started his artistic activities as a teenager with theater and photography. Afterward, he took an interest in filmmaking and made his first short film Super 8 at the age of 16. He earned his Bachelor's degree in filmmaking at Iran Broadcasting University and then started making films professionally.

Behzadi has made over 20 short films, documentaries and television films, and 4 feature films. He has several essays and writings published in journals. He has also served as a member of the juries committee for various national and international festivals including Gothenburg Film Festival in Sweden. He has been teaching filmmaking to the students of Master’s degree in Tehran University of Art, Faculty of Cinema and Theater, and Soore University in Tehran since 2015.

== Filmography ==
=== Feature films ===
Year	Title	Director	Writer	Producer	Duration	Notes and Awards
2008	We Only Live Twice (Before The Burial)	Yes	Yes	Yes	104 min	Golden Hugo nomination for Best Picture at the 2008 Chicago Film Festival Nominated for Best Screenplay at the 2008 Asia-Pacific Film Festival, Winner of Al-Hamra award for Best Director at the 2009 Granada Film Festival in Spain, Nominated for Best Film at Mexico City International Contemporary Film Festival, Nominated for Best Actor at the 2008 Asia-Pacific Film Festival, Winner of the NETPAC award for Best Asian Film in 2009, Spain, Winner of the Best Actor and Best Actress awards at the 2009 Cinefan Festival in India, Winner of Best Screenplay award at the Writers and Critics Association of Iranian Cinema in 2008.
2013	Bending The Rules	Yes	Yes	Yes	92 min	Winner of Crystal Simorgh for Best Director at the international section of the 2012 Fajr International Film Festival, Winner of Crystal Simorgh for Best Film at the international section of the 2012 Fajr International Film Festival, Winner of Crystal Simorgh for Audience Choice of Best Film at the international section of the 2012 Fajr International Film Festival, Winner of Crystal Simorgh for Best Director at the international section of the 2012 Fajr International Film Festival, Winner of the Special Jury Prize at the 2013 Tokyo International Film Festival, Nominated for Best Film award at the 2013 Sao Paulo International Film Festival in Brazil, Winner of the Special Jury Prize at the 2013 Mannheim-Heidelberg Film Festival in Germany, Winner of Best Film Selected by the Audience at the 2013 Three Continents Festival in Nates, France, Nominated for the Best Film award at the 2015 Jaipur International Film Festival in India.
2016	Inversion	Yes	Yes	Yes	85 min	Nominated at the Un Certain Regard section of the 2016 Cannes Film Festival, Winner of the Best Picture award at the 2016 Med Film Festival in Rome, Italy, Nominated for the Best Film award at the 2016 Gijón International Film Festival in Spain, Nominated for Best Director award at the 2017 Belgrade Film Festival in Serbia, Winner of the Best Picture award at the 2017 Jaipur International Film Festival in India, Winner of the Best Original Screenplay award at the 2017 Jaipur International Film Festival, Winner of the Best Film award at the Iranian Film Festival of Zurich 20.
2018	I'm Scared	Yes	Yes	Yes		

=== Short films ===
- Grandfather, 8 mm, 1988
- To Live, Film Video, 1992
- Today is Monday? 16 mm, 1993
- Day 1, Film Video, 1996
- Revenge, 16mm, 1999
- Father’s Stories (10 short films collection), Film Video, 2000
- We Went to the Riverside, Film Video, 2001

==== Awards ====
Revenge: Winner of Isfahan’s International Film Festival for Children and Youth in 2010, Winner of the FIPA Award for Best Short Film in France, 2000 - We Went to the Riverside: Winner of Golden Kite Award for Best Picture at the 2005 Buenos Aires Film Festival in Argentina - Hide Your Words: Nominated for the Best Short Documentary Award at IDFA in Amsterdam, Netherlands, 2002 - Winner of the 2003 Silver Docs Special Jury Award in the U.S.

=== Documentary films ===
- 1989, Ashura, 8 mm
- 1994, College, 16 mm
- 1996, Hand and Straw, Film Video
- 1997, Tile’s Blue Resonance, 16 mm
- 2002, Hide Your Words, Film Video
- 2003, Swan Songs (3 films collection), Film Video

=== Television films ===
- Address (2001)
- The Glass Grudge (2009)
- The Second Heart (2010)
- Someone Else (2011)
