= Urban International Film Festival =

Annual film festival held in Tehran, Iran

- Location: Tehran, Iran
- Started: 2010
- Founded by: tasvireshahr
- Most recent: 2022
- Website: shahrfilmfest.com

The Urban (Shahr) International Film Festival held annually in Tehran, Iran by Tasvir Shahr Institute, is supervised by the Tehran Municipality's cultural and artistic organization. the eighth Urban International Film Festival was held from 18 to 22 July 2022 so far.

== Official program sections ==
- Iranian Cinema Competition
- International Cinema Competition
- Neighborhood Competition
- Iranian Cinema Advertising Competition
- Side Section
- Television Series Competition
- Home Video Series Competition
- Direct-to-video Competition
- Short Film Competition
- Documentary Competition
- Animation Competition

== Awards ==
=== Iranian Cinema Competition ===
Year	Best Film	Best Director	Best Screenplay	Best Actor	Best Actress	Best Technical Award	Best Urban Film	Special Jury Prize
2015	Manouchehr Mohammadi – Kissing the Moon-Like Face	Parviz Shahbazi – Trapped	Mostafa Kiaee – Special Line	Amir Aghaee – Wednesday, May 9 Hamid Reza Azarang – Block 9 Exit 2	Mahtab Keramati – Ice Age Ahoo Kheradmand – We Have a Guest Sahar Ahmadpour –Wednesday, May 9	Mehdi Jafari – Ice Age	Ali Jalilvand – Wednesday, May 9	Vahid Jalilvand – Wednesday, May 9
2017	Saeed Malekan – Life and a Day	Mohammad Hossein Mahdavian – Midday Adventures	Kambuzia Partovi – Ferrari	Nasser Hashemi – My Brother Khosrow	Pardis Ahmadieh – Red Nail Polish	Mehrdad Mirkiani, Abdollah Eskandari – Lantouri	Bahman Kamyar, Mohsen Gharaee – Blockage Monir Gheidi – Villa Dwellers (Honorary Diploma)	Ehsan Biglari – My Brother Khosrow
2019	Saeed Sa'adi – Sheeple	Houman Seyyedi – Sheeple	Houman Seyydi – Sheeple	Navid Mohammadzadeh – Sheeple	Zhaleh Sameti – Bearer	Peyman Shadmanfar – Sheeple Nasser Fasihi – Istanbul Junction (Honorary Diploma)	Mostafa Kiaee – Istanbul Junction	–
2022	Amir Banan – Sun Children, Conjugal Visit	Hadi Hejazifar – The Situation of Mehdi	Mohammad Kart, Hossein Doomari, Pedram Pouramiri – Drown	Javad Ezzati – The Loser Man	Setareh Pesyani – Yadoo	Hooman Behmanesh – Sun Children	Mahmoud Babaee – No Prior Appointment	Majid Majidi – Sun Children
