= Saed Soheili =

Iranian actor (born 1988)

- ساعد سهیلی
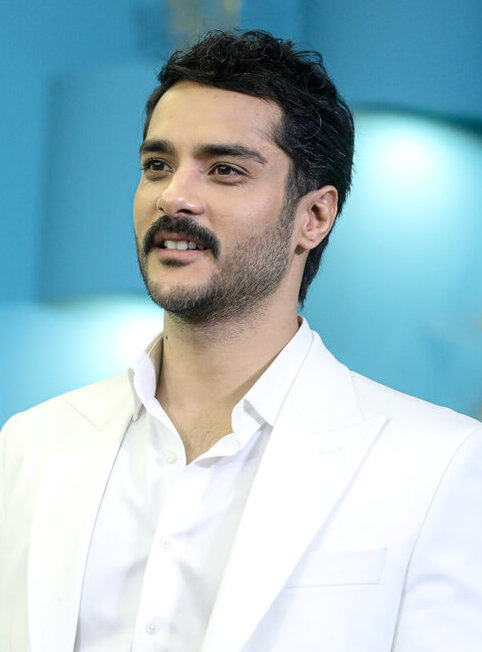
- Soheili at the 2025 Fajr Film Festival
- Born: December 19, 1988 (age 37); Mashhad, Razavi Khorasan, Iran
- Education: Azad University
- Occupation: Actor
- Years active: 2001–present
- Spouse: Gloria Hardy
- Children: 2
- Relatives: Sina Mehrad (brother)

Saed Soheili (Persian: ساعد سهیلی; born February 19, 1988) is an Iranian actor. He is best known for his roles in Guidance Patrol (2012), A Few Cubic Meters of Love (2014), Crazy Rook (2014), Bridge of Sleep (2016), Lottery (2018), and Day Zero (2020).

== Early life ==
Soheili was born in Mashhad, the son of Iranian director Saeed Soheili. His brother Sina, and his two sisters, Sara and Saba, are active in the field of cinema, television and theater. Soheili began his work at age 14 with a short role in Shab-e Brehne, directed by his father. He was also behind the scenes in some of his father's work. He has a bachelor of graphic art from the Islamic Azad University.

His first professional role was in a play for a television film by Javad Ezzati.

Soheili is married to Gloria Hardy, an Iranian-French actress born to an Iranian mother and French father who appeared in the Kimia series.

Saed Soheili was refused entry by the UAE government following the release of Lottery at the 36th Fajr Film Festival.

== Filmography ==
=== Film ===
Year	Title	Role	Director	Notes	Ref(s)
2001	Naked Night	Poryia	Saeed Soheili		
2010	A Fair Betrayal	Sahar's Brother	Amirathar Soheili		
2012	Guidance Patrol	Hassan	Saeed Soheili		
2013	Bardou	Hamid	Hadi Mohaghegh		
2013	Paat	Addicted boy	Amir Toudeh Roosta		
2014	Metropole	Khosro	Masoud Kimiai		
2014	A Few Cubic Meters of Love	Saber	Jamshid Mahmoudi		
2014	Kalashnikov	Adel	Saeed Soheili		
2014	Crazy Rook	Masoud	Abolhassan Davoudi		
2015	Fifty Kilos of Cherries	Davood	Mani Haghighi		
2016	Bridge of Sleep	Shahab	Oktay Baraheni		
2016	Malaria	Morteza	Parviz Shahbazi		
2017	Guidance Patrol 2	Hassan	Saeed Soheili		
2018	Mahoora	Amin	Hamid Zargarnezhad		
2018	The Dark Room	Farhad	Rouhollah Hejazi		
2018	Lottery	Amir Ali	Mohammad Hossein Mahdavian		
2020	Day Zero	Abdolmalek Rigi	Saeid Malekan		
2021	Guidance Patrol 3	Hassan	Saeed Soheili		
2022	The Town	Navid	Ali Hazrati		
2024	Pool & Party	Shahed	Saeed Soheili		
2025	God of War		Hossein Darabi		
TBA	Sohrab's Blood		Mohammad Hossein Mahdavian	Filming	

=== Web ===
Year	Title	Role	Director	Platform	Notes	Ref(s)
2019	Blue Whale	Armin Mashreghi	Fereydoun Jeyrani	Filimo	Main role	

=== Television ===
Year	Title	Role	Director	Network	Notes	Ref(s)
2010	Between Staying and Leaving	Majid	Behrouz Shoeibi	IRIB TV2	TV film	
2011	A Cage for Flying	Ghasem	Yousef Seyyed Mahdavi	IRIB TV1	TV series	

== Awards and nominations ==
Award	Year	Category	Nominated Work	Result
Rabat International Film Festival	2014	Best Actor	A Few Cubic Meters of Love	Won
Fajr Film Festival	2012	Best Supporting Actor	Guidance Patrol	Nominated
Fajr Film Festival	2015	Best Supporting Actor	Crazy Rook	Nominated
Fajr Film Festival	2017	Best Supporting Actor	Guidance Patrol 2	Nominated
Hafez Awards	2019	Best Actor	Lottery	Nominated
Hanoi International Film Festival	2019	Best Actor	The Dark Room	Nominated
Iran Cinema Celebration	2014	Best Actor	A Few Cubic Meters of Love	Won
Iran's Film Critics and Writers Association	2015	Best Supporting Actor	Crazy Rook	Nominated
Kish International Film Festival	2011	Best Male Actor (Video Section)	Between Staying & Leaving	Won
