= 5th Hanoi International Film Festival =

- Opening film: Shoplifters (Japan)
- Closing film: A Fantastic Woman (Chile)
- Location: Hanoi, Vietnam
- Founded: 2010
- Awards: Best Feature Film: The Dark Room (Iran)
- Hosted by: Quý Bình, Diễm Trang, Đức Bảo
- Festival date: October 27–31, 2018
- Website: Website

Hanoi International Film Festival chronology
- 6th 4th

The 5th Hanoi International Film Festival opened on October 27 and closed on October 31, 2018, at Hanoi Friendship Cultural Palace, with the slogan "Cinema - Integration and Sustainable Development" (Vietnamese: "Điện ảnh - Hội nhập và phát triển bền vững").

After 2 rounds of selection, the Organizing Committee selected 147 films from 45 countries and territories to participate in the festival programs. Vietnamese cinema has 1 feature-length film, 10 short films, and 35 films of various genres shown in the Panorama Cinema Program and the Contemporary Vietnamese Film Program. For the first time, the festival has a closing film.

== Programs ==
Many programs are held within the framework of the 5th Hanoi International Film Festival:

Ceremonies - At Hanoi Friendship Cultural Palace, 91 Trần Hưng Đạo Street, Hoàn Kiếm District:

- Opening ceremony: 20:00, Saturday, October 27 (live broadcast on VTV2)
- Closing ceremony: 20:10, Wednesday, October 31 (live broadcast on VTV1)

Professional activities - At Hanoi Daewoo Hotel, 360 Kim Mã Street, Ba Đình District:

- Exhibition Special filming scene in Vietnam (Vietnamese: "Bối cảnh quay phim đặc sắc tại Việt Nam"): October 27–31
- The HANIFF Campus: October 27–30
- The Film Project Market: October 27–30
- Seminar Polish Cinema Highlights (Vietnamese: "Tiêu điểm Điện ảnh Ba Lan"): 09:00 – 12:00 Sunday, October 28
- Seminar Experience of International Success of Iranian Cinema (Vietnamese: "Kinh nghiệm thành công quốc tế của Điện ảnh Iran"): 09:00 - 12:00 Monday, October 29

Movie screenings in theaters:

- National Cinema Center (Room 3, 5, 7, 9): 3rd floor, 87 Láng Hạ Street, Ba Đình District
  - Opening Screening – Shoplifters (Japan) : 15:00 Saturday, October 27
  - Closing Screening – A Fantastic Woman (Chile) : 15:00 Wednesday, October 31
- BHD Star Phạm Ngọc Thạch Movie Theater (Room 1, 2, 4): 8th floor, Vincom Shopping Center, No. 2 Phạm Ngọc Thạch Street, Đống Đa District
- August Cinema Theater (Room 4): 45 Hàng Bài Street, Hoàn Kiếm District
- Kim Đồng Cinema Theater (Room 1, 3): 19 Hàng Bài Street, Hoàn Kiếm District

Outdoor movie screenings - At Lý Thái Tổ Monument Square, Hoàn Kiếm District:

- Movie The Tailor / Cô Ba Sài Gòn (Vietnam) : 20:00 Sunday, October 28
- Movie Anida and Floating Circus (Argentina) : 20:00 Monday, October 29
- Movie Ellipsis (Australia) : 20:00 Tuesday, October 30

== Juries & Mentors ==
=== Juries ===
There are 3 jury panels established for this film festival:

Feature film:

- Oguri Kohei (Japan) , director & screenwriter - Chairman
- Allan Starski (Poland) , production designer & set decorator
- Shahram Mokri (Iran) , director
- Lee Dong-ha (South Korea) , producer
- Ngô Thanh Vân (Vietnam) , actress, director & producer

Short film:

- Jukka-Pekka Laakso (Finland) , director of Tampere Film Festival - Chairman
- Raymond Red (Philippines) , director
- Lý Thái Dũng (Vietnam) , artist & director of photography

Network for Promotion of Asian Cinema (NETPAC):

- Lee Choong-jik (South Korea) , academic, producer & director of Jeonju International Film Festival - Chairman
- Tsengel Davaasambuu (Mongolia) , producer
- Nguyễn Thị Hồng Ngát (Vietnam) , screenwriter & producer

In addition, the "Film Project Market" is jointly organized by Vietnam Cinema Department and BHD/Vietnam Media Corp, including 2 categories: "International Project Market" with 3 outstanding feature film projects from countries in Asia-Pacific region and "Domestic Project Market" include 5 outstanding feature film projects of Vietnam. The best project will receive a prize of VND 50 million sponsored by BHD/Vietnam Media Corp.

=== Mentors for the HANIFF Campus ===
"The HANIFF Campus" is jointly organized by Vietnam Cinema Department and Redbridge Co., Ltd. The camp will have 2 classes under the guidance of:

Directing & Producing Class:

- Homayoon Ass'adian (Iran) , producer, director, screenwriter
- Rouhollah Hejazi (Iran) , producer, director, screenwriter
- Allan Starski (Poland) , director
- Phạm Nhuệ Giang (Vietnam) , director
- Nguyễn Hoàng Điệp (Vietnam) , director

Acting Class

- David Wenham (Australia) , actor, producer
- Đỗ Thị Hải Yến (Vietnam) , actress
  - Guest: Chi Bảo (Vietnam) , actor

== Official Selection - In Competition ==
=== Feature film ===
These 12 films were selected to compete for the official awards in Feature Film category:

English title	Original title	Director(s)	Production country
Anna Karenina: Vronsky's Story	Анна Каренина. История Вронского / Anna Karenina. Istoriya Vronskogo	Karen Shakhnazarov	(Russia)
Eva	Eva	Benoît Jacquot	(France)
First Law, A Shaman's Tale	Ley Primera	Diego Rafecas	(Argentina)
Pale Folks	Blasse Leute	Vladimir Todorović	(Serbia)
Pupa	Pupa	Indrasis Acharya	(India)
Salt is Leaving the Sea	Ave Maryam	Ertanto Robby Soediskam	(Indonesia)
Signal Rock	Signal Rock	Chito S. Roño	(Philippines)
Silent Night	Cicha noc	Piotr Domalewski	(Poland)
Student A	여중생A / Yeojung saeng A	Lee Kyung-sub	(South Korea)
Summer in Closed Eyes	Nhắm mắt thấy mùa hè	Cao Thúy Nhi	(Vietnam)
The Dark Room	اتاق تاریک / Otaghe Tarik	Rouhollah Hejazi	(Iran)
The Name	名前 / Namae	Akihiro Toda	(Japan)

Highlighted title indicates Best Feature Film Award winner.

=== Short film ===
These 29 short films were selected to compete for official awards in Short Film category, divided into 9 screening sessions as follows:

Session 1:

- When the Smoke Collides (32′) (Thailand)
- Hunger (14′) (Mexico)
- Roommate / Bạn cùng phòng (25′) (Vietnam)
- Radio Dolores (Animated, 18′) (Finland) (Czech Republic)

Session 2:

- Gharshelegh (Documentary, 16′) (Iran)
- Su (18′) (Kazakhstan)
- Faucet (15′) (Mexico)

Session 3:

- From a Distance (5′) (Mexico)
- Haru’s New Year (19′) (Japan)
- Snowbirds (48′) (Canada)
- Poliangular (Animated, 8′) (Mexico)

Session 4:

- Happy Family (24′) (Indonesia)
- One Kilo of Fly Wings (Documentary, 30′) (Iran)
- Josephin (Animated, 5′) (Philippines)
- Pas D’yeux (Animated, 4′) (France)
- The Secret of Children / Bí mật của những đứa trẻ (Animated, 10′) (Vietnam)

Session 5:

- Once (35′) (Taiwan)
- Two Children / Hai đứa trẻ (Documentary, 51′) (Vietnam)

Session 6:

- Destiny (14′) (Iran)
- Mother - Earth for All / Một đất mẹ cho tất cả (Documentary, 60′) (Vietnam)
- The Warm Light / Vầng sáng ấm áp (Animated, 10′) (Vietnam)
- The Mannequin / Cậu bé Ma-nơ-canh (Animated, 10′) (Vietnam)

Session 7:

- So Close So Far, the Ancestral Forest / Gần mà xa – Khu rừng của tổ tiên (Documentary, 42′) (Vietnam)
- Homecoming Day / Ngày về (Documentary, 27′) (Vietnam)

Session 8:

- My Hanoi (Documentary, 52′) (France)
- Endless Journey / Hành trình bất tận (Documentary, 50′) (Vietnam)

Session 9:

- Muzeon-Stephan Ramniceanu (Documentary, 52′) (Romania)
- Where is My Route (12′) (Sri Lanka)
- Permanent Resident (20′) (Singapore)

Highlighted title indicates Best Short Film Award winner.

== Official Selection - Out of Competition ==
These feature and short films were selected for out-of-competition programs:

=== Opening ===
- Shoplifters – Kore-eda Hirokazu (Japan)

=== Panorama: World Cinema ===
==== Feature film ====
- Amin & Akvan – Zohal Razavi (Iran)
- Anida and Floating Circus / Anida y el Circo Flotante – Liliana Romero (Argentina)
- The Midwife / Sage Femme – Martin Provost (France) (Belgium)
- Nervous Translation – Shireen Seno (Philippines)
- A Letter to the President – Roya Sadat (Afghanistan)
- Painting Life – Dr. Biju (India)
- Kathaa '72 – Prabin Syangbo (Nepal)
- The Wild Pear Tree / Ahlat Ağacı – Nuri Bilge Ceylan (Turkey) (France) (Germany)
- Father and Son / Cha cõng con – Lương Đình Dũng (Vietnam)
- A Haunting Hitchkie / 히치하이크 – Jeong Hee-jae (South Korea)
- Love+Sling / 레슬러 – Kim Dae-woong (South Korea)
- Delia and Sammy – Therese Cayaba (Philippines)
- Gutland – Govinda Van Maele (Luxembourg) (Belgium) (Germany)
- Talking Money – Sebastian Winkels (Germany) (Switzerland) (Georgia (country))
- Ellipsis – David Wenham (Australia)
- Guang – Quek Shio Chuan (Malaysia)
- The Baggage – Zig Madamba Dulay (Philippines)
- Under Construction / আন্ডার কন্সট্রাকশন – Rubaiyat Hossain (Bangladesh)
- Blood and the Moon – Tommaso Cotronei (Yemen) (Italy)
- The Tree Goddess / වෛෂ්ණාවී – Sumitra Peries (Sri Lanka)
- Tomorrow’s Power – Amy Miller (Canada)
- All You Can Eat Buddha – Ian Lagarde (Canada)
- Die Tomorrow – Nawapol Thamrongrattanarit (Thailand)
- A Ciambra – Jonas Carpignano (Italy)
- Insane Mother / Солиот эх – Ishdorjiin Odonchimeg (Mongolia)
- Looking for Kafka / 愛上卡夫卡 – Jade Y. Chen (Taiwan)
- The Darkest Days of Us / Los días más oscuros de nosotras – Astrid Rondero (Mexico)
- Last of the Elephant Men – Arnaud Bouquet, Daniel Ferguson (Canada) (Cambodia)
- Where I Belong / しゃぼん玉 – Azuma Shinji (Japan)
- Poppy Goes to Hollywood Redux – Sok Visal (Cambodia) (United States)
- Decision: Liquidation / Reshenie o likvidatsii – Aleksandr Aravin (Russia)
- The Seen and Unseen / Sekala Niskala – Kamila Andini (Indonesia) (Netherlands) (Australia) (Qatar)
- On Body and Soul / Testről és lélekről – Ildikó Enyedi (Hungary)
- Night Accident / Tunku kyrsyk – Temirbek Birnazarov (Kyrgyzstan)
- The Kid from the Big Apple / 我来自纽约 – Jess Teong (Malaysia)
- Walking Past the Future / 路過未來 – Li Ruijun (China)
- Stray – Dustin Feneley (New Zealand)
- Pomegranate Orchard / Nar bağı – Ilgar Najaf (Azerbaijan)
- Crossing a Shadow – Augusto Tamayo (Peru)
- Please, Care / Paki – Giancarlo Abrahan (Philippines)

==== Short film ====
Group 1:

- Diapers for Melquiades (19′) (Mexico)
- Fatima Marie Torres and the Invasion of Space Shuttle Pinas 25 (17′) (Philippines)
- It’s Easier to Raise Cattle (17′) (Malaysia)

Group 2:

- Konfrontasi (14′) (Singapore)
- Joko (22′) (Indonesia)
- Employee of the Month (13′) (Philippines) (Singapore)
- Kampung Tapir (Documentary, 17′) (Malaysia)
- The Veiled Willow (21′) (Singapore)

Group 3:

- On This Side (30′) (Japan)
- Smile of Nazareno (15′) (Philippines)
- Still (14′) (Philippines)
- Mother (21′) (Singapore)

=== Country-in-Focus: Poland ===
- Nights and Days / Noce i dnie – Jerzy Antczak (1975)
- Sweet Rush / Tatarak – Andrzej Wajda (2009)
- Ida – Paweł Pawlikowski (2013)
- Plan B – Kinga Dębska (2018)
- The Promised Land / Ziemia obiecana – Andrzej Wajda (1975)
- The Pianist – Roman Polanski (2002)
- Warsaw 44 – Jan Komasa (2014)
- Ashes and Diamonds / Popiół i diament – Andrzej Wajda (1958)
- One Way Ticket to the Moon / Bilet na ksiezyc – Jacek Bromski (2013)

=== Country-in-Selection: Iran ===
- The Home / Ev – Asghar Yousefinejad (2017)
- Taste of Cherry / Ta'm e guilass – Abbas Kiarostami (1997)
- Kupal – Kazem Mollaie (2017)
- A Special Day / Yek rouz bekhosos – Homayoun Assadian (2017)
- The Salesman / Forušande – Asghar Farhadi (2016)
- The White Balloon / Badkonake sefid – Jafar Panahi (1995)
- Reza – Alireza Motamedi (2018)
- Invasion / Hojoom – Shahram Mokri (2017)

=== Contemporary Vietnamese Films (Vietnam) ===
==== Feature film ====
- 100 ngày bên em / 100 Days of Sunshine – Vũ Ngọc Phượng
- 11 niềm hy vọng / 11 Hopes – Robie Nguyễn
- 49 ngày 2 / 49 Days 2 – Nhất Trung
- 798Mười / 798Ten – Dustin Nguyễn
- Bạn gái tôi là sếp / She’s the Boss – Hàm Trần
- Chàng vợ của em / My Mr. Wife – Charlie Nguyễn
- Chờ em đến ngày mai / Until You – Đinh Tuấn Vũ
- Có căn nhà nằm nghe nắng mưa / Like an Old House – Mai Thế Hiệp, Trầm Nguyễn Bình Nguyên
- Cô Ba Sài Gòn / The Tailor – Trần Bửu Lộc, Nguyễn Lê Phương Khanh
- Cô gái đến từ hôm qua / The Girl from Yesterday – Phan Gia Nhật Linh
- Đảo của dân ngụ cư / The Way Station – Hồng Ánh
- Dạ cổ hoài lang / Night Drumbeats Cause Longing for Absent Husband – Nguyễn Quang Dũng
- Em chưa 18 / Jailbait – Lê Thanh Sơn
- Lôi Báo / Be the Hero – Victor Vu
- Ở đây có nắng / Here Comes the Sun – Đỗ Nam
- Sắc đẹp ngàn cân / 200 Pounds Beauty – James Ngô
- Song lang / The Tap Box – Leon Quang Lê
- Tháng năm rực rỡ / Go-Go Sisters – Nguyễn Quang Dũng
- Vệ sĩ Sài Gòn / Saigon Bodyguards – Ochiai Ken
- Việt Nam thời bao cấp / Vietnam's Subsidy Period (Documentary) – Trần Tuấn Hiệp
- Yêu em bất chấp / My Sassy Girl – Văn Công Viễn
- Yêu đi, đừng sợ! / Kiss & Spell – Stephane Gauger

==== Short film ====
Group 1:

- Bố ơi con ước / Daddy, I wish (23′)
- Hồi sinh / Revival (28′)
- Dòng chảy không có tận cùng / Endleess Flow of Life (40′)
- Cóc con Bitus / The Little Toad (10′)

Group 2:

- Nỗi niềm tứ nữ / The Innermost Feelings of the Four (23′)
- Khát vọng Hoàng Sa - Trường Sa / Aspiration of Paracel and Spratly Islands (40′)
- Hành trình hóa giải / The Journey of Reconciliation (35′)
- Cô bé rơm vàng / Little Straw Doll (10′)

Group 3:

- Tâm tình của gốm / Sentiment of Pottery (31′)
- Truyền thuyết chiếc khăn Piêu / Tale of Pieu Scarf (11′)
- Niềm vui làm mật / Making Honey Delight (31′)
- Người anh hùng áo vải / Hero Wearing Duffle (30′)
- Hải Âu bé bỏng / A Little Seagull (10′)

=== Closing ===
- A Fantastic Woman – Sebastián Lelio (Chile)

== Awards ==
The official awards were awarded at the closing ceremony of the festival, on the evening of October 31. Students of the programs "The HANIFF Campus" and "The Film Market Project" were awarded 1 day before, on the evening of October 30.

=== In Competition - Feature film ===
- Best Feature Film: The Dark Room (Iran)
  - Jury Prize for Feature Film: Pale Folks (Serbia)
  - Other nominees: Student A (South Korea) , Silent Night (Poland) , Eva (France)
- Best Director: Piotr Domalewski – Silent Night (Poland)
  - Other nominees: Rouhollah Hejazi – The Dark Room (Iran) , Vladimir Todorović – Pale Folks (Serbia)
- Best Leading Actor: Christian Bables – Signal Rock (Philippines)
  - Other nominees: Saed Soheili – The Dark Room (Iran) , Dawid Ogrodnik – Silent Night (Poland)
- Best Leading Actress: Phương Anh Đào – Summer in Closed Eyes (Vietnam)
  - Other nominees: Sareh Bayat – The Dark Room (Iran) , Kim Hwan-hee – Student A (South Korea)

=== In Competition - Short film ===
- Best Short Film: Su – Aizhana Kassymbek (Kazakhstan)
  - Jury Prize for Short Film: Two Children – Tạ Quỳnh Tư (Vietnam)
  - Other nominee: Happy Family – Eden Junjung (Indonesia)
- Best Young Director of a Short Film: Nguyễn Lê Hoàng Việt – Roommate (Vietnam)

=== NETPAC Award ===
- NETPAC's Award for Asian Cinema Promotion: Student A (South Korea)

=== Audience Choice Award for Vietnamese Film ===
- Most Favourite Out-of-Competition Film: My Mr. Wife (Vietnam)

=== The HANIFF Campus ===
- Best Student - Directing & Producing Class: Crisanto Calvento (Philippines)
- Best Male Student - Acting Class: Công Dương (Vietnam)
- Best Female Student - Acting Class: Vũ Kim Anh (Vietnam)

=== The Film Project Market ===
- Best Project: John Denver Trending – Arden Rod Condez (Philippines)
  - Jury Prize for Film Project: Good Morning, and Good Night! – Chung Chí Công (Vietnam)
  - Other nominees: Binh’s Banh Mi – Andrew Paul (England) , 99 Lives With You – Phạm Hữu Nghĩa (Vietnam) , Little Fishes in Paradise – Nguyễn Khắc Huy (Vietnam)
