= Anahita Dargahi =

Iranian actress (born 1984)

- آناهیتا درگاهی
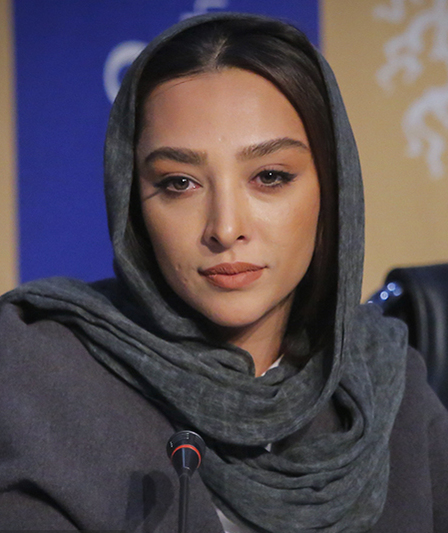
- Dargahi at the 2020 Fajr Film Festival
- Born: January 27, 1984 (age 42); Tehran, Iran
- Occupations: Actress; painter
- Years active: 2015–present
- Spouse: Ashkan Khatibi (m. 2016; div. 2024)

Anahita Dargahi (Persian: آناهیتا درگاهی; born January 27, 1987) is an Iranian actress. She is best known for her roles in the web series Forbidden (2018–2019), I Want to Live (2021), and The North Pole (2024). Dargahi received a Hafez Award nomination for her performance in The Loser Man (2022).

== Early life ==
Anahita Dargahi was born in 1984 in Tehran. She began painting at seven under the instruction of the renowned painter Abbas Katouzian. Having gained accomplishments in her painting career, Dargahi has held several individual exhibitions while actively participating in several group ones in Iran and abroad. She has also designed numerous posters. While a painter and an actor, she was the producer of the music video Parde-ye Ākhar (The Last Act) by Reza Kianian as well as one of Arian Keshishi's concerts.

Dargahi is a stage and movie actress. She learned her first lessons in acting from Farzad Motamen, who gave her a part in his movie Ākharin bār key Sahar rā didi? (When Did You Meet Sahar Last?) in 2015.

Dargahi continued with her academic education in art and did a B.A. in graphics and an M.A. in painting from Tehran University of Art.

She married the actor, singer, and director Ashkan Khatibi in 2016. She is the aunt of footballer Dennis Eckert.

== Career ==
=== Painting ===
Dargahi has held three individual exhibitions of her works at the Niavaran Palace Complex and Seyhoun Gallery and Farmanieh Galleries, all in Tehran. She has also taken part in three group exhibitions at the Museum of Fine Arts of the Sa’dabad Palace Complex, Kamal-ol-Molk Gallery, and Jam Art Gallery in Dubai. Her latest painting exhibition, called “Fasl-e man kojāst?” (“Where Is My Season?”) was held at Ariana Gallery.

=== Acting ===
Dargahi's acting debut was the detective movie Ākharin bār key Sahar rā didi? (When Did You Met Sahar Last?), directed by Farzad Motamen in 2015. Nominated in five categories at the Fajr International Film Festival, the movie brought her to the limelight.

Dargahi went on to star in such movies as Zard (Yellow, directed by Mostafa Taghizadeh, 2016), Dāstan-e Siāvash (The Story of Siavash, by Amir Eskandari, 2017), Ghānun-e Morfi (Murphy’s Law, by Rambod Javan, 2018), Cheshm-o-goush-basteh (The Naïve One, by Farzad Motamen, 2018), Sudabeh (by Mohammad Ali Sajjadi, 2018), Derakht-e Banafsh (The Purple Tree, by Amin Aslani, 2019), Nilgoun (Azure, by Hosein Soheilizadeh, 2019).

She also starred in the TV series Mamnoueh (The Forbidden, by Amir Purkian, 2017) as "Talā Davallou".

Dargahi took roles in a number of plays including Dar entezār-e Ādolf (Waiting for Adolf, by Alireza Koushk Jalali, 2017), Se khāhar (The Three Sisters, by Mohammad-Hasan Ma'jouni, 2017), Dah sāl tanhāyi (Ten Years of Solitude, by Ashkan Khatibi, 2018), Ghahtizadegān (The Famine-stricken, by Ashkan Khatibi, 2019).

== Filmography ==
=== Film ===
Year	Title	Role	Director	Notes	Ref(s)
2015	When Did You See Sahar Last Time?	Katy	Farzad Motamen		
2017	Yellow	Bahar	Mostafa Taghizadeh		
2019	Murphy's Law	Shohreh	Rambod Javan		
2019	Unsophisticated	Nana	Farzad Motamen		
2019	Turquzabad		Ali Shah Hatami		
2020	Shahre Gheseh Cinema		Keyvan Alimohammadi, Ali Akbar Heidari		
2021	The Forth Round	Zahra	Alireza Amini		
2022	The Loser Man	Bahar	Mohammad Hossein Mahdavian		
2023	Hedgehog		Mastaneh Mohajer		
2024	Nilgun		Hossein Soheilizadeh		

=== Web ===
Year	Title	Role	Director	Platform	Ref(s)
2018–2019	Forbidden	Tala Dulu	Amir Pourkian	Filimo	
2021	The Good, The Bad, The Corney: Radioactive	Anahita Madani	Mohsen Chegini	Filimo	
2021	I Want to Live	Shiva Mastour	Sharam Shah Hosseini	Filimo	
2024	The North Pole	Arghavan	Amin Mahmoudi Yekta	Filimo	

== Theatre ==
- Nefrin-e ghahtizadegān (نفرین قحطی‌زدگان) (Ashkan Khatibi, Iranshahr Amphitheater, Samandarian Hall, June 2019)
- Arbāb Pontilā (ارباب پونتیلا) (Mikaeel Shahrestani, based on Mr Puntila and his Man Matti, an epic theatre comedy by Bertolt Brecht)
- Madreseh-ye shabāneh (مدرسهٔ شبانه) (stage reading of a play by Harold Pinter)
- Vaghti khorous ghalat mikhānad (وقتی خروس غلط می‌خوانَد) (Ali Shams)
- Dar entezār-e Ādolf (در انتظار آدولف) (Alireza Koushk Jalali)
- 3 khahar (سه خواهر) (Mohammad-Hasan Ma'jouni, Pāliz Amphitheater, June 2017, based on a play be Anton Chekhov)
- Dah sāl tanhāyi theater-concerto (ده سال تنهایی) (Ashkan Khatibi)
