= Hadi Hejazifar =

Iranian actor, director and screenwriter (born 1976)

- هادی حجازی‌فر
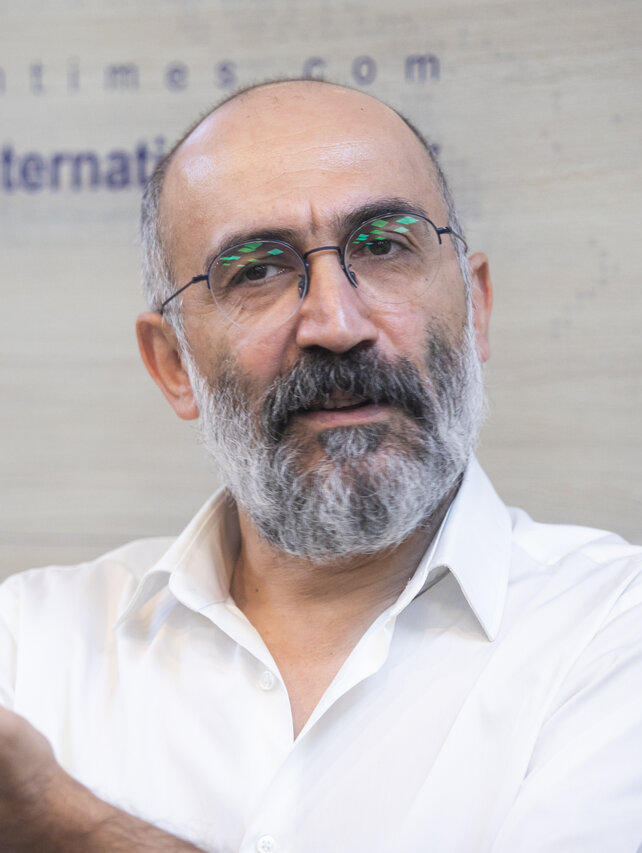
- Hejazifar in October 2023
- Born: June 21, 1976 (age 50); Khoy, West Azerbaijan, Iran
- Education: University of Tehran (BFA); Tarbiat Modares University (MFA)
- Occupations: Actor; director; screenwriter
- Years active: 1994–present
- Spouse: (m.)
- Children: 1

Hadi Hejazifar (Persian: هادی حجازی‌فر; born June 21, 1976) is an Iranian actor, director and screenwriter. He gained attention and received critical acclaim for his performances in films Standing in the Dust (2016), Midday Adventures (2017), Atabai (2020), Majority (2021), and The Lion Skin (2022–2023). He has received various accolades, including a Crystal Simorgh, two Hafez Awards, an Urban International Film Festival Award and two Iran's Film Critics and Writers Association Awards.

== Early life ==
Hadi Hejazifar was born on June 21, 1976, in Khoy, West Azerbaijan, Iran. He is originally an Iranian Azerbaijani.

== Career ==
Before starting his professional career in cinema, he worked as an actor, director and puppeteer. In 2022 for his respected contribution in the field of puppet theatre he was chosen as the chief of Tehran International Puppet Theatre Festival.

== Filmography ==
=== Film ===
Year	Title	Role	Director	Notes	Ref(s)
2004	Fatherly Farm		Rasoul Mollagholipour		
2016	Standing in the Dust	Ahmad Motevaselian	Mohammad Hossein Mahdavian		
2016	Related By Blood		Pedram Pouramiri, Hossein Amiri Doomari	Short film	
2017	Midday Adventures	Kamal	Mohammad Hossein Mahdavian		
2017	The Distance	Yashar	Yousef Kargar	Short film	
2017	Gilda		Keivan Alimohammadi, Omid Bonakdar		
2018	Axing	Maziar	Behrouz Shoeibi		
2018	Lottery	Moosa	Mohammad Hossein Mahdavian		
2018	Damascus Time	Younes	Ebrahim Hatamikia		
2018	Astigmatism	Mohsen	Majid Reza Mostafavi		
2018	Katyusha	Khalil Katyusha	Ali Atshani		
2019	Pig Gene	Reza Kishmish	Saeed Soheili		
2019	Midday Adventures: Trace of Blood	Kamal	Mohammad Hossein Mahdavian		
2019	No Fly Zone	Mostafa	Amir Dasargar		
2019	Kingslayer	Mansour	Vahid Amirkhani		
2020	Atabai	Kazem	Niki Karimi	Also as writer	
2020	Amphibious	Hamid	Borzou Niknejad		
2020	The Painter's Wife	The painter	Soheil Danesh Eshraghi	Short film; unreleased	
2021	Majority	Javaldouz	Mohsen Gharaee		
2022	2888	(voice)	Keyvan Alimohammadi, Ali Akbar Heydari		
2022	The Situation of Mehdi	Mehdi Bakeri	Hadi Hejazifar	Also as writer	
2022	Cue Ball		Majid Salehi		
2024	Breakfast with Giraffes	Doctor	Soroush Sehhat		
2025	Guardian of the Field	Ahmad Piran	Mohammad Reza Kheradmandan		
2026	Jomhuri Street		Manouchehr Hadi		

=== Web ===
Year	Title	Role	Director	Platform	Notes	Ref(s)
2018–2019	Forbidden	Khosrow Rad	Amir Pourkian	Filimo	Supporting role	
2021	Mutual Friendship	Himself	Shahab Hosseini	Namava	Guest appearance; 1 episode	
2021	Predictor	Himself	Reza Baharvan, Amin Entezari	Namava	Guest appearance; 1 episode	
2022–2023	The Lion Skin	Naeem Molaee	Jamshid Mahmoudi	Filmnet	Leading role; 24 episodes	
2023	Vertigo	Kamran Zahedi	Behrang Tofighi	Namava	Recurring role	
2024	Dariush	Dariush	Hadi Hejazifar	Filmnet	Leading role; 13 episodes	
2026	The Crow	Jalal	Mohammad Hossein Mahdavian	Filimo	Leading role; 11 episodes	
TBA	Untitled Homayoun As'adian project		Homayoun As'adian	Filmnet	Leading role	

=== Television ===
Year	Title	Role	Director	Network	Notes	Ref(s)
2015	Window Shade		Hadi Hejazifar	IRIB TV3	TV series; also as writer	
2017	Breath	Hamid	Jalil Saman	IRIB TV3	TV series; supporting role	
2017	Get Together	Himself	Mehran Modiri	IRIB Nasim	TV program; 1 episode	
2018	Khandevaneh	Himself	Rambod Javan	IRIB Nasim	TV program; 1 episode	
2020	Doping	Hassan Asadi	Reza Maghsoudi	IRIB TV3	TV series; main role	
2020	Hoard	Farhad	Jalil Saman	IRIB TV1	TV series; supporting role	
2022	Seven	Himself	Mojtaba Amini	IRIB TV3	TV program; 1 episode	
2023	Ashura	Mehdi Bakeri	Hadi Hejazifar	IRIB TV1	TV mini-series; also as writer	

== Awards and nominations ==
Name of the award ceremony, year presented, category, nominee of the award, and the result of the nomination
Award	Year	Category	Nominated Work	Result	Ref(s)
Art of Revolution Awards	2022	Best Special Individual Achievement	The Situation of Mehdi	Won	
Fajr Film Festival	2017	Best Actor in a Supporting Role	Midday Adventures	Nominated	
Fajr Film Festival	2022	Best Screenplay	The Situation of Mehdi	Nominated	
Fajr Film Festival	2022	Best Director	The Situation of Mehdi	Nominated	
Fajr Film Festival	2022	Best First Film	The Situation of Mehdi	Won	
Fajr Theater Festival	2015	Best Director – Morour of Iranian Theatre	The Visit	Won	
Hafez Awards	2017	Best Actor – Motion Picture	Standing in the Dust	Nominated	
Hafez Awards	2018	Best Actor – Motion Picture	Lottery	Won	
Hafez Awards	2019	Best Actor – Television Series Drama	Forbidden	Nominated	
Hafez Awards	2020	Best Actor – Motion Picture	Midday Adventures: Trace of Blood	Nominated	
Hafez Awards	2023	Best Actor – Television Series Drama	The Lion Skin	Nominated	
Hafez Awards	2023	Best Actor – Motion Picture	Atabai	Nominated	
Hafez Awards	2023	Best Screenplay – Motion Picture	Atabai	Nominated	
Hafez Awards	2023	Best Director – Motion Picture	The Situation of Mehdi	Nominated	
Hafez Awards	2023	Individual Achievement	Himself	Won	
Hafez Awards	2024	Best Actor – Motion Picture	Breakfast with Giraffes	Nominated	
Iran Cinema Celebration	2016	Best Actor in a Leading Role	Standing in the Dust	Nominated	
Iran Cinema Celebration	2017	Best Actor in a Supporting Role	Midday Adventures	Nominated	
Iran's Film Critics and Writers Association	2016	Best Actor in a Leading Role	Standing in the Dust	Nominated	
Iran's Film Critics and Writers Association	2017	Best Actor in a Supporting Role	Midday Adventures	Won	
Iran's Film Critics and Writers Association	2018	Best Actor in a Supporting Role	Lottery	Nominated	
Iran's Film Critics and Writers Association	2022	Best Screenplay	Atabai	Won	
Iran's Film Critics and Writers Association	2022	Best Actor in a Leading Role	Atabai	Nominated	
Iran's Film Critics and Writers Association	2025	Best Actor in a Leading Role	The Situation of Mehdi	Nominated	
Iran's Film Critics and Writers Association	2025	Best Debut Director	The Situation of Mehdi	Nominated	
Iran's Film Critics and Writers Association	2025	Best Director	The Situation of Mehdi	Nominated	
Iran's Film Critics and Writers Association	2025	Best Screenplay	The Situation of Mehdi	Nominated	
Iran's Film Critics and Writers Association	2025	Best Actor in a Supporting Role	Amphibious	Nominated	
Iran's Film Critics and Writers Association	2025	Best Actor in a Supporting Role	Breakfast with Giraffes	Nominated	
Malaysia International Film Festival	2019	Best Supporting Actor	Axing	Nominated	
Resistance International Film Festival	2023	Best Director	The Situation of Mehdi	Won	
Tehran International Short Film Festival Awards	2016	Best Actor in a Leading Role	Related By Blood	Nominated	
Urban International Film Festival	2017	Best Actor	Midday Adventures	Nominated	
Urban International Film Festival	2022	Best Director	The Situation of Mehdi	Won	
Urban International Film Festival	2022	Best Screenplay	The Situation of Mehdi	Nominated	
Urban International Film Festival	2022	Best Actor	The Situation of Mehdi	Nominated	
