= Midday Adventures: Trace of Blood =

- Film poster
- Directed by: Mohammad Hossein Mahdavian
- Written by: Ebrahim Amini; Hoseein Torab Nejad
- Produced by: Seyyed Mahmoud Razavi
- Starring: Behnoosh Tabatabaei; Javad Ezzati; Hadi Hejazifar; Mohsen Kiaei; Hasti Mahdavi; Mahdi Zaminpardaz; Hossein Mehri; Amir Hossein Hashemi
- Cinematography: Hadi Behrooz
- Edited by: Mohammad Najarian
- Music by: Habib Khazaeifar
- Production company: Simaye Mehr
- Distributed by: Simaye Mehr
- Release dates: 30 January 2019 (FIFF); 25 September 2019 (Iran)
- Running time: 125 minutes
- Country: Iran
- Language: Persian
- Box office: 6.2 billion toman (Iran)

Midday Adventures: Trace of Blood (Persian: ماجرای نیمروز: رد خون, romanized: majaraye nimroz: rad khoon) is a 2019 Iranian war drama film directed by Mohammad Hossein Mahdavian and written by Ebrahim Amini and Hoseein Torab Nejad. The film is a sequel to the 2017 film Midday Adventures.

The film screened for the first time at the 37th Fajr Film Festival and was released on September 25, 2019 in Iran theatrically.

== Cast ==
- Behnoosh Tabatabei as Sima
- Javad Ezzati as Sadegh
- Hadi Hejazifar as Kamal
- Mosen Kiaee as Afshin Gohari
- Hasti Mahdavi as Zohre
- Hossein Mehri as Abbas
- Mahdi Zaminpardaz as Masoud
- Amir Hossein Hashemi as Mohammad Hossein Shadkam
- Mohammad Asgari as Ebrahim

== Reception ==
=== Awards and nominations ===
Year	Award	Category	Recipient	Result
2019	Fajr Film Festival	Best Film	Midday Adventures: Trace of Blood	Nominated
2019	Fajr Film Festival	Best Director	Mohammad Hossein Mahdavian	Nominated
2019	Fajr Film Festival	Best Actress in a Leading Role	Behnoosh Tabatabaei	Nominated
2019	Fajr Film Festival	Best Actor in a Supporting Role	Javad Ezzati	Nominated
2019	Fajr Film Festival	Best Cinematography	Hadi Behrooz	Nominated
2019	Fajr Film Festival	Best Editor	Mohammad Najarian	Nominated
2019	Fajr Film Festival	Best Makeup	Shahram Khalaj	Nominated
2019	Fajr Film Festival	Best Visual Effects	Sina Ghavidel	Nominated
2019	Fajr Film Festival	Best Special Effects	Iman Karamian	Won
2019	Fajr Film Festival	Best Costume Design	Mohammadreza Shojaei	Won
2019	Fajr Film Festival	Best Sound Mixing	Mehrshad Malakouti	Won
2019	Fajr Film Festival	Audience Choice of Best Film	Midday Adventures: Trace of Blood	Fifth Place

=== Home media ===
The film was released on April 16, 2020 on home video. It became the most-watched iranian political movie on home video in Iran.
