= Midday Adventures =

- Film poster
- Directed by: Mohammad Hossein Mahdavian
- Written by: Mohammad Hossein Mahdavian; Ebrahim Amini
- Produced by: Habibollah Valinezhad
- Starring: Mehrdad Sedighian; Ahmad Mehranfar; Hadi Hejazifar; Javad Ezzati; Mahdi Zaminpardaz; Mahya Dehghani; Linda Kiani; Hossein Mehri; Mehdi Pakdel; Amir Hossein Hashemi
- Cinematography: Hadi Behrooz
- Edited by: Sajjad Pahlavanzadeh
- Music by: Habib Khazaeifar
- Release dates: 31 January 2017 (Fajr Film Festival); 15 March 2017 (Iran)
- Running time: 108 minutes
- Country: Iran
- Language: Persian

Midday Adventures (Persian: ماجرای نیمروز, romanized: majaraye nimroz) is a 2017 Iranian drama film directed by Mohammad Hossein Mahdavian and written by Mahdavian and Ebrahim Amini. The film centers on the assassinations against government officials in 1982, as well as the events after the dismissal of Abolhassan Banisadr. It screened for the first time at the 35th Fajr Film Festival and was released on March 15, 2017 in Iran.

The film won both Best Film and Audience Choice of Best Film, making it one of only five films in the history of cinema of Iran to win the latter. (the other four are The Glass Agency, Low Heights, In Amethyst Color and Crazy Rook).

== Plot ==
After the dismissal of president Bani-Sadr by the Iranian parliament, tensions became high. Terrorist groups began to assassinate Iranian officials. The Iranian government and the Iranian Revolutionary Guard Corps (IRGC) attempted to arrest these terrorists. A young IRGC member and a woman of the terrorist groups are known each other. They were classmate in college.

== Cast ==
- Mehrdad Sedighian
- Ahmad Mehranfar
- Hadi Hejazifar
- Javad Ezzati
- Mahdi Zaminpardaz
- Mahya Dehghani
- Kian Rostami
- Linda Kiani
- Hossein Mehri
- Mehdi Pakdel
- Amir Hossein Hashemi as Mohammad Hossein Shadkam

== Awards ==
- Crystal Simorgh for Best Film
- Crystal Simorgh for Audience Choice of Best Film
- Crystal Simorgh for Best Costume and Production Design
- Crystal Simorg for Best National Film

== Sequel ==
Midday Adventures: Trace of Blood is the sequel. It screened for the first time on January 30, 2019 at the 37th Fajr Film Festival and was released on September 25, 2019 in Iran.
