= 4th Hanoi International Film Festival =

2016 film festival edition

- Opening film: I, Daniel Blake (United Kingdom) (France)
- Location: Hanoi, Vietnam
- Founded: 2010
- Awards: Best Feature Film: Remember (Canada)
- Hosted by: Ái Phương, Đức Bảo
- Festival date: November 1–5, 2016
- Website: Website

Hanoi International Film Festival chronology
- 5th 3rd

The 4th Hanoi International Film Festival opened on November 1 and closed on November 5, 2016, at Hanoi Friendship Cultural Palace, with the slogan "Cinema - Integration and Sustainable Development" (Vietnamese: "Điện ảnh - Hội nhập và phát triển bền vững").

From more than 500 films submitted, 146 films from 33 countries were selected for screening, of which 12 long films and 30 short films participated in the competition.

== Programs ==
Ceremonies - At Hanoi Friendship Cultural Palace, 91 Trần Hưng Đạo Street, Hoàn Kiếm District:

- Opening ceremony: 20:00 Tuesday, November 1 (live broadcast on VTV2)
- Closing ceremony: 20:00 Saturday, November 5 (live broadcast on VTV1)

Professional activities - At Hanoi Daewoo Hotel, 360 Kim Mã Street, Ba Đình District:

- Exhibition of Vietnam Film Institute: Vietnamese context in foreign films (Vietnamese: "Bối cảnh Việt Nam trong phim nước ngoài"), from Tuesday morning, November 1 to November 5
- The HANIFF Campus and The Film Project Market: from Tuesday morning, November 1 to Friday evening, November 4. This year, these two activities are held in parallel.
- Seminars:
  - Cooperation in film production and distribution among ASEAN countries (Vietnamese: "Hợp tác sản xuất, phát hành phim giữa các nước ASEAN"): Wednesday, November 2
  - Indian cinema - cooperation and development (Vietnamese: "Điện ảnh Ấn Độ - hợp tác và phát triển"): Thursday, November 3
- Film showcase reception of The Way Station / Đảo của dân ngụ cư, directed by Hồng Ánh

Movie screenings in theaters: 6 cinemas in Hanoi participated in screening the film during the 5 days of the festival. The National Cinema Center is the only place to issue tickets for all cinema clusters, starting from October 29. All screenings are free.

- National Cinema Center (87 Láng Hạ Street) has 75 screenings with contested films of the two most important categories, which are contested feature-length films and contested short films. There are also Asean films, Indian films, films in the World Cinema Panorama program.
  - Opening screenings: Tuesday afternoon, November 1, instead after the opening ceremony as before
- August Theater and Kim Đồng Theater (45 and 19 Hàng Bài Street) have 50 screenings, of which 28 are for Vietnamese films, 5 for Italian films and 17 for films in the World Cinema Panorama program.
- Ngọc Khánh Theater (523 Kim Mã Street) has 24 screenings, of which 3 are for short films, 3 for Vietnamese films, 6 for films in the World Cinema Panorama program, 7 for Asean films, 5 for Italian movies.
- CGV Cinemas, 6th floor, Vincom Center, 54A Nguyễn Chí Thanh Street
- CGV Cinemas, 5th floor, Mipec Tower, 229 Tây Sơn Street

Outdoor movie screenings and shows - At Lý Thái Tổ Monument Square, Hoàn Kiếm District:

- Movie Miracle in Milan (Italy) with Italian fashion show by designer Riccardo Bianco: Wednesday night, November 2
- Documentary SMTown: The Stage (South Korea) and the exchange with Korean singer Jis and Juni from the group Offroad: Thursday night, November 3
- Movie Taxi, What’s Your Name? / Taxi, em tên gì? (Vietnam) with the Ao dai fashion show by designer Lan Hương: Friday night, November 4

== Juries & Mentors ==
=== Juries ===
3 juries panels were established for this festival:

Feature film:

- Régis Wargnier (France) , director, producer, screenwriter - Chairman
- Geraldine Chaplin (United States) , actress
- Adoor Gopalakrishnan (India) , director, screenwriter, producer
- Iza Calzado (Philippines) , actress
- Đào Bá Sơn (Vietnam) , director

Short film:

- Maxine Williamson (Australia) , Artistic Director of Asia Pacific Screen Awards and Brisbane International Film Festival - Chairman
- Philip Cheah, film critic, founder of Singapore International Film Festival
- Nguyễn Thị Phương Hoa (Vietnam) , animation director, animator

Network for Promotion of Asian Cinema (NETPAC):

- Ed Lejano (Philippines) , director, producer, managing director of QCinema International Film Festival - Chairman
- Udi Aloni (Israel) , filmmaker, writer, visual artist
- Đoàn Minh Tuấn (Vietnam) , screenwriter, Deputy Editor-in-Chief of Thế Giới Điện Ảnh Magazine

=== Mentors for the HANIFF Campus ===
Classes at the HANIFF Campus this year received instruction from:

- Jo Sung-hee (South Korea) , director
- Kwon Seung-hwi (South Korea) , screenwriter
- Maike Mia Höhne (Germany) , Head of Berlinale Shorts of the Berlin International Film Festival

== Official Selection - In Competition ==
=== Feature film ===
These 12 films were selected to compete for the official awards in Feature Film category:

| English title | Original title | Director(s) | Production country |
|---|---|---|---|
| Birds with Large Wings | വലിയ ചിറകുള്ള പക്ഷികൾ / Valiya Chirakulla Pakshikal | Dr. Biju | (India) |
| Blossoming Into a Family | 惑う After the Rain / Madou: After the Rain | Hayashi Hiroki | (Japan) |
| Cemetery of Splendour † | รักที่ขอนแก่น / Rak Ti Khon Kaen | Apichatpong Weerasethakul | (Thailand) |
| Fundamentally Happy † | 本质上快乐 | Lei Yuan Bin, Tan Bee Thiam | (Singapore) |
| Green Carriage † | Зелёная карета / Zelyonaya Kareta | Oleg Assadulin | (Russia) |
| Inadaptable † | عادت نمی کنیم / Adat Nemikonim | Ebrahim Ebrahimian | (Iran) |
| Jackpot | Trúng số | Dustin Nguyễn | (Vietnam) |
| Marguerite | Marguerite | Xavier Giannoli | (France) (Czech Republic) (Belgium) |
| One Way Trip † | 글로리데이 / Geulroridei (Glory Days) | Choi Jeong-yeol | (South Korea) |
| Ordinary People † | Pamilya ordinaryo | Eduardo Roy Jr. | (Philippines) |
| Remember † | Remember | Atom Egoyan | (Canada) |
| Yellow Flowers on the Green Grass | Tôi thấy hoa vàng trên cỏ xanh | Victor Vu | (Vietnam) |

The dagger † indicates films labeled NC 16
Highlighted title indicates Best Feature Film Award winner.

=== Short film ===
These 30 short films were selected to compete for official awards in Short Film category, divided into 5 screening sessions as follows:

Session 1:

- Mr. Mirror Man (Animated, 10′) (Mexico)
- Three Variations on Ofelia (15′) (Mexico)
- The Bridge (18′) (South Korea)
- Love Comes Later (10′) (United States) (India)
- A New Home (15′) (Slovenia)
- I Love Anna (11′) (Finland)
- Young Mother on Vài Thai Peak / Người mẹ trẻ trên đỉnh Vài Thai (Docu., 29′) (Vietnam)

Session 2:

- Suspendu (15′) (Switzerland)
- To the Top (17′) (Switzerland)
- Day Before Chinese New Year (Documentary, 23′) (China)
- God Must Be Deaf (Animated, 8′) (Sri Lanka)
- Sweet Bloom of Nighttime Flower (15′) (Singapore)
- Dedicated to Grandpa Điều / Dành tặng ông Điều (Documentary, 23′) (Vietnam)

Session 3:

- Study of a Singaporean Face (Documentary, 4′) (Singapore)
- Heart of the Land (Documentary, 30′) (Finland)
- Distance Between Us (27′) (South Korea)
- Different (6′) (Uzbekistan)
- Seide (12′) (Kyrgyzstan)
- Another City / Một thành phố khác (25′) (Vietnam)

Session 4:

- Sibol (18′) (Philippines)
- Agus and Agus (16′) (Indonesia)
- Kousayla (20′) (Algeria) (Switzerland)
- The Moon of Seoul (22′) (South Korea)
- Everlasting Hope / Vọng phu nơi đầu sóng (Documentary, 30′) (Vietnam)

Session 5:

- White Cat and Black Cat / Mèo Trắng và Mèo Mun (Animated, 10′) (Vietnam)
- The Surfaces / Những mặt phẳng (Animated, 10′) (Vietnam)
- The Sunflower / 'Bông hoa mặt trời (Animated, 10′) (Vietnam)
- Aspiration for Life / Khát vọng người (Documentary, 28′) (Vietnam)
- Pleco Fish / Cá dọn bể (13′) (Vietnam)
- Tomorrow / Ngày mai (15′) (Vietnam)

Highlighted title indicates Best Short Film Award winner.

== Official Selection - Out of Competition ==
These films were selected for out-of-competition screening programs:

The dagger † indicates films labeled NC 16

=== Opening ===
- I, Daniel Blake – Ken Loach (United Kingdom) (France)

=== Panorama: World Cinema ===
==== Feature film ====
- 3 Heroines / 3 Srikandi – Iman Brotoseno (Indonesia)
- 3/4 – Maike Mia Höhne (Germany)
- All of a Sudden / Auf Einmal – Aslı Özge (Germany) †
- Candy Boys / お江戸のキャンディー – Reona Hirota (Japan) †
- Certified Dead – Marrie Lee (Singapore)
- Cinemawala / সিনেমাওয়ালা – Kaushik Ganguly (India)
- Destiny / 喜禾 – Zhang Wei (China)
- Drought and Lies / دروغ, فیلم خشکسالی و دروغ – Pedram Alizadeh (Iran)
- Fate of a Man / Судьба человека – Sergei Bondarchuk (Russia)
- I Am Nojoom, Age 10 and Divorced / أنا نجوم بنت العاشرة ومطلقة – Khadija al-Salami (Yemen)
- Immortality / جاودانگی – Mehdi Fard Ghaderi (Iran)
- Indochine – Régis Wargnier (France)
- Invisible / Imbisibol – Lawrence Fajardo (Philippines)
- Junction 48 / ג'נקשן 48 – Udi Aloni (Israel) †
- Lantouri / لانتوری – Reza Dormishian (Iran)
- Lenin Park / Parque Lenin – Itziar Leemans, Carlos Mignon (Mexico)
- Let Her Cry / ඇගේ ඇස අග – Asoka Handagama (Sri Lanka) †
- Lost Daughter / 台灣電影網 – Chen Yujie (Taiwan)
- Louder Than Bombs – Joachim Trier (Norway) (France) (Denmark) †
- Love, Supermoon – Wan Hasliza Wan Zainuddin (Malaysia)
- Love, Lies / 해어화 – Park Heung-sik (South Korea)
- Masaan / मसान – Neeraj Ghaywan (India)
- My Skinny Sister / Min lilla syster – Sanna Lenken (Sweden)
- Nakom – Kelly Daniela Norris, T. W. Pittman (Ghana) (United States)
- News from Planet Mars / Des nouvelles de la planète Mars – Dominik Moll (France)
- Next to Me / Pored mene – Stevan Filipović (Serbia) †
- Paradise Trips – Raf Reyntjens (Netherlands) (Belgium)
- Paths of the Soul / གངས་རིན་པོ་ཆེ (冈仁波齐) – Zhang Yang (China) (Documentary)
- River / ང་པོ། (河) – Sonthar Gyal (China) (Tibet)
- Shadow Kill / നിഴൽക്കുത്ത് – Adoor Gopalakrishnan (India)
- Southside with You – Richard Tanne (United States)
- Son of Saul / Saul fia – László Nemes (Hungary) †
- Sunka Raku / Sunka Raku: Alegría Evanescente – Hari Sama (Mexico) (Documentary)
- Tandem – King Palisoc (Philippines) †
- The Brand New Testament / Le Tout Nouveau Testament – Jaco Van Dormael (Belgium) (France) (Luxembourg) †
- Timgad – Fabrice Benchaouche (France)
- Walnut Tree / Жаңғақ тал – Yerlan Nurmukhambetov (Kazakhstan)
- Wastelands – Miriam Heard (Chile) (United Kingdom)
- White Lies, Black Lies / 失控謊言 – Lou Yian (Taiwan)
- Wolf Totem / 狼图腾 – Jean-Jacques Annaud (China) (France)
- Yen's Life / Cuộc đời của Yến – Đinh Tuấn Vũ (Vietnam)

==== Short film ====
Berlinale Shorts: Session 1

- A Man Returned (30′) (United Kingdom) (Denmark) (Netherlands) †
- Freud and Friends (30′) (Portugal) (Switzerland) †
- Ten Meter Tower / Hopptornet (17′) (Sweden) †
- In the Soldier's Head (Animated, 4′) (United States) (France) †
- Moms On Fire (Animated, 13′) (Sweden) †

Berlinale Shorts: Session 2

- Batrachian's Ballad / Balada de um Batráquio (Documentary, 11′) (Portugal) †
- Love (Animated, 15′) (France) (Hungary) †
- Personne (15′) (Germany) †
- Reluctantly Queer (8′) (United States) (Ghana) †
- Jin Zhi Xia Mao / Anchorage Prohibited (Documentary, 16′) (Taiwan) †

7 Letters: Singaporean Session

- Cinema (20′) (Singapore)
- That Girl (18′) (Singapore)
- The Flame (17′) (Singapore)
- Bunga Sayang (12′) (Singapore)
- Pineapple Town (15′) (Singapore)
- Parting (12′) (Singapore)
- GPS (Grandma Position System) (23′) (Singapore)

World-wide Session

- When the Heron Flies (18′) (France)
- Barnyard Acer (Animated, 15′) (Mexico)
- The Last Supper (6′) (Mexico)
- Pickman's Model (Animated, 11′) (Mexico)
- Operation Commando (21′) (Switzerland)
- Zéro m2 (19′) (France)
- The Dog's Lullaby (10′) (Philippines)
- A Halt (6′) (Finland)
- The Teacher and Flowers / El maestro y la flor (Animated, 9′) (Mexico)
- Returned (12′) (Sri Lanka)

=== Country-in-Focus: India ===
- Brother Bajrangi / Bajrangi Bhaijaan – Kabir Khan (2015)
- In Greed We Trust / Moh Maya Money – Munish Bhardwaj (2016)
- Interrogation / Visaranai – Vetrimaaran (2015) †
- Sohra Bridge – Bappaditya Bandopadhyay (2016)
- The Quest / Pather Sandhan – Sikta Biswas (2016)

=== Country-in-Selection: Italy ===
- Caterina in the Big City / Caterina va in città – Paolo Virzì (2003)
- Journey to Italy / Viaggio in Italia – Roberto Rossellini (1954)
- Me, Them and Lara / Io, loro e Lara – Carlo Verdone (2010)
- Miracle in Milan / Miracolo a Milano – Vittorio De Sica (1951)
- Rocco and His Brothers / Rocco e i suoi fratelli– Luchino Visconti (1960)

=== ASEAN Films ===
- Above It All / ນ້ອຍ (Noy) – Anysay Keola (Laos)
- Coffee Philosophy / Filosofi Kopi – Angga Dwimas Sasongko (Indonesia)
- Diamond Island / កោះពេជ្រ – Davy Chou (Cambodia)
- Jagat / ஜாகட் – Shanjey Kumar Perumal (Malaysia)
- The Island Funeral / มหาสมุทรและสุสาน (Maha samut lae susaan) – Pimpaka Towira
  (Thailand)
- The Return / 回乡 – Green Zeng (Singapore)
- Water Lemon – Lemuel Lorca (Philippines)
- What's So Special About Rina? / Ada Apa Dengan Rina – Harlif Haji Mohamad, Farid Azlan Ghani (Brunei)
- Zodiac 12: Five Steps of Love / 12 chòm sao: Vẽ đường cho yêu chạy – Vũ Ngọc Phượng (Vietnam)

=== Contemporary Vietnamese Films (Vietnam) ===
- Bao giờ có yêu nhau / I'll Wait – Dustin Nguyễn
- Chàng trai năm ấy / Dandelion – Nguyễn Quang Huy
- Cô hầu gái / The Housemaid – Derek Nguyen
- Em là bà nội của anh / Sweet 20 – Phan Gia Nhật Linh
- Mỹ nhân / Beautiful Woman – Đinh Thái Thụy
- Nhà tiên tri / The Prophecy – Vương Đức
- Người trở về / Returnee – Đặng Thái Huyền
- Nữ đại gia / The Rich Woman – Lê Văn Kiệt
- Quyên / Farewell, Berlin Wall – Nguyễn Phan Quang Bình
- Taxi, em tên gì? / Taxi, What's Your Name? – Đỗ Đức Thịnh, Đinh Tuấn Vũ
- Tấm Cám: Chuyện chưa kể / Tam Cam: The Untold Story – Ngô Thanh Vân
- Thầu Chín ở Xiêm / Ho Chi Minh in Siam – Bùi Tuấn Dũng
- Trên đỉnh bình yên / On the Peaceful Peak – Hữu Mười
- Truy sát / Tracer – Cường Ngô
- Yêu / Love – Việt Max

=== Outdoor Screening ===
- SMTown: The Stage – Bae Sung-sang (South Korea) (Documentary)

== Awards ==
The official awards were awarded at the closing ceremony of the festival, on the evening of November 5. The HANIFF Campus and Film Project Market organized their own awards ceremony for their participants in the previous night.

=== In Competition - Feature film ===
- Best Feature Film: Remember (Canada)
  - Jury Prize for Feature Film: One Way Trip (South Korea)
  - Special Mention for Feature Film: Yellow Flowers on the Green Grass (Vietnam)
  - Other nominees: Ordinary People (Philippines) , Blossoming Into a Family (Japan)
- Best Director: Eduardo Roy Jr. – Ordinary People (Philippines)
  - Other nominees: Choi Jeong-yeol – One Way Trip (South Korea) , Atom Egoyan – Remember (Canada)
- Best Leading Actor: Christopher Plummer – Remember (Canada)
  - Other nominees: Joshua Lim – Fundamentally Happy (Singapore) , Ronwaldo Martin – Ordinary People (Philippines)
- Best Leading Actress: Hasmine Killip – Ordinary People (Philippines)
  - Other nominees: Ninh Dương Lan Ngọc – Jackpot (Vietnam) , Adibah Noor – Fundamentally Happy (Singapore)

=== In Competition - Short film ===
- Best Short Film: Three Variations on Ofelia – Paulo Riqué (Mexico)
  - Jury Prize for Short Film: Heart of the Land – Kaisa 'Kaika' Astikainen (Finland)
  - Other nominees: Study of a Singaporean Face – Kan Lumé & Megan Wonowidjoyo (Singapore) , Another City – Phạm Ngọc Lân (Vietnam) , The Surfaces – Trần Khánh Duyên (Vietnam)
- Best Young Director of a Short Film: Phạm Ngọc Lân – Another City (Vietnam)

=== NETPAC Award ===
- NETPAC's Award for Asian Cinema Promotion: Green Carriage (Russia)

=== Audience Choice Award for Vietnamese Film ===
- Most Favourite In-Competition Film: Jackpot (Vietnam)
- Most Favourite Out-of-Competition Film: Taxi, What's Your Name? (Vietnam)

=== The HANIFF Campus ===
- Best Student - Producing Class: Nguyễn Hà Lê (Vietnam)
- Best Student - Screenwriting Class: Đào Thu Hằng (Vietnam)
- Best Student - Directing Class: Lê Quỳnh Anh, Hà Nguyễn Quang Thái, Nguyễn Lương Diệu Hằng (Team) (Vietnam)

=== The Film Project Market ===
- Best Project: One Summer Day – Wera Aung (Myanmar)
  - Jury Prize for Film Project: Roommate Service – Nguyễn Lê Hoàng Việt (Vietnam)
  - Other nominees: XXYY – Nguyễn Mỹ Trang (Vietnam) , Culi Never Cries – Phạm Ngọc Lân (Vietnam) , Those Who Survive – Stuart Howe (United Kingdom) , Han Mac Tu prequel – Lê Hoàng An (Vietnam) , 7 Bullets – Doris Young (Singapore) , Song in My Heart – Danny Đỗ (Vietnam)
