= The Dark Room (2018 film) =

2018 film by Rouhollah Hejazi

- Directed by: Rouhollah Hejazi
- Written by: Rouhollah Hejazi
- Produced by: Rouhollah Hejazi
- Starring: Sareh Bayat; Saed Soheili
- Edited by: Reza Shahbazi
- Music by: Karen Homayounfar
- Release date: 3 February 2018 (Fajr Film Festival)
- Running time: 101 minutes
- Country: Iran
- Language: Persian

The Dark Room (Persian: اتاق تاریک) is a 2018 Iranian drama directed, written and produced by Rouhollah Hejazi.

The subject of this film is the persecution and rape of children in Iran.

Hejazi went to the thirty-sixth Fajr Film Festival with The Dark Room three years after his latest release, Death of the Fish.

It won Best Film at the Hanoi International Film Festival and at the Film Festival of Kerala in 2018. It was the only representative of Iran at the Belgrade Film Festival in 2019.

== Plot ==
Farhad, Haleh and their four-year-old son Amir move into a new housing complex. One day, Amir gets lost in the desert in front of the complex. His parents find him, but Amir seems upset and Farhad suspects that someone has abused their son.

== Cast ==
- Saed Soheili as Farhad
- Sareh Bayat as Haleh
- Alireza Mirsalari as Amir
- Morvarid Kashian as Pegah
- Amir Reza Ranjbaran as Peyman

== Accolades ==
Award / Film Festival	Category	Recipient(s)	Result
International Film Festival of Kerala	Suvarna Chakoram (Best Film)	The Dark Room	Won
Hanoi International Film Festival	Best Film	The Dark Room	Won
Hanoi International Film Festival	The Best Actor	Saed Soheili	Nominated
Belgrade Film Festival	Best Film	The Dark Room	Nominated
