= Heihat =

- هیهات
- Directed by: Hadi Naeji, Danesh Eghbashawi, Rouhollah Hejazi and Hadi Moghadamdoost
- Produced by: Mohammad Reza Shafiei (Production of Owj Arts and Media Organization)
- Release date: 6 October 2016
- Country: Iran
- Language: Persian

Heihat (Persian: هیهات) is an Iranian film directed/written by Hadi Naeji, Danesh Eghbashawi, Rouhollah Hejazi and Hadi Moghadamdoost. This film produced by Mohammad Reza Shafiei. It (Heihat) deals with the subject of Ashura culture in the present time in four narratives, two of which are linked to the sacred defense and war.

The first story is regards to a young person, whose name is Rahman. This man has a sick mother in the corner of the house and is unable to go to the shrine of Hussein ibn Ali due to her illness and disability. This episode takes place in the city of Shushtar in Khuzestan in the present day.

The actors of this film include:

- Hamed Behdad,
- Khosrow Shahraz,
- Fatemeh Mortazi,
- Shahram Metwally,
- Baharan Bani Ahmadi,
- Abolghasem Gazerzadeh

etc.

== Location ==
The film "Heihat" was completed after seventy filming sessions in locations in Khuzestan Province (the cities of Abadan and Khorramshahr) and in Iraq (the cities of Karbala and Najaf).

== Movie Summary ==
Episode One: The story of an old mother who has been longing for the pilgrimage to Karbala for many years, and now the passing of the new shrine of Hussein bin Ali from her place of residence has provided her with an opportunity to visit at least the new shrine of Hussein bin Ali at the end of her life.

Episode Two: The story of this part is centered around the character of Farid Mousavi, one of the commanders during the Iran-Iraq War. He, who is going to the pilgrimage to Arbaeen with his family, faces a serious problem on the eve of the trip that many young people have taken steps to solve and failed. Farid Mousavi leaves his Arbaeen trip unfinished and creates an epic that at every moment, references to the epic of Abbas bin Ali are evident.

Episode Three: The story of the life of "Ala", a young Iraqi girl, and her mother, in difficult financial circumstances and without a father who risked his life on landmines left behind by the war, is in itself emotional and sad. The director has transformed it into a full-fledged shrine by adding images of the Two Holy Mosques and the shrine of Hussein bin Ali. Instead of begging, Alaa, inspired by her mother's spirit of freedom and independence, starts producing Karbala seals and enriches her life by selling them.

Episode 4: Narges and her son travel to Karbala to see Murtaza, who has been staying in Karbala for a long time as a pilgrim doctor. But Narges cannot find my husband, and from here, Narges and Murtaza's conversations in cyberspace slowly introduce their audience to the work Murtaza has been doing. Murtaza in this story has now become a defender of the shrine and is on the front lines of the battle against the Takfiris.

== Language ==
In addition to Persian language, the movie "Heihat" was scheduled for Friday, September 15, with a translation and interpretation into Arabic (Amir Shabanizadeh).
