= Standing in the Dust =

- Film poster
- Directed by: Mohammad Hossein Mahdavian
- Written by: Mohammad Hossein Mahdavian
- Produced by: Habibollah Valinezhad
- Starring: Hadi Hejazifar; Amir Hossein Hashemi; Farhad Fadakar; Emad Mohammadi; Ebrahim Amini
- Cinematography: Hadi Behrooz
- Edited by: Sajjad Pahlavanzadeh
- Music by: Habib Khazaeifar
- Production company: Owj Arts and Media Organization
- Release date: February 1, 2016 (Fajr Film Festival)
- Running time: 98 minutes
- Country: Iran
- Language: Persian

Standing in the Dust or Standing in the Mist (Persian: ایستاده در غبار, romanized: Istadeh Dar Ghobar) is a 2016 biographical drama film about Ahmad Motevaselian, an Iranian commander in the Iran-Iraq war, who disappeared in Lebanon. The film is directed by Mohammad Hossein Mahdavian and produced by Habibollah Valinezhad.

== Synopsis ==
Ahmad is an army commander who must confront the enemy at the gates of the Khorramshahr, But his fate is determined far from the Iranian border. The movie depicts the real-life events of this great commander who is regarded as one of Iran's most well-respected contemporary national heroes.

== Cast ==
- Hadi Hejazifar (as Ahmad Motevaselian)
- Amir Hossein Hashemi (as Mojtaba Asgari)
- Farhad Fadakar (as Mohammad Ebrahim Hemmat)
- Emad Mohammadi (as Hossein Hamedani)
- Ebrahim Amini (as Mohsen Vazvaei)

== Awards ==
The film won

- Crystal Simorgh for Best Film
- Crystal Simorg for Best Special and Visual Effects
- Crystal Simorg for Best Production and Costume Design
- Special Jury Award for First Film Competition - Best Directing

at the 34th Fajr Film Festival.

=== Nominated ===
Also nominated for:

- Best Director
- Best Screenplay
- Best Editing
- Best Sound
- Best Makeup
- Best Film, Audience Award
