= Warsaw Film Festival =

Annual film festival held in Warsaw, Poland

- Warsaw International Film Festival logo
- Location: Warsaw, Poland
- Founded: 1985
- Most recent: 2025
- Hosted by: Warsaw Film Foundation
- No. of films: 84
- Festival date: Opening: October 10, 2025; Closing: October 19, 2025
- Language: Polish; English
- Website: wff.pl

Current: 41st
- 42nd 40th

Warsaw Film Festival (Polish: Warszawski Festiwal Filmowy; WFF), also known as Warsaw International Film Festival, is an annual international film festival held every October in Warsaw, Poland.

The 40th edition of the festival took place from 11 to 20 October 2024. The 41st edition of the festival took place from 10 to 19 October 2025, and showcases 112 features and 56 shorts.

== History ==
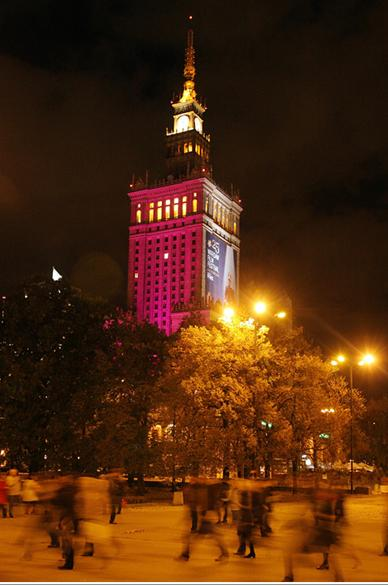
Palace of Culture and Science with a huge poster for Warsaw Film Festival

The festival has been held every year since 1985.

In 2008, it was recognised by FIAPF as an international competitive film festival.

Timeline

- 1985 – Film Discussion Club "Hybrydy" founds the festival, originally named Warsaw Film Week. Creator Roman Gutek becomes its first director
- 1991 – Stefan Laudyn becomes new director of the festival and name Warsaw Film Week changes to Warsaw Film Festival
- 1995 – organised by Warsaw Film Foundation for the first time
- 2000 – festival gets accreditation from FIAPF and changes its name to Warsaw International Film Festival.
- 2005 – for the first time, FIAPF jury gives special awards during Warsaw International Film Festival
- 2008 – FIAPF adds Warsaw Film Festival to its list of international festivals, accredited as a competitive film festival specialised in first and second features and films from Central and Eastern Europe

== Description ==
The festival is host to the International Federation of Film Critics awards for enterprising filmmaking in Central Europe and beyond.

=== Programmes ===
The programme consists of the following sections:

- The International Competition – premiering competition for international features
- 1–2 Competition – for 1st and 2nd feature films
- Free Spirit Competition – competition for independent, innovative, rebellious feature length fiction and documentary films from all over the world.
- Documentary Competition
- Shorts Competition – For narrative, documentary and animated shorts (up to 40 minutes) from all over the world. Winners are Academy Awards eligible.
- Special Screenings – non competitive section dedicated to acclaimed filmmakers from all over the world
- Discoveries
- Family Cinema Weekend

All the films presented, regardless of the section (competitive or non-competitive), are eligible for the Audience Award.

=== Juries ===
- International Competition Jury
- The Competition 1–2 Jury
- Free Spirit Competition Jury
- Documentary Competition Jury
- Shorts Competition Jury
- Jury FIPRESCI
- Jury NETPAC
- Ecumenical jury – by SIGNIS

== Award winners ==
=== International Competition winners ===
Warsaw Grand Prix (called the Grand Prix Nescafé from 2002 until 2007, 18th-23rd edition)

Year	Film	Original title	Director	Country
2002	Edi	Edi	Piotr Trzaskalski	Poland
2003	With Love, Lilly	Russian: С любовью, Лиля (S luboviu, Lilia)	Larisa Sadilova	Russia
2004	The Beautiful City	Persian: شهر زیبا (Shahr-e Ziba)	Asghar Farhadi	Iran
2005	Sorry for Kung Fu	Oprosti za kung fu	Ognjen Sviličić	Croatia
2006	Euphoria	Russian: Эйфория (Eyforia)	Ivan Vyrypaev	Russia
2007	Night Train	Chinese: 夜行列车; Chinese: 夜行列车; pinyin: Yè háng lièchē	Yi'nan Diao	China / Hong Kong / France
2008	Yuri's Day	Russian: Юрьев день (Yurev Den)	Kirill Serebrennikov	Russia / Germany
2009	Lourdes	Lourdes	Jessica Hausner	Austria / France / Germany
2010	Incendies	Incendies	Denis Villeneuve ≈	Canada
2011	Rose	Róża	Wojciech Smarzowski	Poland
2012	Tango Libre	Tango Libre	Frédéric Fonteyne	Belgium / France / Luxembourg
2013	Ida	Ida	Paweł Pawlikowski	Poland
2014	The Coffin In the Mountain	Chinese: 心迷宫; pinyin: Xīn mígōng	Xin Yukun	China
2015	Neon Bull	Boi Neon	Gabriel Mascaro	Brazil
2016	Malaria	Persian: مالاریا (Malaria)	Parviz Shahbazi	Iran
2017	To Kill a Watermelon	Chinese: 杀瓜; pinyin: Shā guā	Zehao Gao	China
2018	The Delegation	Delegacioni	Bujar Alimani	Albania
2019	Shindisi	Shindisi	Dito Tsintsadze	Georgia
2020	18 Kilohertz	18 килогерц	Farkhat Sharipov	Kazakhstan
2021	Miracle	Miracol	Bogdan George Apetri	Romania / Czech Republic / Latvia
2022	May Labour Day	Praznik rada	Pjer Žalica	Bosnia and Herzegovina
2023	The Shadow of Catire	La sombra del Catire	Jorge Hernandez Aldana	Venezuela / Mexico
2024	Traffic	Reostat	Teodora Ana Mihai	Romania / Belgium / Netherlands
2025	Nino		Pauline Loqués	France
