= Green Carriage =

- Russian: Зелёная карета
- Directed by: Oleg Asadulin
- Written by: Artyom Vitkin
- Produced by: Renat Davletyarov
- Starring: Andrey Merzlikin; Viktoriya Isakova; Anna Chipovskaya
- Cinematography: Andrey Ivanov
- Edited by: Ekaterina Pivneva
- Music by: Yevgeny Rudin
- Production companies: Propeller Production; Revolution Film; Real Dakota; Aristocrat
- Release date: November 26, 2015
- Running time: 93 min.
- Country: Russia
- Language: Russian

Green Carriage (Russian: Зелёная карета, romanized: Zelyonaya kareta) is a 2015 Russian drama film directed by Oleg Asadulin. Won the NETPAC Award at the 4th Hanoi International Film Festival.

== Plot ==
The film tells about a successful director whose life collapses in an instant.

== Cast ==
- Andrey Merzlikin as Vadim Rayevsky
- Viktoriya Isakova as Vera Raevskaya, Vadim's wife
- Anna Chipovskaya as Marina
- Yan Tsapnik as senior investigator
- Andrey Leonov as Begemot
- Vladimir Menshov as professor Oleg Valentinovich Dobrolyubov
- Aleksandr Michkov as Artyom
- Valentina Ananina as aunt Valya
- Sergey Yushkevich as Pasha
- Dmitriy Astrakhan as Mikhail Ivanovich Bazhov
- Igor Vernik as host of the ceremony
- Elena Podkaminskaya as host of the ceremony

== Critical perception ==
Film.ru reviewer Yevgeny Ukhov notes that "this is a strong drama played out by brilliant actors" and evaluates Asadulin's film 8 out of 10.
