= Malaria (2016 film) =

- Directed by: Parviz Shahbazi
- Written by: Parviz Shahbazi
- Produced by: Masoud Radaei
- Starring: Saed Soheili Saghar Ghanaat
- Cinematography: Hooman Behmanesh
- Edited by: Parviz Shahbazi
- Music by: Siavash Asadi; Azarakhsh Farahani
- Release date: February 1, 2016 (Fajr Film Festival)
- Running time: 86 minutes
- Country: Iran
- Language: Persian

Malaria (Persian: مالاریا) is a 2016 Iranian drama film written and directed by Parviz Shahbazi. It had its world premiere in the Horizons section at the 73rd edition of the Venice Film Festival. The film later won the Grand Prix at the 2016 Warsaw International Film Festival.

Parviz Shahbazi also director won the best director award at the Dhaka International Film Festival.

== Cast ==
- Saed Soheili as Morteza (Murry)
- Saghar Ghanaat as Hanna
- Azarakhsh Farahani as Azarakhsh (Azi)
- Azade Namdari as Samira
