= Javad Ezzati =

Iranian actor and director (born 1982)

- جواد عزتی
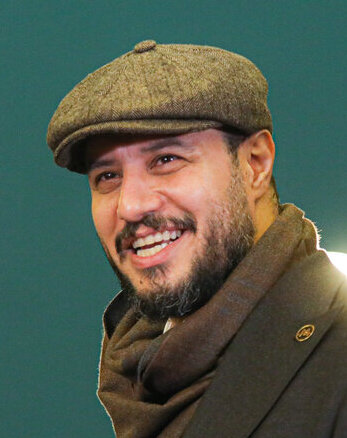
- Ezzati in 2024
- Born: Mohammad Javad Ezzati; January 10, 1982 (age 44); Tehran, Iran
- Education: Soore University
- Occupations: Actor; director
- Years active: 1993–present
- Spouse: Mahlagha Bagheri (m. 2006)

Mohammad Javad Ezzati (Persian: محمد جواد عزتی; born January 10, 1982) is an Iranian actor and director. He has received critical acclaim for his work in a wide range of genres. As of 2019, Ezzati's starring films have grossed 150 billion toman and accumulated more than 18 million tickets, making him the highest-grossing actor in Iran. He has received various accolades, including a Crystal Simorgh, two Hafez Awards, an Iran's Film Critics and Writers Association Award, and an Urban International Film Festival Award.

== Career ==
Ezzati began his acting career at the age of 15 with working in theatre. He made his Television debut in Night Tales (2002), Mozaffar's Garden (2006), Man of Many Faces (2008), 50-50 of a Shop (2011) and gained recognition for his role as Latif in Great Troubles (2014–2015) for which he received his first Hafez Awards nomination.

He also made his film debut with a small role in Homayoon Asadian's Gold and Copper (2010).

He received his second Hafez Awards nomination for playing a young man who has written a book about young peoples sexual needs which no one accepts to publish, in In Due Course (2015).

After playing many comedic roles, he played his first dramatic role in the 2017 two-part film series Midday Adventures, he received critical acclaim and two Fajr Film Festival nominations and won a Hafez Awards for playing a member from Iranian Revolutionary Intelligence Service who are trying to arrest militant members and commanders of a terrorist group in the two-part drama thriller and political Midday Adventures (2017) / Midday Adventures: Trace of Blood (2019).

He gained attention and received a Hafez Awards nomination for playing in the romantic drama Lottery (2018) with less than 15-ish minutes of screen time.

In 2019, he starred in the comedy box office hit Centipede. the film broke several box office records and In the fifth week of its theatrical run, became the highest-grossing film in Iran at that time.

The film has become a major box office success in Iran, grossing 30 billion toman in less than 2 months and surpassing 4 million ticket sales in its first 45 days.

In 2020, he played five different dramatic roles including playing in Sun Children that was selected as the Iranian entry for the Best International Feature Film at the 93rd Academy Awards, making the shortlist of fifteen films.

In Atabai (2020) he played Yahya, a man who speak Turkish, It earned Ezzati his third Fajr Film Festival nomination and his acting was praised by the critics.

In Drown (2020), he played the leading role. The film and actors received generally positive reviews from critics but he was snubbed by the 38th Fajr Film Festival. However, the film scored the most nominations—12—and has received the most wins–5–.

The film premiered on 2020 June 24 and began streaming on Namava & Filimo on 2021 March 31. It became the most watched film on these platforms (online releases).

Despite the film received mixed reviews, Ezzati's acting in Amphibious (2020) was met critical acclaim. Massoud Farasati said, "The relationship between Ezzati and Elham Akhavan reminds me of Akira Kurosawa's Red Beard (1965)."

On April 13, 2021, it was announced that Javad Ezzati will star in the neo-noir mystery drama series Mortal Wound. The series is based on The Tragedy of Macbeth by William Shakespeare.

The first episode was released on June 4, 2021. the series recorded the highest average rating of 99% for a drama on Filimo with its first three episodes, it received mostly positive reviews, with overall praise for Ezzati's performance. The series became the most-watched home video series in Iran.

Him and Mohammad Hossein Mahdavian the director of the series, are frequent collaborators in Iran cinema. they have collaborated five times in Midday Adventures (2017), Lottery (2018), Midday Adventures: Trace of Blood (2019), Mortal Wound (2021) and The Loser Man (2022).

Ezzati has appeared as the main character in 2025 television serie The Savage (Persian: وحشی, romanized: Vahshi) which is created, written and directed by Houman Seyyedi.

== Filmography ==
=== Film ===
Year	Title	Role	Director	Notes	Ref(s)
2010	Gold and Copper	Reza's friend	Homayoun As'adian		
2011	Africa	Shahram	Houman Seyyedi		
2011	The Playfellow		Gholam Reza Ramezani		
2012	Everything Is Calm		Mostafa Mansouryar		
2012	Displace	Ehsan	Ali Tavakolnia		
2014	Everything for Sale	Reza	Amir Thaghfi		
2014	Track 143	Shahrokh	Narges Abyar		
2014	Kalashnikov	Zeynal's son	Saeed Soheili		
2014	Angels Descend Together	Ahmad	Hamed Mohammadi		
2014	That Sad Song		Arash Sanjabi		
2015	Hail and Sun	Nasser	Reza Karimi		
2015	Paradise	Pezhman	Ali Atshani		
2015	In Due Course	Meysam	Vahid Amirkhani		
2015	Reversed Seven	Shahruz	Mehdi Khosravi		
2016	Spare	Saeed	Borzou Niknejad		
2017	Midday Adventures	Sadegh	Mohammad Hossein Mahdavian		
2017	Oxidan	Aslan	Hamed Mohammadi		
2017	Wing Mirror	Morteza	Manouchehr Hadi		
2018	Lottery	Nima	Mohammad Hossein Mahdavian		
2018	The Lost Strait	Majid	Bahram Tavakoli		
2018	Rabbit	Behnoud	Mani Baghbani		
2018	Centipede	Mansoor	Abolhassan Davoudi		
2019	Alive	Yaser	Hossein Amiri Doomari, Pedram Pouramiri		
2019	Midday Adventures: Trace of Blood	Sadegh	Mohammad Hossein Mahdavian		
2019	Four Fingers	Nader Istadeh	Hamed Mohammadi		
2019	We Are All Together	Majid	Kamal Tabrizi		
2019	Zero Floor	Saeed	Ebrahim Ebrahimian		
2019	Dance with Me	Ehsan	Soroush Sehhat		
2020	Bone Marrow	Majid Bodaghi	Hamid Reza Ghorbani		
2020	Amphibious	Atta	Borzou Niknejad		
2020	Drown	Hojat	Mohammad Kart		
2020	Atabai	Yahya	Niki Karimi		
2020	Sun Children	School Vice Principal	Majid Majidi		
2020	After the Incident		Pouria Heidary Oureh		
2022	The Loser Man	Ahmad Khosravi	Mohammad Hossein Mahdavian		
2023	Leather Jacket Man	Issa Farahmand	Hossein Mirzamohammadi		
2024	Alligator Blood	Houman	Javad Ezzati	Directorial feature film debut	

=== Web ===
Year	Title	Role	Director	Platform	Notes
2010–2012	Bitter Coffee	Baba Eti	Mehran Modiri	Filimo	Supporting role
2013	Mozaffar's Treasure	Habib	Mehran Modiri	Filimo	Supporting role
2021	Mutual Friendship	Himself	Shahab Hosseini	Namava	Talk show; 1 episode
2021–2025	Mortal Wound	Malek Maleki	Mohammad Hossein Mahdavian	Filimo	Main role; 48 episodes
2025–2026	The Savage	Davood Ashraf	Houman Seyyedi	Filmnet	Main role

=== Television ===
Year	Title	Role	Director	Notes	Network
2002	Night Tales		Saeed Aghakhani	TV series	
2004	I'm a Tenant	Food Delivery	Parisa Bakhtavar	TV series	IRIB TV3
2004	Fasten Your Seatbelts	Captain's Assistant	Mehdi Mazloumi	TV series	IRIB TV3
2006–2007	Mozaffar's Garden	Houman	Mehran Modiri	TV series	IRIB TV3
2008	Residential Camp	Siamak Karimi	Javad Razavian	TV series	IRIB TV5
2008	Man of Many Faces	Dr. Tabibian's Father	Mehran Modiri	TV series	IRIB TV3
2008	Sweet Dreams		Seyyed Vahid Hosseini	TV series	IRIB TV1
2008	Like Nobody		Abdolhassan Barzideh	TV series	IRIB TV2
2009	Sweet Salty		Javad Ardakani	TV film	
2009	Will Happen		Behrouz Shoeibi	TV film	
2009	Please Don't Turn Around		Mehdi Mazloumi	TV series	IRIB TV5
2009	Last-born		Ishmael Mehdipour	TV film	
2009	Haft-seen		Hossein Tabrizi	TV film	
2010	Privacy Policy	Naser	Siroos Moghaddam	TV series	IRIB TV1
2010	Chavosh Bahar		Afshin Arbabi	TV series	
2010	Yalda's Deadlock		Abbas Ranjbar	TV film	Sahar TV
2010	Between Staying and Leaving		Behrouz Shoeibi	TV film	IRIB TV2
2011	50-50 of a Shop	Masoud Eshghi	Shahed Ahmadlo	TV series	IRIB TV5
2011	White As a Star		Javad Roustaee	TV film	
2012	Hand Over Hand	Saeed	Mohsen Yousefi	TV series	IRIB TV3
2012	Bite		Majid Salehi	TV film	IRIB TV1
2012	It's Time to Grow Up		Zharzh Hashemzadeh	TV film	IRIB TV3
2012	Wet Letters		Marjan Ashrafizadeh	TV film	
2013	Haft-seen		Yadollah Samadi	TV series	IRIB TV5
2013	Chimney	Haji Ansari	Mohammad Hossein Latifi	TV series	IRIB TV1
2014	Behind Closed Doors		Masoud Rashidi	TV film	
2014–2015	Great Troubles	Latif Hamkar	Borzou Niknejad	TV series	IRIB TV3
2015	Khandevaneh	Himself	Rambod Javan	TV program	IRIB Nasim
2016	Standardized Patient	Omid	Saeed Aghakhani	TV series	IRIB TV1
2016	Seven	Himself	Mojtaba Amini	TV program	IRIB TV3
2017	Get Together	Himself	Mehran Modiri	TV program	IRIB Nasim
2023–2024	Homeland	Ghasem	Kamal Tabrizi	TV series	IRIB TV3

== Theatre ==
Year	Title	Playwright	Director	Stage
2003	The Crucible	Arthur Miller	Mahlagha Bagheri	
2006	Julius Caesar	William Shakespeare	Masoud Delkhah	Molavi Hall
2010–2011	The Ruthless Killer Hasse Karlsson	Henning Mankell	Masoud Rayegan	Iranshahr Theater
2013	Rumors	Neil Simon	Rahman Seyfi Azad	Iranshahr Theater
2014	The Sunshine Boys	Neil Simon	Siamak Safari	City Theater of Tehran, Niavaran Cultural Center
2017–2018	The Prisoner of Second Avenue	Neil Simon	Mahlagha Bagheri	Iranshahr Theater
2022	300		Amir Jadidi	Sa'dabad Complex

== Awards and nominations ==
Name of the award ceremony, year presented, category, nominee of the award, and the result of the nomination
Award	Year	Category	Nominated Work	Result	Ref(s)
Asia Rainbow TV Awards	2016	Best Actor in Comedy	Spare	Nominated	
Fajr Film Festival	2017	Best Actor in a Supporting Role	Midday Adventures	Nominated	
Fajr Film Festival	2019	Best Actor in a Supporting Role	Midday Adventures: Trace of Blood	Nominated	
Fajr Film Festival	2020	Best Actor in a Supporting Role	Atabai	Nominated	
Fajr Film Festival	2023	Best Actor in a Leading Role	Leather Jacket Man	Nominated	
Fajr Film Festival	2024	Best Actor in a Leading Role	Alligator Blood	Nominated	
Fajr Film Festival	2024	Best Director	Alligator Blood	Nominated	
Fajr Film Festival	2024	Best First Director	Alligator Blood	Won	
Hafez Awards	2015	Best Actor – Television Series Comedy	Great Troubles	Nominated	
Hafez Awards	2016	Best Actor – Motion Picture	In Due Course	Nominated	
Hafez Awards	2017	Best Actor – Motion Picture	Midday Adventures	Won	
Hafez Awards	2018	Best Actor – Motion Picture	Lottery	Nominated	
Hafez Awards	2019	Best Actor – Motion Picture	Centipede	Nominated	
Hafez Awards	2020	Best Actor – Motion Picture	Midday Adventures: Trace of Blood	Nominated	
Hafez Awards	2021	Best Actor – Television Series Drama	Mortal Wound	Nominated	
Hafez Awards	2021	Best Actor – Motion Picture	Drown	Nominated	
Hafez Awards	2021	Jury Prize	Drown and Mortal Wound	Won	
Hafez Awards	2023	Best Actor – Motion Picture	Atabai	Nominated	
Hafez Awards	2024	Best Actor – Television Series Drama	Mortal Wound: Revenge	Nominated	
Hafez Awards	2024	Best Director – Motion Picture	Alligator Blood	Nominated	
Hafez Awards	2024	Individual Achievement	Mortal Wound: Revenge, Alligator Blood	Won	
Iran Cinema Celebration	2017	Best Actor in a Supporting Role	Midday Adventures	Nominated	
Iran's Film Critics and Writers Association	2018	Best Actor in a Leading Role	The Lost Strait	Nominated	
Iran's Film Critics and Writers Association	2020	Best Actor in a Supporting Role	Midday Adventures: Trace of Blood	Nominated	
Iran's Film Critics and Writers Association	2022	Best Actor in a Leading Role	Drown	Nominated	
Iran's Film Critics and Writers Association	2022	Best Actor in a Supporting Role	Atabai	Won	
Iranian Film Festival Australia	2022	Best Actor	Sun Children	Won	
Resistance International Film Festival	2018	Best Actor	The Lost Strait	Nominated	
Urban International Film Festival	2019	Best Actor	Midday Adventures: Trace of Blood	Nominated	
Urban International Film Festival	2022	Best Actor	The Loser Man	Won	
