= Lottery (2018 film) =

- Film poster
- Directed by: Mohammad Hossein Mahdavian
- Screenplay by: Mohammad Hossein Mahdavian; Ebrahim Amini
- Produced by: Seyyed Mahmoud Razavi
- Starring: Saed Soheili; Hadi Hejazifar; Hamid Farrokhnezhad; Ziba Karamali; Javad Ezzati
- Cinematography: Hadi Behrooz
- Edited by: Hossein Jamshid Gohari; Sajad Pahlavan Zadeh
- Music by: Habib Khazaeifar; Roozbeh Bemani
- Release dates: 1 February 2018 (FIFF); 14 March 2018 (Iran)
- Running time: 114 minutes
- Country: Iran
- Languages: Persian; Arabic; English
- Box office: 14.8 billion toman (Iran)

Lottery (Persian: لاتاری) is a 2018 Iranian romance thriller drama film directed by Mohammad Hossein Mahdavian who also wrote it in collaboration with Ebrahim Amini. The film screened for the first time at the 36th Fajr Film Festival.

== Plot ==
Amir Ali and Nooshin are two youngsters who are in love and want to get married. Their families oppose their plan. The two youngsters have only one dream, to win the Lottery and get a green card and move to the United States.

== Cast ==
- Saed Soheili as Amir Ali
- Hadi Hejazifar as Mousa
- Hamid Farrokhnezhad as Morteza
- Ziba Karamali as Nooshin
- Javad Ezzati as Nima
- Nader Soleimani as Naeem
- Alireza Ostadi as Reza Beigi
- Mahdi Zaminpardaz as Sami
- Behzad Foroutan as Saman
- Hamidreza Hedayati as Amir Ali's Father
- Mahsa Bagheri as Nasrin
- Amir Hossein Hashemi as Sasan
- Gholamreza Shahbazi as The Prosecutor

== Reception ==
=== Accolades ===
Year	Award	Category	Recipient	Result
2018	Fajr Film Festival	Best Visual Effects	Sina Ghavidel	Nominated
2018	Hafez Awards	Special Jury Prize	Mohammad Hossein Mahdavian	Won
2018	Hafez Awards	Best Film	Lottery	Nominated
2018	Hafez Awards	Best Director	Mohammad Hossein Mahdavian	Nominated
2018	Hafez Awards	Best Actor (Film)	Saed Soheili	Nominated
2018	Hafez Awards	Best Actor (Film)	Hadi Hejazifar	Won
2018	Hafez Awards	Best Actor (Film)	Javad Ezzati	Nominated
2018	Hafez Awards	Best Editor	Hossein Jamshid Gohari & Sajad Pahlavan Zadeh	Won
2018	Hafez Awards	Best Original Score	Habib Khazaeifar	Nominated
2018	Hafez Awards	Best Original Song	"Where Should I Go" by Roozbeh Bemani	Nominated
2018	Iran's Film Critics and Writers Association	Best Actor in a Supporting Role	Hadi Hejazifar	Nominated
