= Bizhan Emkanian =

Iranian actor

Bijan Emkanian
- بیژن امکانیان
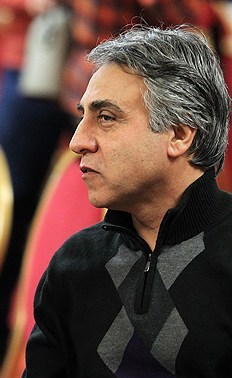
- Born: 18 August 1953 (age 72); Abadan, Iran
- Occupation: Actor
- Years active: 1980–present

Bijan Emkanian (Persian: بیژن امکانیان; born on August 18, 1953, in Abadan, Iran) is an Iranian actor. Besides acting, Bijan Emkanian is a bodybuilder and has mentioned Akbar Khazaei, who is an international professional bodybuilding coach, as his bodybuilding coach.

== Selected filmography ==
- Bijan and Dream and Shoes (Bijan o Khial o Kafsh), Short Film, 1969
- Liegemen, 1981
- The Chrysanthemums, 1984
- Burning spruces, 1989
- Longing for Marriage, 1990
- Reign of Love (TV series), 2000
- Intersection, 2005
- Come at sunset, 2004
- Underwater, 2009
- Ambush, 2013
- Crazy face, 2014
- Nahid, 2015
- Bachelors (serises), 2016 - 2018
