= Hadi Moghadamdoost =

Iranian director and screenwriter (born 1971)

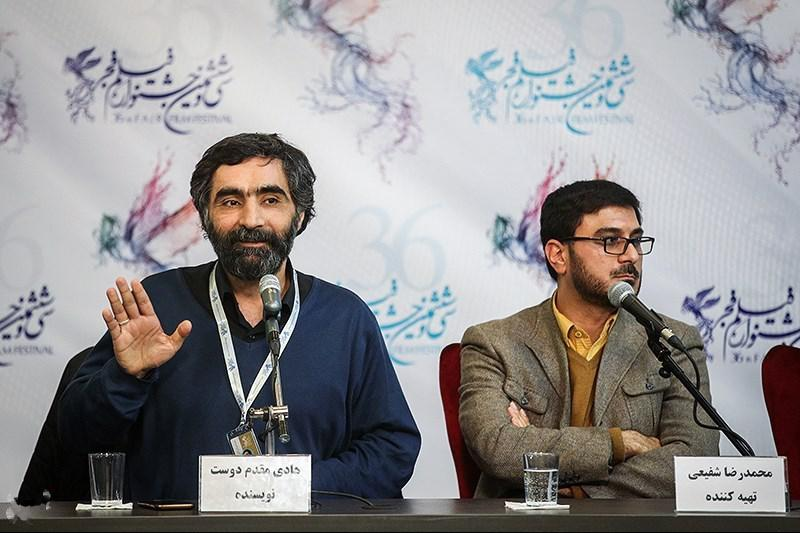
Hadi Moghadamdoost left

Hadi Moghadamdoost (born 1971) is an Iranian director and screenwriter. He is best known for his screenplay for the 2018 film Sholevar, for which he received several industry nominations. He has directed several movies:

- 2020 - Soldier (TV series)
- 2016 - Never
- 2013 - The Sealed Secret
- 2011 - The Meeting
- 2011 - Adhesive Plaster
- 2016 - Heihat
