= The Loser Man =

2022 film

- Film poster
- Directed by: Mohammad Hossein Mahdavian
- Written by: Mohammad Hossein Mahdavian; Hossein Hassani; Ebrahim Amini
- Produced by: Amir Banan; Kamran Hejazi
- Starring: Javad Ezzati; Rana Azadivar; Babak Karimi; Anahita Dargahi
- Cinematography: Hadi Behrouz
- Edited by: Sajad Pahlavanzadeh
- Music by: Habib Khazaeifar
- Distributed by: Shayesteh Film
- Release dates: February 1, 2022 (FIFF); March 9, 2022 (Iran)
- Country: Iran
- Language: Persian
- Box office: 6.23 billion toman

The Loser Man (Persian: مرد بازنده, romanized: Mard-e Bāzandeh) is a 2022 Iranian drama film directed by Mohammad Hossein Mahdavian and written by Mahdavian, Ebrahim Amini and Hossein Hassani. The film screened for the first time at the 40th Fajr Film Festival and earned 2 nominations.

== Premise ==
Ahmad Khosravi (Javad Ezzati), in the midst of his busy personal life, becomes responsible for handling mysterious cases. A case whose discovery process confuses Ahmed with his doubts and worries and affects his life.

== Cast ==
- Javad Ezzati as Ahmad Khosravi
- Rana Azadivar as Somayeh
- Babak Karimi as Rasul
- Anahita Dargahi as Bahar
- Mahdi Zaminpardaz as Hessam
- Majid Norouzi as Ardalan
- Amir Hossein Hashemi as Raefipour
- Amir Dezhakam as Azimi
- Sajjad Babaei as Sina
- Hojjat Hassanpour as Abozar
- Manouchehr Alipour as Shahab's Uncle
- Shabnam Ghorbani as Marzieh
- Venus Kanly as Sara
- Milad Shah Hosseini
- Melika Pazouki as Mahtab

== Reception ==
=== Accolades ===
Year	Award	Category	Recipient	Result	Ref.
2022	Fajr Film Festival	Best Visual Effects	Amin Pahlavanzadeh	Nominated	
2022	Fajr Film Festival	Best Original Score	Habib Khazaeifar	Nominated	
