= Rouhollah Hejazi =

Iranian film director

- روح‌الله حجازی
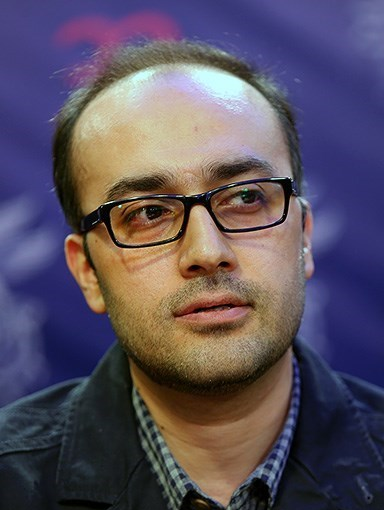
- Hejazi at the 2014 Fajr International Film Festival
- Born: April 1, 1979 (age 47); Abadan, Iran
- Occupations: Film director; screenwriter; producer
- Years active: 2007–present

Rouhollah Hejazi (Persian: روح‌الله حجازی, born April 1, 1986) is an Iranian film director, screenwriter and producer.

== Filmography ==
=== Film ===
Year	Title	Director	Writer	Producer	Notes
2008	Among the Clouds	Yes	No	No	screened at the 26th fajr film festival
2012	The Private Life of Mr. & Mrs. M	Yes	No	No	
2014	The Wedlock	Yes	No	No	
2015	Death of the Fish	Yes	Yes	Yes	screened at the 33rd fajr film festival
2016	Never	Yes	Yes	No	
2016	Heihat				
2018	The Dark Room	Yes	Yes	Yes	screened at the 36th fajr film festival
2021	Bright House	Yes	Yes	Yes	screened at the 39th fajr film festival

=== Web ===
Year	Title	Director	Writer	Producer	Platform
2022	Lily's Turn	Yes	Yes	Yes	Namava
