= Farzad Motamen =

Iranian film director

Farzad Motamen فرزاد مؤتمن
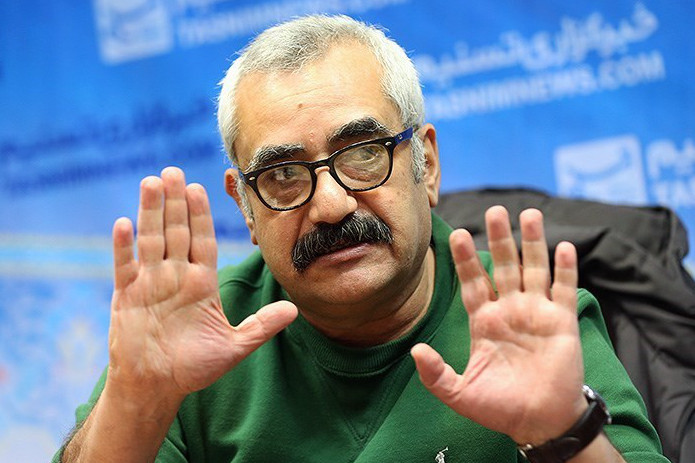
- Born: August 9, 1957 (age 69); Tehran, Iran
- Occupation: Film Director

Farzad Motamen (Persian: فرزاد مؤتمن; born 9 August 1957), is an Iranian film director.

== Early life and background ==
Farzad Mo'temman spent his childhood and teenage in south of Iran and, after graduating from high school, went to the United States to study. In 1979, he left school in the field of cinema and returned to Iran. After that, Motemn was active in photography, filming, and documenting. He has also been teaching at Sooreh University and Pars University since 1999 besides making films.

== Filmography ==
Year	Film	Credited as			Notes
Year	Film	Director	Producer	Writer	Notes
2019	Eyes And Ears Closed	Yes	No	No	
2018	All Through The Night	Yes	No	Yes	
2015	When Was The Last Time You Saw Sahar?	Yes	Yes	No	
2014	The Long Farewell	Yes	Yes	No	Co-producer: Ali Hazrati
2012	Light and Shadow	Yes	No	No	
2010	Poopak and Mash Mashalla	Yes	No	No	
2009	The Wake	Yes	No	No	
2009	The Voices	Yes	No	No	
2007	The Music Box	Yes	No	No	
2003	The Blackmailer	Yes	No	No	
2002	The White Nights	Yes	No	No	
2002	Seven Acts	Yes	No	No	
