= Abbas Ranjbar =

Iranian film composer and director

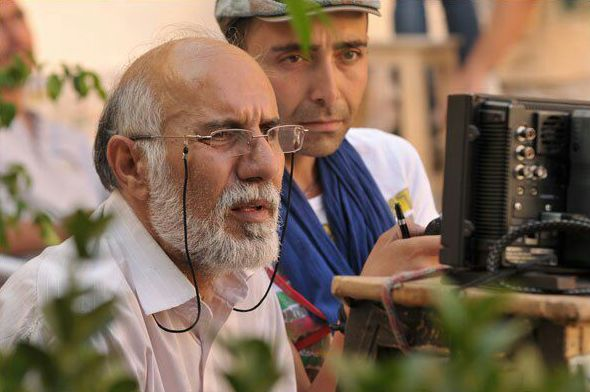
- Born: October 23, 1961 (age 65); Tehran, Iran
- Known for: Film director, Film producing, photography
- Children: 2
- Awards: Best director award in the 2nd Fadjr international theater festival Best director award in the 5th Fadjr international theater festival
- Scientific career
- Fields: Cinema
- Workplaces: IRIB, Sadaf Film, Faradid Group

Abbas Ranjbar is a contemporary film composer, director and producer of several movies and shows for private companies and IRIB organization in Iran.

== Biography ==
Abbas Ranjbar was born in 1960 in Tehran, Iran. He received his bachelor's degree in Visual Arts from the University of Tehran in 1982, his master's degree in cultural management from the Allameh Tabataba'i University in 1985. He serves as a faculty member of Iran's Academic Center for Education, Culture and Research (Persian: جهاد دانشگاهی), the director of Sadaf Film, a leading private film making company and a member of the visual effects institute, Faradid Group. Ranjbar has a daughter and a son, who are both married.

== Career history ==
- Head of Artwork office of Iran's Academic Center for Education, Culture and Research (Persian: جهاد دانشگاهی) at Sharif University of Technology, 1988-1991.
- Head of department of Television at the central office of Iran's Academic Center for Education, Culture and Research (Persian: جهاد دانشگاهی), 1991-1996.
- Founder and Dean of the academic institute Rasaam Higher Education Institute (Persian: رسام هنر), 1995-2000.
- Administrative Assistant of cultural section in Tehran municipality, 1998-2000.
- Designer and consultant for cultural houses for towns in Tehran, 1999-2002.

== Awards and honors ==
Abbas Ranjbar has participated in numerous film and theater festivals as a jury member. Also his works have been nominated in several festivals. Hereunder are some representatives:

- Golden Statuette Award as the best director for the theater play Purple Cloak (Persian: خرقه ارغوانی) in the 2nd Fadjr international theater festival
- Golden Statuette Award for the best play and the best director for the theater play Gray bundles (Persian: خوشه های خاکستری) in the 5th Fadjr international theater festival
- A plaque for the film Tiam (Persian: تیام) in short films festival, Isfahan, 2007.
