= Crystal Simorgh for Audience Choice of Best Film =

Category of film award

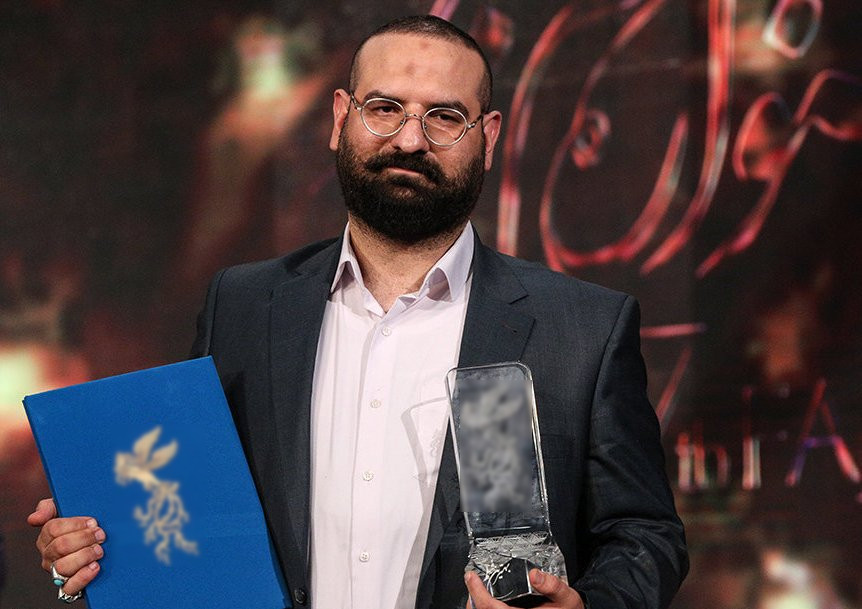
- Current recipient: Mohammadhossein Ghasemi
- Country: Iran
- Presented by: Fajr International Film Festival
- First award: 1998
- Currently held by: Mohammadhossein Ghasemi for Piebald (2021)

Highlights
- Most wins: Jamal Sadatian (4 times)
- Website: fajrfilmfestival.com

Crystal Simorgh for Audience Choice of Best Film (Persian: سیمرغ بلورین بهترین فیلم از نگاه تماشاگران) is an award presented annually by the Fajr International Film Festival held in Iran.

== Winners ==
Year	Film	Producer(s)	Ref.(s)
1998 16	The Glass Agency	Varahonar and Farabi Cinema Foundation	
1999 17	The Color of Paradise	Varahonar	
2000 18	The Bride of Fire	Ghasem Gholipour	
2000 18	Born Under Libra	Tamasha Cultural Institute and Soureh Cinema Development Organization	
2001 19	Killing Mad Dogs	Bahram Beyzai	
2002 20	Low Heights	Manouchehr Mohammadi	
2003 21	The Wind Carpet	Alireza Shoja Nouri	
2004 22	The Lizard	Manouchehr Mohammadi	
2005 23	The Willow Tree	Majid Majidi	
2006 24	Fireworks Wednesday	Jamal Sadatian	
2007 25	Deportees	Habibollah Kasehsaz	
2007 25	Santouri	Dariush Mehrjui	
2008 26	There's Always A Woman in Between	Mohsen Ali-Akbari	
2009 27	Penniless	Mostafa Shayesteh	
2009 27	About Elly	Asghar Farhadi	
2010 28	In Amethyst Color	Jamal Sadatian	
2011 29	A Separation	Asghar Farhadi	
2012 30	The Snow on the Pines	Jamal Sadatian	
2013 31	The Painting Pool	Manouchehr Mohammadi	
2013 31	Hush! Girls Don't Scream	Pouran Derakhshandeh	
2014 32	Track 143	Mohammad-Hossein Ghasemi and Abouzar Pourmohammadi	
2014 32	Special Line	Mansour Lashkari Quchani	
2015 33	Crazy Rook	Bita Mansouri	
2016 34	Life and A Day	Saeid Malekan	
2017 35	Midday Adventures	Mahmoud Razavi	
2018 36	Sheeple	Saeed Sa'di	
2019 37	Just 6.5	Jamal Sadatian	
2020 38	Butterfly Stroke	Rasul Sadr Ameli	
2021 39	Piebald	Mohammadhossein Ghasemi	
2022 40	No award given that year		
2023 41	No award given that year		
2024 42	No award given that year		
