= Dustin Feneley =

New Zealand film director and screenwriter

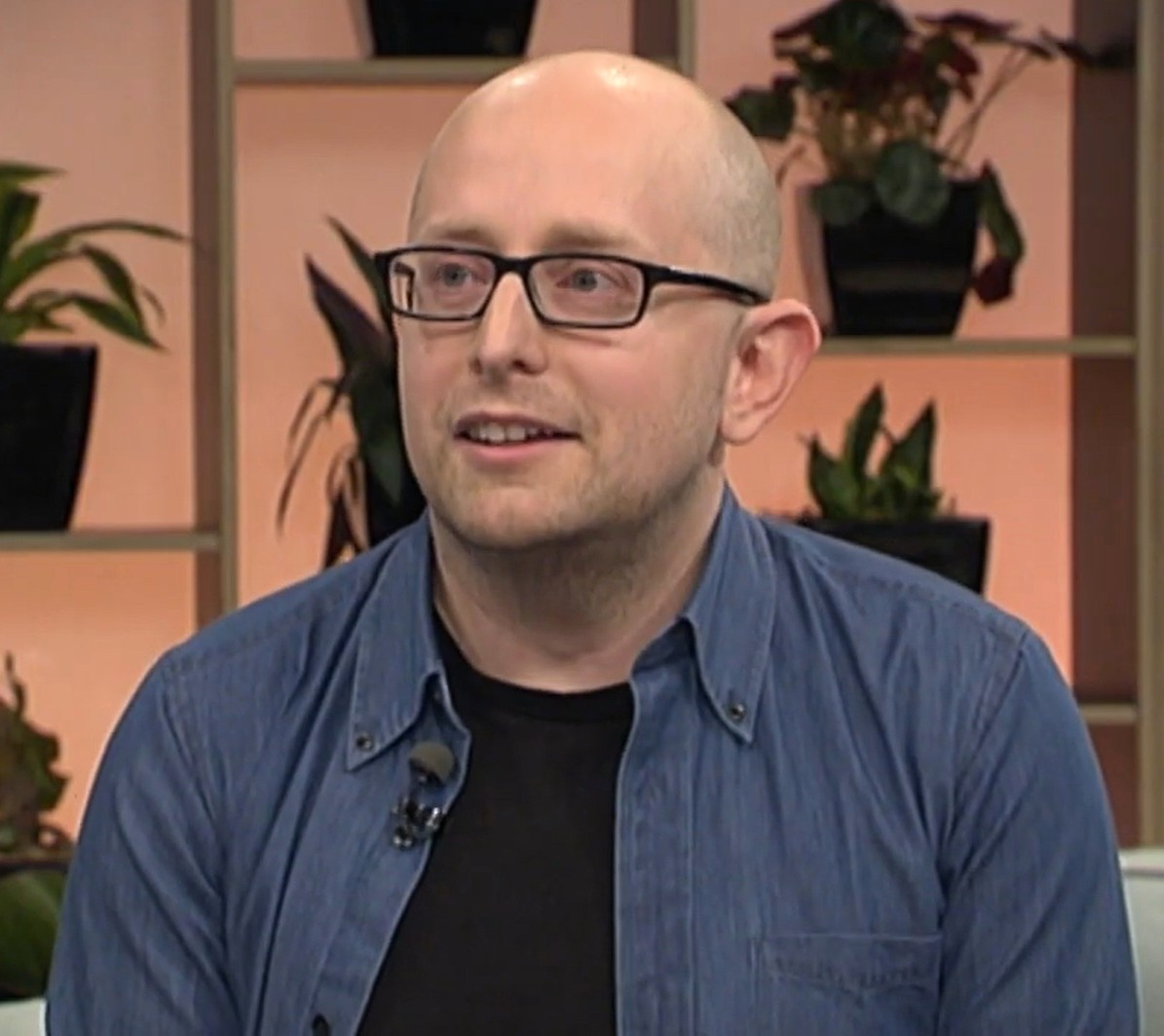
Feneley in 2018

Dustin Feneley (born 15 April 1982) is a film director and screenwriter.

Feneley graduated from the Victorian College of the Arts Film School at the University of Melbourne.

Feneley wrote and directed the successful short film, Snow (2006), which screened as an Official Selection at the 2006 Cannes Film Festival. In 2007, he was awarded the Qantas Spirit of Youth Award for Moving Image. In 2011, Feneley received the Filmmaker Grand Prix at the Sapporo International Short Film Festival for his body of work in short films.

Feneley's films include the atmospheric portrait of a travelling salesman, Hawker (2008), and the intimate portrayal of a young disabled man's first romantic encounter, Eskimo Kiss (2009). He has written a series of articles for the magazine Screen Education in which he explored the art and process of narrative short filmmaking.

His debut feature film, Stray (2018), starring Kieran Charnock and Arta Dobroshi, was well reviewed by critics, with one declaring “You can put Stray up with the very best films ever made in New Zealand” and another calling it a “modern classic”.

Stray holds the record for the highest amount ever raised via crowdfunding for a New Zealand film.
