= Mohammad Hossein Mahdavian =

Iranian film director

- محمدحسین مهدویان
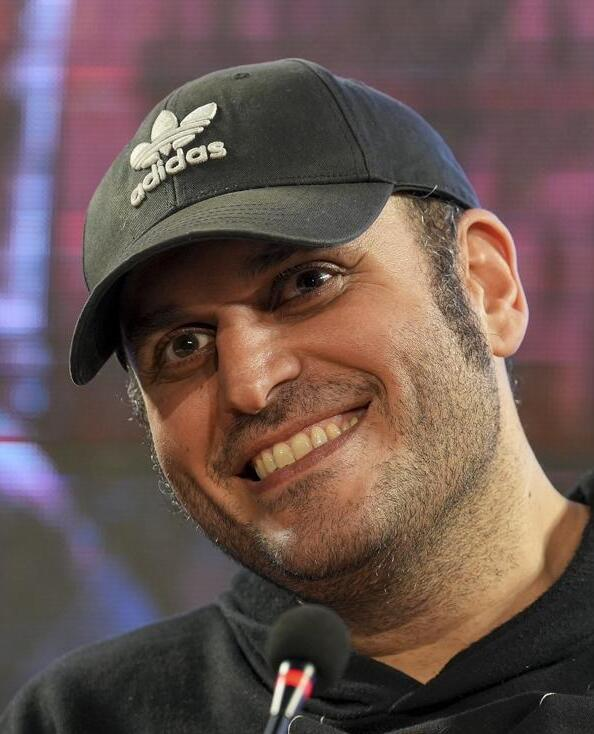
- Mahdavian at the 2026 Fajr Film Festival
- Born: 13 May 1981 (age 45); Babol, Iran
- Education: Soore University
- Occupations: Film Director; Screenwriter
- Years active: 2012–present
- Spouse: Mahbobe Golsorkhtabar
- Children: 2

Mohammad Hossein Mahdavian (Persian: محمدحسین مهدویان; born 13 May 1981) is an Iranian film director and screenwriter. He's best known for his films Standing in the Dust (2016), Midday Adventures (2017), Lottery (2018), Walnut Tree (2020) and Mortal Wound (2021).

He won both Best Film and Audience Choice of Best Film for making the film Midday Adventures, making it one of only five films in the history of cinema of Iran to win the latter. (The other four are The Glass Agency, Low Heights, In Amethyst Color and Crazy Rook.)

== Career ==
He graduated from Soore University with a Bachelor of Film and Television in Directing and a master's degree in production from the Iran Broadcasting University.

Mahdavian received critical acclaim for making the film Standing in the Dust, he won the Crystal Simorgh for Best Film and received a nomination for Crystal Simorgh for Best Director in 2016 at the 34th Fajr Film Festival.

in 2017 he won the Crystal Simorgh for Best Film and the Crystal Simorgh for Audience Choice of Best Film for Midday Adventures. When he received this award (Crystal Simorgh for Audience Choice of Best Film), he called it the most important award of the festival.

He won the Crystal Simorgh for Best Director at the 38th Fajr Film Festival for making the film Walnut Tree. This film is about war it is about the ugliness of war the consequences of unconvee weapons.

== Early life ==
Mohammad Hossein Mahdovian was fascinated by the moving picture since his childhood. He was one of those children who, instead of playing in the street, always sat in front of the TV and watched even the most outlandish programs. He decided to enter the cinema for the first time when he was ten years old, and of course, as a child, he wanted to become an actor.

Cinema had captured his heart, and besides watching television constantly, at the age of thirteen, Mahdovian recorded a picture for the first time with his uncle's home camera and gave his cousins a mise-en-scène in front of the camera. In this regard, he wrote his first screenplay in high school.

Unlike his father, his uncle was interested in cinema, and his small age difference with Mahdovian made cinema more serious for Mohammad Hossein. Uncle and niece used to go to all their cinemas together in those days. He not only took Mahdovian to the cinema for the first time, but also gave him the first book of his childhood. "I don't remember anything specific about the first movies I saw in the cinema, but I'm sure that things from those years have influenced me, and sometimes the images that remain in my mind, surprise me."

=== History ===
Mahdovian's favorite school subject was history, and according to himself, he used to read newspapers and follow events. His interest in the contemporary history of Iran manifests in his films.

At the same age, he became interested in Jules Verne's books. His favorite movies before high school are lively and action movies with heroes, such as Western movies or "Eagles" and "Afee" among Iranian movies.

But after high school and by getting acquainted with philosophy, his tendency is more towards intellectual cinema. "Arusi Khoban" directed by Mohsen Makhmalbaf and "Hamoun" by Dariush Mehrjoui are popular films of his era: "In those years, I used to watch intellectual films in an extreme way, which usually have a slow rhythm and their main focus is not on the narrative, a kind of intellectual stew in those years I had and I thought that a good film should be very complicated."

== Style ==
One of the main tools used by Mahdavians to represent a documentary is the use of a hand-held camera in filming, which creates the illusion of more reality for the viewer. A technique that is, of course, used in many especially social films of Iranian cinema. But the visual quality and texture of the image that Mahdavian creates is not similar to the scenes on social films.

In the first place, it uses the Negative to add a nostalgic aspect to the films, which is in harmony with the story and the theme of the film. That is, the choice of whether to shoot a negative or digital film is directly related to the story. In "Standing in the Dust" or "Midday Adventures" and "Midday Adventures: Trace of Blood", a 16mm negative camera has been used to bring the film closer to its narrative since the 1960s. Digital cameras have been rebuilt and in "Walnut Tree" in each period of the film, i.e. the 60s, 80s and 90s, in order to remain faithful to the visual index texture in each decade, 16mm, 35mm and digital cameras, respectively, have been used. They have their own visual phase.

In addition, the camera movements are not like other social films, it has sloppiness and pus, which again emphasizes the documentary aspect. Of course, this does not mean that the director's design is not accurate, that exactly all the elements in front of the camera are placed in such a way that they look slutty and "unplaced". In Mahdavian's works, the camera serves to document and bring the viewer closer to the date and time in which the story of the film takes place.

In a conversation about making a film about Iran and Nationalism, Mahdavian said:

My goal has always been to create national empathy, and I feel that the only thing that can save us today is empathy. Not to say that I am a very extremist nationalism. Not like that, but I have a deep patriotism. You can go back and see my films from the beginning until today, my problem is Iran and this issue has never changed.

== Filmography ==
=== Feature films ===
| Year | Title | Director | Screenwriter |
|---|---|---|---|
| 2016 | Standing in the Dust | Yes | Yes |
| 2017 | Midday Adventures | Yes | Yes |
| 2018 | Lottery | Yes | Yes |
| 2019 | Midday Adventures: Trace of Blood | Yes | No |
| 2020 | Walnut Tree | Yes | No |
| 2021 | Shishlik | Yes | No |
| 2022 | The Loser Man | Yes | Yes |

=== Web ===
| Year | Title | Director | Screenwriter | Platform |
|---|---|---|---|---|
| 2021–2025 | Mortal Wound | Yes | Yes | Filimo |

=== Television ===
| Year | Title | Director | Screenwriter | Network |
|---|---|---|---|---|
| 2012 | The Last Days of Winter | Yes | Yes | IRIB TV1 |

=== Documentary ===
- Assassination of the Source
- Wound Bone
- The Great Dictator
- Three Sides of The Battlefield
- Sana
- Short Story of Death In Mid-summer
- Father
- Angel of Death
- Single Bed
- Beam and Hope Collection

== Recurring cast ==
| Actor | The Last Days of Winter | Standing in the Dust | Midday Adventures | Lottery | Midday Adventures: Trace of Blood | Walnut Tree | Shishlik | Mortal Wound | The Loser Man |
|---|---|---|---|---|---|---|---|---|---|
| Javad Ezzati | | | check | check | check | | | check | check |
| Hadi Hejazifar | | check | check | check | check | | | | |
| Amir Hossein Hashemi | | check | check | check | check | check | | check | check |
| Mahdi Zaminpardaz | check | | check | check | check | | | check | check |
| Hossein Mehri | | | check | | check | | | | |
| Mahlagha Bagheri | | | | | | | check | check | |
| Abbas Jamshidi Far | | | | | | | check | check | |
| Rana Azadivar | | | | | | | | check | check |

== Awards and nominations ==
| Year | Award | Category | Nominated work | Result |
|---|---|---|---|---|
| 2016 | Fajr Film Festival | Best Director | Standing in the Dust | Nominated |
| 2016 | Fajr Film Festival | Best Screenplay | Standing in the Dust | Nominated |
| 2017 | Fajr Film Festival | Best Director | Midday Adventures | Nominated |
| 2019 | Fajr Film Festival | Best Director | Midday Adventures: Trace of Blood | Nominated |
| 2020 | Fajr Film Festival | Best Director | Walnut Tree | Won |
| 2018 | Hafez Awards | Best Director – Motion Picture | Midday Adventures | Won |
| 2018 | Hafez Awards | Best Screenplay – Motion Picture | Midday Adventures | Nominated |
| 2019 | Hafez Awards | Best Director – Motion Picture | Lottery | Nominated |
| 2019 | Hafez Awards | Jury Prize | Lottery | Won |
| 2020 | Hafez Awards | Best Director – Motion Picture | Midday Adventures: Trace of Blood | Nominated |
| 2020 | Hafez Awards | Best Screenplay – Motion Picture | Midday Adventures: Trace of Blood | Nominated |
| 2021 | Hafez Awards | Best Director – Television Series | Mortal Wound | Nominated |
| 2021 | Hafez Awards | Best Screenplay – Television Series | Mortal Wound | Won |
| 2021 | Hafez Awards | Best Director – Motion Picture | Walnut Tree | Nominated |

== See also ==
- Cinema of Iran
- Fajr International Film Festival
