= Parviz Shahbazi =

Iranian filmmaker (b. 1962)

- پرویز شهبازی
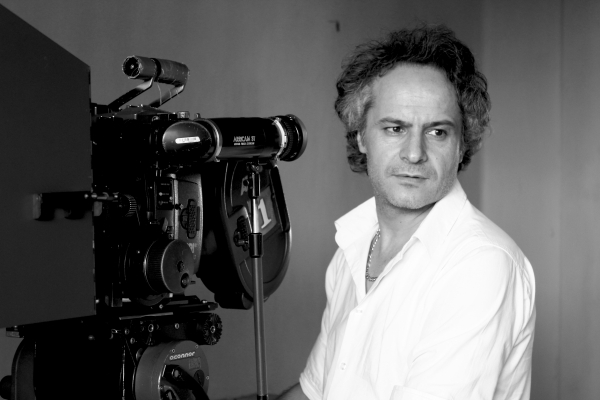
- Born: 29 November 1962 (age 63); Imperial State of Iran
- Education: Iran Broadcasting University
- Occupations: film director, screenwriter, film editor
- Website: www.shahbazifilm.com

Parviz Shahbazi (Persian: پرویز شهبازی; born 29 November 1962) is an Iranian filmmaker.

== Biography ==
Shahbazi is a graduate of filmmaking in Iran. During the early 80's he began writing short stories and directing short films. He edited several films and directed 12 short films before making his first feature film, Traveler from the South, in 1996. 'Talla’ is his latest feature movie.

== Film career ==
His debut feature film, Traveler from the South (1997) as well as his second film, Whispers (2000) went to countless festivals and brought him international recognition, collecting several prizes along the way.

In 2002, his third film, Deep Breath was shown at the Directors' Fortnight at Cannes Film Festival to great success. Among other accolades it won a FIPRESCI award at Pusan and the Jury special award at Turin as well as the Best Film award at the Belgrade Author Festival.

In 2016, Malaria was shown at the 73rd Venice film festival and won the Grand Prix at the Warsaw International Film Festival (2016).

== Filmography ==
Year	Film	Director	Writer	Producer	Assistant Director	Editor
1995	Badkonak-e sefid (The White Balloon)		co writer		Yes	
1997	Mosafer-e jonoub	Yes	Yes			
1999	Yek ruz bishtar (One More Day)					Yes
2000	Najva (Whispers)	Yes	Yes	Yes		
2003	Nafas-e amigh (Deep Breath)	Yes	Yes			Yes
2003	Tehran saat-e 7 sobh (Tehran 7:00 a.m.)					Yes
2006	Be ahestegi... (Gradually...)		Yes			
2009	Ayar 14 (Karat 14)	Yes	Yes	Yes		Yes
2013	Darband (Trapped)	Yes	Yes			Yes
2016	Malaria (Malaria)	Yes	Yes			Yes
2023	Roxana	Yes	Yes			Yes

== Awards ==
Grand Prix at the Warsaw International Film Festival (2016)

Dhaka International Film Festival - Best directing - Darband - 2013 and Malaria - 2017

Fajr Film Festival - Crystal Simorgh - four times for Traveller from the south 1996; 2003 - Nafas-e amigh; Karat 14 - 2008; Darband - 2012

2003 -Torinno film festival - Deep Breath

2003 - PIFF - FIPRESCI Prize Nafas-e amigh (Deep Breath)

2000- Zanzibar film festival - Silver boat - Whispers

1999 Mosafer-e jonub (The Traveller from the South) - Cinequest Film Festival - Best Feature

1998- Annonay film festival France - Best feature film - Traveller from the south

1997 Mosafer-e jonub - TIFF - Gold Award

1996 Mosafer-e jonub - Isfahan International Festival of Films - Golden Butterfly
