= Hanoi International Film Festival =

Film festival in Vietnam

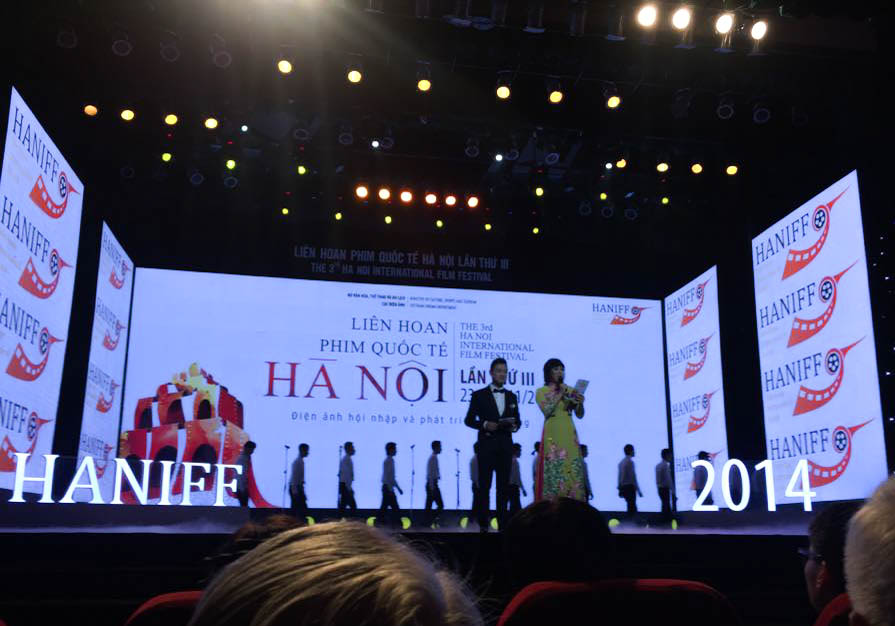
- Opening ceremony in 2014
- Location: Hanoi, Vietnam
- Founded: 16 August 2010; 15 years ago
- Awards: Best Feature Film and others
- Artistic director: Ngô Phương Lan (since 2010)
- No. of films: 147 in 2018
- Website: haniff.vn

The Hanoi International Film Festival (Vietnamese: Liên hoan phim quốc tế Hà Nội), short form as HANIFF is a biennial film festival held in Hanoi, Vietnam around October or November. Founded in 2010 as Vietnam International Film Festival, it is the first international film festival in Vietnam, which introduces new films of all genres, including feature, short, documentary, animated to the audience. Since 2016, it has expanded its entry to all cinemas of countries and regions around the world, instead of just films in the Asia-Pacific region as before.

The festival is jointly organized by Vietnam Cinema Department from the Ministry of Culture, Sports & Tourism and Department of Culture & Sports from Hanoi People's Committee. Mrs. Ngô Phương Lan, incumbent director of Vietnam Cinema Department, has been served as Festival Director since it was founded.

== History ==
=== Founded ===
The Steering Committee of the first Vietnam International Film Festival (short form as VNIFF) was established by the decision of the Ministry of Culture, Sports and Tourism on August 16, 2010, including 7 members. On the morning of September 10, at the Hanoi Opera House, the Cinema Department (Ministry of Culture, Sports and Tourism) held a press conference to introduce the festival.

Taking place from October 17 to 21, 2010, the first Vietnam International Film Festival is one of the activities to celebrate the 1000th anniversary of Thang Long - Hanoi. The film festival is organized by the Department of Cinema, contributing to building the brand of Vietnam Cinema, facilitating exchanges and expanding the market of Vietnamese cinema to the international scope.

In addition, the festival also aims to build a new film festival brand, affirm the position and integration trend of Vietnamese cinema in the international arena, and attract the attention of filmmakers. world image for Vietnamese cinema and the country of Vietnam, which is innovating and developing.

=== Development ===
Vietnam International Film Festival officially changed its name to Hanoi International Film Festival since the 2nd festival (2012). Until 2014, the festival limited participants in the contest category to films from countries in the Asia-Pacific region. Since 2016, this limit is removed, films from all countries can enter the selection round for the competition category.

The criteria for selecting films into the competition category are also gradually becoming stricter, the last time it was films that had never competed at international film festivals in Asia (instead of only requiring films not yet competed in the Southeast Asian region). As such, the film will be newer and undiscovered at competitions in Asia.

Over the years, the number of films participating is increasing. The 6th Festival was scheduled to be held in October 2020 but had to be moved to 2022 due to the impact of the COVID-19 pandemic.

== Location ==
The main activities of the first festival were held at the National Convention Center, Tu Liem district. This location is quite far from the downtown area, where many promotional activities take place. Therefore, from the second festival, the main venue of the festival was moved to Hanoi Friendship Cultural Palace, Hoan Kiem district.

In addition, many promotional activities and exhibitions are held in squares and theaters in the vicinity such as Hanoi Opera House, Ly Thai To monument flower garden, etc. Films participating in the festival are screened at cinemas in Hanoi city.

== Festival program ==
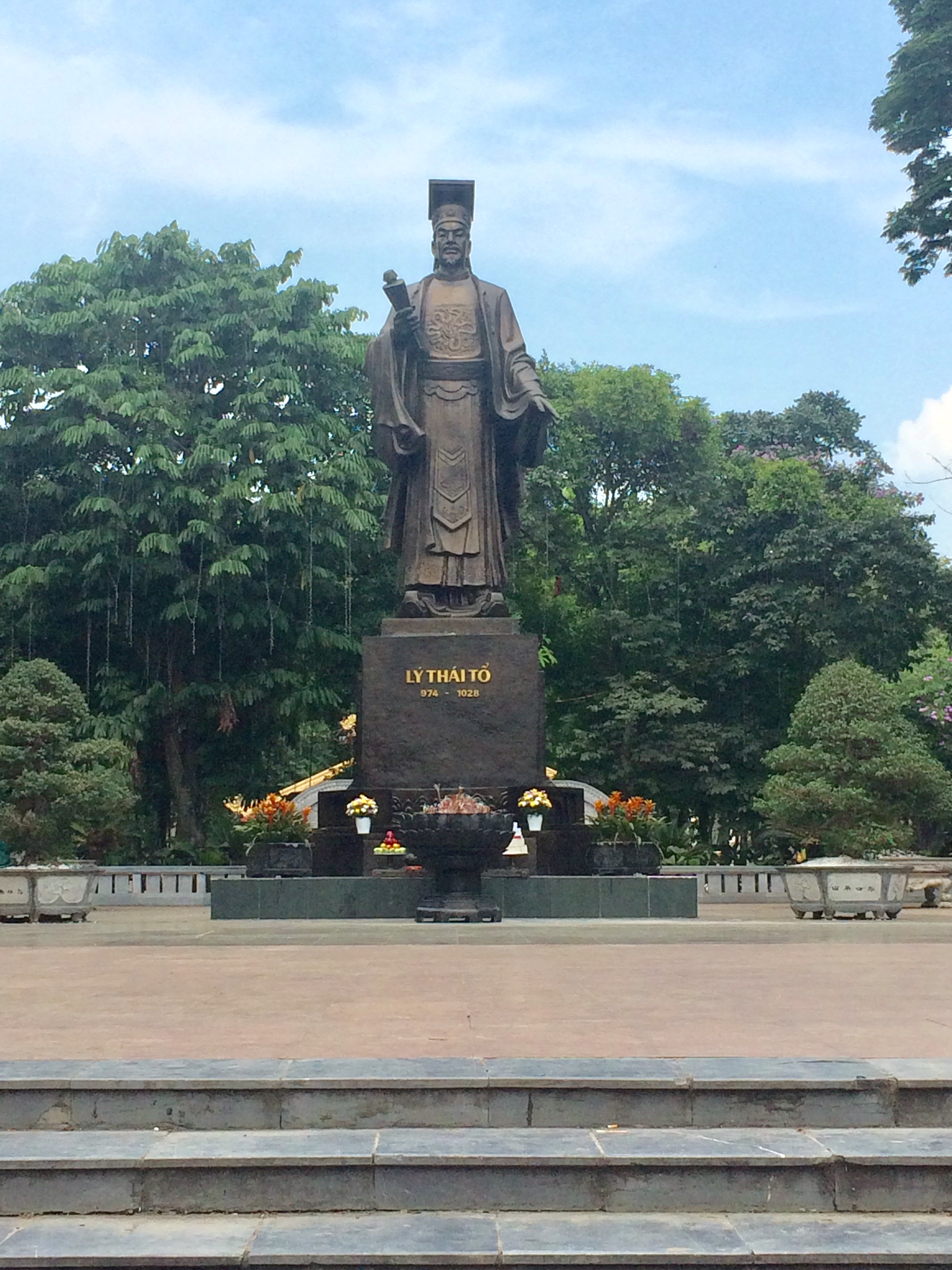
Lý Thái Tổ Monument Area, where outdoor movie screenings are usually held

=== Film Sections ===
The Hanoi International Film Festival is organised in various sections. Besides the periodic sections, each festival will have new programs according to the ideas of the organizers.

- In Competition:
  - Feature film section: The films competing for the Best Feature Film award and NETPAC award
  - Short film section: The films competing for the Best Short Film award
- Out of Competition:
  - Panorama: A selection of great movies from cinemas around the world, mostly in recent times
  - Country-in-Focus: Film selection program of any country with in-depth discussion about that country's cinema
  - Country-in-Selection: Film selection program to introduce a country's cinema
  - Contemporary Vietnamese Films: Introducing Vietnamese films produced in recent times

=== Activities ===
- Photo Exhibition: Usually organized by the Vietnam Film Institute, each year the theme is about a Vietnamese film issue or the image of Vietnam appearing in world cinema.
- Seminars: Each festival usually has 2 to 3 seminars, organized together with the Country-in-Focus program or discussing an issue of connection between Vietnamese cinema and the world.
- Outdoor screenings: Because the festival organizers cooperate with many other units for the purpose of promoting and creating exchange opportunities between artists and audiences.
- The HANIFF Campus: Organized by Vietnam Cinema Department in collaboration with Redbridge Film Service Co., Ltd. to find young talents in the field of cinema. Launched in 2012.
- The Film Project Market: Organized by BHD Company - Vietnam Media Corp in collaboration with the Cinema Department to find potential film projects to put into production. Launched in 2014.

== Juries ==
Up to now, each festival has established 3 official judges for the feature film section, the short film section and the NETPAC award (Network for Promotion of Asian Cinema).

The jury of a feature-length film is usually made up of five people. The Chairman over the years is as follows:

Bout	Year	President	Profession	Nationality
1st	2010	Phillip Noyce	Director	(Australia)
2nd	2012	Jan Schütte	Director	(Germany)
3rd	2014	Kirill Razlogov	Film critic	(Russia)
4th	2016	Régis Wargnier	Director	(France)
5th	2018	Oguri Kohei	Director	(Japan)
6th	2022	Janusz Kijowski	Director, screenwriter	(Poland)

The short film jury and the NETPAC Award jury are usually made up of 3 people each.

== Awards ==
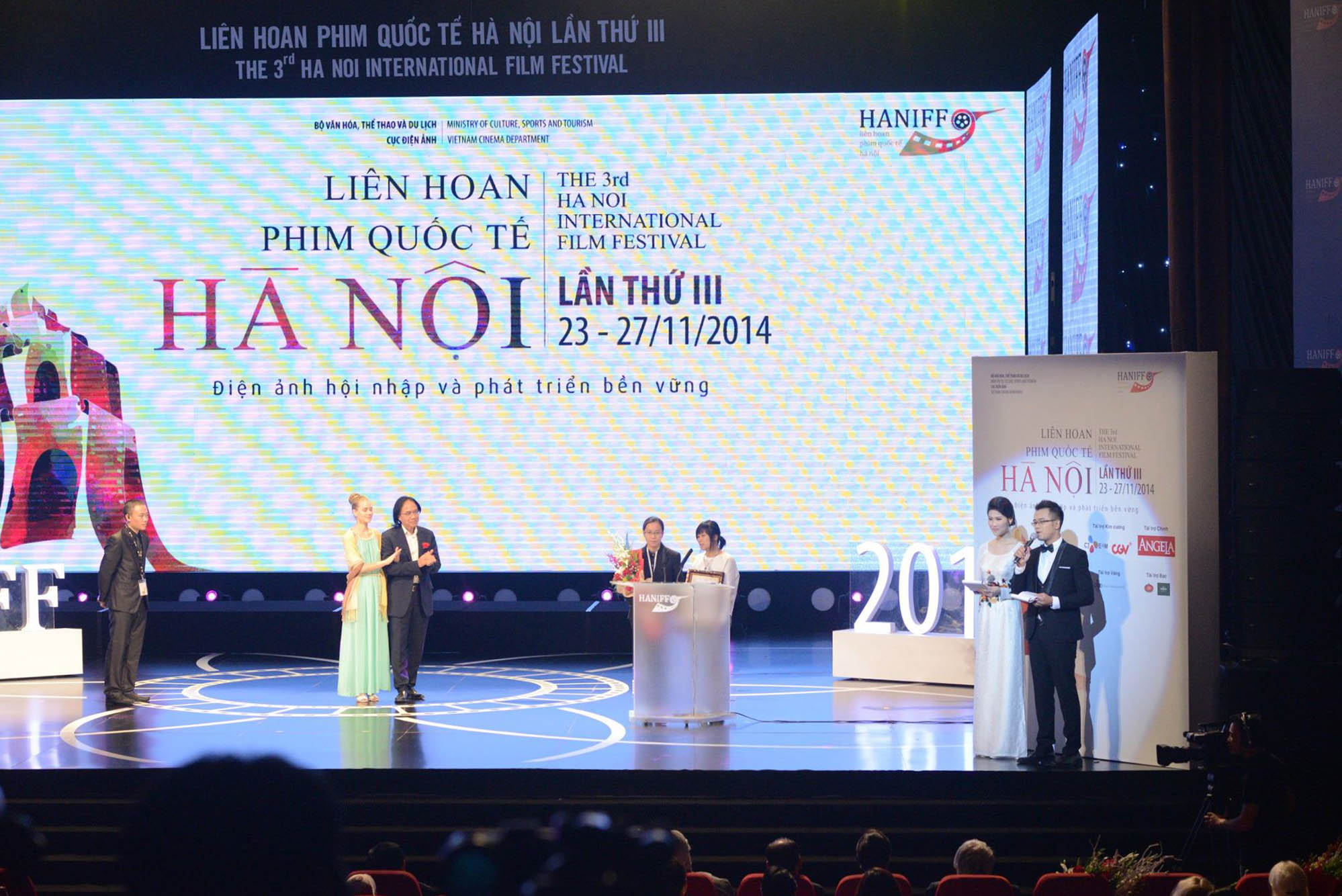
The film crew received the Jury Prize for Short Film at the festival in 2014.

The Film Festival's current awards are:

- Official Awards:
  - Best Feature Film
    - Jury Prize for Feature Film
  - Best Short Film
    - Jury Prize for Short Film
  - Best Director for Feature Film
  - Best Young Director for Short Film
  - Best Leading Actor for Feature Film
  - Best Leading Actress for Feature Film
  - NETPAC Award
- Others:
  - Audience Choice Award for Most Favourite Out-of-Competition Vietnamese Film
  - Best Student in the HANIFF Campus
  - Best Project in the Film Project Market
    - Jury Prize for Film Project

== See also ==
- Vietnam Film Festival, a domestic festival for Vietnamese Cinema
- National Television Festival of Vietnam
- Da Nang Asian Film Festival
- Ho Chi Minh City International Film Festival
