= Crazy Rook =

2015 Iranian film by Abolhassan Davoudi

- Directed by: Abolhassan Davoudi
- Written by: Mohammad Reza Gohari
- Produced by: Bita Mansouri; Maryam Zinati
- Starring: Tannaz Tabatabaei; Saed Soheili; Amir Jadidi; Bizhan Emkanian; Saber Abar; Nazanin Bayati; Gohar Kheirandish; Sahar Hashemi; Farnoush Al-e Ahmad; Amirmohammad Zand; Ali Baboli; Reza Ahaadi
- Music by: Karen Homayounfar
- Release date: 2015
- Running time: 115 minutes
- Country: Iran
- Language: Persian

Crazy Rook or Crazy Castle (Persian: رخ دیوانه, romanized: Rokh-e Divaneh) is a 2015 Iranian film directed by Abolhassan Davoudi and starring Tannaz Tabatabaei, Saed Soheili, Amir Jadidi, Bizhan Emkanian, Saber Abar, Nazanin Bayati and Gohar Kheirandish.

The film won the Best Director and Best Film awards in the 33rd Fajr International Film Festival.

== Synopsis ==
The story follows a group of friends who met through social media and got caught up in a criminal case, the process of solving which brings a new understanding of life and society to each of the group members.

== Cast ==
- Tannaz Tabatabaei as Mandana
- Saed Soheili as Masoud
- Amir Jadidi as Pirouz
- Saber Abar as Kaveh
- Nazanin Bayati as Ghazal
- Hojjat Hassanpour as Saman
- Gohar Kheirandish
- Bijan Emkanian

== Awards ==
- Winner Crystal Simorgh for Best Film
- Winner Crystal Simorgh for Best Director
- Winner Crystal Simorgh for Audience Award Best Film
