= Centipede (film) =

- Film poster
- Directed by: Abolhassan Davoudi
- Written by: Amir Baradaran; Peyman Jazini; Mostafa Zandi
- Produced by: Reza Rakhshan
- Starring: Reza Attaran; Javad Ezzati; Sara Bahrami; Mehran Ahmadi; Saeed Amirsoleimani; Shohreh Lorestani; Omid Rouhani
- Cinematography: Alireza Barazandeh
- Edited by: Bahram Dehghani
- Music by: Amirali Abedini
- Distributed by: Filmiran
- Release date: 4 July 2018
- Running time: 122 minutes
- Country: Iran
- Language: Persian
- Box office: 38 billion toman (Iran)

Centipede (Persian: هزارپا, romanized: Hezârpâ) is a 2018 Iranian comedy film directed by Abolhassan Davoudi and written by Amir Baradaran, Peyman Jazini, and Mostafa Zandi. It is the sixth highest-grossing film of all time in Iran. The film was theatrically released in Iran on 4 July 2018.

== Plot ==
Reza and his friend Mansoor are pickpockets. Reza lost one of his legs in an accident. When he finds out from his mother that a rich girl has vowed to marry a person injured in a war, he decides to get close to her and find a way to marry her and inherit her fortune.

== Cast ==
- Reza Attaran as Reza Niazi
- Javad Ezzati as Mansoor
- Sara Bahrami as Elham Abbasi
- Mehran Ahmadi as Uncle Kamran
- Saeed Amirsoleimani as Hassan
- Shohreh Lorestani as Shirin
- Omid Rouhani as Elham's Father

== Reception ==
=== Box office ===
The film broke several box office records and In the fifth week of its theatrical run, it became the highest-grossing film in Iran (until it was surpassed by Motreb). The film became a major box office success in Iran, grossing 30 billion toman in less than 2 months, and surpassing 4 million ticket sales in its first 45 days. It became the first Iranian movie to gross over 30 billion toman in Iran, in the seventh week of its release.

=== Home media ===
The film was released on a home media as a two-part film, each part lasting 90 minutes (the first part on 5 March and the second part on 13 March 2019). This caused protests and dissatisfaction from people. Critics said this was unusual and not enough information had been provided to buyers. Finally, the film distribution company stated that the reason for this was to increase the film duration from 122 minutes to 197 minutes and to add behind-the-scenes footage.
