= Year of the Cat =

Year of the Cat may refer to:

- Cat (zodiac), a Vietnamese zodiac sign
- Year of the Cat (album), a 1976 Al Stewart album
  - Year of the Cat (song), a single and title track from the album
- Saigon: Year of the Cat, a 1983 British television drama about the fall of Saigon
- The Year of the Cat (film), a 2024 Iranian comedy film
