= Tooba (TV series) =

2024 Iranian television series

- Genre: Drama
- Based on: "Touba's Arba'in" by Mohsen Emamian
- Written by: Hossein Amirjahani
- Directed by: Saeed Soltani
- Starring: Shabnam Ghorbani; Amin Zendegani; Soudabeh Beizaee; Parvis Fallahipour; Fariba Motekhases; Farhad A'ish; Rahim Norouzi; Hooman Barghnavard
- Composer: Sattar Oraki
- Country of origin: Iran
- Original language: Persian
- No. of seasons: 1
- No. of episodes: 54

Production
- Producer: Hamed Hosseini
- Cinematography: Alireza Zarrindast; Babak Saeedi
- Editor: Mehdi Hosseinivand
- Production company: Sima Film

Original release
- Network: IRIB TV1
- Release: August 3 – October 8, 2024

Touba (Persian: طوبی) is a 2024 Iranian television series directed by Saeed Soltani. Shabnam Ghorbani stars as the titular character, alongside Amin Zendegani, Soudabeh Beizaee, Parviz Fallahipour, Farhad A'ish, Fariba Motekhases, Rahim Norouzi, and Hooman Barghnavard. It aired on IRIB TV1 from August 2 to October 8, 2024 for 54 episodes.

== Premise ==
This series tells the life story of a girl named Tooba, based on true events and inspired by the book Arba'een-e Tooba. It spans a historical period of 40 years, from the early 1970s to 2011, and depicts a love story within this historical context. Among the various narratives, the theme of family plays a significant role, and the Arba'een pilgrimage is considered a key part of the story.

The Tooba series is a free adaptation of the book Arba'een-e Tooba written by researcher and translator Mohsen Emamian. While there are some differences between the series and the book, the core story remains the same, with most of the events portraying realities that occurred to Tooba, her family, and those around her. For instance, in the novel, Tooba's father dies during the clashes surrounding the coup of August 19, 1953, but in the series, this event occurs in the years leading up to the revolution and at the hands of the SAVAK. Additionally, some events and characters have been created by the director and writer to add more appeal to the story. One of the strengths of the series is its detailed portrayal, for the first time, of Saddam Hussein's horrific crimes and the Ba'ath Party, from the execution of high-ranking party members to the killing of ordinary people and pilgrims in Karbala and Najaf.

== Cast ==
- Shabnam Ghorbani as Touba Hamoun
- Amin Zendegani as Fakhreddin Mirjahan
- Soudabeh Beizaee as Anieh Komeil
- Parvis Fallahipour as Sheith Komeil
- Fariba Motekhases as Simin Malek
- Farhad A'ish as Nasser Malek
- Rahim Norouzi as Ebrahim "Jahangir" Sabeti
- Hooman Barghnavard as Emad Hamoun
- Zahra Sezavar as Parizad Hamoun
- Shima Jafarzadeh as Diba Hamoun
- Azam Kaboudian as Akram Rahimi
- Ramin Rastad as Nasim
- Shahin Taslimi as Zivar
- Mohammad Reza Helalzadeh as Zia Komeil
- Mehdi Solouki as Saed Mirjahan
- Mohammad Reza Samian as Mostafa Mirjahan
- Mohammad Rashno as Hamoud "Salim" Mirjahan
