= Soudabeh Beizaee =

Iranian actress (born 1981)

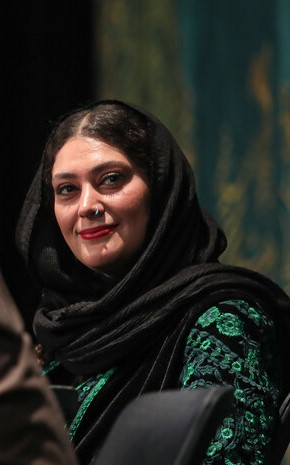
- Beyzaee at the 2024 Fajr International Film Festival
- Born: May 8, 1981 (age 45); Shiraz, Fars, Iran
- Occupations: Actress; director; producer; writer; sound recordist
- Years active: 2005–present

Soudabeh Beizaee (Persian: سودابه بیضایی; born May 8, 1981) is an Iranian actress, director, producer and writer. She is best known for her performance in Mohammad Rasoulof's A Man of Integrity (2017), which won the Un Certain Regard Award at the 2017 Cannes Film Festival. Beizaee also appeared in films and television series such as The Child and the Angel (2009), Black Intelligence (2010–2013), The Bright Day (2013), Amen (2015), Breath (2017), and Touba (2024).

== Filmography ==
=== Film ===
Year	Title	Role	Director	Notes	Ref(s)
2006	Shameless		Jamshid Heidari		
2009	The Child and the Angel		Masoud Naghashzadeh		
2013	The Bright Day	Afshar	Hossein Shahabi		
2017	A Man of Integrity	Hadis	Mohammad Rasoulof		
2018	Like My Name Pegah		Soudabeh Beizaee	Documentary; also as producer	
2020	Conflict		Mohammad Reza Lotfi		
2022	Song of the Wind		Soudabeh Beizaee	Documentary; also as producer	
2022	Boarding House		Maryam Ebrahimvand		
2023	Fragrant		Hadi Moghaddamdoost		
2024	Miro	Mahgol	Hossein Rigi		
2024	Winter Threshold		Soudabeh Beizaee	Documentary; also as producer	
2024	Aryashahr, Two People		Hamid Bahramian		

=== Television ===
Year	Title	Role	Director	Network	Notes	Ref(s)
2010–2013	Black Intelligence	Negar Azizi	Masoud Abparvar	IRIB TV3	TV series; supporting role	
2015	Kimia	Marzieh Taheri	Javad Afshar	IRIB TV2	TV series; recurring role	
2015	Amen	Nirvana	Manouchehr Hadi, Behrang Tofighi	IRIB TV1	TV series; main role	
2017	Breath		Jalil Saman	IRIB TV3	TV series; main role	
2021	A Cottage in Fog	Shirin	Hassan Lafafian	IRIB TV3	TV series; supporting role	
2024	Touba	Anieh Komeil	Saeed Soltani	IRIB TV1	TV series; main role	
2024	The Octopus	Azita	Ahmad Moazemi	IRIB TV1	TV series; supporting role	

== Bibliography ==
- Connection Point (2024)
