= Ayşegül Coşkun =

Turkish singer and actress

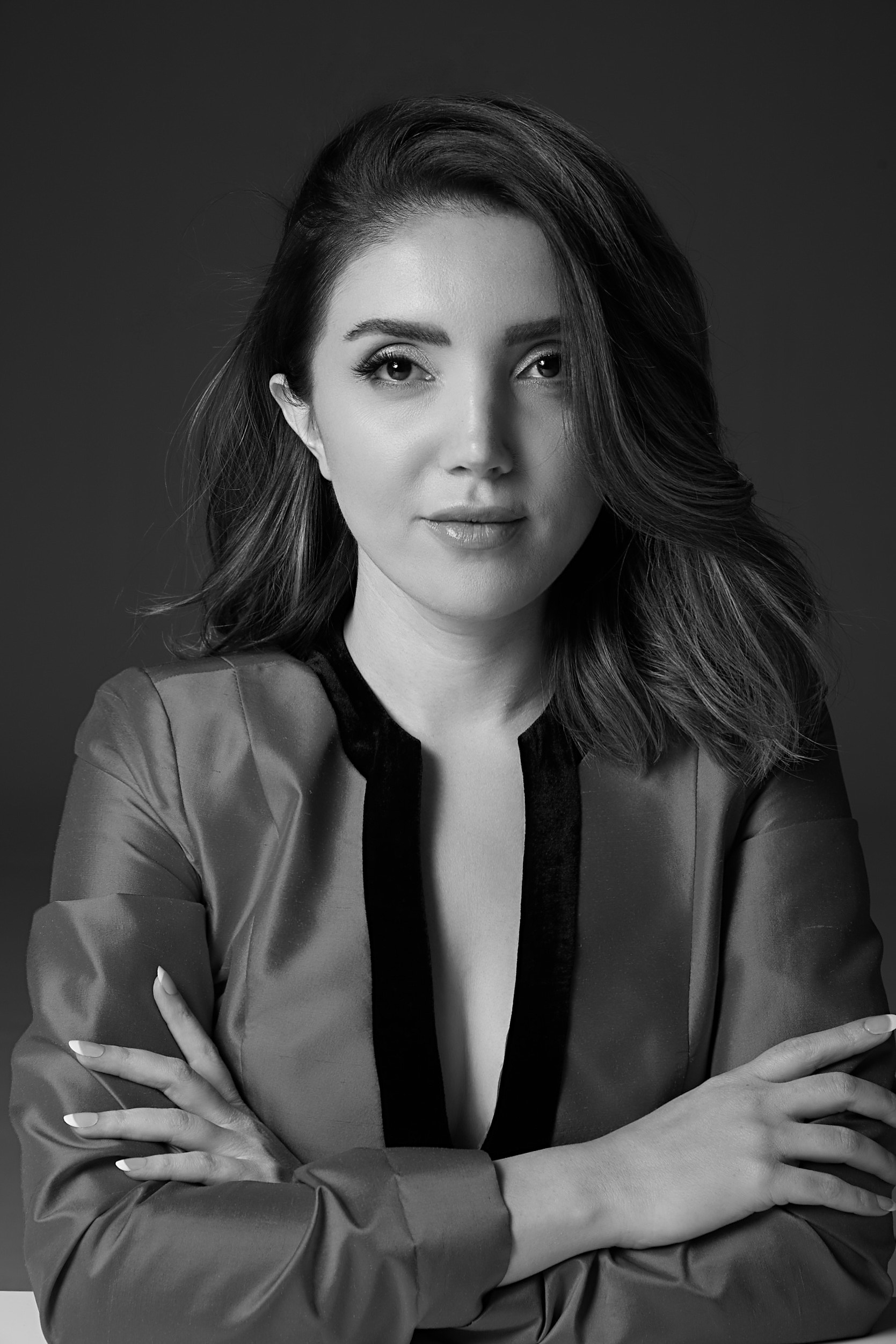
- Coşkun in 2021
- Born: 17 June 1985 (age 40); Istanbul, Turkey
- Occupation(s): singer, actress, lyricist
- Years active: 2014–present
- Known for: Motreb
- Website: aysegulcoskun.com

Ayşegül Coşkun (born 17 June 1985) is a Turkish singer, actress, and lyricist.

== Early life ==
Coşkun was born on 17 June 1985 in Istanbul. Her family originates from Erzincan. She was raised in an artistic family and was exposed to music from her childhood. Her father played wind instruments. She attended Firuza primary school, Kocataş Barbaros secondary school, and a high school in Sarıyer. According to her interview with Önce Vatan Gazetesi, Coşkun played in school bands throughout her education. She studied business administration at Atatürk University on the insistence of her family. After one year working in a private bank as an accountant, she became angry with her boss, and wrote several songs, ultimately leaving her job for songwriting and singing. She took some lessons on how to play guitar and piano as well as dancing and singing.

== Career ==
=== For Turkish audience ===
Coşkun released her first audio track titled "Gerçeğim Seninle" in 2014. "Cuk" was her first music video. She has a contract with Ayor Müzik. "Vur Dizine", "Duvardaki Gülüşler", "Deniz Ol Gel", and "Liman" are some of her later works. She told the Akşam Daily that because she is a Gemini, she feels herself a different person every day she wakes up and that is why her works are so different from each other. She has not achieved much fame in Turkey.

=== Discography ===
This is a list of musical works she has published as of 2021, all being singles except for Söz Verdim which is both the name of an album and a single.

Year	Work	
2014	"Gerçeğim Seninle"	
2015	"Cuk"	
2017	"Vur Dizine"	
2017	"Duvardaki Gülüşler"	
2018	"Liman"	
2019	"Deniz Ol Gel"	
2019	"İlahi Kader"	
2020	Söz Verdim	"Ah Benim Canım"
2020	Söz Verdim	"Söz Verdim"
2020	Söz Verdim	"Gelevera Deresi" – Koyverdun Gittun Beni
2020	Söz Verdim	"Ah Benim Canım" – DJ Mamsi Club Version
2021	"Mahvola"	
2021	"Reyhan"	
2022	"Deliriyorum"	

=== For Iranian audience ===
In 2019, Coşkun played the character Nazan in Motreb, the highest-grossing Iranian movie ever, becoming famous there. She learned Persian for her role in two months and wrote two songs for the movie as well. At first, Meryem Uzerli was considered for this role, but finally Coşkun was selected because Uzerli could not speak Persian. Being interested in Persian since childhood, Coşkun spoke it with her Iranian friends day and night for two weeks to develop a better command of the language. In 2021, she played Ayla in the third season of Made in Iran.

Coşkun performed a Turkish cover of "Behet Ghol Midam", the most viewed Iranian music video on YouTube, by Mohsen Yeganeh, who was the producer of the Turkish work as well. She also released "In Sedây-e Man-e", the closing credits soundtrack of Motreb, a duet with Parviz Parastui, whose Turkish lyrics she wrote.

Apart from her native Turkish, she can sing in Persian, Spanish, and Greek. Her clothing style has attracted the attention of people interested in fashion in Iran.

=== Filmography ===
Year	Film	Director	Role
2019	Motreb	Mostafa Kiyayi	Nazan
2021	Made in Iran	Bahman Goudarzi	Ayla
