= The Last Word (2009 film) =

- Film poster
- Persian: حرف آخر
- Directed by: Hossein Shahabi
- Written by: Pourang Makvandi
- Produced by: Hossein Sharifi
- Starring: Pourang Makvandi; Shima Nikpour; Ali Habibpoor; Hossein Alizadeh; Reza Abdollahi
- Cinematography: Saeed Khezrian
- Edited by: Hossein Shahabi
- Music by: Hossein Shahabi
- Production company: Baran Film House
- Distributed by: Baran Film House
- Release date: 2009
- Country: Iran
- Language: Persian

The Last Word (Persian: حرف آخر) is a 2009 Iranian film, directed and produced by Hossein Shahabi.

== Starring ==
- Pourang Makvandi
- Ali Habibpoor
- Shima Nikpour
- Hossein Alizâdeh
- Reza Abdollahi (actor)
- Mohammad Baghban
- Vahid Azadi
- Hossein Hatef
