= Shabnam Ghorbani =

Iranian actress (born 1989)

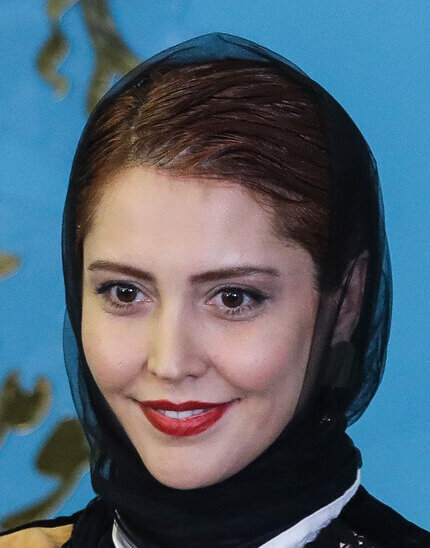
- Ghorbani at the 2025 Fajr Film Festival
- Born: July 10, 1989 (age 37); Tehran, Iran
- Occupation: Actress
- Years active: 2016–present
- Spouse: Amin Mirshekari (m. 2021)
- Children: 2

Shabnam Ghorbani (Persian: شبنم قربانی; born July 10, 1989) is an Iranian actress. She is best known for her roles in Any Day Now (2020), Queen of Beggars (2022), The Loser Man (2022), Alligator Blood (2024), and Touba (2024). In 2024, she won the Crystal Simorgh for Best Supporting Actress at the 42nd Fajr International Film Festival for her performance in Majnoon (2024).

== Early life ==
Shabnam Ghorbani was born on July 10, 1989, in Tehran, Iran.

== Career ==
=== 2016–2022: Early career ===
Ghorbani starred in the 2020 drama film Any Day Now, with actor Shahab Hosseini as his wife and appeared in the leading role for the first time. In 2022, she appeared in the neo-noir drama film The Loser Man, which was premiered at the 40th Fajr Film Festival and received positive reviews by critics for her performance.

=== 2023–present: Breakthrough ===
In 2024, she had two films premiered at the 42nd Fajr International Film Festival, the war drama film Majnoon and the comedy action film Alligator Blood. Her performance in Majnoon as Monireh Armaghan, Mehdi Zeinoddin's wife, was praised by critics and earned her the Crystal Simorgh for Best Supporting Actress. After the public screening of Alligator Blood, it became the fourth highest-grossing film in the history of Iran. The same year, Ghorbani appeared in the box office-hit comedy The Year of Cat. Although the film was met with negative reviews, it became the eleventh highest-grossing film in the history of Iran.

Ghorbani played the main role of the drama romantic series Touba (2024), for the first time. The series, which is an adaptation of the book Touba's Arba'in, tells the story of Touba Hamoun and her family between the 1970s and 2010s events. Despite receiving mixed reviews, mainly for the script and direction, the chemistry between the main couple, Ghorbani and Amin Zandengani made it one of the most watched series of the season.

== Personal life ==
On February 27, 2021, Ghorbani officially announced her marriage to Amin Mirshekari via a post on her official Instagram account. The couple has two children.

== Filmography ==
=== Film ===
Year	Title	Role	Director	Notes	Ref(s)
2017	Yellow		Mostafa Taghizadeh	Scenes deleted	
2020	Any Day Now	Mahtab Mehdipouri	Hamy Ramezan		
2022	The Loser Man	Marzieh	Mohammad Hossein Mahdavian		
2023	Nowhere	Mahsa	Erfan Parsapour	Short film	
2024	Alligator Blood	Anahita	Javad Ezzati		
2024	Majnoon	Monireh Armaghan	Mehdi Shamohammadi		
2024	The Year of the Cat	Taraneh	Mostafa Taghizadeh		
2024	Resemblance		Mehdi Marvdashti	Short film	
2025	Guardian of the Field	Helma	Mohammad Reza Kheradmandan		
2026	Gambler		Mohsen Bahari		
2026	Khanom Valedeh		Soheil Moafagh		

=== Web ===
Year	Title	Role	Director	Platform	Notes	Ref(s)
2021	Queen of Beggars	Sara Mahmoudi	Hossein Soheilizadeh	Filimo	Main role	
2022	Chameleon	Sahar	Borzou Niknejad	Filmnet	Main role	

=== Television ===
Year	Title	Role	Director	Network	Notes	Ref(s)
2019	The Moment of Twilight	Tannaz Harirchi	Homayoun As'adian	IRIB TV3	TV series; supporting role	
2023	Kufic Love	Naeleh	Hassan Akhoundpour	IRIB TV3	TV series; leading role, 15 episodes	
2024	Touba	Touba Hamoun	Saeed Soltani	IRIB TV1	TV series; leading role, 50 episodes	

== Awards and nominations ==
Name of the award ceremony, year presented, category, nominee of the award, and the result of the nomination
Award	Year	Category	Nominated Work	Result	Ref(s)
Fajr International Film Festival	2024	Best Actress in a Supporting Role	Majnoon	Won	
