= The Photo =

2001 film by Hossein Shahabi

The photo
- Poster
- Persian: عکس
- Directed by: Hossein Shahabi
- Written by: Hossein Shahabi
- Produced by: Hossein Sharifi
- Starring: Shima Nikpour; Sina Sayyadi; Mahdi Sharifi; Ali Habibpoor; Fariba Mortazavi; Farrokh Yazdanfar; niloofar kazemi
- Cinematography: Hamid Angaji
- Edited by: Hossein Shahabi
- Music by: Hossein Shahabi
- Production company: Afagh E Kish
- Distributed by: Baran Film House
- Release date: 2001
- Running time: 100 minutes
- Country: Iran
- Language: Persian

The Photo (Persian: عکس) is a 2001 Iranian drama film written and directed by Hossein Shahabi (Persian: حسین شهابی).

== Starring ==
- Sina Sayyadi
- Shima Nikpour
- Mahdi Sharifi
- Ali Habibpoor
- Fariba Mortazavi
- Farrokhe Yazdanfar
- Niloofar Kazemi

== Crew ==
- Director of Photography: Hamid Angaji
- Sound Recorder: Ablollahi
- Editor: Hossein Shahabi
- Music producer: Hossein Shahabi
- Costume Designer: Hossein Shahabi
- Makeup designer: Foroogholzaman Sharifi
- Planner: Fariba Mortazavi
- Assistant Director: Siavash Shahabi
