= Hoosh-e Siah =

- Persian: هوش سیاه
- English: Black Intelligence
- Genre: Action cyber crime
- Written by: Arash Ghaderi; Reza Orang; Niaz Esmaeilpour
- Directed by: Masoud Abparvar
- Starring: Hossein Yari; Keykavous Yakideh; Keyhan Maleki; Kamand Amirsoleimani; Dariush Asadzadeh; Soudabeh Beizaee; Majid Vasheghani; Reza Ashtiani; Arsalan Ghasemi; Kazem HajirAzad; Behrang Alavi; Reza Ashtiani; Arsalan Ghasemi; Behrang Alavi; Kiumars Malekmotei; Sadreddin Hejazi
- Composer: Arman Moosapoor
- Country of origin: Iran
- Original language: Persian
- No. of seasons: 2
- No. of episodes: 41

Production
- Producers: Abbas Fatemi; Morteza Fatemi
- Production locations: Iran; Istanbul, Turkey.
- Cinematography: Hashem Gerami
- Running time: 40-50 minutes

Original release
- Network: IRIB TV3, iFilm
- Release: 21 April 2010 – 18 June 2013

Hoosh-e Siah (Persian: هوش سیاه, lit. "Black Intelligence") is a 2010 Iranian TV series. it is directed by Masoud Abparvar. The main theme of the Hoosh-e Siah 1 series is about cyber crime.

The series is set in Iran and Istanbul, Turkey.

== Cast ==
- Hossein Yari
- Keykavous Yakideh
- Keyhan Maleki
- Kamand Amirsoleimani
- Dariush Asadzadeh
- Soudabeh Beizaee
- Majid Vasheghani as Iman Akbarnezhad (S2)
- Kazem HajirAzad
- Reza Ashtiani
- Arsalan Ghasemi
- Behrang Alavi
- Kiumars Malekmotei
- Sadreddin Hejazi
- Kianoosh Gerami
- Aliram Nooraei
- Davood Bagheri
- Arash Taj
- Amir-Reza Delavari
- Behzad Rahimkhani
- Hamid Ebrahimi
- Payam Dehkordi
- Zahra Saeedi
- Asghar Abgoon
- Behnaz Tavakoli
- Atabak Naderi
- Aida Makvandi
- Afshin Katanchi
