= Rain tree =

Rain tree is a common name for several plants and may refer to:

- Brunfelsia a genus of shrubs and small trees in the family Solanaceae, native to the tropical Americas
- Koelreuteria paniculata (golden rain tree) a tree in the family Sapindaceae, native to eastern Asia, in China and Korea
- Philenoptera violacea, a tree in the family Fabaceae, native to southern Africa
- Samanea saman, a tree in the family Fabaceae, native to a range extending from Mexico south to Peru and Brazil
- Raintree, a British subsidiary of Capstone Publishers
- Raintree Pictures, a Singapore media and entertainment company

== See also ==
- Rain Tree (film), a 2001 Iranian film
