= The Sale (film) =

The Sale (Persian: حراج)
- film poster
- Directed by: Hossein Shahabi
- Written by: Hossein Shahabi
- Produced by: Hossein Shahabi
- Starring: Fariba Khademi; Nasim Adabi; Mahsa Abiz; Ali Habibpoor
- Cinematography: Hooman Salmasi
- Edited by: Hossein Shahabi
- Music by: Hossein Shahabi- Babak Parsian
- Production company: Rain Home Movie
- Distributed by: Baran Film House
- Release date: 2014
- Running time: 98 minutes
- Country: Iran
- Language: Persian
- Box office: 1432000$

The Sale (Persian: حراج) is a 2014 Iranian social drama film produced & directed by Hossein Shahabi (Persian: حسین شهابی) This Film the first time screened in 21st film festival of vesoul France.

== Synopsis ==
Forough is a middle aged woman whose husband has temporarily married with another woman. Even though that was kept secret from her, but his action is considered legal in Iran. Now the husband is in prison, due to not being able to pay second wife’s “Mehrieh” (the bride’s marriage portion). The second wife intends to receive her Mehrieh by asking the court’s permission to sell his house. Forough, the first wife, in order to not lose her home, intends to sell all she has to pay for her husband’s debt and release him from the jail...

== Production ==
- Producer: Hossein Shahabi
- Production Manager: Mohammad Reza Najafi
- Procurement Manager:Morteza Khosravi
- Produced in Baran Film House, Iran, 2014

== Plot ==
- Hossein Shahabi
- Siavash Shahabi

== Starring ==
- Fariba Khademi
- Nasim Adabi
- Mahsa Abiz
- Mohammad Kart
- Maryam Sarmadi
- Ali Habibpoor
- Ahmad Shahabi
- Mohammad Akbari

== Crew ==
- Director Of Photography: Hooman Salmasi
- Sound Recorder: Mohammad Salehi
- Editors: Hossein Shahabi, Hossein Eyvazi
- Assistant director: Narjes Ebrahimi
- Music: Hossein Shahabi, Babak Parsian
- Costume Designer: Bahareh Amini
- Director of Consulting: Bahareh Ansari
- Planner: Narjes Ebrahimi
- Assistsnts Director: Idin Pedari, Siavash Shahabi, Javad Kahani

== International presence ==
- Companies at the 21st international film festival of Asian cinema, Vesoul, France (2015)
- Companies at the 15th Iranian film festival of Sweden (2015)
