= Mehdi Jafari =

Iranian film director (born 1969)

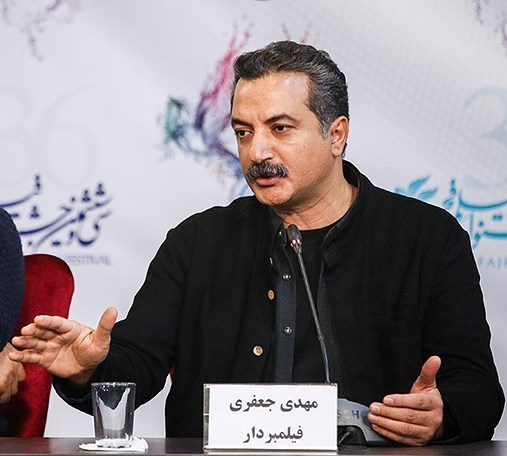
- Jafari at the 2018 Fajr Film Festival
- Born: 1969 (age 56–57); Ahvaz, Khuzestan, Iran
- Education: Tehran University of Art
- Occupations: Film director; Screenwriter; Cinematographer
- Spouse: Mahin Abbas Zadeh

Mehdi Jafari (Persian: مهدی جعفری) is an Iranian film director, screenwriter and cinematographer. In 2021, he won the Crystal Simorgh for Best Director at the 39th Fajr Film Festival.

Mehdi Jafari was born in 1969 in the city of Ahvaz . in his Youth he began his artistic career with theater acting . He obtained his B.A from the Arts Faculty at Tehran Art University in 1993 . after completing his education, he started participating in the making of fictional and documentary short films. after that he worked for ten years in the field of Advertisements.

since the year 2004, he has worked as a director of photography on around twenty Iranian films.

since 2016, he has begun making his own feature films.

The Presence of the Short Film A Little bit Higher in the Competition section of the Berlinale in 2006 is considered one of the honors of Iranian short Cinema.

== Fiction Short Films ==
Year	Title	Director	Writer	Format
1993	Ba madarbozorg	Yes	Yes	16 mm
1998	Pilgrimage	Yes	Mehdi Jafari -Mahin Abbaszadeh	35mm
2003	The Pond	Yes	Yes	35mm
2005	A little bit higher	Yes	Mehdi Jafari -Mahin Abbaszadeh	35mm
2006	All good days	Yes	Mahin Abbaszadeh	35mm
2006	The Window	Yes	Mehdi Jafari -Mahin Abbaszadeh	35mm

== Documentaries ==
Year	Title	Director	Writer	Time	Producer
2004	The Stories	Yes	Yes	80 min	The Documentary and Experimental Film Center
2006	Wherever I go the sky is mine	Yes	Safak Pavey	18 min	Kanoon Institute for the Development of Children and Youth in Iran / Bureau for Aliens and Foreign Immigrants Ministry of Interior, Iran
2007	The 23 (TV Series)	Yes	Yes	750 min	Alireza Reesian - IRIB Chanel 4
2016	Name and Particulars	Yes	Yes	65 min	Yes

== Feature films ==
Year	Title	Director	Writer	Producer
2016	Beluga			
2017	The Atmosphere Station	Yes	Yes	Executive
2019	The 23	Yes	Yes	No
2021	Yadoo	Yes	Yes	No
2025	The Tear of Reedbed	Yes	Yes	NO

== Cinematography ==
Year	Title
2007	The Night Bus
2011	Ephemeral Marriage
2012	A Respected Family
2013	The Corridor
2013	The Exclusive Path
2015	The ice age
2018	Damascus Time
2020	Abadan 11 60

=== Tv Series ===
Year	Title	Director	Writer
2025	The Sons of Reedbed	Yes	Yes

== Awards and nominations ==
Year	Award	Festival	Nominated work	Result	Ref.
1999	Special Awards	Torino International Film Festival	Pilgrimage	Won	
2005	Best Experimental film	Tehran Short Film Festival	The Pond	Won	
2006	Nominated	Berlinale Short Film Competition	A little bit higher	Nominated	
2007	Best short film	Didar International film festival. Tajikistan	A little bit higher	Won	
2006	Best short film	Ceremony of Khaneh Cinema	A little bit higher	Won	
2006	Francisco Garcia Award	Huesca film festival -Spain	The Window	Won	
2006	Golden Magnolia	Cyprus documentary film festival	Wherever I go the sky is mine	Won	
2016	special mention	Schlingel international film festival	Beluga	Won	
2019	National Golden Simorgh	Fajr Film Festival	The 23	Won	
2020	Best Film / Best film script / Best Director	Isfahan international film festival for Children and Youth	The 23	Won	
2021	Best Adapted Screenplay	Fajr Film Festival	Yadoo	Nominated	
2021	Best Director - Best Film		Yadoo	Won	
2022	Best Film / Best film script / Best Director	Isfahan international film festival for Children and Youth	Yadoo	Won	
