= Echo (1997 Iranian film) =

- Persian: پژواك
- Directed by: Hossein Shahabi
- Written by: Hossein Shahabi
- Produced by: Mansour Sharifian
- Starring: Fariba Mortazavi; Mohammad Sadegi; Mohammad Taheri; Amir Ahmadi; Nasim Mehrani
- Cinematography: Kazem Sarvar
- Edited by: Hossein Shahabi
- Music by: Hossein Shahabi
- Production company: Baran film house
- Distributed by: Kish TV Iran
- Release date: 1997
- Country: Iran
- Language: Persian

Echo (Persian: پژواك) is a 1997 Iranian drama film Written and directed by Hossein Shahabi (Persian: حسین شهابی)

== Starring ==
- Fariba Mortazavi
- Mohammad Sadegi
- Mohammad Taheri
- Reza Sabri
- Amir Ahmadi
- Nasim Mehrani
- Karim Novin

== Crew ==
- Producer: Mansour Sharifian
- cinematography: Kazem Sarvar
- Sound Recorder: Ali koohzad
- Costume Designer: Fariba Mortazavi
- Music: Hossein Shahabi
- Make Up: Sahar Amini
- Produced In Kish TV Iran 1997
