= Motreb =

Iranian movie

- Motreb movie poster
- Persian: مطرب
- Directed by: Mostafa Kiaie
- Written by: Mostafa Kiaie
- Produced by: Mostafa Kiaie
- Starring: Parviz Parastui; Elnaz Shakerdoost; Mehran Ahmadi; Ayşegül Coşkun; Mohsen Kiaie
- Cinematography: Hossein Jalili
- Edited by: Nima Ja'fari Jozani
- Music by: Arman Mousapour
- Distributed by: Filmiran
- Release date: 2019
- Running time: 107 minutes
- Country: Iran
- Languages: Persian and Turkish
- Budget: Rls.55,000,000,000
- Box office: Rls.385,464,540,000

Motreb (Persian: مطرب, meaning The Singer) is a 2019 Iranian comedy film directed, written, and produced by Mostafa Kiaie and starring Parviz Parastui, Elnaz Shakerdoost, Mehran Ahmadi, Ayşegül Coşkun, and Mohsen Kiaie. The film is about an Iranian nightclub singer, Ebrahim, who is forced to say goodbye to his lifelong dream of holding a concert in Iran because of the 1979 Islamic revolution. Pretending to be a folk vocalist, he is sent to Turkey to represent Iran in a musical festival, but Iranian officials discover that he is a prerevolution nightclub singer and prevent him from performing. He ultimately accomplishes to perform a concert in consort with his daughter-in-law, Nazan, who is a famous singer in Turkey.

Selling Rls.385,464,540,000, it is the highest-grossing Iranian movie as of 2021. The film screening was delayed because of the alleged similarities between the protagonist of the film and Ebi, an Iranian dissident singer.
