= Elevator (1995 film) =

- آسانسور
- Directed by: Hossein Shahabi
- Written by: Hossein Shahabi
- Produced by: Hossein Shahabi
- Starring: Nasim Shahed; Rasool Abdi; Hossein Alami; Koroshe Davoodi; Azar Vakil
- Cinematography: Hossein Shahabi
- Edited by: Hossein Shahabi
- Music by: Hossein Shahabi
- Production company: Baran film house
- Distributed by: Baran Film House
- Release date: 1995
- Country: Iran
- Language: Persian

Elevator (Persian: آسانسور) is a 1995 Iranian film written and directed by Hossein Shahabi (Persian: حسین شهابی).

== Starring ==
- Nasim Shahed
- Rasool Abdi
- Hossein Alami
- Karim Nobakht
- Koorosh Davoodi
- Azar Vakil

== Crew ==
- cinematography: Hossein Shahabi
- Sound Recorder: Shayan Marami
- Costume Designer: Peyman Aria
- Music: Hossein Shahabi
- Production: Baran film house
