= Nafas (TV series) =

2017 series

- Persian: نفس
- Genre: History, Romance
- Written by: Jalil Saman; Sadegh Khoshhal; Shabnam Alimagham; Narges Rostami
- Directed by: Jalil Saman
- Starring: Alireza Kamali; Sanaz Saeedi; Masoud Rayegan; Behnaz Jafari; Fatemeh Goudarzi; Pejman Jamshidi; Zhaleh Sameti; Elham Nami
- Theme music composer: Mohammad Esfahani
- Composer: Farid Saadatmand
- Country of origin: Iran
- Original language: Persian
- No. of seasons: 1
- No. of episodes: 30

Production
- Producer: Ahmad Kashanchi
- Production location: Tehran
- Cinematography: Sirus Abdoli
- Editors: Hassan Hassandoost; Nima Hassandoost
- Running time: 40 minutes

Original release
- Release: 7 July – 7 August 2017

Nafas (Persian: نفس) is an Iranian romance and historical drama series directed by Jalil Saman.

== Storyline ==
Nahid is a student girl who meets Roozbeh, a member of the Mujahedin. In the midst of the events of the Iranian Revolution, a secret is revealed in her life… She goes through complex events to reach the truth....

== Cast ==
- Alireza Kamali
- Sanaz Saeedi
- Masoud Rayegan
- Behnaz Jafari
- Fatemeh Goudarzi
- Pejman Jamshidi
- Zhaleh Sameti
- Elham Nami
- Dariush Farhang
- Ramin Rastad
- Soudabeh Beizaee
- Hadi Hejazifar
- Hedayat Hashemi
- Khosro Shahraz
- Ehsan Amani
- Ghorban Najafi
- Shahab Shadabi
- Atoosa Rasti
