= Abadan 1160 =

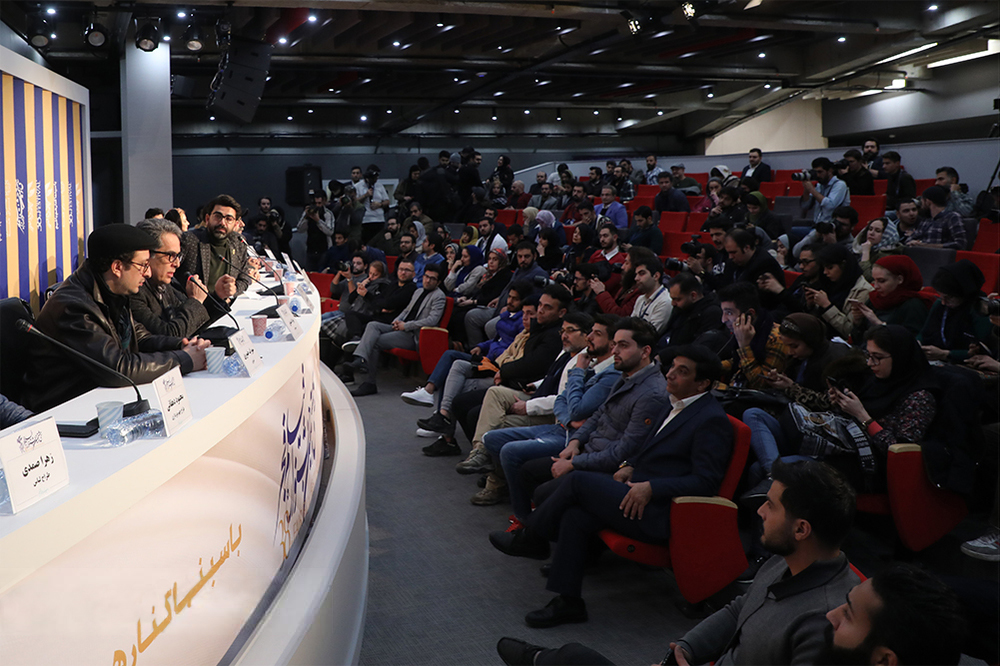
- Abadan 1160 movie press conference 2020-02-03
- Directed by: Mehrdad Khoshbakht
- Written by: Mehrdad Khoshbakht; Hossein Torab-Nejad
- Produced by: Hassan Kalami
- Starring: Alireza Kamali; Hassan Majooni; Nader Soleimani; Vida Javan
- Cinematography: Mehdi Jafari
- Edited by: Sohrab Khosravi
- Music by: Behzad Abdi
- Production company: Owj Arts and Media Organization
- Distributed by: Hozeh Honari
- Release date: 2020
- Running time: 90 minutes
- Country: Iran
- Language: Persian

Abadan 1160 (Farsi: آبادان 1160) is an Iranian film which deals with the beginning of the Iran-Iraq war; Directed by Mehrdad Khoshbakht and produced by Hassan Kalami, the film participated in the 38th Fajr Film Festival. Also, this film won the Golden Simorgh of Resistance at the 38th Fajr Film Festival and was also among the top 5 films of the audience in this period of the festival.

== Cast ==
- Alireza Kamali;
- Hassan Majoni;
- Shabnam Goodarzi;
- Hamidreza Mohammadi;
- Nader Soleimani; Vida Javan; Afshin Taei;
- Yasin Masoudi; Reza Masoudi; Vahid Kermani and Kazem Kamour.

== Other film crew members ==
Other film crew members include:

Director of photography: Mehdi Jafari; Second cinematographer: Davoud Mohammadi; Art director: Abdolhamid Ghadirian; Production manager: Rahmat Abdollahzadeh; Sound director: Jahangir Mirshekari; Composer: Behzad Abdi, Set secretary: Sanaz Farahani; Photographer: Ali Nik Baratar; Makeup designer: Mahmoud Dehghani; Planning manager and head of the directing team: Amirshahab Esmaeili; Set designer: Jafar Mohammad Shahi; Costume designer: Zahra Samadi; Editor: Sohrab Khosravi; Visual effects: Javad Matouri; Special field effects: Mohsen Roozbahani; Media consultant: Mehrdad Moazami.
