= Fatemeh Goudarzi =

Iranian actress

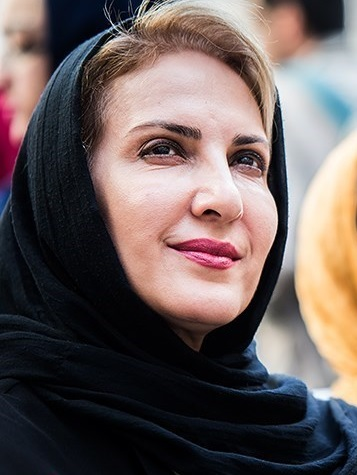
- Born: Fatemeh Gudarzi; July 10, 1963 (age 62); Borujerd, Iran
- Occupation: Actress
- Years active: 1988–present
- Spouse: m.r
- Children: Pouyan; Ava
- Awards: Crystal Simorgh for Best Actress 1999 For Ghazaal

Fatemeh Goudarzi (born 10 July 1963) is an Iranian actress.

== Filmography ==
- 2017 Nafas (TV series)
- 2008 Shirin
- 2007 Dasthay-e Khali
- 2006 Marriage, Iranian Style
- 1996 The Gazelle
- 1995 Mikhaham zende Bemanam
- 1994 Behesht-e Penhan
- 1993 Khaney-e Khalvat
- 1992 Mohajeran
- 1990 For Everything
- 1990 Ra'na (TV series)
- 1989 Galesh-haye Madarbozorg (TV series)
