= List of highest-grossing Iranian films =

List of Highest-Grossing Iranian Films
- Origin: Cinema of Iran
- Access to data: since 1985 (40–41 years ago)
- Current Recordholder: Seventy Thirty with 3.601 trillion Rls., released in 2024 (1 years ago)
- Longest Recordholders: 5 years: Eagles; The Changed Man; Deportees 2

This is a list of the highest-grossing Iranian films that have been able to set box office records. Currently, Seventy Thirty (2024) directed by Bahram Afshari, with a box office revenue of 360 billion tomans, is the highest-grossing Iranian film in its debut year of release, not accounting for inflation. Fossil (Karim Amini, 2023), with more than 7.4 million viewers, holds the record for the most-watch Iranian film in its debut year of release, and Eagles (Samuel Khachikian, 1985) with 10.2 million viewers is the most-watched film in Iranian cinema throughout its years of theatrical release.

== Highest-grossing films ==
The table below includes the 50 highest-grossing movies in the history of Iranian cinema.

- The highest-grossing Iranian film is currently Seventy Thirty, directed by Bahram Afshari and produced by Seyed Ebrahim Amerian. The film was produced in 2023 and premiered in Iranian Cinemas on November 27, 2024.
- The highest-grossing non-comedy Iranian film is currently Intoxicated by Love, produced by Mehran Broumand and directed by Hassan Fathi. The production of this film lasted from 2019 to 2021, and was released in 2024, currently ranking 8th in the box office chart.
- The highest-grossing animated film is currently Babaei the Hero, produced by Mohammad-Mehdi Mashkouri and co-directed by Hossein Safarzadegan and Meysam Hosseini. It premiered in 2024 and holds the 15th spot on the list.
- The highest-grossing children's film is currently Coconut 2, produced by Seyed Ebrahim Amerian and directed by Davoud Atyabi. It was produced in 2019 and had its theatrical release in 2023, currently ranking 32nd.
- The highest-grossing Iranian film during the COVID-19 pandemic was Dynamite, produced by Seyed Ebrahim Amerian and directed by Masoud Atyabi. It is currently 19th on the list.
- Among the 50 highest-grossing films in the history of Iranian cinema, there are 12 non-comedies, 5 animated films, and 33 comedies.
- The below rankings are based solely on the box office revenue at the time of each film's release and do not account for inflation.

†	Indicates films currently in theatrical release as of April 24th, 2025
x	Indicates film suspended during theatrical release

Highest-Grossing Iranian films
Rank	Peak	English Title	Original title	Genre	Gross (Rls.)	Admissions (Million tickets sold)	Year	Director
1	1	Seventy Thirty	هفتاد سی	Social Comedy	3,601,369,536,000	12.00M	2024	Bahram Afshari
2	1	Fossil	فسیل	Dramatic Comedy	3,245,265,020,000	10.81M	2023	Karim Amini
3	2	Hotel	هتل	Screwball Comedy	2,770,521,158,310	9.23M	2023	Masoud Atyabi
4	3	Texas 3	تگزاس ۳	Action Comedy	2,491,221,434,000	8.30M	2024	Masoud Atyabi
5	4	Pressure Cooker	زودپز	Comedy	2,299,118,125,000	7.66M	2024	Rambod Javan
6	3	Bloody Alligator	تمساح خونی	Action Comedy	1,682,804,272,500	5.61M	2024	Javad Ezzati
7	7	Breakfast with Giraffes	صبحانه با زرافه‌ها	Comedy	1,213,374,480,000	4.04M	2024	Soroush Sehhat
8	4	Intoxicated by Love	مست عشق	Historical Romantic Drama	1,203,493,207,500	4.01M	2024	Hassan Fathi
9	9	Dinosaur	دایناسور	Comedy	1,146,267,726,000	3.82M	2025	Masoud Atyabi
10	6	Pool & Party	پول و پارتی	Romantic Comedy	912,011,795,000	3.04M	2024	Saeid Soheili
11	6	Don't Be Embarrassed 2	خجالت نکش ۲	Romantic Comedy	862,619,442,000	2.87M	2024	Reza Maghsoudi
12	3	Hawaii	هاوایی	Comedy	835,504,657,500	2.78M	2024	Bahman Goudarzi
13	3	Lawless City	شهر هرت	Social Comedy	776,113,395,570	2.58M	2023	Karim Amini
14	1	Solitary	انفرادی	Action Comedy	775,862,250,000	2.58M	2022	Masoud Atyabi
15	14	Babaei the Hero	ببعی قهرمان	Children's Animation	679,265,180,000	2.26M	2024	Hossein Safarzadegan Meysam Hosseini
16	14	Year of the Cat	سال گربه	Comedy	646,065,900,000	2.15M	2024	Mostafa Taghizadeh
17	6	Beach Villa	ویلای ساحلی	Comedy	636,888,500,000	2.12M	2023	Kianoush Ayari
18	5	Extinction: A Journey to be a Real Hero	بچه‌زرنگ	Children's Animation	625,148,570,000	2.08M	2023	Behnoud Nekooyi Hadi Mohammadian Mohammad-Javad Janati
19	1	Dynamite	دینامیت	Comedy	588,013,425,000	1.96M	2021	Masoud Atyabi
20	3	Bucharest	بخارست	Comedy	548,291,389,500	1.82M	2022	Masoud Atyabi
21	21	Moses the Kalimullah: At Dawn	موسی کلیم‌الله: به وقت طلوع	Religious Biography	540,979,727,500	1.80M	2025	Ebrahim Hatamikia
22	13	Bodiless	بی‌بدن	Crime Drama	465,399,245,000	1.55M	2024	Morteza Alizadeh
23	23	Molotov Cocktail	کوکتل مولوتف	Comedy	461,546,039,400	1.53M	2024	Hossein Amiri-Domari
24	22	The Crab	خرچنگ	Comedy	422,180,221,000	1.40M	2023	Mostafa Shayesteh
25	3	Sag Band	سگ‌بند	Comedy	421,478,270,000	1.40M	2022	Mehran Ahmadi
26	2	Guidance Patrol 3	گشت ارشاد ۳	Social Comedy	420,847,762,520	1.40M	2021	Saeid Soheili
27	1	The Singer	مطرب	Social Musical	385,464,560,000	1.28M	2019	Mostafa Kiaei
28	1	Centipede	هزارپا	Comedy	380,638,480,000	1.26M	2018	Abulhassan Davoodi
29	26	Aryashahr, Two People	آریاشهر دو نفر	Comedy	353,296,530,000	1.17M	2024	Hamid Bahramian
30	9	Conjugal Visit	ملاقات خصوصی	Romantic Drama	339,377,730,000	1.13M	2022	Omid Shams
31	15	Entry and Exit Prohibited	ورود و خروج ممنوع	Dramatic Comedy	315,066,080,000	1.05M	2023	Omid Aghaei
32	16	Coconut 2	نارگیل ۲	Musical Comedy	281,955,320,000		2023	Davoud Atyabi
33	30	Kianoush's Garden	باغ کیانوش	Children's Action	279,148,790,000		2024	Reza Keshavarz Haddad
34	2	Just 6.5	متری شیش و نیم	Social Crime	277,202,390,000		2019	Saeid Roustayi
35	35	Raha	رها	Drama	275,504,664,000		2025	Hesam Farahmand
36	26	Ghif	قیف	Comedy	272,884,451,000		2024	Mohsen Amiryoussefi
37	29	Go Free	مفت‌بر	Romantic Comedy	260,105,186,000		2024	Adel Tabrizi
38	3	Texas 2	تگزاس ۲	Action Comedy	250,881,120,000		2019	Masoud Atyabi
39	10	Dolphin Boy	پسر دلفینی	Children's Animation	236,023,772,500		2022	Mohammad Kheirandish
40	2	Rahman 1400	رحمان ۱۴۰۰	Comedy	225,683,410,000		2019	Manouchehr Hadi
41	11	Grassland	علفزار	Crime Drama	221,128,320,000		2022	Kazem Daneshi
42	11	TiTi	تی تی	Drama	215,452,960,000		2020	Ida Panahandeh
43	15	Loopetoo	لوپتو	Children's Animation	213,878,870,000		2022	Amir-Abbas Askari
44	1	Sperm Whale 2: Roya's Selection	نهنگ عنبر ۲: سلکشن رؤیا	Dramatic Comedy	209,918,985,000		2017	Saman Moghaddam
45	15	Pinto	ابلق	Drama	208,210,000,000		2021	Narges Abyar
46	2	Wing Mirror	آینه بغل	Comedy	207,659,375,000		2017	Manouchehr Hadi
47	47	Dolphin Boy 2	پسر دلفینی ۲	Children's Animation	204,972,950,000		2025	Mohammad Kheirandish
48	1	Guidance Patrol 2	گشت ارشاد ۲	Comedy	199,142,968,000		2017	Saeid Soheili
49	16	Amphibious	دوزیست	Drama	199,142,352,500		2020	Borzou Nicknezhad
50	23	3 Puffs	سه کام حبس	Drama	196,814,190,000		2020	Saman Salur

== Highest-grossing films adjusted for inflation ==
Taking into account the Consumer Price Index released every year by the Central Bank of Iran, the 10 inflation-adjusted highest-grossing Iranian films are listed below. Fossil, directed by Karim Amini, which premiered in 2023, is the highest-grossing Iranian film in its debut-year, adjusting for inflation. Currently the 2nd spot is held by the film Seventy Thirty, directed by Bahram Afshari, which premiered in 2024 and grossed more than 3.57 trillion Iranian Rials. Hotel, directed by Masoud Atyabi is currently 3rd, which premiered in 2023 and had a gross inflation-adjusted revenue of 3.56 trillion Iranian Rials.

†	Indicates films currently in theatrical release as of April 24th, 2025

Highest-Grossing Iranian Films as of 1403 SH, adjusted for inflation
Rank	English Title	Original title	Genre	Inflation-Adjusted Gross (2024) Rls.	Year
1	Fossil	فسیل	Dramatic Comedy	4.26 trillion	2023
2	Seventy Thirty	هفتاد سی	Social Comedy	3.60 trillion	2024
3	Hotel	هتل	Screwball Comedy	3.56 trillion	2023
4	Deportees 2	اخراجی‌ها ۲	War Comedy	3.03 trillion	2009
5	The Viper	افعی	Action Thriller	2.57 trillion	1993
6	The Snowman	آدم‌برفی	Comedy	2.54 trillion	1997
7	The Bride	عروس	Drama	2.52 trillion	1991
8	Texas 3	تگزاس ۳	Action Comedy	2.49 trillion	2024
9	Courtship	خواستگاری	Comedy	2.47 trillion	1990
10	Red Hat and Cousin	کلاه‌قرمزی و پسرخاله	Children's Musical Comedy	2.45 trillion	1994

== Highest-grossing films per year ==
High-grossing Iranian films by year of release
Year	Title	Genre	Gross (Rls.)	Ticket Sales
1985	Eagles	War Drama	288,401,730	3,245,859
1986	The Lost	Drama	203,094,090	2,278,889
1987	The Tenants	Dramatic Comedy	339,238,580	3,051,390
1988	Kani-Manga	War Drama	398,383,770	3,503,908
1989	Horizon	War Drama	373,610,650	2,757,170
1990	Courtship	Drama	740,623,840	4,340,193
1991	The Bride	Romantic Drama	1,152,775,830	4,423,538
1992	What's Up?	Dramatic Comedy	992,913,480	2,779,863
1993	The Viper	War Action	1,990,308,710	4,517,643
1994	Kolah Ghermezi and Pesar Khaleh	Children's Musical Comedy	2,957,930,750	4,301,848
1995	Flight from the Camp	War Action	1,968,071,700	3,102,374
1996	Strange Sisters	Drama	3,705,246,300	3,219,421
1997	The Snowman	Dramatic Comedy	5,863,852,200	4,473,277
1998	The Changed Man	Comedy	8,493,646,200	3,792,033
1999	Red	Drama	7,949,039,600	3,061,010
2000	Hemlock	Drama	7,743,498,700	2,700,269
2001	Saint Mary	Religious Biography	6,841,967,500	1,835,501
2002	Kolah Ghermezi and Sarvenaz	Children's Musical Comedy	8,348,851,000	1,561,455
2003	Tokyo Non-Stop	Dramatic Comedy	7,252,626,000	1,325,993
2004	Coma	Dramatic Comedy	11,075,002,500	1,944,858
2005	The Aquarium	Romantic Drama	8,905,683,900	1,274,546
2006	Cease Fire	Romantic Comedy	16,512,036,500	1,899,231
2007	Deportees	War Comedy	23,178,697,000	2,106,026
2008	Chargingo	Adventure Comedy	19,065,055,000	1,379,368
2009	Deportees 2	War Comedy	79,283,117,000	5,348,709
2010	The Kingdom of Solomon	Religious History	28,496,281,500	1,349,069
2011	Deportees 3	War Comedy	47,358,274,400	2,223,457
2012	Kolah Ghermezi and Bache Naneh	Children's Musical Comedy	47,541,039,000	1,468,899
2013	Notoriety	Dramatic Comedy	40,826,050,000	1,128,715
2014	City of Mice 2	Children's Musical	98,173,134,000	2,334,522
2015	Muhammad: The Messenger of God	Religious Biography	145,588,293,000	2,463,125
2016	The Salesman	Drama	157,149,196,000	2,160,050
2017	Sperm Whale 2: Roya's Selection	Dramatic Comedy	209,918,955,000	2,674,648
2018	Centipede	Comedy	380,638,480,000	4,218,793
2019	Motreb	Comedy	385,458,342,000	3,297,138
2020	Drown	Drama	36,760,000,000	214,805
2021	Dynamite	Comedy	581,783,700,000	2,589,298
2022	Solitary	Action Comedy	775,869,225,000	2,434,463
2023	Fossil	Dramatic Comedy	3,245,265,020,000	7,487,352
2024	Seventy Thirty	Social Comedy	3,378,562,570,000	5,746,550

- The Snowman (1997) could not obtain the permit to premiere for 3 years due to the cross-dressing of actor Akbar Abdi as a part of his role.
- In 2020, Iranian cinema was shut down due to the COVID-19 pandemic in Iran.

== Timeline of highest-grossing films ==
Timeline of the Recordholders for the Highest-Grossing Iranian Film
Timeline	Premiere	Established	Title	Record setting gross (Rls.)
1985–1990	1985	1985	Eagles	288,401,730
1985–1990	1985	1986	Eagles	477,676,580
1985–1990	1985	1987	Eagles	531,635,030
1985–1990	1985	1988	Eagles	604,919,470
1985–1990	1985	1989	Eagles	666,774,980
1990–1991	1990	1990	Courtship	740,623,840
1991–1993	1991	1991	The Bride	1,152,775,830
1991–1993	1991	1992	The Bride	1,261,707,890
1993–1994	1993	1993	The Viper	1,990,308,710
1994–1997	1994	1994	Kolah Ghermezi and Pesar Khaleh	2,957,930,750
1994–1997	1994	1995	Kolah Ghermezi and Pesar Khaleh	4,136,725,700
1994–1997	1994	1996	Kolah Ghermezi and Pesar Khaleh	4,179,493,900
1997–1998	1997	1997	The Snowman	5,863,852,200
1998–2003	1998	1998	The Changed Man	8,493,646,200
1998–2003	1998	1999	The Changed Man	9,018,603,300
1998–2003	1998	2000	The Changed Man	9,027,622,300
2003–2004	2002	2003	Kolah Ghermezi and Sarvenaz	9,777,383,000
2004–2006	2004	2004	Coma	11,075,002,500
2004–2006	2004	2005	Coma	11,089,817,000
2006–2007	2006	2006	Cease Fire	16,512,036,500
2007–2009	2007	2007	Deportees	23,178,697,000
2007–2009	2007	2008	Deportees	23,191,717,000
2009–2014	2009	2009	Deportees 2	79,283,117,000
2014–2015	2014	2014	City of Mice 2	98,173,134,000
2015–2016	2015	2015	Muhammad: The Messenger of God	145,588,293,000
2016–2017	2016	2016	I Am Not Salvador	169,517,171,000
2017–2018	2017	2017	Sperm Whale 2: Roya's Selection	209,918,955,000
2018–2019	2018	2018	Centipede	380,638,480,000
2019–2021	2019	2019	The Singer	385,458,342,000
2021-2022	2021	2021	Dynamite	581,779,657,400
2022-2023	2022	2022	Solitary	775,864,505,000
2023-2024	2023	2023	Fossil	3,245,265,020,000
2024-	2024	2024	Seventy Thirty	3,340,698,855,000
2024-	2024	2025	Seventy Thirty	3,601,369,536,000

== See also ==
- List of highest-grossing films
- Lists of highest-grossing films

== Endnotes ==
=== Sources ===
- Fathi, Zohreh; Khamoushi, Pantea (2016a). Sadreddini, Alireza (ed.). سالنامه آماری سینمای ایران سال ۱۳۶۴ [1985–1986 Statistical Yearbook of the Cinema of Iran] (PDF) (Report) (in Persian). Iranian Organization of Cinema and Audiovisual Affairs. Archived from the original (PDF) on 7 October 2019.
- Fathi, Zohreh; Khamoushi, Pantea (2016b). Sadreddini, Alireza (ed.). سالنامه آماری سینمای ایران سال ۱۳۶۵ [1986–1987 Statistical Yearbook of the Cinema of Iran] (PDF) (Report) (in Persian). Iranian Organization of Cinema and Audiovisual Affairs. Archived from the original (PDF) on 7 October 2019.
- Fathi, Zohreh; Khamoushi, Pantea (2016c). Sadreddini, Alireza (ed.). سالنامه آماری سینمای ایران سال ۱۳۶۶ [1987–1988 Statistical Yearbook of the Cinema of Iran] (PDF) (Report) (in Persian). Iranian Organization of Cinema and Audiovisual Affairs. Archived from the original (PDF) on 7 October 2019.
- Fathi, Zohreh; Khamoushi, Pantea (2016d). Sadreddini, Alireza (ed.). سالنامه آماری سینمای ایران سال ۱۳۶۷ [1988–1989 Statistical Yearbook of the Cinema of Iran] (PDF) (Report) (in Persian). Iranian Organization of Cinema and Audiovisual Affairs. Archived from the original (PDF) on 7 October 2019.
- Fathi, Zohreh; Khamoushi, Pantea (2016e). Sadreddini, Alireza (ed.). سالنامه آماری سینمای ایران سال ۱۳۶۸ [1989–1990 Statistical Yearbook of the Cinema of Iran] (PDF) (Report) (in Persian). Iranian Organization of Cinema and Audiovisual Affairs. Archived from the original (PDF) on 5 October 2019.
- Fathi, Zohreh; Khamoushi, Pantea (2016f). Sadreddini, Alireza (ed.). سالنامه آماری سینمای ایران سال ۱۳۶۹ [1990–1991 Statistical Yearbook of the Cinema of Iran] (PDF) (Report) (in Persian). Iranian Organization of Cinema and Audiovisual Affairs. Archived from the original (PDF) on 5 October 2019.
- Fathi, Zohreh; Khamoushi, Pantea (2016g). Sadreddini, Alireza (ed.). سالنامه آماری سینمای ایران سال ۱۳۷۰ [1991–1992 Statistical Yearbook of the Cinema of Iran] (PDF) (Report) (in Persian). Iranian Organization of Cinema and Audiovisual Affairs. Archived from the original (PDF) on 5 October 2019.
- Fathi, Zohreh; Khamoushi, Pantea (2017a). Sadreddini, Alireza (ed.). سالنامه آماری سینمای ایران سال ۱۳۷۱ [1992–1993 Statistical Yearbook of the Cinema of Iran] (PDF) (Report) (in Persian). Iranian Organization of Cinema and Audiovisual Affairs. Archived from the original (PDF) on 5 October 2019.
- Fathi, Zohreh; Khamoushi, Pantea (2017b). Sadreddini, Alireza (ed.). سالنامه آماری سینمای ایران سال ۱۳۷۲ [1993–1994 Statistical Yearbook of the Cinema of Iran] (PDF) (Report) (in Persian). Iranian Organization of Cinema and Audiovisual Affairs. Archived from the original (PDF) on 5 October 2019.
- Fathi, Zohreh; Khamoushi, Pantea (2017c). Sadreddini, Alireza (ed.). سالنامه آماری سینمای ایران سال ۱۳۷۳ [1994–1995 Statistical Yearbook of the Cinema of Iran] (PDF) (Report) (in Persian). Iranian Organization of Cinema and Audiovisual Affairs. Archived from the original (PDF) on 5 October 2019.
- Fathi, Zohreh; Khamoushi, Pantea (2017d). Sadreddini, Alireza (ed.). سالنامه آماری سینمای ایران سال ۱۳۷۴ [1995–1996 Statistical Yearbook of the Cinema of Iran] (PDF) (Report) (in Persian). Iranian Organization of Cinema and Audiovisual Affairs. Archived from the original (PDF) on 7 October 2019.
- Fathi, Zohreh; Khamoushi, Pantea (2017e). Sadreddini, Alireza (ed.). سالنامه آماری سینمای ایران سال ۱۳۷۵ [1996–1997 Statistical Yearbook of the Cinema of Iran] (PDF) (Report) (in Persian). Iranian Organization of Cinema and Audiovisual Affairs. Archived from the original (PDF) on 5 October 2019.
- Fathi, Zohreh; Khamoushi, Pantea (2017f). Sadreddini, Alireza (ed.). سالنامه آماری سینمای ایران سال ۱۳۷۶ [1997–1998 Statistical Yearbook of the Cinema of Iran] (PDF) (Report) (in Persian). Iranian Organization of Cinema and Audiovisual Affairs. Archived from the original (PDF) on 5 October 2019.
- Fathi, Zohreh; Khamoushi, Pantea (2017g). Sadreddini, Alireza (ed.). سالنامه آماری سینمای ایران سال ۱۳۷۷ [1998–1999 Statistical Yearbook of the Cinema of Iran] (PDF) (Report) (in Persian). Iranian Organization of Cinema and Audiovisual Affairs. Archived from the original (PDF) on 5 October 2019.
- Fathi, Zohreh; Khamoushi, Pantea (2017h). Sadreddini, Alireza (ed.). سالنامه آماری سینمای ایران سال ۱۳۷۸ [1999–2000 Statistical Yearbook of the Cinema of Iran] (PDF) (Report) (in Persian). Iranian Organization of Cinema and Audiovisual Affairs. Archived from the original (PDF) on 22 September 2019.
- Fathi, Zohreh; Khamoushi, Pantea (2017i). Sadreddini, Alireza (ed.). سالنامه آماری سینمای ایران سال ۱۳۷۹ [2000–2001 Statistical Yearbook of the Cinema of Iran] (PDF) (Report) (in Persian). Iranian Organization of Cinema and Audiovisual Affairs. Archived from the original (PDF) on 7 October 2019.
- Fathi, Zohreh; Khamoushi, Pantea (2017j). Sadreddini, Alireza (ed.). سالنامه آماری سینمای ایران سال ۱۳۸۰ [2001–2002 Statistical Yearbook of the Cinema of Iran] (PDF) (Report) (in Persian). Iranian Organization of Cinema and Audiovisual Affairs. Archived from the original (PDF) on 5 October 2019.
- Fathi, Zohreh; Khamoushi, Pantea (2017k). Sadreddini, Alireza (ed.). سالنامه آماری سینمای ایران سال ۱۳۸۱ [2002–2003 Statistical Yearbook of the Cinema of Iran] (PDF) (Report) (in Persian). Iranian Organization of Cinema and Audiovisual Affairs. Archived from the original (PDF) on 5 October 2019.
- Fathi, Zohreh; Khamoushi, Pantea (2017l). Sadreddini, Alireza (ed.). سالنامه آماری سینمای ایران سال ۱۳۸۲ [2003–2004 Statistical Yearbook of the Cinema of Iran] (PDF) (Report) (in Persian). Iranian Organization of Cinema and Audiovisual Affairs. Archived from the original (PDF) on 7 October 2019.
- Fathi, Zohreh; Khamoushi, Pantea (2017m). Sadreddini, Alireza (ed.). سالنامه آماری سینمای ایران سال ۱۳۸۳ [2004–2005 Statistical Yearbook of the Cinema of Iran] (PDF) (Report) (in Persian). Iranian Organization of Cinema and Audiovisual Affairs. Archived from the original (PDF) on 7 October 2019.
- Fathi, Zohreh; Khamoushi, Pantea (2017n). Sadreddini, Alireza (ed.). سالنامه آماری سینمای ایران سال ۱۳۸۴ [2005–2006 Statistical Yearbook of the Cinema of Iran] (PDF) (Report) (in Persian). Iranian Organization of Cinema and Audiovisual Affairs. Archived from the original (PDF) on 7 October 2019.
- Fathi, Zohreh; Khamoushi, Pantea (2017o). Sadreddini, Alireza (ed.). سالنامه آماری سینمای ایران سال ۱۳۸۵ [2006–2007 Statistical Yearbook of the Cinema of Iran] (PDF) (Report) (in Persian). Iranian Organization of Cinema and Audiovisual Affairs. Archived from the original (PDF) on 5 October 2019.
- Fathi, Zohreh; Khamoushi, Pantea (2017p). Sadreddini, Alireza (ed.). سالنامه آماری سینمای ایران سال ۱۳۸۶ [2007–2008 Statistical Yearbook of the Cinema of Iran] (PDF) (Report) (in Persian). Iranian Organization of Cinema and Audiovisual Affairs. Archived from the original (PDF) on 7 October 2019.
- Fathi, Zohreh; Khamoushi, Pantea (2018a). Sadreddini, Alireza (ed.). سالنامه آماری سینمای ایران سال ۱۳۸۷ [2008–2009 Statistical Yearbook of the Cinema of Iran] (PDF) (Report) (in Persian). Iranian Organization of Cinema and Audiovisual Affairs. Archived from the original (PDF) on 5 October 2019.
- Fathi, Zohreh; Khamoushi, Pantea (2018b). Sadreddini, Alireza (ed.). سالنامه آماری سینمای ایران سال ۱۳۸۸ [2009–2010 Statistical Yearbook of the Cinema of Iran] (PDF) (Report) (in Persian). Iranian Organization of Cinema and Audiovisual Affairs. Archived from the original (PDF) on 5 October 2019.
- Fathi, Zohreh; Khamoushi, Pantea (2018c). Sadreddini, Alireza (ed.). سالنامه آماری سینمای ایران سال ۱۳۸۹ [2010–2011 Statistical Yearbook of the Cinema of Iran] (PDF) (Report) (in Persian). Iranian Organization of Cinema and Audiovisual Affairs. Archived from the original (PDF) on 5 October 2019.
- Fathi, Zohreh; Khamoushi, Pantea (2018d). Sadreddini, Alireza (ed.). سالنامه آماری سینمای ایران سال ۱۳۹۰ [2011–2012 Statistical Yearbook of the Cinema of Iran] (PDF) (Report) (in Persian). Iranian Organization of Cinema and Audiovisual Affairs. Archived from the original (PDF) on 7 October 2019.
- Fathi, Zohreh; Khamoushi, Pantea (2018e). Sadreddini, Alireza (ed.). سالنامه آماری سینمای ایران سال ۱۳۹۱ [2012–2013 Statistical Yearbook of the Cinema of Iran] (PDF) (Report) (in Persian). Iranian Organization of Cinema and Audiovisual Affairs. Archived from the original (PDF) on 7 October 2019.
- Fathi, Zohreh; Khamoushi, Pantea (2018f). Sadreddini, Alireza (ed.). سالنامه آماری سینمای ایران سال ۱۳۹۲ [2013–2014 Statistical Yearbook of the Cinema of Iran] (PDF) (Report) (in Persian). Iranian Organization of Cinema and Audiovisual Affairs. Archived from the original (PDF) on 25 June 2020.
- Fathi, Zohreh; Khamoushi, Pantea (2018g). Sadreddini, Alireza (ed.). سالنامه آماری سینمای ایران سال ۱۳۹۳ [2014–2015 Statistical Yearbook of the Cinema of Iran] (PDF) (Report) (in Persian). Iranian Organization of Cinema and Audiovisual Affairs. Archived from the original (PDF) on 28 June 2020.
- Fathi, Zohreh; Khamoushi, Pantea (2018h). Sadreddini, Alireza (ed.). سالنامه آماری سینمای ایران سال ۱۳۹۴ [2015–2016 Statistical Yearbook of the Cinema of Iran] (PDF) (Report) (in Persian). Iranian Organization of Cinema and Audiovisual Affairs. Archived from the original (PDF) on 25 June 2020.
- Fathi, Zohreh; Khamoushi, Pantea (2018i). Sadreddini, Alireza (ed.). سالنامه آماری سینمای ایران سال ۱۳۹۵ [2016–2017 Statistical Yearbook of the Cinema of Iran] (PDF) (Report) (in Persian). Iranian Organization of Cinema and Audiovisual Affairs. Archived from the original (PDF) on 27 June 2020.
- Fathi, Zohreh; Khamoushi, Pantea (2018j). Sadreddini, Alireza (ed.). سالنامه آماری سینمای ایران سال ۱۳۹۶ [2017–2018 Statistical Yearbook of the Cinema of Iran] (PDF) (Report) (in Persian). Iranian Organization of Cinema and Audiovisual Affairs. Archived from the original (PDF) on 28 June 2020.
- Fathi, Zohreh; Khamoushi, Pantea (2019). Sadreddini, Alireza (ed.). سالنامه آماری سینمای ایران سال ۱۳۹۷ [2018–2019 Statistical Yearbook of the Cinema of Iran] (PDF) (Report) (in Persian). Iranian Organization of Cinema and Audiovisual Affairs. Archived from the original (PDF) on 28 June 2020.
- Fathi, Zohreh; Khamoushi, Pantea (2020). Sadreddini, Alireza (ed.). سالنامه آماری سینمای ایران سال ۱۳۹۸ [2019–2020 Statistical Yearbook of the Cinema of Iran] (PDF) (Report) (in Persian). Iranian Organization of Cinema and Audiovisual Affairs.
