= Behnaz Jafari =

Iranian actress (born 1975)

- بهناز جعفری
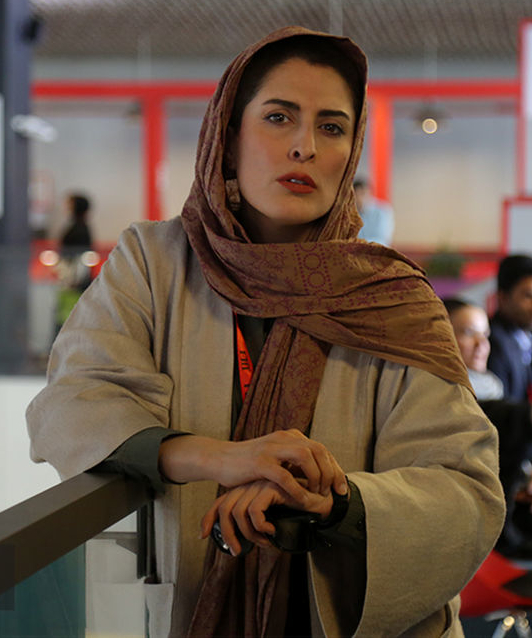
- Jafari at 36th Fajr Film Festival, 2018
- Born: August 16, 1975 (age 50); Tehran, Iran
- Education: Azad University - Dramatic Literature
- Occupation: Actress
- Years active: 1995–present

Behnaz Jafari (Persian: بهناز جعفری; born 16 August 1975, in Tehran) is an Iranian actress.

== Biography ==
Jafari was born in Tehran and graduated with a bachelor's degree in dramatic literature from the Islamic Azad University.

Jafari first learned acting by attending classes at the School of Art and Literature for Children and Adolescents, where she studied under the guidance of Roya Teymorian, Farideh Sepah-Mansour, and Golab Adineh. She made her theater debut in 1993 with the play "The Snake King," directed by Golab Adineh.

Jafari made her screen debut in 1995 in the film The Blue Veiled, directed by Rakhshan Bani-Etemad. In 1996 she made her television debut in the series Dust of Light. Jafari also explored radio dramas as an actress for a period of time.

Jafari won the Crystal Simorgh for Best Supporting Actress for her role in A House Built on Water (2001).

Jafari's performance in the film A House on Water, directed by Bahman Farmanara, earned her the Crystal Simorgh for Best Supporting Actress at the 20th Fajr Film Festival.

== Illness ==
Since March 2015, after experiencing symptoms and undergoing medical evaluation, Behnaz Jafari has been diagnosed with multiple sclerosis (MS).

== Filmography ==
=== Film and television ===
- 2019 - Yalda, a Night for Forgiveness
- 2019 - Tehran: City of Love
- 2018 - 3 Faces
- 2017 - Wander About Me
- 2017 - Nafas (TV series)
- 2017 - The Girl's House
- 2016 - Ferris wheel (TV series)
- 2012 - The President's Cell Phone
- 2012 - A Respected Family
- 2011 - The Recall (TV series)
- 2011 - Havalie Otoban
- 2010-2011 Mokhtarnameh (TV series) as Marieh
- 2010 Beetle (Soosk), (short) as Marjan
- 2008 Zamani baraye doust dashtan
- 2008 - Shirin as herself
- 2006 The Gaze
- 2006 From Afar as Mehran's Wife
- 2005 Chand tare mu
- 2005 Wake Up, Arezu!
- 2004 Kandaloos Gardens
- 2003 Tehran 7:00 a.m.
- 2003 A House Built on Water (release year at Irani cinemas)
- 2002 Negin as Laleh
- 2001 Ab va Atash as Seema
- 2000 Blackboards as Halaleh
- 1999 Eshghe Taher
- 1995 The Blue Veiled

=== Home video ===
Year	Title	Role	Director	Notes
2016	Golden Tooth	Tala	Davood Mirbagheri	distributed in Video CD
2021	Once Upon a Time in Iran	rana	Tina Pakravan	distributed by Namava
2021	Blue Nissan	pari	Manochehr Hadi	distributed by Filimo

== Awards ==
- Crystal Simorgh for Best Supporting Actress for her role in A House Built on Water
- Honorary diploma for Best Actress from the 30th Fajr International Film Festival for her role in The President's Cell Phone
- The best Actress from the 4th Jam-Jam TV film Festival.
