= For the Sake of Mahdi =

- For the Sake of Mahdi poster
- Directed by: Hossein Shahabi
- Written by: Hossein Shahabi
- Produced by: Hossein Shahabi
- Starring: Mahdi Bakhtyar Nejhad; Negin Motazedi
- Cinematography: Hossein Shahabi
- Edited by: siavash Shahabi
- Music by: Hossein Shahabi
- Production company: Baran Film House
- Distributed by: Pars Universal Vision
- Release date: 2012 (Iran)
- Running time: 110 minutes
- Country: Iran
- Language: Persian

For the Sake of Mahdi (Persian: بخاطر مهدي) is a 2012 Iranian social drama film written, directed, and produced by Hossein Shahabi (Persian: حسین شهابی).

== Background ==
Release of the film was banned for Seven years issued by the Government of Iran for screening film festivals.

== Starring ==
- Mahdi Bakhtyar Nejhad
- Negin Motazedi
- Maryam Rohani
- Iraj Moghimi
- Mohammad Karhemmat
- Mohammad Akbari
- Ahmad Shahabi
- Bahareh Ansari
- Ali Habibpoor
