= Broth Soup =

- Movie poster for Broth Soup
- Persian: آش نذري
- Directed by: Hossein Shahabi
- Written by: Hossein Shahabi
- Produced by: Kobra Ghasemi
- Starring: Ali Piroozi; Rahman Ghorbani; Hashem Saeedi; Nader Golrokh; Sadegh Sharifian
- Cinematography: Kazem Srvar
- Edited by: Hossein Shahabi
- Music by: Hossein Shahabi
- Production company: Kish Studio
- Distributed by: Baran Film House
- Release date: 2000
- Running time: 80 minutes
- Country: Iran
- Language: Persian

Broth Soup (Persian: آش نذری) is a 2000 Iranian film written and directed by Hossein Shahabi (Persian: حسین شهابی).

== Starring ==
- Ali Piroozi
- Rahman Ghorbani
- Hashem Saeedi
- Nader Golrokh
- Sadegh Sharifian
- Ahmad Abbasi

== Cast ==
- Producer: Kobra Ghasemi
- Production manager: Mnsour Sharifian
- Cinematography: Kazem Srvar
- Sound recorder: Ali Kohzad
- Costume designer: Fariba Mortazavi
- Make up: Sanaz Shahin
- Music: Hossein Shahabi
- Production: Kish TV
