= Alireza Kamali (actor) =

Iranian actor (born 1980)

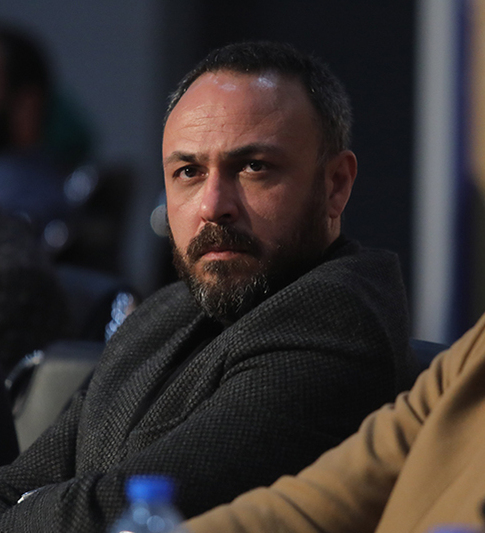
- Kamali at the 2020 Fajr Film Festival
- Born: May 17, 1980 (age 46); Tehran, Iran
- Education: University of Tehran
- Occupation: Actor
- Years active: 2000–present

Alireza Kamalinezhad (Persian: علیرضا کمالی‌نژاد; born May 17, 1980) is an Iranian actor. He is best known for his roles in Breath (2017), The Moment of Twilight (2019), and Abadan Eleven 60 (2020). Kamali gained wide recognition and critical acclaim after portraying Reza Parvaneh in the web series The Lion Skin (2022–2023) and earned a Hafez Award for his performance.

== Filmography ==
=== Film ===
Year	Title	Role	Director	Notes	Ref(s)
2005	Childish War		Abolghasem Talebi		
2007	End of the Road		Afsaneh Monadi		
2007	Empty Hands		Abolghasem Talebi		
2010	The Kingdom of Solomon	Adonijah	Shahriar Bahrani		
2011	Devil's Throat		Hamid Bahmani		
2011	Here Is Another City		Ahmad Reza Garshasbi		
2013	Eagle of the Desert	Sheibeh	Mehrdad Khoshbakht		
2014	Draft	Bahman	Ali Jenab	Direct-to-video	
2015	A Baby with Red Socks		Khodadad Jalali		
2016	Three Fish		Hamid Reza Ghorbani	Direct-to-video	
2016	A House on 41st Street	Morteza	Hamid Reza Ghorbani		
2016	Rabidity	Siavash	Amir Ahmad Ansari		
2016	Glass Meeting		Yousef Hatamikia	Short film	
2017	Blockage	Ghasem's friend	Mohsen Gharaee		
2017	House of Paper		Mehdi Sabaghzadeh		
2019	Reverse	Peyman	Poulad Kimiayi		
2019	Symphony No. 9	Cyrus the Great	Mohammad Reza Honarmand		
2019	In Silence	Farid	Zharzh Hashemzadeh	Completed in 2016	
2019	Kingslayer	Adel	Vahid Amirkhani		
2019	Seven and a Half	Salar	Navid Mahmoudi	Nahid episode	
2020	Abadan Eleven 60	Bahman	Mehrdad Khoshbakht		
2021	Sniper	Emad	Ali Ghafari		
2022	Summer with Hope	Sa'adi	Sadaf Foroughi		
2022	Beyond the Wall	Karimi	Vahid Jalilvand		
2025	Moses the Kalimullah: At Dawn	Amram	Ebrahim Hatamikia		
2026	Falling House		Mohsen Gharaee		
TBA	Shahin		Salar Tehrani	Completed	

=== Web ===
Year	Title	Role	Director	Platform	Ref(s)
2012	Frozen Heart	Masoud	Mohammad Hossein Latifi	Namava	
2021	Them		Mehdi Aghajani	Filmnet	
2022–2023	The Lion Skin	Reza Abdollahi (Parvaneh)	Jamshid Mahmoudi	Filmnet	
2024	The Loser	Hamed Kiani	Amin Hosseinpour	Filimo	
TBA	Brave		Jamshid Mahmoudi	Filmnet	

=== Television ===
Year	Title	Role	Director	Network	Notes	Ref(s)
2006	Nargess	Esmail	Sirous Moghaddam	IRIB TV3	TV series	
2012–2013	Flying Passion		Yadollah Samadi	IRIB TV1	TV series	
2017	Breath	Rouzbeh	Jalil Saman	IRIB TV3	TV series	
2019	The Moment of Twilight	Ehsan Vahdat	Homayoun As'adian	IRIB TV3	TV series	
2019	Rain	Yarmohammad Sistani	Ahmad Kavari	IRIB TV3	TV series	

== Awards and nominations ==
Name of the award ceremony, year presented, category, nominee of the award, and the result of the nomination
Award	Year	Category	Nominated Work	Result	Ref(s)
Hafez Awards	2018	Best Actor – Television Series Drama	Breath	Nominated	
Hafez Awards	2023	Best Actor – Television Series Drama	The Lion Skin	Won	
