= Mohsen Yeganeh =

Iranian singer and musician (born 1985)

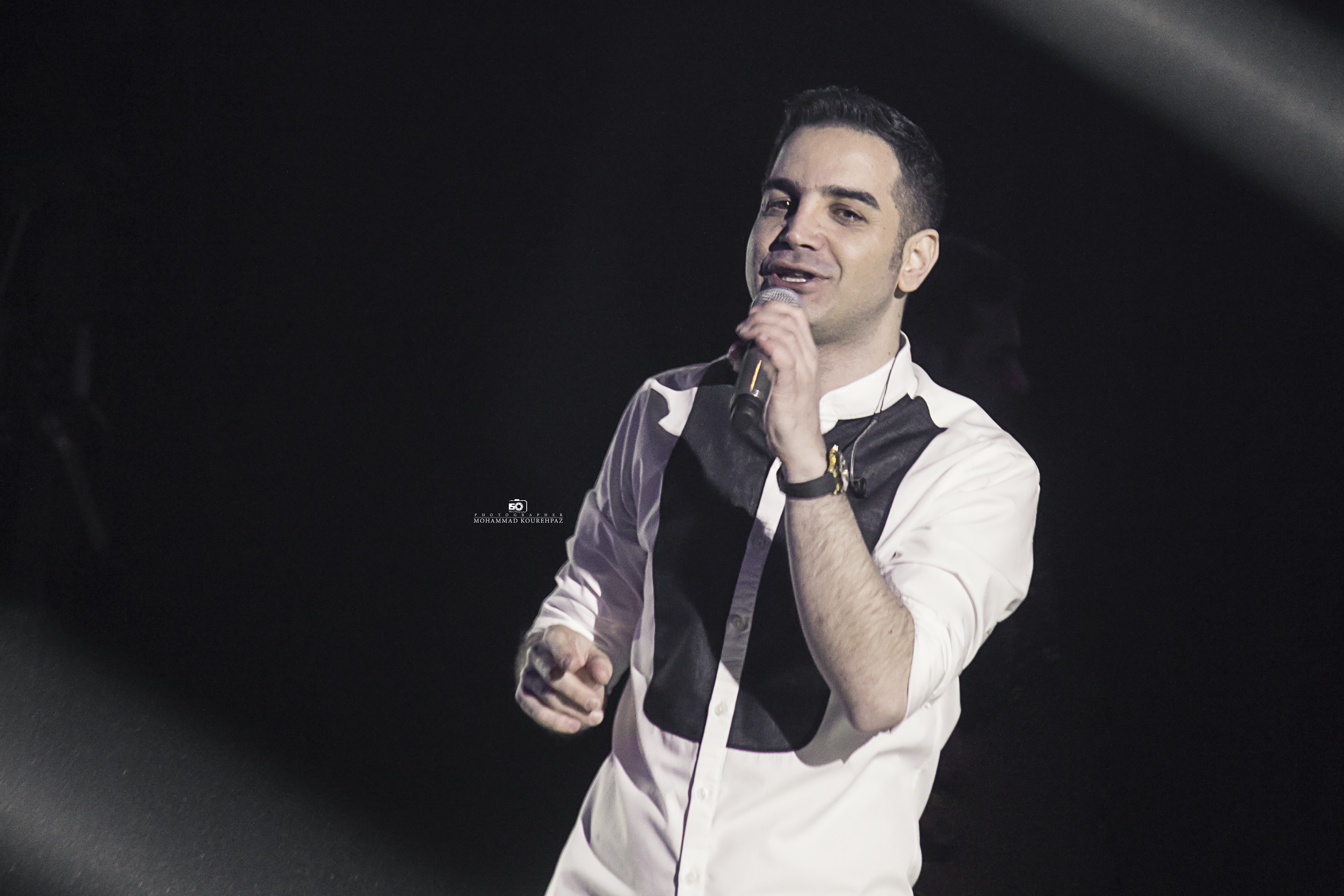
- Yeganeh in 2022
- Born: May 13, 1985 (age 41); Gonbad-e Kavus, Golestan, Iran
- Occupation: Singer
- Musical career
- Genres: Persian Pop
- Instruments: Vocals; guitar; piano; keyboard
- Years active: 2004–present
- Website: www.mohsen-yeganeh.net

Mohsen Yeganeh (Persian: محسن یگانه; born May 13, 1985) is an Iranian singer, songwriter, composer, arranger, musician, and music producer. He has also written songs, composed, and arranged music for other artists, including Mohammad Esfahani, Ayşegül Coşkun, and Ali Lohrasbi, among others.

Yeganeh is widely regarded as one of Iran's leading pop music artists. He is among the few singers who rose to fame in the 2000s and has remained one of the most prominent and popular Iranian artists despite changes in the music industry over the years.

== Early life ==
Mohsen Yeganeh was born on 13 May 1985 in Gonbad-e Kavus, Iran. He studied Industrial Engineering with a focus on Industrial Production at the Islamic Azad University, South Tehran Branch, but withdrew after completing six semesters due to his demanding music career. He is the third child or second-to-last in his family, with two older sisters who are a physician and a dentist, respectively. His father, Mohammadreza Yeganeh, was a martyr of the Iran-Iraq War, and his mother is a university professor.

Yeganeh began his musical journey with the guitar. His interest in music was sparked by chance when he listened to the instrumental track "Gol-e Gandom" from Shadmehr Aghili's album Bahar-e Man, which inspired his passion for pop music and led him to learn the guitar. He taught himself to play without formal instruction, despite opposition from his family, which prevented him from pursuing academic guitar training. Nevertheless, Yeganeh persisted and continued to develop his guitar skills.

== Career ==
Mohsen Yeganeh's first song, "Nashkan Delamo," was performed alongside Mohsen Chavoshi and Hamed Hakan, with lyrics and music by Yeganeh and arrangement by Chavoshi. His debut album, Sal-e Kabiseh (Leap Year), was released unofficially. Following this, Yeganeh focused on releasing singles, many of which were later compiled into albums to avoid scattered distribution. For several years, he was considered an unauthorized singer until he decided to obtain a permit from the Ministry of Culture and Islamic Guidance. After a period of silence and various challenges, he released his first official album, Nafashaye Bi Hadaf (Aimless Breaths), on 8 July 2008.

After a two-year hiatus following his debut official album, Yeganeh spent much of his time performing concerts. He devoted considerable effort to his second album, Rag-e Khab (Deep Sleep), which was released in August 2010. The song "Sokoot" (Silence) from this album gained widespread acclaim and was recognized as the most popular song of 2010 in Iran.

His next album, Hobab (Bubble), was released two years later in October 2012, featuring 14 tracks. Yeganeh initially described Hobab as his final album, and in a surprising statement, he declared, "This is my last album." However, following requests from his fans, he reconsidered and promised to begin working on a new album after releasing several singles. His fourth album, Negahe Man (My Gaze), was released on 10 May 2015.

In 2012, Yeganeh performed at a National Unity and Cohesion Youth Conference in the presence of then-President Mahmoud Ahmadinejad, who awarded him a certificate of appreciation. The event sparked considerable interest online after images and videos were shared. Yeganeh later said in an interview that the encounter with Ahmadinejad was unexpected.

Yeganeh has written the lyrics for most of his songs and has also composed and arranged music for artists such as Mohammad Esfahani, Ali Lohrasbi, and others.

In March 2016, Yeganeh released the single "Behet Ghol Midam" (I Promise You), which was met with significant acclaim. A music video for the song, recorded during a concert on 2 August 2016, was released in January 2017. The video garnered widespread attention both domestically and internationally, achieving over 250 million views and becoming the most-watched Persian-language music video on YouTube.

During a 2022 concert in Bushehr, Yeganeh abruptly canceled his performance in the second session, citing vocal strain. Having completed the first session without issue, he performed a few songs in the second, including "Behet Ghol Midam," before addressing the audience: "I don’t know what words to use to apologize that would be worthy of you. It’s been a long time since I’ve canceled a concert. Even five minutes before going on stage, I didn’t think this would happen. I’m ashamed; I don’t know what to say. My voice is strained, and it’s not worthy of your ears." The incident received significant attention in the media and on social platforms.

== Awards and honors ==
- Winner of the Best Live Pop Music Performance Award (shared with Ehsan Khajehamiri), Expert Category, at the First Annual Musicema Awards in 2012.
- Recipient of the Nokia Theatre L.A. Live Award and recognition as one of the distinguished figures of the venue.
- Winner of the Best Songwriter Award at the Second Afshin Yadollahi Song Award Ceremony in 2018.
- Holder of the Record for the Most-Viewed Iranian Music Video on YouTube with the song "Behet Ghol Midam" (I Promise You) among artists based in Iran.
- Recognized as the Top Pop Music Figure by Runa Magazine in 2010.

== Discography ==
Official Albums
No.	Album	Release date
1	Sal-e Kabiseh	2004–05
2	Nafas-haye Bi-hadaf	2008
3	Rag-e Khab	2010
4	Hobab	2012
5	Negah-e Man	2015

Singles
English	Persian
I don't have you	ندارمت
Selfish	خودخواه
Your hair	موهات
Gray city	شهر خاکستری
It's Late	دیره
I'll find out	دریابم
the wall	دیوار
Thoughts of you	فکر تو
Passing	عبور
After you	بعد تو
I'll be with you [acoustic version]	پا به پای تو [نسخۀ آکوستیک]
I'll be with you [electronic version]	پا به پای تو [نسخۀ الکترونیک]
Dependency	وابستگی
Desert	کویر
Whatever You Want	هرچی تو بخوای
I Promise You	بهت قول می‌دم
You Disappoint Me	نا امیدم می‌کنی
Sacrifice [Remix By : Mehran Abbasi]	[فداکاری [ریمیکس : مهران عباسی
Easter each year	عید هر سال
I believe [remix: puzzle group]	باور کنم [ریمیکس : گروه پازل]
Man	مرد
Laugh Again	بازم بخند
Me	من
Sleeping Pills	قرصای خواب آور
Streets	خیابونا
I'm Tired	خستم
Today Is My Birthday	امروز تولد منه
A Week Before Norouz	یه هفته به عید
I Love You (Remix by: Puzzle Band)	دوست دارم [ریمیکس : گروه پازل]
Vicious	تقاص
Do not go around yourself	دور خودت نچرخ
[Do not be] Remix: Mehran Abbasi	[نباشی [ریمیکس : مهران عباسی
I miss you so much	خیلی دلم ازت پره
Silence [Remix By : Mehran Abbasi]	سکوت [ریمیکس : مهران عباسی]
I'm afraid	میترسم
Panic	هراس
The Hope that I Won't Lose	امیدی که نمی بازم
I wish	کاش
Frozen Heart	قلب یخی
Lie	یالان
Sacrifice	فداکاری
Sky Isn't Always Cloudy	آسمان همیشه ابری نیست
Vast	درندشت

== See also ==
- Persian pop music
