= Ghost (1998 film) =

- Movie Poster
- Directed by: Hossein Shahabi
- Written by: Hossein Shahabi
- Produced by: Hossein Shahabi
- Starring: Bahar Karimzadeh; Amir Mandavi; Rahim Fallah; Karim Nobakht; Vahid Azadi
- Cinematography: Hamid Angaji
- Edited by: Hossein Shahabi
- Music by: Hossein Shahabi
- Production company: Baran film house
- Distributed by: Baran Film House
- Release date: 1998
- Running time: 90 minutes
- Country: Iran
- Language: Persian

Ghost (Persian: شبح) is a 1998 Iranian drama film written and directed by Hossein Shahabi (Persian: حسین شهابی)

== Starring ==
- Bahar Karimzadeh
- Amir Mandavi
- Rahim Fallah
- Karim Nobakht
- Mohammad Baghban
- Vahid Azadi
- Karim Novin

== Crew ==
- cinematography: Hamid Angaji
- Sound Recorder: Souroosh Kevan
- Costume Designer: Nina Tabrizi
- Makeup designer: Mohammad Baghban
- Music: Hossein Shahabi
- Production manager: karim Nobakht
- producer: Hossein Shahabi
- produced in Baran film house iran 1998
