= Tunnel 18 =

- تونل ۱۸
- Directed by: Hossein Shahabi
- Written by: Hossein Shahabi
- Produced by: Hossein Shahabi
- Starring: Ali osivand; Reza Naji; Bahar Karimzadeh; Karim Nobakht; Mnsoor Sedaghat
- Cinematography: Hamid Angaji
- Edited by: Hossein Shahabi
- Music by: Hossein Shahabi
- Production company: Baran film house
- Distributed by: Baran Film House
- Release date: 1997
- Running time: 120 minutes
- Country: Iran
- Language: Persian

Tunnel 18 (Persian: تونل ۱۸) is a 1997 Iranian Historical drama film written and directed by Hossein Shahabi.

== Starring ==
- Ali Osivand
- Reza Naji
- Bahar Karimzadeh
- Karim Nobakht
- Abdolsamad Jodeyri
- Akram Alamdar
- Mansoor Sedaghat

== Crew ==
- cinematography: Hamid Angaji
- Sound Recorder:Saman Alizadeh
- Costume Designer: Reza Hasanzadeh
- Makeup designer: Navid Farahmarzi
- Music: Hossein Shahabi
- Assistsnts Director: Mohammad Ravandi - Sanaz Shakoori
- Production manager: karim Nobakht
- producer: Hossein Shahabi
- produced in Baran film house Iran 1997
