= A Respected Family =

A Respectable Family یک خانواده محترم
- Directed by: Massoud Bakhshi
- Produced by: Kazem Masoumi
- Starring: Babak Hamidian Mehrdad Sedighian Mehran Ahmadi Ahu Kheradmand Behnaz Jafari Mehrdad Ziyaei
- Cinematography: Mehdi Jafari
- Release date: 2012
- Running time: 90 minutes
- Countries: Iran; France
- Language: Persian

A Respectable Family (Persian: یک خانواده محترم) is a 2012 Iranian movie directed by Massoud Bakhshi. The story of the film is about an Iranian scholar in Europe who is visiting his mother back in Iran while lecturing a course. This movie has a very critical view of Iranian society showing the corruptions in the highest level of administrative, judicial, and paramilitary groups of Iranian government.

== Plot ==
Arash is an Iranian scholar in Europe who is visiting his mother in Shiraz. He is also lecturing a course in sociology at the same time. His parents are divorced long time ago and he hasn't visited his father who is living in Tehran for a very long time, until suddenly his nephew visits him and informs him of his father's hospitalization in Tehran and persuades him to visit his father. At the same time due to some unexpected problems he cannot get his passport to leave the country on time. While Arash is going to Tehran is reviewing his memories of bad treatment with his father, and the way his mother and brother were also treated in the worse situation. He also remembers the memories of his brother who fled from home due his father's misbehavior. Later on his brother joined to the Iranian volunteer forces in Iran-Iraq war and soon after got killed in the war.

His father dies shortly after Arash's visit in Tehran. After death of his father, Arash faces with newer problems about the family heritages.

== Critics ==
Inside Iran the movie could not get the permission for screening. The semi official news agency Fars News criticized the movie a betrayal and called the producer and director of the movie traitors.
