= The Bright Day =

- movie poster
- Directed by: Hossein Shahabi
- Written by: Hossein Shahabi
- Produced by: Hossein Shahabi
- Starring: Pantea Bahram; Ronak Yoonesi; Mehran Ahmadi; Soudabeh Beizaee
- Cinematography: Mohammadreza Sokoot
- Edited by: Shima Monfared
- Music by: Hossein Shahabi
- Production company: Khane Film Baran
- Distributed by: Baran Film House
- Release date: 20 September 2013 (Iran)
- Running time: 90 minutes
- Country: Iran
- Language: Persian
- Box office: 2115000$

The Bright Day (Persian: روز روشن) is a 2013 Iranian social drama film directed by Hossein Shahabi.

It is his debut feature film which was very well received by Iranian film critics and audiences of the 31st Fajr Film Festival of Tehran in February 2013. The film also won the Special Jury Prize of 28th Mar del Plata International Film Festival in Argentina and it was shown on the 24th Annual Festival of Films from Iran in Chicago. It also won Silver Pheasant Award and a cash prize for The Best Debut Director of the 19th International Film Festival of Kerala, India

== Plot ==
Roshan is a teacher in a kindergarten school. One of her student’s father is accused of unintentional homicide. There were seven witnesses, who had seen the incident, but no one intends to tell the whole truth because of the slain’s family power and the influence. If the witnesses don’t tell the truth, the accused will be facing retaliation and the death penalty. Roshan intends to save his life by tracking down a witness who will be willing to testify the truth in court.

== Production ==
- Producer: Hossein Shahabi
- Production manager: bahareh ansari
- Procurement Manager:Mohammad karhemmat
- produced in Baran Film House Iran 2014

== Starring ==
- Pantea Bahram
- Ronak Yoonesi
- Soudabeh Beizaee
- Mehran Ahmadi
- Amir Karbalaeezadeh
- Alireza Ostadi
- Bahram Behbahani
- Mohammadreza Alimardani
- Vahid Aghapoor
- Amir Delavari
- Parya Ebrahimi

== Crew ==
- Director Of Photography:Mohammadreza Sokoot
- Composer: Hossein Shahabi
- Sound recorder: Babak Ardalan
- Edit:Shima Monfared - Hossein Eyvazi
- Costume Designer:Hossein Shahabi
- Director of Consulting: Bahareh Ansari
- Assistsnts Director: Mahdi Tavakkoli - Siavash Shahabi
- Pianist: Babk Parsian

== Awards and Screenings ==
1. won Diploma award the best screenplay of the 31st Fajr International Film Festival. Iran (2013)
2. won Diploma award the best Actress of the 31st Fajr International Film Festival. Iran (2013)
3. Candidate a Crystal Simorgh award at 31st Fajr International Film Festival for best first film (2013)
4. Candidate a Crystal simorgh award for Best Actor at 31st Fajr International Film Festival (2013)
5. Candidate a Crystal simorgh award for Best Sound recorder at 31st Fajr International Film Festival (2013)
6. Candidate a Crystal simorgh award for Best Graphic Design at 31st Fajr International Film Festival (2013)
7. win Special Mention of the Jury-at 28th international film festival mar del plata (2014)
8. Companies at 28th Film Festival in Boston America (2014)
9. Companies at 21 Film Festival in Houston America (2014)
10. Companies at 18 Film Festival in Washington DC America (2014)
11. Companies at the Iranian films festival in America Rice University (2014)
12. Companies at the Iranian films festival in America The Los Angeles Museum of Art (2014)
13. Companies at the Iranian films festival in America UCLA University for the movie "the bright day" (2014)
14. Companies at the 3rd Persian International Film Festival Sydney, Australia for the movie "the bright day" (2014)
15. Silver Pheasant Award and a cash prize for best director's first film of the 19th International Film Festival of Kerala, India (2014)
16. Companies at the 11th international film festival of zurich (2015)
