= Wars and Treasure =

- poster movie
- Persian: جنگ و گنج
- Directed by: Hossein Shahabi
- Written by: Hossein Shahabi
- Produced by: Hossein Shahabi
- Starring: Fariba mortazavi; rasool honarmand; parvin solymani; Ali Habibpoor
- Cinematography: bahman znoozi
- Edited by: Hossein Shahabi
- Music by: hossein shahabi
- Production company: Rain Home Movie
- Distributed by: baran film house
- Release date: 2000
- Running time: 100 minutes
- Country: Iran
- Language: Persian

Wars and Treasure (Persian: جنگ و گنج) is a 2000 Iranian drama film directed by Hossein Shahabi (Persian: حسین شهابی)

== Background ==
Release of the film is banned for 15 years issued by the Government of Iran for screening film festivals.

== Starring ==
- Fariba Mortazavi
- Rasool Honarmand
- Parvin Solymani
- Ali Habibpoor
- Manoochehr Farhang
- Mohammad Taheri Azar
- Yaser Rakh
- Arezoo Kheyroshar
- Farrokhe Yazdanfar

== Cast ==
- Director Of Photography: Bahman Zonoozi
- Sound Recorder: karim esbati
- Editor:Hossein Shahabi
- Music: Hossein Shahabi
- Costume Designer:Hossein Shahabi
- family Of Consulting: Fariba Poursaberi
- Planner: Mohammad Taheri Azar
- Assistsnts Director: Siavash Shahabi - Ahmad Shahabi
