= Any Day Now (2020 film) =

2020 film by Hamy Ramezan

- Film poster
- Finnish: Ensilumi
- Directed by: Hamy Ramezan
- Written by: Hamy Ramezan; Antti Rautava
- Produced by: Emilia Falcon; Jussi Rantamäki
- Starring: Shahab Hosseini; Aran-Sina Keshvari; Shabnam Ghorbani; Kimiya Eskandari
- Edited by: Joona Louhivuori
- Music by: Tuomas Nikkinen
- Production company: Aamu Film Company
- Distributed by: Nordisk Film
- Release date: 23 September 2020 (Helsinki)
- Running time: 82 minutes
- Country: Finland
- Languages: Finnish; Persian; English
- Budget: €1,200,000

Any Day Now (also known as The Oasis of Now; Finnish: Ensilumi, lit. 'First snow') is a 2020 Finnish drama film written and directed by Hamy Ramezan. The film tells story about an Iranian immigrant's family living in Finland and the family's constant fear of obtaining a negative residence permit. The film features Shahab Hosseini and Laura Birn, among others.

== Premise ==
The Iranian Mehdipours have been living in a refugee center in Finland for a while now. As the 13-year-old Ramin is enjoying his school holidays, the family receives a negative decision on their asylum application. After filing the last possible appeal, the Mehdipours try to continue with their everyday lives and keep a positive attitude despite the looming danger of deportation. Ramin starts the new school year in which every moment will be more precious than ever.

== Cast ==
- Shahab Hosseini
- Aran-Sina Keshvari
- Shabnam Ghorbani
- Kimiya Eskandari
- Laura Birn
- Niilo Airas
- Lumi Barrois
- Muhammed Cangore
- Kristiina Halkola
- Eero Melasniemi
- Vilho Rönkkönen

== Production ==
The film's Mehdipour family is based on the director Hamy Ramezan's own experiences 30 years ago, when his own family came to Finland to escape the war between Iran and Iraq. The 2015 refugee flow to Europe and the ensuing public debate haunted Ramezan, and in those mental landscapes the young director set about preparing his first feature film. The first versions of the manuscript were full of nightmares and dark compared to what ended up in the final version.

== Awards and nominees ==
Year	Award	Category	Nominated	Result
2021	11th Beijing International Film Festival	Tiantan Award for Best Film	Hamy Ramezan	Nominated
2021	11th Beijing International Film Festival	Tiantan Award for Best Supporting Actor	Shahab Hosseini	Won
2021	11th Beijing International Film Festival	Tiantan Award for Best Music	Tuomas Nikkinen	Won
2021	Berlin International Film Festival	Crystal Bear	Hamy Ramezan	Nominated
2021	Molodist International Film Festival	Scythian Deer	Hamy Ramezan	Nominated
2021	Jussi Awards	Best Film	Jussi Rantamäki Emilia Haukka; Elokuvayhtiö Oy Aamu	Nominated
2021	Jussi Awards	Best Direction	Hamy Ramezan	Nominated
2021	Jussi Awards	Best Leading Actor	Shahab Hosseini	Won
2021	Jussi Awards	Best Screenplay	Hamy Ramezan	Nominated
2021	Jussi Awards	Best Cinematography	Arsen Sarkisiants	Nominated
2021	Jussi Awards	Best Sound Design	Svante Colérus	Nominated
2021	Kyiv International Film Festival "Molodist"	Scythian Deer	Hamy Ramezan	Nominated
