= Majnoon (film) =

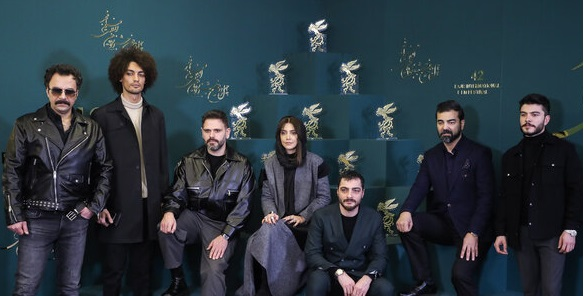
- Cast of Majnoon
- Directed by: Mehdi Shamohammadi
- Written by: Alireza Mohsooli
- Based on: The story of the life of Mehdi Zeinoddin
- Produced by: Abbas Naderan
- Edited by: Hamid Najafi Rad
- Music by: Majid Entezami
- Production company: Owj
- Release date: 2024 (Fajr)
- Country: Iran
- Language: Persian

Majnoon (Persian: مجنون) is an Iranian film directed by Mehdi Shamohammadi and produced by Abbas Naderan, which tells the story of the life of Mehdi Zeinoddin and was produced in 1402 (2024). This film is a product of the Owj Media Art Organization and was screened at the 42nd Fajr Film Festival.

== Synopsis ==
This film depicts the bravery of Mehdi and Majid Zeinoddin in the Iran–Iraq War in the 17th Division of Ali ibn Abi Talib on Majnoon Island and the Khyber operations. The film was shot in Abadan. Sajjad Babaei plays the role of Mehdi Zeinoddin in this film.

== Cast and involved individuals ==
Including:

- Sajjad Babaei,
- Behzad Khalaj,
- Hesam Manzour,
- Shabnam Ghorbani,
- Mohammad Rashno,
- Seyyed Mehdi Hosseini,
- Afshin Hassanloo and Mohammad Rasoul Safari.

Other main involved individuals of this film are as follows:

Writer: Alireza Mohsooli, Director of Photography: Saeed Barati, Composer: Majid Entezami, Set Designer: Behzad Jafari Tadi, Costume Designer: Behzad Aghabeigi, Makeup Artist: Shahram Khalaj, Editor: Hamid Najafi Rad, Supervising Director and Planner: Reza Keshavarzi, Sound Recordist: Hadi Saed-Mohkam, Sound Design and Mixing: Alireza Alavian, Photographer: Hassan Shojaei, Special Field Effects: Iman Karamian, Special Visual Effects: Kamyar Shafipour, Logo Designer: Mojtaba Hassanzadeh.

== Awards ==
Out of 33 films screened at the 42nd Fajr Film Festival, the film "Majnoon" became the most honored film of the festival, winning four Crystal Simorghs. The film won the Crystal Simorgh in the following categories:

- Crystal Simorgh for Best Music to Majid Entezami
- Crystal Simorgh for Best Supporting Actor to Behzad Khalaj
- Crystal Simorgh for Best Supporting Actress to Shabnam Ghorbani
- Crystal Simorgh for Best Film
