= Blade and Termeh =

2019 film directed by Kiumars Pourahmad

- Film poster
- Directed by: Kiumars Pourahmad
- Written by: Kiumars Pourahmad
- Produced by: Ali Ghaemmaghami
- Starring: Diba Zahedi; Pejman Bazeghi; Mehran Rajabi; Laleh Eskandari; Hooman Barghnavard
- Cinematography: Alireza Zarrindast
- Edited by: Khashayar Movahedian
- Music by: Fardin Khalaatbari
- Release date: February 2019 (Fajr Film Festival)
- Country: Iran
- Language: Persian

Blade and Termeh (Persian: تیغ و ترمه) is a 2019 Iranian film written and directed by Kiumars Pourahmad. The film premiered at the 37th Fajr Film Festival.

== Storyline ==
Termeh (Diba Zahedi) is a young girl who lost her father as a child and after her father died, her mother left her and went to United States. So during this time Jahan (Hooman Barghnavard) has kept the Termeh. Now, after years, Leili has returned to Iran to take Termeh with her to the United States.In the meantime, the secrets of the past are revealed for Termeh...

== Cast ==
- Diba Zahedi as Termeh
- Pejman Bazeghi as Amir
- Mehran Rajabi as Saed
- Laleh Eskandari as Leili (Mother of Termeh)
- Hooman Barghnavard as Jahan
- Korosh Soleimani as Payam (Father of Termeh)
- Sharareh Ranjbar as Gelareh
- Mitra Ghorbani as Mitra
- Simon Simonian as Airport Security
- Avisa Sajjadi as Termeh's childhood
- Faranak Koshafar
- Pedram Abdan
- Navid Kohfallah
- Miad Abedizadeh
