= 11th Beijing International Film Festival =

Film festival in Beijing China in 2021

- Official poster
- Opening film: The Battle at Lake Changjin
- Closing film: Saturday Fiction by Lou Ye
- Location: Yanqi Lake, Huairou District, Beijing, China
- Founded: 2011
- Awards: Tiantan Award; Best Feature Film: Beyond The Skies; Best Director: Andrey Zaytsev for A Siege Diary
- Hosted by: China Film Administration; Beijing Municipal Film Administration; China Media Group; People's Government of Beijing Municipality
- No. of films: 300
- Festival date: Opening: September 21, 2021; Closing: September 29, 2021
- Website: 11th BJIFF

Beijing International Film Festival
- 12th 10th

The 11th Beijing International Film Festival (simplified Chinese: 第11届北京国际电影节; traditional Chinese: 第11屆北京國際電影節) was held in Beijing, China. Hosted by the Beijing Municipal Government and the China Media Group, the festival opened on September 21 with the Chinese 2021 film The Battle at Lake Changjin by Chen Kaige, Tsui Hark and Dante Lam. The festival was originally scheduled to be held from August 14 to 21, but was postponed due to the spread of Corona 19 delta mutation in China.

The festival was held in hybrid format due to COVID-19 pandemic restrictions and around 300 films were screened. The online films are available for streaming on a cloud created by iQiyi. In 11th edition of festival, in 'Retrospect Section' the focus was on comic actor Charlie Chaplin.

The festival was closed on September 29 with the screening of 2019 film Saturday Fiction by Lou Ye. Beyond The Skies a Chinese film by Liu Zhihai won the Tiantan Award for best feature film.

== International jury ==
=== Tiantan Awards ===
Seven members jury was selected for deciding the awards.

- Gong Li, Singaporean actress, chairman of the international jury,
- Nadine Labaki, Lebanese actress, director and activist
- Renny Harlin, Finnish film director, producer and screenwriter
- Chen Kun, Chinese actor and singer
- Zhang Songwen, Chinese actor
- Leste Chen, Taiwanese director
- Wuershan, Chinese director

=== Forward Future ===
- Tony Rayns, President of Jury, British writer, commentator, film festival programmer and screenwriter,
- Yannis Sakaridis, Greek director and screenwriter
- Huang Lu, Chinese actress, director, screenwriter and producer,
- Shuang XueTao, Chinese novelist,
- Shen Yang, Chinese producer and curator

== Panorama ==
=== Opening and closing films ===
- The Battle at Lake Changjin (China), dir: Chen Kaige, Tsui Hark, Dante Lam
- Saturday Fiction (China), dir: Lou Ye

=== Tiantan Awards Official Competition ===
These are the highest awards at the festival. 15 films have been shortlisted for the awards.

Highlighted title ‡ indicates Tiantan award winner

- All About My Mother (China), dir: Zhao Tianyu
- Any Day Now (Finland), dir: Hamy Ramezan
- A Morning of Farewell (Japan), dir: Izuru Narushima
- A School in Cerro Hueso (Argentina), dir: Betania Cappato
- A Siege Diary (Russia), dir: Andrey Zaytsev
- Before Next Spring (China), dir: Li Gen

‡• Beyond The Skies (China), dir: Liu Zhihai

- Caged Birds (Switzerland, Germany), dir: Oliver Rihs
- Conference (Russia, Estonia, UK, Italy), dir: Ivan I. Tversdovskiy
- Last Film Show (India, France), dir: Pan Nalin
- Moon Rock for Monday (Australia), dir: Kurt Martin
- Night of the Kings (France, Ivory Coast, Canada, Senegal), dir: Philippe Lacôte
- No Rest for the Old Lady (Romania), dir: Andrei Gruzsniczki
- Slalom (France, Belgium), dir: Charlene Favier
- The Pact (Denmark), dir: Bille August

=== Forward Future ===
- The Pack - 2020 (The Czech Republic), dir: Tomáš Polenský
- Bone Cage - 2020 (Canada), dir: Taylor Olson
- Namo - 2020 (Iran), dir: Nader Saeivar
- Silenced Tree - 2020 (Iran/Turkey), dir: Faysal Soysal
- The Pit - 2020 (Latvia/ Finland), dir: Dace Pūce
- Knock Knock - 2020 (China), dir: Liu Xiang
- The Whaler Boy - 2020 (Russia/ Poland/ Belgium), dir: Philipp Yuryev
- Chupacabra - 2020 (Russia), dir: Grigory Kolomytsev

=== BJIFF Special: Retrospective of Gong Li ===
- Leap - 2020 (China), dir: Peter Chan
- Shanghai - 2010 (USA), dir: Mikael Håfström
- What Women Want - 2011 (China), dir: Chen Daming
- The Monkey King 2 - 2016 (Mainland China/ Hong Kong), dir: Cheang Pou-soi
- Shanghai Triad - 1995 (China), dir: Zhang Yimou
- Flirting Scholar - 1993 (Hong Kong), dir: Lee Lik-chi
- The Dragon Chronicles – The Maidens - 1994 (Hong Kong / Mainland China), dir: Andy Wing-Keung Chin
- The Story of Qiu Ju - 1992 (China), dir: Zhang Yimou
- Red Sorghum - 1987 (China), dir: Zhang Yimou

=== Premiere ===
- Three Floors - 2021 (Italy), dir: Nanni Moretti
- Satoshi Kon: Dreaming Machine - 2021 (Japan), dir: Pascal-Alex Vincent
- The Employer and the Employee - 2021 (Uruguay/ Argentina/ Brazil/ France), dir: Manolo Nieto
- It's a Flickering Life - 2021 (Japan), dir: Yoji Yamada

=== Restored Classics ===
This section will screen immortal masterpieces.

- Ace in the Hole - 1951 (USA) dir: Billy Wilder
- An Autumn's Tale - 1987, (Hong Kong) dir: Mabel Cheung
- The Godfather Part III - 1990, (USA) dir: Francis Ford Coppola
- The Mirror - 1975 (Soviet Union) dir: Andrei Tarkovsky
- Rouge - 1988, (Hong Kong) dir: Stanley Kwan

=== Retrospect ===
In 11th edition of festival this section will showcase Charlie Chaplin's classic films.

- Limelight - 1952
- The Great Dictator - 1940
- Monsieur Verdoux - 1947
- City Lights - 1931
- Modern Times - 1936
- The Circus - 1928
- The Kid - 1921
- The Gold Rush - 1925

=== Filmmaker in focus ===
- One Future - 2009 (Malaysia) dir: Chui Mui Tan
- Barbarian Invasion - 2021 (Malaysia) dir: Chui Mui Tan
- South of South - 2005 (Malaysia) dir: Chui Mui Tan
- Year without a Summer - 2010 (Malaysia) dir: Chui Mui Tan
- Company of Mushrooms - 2006 (Malaysia) dir: Chui Mui Tan
- The Beautiful Loser - 2015 (Malaysia) dir: Chui Mui Tan

=== Tribute ===
- Diabolique - 1955 (France) dir: Henri-Georges Clouzot
- The Wages of Fear - 1953 (Italy, France) dir: Henri-Georges Clouzot
- Spring, Summer, Fall, Winter... and Spring - 2003 (South Korea) dir: Kim Ki-duk

=== Women's voice ===
- A Balance - 2020 (Japan) dir: Yujiro Harumoto
- Hard Love - 2021 (China) dir: Dong Xueying
- Tomorrow's Dinner Table - 2021 (Japan) dir: Takahisa Zeze

=== Reality Rocks ===
- Mr. Bachmann and His Class - 2021 (Germany) dir: Maria Speth
- Epicentro - 2020 (Austria, France) dir: Hubert Sauper
- Acasă, My Home - 2020 (Romania) dir: Radu Ciorniciuc
- Stanislavski. Lust for Life - 2021 (Russia) dir: Julia Bobkova

=== Vision ===
- A Balance - 2020 (Japan) dir: Yujiro Harumoto
- Apples - 2020 (Greece, Poland) dir: Christos Nikou
- Digger - 2020 (Greece, France) dir: Georgis Grigorakis
- Hold Me Back - 2020 (Japan) dir: Akiko Ohku
- Introduction - 2021 (South Korea) dir: Hong Sang-soo
- Man from Podolsk - 2020 (Russia) dir: Semyon Serzin
- Masha - 2020 (Russia) dir: Anastasiya Palchikova
- Moon, 66 Questions - 2020 (Greece, France) dir: Jacqueline Lentzou
- The North Wind - 2021 (Russia) dir: Renata Litvinova
- Sputnik - 2020 (Russia) dir: Egor Abramenko
- Tailor - 2020 (Greece, Germany, Belgium) dir: Sonia Liza Kenterman

=== Dolby cinema section ===
- Akira - 1988 (Japan), dir: Katsuhiro Otomo
- It - 2017 (USA), dir: Andrés Muschietti
- Venom - 2018 (USA), dir: Ruben Fleischer
- In the Heights - 2021 (USA), dir: Jon M. Chu

== Winners of Tiantan Awards ==
Category	Winner(s)	Film
Best Feature Film	Beyond the Skies	
Best Director	Andrey Zaytsev	A Siege Diary
Best Actor	Group Actor Performance	Beyond the Skies
Best Actress	Noee Abita	Slalom
Best Supporting Actor	Shahab Hosseini	Any Day Now
Best Supporting Actress	Nana Skaarup Voss	The Pact
Best Screenplay	Christian Torpe	The Pact
Best Cinematography	Mi Xinjun	Beyond the Skies
Best Music	Tuomas Nikkinen	Any Day Now
Best Visual Effects	Yanlai Ding, Eric Xu, Ahdee Chui, Samir Ansari	The Wandering Earth
