= Saturday Fiction =

2019 film

- Film poster
- Directed by: Lou Ye
- Written by: Ma Yingli
- Produced by: Ma Yingli; Takashi Asai
- Starring: Gong Li; Mark Chao; Joe Odagiri
- Cinematography: Zeng Jian
- Edited by: Feng Shan Yu Lin; Lou Ye
- Production company: United Entertainment Partners
- Distributed by: United Entertainment Partners; Lumix Media; Bir Film; Strand Releasing; Shaw Organisation
- Release dates: 4 September 2019 (Venice); 15 October 2021 (China)
- Running time: 126 minutes
- Country: China
- Languages: Mandarin; English; Japanese; French
- Box office: US$3,390,000

Saturday Fiction (Chinese: 兰心大剧院) is a 2019 Chinese drama film directed by Lou Ye. Written by Yingli Ma and starring Gong Li, Mark Chao, and Joe Odagiri, it was selected to compete for the Golden Lion at the 76th Venice International Film Festival. The film had its premiere on 4 September 2019 at the festival. It was released theatrically on October 15, 2021 in China.

== Cast ==
- Gong Li as Yu Jin
- Mark Chao
- Joe Odagiri
- Pascal Greggory as Frédéric Hubert
- Tom Wlaschiha as Saul Speyer
- Huang Xiangli
- Wang Chuanjun
- Ayumu Nakajima
- Zhang Songwen

== Release ==
The film was selected to compete for the Golden Lion at the 76th Venice International Film Festival, where it had premiered on 4 September 2019. Later that month the film played at the 57th New York Film Festival It was also selected as closing film of 11th Beijing International Film Festival to be screened on 29 September 2021.
