= Hundred to One Hundred =

Hundred to one hundred
- Directed by: Hossein Shahabi
- Written by: Hossein Shahabi
- Produced by: Hossein Shahabi
- Starring: Mohammad Morovvati; Karim Nobakht; Shirin Rahimi; Azar Vakil
- Cinematography: Hossein Shahabi
- Edited by: Hossein Shahabi
- Music by: Hossein Shahabi
- Production company: Baran film house
- Distributed by: Baran Film House
- Release date: 1995
- Country: Iran
- Language: Persian

Hundred to One Hundred (Persian: صدبرابرصد) is a 1995 Iranian film written and directed by Hossein Shahabi.

== Starring ==
- Mohammad Morovvati
- Karim Nobakht
- Shirin Rahimi
- Azar Vakil
- Hamid Aslani

== Crew ==
- producer: Hossein Shahabi
- Production manager: Hashem Sami
- cinematography: Sadegh Samani
- Sound Recorder: Mahdi Moeeni
- Music: Hossein Shahabi
- Production: Baran film house
