= The Traces of Light =

The traces of light
- رد پاي نور
- Directed by: Hossein Shahabi
- Written by: Hossein Shahabi
- Produced by: Hossein Shahabi
- Starring: Shahram Khazaei; Rahim Fallah; Karim Nobakht; Reza Novini; Mahin Bageri
- Cinematography: Nader Badad Afshord
- Edited by: Hossein Shahabi
- Music by: Hossein Shahabi
- Production company: Baran film house
- Distributed by: Baran Film House
- Release date: 1996
- Running time: 96 minutes
- Country: Iran
- Language: Persian

The Traces of Light (Persian: رد پاي نور) is a 1996 Iranian drama film written and directed by Hossein Shahabi.

== Starring ==
- Shahram Khazaei
- Rahim Fallah
- Karim Nobakht
- Reza Novini
- Shahed Gorbani
- Kimia Saboori
- Mahin Bageri

== Crew ==
- producer: Hossein Shahabi
- Production manager: Ghasem Salari
- Sound Recorder: Shahin Sohrabi
- Editor: Hossein Shahabi Hossein eyvazi
- Music: Hossein Shahabi
- Production: Baran film house 1996
