= The Year of the Cat (film) =

- Directed by: Mostafa Taghizadeh
- Written by: Mostafa Taghizadeh
- Produced by: Saeed Khani
- Starring: Bahram Afshari; Sara Bahrami; Hooman Barghnavard; Shabnam Ghorbani; Ladan Zhavevand; Reza Rashidpour
- Cinematography: Masoud Salami
- Edited by: Morteza Soori
- Music by: Payam Azadi
- Distributed by: Khaneh Film
- Release date: 10 April 2024
- Running time: 104 minutes
- Country: Iran
- Language: Persian
- Box office: 646,065,900,000 IRR

The Year of the Cat is an Iranian comedy film directed and written by Mostafa Taghizadeh and produced by Saeed Khani. The film was released in Iranian cinemas on April 10, 2024.

== Plot ==
The story of The Year of the Cat revolves around a man named Jahangir (Bahram Afshari) who was born in the Year of the Cat. This unlucky year, which occurs every 12 years, brings trouble for those around him. Additionally, Jahangir has an unusual obsession with fame and is willing to do anything to become famous.

== Cast ==
- Bahram Afshari as Jahangir Ghaznavi
- Sara Bahrami as Misha
- Hooman Barghnavard as Dr. Aref Bam
- Shabnam Ghorbani as Taraneh
- Morteza Taghizadeh as Prison guard
- Ladan Zhavevand as Misha's mother
- Noshin Tabrizi as The victim's sister
- Reza Rashidpour as TV host
- Ali Oji
- Hamid Masouminejad
- Mehrdad Sedighian
