= Rain Tree (film) =

Rain Tree ( Persian: درخت بارانی )
- Movie Poster
- Directed by: Hossein Shahabi
- Written by: Hossein Shahabi
- Produced by: Hossein Sharifi
- Starring: Saeed Shilesari; Ali Babakhani; Ali Habibpoor; Mohammad Saremi; Reza Novini
- Cinematography: Ahmad reza Pejhman
- Edited by: Hossein Shahabi
- Music by: Hossein Shahabi
- Production company: Baran film house
- Distributed by: Baran Film House
- Release date: 2001
- Running time: 100 minutes
- Country: Iran
- Language: Persian

Rain Tree (Persian: درخت بارانی) is a 2001 Iranian drama film Written and directed by Hossein Shahabi (Persian: حسین شهابی)

== Starring ==
- Saeed Shilesari
- Ali Babakhani
- Ali Habibpoor
- Mohammad Saremi
- Reza novini
- Samir Bakht Avar
- Ahmad Kalhor
- Soheyla Sadegi

== Crew ==
- Composer: Hossein Shahabi
- Photography: Ahmad Pejhman
- Assistant Director: Manli Shojaeefard
- Producer: Esmat Soofi
