= Hossein Shahabi =

Iranian film director, screenwriter and film producer (1967–2023)

- حسین شهابی
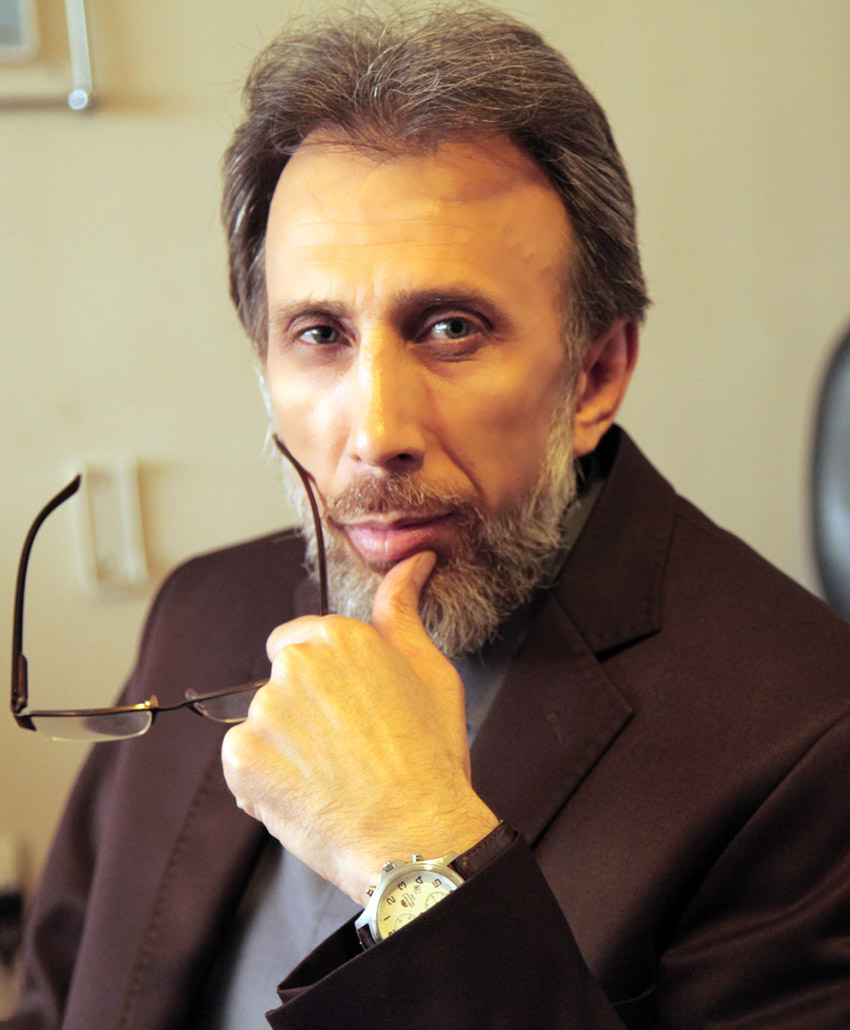
- Shahabi in 2014
- Born: 28 November 1967; Tabriz, Iran
- Died: 22 January 2023 (aged 55); Karaj, Iran
- Education: University of Tehran
- Occupations: Film director, screenwriter and film producer
- Years active: 1996–2023
- Notable work: The Sale – The Bright Day
- Spouse: Bahareh Ansari
- Children: 1
- Awards: Kerala Film Festival 2014 Best Director (The Bright Day); Mardel Plata Film Festival 2013 Special Jury Prize (The Bright Day); Chicago Film Festival 2013 Best Film Prize (The Bright Day); Fajr Film Festival Iran 2012 Diploma award (The Bright Day)
- Website: www.hosseinshahabi.com

Hossein Shahabi (Persian: حسین شهابی; (Note: Persian pronunciation: [hossein shahabi]) 28 November 1967 – 22 January 2023) was an Iranian film director, screenwriter and film producer.

== Biography ==
Shahabi has got Cinema Directing master's degree and Classical Music B.A from Tehran University. After graduation from Tehran University in classical music studies, he spent a few years teaching music. In 1996 he made his first (short) film (Hundred Times Hundred), on the occasion of 100th anniversary of cinema, and received a prize at the (one off) festival, established for the same occasion. Since then he has written, directed and produced 20 shorts, 10 fictional features (for video release in the Iranian market) and 5 features, for the theatrical release, some of them won prizes in the local and international film festivals. The Bright Day (2013) has been his debut, which was well received by the critics and it was nominated in four categories in Fajr International Film Festival, Tehran (February 2013) and won two Honorary Diplomas. The Bright Day had its international premiere at the competition in Mar del Plata film festival, (2013) and got a special mention of the jury. It was also screened at festivals like, 3rd Persian International Film Festival Sydney, Australia, 28th Boston Film Festival, 21st Houston Film Festival, 18th Washington DC Film Festival, 29th Los Angeles Film Festival, the UCAL and The Rice University, in the States and has won the best direction and best film prize, at 24th Festival of Films from Iran, at Chicago's Gene Siskel Film Center, also winning Silver Pheasant Award and a cash prize for The Best Debut Director of the 19th International Film Festival of Kerala, India. The Sale is second long feature film of Hossein Shahabi. For the first time in the 21st international festivals Vesoul France is on the screen.

Shahabi died from a lung infection on 22 January 2023, at the age of 55.

== Cinematic style ==
FIPRESCI/Cinema critic Lalit Rao writes about the first film Hossein Shahabi: Iranian director Hossein Shahabi chose to highlight the importance of the criminal justice system in his homeland Iran. His debut feature The Bright Day (Rooz-e Roshan) depicts the relentless efforts of a brave woman to ensure that truth should prevail at all costs. What makes his film remarkable is the incessant travels carried out in the car by its protagonist Roshan who wouldn't stop at anything in order to save her lover from death penalty. She is constantly on the move in her car in order to convince witnesses to speak the truth which would result in a person escaping the death penalty. This film constantly reminds viewers a lot about films made by Abbas Kiarostami especially 'Close-Up' and 'Like Someone in Love' whose leading players were always on the move to achieve their personal goals. Iranian actress Pantea Bahram is quite convincing in her role as the lone crusader of justice. It was for this film that Hossein Shahabi won silver crow pheasant award for best débutant director during 19th International Film Festival of Kerala 2014.

== Filmography ==
Feature Film & Experimental Films
No	Year	English title	Persian title	Credited as			Notes	Time
No	Year	English title	Persian title	Director	Producer	Writer	Notes	Time
01	2022	Face to face	رو در رو	Yes	Yes	Yes	Feature film	90 Min
02	2017	Conditional release	آزاد به قید شرط	Yes	Yes	Yes	Feature film	120 Min
03	2016	The Cancer Period	بی‌صدا	Yes	Yes	Yes	Feature film	110 Min
04	2014	The Sale	حراج	Yes	Yes	Yes	Feature film	98 Min
05	2013	The Bright Day	روز روشن	Yes	Yes	Yes	The first feature film	96 Min
06	2012	For the Sake of Mahdi	به‌خاطر مهدی	Yes	Yes	Yes	Feature film	125 Min
07	2009	The Last Word	حرف آخر	Yes	Yes	Yes	Short film	30 Min
08	2001	The Photo	عکس	Yes	No	Yes	Experimental Film	110 Min
09	2001	Rain Tree	درخت بارانی	Yes	No	Yes	Short film	30 Min
10	2001	Echo	پژواک	Yes	No	Yes	Short film	25 Min
11	2000	Wars and Treasure	جنگ و گنج	Yes	Yes	Yes	Experimental Film	100 Min
12	2000	Broth Soup	آش نذری	Yes	No	Yes	Experimental Film	80 Min
13	1998	Ghost	شبح	Yes	Yes	Yes	Experimental Film	90 Min
14	1997	Bright Shadow	سایه‌روشن	Yes	Yes	Yes	Experimental Film	90 Min
15	1997	Tunnel 18	تونل ١٨	Yes	Yes	Yes	Experimental Film	120 Min
16	1996	The traces of light	ردپای نور	Yes	Yes	Yes	Experimental Film	94 Min
17	1995	Hundred to one hundred	صدبرابر صد	Yes	Yes	Yes	Short film	10 Min
18	1995	Elevator	آسانسور	Yes	Yes	Yes	Short film	30 Min

== Awards and international presence ==
- Won best film award and Best Editor Award for the film Echoes the Iranian national media festival (1996)
- Diploma and a cash prize for the winner of Best Screenplay writing Script "havva" first festival Women and war (2000)
- Won Diploma award the best screenplay of the 31st Fajr International Film Festival for the movie "the bright day" (2013)
- Won Diploma award the best Actress of the 31st Fajr International Film Festival for the movie "the bright day" (2013)
- Candidate a Crystal simorgh award at 31st Fajr International Film Festival for best first film for the movie bright day (2013)

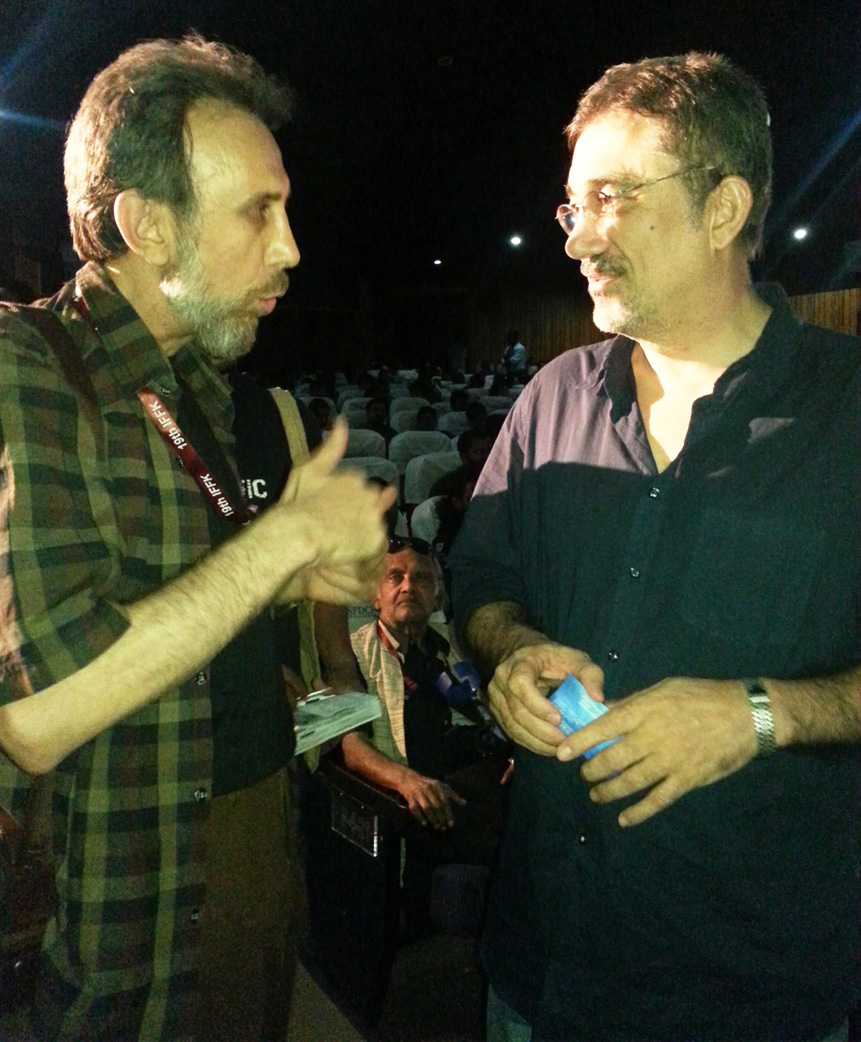
Hossein Shahabi & Nuri Bilge Ceylan film festival of Kerala 2014

- Candidate a Crystal simorgh award for Best Actor at 31st Fajr International Film Festival for the movie "the bright day" (2013)
- Candidate a Crystal simorgh award for Best Sound recorder at 31st Fajr Film Festival for the movie "the bright day" (2013)
- Candidate a Crystal simorgh award for Best Graphic Design at 31st Fajr Film Festival for the movie "the bright day" (2013)
- Won Special Mention of the Jury-at 28th Mar del Plata International Film Festival for the movie the bright day (2014)
- Won Best Film Award at 24th Chicago Iranian Film Festival in America for the movie the bright day (2014)
- Companies at 28th Film Festival in Boston America for the movie the bright day (2014)
- Companies at 21 Film Festival in Houston America for the movie the bright day (2014)
- Companies at 18 Film Festival in Washington DC America for the movie the bright day (2014)
- Companies at the Iranian films festival in America Rice University for the movie "the bright day" (2014)
- Companies at the Iranian films festival in America The Los Angeles Museum of Art for the movie "the bright day"(2014)
- Companies at the Iranian films festival in America UCLA University for the movie "the bright day" (2014)
- Companies at the 3rd Persian International Film Festival Sydney, Australia for the movie "the bright day" (2014)
- Companies at the 21st international film festival of Asian cinema Vesoul, France, for the movie "the sale" (2015)
- Won Silver Pheasant Award and a cash prize for The Best Debut Director of the 19th International Film Festival of Kerala, India (2014)
- Companies at the 11th international film festival of Zurich for the movie "the bright day" (2015)
- Companies at the 15th film festival of Stockholm, Sweden for the movie "The Sale" (2015)
- Companies at the Cambridge Film Festival of 2017 for the movie "conditional release" (2017).
- Companies at the 17th International Film Festival of Tiburon for the movie "conditional release" (2018).
