= Sadreddin Hejazi =

Iranian actor (1948–2024)

- صدرالدین حجازی
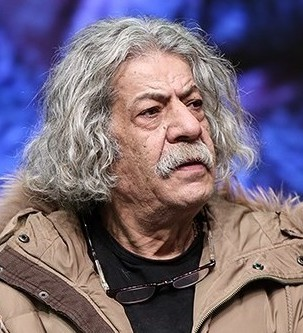
- Hejazi in 2018
- Born: 7 August 1948; Shahreza, Iran
- Died: 14 September 2024 (aged 76); Tehran, Iran
- Occupation: Actor

Sadreddin Hejazi (7 August 1948 – 14 September 2024) was an Iranian film and television actor. He starred in many films, including Captain Khorshid, Santouri and Doubt. Hejazi died in Tehran on 14 September 2024, at the age of 76.
