= Hooman Barghnavard =

Iranian actor

- هومن برق‌نورد
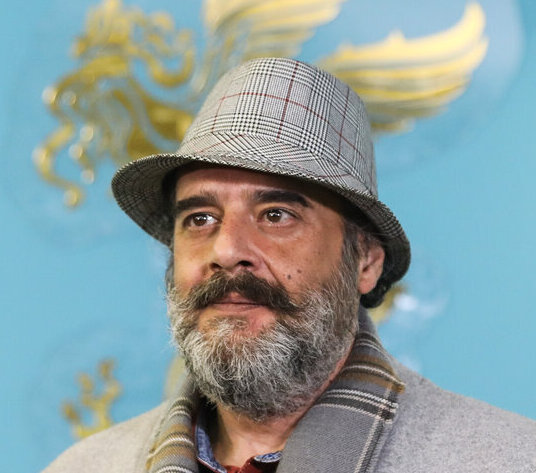
- Barghnavard in 2025
- Born: 26 December 1969 (age 56); Tehran, Iran
- Occupation: Actor
- Years active: 1990–present
- Website: IMDb profile

Hooman Barghnavard (Persian: هومن برق‌نورد; born 26 December 1969) is an Iranian actor. He has received various accolades, including nominations for two Hafez Awards and an Iran Cinema Celebration Award.

== Filmography ==
=== Cinema ===
- The Queen
- Bonbaste Vosogh
- Boofe Koor
- Nargese Mast
- Cinema Nimkat
- Arayeshe Ghaliz
- Bigane
- Adanm Ahani
- Malake
- Gonah karan
- Keifar
- Yek Tekke nan
- Inja Shahre Digarist
- Bi khodahafezi
- Jib bor haye Khiaban Jonobi
- Loone Zanbur
- Blade and Termeh
- Prisoners
- Paradise of Criminals (2024)
- Sayad (2025)

=== Series ===
- Actor
- Jeyran
- Doordast ha
- Ghore
- Padari
- Dood kesh
- Zamane
- Dozdo Police
- Faktor 8
- Bidari
- Cheke Bargashti
- In the Strand of Zayandeh Rud
- Bagh Shishe′ei
- Rooz Haye Bad Be Dar
- Pejman
- Sakhtemane Pezeshkan
