= Shima Nikpour =

Iranian actress (born 1988)

- شیما نیک پور
- Born: 27 April 1982 (age 44); Tehran, Iran
- Education: University of Tehran
- Occupation: actress
- Years active: 1998 – present

Shima Nikpour (Persian: شیما نیک پور, born April 27, 1982) is an Iranian actress who has been active since 1982.

== Filmography ==
Year	Title	Role	Network
2012	Private life Sir and Madam Mim		Cinema
2013	Shemroun Lanes		Cinema
