= Mehran Ahmadi =

Iranian actor

- مهران احمدی
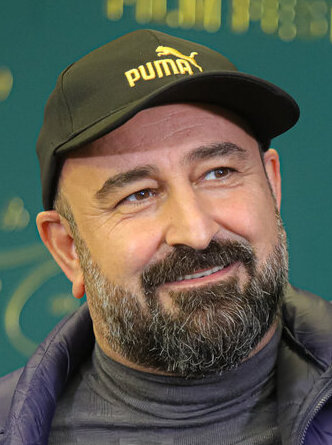
- Ahmadi in 2024
- Born: 28 February 1974 (age 52); Tehran, Iran
- Occupation: Actor
- Known for: Mehran Ahmadi is known for being an Iranian actor.

Mehran Ahmadi (Persian: مهران احمدی, born February 28, 1974 in Tehran) is an Iranian actor, director and assistant director. At the 31st Fajr Film Festival in 1391, he was nominated for the Crystal Simorgh for Best Actor in a Leading Role for Rooze Roshan.

He started his cinematic activity in the field of acting in 2006 by acting in the film Adam.

Ahmadi boycotted the Fajr International Film Festival in response to the 2025–2026 Iranian protests. In response to Mohammad Hossein Mahdavian's criticism of those boycotting the festival as "cowards", Ahmadi responded by defending those choosing to boycott the festival.

== Filmography ==
=== Film ===
- 2021 – Pinto
- 2018 – Centipede
- 2016 – Breath
- 2014 – Tameshk
- 2014 – Totol & Mystery Chest
- 2013 – Track 143
- 2013 – The Bright Day
- 2012 – Boghz
- 2012 – A Respected Family
- 2011 – Thirteen 59
- 2011 – Alzheimer
- 2011 – Absolutely Tame Is a Horse
- 2011 – The Sound of My Foot
- 2010 – Hich
- 2009 – Endless Dreams
- 2009 – Bist
- 2008 – Over There
- 2007 – Adam

=== Web ===
Year	Title	Role	Director	Platform
2014–2015	Fool	Hooshang Tataloo	Kamal Tabrizi	Video CD
2018	Made in Iran 2	Tootoonchi	Borzou Niknejad	Video CD
2021	I Want to Live	Bahman Dashti	Sharam Shah Hosseini	Filimo

=== Television series ===
- The Recall | (iFilm, 2011)
- Ferris wheel | Charkhe Falak (IRIB TV1, 2016)
- Zafarani | Zafarani (IRIB TV2, 2016)
- Capital 3 | Paytakht 3 (IRIB TV1, 2014)
- Sounds of Rain | Avaye Baran (IRIB TV3, 2013–2014)
- Remembrance | Yadavari (IFILM, 2013–2014)
- Mehrabad | Mehrabad (IRIB TV5, 2013)
- Paytakht (series 2, 2013, and 6, 2020)
- The Chef | Ashpazbashi (IRIB TV1, 2009–2010)
