= Majid Vasheghani =

Iranian actor (born 1980)

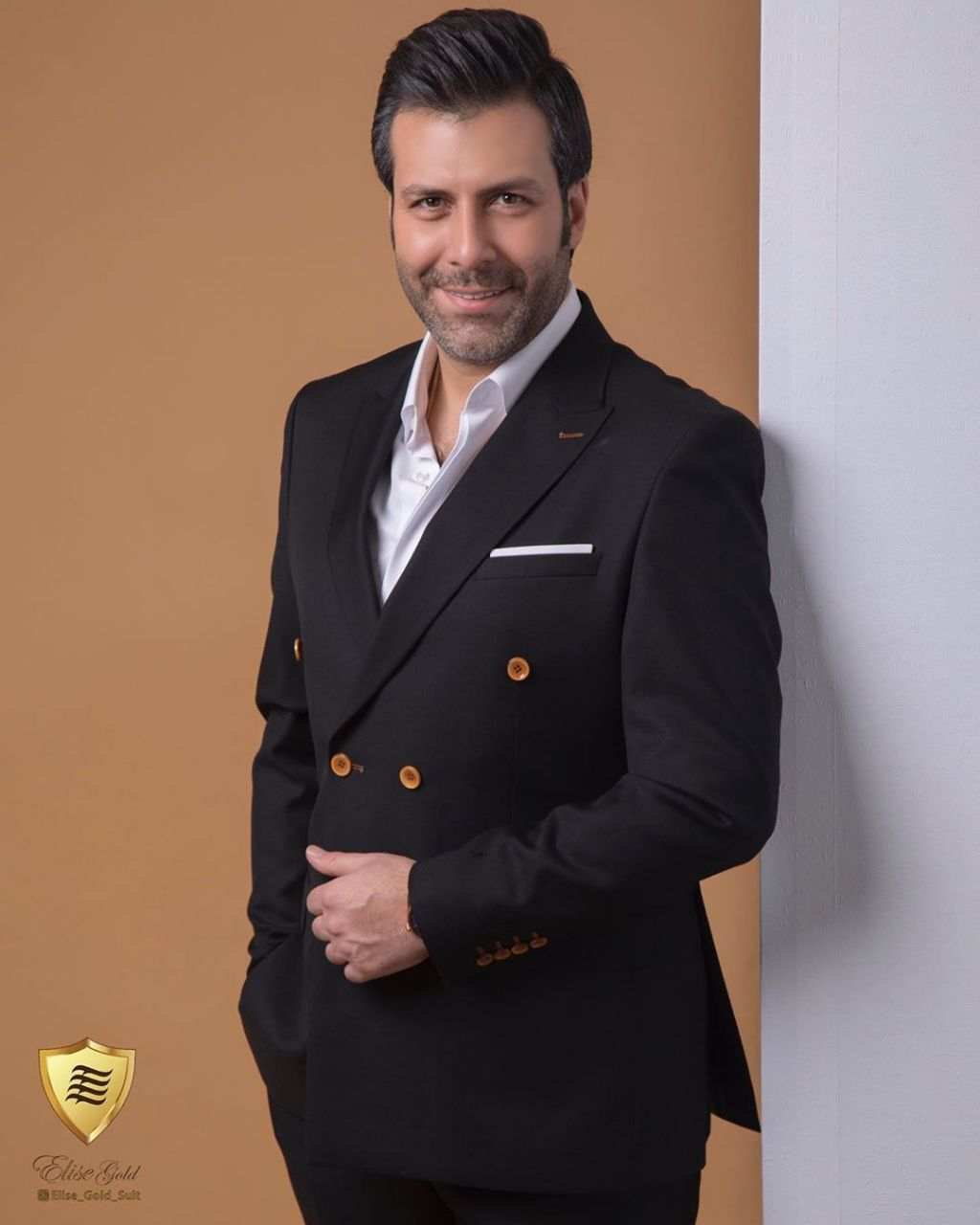
- Vasheghani in 2018
- Born: Majid Vasheghani Farahani; May 27, 1980 (age 46); Tehran, Iran
- Education: Azad University (BS)
- Occupations: Actor; presenter
- Years active: 1999–present

Majid Vasheghani Farahani (Persian: مجید واشقانی فراهانی; born May 27, 1980) is an Iranian actor. He is best known for his roles in Detour (2012), Under the Mother's Feet (2017), and From Destiny (2019–2022). Vasheghani gained recognition and popularity for playing in game shows Mafia Nights (2020–2022), Joker (2022), and Godfather (2022–2024).

He won an Honorary Diploma at the 13th Iran International FICTS Festival for his performance in the sport drama The Highway (2019).

== Early life ==
Majid Vasheghani Farahani was born on May 27, 1980, in Tehran, Iran. He is the first child in the family and his only sister is a sports coach. His father is an Air Force soldier and his mother is a housewife.

He graduated with a Bachelor's degree in Metallurgical engineering. Vashghani started acting from 1998 by attending Amin Tarokh's acting classes.

== Career ==
Him and director Behrang Tofighi are frequent collaborators. They have collaborated nine times in The Losers Squad (2011), Spare (2012), Dominos (2012), Detour (2012), Burning (2014), Beautiful Revolution (2014), Amen (2015), The Roof Top of Tehran (2016) and Under the Mother's Feet (2017).

On June 20, 2022, he won his first award at the 13th Iran International FICTS Festival for his performance in the sport drama The Highway (2019).

== Filmography ==
=== Film ===
Year	Title	Role	Director	Notes	Ref(s)
2001	The Passion of Love	Passenger	Nader Moghaddas		
2005	Crimes and Misdemeanors		Hamid Reza Mohseni	Unreleased film	
2006	A Cup of Tea in Town		Majid Vasheghani	Directorial debut	
2008	Revenge		Behrouz Taheri		
2010	The Ungrateful		Hassan Hedayat	Premiered at the 28th Fajr Film Festival	
2013	Leili		Hamed Kheiri Motlagh		
2014	Burning		Behrang Tofighi	Direct-to-video	
2016	Rabidity		Amir Ahmad Ansari	Premiered at the 34th Fajr International Film Festival	
2018	Alma Group	Ehsan	Abbas Moradian		
2019	The Highway	Taxi Driver	Farnaz Amini	Premiered at the 37th Sport Movies & TV – Milano International FICTS Fest	
2020	Frosted Glasses		Bahador Asadi	Premiered at the 17th Mashhad Fajr Film Festival	
2020	Tehran London		Morteza Zolfaghari Nasab		

=== Web ===
Year	Title	Role	Director	Platform	Notes	Ref(s)
2019	Recovery	Soheil Bourbour	Bahador Asadi	Namava	Main role	
2020–2022	Mafia Nights	Himself	Saeed Aboutaleb	Filimo	Game show	
2021	Ahangi Night	Himself	Hamed Ahangi	Filmnet	Talk show; 1 episode	
2022	Joker	Himself	Ehsan Alikhani, Seyyed Hamed Mirfattahi	Filimo	Game show	
2022	Battle	Himself	Behnam Tashakkor	Namava	Talk show; 1 episode	
2022–2024	Godfather	Himself	Saeed Aboutaleb	Filmnet	Game show	
2023	Z	Z	Saeed Aboutaleb	Tamashakhaneh	Game show	

=== Television ===
Year	Title	Role	Director	Network	Notes	Ref(s)
2001	With the Sun		Mojtaba Yasini	IRIB TV1	TV theater	
2001	Ambush		Masoud Keramati	IRIB TV3	TV series	
2007	Burn Notice		Ahmad Moazemi		TV film	
2008	Revenge		Behrouz Taheri		TV film	
2008	Joorchin		Esmail Jalali		TV film	
2010	Under 8		Siroos Moghaddam	IRIB TV1	TV series	
2011	Capital	Siamak	Siroos Moghaddam	IRIB TV1	TV series	
2011	The Losers Squad		Behrang Tofighi		TV film	
2012	Rental House		Shahed Ahmadlo, Ramin Nasernasir	IRIB TV3	TV series	
2012	Detour	Nima	Behrang Tofighi	IRIB TV3	TV series	
2013	Spare		Behrang Tofighi		TV film	
2013	Dominos		Behrang Tofighi		TV film	
2013	Black Intelligence	Iman Akbarnezhad	Masoud Abparvar	IRIB TV3	TV series, Season 2	
2013	Matador	Ehsan Samen	Farhad Najafi	IRIB TV1	TV series	
2014	Ostrich		Ali Asadollahi		TV film	
2014	I Laugh with You	Reza	Vahid Hosseini	IRIB TV5	TV film	
2014	Beautiful Revolution	Captain Bahrami	Behrang Tofighi	IRIB TV1	TV series	
2014	They Live in Stories		Davoud Bidel	IRIB TV2	TV series	
2014	39 Weeks	Committee Officier	Morteza Ahmadi Harani	IRIB TV5	TV series	
2014	The Marriage Contest		Soheil Moafegh	IRIB TV5	TV film	
2014	Lamp	Fereydoun	Asghar Dehghan	IRIB TV3	TV film	
2015	Lover		Abbas Moradian	Azerbaijan TV	TV film	
2015	Michael		Siroos Moghaddam	IRIB TV1	TV series	
2015	Zendeh Rood	Himself	Alireza Aminmanesh	Isfahan IRIB	TV program	
2015	Amen	Diego Luis	Behrang Tofighi	IRIB TV1	TV series	
2016	The Roof Top of Tehran		Behrang Tofighi	IRIB TV1	TV series	
2016	Get Together	Himself	Mehran Modiri	IRIB Nasim	TV program	
2016	Brother	Mehran	Javad Afshar	IRIB TV2	TV series	
2016	Inscription		Hossein Ghasemi Jami		TV film	
2017, 2021	Khandevaneh	Himself	Rambod Javan	IRIB Nasim	TV program	
2017	Another		Marjan Ashrafizadeh	IRIB TV3	TV series	
2017	Under the Mother's Feet	Sohrab Mahmoudi	Behrang Tofighi	IRIB TV1	TV series	
2017	Glass Wall		Rama Ghavidel	IRIB TV1	TV series	
2017	Better Days: The Last Letter Episodes	Hamed	Danesh Eghbashavi	IRIB TV3	TV series	
2018	Thieves of the Soul		Ahmad Moazami	IRIB TV5	TV series	
2018	My Mother	Bijan	Javad Afshar	IRIB TV3	TV series	
2019, 2021	Shootball	Himself	Mohammad Peyvandi	IRIB Nasim	TV program	
2019	Days of Restlessness	Mansour	Kazem Masoumi	IRIB TV3	TV series, Season 2	
2019	Turbulence	Sina	Vahid Bitarafan	IRIB TV5	TV series	
2019	Dongle	Soheil	Bahador Asadi	IRIB TV3	TV film	
2019–2022	From Destiny	Mansour Afshar	Mohammad Reza Kheradmand, Alireza Bazrafshan	IRIB TV2	TV series	
2020	Narrative		Seyyed Jamal Seyyed Hatami	IRIB TV1	TV series	
2020	Steering Wheel	Himself	Masoud Sanam	IRIB Nasim	TV program	
2020	Hot Ground	Police	Saeed Nematollah	IRIB TV3	TV series	
2021–2022	Open Parenthesis	Himself	Maral Dousti	Radio Namayesh	TV program	
2022	Unmarked	Masoud Kazemi	Rama Ghavidel	IRIB TV2	TV series	
2022	Operation Thunder		Asghar Naeemi	IRIB TV1	TV series	
2024	Seven Heads of the Dragon	Matin Soltankhah	Abolqasem Talebi	IRIB TV3	TV series	

== Theatre ==
Year	Title	Playwright	Director	Stage	Ref(s)
2019	A Little Bite	Farzaneh Soheili	Faghihe Soltani	Shahrzad Theater Complex	

== Awards and nominations ==
Name of the award ceremony, year presented, category, nominee of the award, and the result of the nomination
Award	Year	Category	Nominated Work	Result	Ref.
Iran International FICTS Festival	2022	Best National Acting in a Narrative Film	The Highway	Honorary Diploma	
