= Amin Zendegani =

Iranian actor (born 1972)

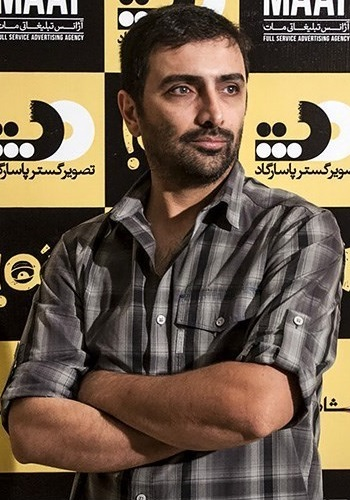
- Zendegani in 2016
- Born: August 27, 1972 (age 54); Tehran, Iran
- Education: Azad University (BFA)
- Occupations: Actor; producer; director; singer
- Years active: 1991–present
- Spouses: Mina Lakani (divorced) Elika Abdolrazzaghi (m. 2013)

Amin Zendegani (Persian: امین زندگانی; born August 27, 1972) is an Iranian actor. He is best known for his role as Solomon in the historical film The Kingdom of Solomon (2010). He has also starred in television series The Newlywed (2002), Mokhtarnameh (2010–2011), Everything Is There (2014–2015), and Touba (2024). Zendegani earned a Hafez Award nomination for his performance in Everything Is There. In 1996, he also won the Best Actor award as the second runner-up in Fajr Theatre Festival for his performance in Burning Red.

== Early life ==
Amin Zendegani was born on August 27, 1972, in Tehran, Iran.

== Personal life ==
Zendegani met actress Mina Lakani who was his co-star on the set of The Eastern Woman (1997). They got married and separated after seven years in 2004. In 2013, he married actress Elika Abdolrazzaghi.

== Filmography ==
=== Film ===
| Year | Title | Role | Director | Notes | Ref(s) |
|---|---|---|---|---|---|
| 1997 | The Eastern Woman | Mahmoud | Rambod Lotfi | | |
| 2000 | Actor | Ali's colleague | Mohammad Ali Sajjadi | | |
| 2002 | Dummies | | Ali Ghavitan | | |
| 2005 | I and Deborah | | Ziaeddin Dorri | Released in 2022 | |
| 2010 | Ernest's Family | | Mohsen Damadi | Lead role | |
| 2010 | The Kingdom of Solomon | Solomon | Shahriar Bahrani | Lead role | |
| 2011 | Devil's Throat | Ayoub | Hamid Bahmani | Lead role | |
| 2012 | The Path of Heaven | Mos'ab | Mehdi Sabaghzadeh | Lead role | |
| 2012 | Octopus | Ajouzeh | Javad Hashemi | | |
| 2012 | Untitled | Sam | Orod Darvish | | |
| 2014 | Oblivion Season | Morteza | Abbas Rafi'i | | |
| 2014 | Meteor of Light | Reza | Mohammad Reza Eslamlou | Lead role | |
| 2016 | September 24 | Mohsen HajiHassani Kargar | Maryam Ebrahimvand | Lead role | |
| 2018 | A Baby with Red Socks | | Khodadad Jalali | | |
| 2018 | Rendezvous in the Park | Amin | Flora Sam | | |
| 2018 | Nazli | Mehdi Javdan | Mahmoud Moazemi | | |
| 2018 | In the Path of Rain | Ra'yan | Hamed Katebi | Animation; lead role | |
| 2019 | Fall Asleep | | Mostafa Ghorbanpour | | |
| 2020 | Like Someone in Love | | Bahram Gohari | | |
| 2021 | Another Self | | Amir Tavakoli | | |
| 2021 | City of Cats | Tiz Gorbeh | Javad Hashemi | | |
| 2024 | City of Cats 2 | Tiz Gorbeh | Javad Hashemi | | |
| TBA | The Conspiracy | | Davoud Norouzi | Lead role; completed in 2021 | |

=== Web ===
| Year | Title | Role | Director | Platform | Notes | Ref(s) |
|---|---|---|---|---|---|---|
| 2014 | King of Ear | Ataollah Vaesi | Davoud Mirbagheri | Filimo | Recurring role | |
| 2021 | Mutual Friendship | Himself | Shahab Hosseini | Namava | Talk show; 1 episode | |
| 2022 | Ahangi Night | Himself | Hamed Ahangi | Filmnet | Talk show; 1 episode | |
| 2023 | Secret Army | Himself | Saeed Aboutaleb | Filimo | Game show | |
| 2024 | Joker | Himself | Ehsan Alikhani | Filimo | Game show | |

=== Television ===
| Year | Title | Role | Director | Network | Notes | Ref(s) |
|---|---|---|---|---|---|---|
| 1996 | The Young Lawyers | | Bahram Kazemi | IRIB TV2 | TV series; guest appearance | |
| 1998 | To the Glory | | Sirous Moghaddam | IRIB TV3 | TV series; guest appearance | |
| 1998 | The Third Way | | Ghasem Jafari | IRIB TV3 | TV series; main role | |
| 1999 | Youthful Days | | Shapour Gharib, Asghar Tavasoli | IRIB TV5 | TV series; guest appearance | |
| 2000 | Fellow Traveler | | Ghasem Jafari | IRIB TV3 | TV series; main role | |
| 2002 | The Newlywed | | Bijan Mirbagheri | IRIB TV2 | TV series; main role | |
| 2003 | The Lost Innocence | Zayd | Davoud Mirbagheri | IRIB TV3 | TV series; supporting role | |
| 2004 | The Enchanted Ones | Nima Vosough | Dariush Farhang | IRIB TV5 | TV series; main role | |
| 2006 | A Simple Mistake | | Ebrahim Sheibani | IRIB TV1 | TV film; main role | |
| 2008 | Until Morning | Siavash Badr | Mohammad Ali Bashe Ahangar, Majid Javanmard | IRIB TV5 | TV series; main role | |
| 2008 | Nightmare | Mansour | Sirous Moghaddam | IRIB TV1 | TV film; main role | |
| 2008 | A Few Steps Closer | | Asghar Hashemi | IRIB TV1 | TV film; main role | |
| 2009 | Silence | | Mehrdad Rayani | IRIB TV4 | TV film; main role | |
| 2009 | The Moon in the Shadow | | Saeed Ebrahimifar | IRIB TV1 | TV film; main role | |
| 2009 | Depth | | Hojat Ghasemzadeh Asl | IRIB TV4 | TV film; main role | |
| 2010 | The Nurse | | Alireza Sabzevari | IRIB TV2 | TV film; main role | |
| 2010 | Fictions and Realities | | Hojat Ghasemzadeh Asl | IRIB Namayesh | TV film; main role | |
| 2010–2011 | Mokhtarnameh | Muslim ibn Aqil | Davoud Mirbagheri | IRIB TV1 | TV series; main role | |
| 2011 | A Cage to Fly | | Yousef Seyyed Mahdavi | IRIB TV1 | TV series; main role | |
| 2012 | Boomerang | | Esmail Fallahpour | IRIB TV3 | TV film; main role | |
| 2013 | Memories of an Unfinished Man | Homayoun Poursina | Sadegh Karamyar | IRIB TV1 | TV series; main role | |
| 2014–2015 | Everything Is There | Mehdi Farahmand | Shahram Shah Hosseini | IRIB TV3 | TV series; main role | |
| 2015 | The Day Comes | Sadra | Ebrahim Sheibani | IRIB TV5 | TV film; main role | |
| 2015 | Zero Hour | Sam Shekarchian | Saeed Soltani | IRIB TV3 | TV miniseries; main role | |
| 2016 | Ferris Wheel | | Azizollah Hamidnezhad | IRIB TV1 | TV series; hasti episode | |
| 2017 | Nurses | Reza Eskandari | Alireza Afkhami | IRIB TV1 | TV series; main role | |
| 2017 | Deathless | | Mohammad Kermanshahi | IRIB TV3 | TV film; main role | |
| 2017 | Better Days: Alone in Tehran | Reza Harirchi | Navid Mihandoost | IRIB TV1 | TV miniseries; main role | |
| 2019 | Dr. Mahan's Family | Amir Mahan | Rama Ghavidel, Ali Mohammad Ghasemi | IRIB TV2 | TV series; main role | |
| 2019 | The Last Shelter | Behrouz | Sadegh Yari | IRIB TV1 | TV miniseries; main role | |
| 2020 | Molkavan | Mehrdad Salimi | Ahmad Moazemi | IFilm | TV series; main role | |
| 2020–2021 | Safe House | Afshin | Ahmad Moazemi | IRIB TV1 | TV series; main role | |
| 2022 | Katebe Azam | Hatam | Mehdi Ghafouri | IRIB TV2 | TV series; main role | |
| 2023 | Habib | Habib | Joud Saeed | IRIB TV2 | TV series; main role | |
| 2023 | The Book | – | Amin Zendegani | IRIB TV3 | TV film; as director | |
| 2024 | Touba | Fakhreddin Mirjahan | Saeed Soltani | IRIB TV1 | TV series; main role | |

== Theatre ==
- Requiem for Dracula

== Awards and nominations ==
| Award | Year | Category | Nominated Work | Result | Ref(s) |
|---|---|---|---|---|---|
| Fajr Theatre Festival | 1996 | Best Actor | Burning Red | 2nd runner-up | |
| Hafez Award | 2015 | Best Actor – Television Series Drama | Everything Is There | Nominated | |
