= Elika Abdolrazzaghi =

Iranian actress (born 1979)

- الیکا عبدالرزاقی
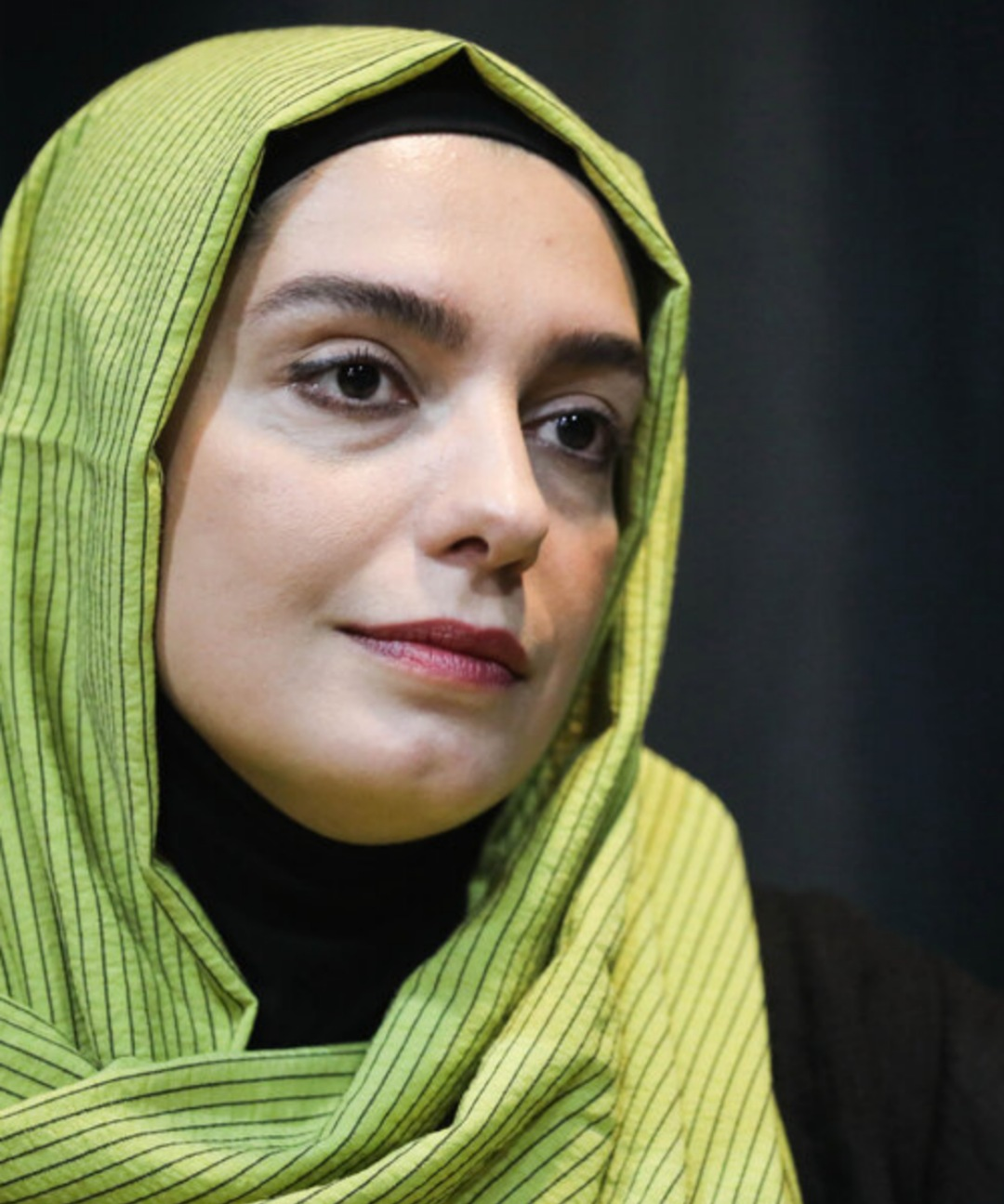
- Abdolrazzaghi in 2020
- Born: 9 August 1979 (age 46); Ramsar, Mazandaran, Iran
- Occupation: Actress
- Years active: 1998–present
- Spouse: Amin Zendegani (m. 2013)

Elika Abdolrazzaghi (Persian: الیکا عبدالرزاقی; born 9 August 1979) is an Iranian actress. She has received various accolades, including a Hafez Award.

== Career ==
Elika Abdolrazaghi began her acting career in 1997 by attending acting courses under the Iranian director Hamid Samandarian. Her television debut came in 1998 with a role in Gomshodeh, a TV series directed by Masoud Navabi. Her first appearance in cinema was with a role in the 1999 film Mummy 3.

Elika gained widespread recognition and fame with her performance in Ghahve-ye Talkh (Bitter Coffee), a popular series directed by Mehran Modiri, released on home video. Her work in Ghahve-ye Talkh earned her critical acclaim and public recognition.

In 2012, she was awarded the Hafez Award for Best Actress in a Comedy for her performance in Ghahve-ye Talkh, solidifying her position as one of Iran's notable comedic actresses.

== Personal life ==
At the age of 11, Abdolrazzaghi was diagnosed with Guillain–Barré syndrome. In 2012, she married fellow actor Amin Zendegani.

== Filmography ==
=== Film ===
Year	Title	Role	Director	Notes	Ref(s)
2007	The Magical Generation	Forough's friend	Iraj Karimi		
2008	Blue Tooth		Houman Seyyedi	Short film	
2008	Shirin	Woman in audience	Abbas Kiarostami		
2011	The Son of Dawn		Behrouz Afkhami		
2011	Women Are from Venus, Men Are from Mars		Kazem Rastgoftar		
2021	City of Cats	Asal Pishi	Javad Hashemi		
2024	City of Cats 2	Asal Pishi	Javad Hashemi		

=== Web ===
Year	Title	Role	Director	Platform	Notes	Ref(s)
2010–2012	Bitter Coffee	Fakhroltaj	Mehran Modiri		Main role	
2012	Made in Iran	Roya	Mohammad Hossein Latifi		Recurring role	
2013	My Villa	Helia Meshkat	Mehran Modiri		Main role	
2013	Mozaffar's Treasure	Mehrnaz	Mehran Modiri		Main role	
2014	I'm Just Kidding	(various roles)	Mehran Modiri		Recurring role	
2022	Antenna	Zhaleh Rahmani	Ebrahim American	Namava	Main role	
2023	Secret Army	Herself	Saeed Aboutaleb	Filimo	Game show	
2023	FoFo: A Passenger from Kamado	Shahrzad Demirchi	Meysam Me'raji	Filmnet	Main role	
2023	Z	Herself	Saeed Aboutaleb	Tamashakhaneh	Game show	
2023–2024	Godfather	Herself	Saeed Aboutaleb	Filmnet	Game show	
2024	Oscar	Herself	Mehran Modiri	Filimo	Game show	
2024	Joker	Herself	Ehsan Alikhani	Filimo	Game show	
2024	Ahangi Night	Herself	Hamed Ahangi	Filmnet	Talk show; 1 episode	

=== Television ===
Year	Title	Role	Director	Network	Notes	Ref(s)
1998	Lost		Masoud Navabi	IRIB TV1	TV series; supporting role	
2017	Better Days: Chahargah		Bijan Mirbagheri	IRIB TV1	TV miniseries; main role	
2018	Board of Directors	Eli Beigi	Maziar Miri	IRIB TV5	TV series; main role	
2018	Armando		Ehsan Abdipour	IRIB TV1	TV series; main role	
2020	The Soldier	Yalda Mafi	Hadi Moghaddamdoost	IRIB TV3	TV series; main role	
2021–2022	It Snows Silently	Simin Shakiba	Pouria Azarbayjani	IRIB TV3	TV series; main role	
2023	The Book		Amin Zendegani	IRIB TV3	TV film	
TBA	Salman the Persian		Davoud Mirbagheri	IRIB TV1	TV series	

=== Short film ===
- Dandâne Âbi (Houman Seyyedi)
- Yek Menhâye Binahâyat (Rasoul Ghasemi)
- Sefr (Reza Sanjabi)
- Da'vat (Mahdi Karampoor)

=== Telefilm ===
- Inja Aseman Hamishe Abri nist (Mahdi Golestaneh, 2013)
- Hesse Tamas (2012)
- Mardane Zamin (Mahdi Sabbaq zad, 2011)
- Yek Eshtebahe Kuchulu (Afsaneh Monadi, 2010)
- Hagho sokout (2010)
- Mah Az ruye Sakku (Arash Moayyerian, 2008)
- Hamchon Yek Roya (Mohammadali Najafi, 2008)

== Theater ==
Year	Show	Director
2018	Medea San Medar	Burjin Abdolrazzaghi
2016	Bâghe Âlbaloo	Atila Pesyani
2014	Don Kamilo	Koroosh Narimani
2013	Parvâz Be Târiki	Afshin Hashemi
2012	33% Neil Simon	Afsaneh Mahian
2012	Bâzras Hânde Vâghei	Burjin Abdolrazzaghi
2008	Molâghât Bâ Bânuye Sâlkhorde	Hamid Samandarian
2008	Goftegu pas az yek Khâksepâri	Burjin Abdolrazzaghi
2007	Emruz Dooster Nadâram	Ali Hashemi
2006	Az Khâb tâ Mahtâb	Ali Hashemi
2004	Alotria	Vahid Rabbani, Mohammadreza Jozi
2004	Marde Ettefâghi	Vahid Rabbani
2001	Otobusi Be Name Havas	Afsaneh Mahian
2001	Behjat	Hosein Atefi
2000	Naghshe Zan	Ali Hashemi
1998	Dâyereye Gachi Ghafghazi	Hamid Samandarian

== Awards and nominations ==
Name of the award ceremony, year presented, category, nominee of the award, and the result of the nomination
Award	Year	Category	Nominated Work	Result	Ref.
Hafez Awards	2011	Best Actress – Television Series Comedy	Bitter Coffee	Won	
Hafez Awards	2025	Best Actress – Theatre	This World Owes Me a Concert	Nominated	
