= Fariba Naderi =

Iranian actress (born 1984)

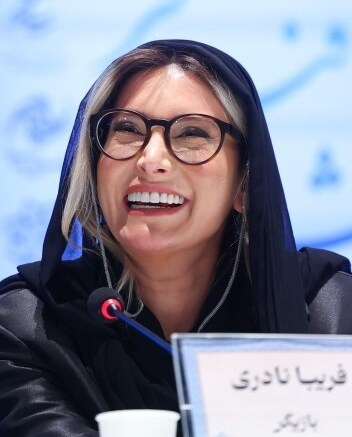
- Naderi at the 2025 Fajr Film Festival
- Born: April 12, 1984 (age 42); Tehran, Iran
- Occupation: Actress
- Years active: 2004–present
- Spouses: Masoud Rasam (m. 2006; died 2009) Mehrdad Tabatabaei (m. 2017)
- Children: 1

Fariba Naderi (Persian: فریبا نادری; born April 12, 1984) is an Iranian actress. In 2025, she received critical acclaim and won the Crystal Simorgh for Best Actress at the 43rd Fajr Film Festival for her breakthrough role as a widow experiencing premature ovarian insufficiency in Setareh's Husband (2025).

== Early life ==
Fariba Naderi was born on 12 April 1984 in Tehran. She has one brother and two sisters. Naderi married Mosoud Rassam, who was significantly older than her, at a young age, stating that the marriage was her own decision. Following Rassam's death in 2009, she announced in an interview with ISNA that she would never marry a television or film actor. Regarding her late husband, she said, "I had a loving life with Mosoud Rasam, and despite the twenty-seven-year age difference, I never felt any void in our relationship. Even his smallest words were enlightening to me, and my best memory of him is his profound words, which still remain in my mind."

== Filmography ==
=== Film ===
Year	Title	Role	Director	Notes	Ref(s)
2009	White & Black		Ghasem Jafari	Unreleased film	
2011	Requirement of Marriage	Shaghayegh	Mohsen Monshizadeh	Direct-to-video	
2011	A Double Standard		Yousef Teymouri	Direct-to-video	
2011	Love Again		Bahman Goudarzi	Direct-to-video	
2012	Naive		Mohsen Monshizadeh	Direct-to-video	
2014	Nights of Shiraz		Abbas Moradian	Direct-to-video	
2014	Two Stupid Charlatans		Javanshir Rostami	Direct-to-video	
2015	Lover		Abbas Moradian	Direct-to-video	
2015	Seacoast		Arash Moayerian		
2016	Good Sense of Life		Farnaz Amini	Direct-to-video	
2016	Giti's Problem	Nader's wife	Bahram Kazemi		
2017	Lamborghini		Mohammad Asadnia	Direct-to-video	
2017	Me & Sharmin	Tina's friend	Bijan Shirmarz		
2022	Killing a Traitor	Nazi	Masoud Kimiai		
2023	Wind of Change	Fariba	Abbas Rafei		
2023	Empty Perfumes	Samira	Bahareh Rahnama		
2024	Summer Time	Marzi	Mahmoud Kalari		
2025	Setareh's Husband	Setareh	Ebrahim Irajzad		
2026	The Roof	Fariba	Ebrahim Amini		

=== Web ===
Year	Title	Role	Director	Platform	Notes	Ref(s)
2015	Love Is Not Closed		Bijan Birang		Cancelled after five episodes	
2015	Stop, God Sees		Pedram Zamani		Unreleased series; 1 episode	
2020	Iranian Dinner	Herself	Saeed Aboutaleb	Filimo, Namava	Reality show; 4 episodes	
2021	Mafia Nights	Herself	Saeed Aboutaleb	Filimo	Game show; 6 episodes	
2021	Ahangi Night	Herself	Hamed Ahangi	Filmnet	Talk show; 1 episode	
2023–2024	Guardiola's Father	Banafsheh	Saeed Nematollah	Tamashakhaneh	Supporting role	
TBA	I'll Die Without You		Abbas Moradian		Supporting role	

=== Television ===
Year	Title	Role	Director	Network	Notes	Ref(s)
2005	The Red Pearl		Masoud Rasam	IRIB Tehran	TV series; main role	
2007	Rainy Flower		Abbas Ranjabr	IRIB TV3	TV series; main role	
2008	Me & Pouti		Hamid Ghadakchian, Masoud Farkhondeh	IRIB TV2	TV series; season 3, main role	
2008	Little Great Man		Masoud Rasam	IRIB TV2	TV series; supporting role	
2009	Non-Confidential		Masoud Rasam	IRIB TV5	TV series; main role	
2009	Factor VIII	Mina Iranmanesh	Reza Karimi	IRIB TV1	TV series; supporting role	
2010	The Years of Constitution	Reyhan	Mohammad Reza Varzi	IRIB TV3	TV series; supporting role	
2010	The Sky Is Not Always Cloudy	Sahar Pouya	Saeed Alemzadeh	IRIB TV1	TV series; main role	
2011	Forgotten	Nazi	Fereydoun Hassanpour	IRIB TV1	TV series; supporting role	
2011–2012	The Window	Hedieh Hedayat	Ghodratollah Solhmirzaee	IRIB TV5	TV series; main role	
2012	Like Glasses	Major Ahmadi	Javad Mozdabadi	IRIB TV1	TV miniseries; supporting role	
2012	Bad Cheque	Raheleh	Sirous Moghaddam	IRIB TV1	TV series; supporting role	
2012	Long Path		Reza Karimi	IRIB TV1	TV series; supporting role	
2012	The Billionaire		Alireza Amini	IRIB TV1	TV series; supporting role	
2013	Rainy Land		Javad Mozdabadi	IRIB TV2	TV film; supporting role	
2014	Sunglasses		Reza Rashidpour	IRIB Nasim	TV series; main role	
2014	The Ostrich		Ali Asadollahi	Radio Namayesh	TV film; main role	
2014	Cuckoo	Fariba	Mahmoud Moazemi	IRIB TV2	TV series; main role	
2014	39 Weeks	Faezeh	Morteza Ahmadi Harandi	IRIB TV5	TV series; supporting role	
2014–2019	Setayesh	Parisima Safaee	Saeed Soltani	IRIB TV3	TV series; season 2–3, main role	
2015	On the Way to the Bride's House		Afshin Sadeghi	IRIB Namayesh	TV film; main role	
2016, 2022	Khandevaneh	Herself	Rambod Javan	IRIB Nasim	TV program; guest appearance	
2017	Nurses	Mahboubeh Ezati	Alireza Afkhami, Shahram Shah Hosseini	IRIB TV1	TV series; main role	
2017	Better Days: Alone in Tehran	Zohreh	Navid Mihandoost	IRIB TV1	TV miniseries; main role	
2017	The Lost Ones		Reza Karimi	IRIB TV2	TV series; main role	
2017	Passion of Husayn	Herself	Hamed Negaresh	IRIB TV2	TV program; guest appearance, 1 episode	
2019–2022	From Destiny	Elham	Mohammad Reza Kheradmandan, Alireza Bazrafshan	IRIB TV2	TV series; season 1–3, main role	
2020	The Neighbor	Manouchehr's wife	Ahmad Darvishalipour	IRIB TV2	TV series; season 3, main role	
2020	Get Together	Herself	Mehran Modiri	IRIB Nasim	TV program; guest appearance, 1 episode	
2022	Under One Roof		Hamed Tehrani Alavi	IRIB Nasim	TV miniseries; main role	
2025	New Year	Herself		IRIB TV3	TV special; guest appearance, 1 episode	
2025	A Lock of Hair & All These Hearts	Herself	Amin Talebi	IRIB Nasim	TV special; guest appearance, 1 episode	

== Theatre ==
Year	Title	Playwright	Director	Stage	Ref(s)
2019	Utopia	Arash Sanjabi	Arash Sanjabi	Fourth Wall Theatre	
2023	The Story of Lasting Songs	Jalaloddin Dorri	Jalaloddin Dorri	Sa'dabad Complex	
2025	Lost Pieces of a Marriage Story	Mohammad Rahmanian	Mohammad Rahmanian	Mall of the Emirates	

== Awards and nominations ==
Name of the award ceremony, year presented, category, nominee of the award, and the result of the nomination
Award	Year	Category	Nominated Work	Result	Ref(s)
Dhaka International Film Festival	2026	Best Actress	Setareh's Husband	Won	
Fajr Film Festival	2025	Best Actress in a Leading Role	Setareh's Husband	Won	
Slemani International Film Festival	2026	Best International Leading Actress	Setareh's Husband	Won	
