= Bahareh Afshari =

Iranian actress (born 1984)

- بهاره افشاری
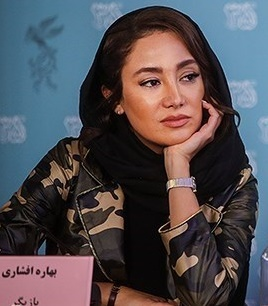
- Afshari at the 2017 Fajr Film Festival
- Born: July 5, 1984 (age 41); Tehran, Iran
- Occupation: Actress
- Years active: 2002–present

Bahareh Afshari (Persian: بهاره افشاری; born July 5, 1984) is an Iranian actress. She is best known for her role in She Was an Angel (2005). She earned a Hafez Award nomination for her performance in Distances (2010).

== Early life and career ==
Before becoming an actress, Bahareh Afshari worked in editing and painting. She was originally a professional fashion designer, with her own boutique and a client list that included numerous actors. In 2004, Chelcheragh magazine even named her the youngest fashion designer in Iran during an interview.

Four months later, Afshari stepped into the world of acting but chose to proceed cautiously, turning down roles that didn’t align with her goals. Years earlier, she had made her first appearance in a television series, an experience she found unsatisfactory, which led her to consider leaving acting altogether. However, after some time, director Kianoush Ayari persuaded her to join the cast of Roozegare Gharib, a biographical series about Dr. Mohammad Gharib. In this series, Afshari portrayed two different roles, and Ayari later introduced her for a part in She Was an Angel.

Currently, Bahareh Afshari co-manages a design company with her only brother, where she leads the fashion design department.

== Filmography ==
=== Film ===
Year	Title	Role	Director	Notes	Ref(s)
2008	Miss Iran		Saman Moghaddam	Banned without a reason given	
2008	Shirin	Woman in audience	Abbas Kiarostami		
2009	Cottage		Javad Afshar		
2009	Sweet Life	Azar	Ghodratollah Solhmirzaee		
2009	24th Street	Arezoo Hakami	Saeed Asadi		
2010	Pay Back	Leila	Tahmineh Milani		
2010	Marriage in the Extra Time	Shirin	Saeed Soheili		
2010	Big Trouble		Mehdi Golestaneh		
2011	Thesis	Azar	Hamed Kolahdari		
2011	3 Degrees of Fever	Soheil's first love	Hamid Reza Salahmand		
2014	Miʿrajis	Razieh Zamani	Masoud Dehnamaki		
2014	Tatal and the Secret of the Chest		Vahid Golestan		
2015	Love and Madness		Hassan Najafi		
2016	The Sweet Scent, the Bitter Scent		Naser Mohammadi		
2017	Guidance Patrol 2		Saeed Soheili		
2018	Silent Voices		Sahabanoo Zolghadr		
2018	Loveulance	Maryam	Mohsen Mahini		
2018	Alma Group		Abbas Moradian		
2019	Prisoners	Setareh	Masoud Dehnamaki		
2021	Parisa		Mohammad Reza Rahmani		
2022	The Future		Amir Pourkian		
2022	The Sixth Day	Negin	Hojat Ghasemzadeh Asl		
TBA	Agreement in Principal		Amir Pourkian	Post-production	
TBA	Dance of the Dolphin		Alireza Amini	Post-production	

=== Web ===
Year	Title	Role	Director	Platform	Ref(s)
2018	13 Shomali	Herself	Alireza Amini	Filmnet	
2018–2019	Forbidden	Taraneh Mashayekh	Amir Pourkian	Filimo	
2021	Mafia Nights	Herself	Saeed Aboutaleb	Filimo	
2021	Predictor	Herself	Reza Baharvan, Amin Entezari	Namava	
2022–2023	Godfather	Herself	Saeed Aboutaleb	Filmnet	
2023	Camp Nou	Maryam Sarcheshmeh	Manouchehr Hadi	Filimo	
2023	The Lost Prestige	Hajar Falahzadeh	Sajad Pahlevanzadeh	Filimo	
TBA	Heartless		Kamal Tabrizi	I Net	

=== Television ===
Year	Title	Role	Director	Network	Ref(s)
2005	She Was an Angel	Satan	Alireza Afkhami	IRIB TV2	
2007–2008	Gharib's Story	Zari Maman	Kianoush Ayari	IRIB TV3	
2010	Distances	Bita Rahimi	Hossein Soheilizadeh	IRIB TV3	
2012	Hand Over Hand	Noushin Zandi	Mohsen Yousefi	IRIB TV3	
2012	The Silver Man	Noora Fallah / Noora Koohzad	Kazem Masoumi	IRIB TV3	
2014	Miʿrajis	Razieh Zamani	Masoud Dehnamaki	IRIB TV1	
2015	The Last Game	Nastaran Boustani	Hossein Soheilizadeh	IRIB TV5	
2015	Need		Hossein Soheilizadeh	IRIB TV1	
2018	Lovers' Secret	Samira	Mohammad Hossein Latifi	IRIB TV1	
TBA	Midnight Dream		Hassan Akhoundpour		

== Awards and nominations ==
Award	Year	Category	Nominated Work	Result	Ref(s)
Hafez Award	2011	Best Actress – Television Series Drama	Distances	Nominated	
