= Behrang Alavi =

Iranian actor (born 1980)

- بهرنگ علوی
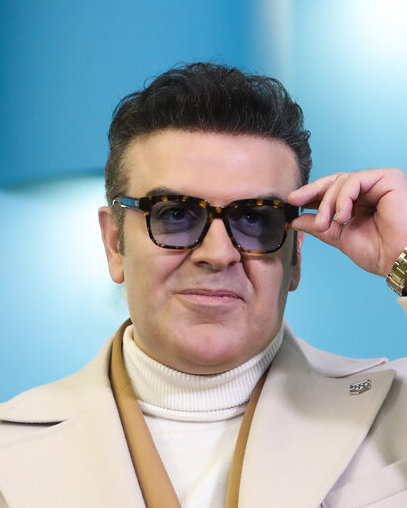
- Alavi in 2025
- Born: 17 April 1980 (age 45); Tehran, Iran
- Occupation: Actor
- Years active: 1991–present

Behran Alavi (Persian: بهرنگ علوی, born April 17, 1980) is an Iranian actor. He has received various accolades, including nominations for a Crystal Simorgh and two Hafez Awards.

== Early life ==
Behrang was born on 1 April 1980 in Azadi Hospital in Tehran. He is the only child of a family of three. His father is a retired cultural director and his mother is a telecom director. He is single and has a diploma in computer drawing. He is also an acting graduate of the first graduate course of Karnameh Cultural-Artistic Institute.

== Filmography ==
=== Film ===
Year	Title	Role	Director	Notes
2006	A Few Days Later		Niki Karimi	
2013	Trapped	Behrang	Parviz Shahbazi	
2016	Lantouri	Saeed	Reza Dormishian	
2016	Parting	Mousa	Navid Mahmoudi	
2017	Blockage		Mohsen Gharaee	
2018	Woman's Enemy	Majid / Ashkan	Karim Amini	
2019	Pig Gene	Rouzbeh	Saeed Soheili	
2019	Texas 2	Sirous	Masoud Atyabi	
2020	For Ever	Abbas	Omid Amin Negareshi	
2021	Lady of the City	Ebrahim	Maryam Bahraloloumi	
2021	Punch Drunk	Shahrokh	Adel Tabrizi	
2021	Mediterranean	Samadi	Hadi Hajatmand	
2022	The Deceased	Assad	Hossein Namazi	
2023	Number 10	Dr. Behjat	Hamid Zargarnezhad	
2023	Roxana	Sia	Parviz Shahbazi	

=== Web ===
Year	Title	Role	Director	Platform
2020	Mafia Nights	Himself	Saeed Aboutaleb	Filimo
2021	Ahangi Night	Himself	Hamed Ahangi	Filmnet
2022	Made in Iran	Zali	Bahman Goudarzi	Filimo
2022	Souda		Iman Yazdi	Upera
2023	The Black Hole	Ayat Aghababee	Hossein Namazi	Filmnet
2023	Touch Move	Himself	Omid Sohrabi	Namava
2023	The Screamer		Siamak Khajehvand	Filmnab
2023	TNT	Himself	Hamed Ahangi	Filimo
2023–2024	Mafia Nights: Zodiac	Himself	Mohammad Reza Rezaeean	Filimo
2024	Oscar	Himself	Mehran Modiri	Filimo
2024	Joker	Himself	Ehsan Alikhani, Hamed Mirfatahi	Filimo

== Awards and nominations ==
1. Candidate for the supporting role of a male actor in 31st Fajr Film Festival for the film "Darband (film) | Darband" directed by Parviz Shahbazi, 2012
2. Received an honorary diploma for male acting from 34th Fajr Theater Festival for the play "Original Language" directed by Rasoul Kahani, 2015
3. Acting candidate for the series Eight and a half minutes directed by Shahram Shah Hosseini in Image World Festival, 2016
