= Mafia Nights =

Iranian reality TV series

- Genre: Family; Social; Mystery
- Created by: Saeed Aboutaleb
- Directed by: Saeed Aboutaleb (1-4) Sina Dourandishan (5)
- Presented by: Mohammad Reza Alimardani (1-2, 4-5); Kambiz Dirbaz (3)
- Ending theme: Episode 1–22, 28–57: Mafia Nights by Kaveh Afagh; Episode 23–27: Mafia by Mohammad Reza Alimardani
- Country of origin: Iran
- Original language: Persian
- No. of seasons: 19
- No. of episodes: 57

Production
- Producer: Saeed Aboutaleb (1-4) Mohammad Reza Rezaeean (5)
- Editor: Sina Dourandishan
- Camera setup: Farshid Faraji
- Running time: 90–150 minutes
- Production company: Honare Aval Company

Original release
- Network: Filimo
- Release: November 17, 2020 – present

Mafia Nights (Persian: شب‌های مافیا) is an Iranian reality television series based on the Mafia game. All the players are celebrities and if they do well, they will make it to the finalists season. The first episode was released on Filimo on Tuesday, November 17, 2020.

== General information and rules ==
=== How to do the contest ===
In Mafia Nights, players are divided into two categories: the majority citizen and the mafia minority. Roles that no one knows about from the beginning except the owner and manager, although the Mafia group knows each other on the first night. The goal of the citizens is to take over the city and cleanse it of the mafia, and the victory of the mafia depends on equality with the number of citizens.

The game is played in 2 parts, consecutive nights and days. Every day, everyone plays the role of a citizen and in the process of accusing, defending and voting, they try to discover the Mafia and drive it out of the city with a majority of votes. So, the real role of everyone should not be seen these days, and the players are just trying to accuse the real mafia and defend themselves. During the day, the role of treasure is in the player's pocket. Knowing it by another player or understanding another role at night by cheating or any other application makes the role of the player aimless and causes the player to be fired by the manager. In day-to-day conversations, the role is not important to anyone, and only the citizenship or mafia group in the players' words and behaviors is important.

Every day after the voting, the players who received the most votes are defended by voting in the first round, and by voting in the second round, which takes place in a nap and with their eyes closed, one person leaves the game. In the second round of voting, everyone has a choice. At the end of the voting, the expelled player is randomly drawing from 6 cards to determine a situation for himself or the game, and if he is to leave the game completely, he has the right to say the last word for 20 seconds without directly referring to any role. The player who leaves the game to vote can only return to the game by drawing the "Beautiful Mind" card.

In the night, the mafia group wakes up at the behest of the Mafia Boss and secretly consult for a moment about which citizen to target. After that, the operator wakes up some citizens to carry out their night plans.

=== Roles ===
==== Mafia Group ====
Godfather or Mafia Boss: The godfather or the boss of the Mafia plays the most powerful role among the Mafia's roles, and at night, one of the citizens is directly targeted by him. His inquiry is always negative for the detective.

Dr. Lecter: Dr. Lecter is the second member of the Mafia group and is able to save one of the members of the Mafia from shooting at night by Professional. He can only save himself once.

Joker: Three times during the night, he chooses a member of the Mafia (including Dr. Lecter, the Simple Mafia and himself) or the citizens to reverse that person's inquiry to the detective that night. He can only choose himself once. This role of the finalists was added to the game.

Simple Mafia: Simple Mafia is a member of the Mafia, but it has no unique capabilities.

==== City Group ====
Detective: Every night, one of the people in the game inquires from the manager. The inquiry of Dr. Lecter, the Joker and the simple mafia is positive and the inquiry of the citizens and the head of the mafia is negative. The detective's query will also be reversed for the person the Joker has already selected.

Doctor: The doctor wakes up every night and has to guess who the Mafia shot at and choose him to save. If chosen correctly, that person will stay in the game. He can save his life only once.

Professional: A professional wakes up every night with the announcement of the narrator and can target one of the people in the game who he thinks is the Mafia. If the citizen is targeted by him, he himself is out of the game.

Die-hard: Die-hard did not go out at night with the first bullet of the Mafia and during the day he leaves the game only with the vote of the city. Die-hard twice a night can interrogate people who have left the game.

Psychiatrist: The psychiatrist wakes up every night with the announcement of the narrator, and if he wishes, he can silence one of the people playing twice. The selected person will not be able to speak in the game during the next day.

Mayor: After the initial defense by the defendants of the game, and if he himself is not in the defense, the mayor is able to cancel the voting (no one goes out) or the direct exit vote to one person once during the whole game.

Simple Citizen (two people): The simple citizen is considered a member of the city group and has no unique characteristics or abilities.

=== Cards ===
Green Path: The withdrawn player can give this card to another player, protecting him from voting and defense the next day.

Red Carpet: The withdrawn player gives the card to another player and sends him directly to the defense the next day.

Beautiful Mind: The player leaving the game guesses the role of another player and if he guesses correctly, he returns to the game.

Insomnia: If this card is selected by the player leaving the game, there is no night section at the end of the day and the game goes directly to the next day.

Dizziness or Thirteen Lies: The player leaving the game must tell a game-related lie, and the operator must confirm that it is a lie.

Final shot: The player leaving the game, instead of the Mafia, will shoot the leading night of his choice, and the Mafia will not have the right to shoot that night.

== Participants ==
=== Series 1 ===
==== Season 1 ====
Participant	Episode 1	Episode 2	Episode 3	Individual performance
Participant	Role	Role	Role	Individual performance
Hamed Ahangi	Doctor	Professional	Dr. Lecter	3 wins
Majid Vasheghani	Die-hard	Doctor	Simple Mafia	3 wins
Javad Hashemi	Simple Mafia	Mayor	Detective	1 win, 2 losses
Behrang Alavi	Psychiatrist	Godfather	Professional	1 win, 2 losses
Hadi Kazemi	Detective	Die-hard	Godfather	3 wins
Mohammad Reza Hedayati	Godfather	Simple citizen	Simple Citizen	1 win, 2 losses
Reza Shafiei Jam	Simple Mafia	Simple Citizen	Psychiatrist	1 win, 2 losses
Bijan Banafshekhah	Simple Citizen	Simple Mafia	Mayor	1 win, 2 losses
Hooman Hajiabdollahi	Professional	Detective	Die-hard	2 wins, 1 loss
Kaveh Khodashenas	Dr. Lecter	Psychiatrist	Simple Mafia	2 wins, 1 loss
Emad Talebzadeh	Mayor	Dr. Lecter	Doctor	1 win, 2 losses
Mir-Taher Mazloomi	Simple Citizen	Simple Mafia	Simple Citizen	1 win, 2 losses
Winner	City Group	City Group	Mafia Group	

==== Season 2 ====
Participant	Episode 1	Episode 2	Episode 3	Individual performance
Participant	Role	Role	Role	Individual performance
Maryam Momen	Dr. Lecter	Professional	Simple Citizen	3 losses
Nasim Adabi	Die-hard	Die-hard	Professional	1 win, 2 losses
Shaghayegh Dehghan	Simple Citizen	Mayor	Die-hard	1 win, 2 losses
Sima Tirandaz	Doctor	Godfather	Simple Mafia	3 wins
Roya Mirelmi	Simple Citizen	Simple Mafia	Mayor	2 wins, 1 loss
Samaneh Pakdel	Simple Mafia	Doctor	Detective	3 losses
Azita Torkashvand	Professional	Dr. Lecter	Doctor	2 wins, 1 loss
Khatereh Hatami	Simple Mafia	Simple Citizen	Psychiatrist	3 losses
Samira Hassanpour	Godfather	Simple Mafia	Simple Citizen	1 win, 2 losses
Shabnam Farshadjoo	Detective	Detective	Godfather	2 wins, 1 loss
Shahrzad Kamalzadeh	Mayor	Psychiatrist	Dr. Lecter	2 wins, 1 loss
Gloria Hardy	Psychiatrist	Simple Citizen	Simple Mafia	2 wins, 1 loss
Winner	City Group	Mafia Group	Mafia Group	

==== Season 3 ====
Participant	Episode 1	Episode 2	Episode 3	Individual performance
Participant	Role	Role	Role	Individual performance
Behnam Tashakkor	Mayor	Professional	Godfather	1 win, 2 losses
Omid Hajili	Godfather	Godfather	Simple Citizen	2 wins, 1 loss
Amir Mahdi Jule	Dr. Lecter	Doctor	Professional	1 win, 2 losses
Hooman Barghnavard	Simple Citizen	Simple Mafia	Psychiatrist	1 win, 2 losses
Hossein Mehri	Psychiatrist	Dr. Lecter	Doctor	1 win, 2 losses
Kamran Tafti	Detective	Simple Citizen	Simple Mafia	1 win, 2 losses
Nima Raeesi	Simple Citizen	Psychiatrist	Mayor	3 losses
Shahab Abbasi	Doctor	Simple Mafia	Detective	1 win, 2 losses
Amir Karbalaeizadeh	Die-hard	Mayor	Dr. Lecter	1 win, 2 losses
Ehsan Karimi	Simple Mafia	Die-hard	Simple Citizen	1 win, 2 losses
Mehdi Koushki	Professional	Detective	Simple Mafia	1 win, 2 losses
Ramin Naser Nasir	Simple Mafia	Simple Citizen	Die-hard	1 win, 2 losses
Winner	Mafia Group	Mafia Group	Mafia Group	

==== Season 4 (Final 1) ====
Participant	Episode 1	Episode 2	Episode 3	Individual performance
Participant	Role	Role	Role	Individual performance
Hamed Ahangi	Mayor	Godfather	Doctor	2 win, 1 loss
Majid Vasheghani	Simple Mafia	Mayor	Simple Citizen	2 wins, 1 loss
Maryam Momen	Simple Mafia	Doctor	Simple Citizen	2 wins, 1 loss
Javad Hashemi	Doctor	Detective	Psychiatrist	3 wins
Behnam Tashakkor	Psychiatrist	Simple Mafia	Professional	2 win, 1 loss
Omid Hajili	Simple Citizen	Simple Citizen	Simple Mafia	2 wins, 1 loss
Amir Mahdi Jule	Godfather	Psychiatrist	Mayor	2 wins, 1 loss
Hadi Kazemi	Detective	Professional	Dr. Lecter	2 wins, 1 loss
Sima Tirandaz	Simple Citizen	Dr. Lecter	Simple Mafia	1 win, 2 loss
Hossein Mehri	Professional	Simple Citizen	Godfather	2 wins, 1 loss
Shahrzad Kamalzadeh	Die-hard	Simple Mafia	Die-hard	2 wins, 1 loss
Samaneh Pakdel	Dr. Lecter	Die-hard	Detective	2 win, 1 loss
Winner	City Group	City Group	City Group	

=== Series 2 ===
==== Season 1 ====
Participant	Episode 1	Episode 2	Episode 3	Individual performance
Participant	Role	Role	Role	Individual performance
Nima Shahrokh Shahi	Detective	Simple Mafia	Godfather	2 wins, 1 loss
Pejman Bazeghi	Professional	Godfather	Die-hard	1 win, 2 losses
Farzad Hassani	Psychiatrist	Doctor	Dr. Lecter	1 win, 2 losses
Reza Davood Nejad	Dr. Lecter	Simple Citizen	Simple Citizen	1 win, 2 losses
Mehrab GhasemKhani	Simple Citizen	Dr. Lecter	Doctor	1 win, 2 losses
Firouz Karimi	Godfather	Psychiatrist	Detective	1 win, 2 losses
Mohammad Naderi	Doctor	Die-hard	Simple Mafia	1 win, 2 losses
Hossein Omidi	Simple Mafia	Mayor	Simple Citizen	1 win, 2 losses
Soroush Jamshidi	Mayor	Professional	Mayor	3 losses
Javad Khajavi	Simple Mafia	Simple Citizen	Professional	1 win, 2 losses
Nader Soleimani	Die-hard	Detective	Psychiatrist	3 losses
Hamed Homayoun	Simple Citizen	Simple Mafia	Simple Mafia	2 wins, 1 losses
Winner	Mafia Group	Mafia Group	Mafia Group	

==== Season 2 ====
Participant	Episode 1	Episode 2	Episode 3	Individual performance
Participant	Role	Role	Role	Individual performance
Nasrin Moghanloo	Detective	Simple Mafia	Psychiatrist	2 wins, 1 loss
Negar Foroozandeh	Simple Citizen	Dr. Lecter	Simple Mafia	1 win, 2 losses
Hadis Fooladvand	Dr. Lecter	Die-hard	Simple Citizen	2 wins, 1 loss
Asha Mehrabi	Die-hard	Detective	Professional	1 win, 2 losses
Maedeh Tahmasebi	Godfather	Simple Citizen	Mayor	2 wins, 1 loss
Fariba Naderi	Simple Mafia	Godfather	Detective	3 wins
Solmaz Ghani	Psychiatrist	Mayor	Dr. Lecter	3 losses
Sara Monjezi	Simple Citizen	Professional	Doctor	1 win, 2 losses
Nafiseh Roshan	Simple Mafia	Simple Citizen	Die-hard	2 wins, 1 loss
Sogol Tahmasebi	Mayor	Doctor	Simple Citizen	1 win, 2 losses
Niki Mozaffari	Professional	Psychiatrist	Godfather	3 losses
Saghar Ghana'at	Doctor	Simple Mafia	Simple Mafia	1 win, 2 losses
Winner	Mafia Group	Mafia Group	City Group	

==== Season 3 ====
Participant	Episode 1	Episode 2	Episode 3	Individual performance
Participant	Role	Role	Role	Individual performance
Khodadad Azizi	Simple Citizen	Doctor	Die-hard	2 wins, 1 loss
Kambiz Dirbaz	Simple Citizen	Professional	Dr. Lecter	1 win, 2 losses
Sepand Amirsoleimani	Detective	Simple Citizen	Simple Mafia	1 win, 2 losses
Mohammad Motamedi	Simple Mafia	Detective	Godfather	2 wins, 1 loss
Alireza Ostadi	Doctor	Simple Mafia	Simple Citizen	1 win, 2 losses
Arsalan Ghasemi	Die-hard	Simple Mafia	Professional	1 win, 2 losses
Yousef Teymouri	Dr. Lecter	Die-hard	Simple Citizen	3 wins
Sam Derakhshani	Godfather	Simple Citizen	Psychiatrist	3 wins
Rambod Shekarabi	Simple Mafia	Psychiatrist	Mayor	3 wins
Shahram Ghaedi	Professional	Dr. Lecter	Detective	1 win, 2 losses
Majid Mozaffari	Psychiatrist	Mayor	Doctor	2 wins, 1 loss
Rahim Norouzi	Mayor	Godfather	Simple Mafia	3 losses
Winner	Mafia Group	City Group	City Group	

==== Season 4 (Final 2) ====
Participant	Episode 1	Episode 2	Episode 3	Individual performance
Participant	Role	Role	Role	Individual performance
Khodadad Azizi	Mayor	Doctor	Dr. Lecter	2 wins, 1 loss
Kambiz Dirbaz	Professional	Psychiatrist	Godfather	2 wins, 1 loss
Nima Shahrokh Shahi	Detective	Godfather	Simple Mafia	1 win, 2 losses
Farzad Hassani	Simple Mafia	Professional	Simple Mafia	1 win, 2 losses
Reza Davood Nejad	Die-hard	Dr. Lecter	Mayor	2 wins, 1 loss
Arsalan Ghasemi	Dr. Lecter	Die-hard	Detective	2 wins, 1 loss
Asha Mehrabi	Doctor	Simple Mafia	Doctor	2 wins, 1 loss
Sara Monjezi	Simple Mafia	Simple Citizen	Psychiatrist	2 wins, 1 loss
Sam Derakhshani	Psychiatrist	Simple Mafia	Professional	2 wins, 1 loss
Hossein Omidi	Godfather	Simple Citizen	Simple Citizen	2 wins, 1 loss
Nafiseh Roshan	Simple Citizen	Detective	Die-hard	3 wins
Fariba Naderi	Simple Citizen	Mayor	Simple Citizen	3 wins
Winner	City Group	City Group	City Group	

==== Season 5 (Final of Finalists 1) ====
Participant	Episode 1	Episode 2	Episode 3	Individual performance
Participant	Role	Role	Role	Individual performance
Majid Vasheghani	Dr. Lecter	Doctor	Godfather	1 win, 2 losses
Maryam Momen	Simple Citizen	Mayor	Joker	2 wins, 1 loss
Javad Hashemi	Joker	Psychiatrist	Dr. Lecter	1 win, 2 losses
Khodadad Azizi	Doctor	Simple Citizen	Professional	3 wins
Kambiz Dirbaz	Godfather	Detective	Die-hard	2 wins, 1 loss
Amir Mahdi Jule	Simple Mafia	Simple Citizen	Doctor	2 wins, 1 loss
Farzad Hassani	Mayor	Godfather	Detective	2 wins, 1 loss
Reza Davood Nejad	Simple Citizen	Dr. Lecter	Psychiatrist	2 wins, 1 loss
Hossein Mehri	Professional	Simple Mafia	Simple Mafia	1 win, 2 losses
Asha Mehrabi	Detective	Joker	Simple Citizen	2 wins, 1 loss
Sam Derakhshani	Die-hard	Professional	Simple Citizen	3 wins
Sara Monjezi	Psychiatrist	Die-hard	Mayor	3 wins
Winner	City Group	City Group	City Group	

Hamed Ahangi and Sima Tirandaz were also invited to participate in the finalists, but the two could not attend the finalists due to their busy schedule.

=== Series 3 ===
==== Season 5 (Final of Finalists 2) ====
Participant	Episode 1	Episode 2	Episode 3	Individual performance
Participant	Role	Role	Role	Individual performance
Amirali Nabavian	Detective	Dr. Lecter	Doctor	2 wins, 1 loss
Bahareh Afshari	Simple Citizen	Joker	Mayor	1 win, 2 losses
Pouria Poursorkh	Professional	Doctor	Dr. Lecter	3 losses
Nima Shahrokh Shahi	Salesman	Simple Citizen	Die-hard	1 win, 2 losses
Omid Hajili	Joker	Simple Mafia	Joker	2 wins, 1 loss
Tarlan Parvaneh	Simple Citizen	Godfather	Detective	2 wins, 1 loss
Behnam Tashakkor	Simple Mafia	Psychiatrist	Simple Mafia	1 win, 2 losses
Pejman Bazeghi	Doctor	Die-hard	Simple Citizen	2 wins, 1 loss
Negar Forouzandeh	Mayor	Professional	Psychiatrist	1 win, 2 losses
Borzou Arjmand	Godfather	Simple Citizen	Simple Citizen	3 wins
Arsalan Ghasemi	Psychiatrist	Detective	Professional	1 win, 2 losses
Majid Yaser	Dr. Lecter	Mayor	Salesman	2 wins, 1 loss
Samaneh Pakdel	Die-hard	Salesman	Godfather	3 losses
Winner	Mafia Group	Mafia Group	City Group	

=== Series 4 ===
==== Season 3 ====
Participant	Episode 1	Episode 2	Episode 3	Individual performance
Participant	Role	Role	Role	Individual performance
Hamed Ahangi	Simple Citizen	Godfather	Doctor	1 wins, 2 losses
Majid Vasheghani	Detective	Die-hard	Dr. Lecter	1 wins, 2 losses
Salar Aghili	Professional	Simple Citizen	Godfather	1 wins, 2 losses
Ali Salehi	Psychiatrist	Mayor	Professional	2 wins, 1 loss
Abbas Ghazali	Simple Mafia	Detective	Die-hard	3 wins
Iraj Nozari	Doctor	Simple Mafia	Detective	1 win, 2 losses
Amir Hossein Modares	Simple Mafia	Dr. Lecter	Mayor	2 wins, 1 loss
Hossein Rafiee	Dr. Lecter	Doctor	Simple Citizen	3 wins
Ramtin Khodapanahi	Simple Citizen	Simple Mafia	Psychiatrist	1 wins, 2 losses
Hesam Navab Safavi	Godfather	Professional	Simple Citizen	3 wins
Amir Mohammad Zand	Mayor	Psychiatrist	Simple Mafia	1 wins, 2 losses
Yousef Sayyadi	Die-hard	Simple Citizen	Simple Mafia	1 wins, 2 losses
Winner	Mafia Group	City Group	City Group	

==== Season 5 (Final of Finalists 3) ====
Participant	Episode 1	Episode 2	Episode 3	Individual performance
Participant	Role	Role	Role	Individual performance
Hamed Ahangi	Sleepwalker	Bodyguard	Doctor	2 wins, 1 loss
Majid Vasheghani	Bodyguard	Sleepwalker	Mayor	2 wins, 1 loss
Maryam Momen	Salesman	Psychiatrist	Dr. Lecter	2 wins, 1 loss
Pouria Poursorkh	Joker	Professional	Psychiatrist	2 wins, 1 loss
Khodadad Azizi	Dr. Lecter	Mayor	Godfather	1 wins, 2 losses
Falamak Joneidi	Professional	Joker	Die-hard	2 wins, 1 loss
Iman Safa	Mayor	Detective	Joker	2 wins, 1 loss
Kamand Amirsoleimani	Godfather	Die-hard	Professional	2 wins, 1 loss
Hossein Mehri	Doctor	Dr. Lecter	Bodyguard	1 win, 2 losses
Asha Mehrabi	Detective	Godfather	Salesman	2 wins, 1 loss
Ali Oji	Die-hard	Salesman	Sleepwalker	3 wins
Linda Kiani	Psychiatrist	Doctor	Detective	3 wins
Winner	City Group	City Group	City Group	

== Release ==
=== Review of series ===
Series	Season	Day and time of broadcast	The beginning of the season	The end of the season	God of the game	Number of episodes broadcast	Episode range	Distributor
1	1	Tuesdays 08:00	17 November 2020	1 December 2020	Mohammad Reza Alimardani	3	1–3	Filimo
1	2	Tuesdays 08:00	8 December 2020	22 December 2020	Mohammad Reza Alimardani	3	4–6	Filimo
1	3	Tuesdays 08:00	29 December 2020	12 January 2021	Mohammad Reza Alimardani	3	7–9	Filimo
1	4 (Final 1)	Tuesdays 08:00	19 January 2021	2 February 2021	Mohammad Reza Alimardani	3	10–12	Filimo
2	5	Saturdays and Sundays 08:00	20 March 2021	27 March 2021	Mohammad Reza Alimardani	3	13–15	Filimo
2	6	Saturdays and Sundays 08:00	28 March 2021	4 April 2021	Mohammad Reza Alimardani	3	16–18	Filimo
2	7	Saturdays and Sundays 08:00	10 April 2021	17 April 2021	Mohammad Reza Alimardani	3	19–21	Filimo
2	8 (Final 2)	Saturdays, Sundays and Fridays 08:00	18 April 2021	30 April 2021	Mohammad Reza Alimardani	3	22–24	Filimo
2	9 (Final of Finalists 1)	Fridays 08:00	7 May 2021	21 May 2021	Mohammad Reza Alimardani	3	25–27	Filimo
3	10	Mondays 08:00	12 July 2021	26 July 2021	Kambiz Dirbaz	3	28–30	Filimo
3	11	Mondays 08:00	2 August 2021	16 August 2021	Kambiz Dirbaz	3	31–33	Filimo
3	12	Mondays 08:00	23 August 2021	6 September 2021	Kambiz Dirbaz	3	34–36	Filimo
3	13 (Final 3)	Mondays 08:00	20 September 2021	4 October 2021	Kambiz Dirbaz	3	37–39	Filimo
3	14 (Final of Finalists 2)	Mondays 08:00	11 October 2021	24 October 2021	Kambiz Dirbaz	3	40–42	Filimo
4	15	Sundays 08:00	20 March 2022	3 April 2022	Mohammad Reza Alimardani	3	43–45	Filimo
4	16	Sundays 08:00	10 April 2022	24 April 2022	Mohammad Reza Alimardani	3	46–48	Filimo
4	17	Tuesdays 08:00	3 May 2022	17 May 2022	Mohammad Reza Alimardani	3	49–51	Filimo
4	18 (Final 4)	Tuesdays 08:00	31 May 2022	14 June 2022	Mohammad Reza Alimardani	3	52–54	Filimo
4	19 (Final of Finalists 3)	Tuesdays 08:00	28 June 2022	12 July 2022	Mohammad Reza Alimardani	3	55–57	Filimo
5	20				Mohammad Reza Alimardani	4	58–61	Filimo

== Reception ==
=== Critical response ===
Players like Hamed Ahangi, Amirali Nabavian, Majid Vasheghani, Bahareh Afshari, Iman Safa, Hossein Mehri, Maryam Momen were praised for their intelligence, confidence, logic and power of speech. All of them were in the finalist seasons of their respective series which only top players can participate.

Digikala ranked the top players in art and cinema section of their website in this order:

1. Hamed Ahangi "The Best Player"

2. Bahareh Afshari "The Most Unrivaled Female Player"

3. Majid Vasheghani

4. Hossein Soleimani "The Most Popular Male Player"

5. Amirali Nabavian "The Most Confident Player"

6. Iman Safa "The Loudest Player"

GrapHall ranked the top 10 players as below:

Bahareh Afshari 8.5/10

Amirali Nabavian 8/10

Hamed Ahangi 7.5/10

Maryam Momen, Khodadad Azizi, Pouria Poursorkh 7/10

Iman Safa, Hossein Mehri, Omid Hajili 6.5/10

Majid Vasheghani 6/10

== Controversy ==
=== Cheating ===
During the broadcast of the series, the audience suspected that cheating was taking place in some episodes because some players on the first day of the game, without any reason or reasoning and with complete confidence, targeted three or four people, and all of them were mafia.

In the third episode of the fourth season of the fourth series, Linda Kiani, who is always a quiet player and doesn't give strong reasons in her play and usually plays sensuously–she was very quiet in the fifth season of the fourth series that even several times some players like Hamed Ahangi and Khodadad Azizi asked her why is she not active in the game–insisted a lot on the fact that Iman Safa is a mafia and she didn't give a strong reason. At the last minutes, she also found the last mafia who was completely hidden and no one had said anything about him. During the game, Linda gestured to the three remaining citizens and convinced them to vote for Iman to leave. In this episode, they had an argument. Linda told him "A good player can play smartly without making a fuss." Iman answered "I'm not a good player because I can't say as smartly as you that I saw (the mafia), so follow my lead and I don't know how to make a link from there to here between other players." This episode brought a lot of criticism from the audience, because people believed that Linda had cheated, and Iman also stated this in his words. The audience criticized the god of the game, Mohammad Reza Alimardani, because Linda communicated with the rest of the players with her sign language and eye contacts during the day and she should have been kicked out of the game according to the rules of the game.

In the second episode of the fifth season of the fourth series, the mafia were quickly found without a strong reason. On the third day of the game, Hamed Ahangi who was a mafia in that game, asked the first person, Majid Vasheghani, for permission to speak (challenge) and said "On the first day, when no information has reached anyone at night and no one has provided any strong reason, I do not accept that someone stands up and names someone as a mafia and most players agree on that person to go out of the game. This is not my game. I am a mafia and I won't be killed by the first shot at night because of my ability (bodyguard). Vote me out today."

After he finished speaking, Mohammad Reza Alimardani, the god of the game, told him that he should leave the game due to the revelation of his role.

After the airing of this episode, everyone was convinced that the game was rigged and because Majid Vasheghani had suggested to vote for the first mafia, Hossein Mehri, on the first day, he was severely attacked in social networks by the viewers of the series. Also, before the start of the game, when the players usually talk about the previous game and make comments or joke with each other, two players, Iman Safa and Majid Vasheghani, made jokes about Hamed before the start of this episode, which the audience called it mocking. Both received many negative comments because of their behavior.

Hossein Mehri, who was removed from the game by the players' vote at the beginning of the game, wrote on his Instagram "I will reveal everything about Mafia Nights soon."

Film News, a reliable news media in Iran, called this episode "The darkest night of Mafia Nights." with publishing the part of Hamed's words before leaving the game on Instagram.

Iman Safa wrote a comment under that post and said "In my opinion, it was by far the worst and most immoral game in the entire Mafia Nights series. Hamed now understands what happened to me in the third episode of the fourth season of the fourth series."

Following the attack of negative comments of the audience on the official Instagram page of the Mafia Nights series, people criticized and said that this episode should not have been aired because it was clearly rigged and even two players, Iman Safa and Maryam Momen, after finishing the game, said that it was a bad episode and they did not enjoy the game. The official page of Mafia Nights series published a part of the next unreleased episode with the caption "Hamed Ahangi apologized for his behavior in the previous episode". In that video, before the start of the new game, Hamed said "In the previous game, something happened that made me nervous and I revealed my role, which is respectable for me. I want you to know that this was my first time and I hope it will be my last. I love you all. I am not a good player at all and I am really learning from you. I hope you are not upset with me and especially my teammates who were mafia with me."

This video again brought strong criticism from the audience. The audience said that Hamed did not apologize for his behavior because he had done nothing wrong, but Mafia Nights series published this video with this caption to deny the frauds. While it was rigged and even the players had confirmed it.

Following this video, Hamed posted a story on his Instagram and said "I apologized to the dear viewers, because people are always respectable to me, I wish the cheaters would apologize too. Apologizing does not make a person weak."

In this story, he directly confirmed the fraud.

Following the negative comments and accusations of cheating against Majid Vasheghani, he posted a video of himself on Instagram and explained that he asked Hamed Ahangi if he meant him about cheating and Hamed told him no. Regarding the jokes of before the start of the game, he also said that he is very close with Hamed and he always jokes with Hamed in a serious tone and because the audience does not know about their friendship and their jokes with each other, it caused them to misunderstand.

Under the same post of Majid, Hamed wrote a comment for him "Majid you are my good friend. I didn't mean you. You are an excellent player." Majid replied him "I know what it was, what happened and what you said. You are a good friend and brother, which is much more beautiful and important than being a player."

Then Hamed posted a story on his Instagram and wrote that Majid Vasheghani and Iman Safa are excellent players without cheating.

On July 13, 2022, Hossein Mehri went live on Instagram and said "In the second episode, things happened that I preferred to tell people. When we recorded the program, I told Mr. Saeed Aboutaleb, the audience will definitely not like this episode, but he had a different opinion. Unfortunately, when the game started and four of the players spoke, I saw that two of the players looked outside and almost got confirmation, and I also saw who the interface person was. I made it clear right there in front of everyone (which was removed from the episode), the atmosphere became a bit heavy and the players who were mafia were upset that cheating was taking place. The citizens were also upset and those people who cheated were a little worried and this did not create a good atmosphere for the game. I will never name those two players, because in the end it was just a game anyway. From the very beginning, it was clear that I was a mafia, and some help had arrived, and that's why Hamed Ahangi made this decision after I left, and that was the end of the story."

On July 28, 2022, Hamed had an interview with TV Plus and was asked about Mafia Nights. He said that the game has many flaws and in the middle of the game, players can request to stop the game for any reason, such as using the WC. He said that the stoppage of the game causes the players to move around and it has happened many times, for example, before the stoppage of the game, a player accused Iman Safa of being 80% mafia, and after the stoppage of the game, he completely forgot the previous accusation and he accuses Hamed of being a 100% mafia without any reason.

His words led the fans to attack Ali Oji, who made exactly these two accusations in that episode. Ali Oji had been also seriously accused of being a cheater before because he plays without reason and his targets were always correct.

In the continuation of his words, Hamed said that some players bring a person with them behind the stage and show them signs and cheat. Even mobile phones are not taken from the players and they also cheat by receiving messages from people behind the scenes.

On August 6, 2022, the official Instagram page of the Mafia Nights series posted a photo of Saeed Aboutaleb, the creator, director and producer of Mafia Nights, and wrote in the caption that he will be doing a live stream soon, and will explain somethings about the comments of some players on the game.

On August 20, 2022, Filimo renewed Mafia Nights for the fifth series and it will be directed by Sina Dourandishan, produced by Mohammad Reza Rezaeean and Saeed Aboutaleb has left the Mafia Nights series.

On August 22, 2022, at 8:00 PM, Aboutaleb went live on Instagram and said "I spoke to players who said the game was rigged. They said the problem was not with me and our team, the problem was with the players themselves and it's not related to the people behind the scenes. Mafia nights had become repetitive for the audience due to the large number of episodes and seasons and the usual rules and methods. Our team no longer continues Mafia Nights series and we started making The Godfather series with new rules, methods and night scenarios. This show has changed a lot and it's very different from Mafia Nights. Our platform for streaming The Godfather series is Filmnet. The number of players is eleven, including three mafia, seven citizens and one independent. We have nothing to do with the continuation of Mafia Nights and we wish success and luck to their new team."

== Soundtrack ==
Kaveh Afagh and Mohammad Reza Alimardani have sung pieces separately for "Mafia Nights", which were broadcast over the final credits. The soundtrack is composed by Amin Malek.
