= Hajili =

Hajili is a surname. Notable people with the surname include:

- Arif Hajili (born 1962), Azerbaijani politician
- Hajiagha Hajili (born 1998), Azerbaijani footballer
- Omid Hajili (born 1983) Iranian singer
