= Behnam Tashakkor =

Iranian actor (born 1977)

- بهنام تشکر
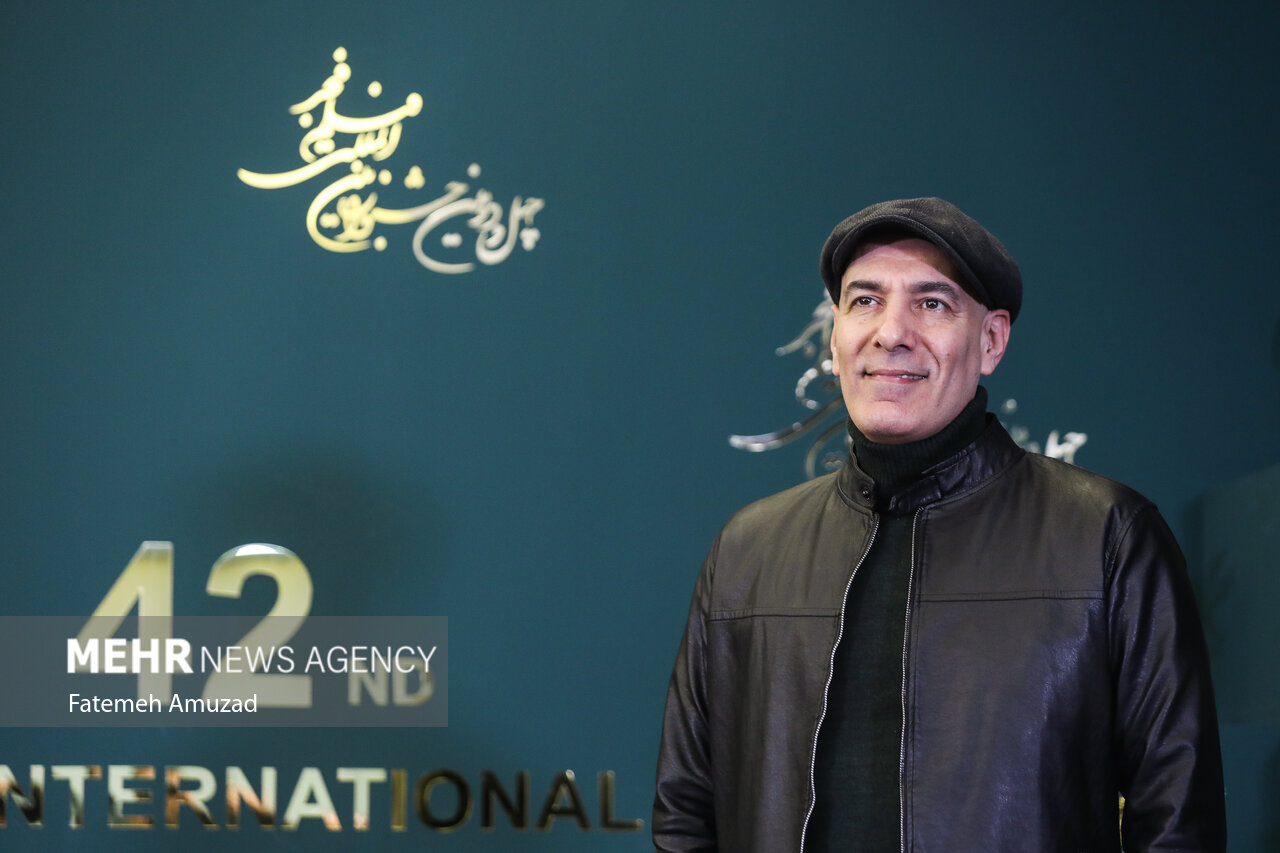
- Tashakkor at the 2024 Fajr International Film Festival
- Born: January 24, 1977 (age 49); Bandar Anzali, Gilan, Iran
- Occupation: Actor
- Height: 1.87 m (6 ft 2 in)

Behnam Tashakkor (Persian: بهنام تشکر; born January 24, 1977) is an Iranian actor.

== Early life ==
He was born on January 24, 1977, in Bandar Anzali to an Ardabili Azeri family. He spent his childhood in the city of Hashtpar.

He started his activity in theater by playing in a comedy show in Sari named "Mirza Ferfere" in 1996. He got his bachelor's degree in business economics from Azad university of Firuzkuh.

== Filmography ==
=== Film ===
Year	Title	Role	Director	Notes
2010	The House Under the Water		Sepideh Farsi	
2011	Goodbye		Mohammad Rasoulof	
2013	Give Back	Sepahbod Zarei	Ali Ghafari	
2014	Hussain Who Said No	Husayn ibn Tamim	Ahmad Reza Darvish	
2015	Don't Forget Your Childhood	Amir Hamedi	Jalal Fatemi	
2016	Red Nail Polish	Arsalan	Seyyed Jamal Seyyed Hatami	
2018	Nostalgia Celebration	Reza	Pourya Azarbayjani	
2019	Prisoners	Bijan	Masoud Dehnamaki	
2024	Paradise of Criminals		Masoud Jafari Jozani	
2024	Parviz Khan		Ali Saghafi	
2024	Projectionist		Ghorban Ali Taherfar	
TBA	Lost		Maryam Barzegar	

=== Web ===
Year	Title	Role	Director	Platform
2012–2018	Made in Iran	Kourosh Afsharjam	Mohammad Hossein Latifi, Borzou Niknejad	Golrang Resaneh
2014–2015	Fool	Agha Bozorg	Kamal Tabrizi	
2020–2021	Mafia Nights	Himself	Saeed Aboutaleb	Filimo
2021	Iranian Dinner	Himself	Saeed Aboutaleb	Filimo
2021	Dracula	Mr. Moafagh	Mehran Modiri	Filimo, Namava
2021–2022	Island	Reza	Sirous Moghaddam	Filimo
2021–2022	Joker	Himself	Ehsan Alikhani	Filimo
2022	Antenna	Mohammad Motamedi	Ebrahim Amerian	Namava
2022	Battle	Himself	Behnam Tashakor	Namava
2022–2023	The Godfather	Himself	Saeed Aboutaleb	Filmnet
2022–2023	Secret Army	Himself	Saeed Aboutaleb	Filimo
2023	Z	Himself	Saeed Aboutaleb	Tamashakhaneh
2023	You Only Go Around Once		Soroush Sehhat	Filimo, Namava
2024	Mafia Nights: Zodiac	Himself	Mohammad Reza Rezaeean	Filimo
2024	Oscar	Himself	Mehran Modiri	Filimo

=== Television ===
Year	Title	Role	Director	Network	Notes	Ref(s)
2011	Doctors' Building	Nima Afshar	Soroush Sehhat	IRIB TV3	TV series	
2012	The Thief and the Police	Naser Kazemi / Amir Farazmand	Saeed Aghakhani	IRIB TV3	TV series	
2013–2021	Chimney	Nosrat Souzanchian	Mohammad Hossein Latifi, Borzou Niknezjad	IRIB TV1	TV series	
2013	Pejman	Psychologist	Soroush Sehhat	IRIB TV3	TV series	
2014	Seven Stones	Rouzbeh Zabih Lari	Alireza Bazrafshan	IRIB TV3	TV series	
2016–2018	Bachelors	Farid Rahimi	Soroush Sehhat	IRIB TV3	TV series	
2023	Mastooran 2	Nowzar	Seyed Ali Hashemi	IRIB TV1		
