= Mina Lakani =

Iranian actress

- مینا لاکانی
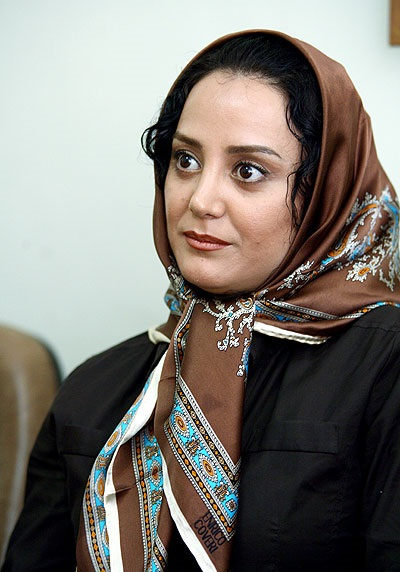
- Lakani in 2006
- Born: 20 September 1969 (age 56); Tehran, Iran
- Occupation: Actress
- Years active: 1992–2010
- Spouse: Amin Zendegani (m. 1997; div. 2004)

Mina Lakani (born September 20, 1969) is an Iranian actress known for her work in theater and cinema.

== Career ==
Lakani made her theater debut with a role in Hamlet, directed by Qutbuddin Sadeghi. Her cinematic journey began with an appearance in the film Remember the Flight, directed by Hamid Rakhshani. She gained significant recognition for her performance in the film Didar, directed by Mohammad-Reza Honarmand, earning her the Crystal Simorgh and an Honorary Diploma for Best Leading Actress at the 13th Fajr Film Festival in 1994.

== Immigration to the United States ==
In October 2011, Mina Lakani appeared without a headscarf on Shabahang, a live program on Voice of America’s Persian television network. During an interview with the host, she revealed that she had left Iran and immigrated to the United States due to oppressive working conditions and in solidarity with the Iranian people’s protest movement against the prevailing political establishment.

== Personal life ==
Mina Lakani married Amin Zandegani, an Iranian film and television actor, in 1997. They met while co-starring in the film Eastern Woman. However, their marriage was short-lived, ending in divorce after seven years.

== Filmography ==
=== Theater ===
- Hamlet

=== Cinema ===
- Remember the Flight (1992)
- Angel’s Day (1993)
- The Encounter (1994)
- Eastern Woman (1997) [1]
- Die Hard (1997) [1]

=== Television ===
Year	Title	Role	Director	Notes
2009–2010	Tavan	Actor	Shahram Shah-Hosseini	As "Marjan Amini"
2008	Taraneh Madari	Actor	Hossein Soheilizadeh	As "Samira"
2008	Begu Ke Roya Nist (TV movie)	Actor	Mehdi Golestaneh	Channel 2
2006	Akharin Gonah	Actor	Hossein Soheilizadeh	As "Roya Akrami"
2005	Roozhaye Eteraz	Actor	Hossein Soheilizadeh	Channel 2
2004–2005	Hamsafaran	Actor	Ali Jakan, Mohsen Mohseni-Nasab	Channel 3
2002–2003	Sarzamin Royaha	Actor	Masoud Rashidi, Hamid Ghadakchian	
2001–2002	Parimah (TV movie)	Actor	Masoud Abparvar	Channel 2
2000	Dar Poost-e Shir (TV theater)	Actor	Shoreh Lorestani	Channel 2
1998–1999	Zir-e Bazarcheh	Actor	Reza Zhian	Channel 2
1996	Kasb o Kar-e Aghaye Fabrizi (TV theater)	Actor	Mohammadreza Khaki	Writer: Albert Housson, TV Director: Masoud Forootan

== Awards and honors ==
- Winner of the Crystal Simorgh for Best Actress for her performance in The Encounter (1994)
- Nominated for the Golden Statuette for Best Actress at the Second Cinema House Festival for her performance in The Encounter (1998)
