= The Glass Eye =

The Glass Eye (Persian: چشم شیشه‌ای, romanized: Cheshm-e Shisheyi) is a 1991 film by the Iranian director Hossein Ghasemi Jami. Jami also wrote the script for the film which starred Alireza Eshaghi, Javad Hashemi and Asghar Naghizadeh. Set in the context of the Iran-Iraq war, this is an example of Sacred Defence cinema.
