= The Crab (2023 film) =

- Persian: خرچنگ
- Directed by: Mostafa Shayesteh
- Written by: Amir Hossein Davatgar; Mostafa Zandi
- Produced by: Yaser Jafari
- Starring: Hamed Ahangi; Hamid Goodarzi; Gohar Kheirandish; Mohammadreza Alimardani; Kamand Amirsoleimani; Alireza Ostadi; Reza Naji; Shaghayegh Farahani; Shohreh Soltani; Elham Farashah; Hediyeh Bazvand
- Cinematography: Mohammadreza Sokoot
- Edited by: Kaveh Imani
- Music by: Hamidreza Sadri
- Distributed by: Hedayat Film
- Release date: 23 June 2023
- Running time: 110 minutes
- Country: Iran
- Language: Persian

The Crab (Persian: خرچنگ ; Kharchang) is a 2023 Iranian comedy film directed by Mostafa Shayesteh. This film began screening in Iranian cinemas on January 15, 2025.

== Plot ==
A young man (Hamed Ahangi) is looking for rich old women to marry and pocket a huge amount of money and wealth after their deaths.

== Cast ==
- Hamed Ahangi as Saeed
- Hamid Goodarzi as Parham
- Gohar Kheirandish as Pari Samsami
- Mohammadreza Alimardani as Nader
- Kamand Amirsoleimani as Sima
- Alireza Ostadi as Majid
- Reza Naji as Eghbal
- Shaghayegh Farahani as Tala
- Shohreh Soltani as Janan
- Elham Farashah as Azar
- Hediyeh Bazvand
- Fatemeh Shokri
- Hamid Asghari
- Roya Vahdati
- Mahsa Kamyabi
- Mohammad Reza Alirezai
- Bita Aalemi
- Amir Hossein Lavafzadeh
- Mitra Yektafar
- Atefeh Hosseinzadeh
