= Prisoners (2018 film) =

- Directed by: Masoud Dehnamaki
- Written by: Masoud Dehnamaki
- Produced by: Dehnamaki, Masoud
- Edited by: Khashayar Movahedian
- Production company: Owj Arts and Media Organization
- Distributed by: Owj Arts and Media Organization
- Release date: 16 March 2018
- Running time: 100 minutes
- Country: Iran
- Language: Persian

Prisoners is an Iranian feature film directed, written and produced by Masoud Dehnamaki; it was released in 2018. The film is a comedy and satire with a social theme and moral meaning. The film is also referred to in English as Executions (with a 2019 release date).

== Premise ==
A student plans to research the prisoners of Qasr Prison for his thesis.

== Cast ==
- Behnam Tashakkor
- Hooman Barghnavard
- Hedayat Hashemi
- Bahareh Afshari
- Behnoosh Bakhtiari
- Asghar Naghizadeh
- Rasoul Najafian
- Amir Nouri

== Technical team ==
The production team included Masoud Dehnamaki (producer and director), Alireza Najafzadeh (project manager), Amir Ebrahimi (production manager), Farshad Gol-Sefidi (director of photography), Shahram Khalaj (makeup designer), Farshid Ahmadi (sound engineer), Khashayar Movahedian (editor), Behzad Jafari (set & costume designer), Omid Jezini (planner & first assistant director), Omid Sohrabi (media consultant), Iman Karamian (field special effects), Saeed Khalili (visual special effects), Hassan Shojaei (photographer), and Javad Ghasemi (procurement manager). It was produced by the Film and Series Center of the Owj Arts and Media Organization.

== Production ==
The film was shot at the Qasr prison.

In an interview, the director Dehnamaki stated that he intended to portray the impact of spirituality on prisoners in this film.
