= Zendeh Rood (talk show) =

- Directed by: Molod Mohammadi, Habib Narimani
- Country of origin: Iran
- Original language: Persian

Production
- Producers: Mohammad Ali Taleghani, Reza Salehi
- Running time: 150 to 240 minutes
- Production company: IRIB TV5

Original release
- Release: 2000

Zendeh Rood (Persian: زنده رود) is an Iranian TV talk show with a cultural and social focus, which will be broadcast live on IRIB TV5 on Fridays. It is also broadcast on IRIB Shoma at the same time.

== Program sections ==
"Zendeh Rood" consists of different parts. According to the selected topic, the initial part of the program will be attended by experts from the seminary and the university. The next section will introduce the elite scientific, cultural, sports and top artists in the field of handicrafts and arts in Isfahan province.

In the next section, the prominent artists of Iran will be introduced. During the program, various reports from various places of interest, customs and cultures are prepared and broadcast. Music, anthems and interviews with singers are other parts of the program. There are also sports and competition sections for artists in the show.

== Zendeh Rood 98 ==
Zendeh Rood 98 is one of the series of this TV program that was broadcast in 2019 on the national IRIB TV5 and IRIB Shoma of Iran in two 14-episode seasons.

=== Cast and Crew in First seasons 2019 ===
- Director: Habib Narimani
- Producer: Reza Salehi
- Director of photography: Majid Mohseni
- Ali Rafie as "Host"
- Javad Madani as "Host"
- Danial Hajibarat as "Karting coach"
- Shahrzam Shahzamani as "Karting coach"
- Nima Karami as "Host"
- Ali Eshtiaghi as "Host"
- Arzhang Amirfazli as "Guest"
- Narges Mohammadi as "Guest"
- Sepand Amirsoleimani as "Guest"
- Negar Abedi as "Guest"
- Nader Soleimani as "Guest"
- Hossein Mehri as "Guest"
- Pendar Akbari as "Guest"
- Vahid Rahbani as "Guest"
- Mohammad Reza Hashemi as "Guest"
- Shahrzad Kamalzadeh as "Guest"
- Yousef Sayyadi as "Guest"
- Habib Narimani as "Self"
- Abbas Jamshidifar as "Guest"
- Hadise Tehrani as "Guest"
