= Javad Hashemi =

Iranian film director and actor

- جواد هاشمی
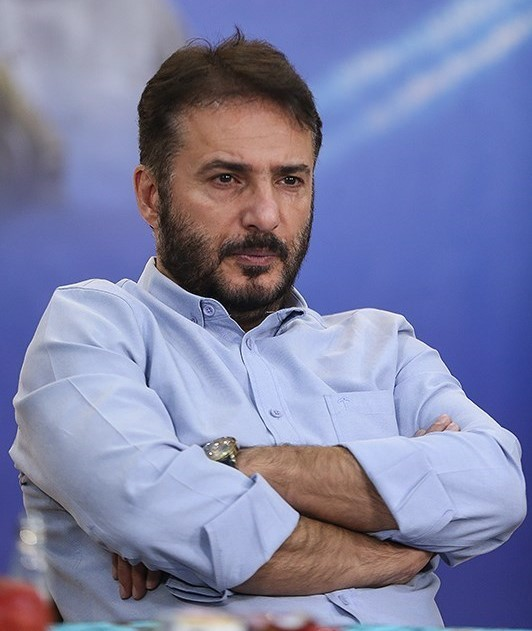
- Born: Seyed Siamak Hashemipour Asl; 17 January 1966 (age 60); Rezvanshahr, Gilan, Iran
- Occupations: Actor, director, composer
- Years active: 1980–present
- Spouse: Farzaneh (Robabeh) Pourhosseini Anari (m. 1991)
- Children: 2

Seyed Javad Hashemipour Asl (Persian: سید جواد هاشمی‌پور اصل, born 17 January 1966), better known as Seyed Javad Hashemi (سید جواد هاشمی), is an Iranian actor, film director, writer, and composer.

== Early life ==
He was born on 17 January 1966 in Tehranpars, Tehran. He was graduated from Tehran University college of arts in 1994. He was married in 1991. He has one son, Mohsen (born 12 January 1995) and one daughter, Fatemeh Sadat (born 19 April 2000).

== Acting career ==
Hashemi began professional acting on theater in 1980. His first feature theatre role was Haj Ebrahim-Haj Ashoora(1980, Kamaloddin Ghorab) in Tehran City Theatre. After Haj Theatre, he continued roles in theatre and working for Ministry of Education. He began acting in cinema with Parvaz Dar Shab (1987, Rasoul Mollagholipour). He attended in his more than 43 movies so far and long and short series. He mostly roled as a Basiji in movies that he acted.

== Political career ==
He supported Mir-Hossein Mousavi in 2009 presidential election. During 2009-10 election protests, he directed and acted in a political theatre named Farzande Edalat with presence of a number of politicians such as Mohammad Khatami, former President. He read a poem for Khatami and said that "I learned that the desires of the child against the dictatorship, I tell in theatre".

== Filmography ==
=== Film ===
- The Flight in the Night (1987)
- Simorgh (1988)
- Ensan Va Aslahe (1989)
- Ofogh (1989)
- Almas Banafsh (1990)
- Sokoot (1990)
- The Glass Eye (1990)
- Taghib Sayeha (1991)
- Hemaseye Majnoon (1992)
- Khaste Nabashid (1992)
- Sajadeye Atash (1993)
- Akharin Shenasayi (1993)
- Lak Posht (1996)
- Soraat (1996)
- Yas haye Vahshi (1997)
- Jane Sakht (1997)
- Teror (1997)
- Parvaze Rooh (1998)
- Take A Look At The Sky Sometimes (2003)
- Rahe Tey Shode (2004)
- Ekhrajiha 1 (2007)
- Pesar Tehrooni (2008)
- Ekhrajiha 2 (2008–2009)
- Footballers (2009)
- Ekhrajiha 3 (2011)
- Ta door Dast (2011)
- Avaz por Jebrail (2011)
- Octopus1: White Forehead 1 (2012)
- Meraji ha (2014)
- Stupid Philosophers (2016)
- Hashtag (2017)
- White Forehead 2 (2018)
- White Forehead 3 (2019)
- Tornado (2019)
- Cats City 2 (2020)
- Mansour (2021)
- Fossil (2023)

=== Television ===
- Khaste Nabashid (1989, TV film)
- Rozanei be sepideh (1990, TV series)
- Ghabileye Eshgh (1991, TV series)
- Rouhollah (1992, TV series)
- Simorgh (1993, TV series)
- Teror (1995, TV series)
- My Best Summer (1996, TV series)
- Jang Ahkam (1997, TV theatre)
- Raze yek Khazan (1998, TV series)
- Rahe Derakhshan (1998)
- Yade Ayam (1998)
- Entezar Sorkh (1998, TV series)
- Revayat Enghelab (1998, TV documentary)
- Narges (1998, TV series)
- Children of Heaven (1999, TV series)
- Booye Khak (1999, TV series)
- Monologue haye mokhtalef (1999, TV series)
- Monologue haye enghelab (2000, TV series)
- Monologue haye azadari (2000, TV series)
- Younes (2000, TV series)
- Alert (2000)
- Yaldaye Ghadr (2000)
- Bazihaye Penhan (2000, TV film)
- Kolbeye Sefid (2000)
- Zendegi Raz Hasti (2001)
- Dolat Eshgh (2001, TV film)
- Mazloome Aval (2001)
- Tan Ha (2003)
- Afsoon (2003, TV series)
- Doet (2003, TV film)
- Rain City (2003, TV series)
- Soroude Khak (2004, TV series)
- Help Me (2004, TV series)
- Sayeye Aftab (2004, TV series)
- Gheseye Tarikh (2004, TV series)
- Aroose Koohestan (2005, TV film)
- Jazireye X (2005, TV series)
- Pool Kasif (2005, TV series)
- Path Taken (2005, TV film)
- Jashne Ramazan (2005, TV program)
- Hadis Bidari (2005, TV series)
- Zaersaraye Momtaz (2005, TV series)
- Zendegi Besharte Khandeh (2005, TV film)
- Fox (2006, TV film)
- Cannibal (2006, TV series)
- Az Nafas Oftadeh (2006, TV series)
- 5 Minutes To Border (2007, TV theatre)
- Rahiye Ashegh (2008, TV film)
- Bachehaye Koocheye Davazdahom (2008, TV film)
- Khat Shekan (2008, TV series)
- Yatimane Koofeh (2008, TV series)
- Didar (2008, TV series)
- Power of Love (2009, TV film)
- Mokhtarnameh (2010, TV series)
- Darvazeye saat (2010, TV theatre)
- Rich and Poor (2010, TV series)
- Shekarchiye Ensan (2010, TV film)
- Neshaniye Sevom (2010, TV film)
- Foggy Tabriz (2010, TV series)
- Moj va Sakhreh (2011, TV series)
- Tekiyeye bachehaye mahalye ma (2011, TV series)
- White Situation (2011, TV series)
- Stay Awake (2012, TV series)
- Merajiha (2013, TV series)
- After That Night (2013, TV film)
- Gedan (2013, TV film)
- The Enigma of The Shah (2015–2017, TV series)
- Shiyooe (2015, TV series)
- Mahaleye Golbolbol (2015, TV series)
- Loneliness of Leila (2015, TV series)
- Zendeh Rood 98 (2019, TV program)
- Shahrag (2020, TV series)
- Dadestan (2021, TV series)
- Neshan Eradat (2021, TV program)
- Raz Natamam (2021, TV series)

=== Web ===
Year	Title	Role	Director	Notes
2020	Iranian Dinner	Himself	Saeid Aboutaleb	distributed in Video CD
2020–2021	Mafia Nights	Himself	Saeid Aboutaleb	distributed by Filimo
2021	Shab Ahangi	Himself	Hamed Ahangi	distributed by Filmnet
2021	Mortal Wound	Dastmalchi	Mohammad Hossein Mahdavian	distributed by Filimo

== Composer ==
=== Film ===
- Parvaze Rooh (1997)
- Balhaye Sepid (1998)
- Another One's House (2017)
- White Forehead 3 (2019) (playback singer)

=== Television ===
- Bouye Sibe Kaal (1995, TV film) (end title singer)
