= Sima Tirandaz =

Iranian actress

- سیما تیرانداز
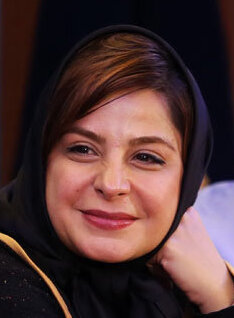
- Tirandaz in 2017
- Born: 31 August 1970 (age 56); Tehran, Iran
- Education: University of Tehran
- Occupation: Actress
- Years active: 1987–present
- Spouses: Nasser Hashemi (divorce); Majid Jozani (divorce)
- Children: Rayan Jozani

Sima Tirandaz (Persian: سیما تیرانداز; born 31 August 1970 in Tehran) is an Iranian actress.

== Biography ==
Sima Tirandaz got her bachelor's degree in dramatic literature from Azad University and a master's degree in directing and acting from the Faculty of Cinema and Theater. She started acting in 1988 with the educational shows of the School of Arts and Literature of the Broadcasting and Broadcasting under the supervision of her former director - Adineh Gulab. She made her debut in films by playing a small role in the movie Hamon directed by Dariush Mehrjoei and then she played in the movie Banoo directed by Dariush Mehrjoei. But the shadows of attack was a good opportunity for her to act in this film, and she was nominated for the best actress award from the 11th edition of Fajr Film Festival. Sima Tirandaz married Nasser Hashemi, a radio actress, and after some time they separated, her second marriage was with Majid Nasiri Jozani, an actor in Cold Roads, which also ended in divorce.

== Filmography ==
- Dodkesh (TV Mini Series)
- Dracula (TV Series)
- Hot Scent 2018
- In the Time of Hangover 2017
- Behind the Wall of Silence 2017
- Ferrari 2017
- Majan 2014
- Vrojakha 2014
- Keep It Between Us (TV Mini Series) 2013
- Roozha-ye Akhar-e Esfand (TV Movie) 2012
- Maternal songs (TV Movie) 2012
- Maternal Lullabies (TV Movie) 2011
- Siomin Rooz (TV Series) 2011
- Goodbye 2010
- Setayesh Part 1 (TV Series) 2009
- Hot Chocolate 2008
- halghe sabz (TV Series) 2007
- The Reward of Silence 2004
- Khane Dar Tariki (TV Series) 2001
- Javani (TV Series) 2000
- Azhans doosti (TV Series) 1993
- Jaddeye eshgh 1992
- Sayeha-ye hojum 1992
- The Lady 1990
- Hamoun

== Awards ==
- 1991 The best actress of the 10th Fajr Theater Festival (Won)
- 1992 The best leading actor of the 11th Fajr Film Festival (Nominee)
- 2001 The best actress of the 20th Fajr Theater Festival (Won)
- 2006 The best supporting actress of the 11th Khana Cinema festival (Won)
- 2009 The best actress of the 28th Fajr Theater Festival (Won)
