= Mazandaran TV =

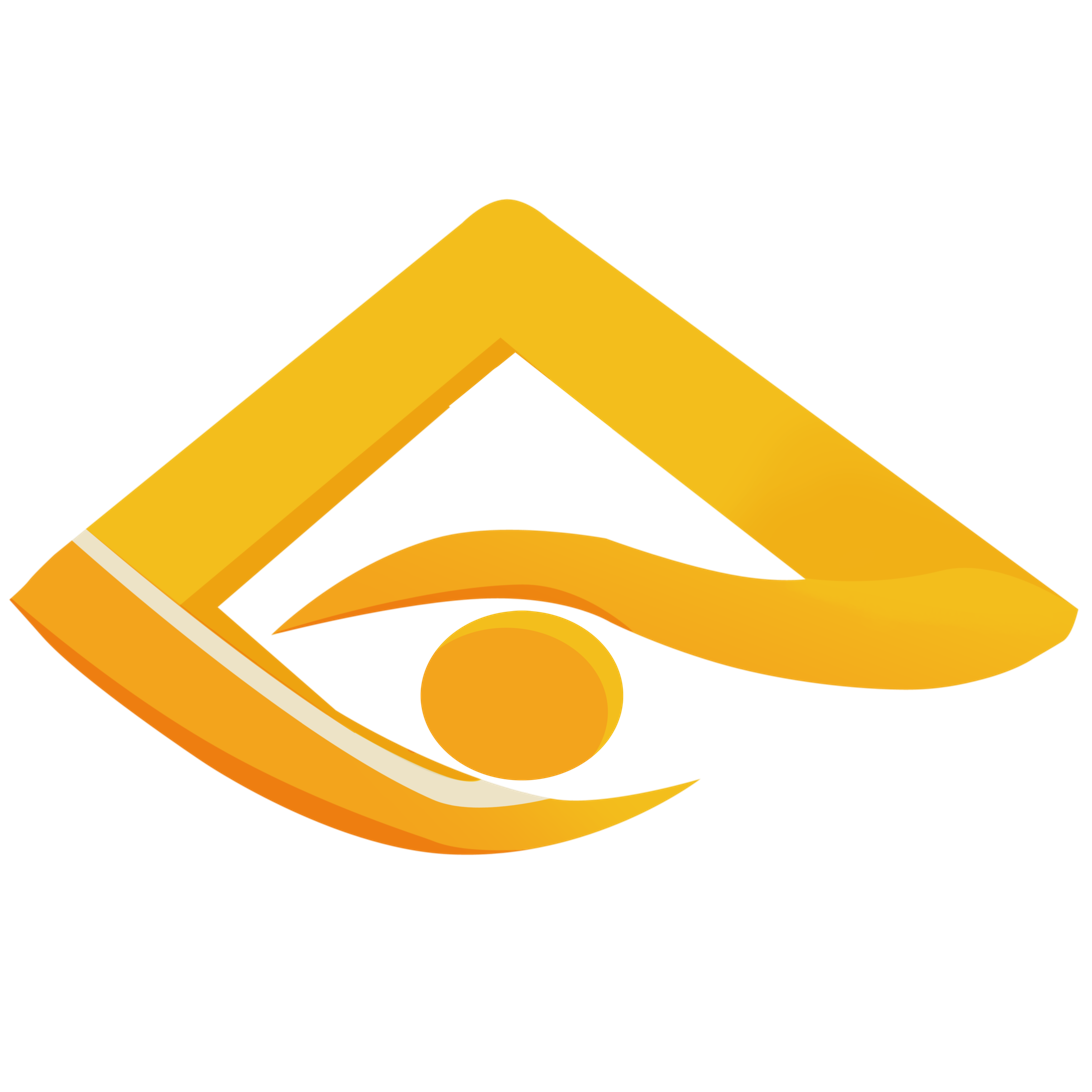
- Mazandaran province; Iran
- City: Sari
- Channels: Digital: 37 UHF (576i SDTV, Namakab Rud) 43 UHF (1080p HDTV, Namakab Rud)

Programming
- Languages: Mazanderani, Turkmen, Persian
- Affiliations: IRIB

Ownership
- Owner: Islamic Republic of Iran Broadcasting

History
- Founded: 1971
- First air date: 1975

Technical information
- Licensing authority: Ministry of Information and Communications Technology of Iran

Links
- Webcast: Sepehr; Telewebion
- Website: Official Website

Mazanderan TV or Tabarestan TV (Mazanderani: تبرستون کانال meaning channel of Tapuria Persian: سیمای طبرستان meaning television of Mazanderan) also Mazandaran Broadcast Network, is a local bilingual IRIB television channel, broadcast in the provinces of Mazanderan and Golestan, some parts of the Semnan and Gilan provinces of Iran, and the Balkan province of Turkmenistan.

== History ==
Early establishment of an independent TV in Mazanderan goes back to the Pahlavi era, in 1971, the first broadcast was installed in the town of Sari, in 1975 television activity developed, and after the revolution of Iran, broadcasts were installed in other cities of Mazandaran (including Gorgan). Soon afterwards, Mazandaran TV Broadcast went on air available via an independent analogue frequency (VHF 36).

== Mazanderani language ==
One of unique sections of this channel is programming in the Mazanderani language, Early movies shown on the channel were all dubs of foreign movies, including many which had not even been dubbed into Persian before. Currently, a selection of cultural programs, music programs, movies, and some serials are broadcast in the language. Additionally, the new manager of this channel who is proud for his Mazanderani heritage asks for publishing news into this language. During the presidency of President Ahmadinejad, most of its programs were published in Mazandarani.

=== Notable programs ===
- Mahtou (Cultural program)
- Rowja (Academical program)
- Bemoni
- Mazerooni Shoo (Cultural program)
- Cheraghe Soo (Cultural program)
- Hira (Cultural program)

== Watching from air ==
Satellite: Intelsat 902 @ 62°E

Channel Name: MazandaranTV

Frequency: 11067 and 10980

S/R: 3610 and 5300

POL: VER and V

FEC: 2/3 and 3/4
