= The Flight in the Night (1987 film) =

1987 Iranian film

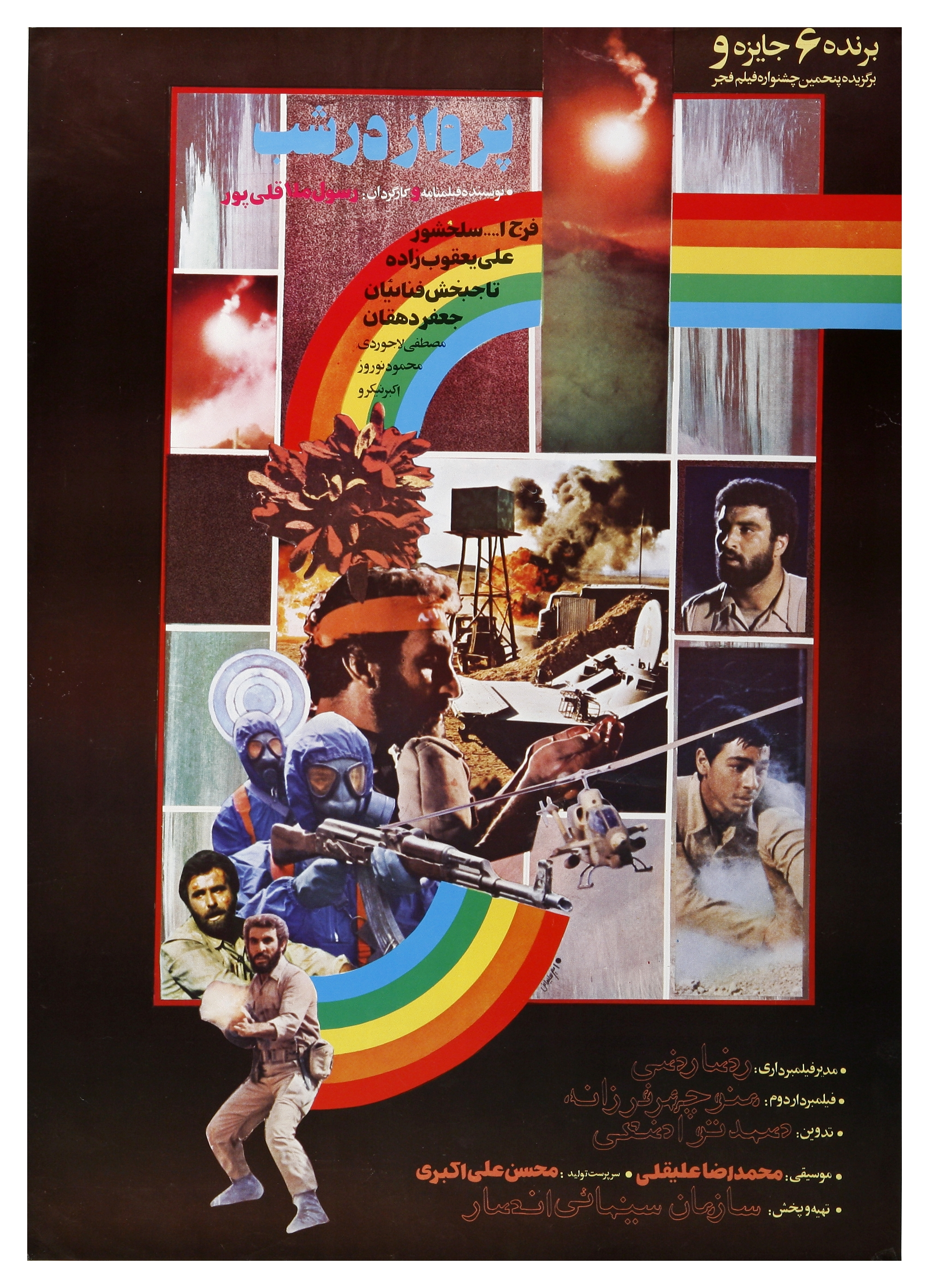
- Directed by: Rasool Mollagholi Poor
- Written by: Rasool Mollagholi Poor
- Produced by: Rasool Mollagholi Poor
- Cinematography: Reza Razi
- Edited by: Samad Tawazeeri
- Music by: Mohammadreza Aligholi
- Release date: 1987
- Running time: 115 minutes
- Country: Iran
- Language: Persian

The Flight in the Night (1987, Persian: پرواز در شب) is an Iranian film by the director Rasool Mollagholi Poor. A war movie set during the Iran–Iraq war, it belongs to the Sacred Defence genre. It has Farajollah Salahshoor in the lead role. The movie won the Crystal Simorgh for Best Picture.

== Plot ==
A battalion of Iranian forces is surrounded and its connection with the central camp is cut off. Four fighters from the battalion are chosen to reach the Headquarters to ask for help. Three of them are killed and one of them reaches the camp. The battalion commander breaks the enemy's siege to provide drinking water for the wounded soldiers, but he is killed. The auxiliary forces arrive and save the rest of the battalion after confronting the enemy.
