= Hamed Ahangi =

Iranian comedian and talk show host (born in 1979)

- حامد آهنگی
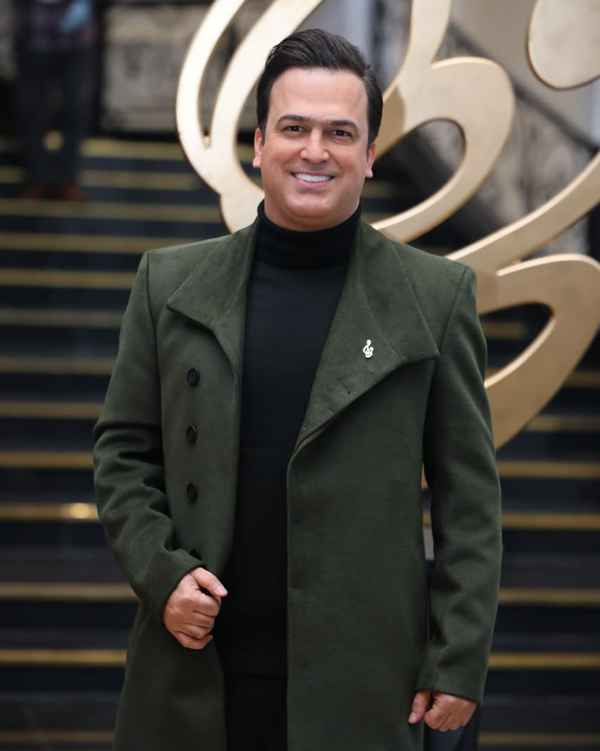
- Ahangi at the 21st Hafez Awards (2021)
- Born: Hamed Ahangi Moghaddam; July 8, 1979 (age 46); Bandar Anzali, Iran
- Education: University of Science and Technology (BS)
- Occupations: Comedian; host; actor; director
- Years active: 1993–present
- Spouse: Safoura Aghasi
- Children: 1

Hamed Ahangi Moghaddam (Persian: حامد آهنگی مقدم; born July 8, 1979) is an Iranian former comedian, host, actor and director. He is best known for his talk show Ahangi Night (2021–present) for which he earned a Hafez Award nomination. In 2023, he received another Hafez Award nomination for TNT.

== Early life and career ==
In 1993, at the age of 14, Hamed Ahangi joined Bandar Anzali theater groups, and a few years later, he won the Academy Award for acting in the province's student theater for his role in a drama play directed by Mohammad Ali Entezari. In 2001, along with Reza Nazari, he started working on the Night War program, and as a writer and director, he performed various plays, including Adventurous Journey, Concours, Satellite, Classroom, Random Groom, and Fake Secretary.

The beginning of his professional music work was formed in 2002 with the invitation of Baran Network; he experienced working with television and made various programs for the network over the years. In 2010, at the invitation of Hamid Khandan, he joined the Kish Nights program and performed the program on Kish Island on a monthly basis. After the introduction of stand-up comedy in the family program in 2016, he started performing a stand-up program in Khandevaneh and became famous.

== Filmography ==
=== Film ===
Year	Title	Role	Director	Notes	Ref(s)
2022	How Much You Want to Cry? 2	Mosayeb	Ali Tavakolnia		
2023	The Crab	Saeed	Mostafa Shayesteh		
TBA	Iran 68		Matin Ojani	Direct-to-video	

=== Web ===
Year	Title	Role	Director	Platform	Ref(s)
2020	Iranian Dinner	Himself	Saeed Aboutaleb	Filimo	
2020–2022	Mafia Nights	Himself	Saeed Aboutaleb	Filimo	
2021–2024	Ahangi Night	Himself	Hamed Ahangi	Filmnet	
2022	Joker	Himself	Ehsan Alikhani, Seyyed Hamed Mirfattahi	Filimo	
2023	TNT	Himself	Hamed Ahangi	Filimo	
2023	Camp Nou	Mojtaba Sarcheshmeh	Manouchehr Hadi	Filimo	
2024–2025	Father's Coffee	Iraj Bazrpash	Mehran Modiri	Filmnet	

=== Television ===
Year	Title	Role	Director	Network	Notes	Ref(s)
2016–2021	Khandevaneh	Himself	Rambod Javan	IRIB Nasim	TV program	
2017	Legionnaire	Tabesh	Masoud Abparvar	IRIB TV5	TV series	
2019	Six and a Half Heroes	Yajuj	Hossein Ghena'at	IRIB TV5	TV series	
2019–2021	Shootball	Himself	Mohammad Peyvandi	IRIB Nasim	TV program	
2020	Neighbourhood Guy	Himself	Ahmad Darvishalipour	IRIB TV2	TV program	
2022	Get Together	Himself	Mehran Modiri	IRIB Nasim	TV program	

== Awards and nominations ==
Award	Year	Category	Nominated Work	Result	Ref.
Hafez Awards	2021	Best Television Figure	Ahangi Night	Nominated	
Hafez Awards	2023	Best Television Figure	TNT	Nominated	
Hafez Awards	2024	Best Television Figure	Ahangi Night	Nominated	

== See also ==
- Iranian stand-up comedy
