= Omid Hajili =

Iranian singer (born 1983)

- امید حاجیلی
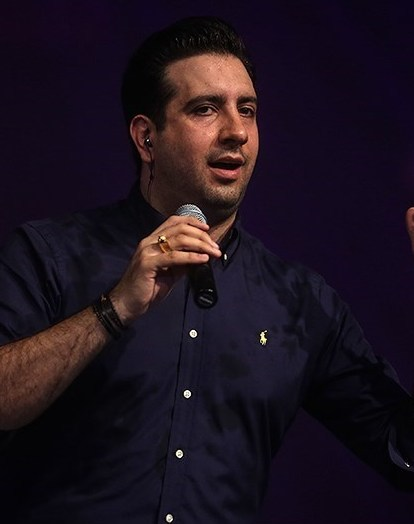
- Omid Hajili at Concert in Kish Island, September 2016
- Born: 24 September 1983 (age 43); Tehran, Tehran province, Iran
- Occupations: Singer; Musician; Composer; Arrangement
- Height: 1.92 m (6 ft 4 in)
- Musical career
- Genres: Persian Pop; Latin; Electropop
- Instruments: Vocals; Piano; Trumpet
- Years active: 2000–present
- Labels: Iran Gaam; Majid Abdi; Donya Music Group (DMG)
- Website: omid-hajili.com

Omid Hajili (Persian: امید حاجیلی, born 24 September 1983) is an Iranian trumpet player, pop singer, musician, composer, and music arranger. He has released three albums, Allegro and Darkoob and Hajilitto.

== Career ==
Omid Hajili was born in 1983 in Tehran. He started playing piano aged nine, and after he became eleven, he entered music school. After about three years of playing violin, he changed his musical instrument to the trumpet, and simultaneously he started to play percussion instruments and drama all by himself. He received his school certification in 1998 and then continued his studies up to a bachelor's degree. He received a master's certification in music from the art university.

Hajili was a professor of the music department of Islamic Republic of Iran Broadcasting, and now he is a professor of the art and architecture department at Islamic Azad university. He is a professional trumpet player and has appeared on many music albums. He has 10 years of background in playing with Tehran Symphony Orchestra, Tehran Philharmonic Orchestra, Seda-o-Sima Symphony Orchestra, and others. He has collaborated with many singers as composer and editor, including Alireza Assar, Sirvan Khosravi, Mohsen Chavoshi (Man tormenting-track), Ali Lohrasbi, Khashayar Etemadi, Hami, Nima Masiha, Shahkar Binesh Pajooh, Mohamad Zare, and Jamshid Azizkhani. He also has been the orchestra leader of some pop music groups, such as Naser Abdollahi, Reza Sadeghi, and one of the main members of Darkoob group.

His first album, Allegro, was a mixture of musical styles with a leaning to South America. It was released in December 2008 by Iran Gam. Hajili is very interested in Latin, funk and rhythmic songs as well as other styles.

== Discography ==
=== Studio albums ===
- 2009: Allegro
- 2010: Daarkoob
- 2016: Hajilitto

== See also ==
- Persian pop music
