= IRIB TV2 =

Iran TV Channel 2

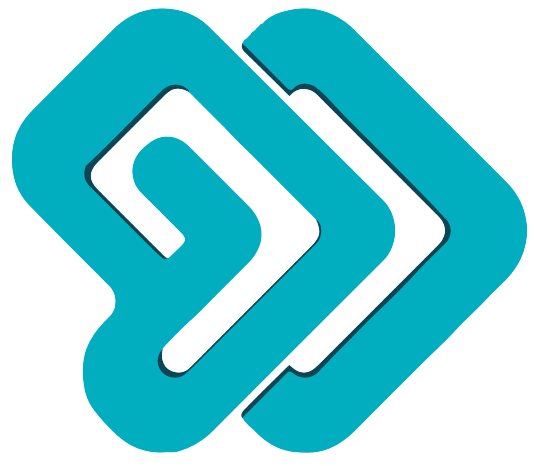
- Country: Iran
- Broadcast area: South Asia, Central Asia, Middle East, Africa
- Headquarters: Tehran

Programming
- Languages: Persian; English (via SAP)
- Picture format: 16:9 (576i, SDTV) 16:9 (1080p, HDTV)

Ownership
- Owner: IRIB

History
- Launched: 19 October 1967; 58 years ago

Links
- Website: www.tv2.ir

Availability

Terrestrial
- Jamaran: CH54 UHF Analog
- Jamaran: CH31 UHF Mobile
- Jamaran: CH37 UHF Digital
- Jamejam: CH9 VHF Analog

Streaming media
- IRIB TV2 livestream

IRIB TV2 (Persian: شبكه دو, romanized: Shabakeh-ye Do, lit. 'Channel Two') is one of the 40 national television channels in Iran. It broadcasts to the Persian-speaking areas of the Middle East and is headquartered in Tehran.

The channel has a variety of programming similar to IRIB TV1, including miniseries, comedies, children's shows, talk shows, news broadcasts, and original television films. It is positioned as the "family and life" network of the corporation.

According to IRIB's new policies since 6 March 2022, all its news programs and others from different channels transferred into IRINN. The 8:00, 14:00, 19:00, and 21:00 news programs from IRIB TV2 have been transferred alongside other news programs like the Special News Negotiation (Ghoftegoyeh Vigeh Khabari) that transferred with Tonight's Headline (Titer Emshab) to IRINN. This changes were not only limited to these news programs as IRIB claimed it will advance to other IRIB channels (however, 20:30 still airs today).

== History ==
=== Before 1979 ===
The Iranian government in 1963 created a cabinet for educational television provision, which was accomplished in 1966. Experimental broadcasts started in October 1966, with official broadcasts starting on October 19 the next year. The educational network was later absorbed into National Iranian Radio and Television, as its second channel.

Color broadcasts started in early 1977 using the French SECAM standard. The service was limited to Tehran but a plan to expand the signals nationwide was already being put to place.

=== After 1979 ===
Ident from 1994

Following the Islamic Revolution of 1979, IRIB took over NIRT's operations and the educational output and expertise from the former second NIRT network was carried over to its replacement. In the 1980s, TV2 carried three to five daily hours of educational content and two daily hours of cultural content.

In 2009, it was repositioned as a channel for children and families.

== Programming ==
=== Original ===
- Mr. Judge (2022)
- Fitile Jome Tatile
- Sandali Dagh
- Varzeshe 2
- Pedar Salar (1993)
- Hamsaran (1994)
- Saate Khosh (1994)
- Dar Panahe To (1994)
- Khane sabz (1996)
- The Forbidden Fruit (2007)
- Dasdasi (2012)
- Good, Bad, Ugly (2015)
- Hidden Government (2015)
- Hanieh (2015)
- Kimia (2016)
- Eight and a half minutes (2016)

=== Acquired ===
- Dae Jang Geum (2008)
- Road to Avonlea (1996)
- Hanekonma (1990)
- Dr. Quinn, Medicine Woman (2001)
- Carnation (2015)
- Good Doctor (2015)
- Fratelli detective (2015)
- SpongeBob SquarePants (2011–2016)
- Blue's Clues (2009–2014)
- Oggy and the Cockroaches (اوگی و سوسک ها, now on IRIB Nahal)
- WordGirl (16 August 2021 – 23 June 2025, 25 September 2025)
- Donkey Hodie (3 October 2022 – 23 June 2025, 25 September 2025 – March 13, 2026)
- Thomas & Friends (16 January 2006 – June 23, 2025, 25 September 2025 – March 13, 2026)
- Hero Elementary (20 October 2022 – 2 January 2025)
- Alma's Way (2022)
- Poppets Town (2023 – 23 June 2025, 25 September 2025 – March 13, 2026)
- Doki (February 2023 – 6 April 2025)
- Curious George (Season 10) (20 May 2022 – 4 January 2024)
- Fetch! with Ruff Ruffman (20 May 2022 – 2025)
- Wow! Wow! Wubbzy! (28 March 2021 – 6 January 2025, 25 September 2025 – March 13, 2026)
- Postcards from Buster (March 2023 – 23 June 2025)
- Wonder Pets! (March 2023 – 23 June 2025, 25 September 2025 – March 13, 2026)
- Bossy Bear (14 May 2023 – 23 June 2025, 25 September 2025 – March 13, 2026)
- Work It Out Wombats! (2023 – 23 June 2025, 25 September 2025 – March 13, 2026)
- Carl the Collector (6 January – 23 June 2025)
- Milo (6 January – 23 June 2025)
- Book Hungry Bears (6 January – 2 April 2025)
- George Pig (6 January – 23 June 2025, 25 September 2025 – March 13, 2026)
- Senora Acero (6 January – 23 February 2025)
- Wonder Pets: In the City (1 April – 23 June 2025, 25 September 2025 – March 13, 2026)
- Bubble Guppies (18 October 2025 – March 13, 2026)

== See also ==
- Jame Jam TV
