= Joker (TV series) =

Iranian reality tv show

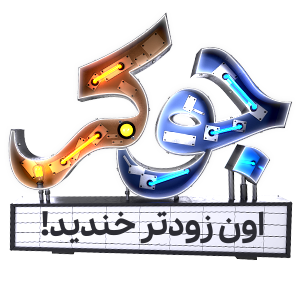
- Genre: Reality show Comedy; LOL
- Written by: Iman Ghiasi; Ali Rezazadeh; Emadodin Karimian; Mehrdad Naeimi; Maryam Aghaei; Fatemeh Khoshkholgh
- Directed by: Ehsan Alikhani; Hamed Mirfatahi
- Presented by: Siamak Ansari
- Voices of: Jaleh Sameti; Naser Tahmasb
- Ending theme: Mohammadreza Alimardani
- Country of origin: Iran
- Original language: Persian
- No. of seasons: 8
- No. of episodes: 25

Production
- Producers: Amir Hossein Bozorgzadegan; Mohsen Najafi
- Production location: Studio Gharne Jadid
- Cinematography: Masoud Rajabian
- Editors: Shana Shahidi; Sara Moalem; Negar Bakhtiari; Kasra Shams
- Running time: 60-90 minutes

Original release
- Release: 27 November 2021 – present

Joker (Persian: جوکر) is an Iranian Reality show made for Filimo. Directed by Ehsan Alikhani and Hamed Mirfatahi, produced by Amir Hossein Bozorgzadegan and Mohsen Najafi. Several famous Iranian celebrities have to make each other laugh, while they themselves should not laugh.

The Joker series is an unlicensed adaptation of the Japanese series Documental.

The second edition of the show called Joker 2: Floor Twenty-One (Persian: جوکر ۲: طبقه بیست و یک) launched in June 2024.

== Plot ==
The Joker Competition has a moderator and presenter or host. In each season, the 8 artists have 6 hours to laugh at each other, without laughing themselves, which would remove them from the game.

The general space of the room where the participants are present and where the competition is held, has a design similar to the home space and has a living room and a kitchen. There is also an accessory and makeup room next to the participants' room. Participants go to this room whenever they want during the game and bring a tool from there or make a change in their appearance so that they can make others laugh with it.

The program has a host who also acts as the referee of the match. He has a separate room with a space similar to a monitoring room, where he sits during the race and monitors the participants. Whenever the host sees one of the participants laughing from their room monitors, he stops the game with the red button in front of him. He then goes to the playroom and fines the offending participant by revealing their laughter in a slow-motion replay. After that, he returns to his room and announces the continuation of the match with the green button.

== Rules and Gameplay ==
The show brings together eight comedians who must compete to remain expressionless while attempting to make their competitors laugh. Any contestant who laughs, smirks, or visibly reacts is given a warning, followed by elimination upon a second offense.

Each participant also has a special opportunity of laughing on a limited time as Joker Time that he can use whenever he wants. In this opportunity, others must pay full attention to him and are not allowed to do anything else, and during this time, the person performs a special performance to make others laugh.

Participants use different methods to make others laugh and perform different types of comedy. These include: comedy performances, characterization and typography, verbal jokes, comic music performances, stand-up comedy performances, the use of various accessories and tools such as dolls and funny costumes, parodying famous works, physical comedy, and so on.

Also, from time to time, a guest enters the contest to be able to make the participants laugh by performing stand-up comedy, telling jokes, playing a game, and so on.

Each participant who receives a red card, and is eliminated from the competition, comes to the host room and watches the continuation of the competition with him. The host can also, at his own discretion, return the deleted participant as Zombie to the room for a certain period of time to make others laugh. With the elimination of the participants, the last person to stay in the room wins the contest and wins the statuette and the grand prize. They will also advance to the finalists section.

== Songs ==
Sina Hejazi has sung a track titled, "Joker", which is played as the ending theme of this series.

No.	Title	Singer	Length
1.	"Parandeh" (Ending theme)	Sina Hejazi
2.	"Joker" (Ending theme)	Mohammadreza Alimardani

== Seasons ==
=== Season 1 ===
- Zombie Performer: Ali Lakpourian
- Guest Appearance: Iraj Maleki

==== Participants ====
- Sam Derakhshani
- Bijan Banafshekhah
- Amir Kazemi
- Gholamreza Nikkhah
- Soheil Mostajabian
- Hooman Haji Abdollahi
- Amin Hayai
- Amir Mahdi Jule

==== Elimination table ====
W The competitor wins the game
S The competitor has not undergone any action and is still safe
A The competitor is warned but continues the game
E The competitor is expelled and exits the game
EE The competitor is warned and expelled in the same episode
- Already expelled in a previous episode

Position	Competitor	Episode				
Position	Competitor	1	2	3	4	Final
1	Soheil Mostajabian	S	S	S	A (Note: Warned for "low engagement" in making the other participants laugh.)	W (Note: Agreed to resign further competition on the final head-to-head "duel" elimination, and share the prize.)
2	Hooman Haji Abdollahi	S	S	A	A	W
3	Gholamreza Nikkhah	S	S	A	E	-
4	Amin Hayai	S	A	A	E	-
5	Sam Derakhshani	A	A	A	E	-
6	Amir Mahdi Jule	A	A	E	-	-
7	Amir Kazemi	S	EE	-	-	-
8	Bijan Banafshekhah	A	E	-	-	-
Host: Siamak Ansari

=== Season 2 ===
- Zombie Performer: Ali Lakpourian
- Guest Appearance: Majid Shapouri

==== Participants ====
- Iman Safa
- Vahid Aghapour
- Hooman Barghnavard
- Shahram Ghaedi
- Abbas Jamshidifar
- Sepand Amirsoleimiani
- Arash Nowzari
- Behnam Tashakkor

==== Elimination table ====
W The competitor wins the game
S The competitor has not undergone any action and is still safe
A The competitor is warned but continues the game
E The competitor is expelled and exits the game
EE The competitor is warned and expelled in the same episode
- Already expelled in a previous episode

Position	Competitor	Episode				
Position	Competitor	1	2	3	4	Final
1	Hooman Barghnavard	S	S	S	A	W (Note: Finished the 6-hour period unable to make each other be expelled, and shared the prize.)
2	Shahram Ghaedi	S	S	S	A	W
3	Iman Safa	S	S	S	EE	-
4	Arash Nowzari	S	A	E	-	-
5	Behnam Tashakkor	S	A	E	-	-
6	Abbas Jamshidifar	A	A	E	-	-
7	Vahid Aghapour	A	A	E	-	-
8	Sepand Amirsoleimiani	A	E	-	-	-
Host: Siamak Ansari

=== Season 3 ===
- Zombie Performer: Ali Lakpourian
- Guest Appearance: Manouchehr Azari

==== Participants ====
- Hamid Lolayi
- Soroush Jamshidi
- Alireza Ostadi
- Mir-Taher Mazloomi
- Siavash Cheraghipour
- Babak Nahrain
- Reza Shafiei Jam
- Amir Ghaffarmanesh

==== Elimination table ====
W The competitor wins the game
S The competitor has not undergone any action and is still safe
A The competitor is warned but continues the game
E The competitor is expelled and exits the game
EE The competitor is warned and expelled in the same episode
- Already expelled in a previous episode

Position	Competitor	Episode				
Position	Competitor	1	2	3	4	Final
1	Alireza Ostadi	S	S	A	A	W
2	Mirtaher Mazloumi	S	S	S	EE	-
3	Reza Shafiei Jam	A	A	A	E	-
4	Soroush Jamshidi	A	A	A	E	-
5	Babak Nahrain	A	A	E	-	-
6	Amir Ghaffarmanesh	A	A	E	-	-
7	Siavash Cheraghipour	S	A	E	-	-
8	Hamid Lolayi	A	E	-	-	-
Host: Siamak Ansari

== Season 4 ==
- Zombie Performer: Ali Lakpourian
- Guest Appearance: Asghar Semsarzadeh

=== Participants ===
- Pouria Poursorkh
- Yousef Sayadi
- Mehran Rajabi
- Shahab Abbasi
- Siavash Mofidi
- Yousef Teymouri
- Seyyed Ali Salehi
- Behzad Mohammadi

=== Elimination table ===
W The competitor wins the game
S The competitor has not undergone any action and is still safe
A The competitor is warned but continues the game
E The competitor is expelled and exits the game
EE The competitor is warned and expelled in the same episode
- Already expelled in a previous episode

Position	Competitor	Episode				
Position	Competitor	1	2	3	4	Final
1	Yousef Sayyadi	S	S	A	A	W
2	Yousef Teymouri	S	A	A	E	-
3	Seyyed Ali Salehi	S	A	A	E	-
4	Shahab Abbasi	S	S	EE	-	-
5	Mehran Rajabi	S	A	E	-	-
6	Behzad Mohammadi	S	A	E	-	-
7	Pouria Poursorkh	S	A	E	-	-
8	Siavash Mofidi	A	E	-	-	-
Host: Siamak Ansari

== Record of watching ==
The second episode of the Joker, with 18,410,491 minutes of viewing in 16 hours, set a record for watching a series in Filimo.

== Overview ==
=== Joker ===
Season	Release date and time	Episodes	First aired	Last aired
1	Saturdays at 8:00 PM	4	27 November 2021	20 December 2021
2	Mondays at 8:00 PM	4	27 December 2021	17 January 2022
3	Mondays at 8:00 PM	4	24 January 2022	14 February 2022
4	Mondays at 8:00 PM	4	21 February 2022	14 March 2022
5	Mondays at 8:00 PM	4	21 March 2022	11 April 2022
6	Mondays at 8:00 PM	5	25 April 2022	23 May 2022
7	Mondays at 8:00 PM	5	6 June 2022	4 July 2022

=== Joker 2: Floor Twenty-One ===
Season	Release date and time	Episodes	First aired	Last aired
1	Wednesdays at 8:00 AM	4	5 June 2024	TBD
