= IRIB Tehran =

Television station in Tehran

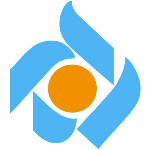
- Tehran Province; Iran
- City: Tehran
- Channels: Digital: 41 (UHF) 16:9 (576i, SDTV) 16:9 (1080p, HDTV); Virtual: 5
- Branding: Tehran Channel; IRIB TV5

Programming
- Language: Persian

Ownership
- Owner: Islamic Republic of Iran Broadcasting

History
- First air date: 26 November 1995

Technical information
- Licensing authority: Ministry of Information and Communications Technology of Iran
- Translator(s): Alvand (UHF 41); Jamaran (UHF 34)

Links
- Webcast: Sepehr; Telewebion
- Website: http://www.tv5.ir

IRIB Tehran (Persian: شبکه تهران, romanized: Shabakeh-ye Tehran, lit. 'Tehran Channel'), is a flagship television station in Tehran, Iran, owned and operated by the Islamic Republic of Iran Broadcasting.

The channel is one of the newer television channels in Iran and was established on 26 November 1995. The channel was also referred to as Tehran Channel by the citizens of Tehran, as it was only available in Tehran. On 20 December 2014, the channel changed from a provincial to a national channel, adding programs focusing on the economy. Tehran's provincial channel started broadcasting on 25 January 2016, in its own right but merged again with IRIB Tehran on 10 August 2016 and the Tehran Channel became provincial again.

== Popular programs ==
- Be Khane Barmigardim
- Dorane Sarkeshi (2003)
- Pavarchin (2002–2003)
- Rangin Kaman
- Shabhaye Tehran
- Oboore Shishei (2006)
- Shabe Shishei (2007)
- My Plus
- Mosalase Shishei (2008)
- Tehran 20
- Baraye Akharin Bar
- Thank You (2008)
- Alarm for Cobra 11 - The Motorway Police
- Behind the White Tower (2009)
- Robin Hood (2007, 2009)
- Jashne Ramezan
- Mosabeghe Bozorg
- Dani va Man
- Roozegare Javani
- Hotel
- Khodroe Tehran 11
- How It's Made
- Yi San (2014)

== See also ==
- Mazandaran TV
