= IRIB TV1 =

Iranian public TV station

- The main IRIB TV1 logo (top), and its alternative symbol used since 2025 (bottom).
- Type: terrestrial television network
- Country: Iran
- Broadcast area: Iran, (bordering regions of Azerbaijan, Iraq, Turkey, Armenia, Afghanistan, Pakistan, Turkmenistan)
- Headquarters: Tehran

Programming
- Language: Persian
- Picture format: 16:9 (576i, SDTV) 16:9 (1080p, HDTV)

Ownership
- Owner: Islamic Republic of Iran Broadcasting
- Key people: Peyman Jebelli (Director-General)

History
- Launched: 21 March 1958; 68 years ago
- Former names: TVI (1958–1969)

Links
- Website: tv1.ir

Availability

Terrestrial
- Jamaran: CH37 UHF Digital

Streaming media
- IRIB TV1 Live Streaming

IRIB TV1 (Persian: شبکه یک, romanized: Shabakeh-ye Yek, lit. 'Channel One') is one of the 40 national television stations in Iran.

IRIB TV1 was the first national television station in Iran, and is now the oldest Iranian television station having been established in 1958. The channel is referred to by some as the National Channel, as most of Islamic Republic of Iran Broadcasting's television budget is set aside for this station.

The station has a wide range of programming such as drama series, television premieres of major Iranian movies, and talk shows. Children's shows also air in reruns, but most of them air first-run on IRIB TV2's youth programming block. The station also has the most watched Iranian news broadcast and televises the Friday prayers. The station televised major sporting events until these were moved to IRIB TV3.

This station has been subjected to human rights abuses by airing forced confessions on live television.

== History ==
=== Before 1979 ===
The station was founded in 1957 as a private entity by the Sabet family, a renowned family of merchants, who operated Television of Iran (TVI), the first commercial TV company in the Middle East. Habib Sabet, who represented RCA in the country, was its owner. The station would include local content and foreign productions from the United States and Europe. Its broadcasts started on 21 March 1958 on channel 2 in Tehran. The building was dedicated by Shah Mohammad Reza Pahlavi on 3 October 1958. Its first manager was RCA engineer A. Vance Hallack, who also managed Television of Baghdad, the first in the Middle East, and television demonstrations in Jakarta and New Delhi. By October, the station moved frequencies, from channel 2 to channel 3, broadcasting four hours a night. TVI operated two stations: TVI-T in Tehran and TVI-A in Abadan.

As of 1964, over 80,000 television sets received its signals, and the possibility of opening up a second channel would increase the amount of foreign content, which was already present on the existing service - the majority of which came from the United States, who also supplied television equipment. TVI was also subject to censorship by the Department of Publications and Radio. In the summer of 1965, the station in Tehran received technical assistance from Richard L. Spears to improve its technical capabilities and ad revenue. His reforms included a new nightly news program and a new slogan ("dedicated to the progress of Iran").

At its launch, TVI had the sponsorship of numerous blue chip Western companies, such as RCA, General Tire, Pepsi-Cola, Autolite, Squibb and Volkswagen, with Sabet having opened the first Pepsi-Cola plant in Iran in 1955. However, by 1963, it claimed to have lost 70 million rials, and its owners attempted to sell the station to the government, but by then it had already approved plans for its own television network.

The Iranian government were concerned over the commercial nature of the service, which prompted action to introduce educational programming. There were talks to become a part of the Department of Publications and Broadcasting, which would eliminate commercial advertising.

TVI was nationalized in late April 1969. Around that time, its coverage area expanded far beyond the two initial cities. NITV on channel 3 conserved much of the output of the former TVI, broadcasting on two periods – a noon period and an evening period that ran from 6pm to around midnight. In 1971, it became a part of NIRT.

=== After 1979 ===
After the Iranian Revolution of 1979, IRIB took over NIRT's operations. American imports disappeared from screens due to the new regime's hostile position towards the United States, as well as being a means of cultural protection, as the regime banned "Western influences" from local culture. Programming became mostly local; the few imports that were carried over were a handful of cartoons, old movies and the British documentary series The World at War. Broadcasts now opened with the national anthem followed by a reading of the Quran. Since only a few Iranians at the time were able to understand Arabic, an announcement provided a Persian translation of the verses. The news was limited to government statements and foreign news. Female continuity announcers now appeared wearing headscarves, which was put in place in June of that year. IRIB officials determined that over time, the content of the television service would be lightened by subsidizing new Iranian productions. During the management of Ali Larijani, this channel changed its analogue colour broadcasting system from SECAM to PAL.

From 14 July 2018 to 20 May 2022, Majid Zainul Abdin managed the channel. On 9 December 2019, on the occasion of the 62nd anniversary of the establishment of the channel and its HD version, the IRIB TV1 updated its visual identity and graphics.

During the Twelve-Day War, the network was knocked off the air when Israeli airstrikes caused a large amount of damage to the IRIB headquarters.

== Logo ==
The logo of the channel is partly taken from the IRIB logo, which is the shape between the "لا" signs (referring to the slogan "neither West, neither East, the Islamic Republic"). This shape alone consists of two square shapes, in the outer part and circle in the inner part. The square shape gives a sense of dynamism to the brand and the circular shape gives the notion of vision. The channel uses turquoise blue as its signature color, which is evocative of Iranian architecture and representative of its civilization.

== Aired programming ==
- The English Briefcase (2000)
- Zero Degree Turn
- Zire Tigh (2006)
- Top Secret
- Daei Jan Napoleon (1976)
- Hezar Dastan (1987)
- Imam Ali (1996)
- Sarbedaran (1984)
- Simorgh (1996)
- Shelike Nahayi
- Fekre Palid
- Dar Chashm-e Baad (2009)
- Prophet Joseph (2008–2009)
- Mokhtarnameh (2010–2011)
- The Delight of the Flight (2011–2012)
- Paytakht (2011-)
- Laughing in the Wind
- The Old Fox
- Secret Army
- Against the Wind
- All Saints (2006–2012)
- Foyle's War
- Stingers
- Police Rescue
- Columbo
- Damenari
- Doraemon
- Sima News

== See also ==
- Jame Jam TV
