= Saeid Aboutaleb =

Iranian filmmaker and politician

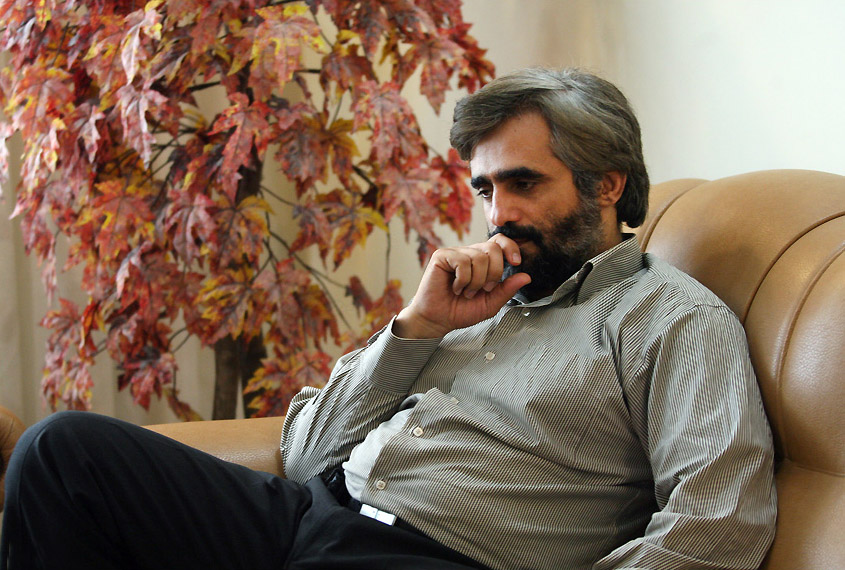

Member of the Parliament of Iran
- In office 28 May 2004 – 28 May 2008
- Constituency: Tehran, Rey, Shemiranat and Eslamshahr
- Majority: 582,679 (29.55%)

Personal details
- Born: c. 1969 (age 56–57) Tehran, Iran
- Other political affiliations: Alliance of Builders of Islamic Iran (2004); Principlists Pervasive Coalition (2008)
- Occupation: Filmmaker

Saeid Aboutaleb (Persian: سعید ابوطالب) is an Iranian documentary filmmaker and conservative politician who served a member of the Parliament of Iran from 2004 to 2008 representing Tehran, Rey, Shemiranat and Eslamshahr.

== U.S. detainment in Iraq ==
While on mission with the Islamic Republic of Iran Broadcasting during 2003 invasion of Iraq, Aboutaleb along with the reporter Soheil Karimi, and their interpreter and driver were detained by American forces and held captive from 1 July to 4 November 2003.

== Views ==
Aboutaleb was a critic of Mahmoud Ahmadinejad.
