= Final examination (disambiguation) =

A final examination is a test given to students at the end of a course of study or training.

Final examination or Final exam may also refer to:

- Final Exam (album), seventh album by Loudon Wainwright III
- Final Exam (1981 film), slasher film
- Final Exam (2017 film), an Iranian drama film
- "Final Exam" (Teen Titans), an episode of Teen Titans
- "Final Exam" (The Outer Limits), a 1998 episode of The Outer Limits
- Final Exam (video game), a 2013 side-scroller video game
- Final Exam: A Surgeon's Reflections on Mortality, a 2007 book by Pauline Chen
- Final Exam (novel), a novel by Julio Cortázar
- Final Examination (film), 2003 film directed by Fred Olen Ray
