= Arman Darvish =

Iranian actor (born 1987)

- آرمان درویش
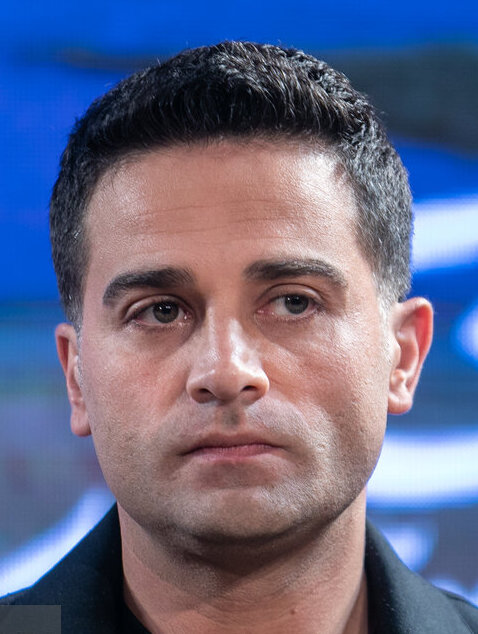
- Darvish at the 2026 Fajr Film Festival
- Born: August 20, 1987 (age 38); Aleshtar, Lorestan, Iran
- Occupation: Actor
- Years active: 2016–present

Arman Darvish (Persian: آرمان درویش; born August 20, 1987) is an Iranian actor. He is known for his acting in Wednesday (2016), Human Comedy (2017) and Queen of Beggars (2021).

== Career ==
Arman Darvish made his cinematic debut in 2016 with the movie Wednesday and has since appeared in various cinematic projects and in 2018 he won the Best Actor award for Human Comedy in 9th Annual Norway Tamil Film Festival.

Prior to his acting career, he worked with Iranian writer and director Mohammad Hadi Karimi for many years, also he writing screenplays, making short films, and writing articles and film reviews for publications.

== Filmography ==
=== Film ===
Year	Title	Role	Director	Notes
2016	Wednesday	Taher	Soroush Mohammadzadeh	
2017	Behind the Wall of Silence	Ali	Masoud Jafari Jozani	
2018	Human Comedy		Mohammad Hadi Karimi	
2019	Yalda, a Night for Forgiveness	Omid	Masoud Bakhshi	
2020	Filicide		Mohammad Hadi Karimi	
2022	Layers of Lies	Farhad	Ramin Sohrab	
2022	Midnight Sun		Shobeir Shirazi	
2023	The Residents of Nowhere		Shahab Hosseini	
2024	Soodabeh	Mehrdad	Mohammad Ali Sadjadi	
TBA	Lobby		Mohammad Parvizi	
TBA	Men's Game		Amin Tabar	
TBA	Agreement in Principlel		Amir Pourkian	

=== Web ===
Year	Title	Role	Director	Platform	Notes
2021	Queen of Beggars	Alborz Shams	Hossein Soheilizadeh	Filimo	Leading role
2023	Scorpion in Love	Behdad Azadi	Hossein Soheilizadeh	Namava	Leading role
