= Elsa Firouz Azar =

Iranian actress and director

- السا فیروزآذر
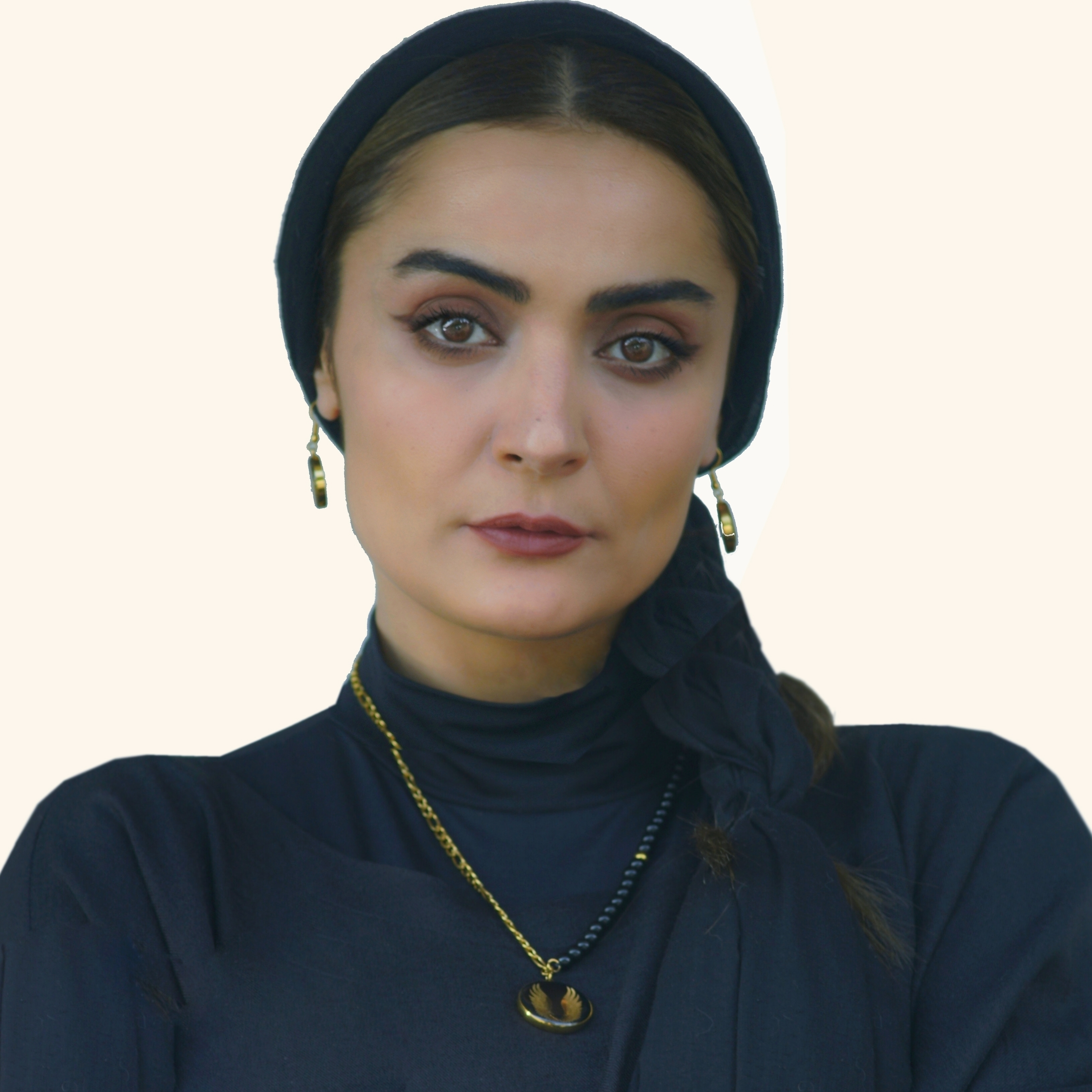
- FirouzAzar in 2024
- Born: 16 September 1983 (age 42); Tehran, Iran
- Occupation: Actress Assistant director Script supervisor Theatre director
- Years active: 1990–present
- Notable work: Cease Fire Checkout Superstar Mali & rah-hay Narafteash

Elsa Firouz Azar (Persian: السا فیروزآذر; born 16 September 1983) is an Iranian actress, assistant director, scene clerk, theatre director and writer.

== Education ==
She holds her bachelor's degree in architecture from Royan Noor University and her master's degree in drama literature from Sura University.

== Career ==
She began acting in cinema at the age of five, and at the age of eight she played her first major role in Kakadu. At age 18, she continued her career in acting more seriously. Then in the cinema and behind the scene, experienced being the scene supervisor and assistant director in several films. She began teaching at the age of twenty-three in the field of arts and art schools, and after completing her master's degree in drama literature, screenwriting and acting workshops were also added to her teaching disciplines. After making some short experimental films, Firouz A'zar made the short film "Too loud a silence" for the first time at age 35 in 2018. Also in the same year, she directed a psychological-philosophical theater with 30 actors "Labyrinth and more". After writing several screenplays, for the first time, her screenplay "I hate Tehran" is being directed by Yasaman Nosrati.

== Filmography ==
=== Film ===
Year	Title	side	Director
1991	Afsane-ye Ah	Actress	Tahmineh Milani
1992	What else News	Actress	Tahmineh Milani
1996	Kakadu		Tahmineh Milani
2005	The Unwanted Woman	Actress	Tahmineh Milani
2006	Crossroads	Actress	Abolhassan Davoodi
2006	Cease Fire	Actress, assistant director	Tahmineh Milani
2006		Scene clerk	Tahmineh Milani
2007	Nescafe Hot Hot	Actress	Ali Ghavitan
2007	Tasvie hesab	Actress	Tahmineh Milani
2008	Majnoone Leyli	Actress	Ghasem Jafari
2008	Saate Sookhte	Actress	Mojtaba Asadipour
2008	Ekhraji	Assistant director	Mehdi Karampour
2009	Superstar	Actress, assistant director	Tahmineh Milani
2009	Gerogan	Assistant director	Mohammad Reza Ahanj
2011	Yeki az ma do nafar	Actress	Tahmineh Milani
2011	How I Became a Billionaire	Actress	Ali Abdolalizadeh
2014	Cease Fire 2	Advisor to the director	Tahmineh Milani
2017	Untaken Paths	Actress	Tahmineh Milani
2019	I Hate Tehran	Writer	Yasaman Nosrati
2019	Change Time	Actress	Maryam Rahimi
2021	Hezar-o-Yek too	Director and Actress	Elsa Firouz Azar

=== Home series ===
Year	Title	side	Director
2019	The Monster	Actress	Mehran Modiri
2021	Island	Actress	Siroos Moghadam

=== Short Film ===
Year	Title	side	Director
2021	Everything for sale	Actress, Assistant Director	Hamidreza Sangian

== Theatre ==
Year	Title	side	Director
2017	Ma'nus	Actress	Nazanin Sousamizadeh
2017	Tanhay Por Hayahoo	Actress	Amir Kaveh Ahanin Jan
2020	true Confidential	Actress	Seyed Mohsen Mirhashemi
2021	Hezar-o-Yek too	Director and writer	Elsa Firouz Azar

== Awards ==
- In 2019, she won the award for Best Actor for Film Change Time of Direction by Maryam Rahimi of the Italian Aprilia Film Festival
- 2021 winner of the award for the best artistic director of the Teletheater Hezar-o-Yek too from the Fajr International Therater Festival
- 2021 winner of the award for the best Film editing of the Teletheater Hezar-o-Yek too from the Fajr International Therater Festival
