= Shahab Hosseini =

Iranian actor and filmmaker (born 1974)

- شهاب حسینی
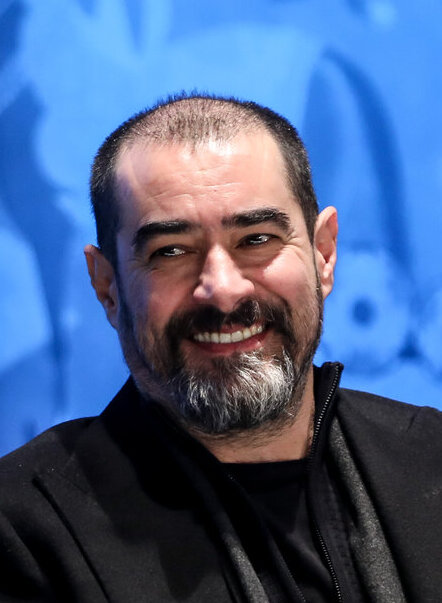
- Hosseini in 2024
- Born: Seyyed Shahabedin Hosseini Tonekaboni; 3 February 1974 (age 52); Tehran, Iran
- Occupations: Actor; producer; director; screenwriter; host
- Years active: 1997–present
- Spouses: Parichehr Ghanbari (m. 1997; div. 2021) Sanaz Arjmand (m. 2022)
- Children: 2

Sayyid Shahabeddin Hosseini Tonekaboni (Persian: سیّد شهاب‌الدین حسینی تنکابنی; born 3 February 1974), known professionally as Shahab Hosseini, is an Iranian actor and producer. he was nominated for the Crystal Simorgh for Best Supporting Actor at the Fajr Film Festival for his performances in A Candle in the Wind (2003) and Redemption at 8:20 (2004). In 2008, Hosseini won the Crystal Simorgh for Best Actor at the Fajr Film Festival for his role in Superstar.

Hosseini, along with the ensemble cast of A Separation, received the Silver Bear for Best Actor at the 61st Berlin International Film Festival in 2011. At the 2016 Cannes Film Festival, he won the Best Actor Award for his performance in The Salesman, becoming the first Iranian actor and the only Iranian male actor to receive this accolade. In 2019, the French government awarded him the Legion of Honour.

== Personal life ==
Seyyed Shahabedin Hosseini Tonekaboni was born on 3 February 1974, in Tehran, Iran. He is the eldest child in his family, with one brother and two sisters. His family originates from Tonekabon, Mazandaran Province. During his childhood, Hosseini lived for several years in Khorramabad with his family. He studied psychology at the University of Tehran but left the program to pursue emigration to Canada. Hosseini began his artistic career with student theater and later worked as a radio presenter.

In 1995, Hosseini married Parichehr Ghanbari. Their first son, Seyyed Mohammadamin, was born in the winter of 2003, and their second son, Seyyed Amirali, was born in the summer of 2011. In 2019, Hosseini married Sanaz Arjmand, a photographer and cinematographer.

== Early life ==
Shahab Hosseini earned his high school diploma in Biology. He dropped out of the University of Tehran as a psychology student and emigrated to Canada. Later, he became a radio host in Iran and hosted a TV show for youth. He also took on some small acting roles in a few TV series. Hosseini's cinematic debut was in Rokhsareh (2002) directed by Amir Ghavidel. His career took off with his performance in the movie The Fifth Reaction directed by Tahmineh Milani. In June 2011, he announced that he would be taking a break but would return to cinema in 2013.

== Career ==
=== Presenting ===
Shahab Hosseini's career began with radio presenting, and in 1998, he transitioned to television hosting in Iran. He appeared as a presenter on the program Oxygen. Hosseini also hosted several other programs, including Barpa Barpa, Morning Color, and Light and Shadow. On radio, he contributed as a presenter for programs such as Two Halves of an Apple, Our Voice, and Joyful Melody. In 2015, he served as a narrator for a pre-dawn television program.

In 2020, Hosseini hosted the talk show Hamrafigh on the Iranian streaming platform Namava, with the first episode airing on December 10, 2020.

=== Television ===
Hosseini debuted as an actor in 2000 with the television series After the Rain. In 2001, he starred in Young Police, followed by Cold Fever in 2003. In 2006, he played Habib Parsa in Zero Degree Turn, directed by Hassan Fathi, a co-production between Iran, Hungary, France, and Lebanon. This role marked a high point in his television career.

In 2009, Hosseini portrayed Abbas Babaei in the series Flight Passion, which was well received by audiences. His first project in Iranian home media, Shahrzad (2014), was his second collaboration with Hassan Fathi, where he played the character Qobad. Despite his extensive film career, Hosseini continued working in television. Following the death of Morteza Ahmadi, he took on the role of narrator for several seasons of the animated series Shekarestan.

=== Film ===
Hosseini entered the film industry in 2001 with Rokhsareh, directed by Amir Ghavidel. Between 2002 and 2004, he appeared in films such as The Fifth Reaction by Tahmineh Milani, This Woman Doesn't Talk by Ahmad Amini, Honey Poison by Ebrahim Sheibani, and Redemption at 8:20 by Sirous Alvand. His performances in A Candle in the Wind (2003) as Babak and Redemption at 8:20 (2004) as Fouad earned him consecutive nominations for the Crystal Simorgh for Best Supporting Actor at the Fajr Film Festival. In 2004, he starred in Online Murder, followed by 50 Million Offer in 2005.

Hosseini's performances in 2007 films, including Eternal Children, A Candle in the Wind, Mahya, and Delshkasteh, garnered significant attention. For his role in Mahya, he received an Honorary Diploma for Best Actor at the Fajr Film Festival. The years 2008 and 2009 were pivotal for Hosseini, with notable roles in Delshkasteh by Ali Roeintan, About Elly by Asghar Farhadi, Superstar by Tahmineh Milani, Highway Vicinity by Shahram Assadi, and Wandering in the Mist by Bahram Tavakoli. His portrayal of Kourosh Zand in Superstar brought him widespread acclaim and the Crystal Simorgh for Best Actor at the Fajr Film Festival. For his roles in Wandering in the Mist and About Elly, he won the Best Actor award at the House of Cinema Festival. His performance as Ahmad in About Elly and as Amin in Wandering in the Mist were particularly acclaimed. In 2008, he worked with a non-Iranian director for the first time in Niloufar, directed by Sabine Jermayel.

In 2010, Hosseini collaborated again with Asghar Farhadi in A Separation, playing the role of Hojjat. The film earned him his first international accolade, the Silver Bear for Best Actor at the 2011 Berlin International Film Festival, shared with the male ensemble cast. He also received the Golden Statuette for Best Supporting Actor at the House of Cinema Festival and an Honorary Diploma at the Fajr Film Festival. His performance was nominated for the ICS Award for Best Supporting Actor by the International Cinephile Society. Critics regard his role in A Separation as one of his most memorable.

In a 2013 poll by the television program Haft, Hosseini was voted the best Iranian actor of the 2000s.

His notable films in 2011 and 2012 include Someone Wants to Talk to You, Hush! Girls Don't Scream, The Painting Pool, and Dream Interpretation. His method acting performance as Reza in The Painting Pool earned him the Special Jury Award for Best Actor at the Lisbon Film Festival. In 2014, Hosseini starred in An Era of Love, receiving another nomination for the Crystal Simorgh for Best Actor at the Fajr Film Festival. That same year, he made his directorial debut with Resident of the Middle Floor, in which he played 38 distinct roles.

In 2015, Hosseini joined Farhadi's seventh feature film, The Salesman, playing Emad. This marked their third collaboration. In 2016, Hosseini won the Best Actor Award at the Cannes Film Festival for his performance, becoming the first Iranian actor to receive this honor. The achievement was widely celebrated in Iran. In the same year, he won the Best Actor Award at the Action on Film Festival in the United States for his role in Hush! Girls Don't Scream.

=== Directing ===
Hosseini began directing in 2014 with Resident of the Middle Floor, a film about a man whose life changes after moving into a new building. In 2015, he co-directed the short film Come with Me with Alireza Nesaei and Sina Azin. His later directorial works include Nowhere Residents and The Dead Writer.

=== Producing ===
Hosseini has produced several films, including:

- Midnight Sun, directed by Shabir Shirazi
- Shin, directed by Meysam Kazazi
- Nargesi, directed by Payam Eskandari
- Nowhere Residents, directed by Shahab Hosseini

=== Other activities ===
Hosseini produced Midnight Sun (2016), directed by Shabir Shirazi. In 2020, he served as a jury member at the Gaziantep Immigrant Film Festival in Turkey. In 2022, he was a juror at the 40th Fajr Film Festival.

== Views and controversies ==
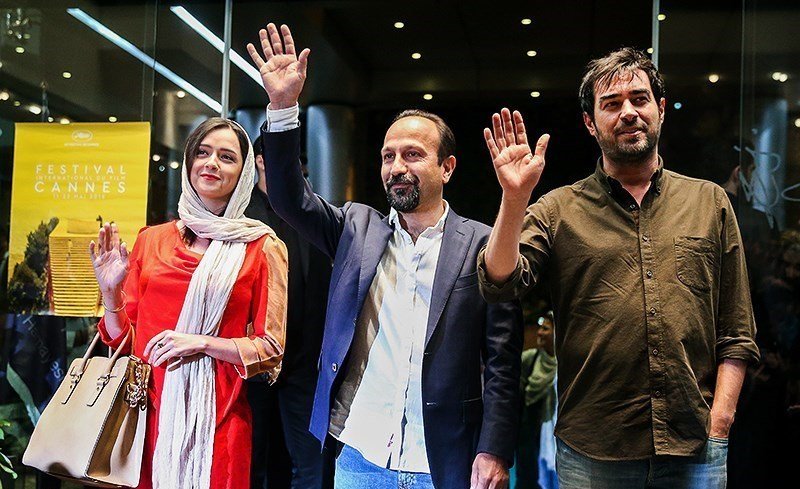
Shahab Hosseini with Asghar Farhadi and Taraneh Alidoosti

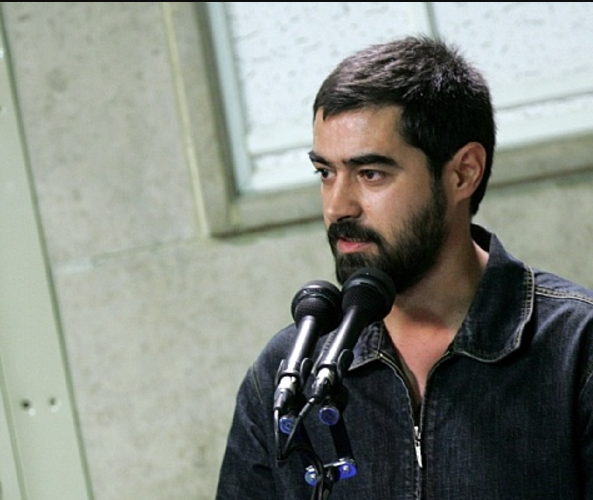
Shahab Hosseini speaking at a meeting with Iranian artists and the Supreme Leader of Iran, 2010

=== 2009 presidential election ===
During the 2009 Iranian presidential election, Hosseini publicly supported Mir-Hossein Mousavi by releasing an audio statement and signing a petition backed by 800 artists endorsing Mousavi's candidacy.

=== 38 roles ===
Hosseini's directorial debut, Resident of the Middle Floor, saw him portray 38 distinct characters, a feat considered a global milestone. Similar achievements include Peter Sellers in Stanley Kubrick's Dr. Strangelove and Dieter Hallervorden in Didi and the Family Inheritance, where actors played multiple roles.

=== Award dedication ===
After winning the Best Actor Award at the 2016 Cannes Film Festival, Hosseini stated: "This award comes from my people, and I return it to them with all my heart and love." At a press conference in Iran, he noted that he received the award on Mid-Sha'ban, the birthday of the Twelfth Imam in Shia Islam, and dedicated part of his success to "the savior of humanity." This gesture received attention from the French newspaper Le Figaro and sparked discussions on social media, with some users noting that Hosseini had initially dedicated the award to the Iranian people.

=== Yalasarat controversy ===
In 2016, following the Hafez Awards, the newspaper Yalasarat al-Hussein published an article titled "All the Assets of a Celebration" and "Who is a Cuckold?" containing inflammatory remarks against Iranian artists. Hosseini responded on his Instagram, writing: "To the dishonorable and obscure individuals who shamelessly published this disgraceful article, the answer is simple. Your hands are unworthy of holding a pen. Put it down and join your Daesh-like kin. Wash your mouths before speaking of the art and artists of this land, as you have no right to judge the beloved of this nation."

=== 38th Fajr Film Festival ===
Following the downing of Ukraine International Airlines Flight 752 by the Islamic Revolutionary Guard Corps, Masoud Kimiai was among the first artists to protest by withdrawing from the 38th Fajr Film Festival. Many Iranian artists across various fields followed suit, boycotting the festival in solidarity with the victims' families and to protest the socio-political situation.

In contrast, Hosseini opposed the boycott, stating on Instagram: "These withdrawals fuel division between 'us' and 'them.' When society and people need unity and compassion, it is wrong to assume that those who participate are not empathetic to the people's pain." On February 9, 2020, at the Fajr Film Festival, Hosseini criticized those who boycotted, including Kimiai, during a press conference for his film Shin at Mellat Cinema Complex. He indirectly referenced Kimiai, saying: "I cannot stay silent when a veteran filmmaker, whose work is known to audiences, refuses to make a film this year, claiming mistreatment, and lays the groundwork for nothing but hatred, putting others in a moral dilemma. It is unfair to be so self-centered and speak without regard for others."

Several artists, including Manijeh Hekmat, Hamed Esmaeilion, Pouya Kimiai, and the Iranian Directors Guild, condemned Hosseini's stance. The Guild's statement read:

The Central Council of the Iranian Directors Guild strongly condemns any disrespect, accusations, or inappropriate remarks against the personal opinion of Masoud Kimiai, a prominent figure of Iran's New Wave cinema. We deeply regret that the official platform of the Fajr Film Festival has become a stage for such disrespect and the degradation of artists.

=== COVID-19 vaccination in the United States ===
In February 2021, footage emerged of Hosseini receiving a COVID-19 vaccine in the United States. Hosseini later confirmed he received the vaccine. At the time, vaccines in the US were primarily allocated to healthcare workers and high-risk individuals. Due to the perishable nature of Pfizer and Moderna vaccines, surplus doses were distributed to individuals present at vaccination centers to avoid waste.

Some social media users criticized Hosseini, citing his past support for Ali Khamenei and the Islamic Republic, which contrasted with Khamenei's opposition to US-made vaccines in Iran. Facing backlash, Hosseini announced his departure from Instagram.

Hosseini later explained: "At a friend's insistence, while accompanying them for a film project, we joined a line for surplus vaccines to try our luck. In the US, vaccination centers for the elderly and priority groups allocate about 20% extra doses to account for breakages or unforeseen issues. After priority vaccinations, surplus doses, which cannot be returned to cold storage, are distributed to the public. That’s all that happened—an opportunity anyone could encounter."

== Filmography ==
=== Film ===
Year	Title	Role	Director	Notes	Ref(s)
2002	Rokhsareh	Mahan Farzam	Amir Ghavidel		
2002	Dummies	Morad	Ali Ghavitan		
2003	The Fifth Reaction	Majid	Tahmineh Milani		
2003	The Woman Keeps Silent	Mani	Ahmad Amini		
2003	Poisonous Honey	Shahin	Ebrahim Sheibani		
2004	A Candle in the Wind	Babak	Pouran Derakhshandeh		
2004	The Ziggurat Goddess	Bahram	Rahman Rezaei		
2005	Fifty Million Proposal	Barmak	Mehdi Sabaghzadeh		
2005	Salvation at 8:20	Foad	Sirus Alvand		
2005	Whirlpool	Homayoun	Hassan Hedayat		
2006	Online Murder	Keyvan	Masoud Abparvar		
2006	Love Story		Bijan Birang		
2006	Eternal Children	Iman	Pouran Derakhshandeh		
2007	Unexpected	Salk	Mohammad Hadi Karimi		
2007	Paradise Station	Soroush	Nader Moghadas		
2007	Flags of Kaveh's Castle	Sadegh	Mohammad Nourizad		
2008	Niloofar	Aziz	Sabine El Gemayel		
2008	Mahya	Javid	Akbar Khajouei		
2009	About Elly	Ahmad	Asghar Farhadi		
2009	Superstar	Kourosh Zand	Tahmineh Milani		
2009	Heartbroken	Amirali	Ali Rouintan		
2009	Around the Highway	Pasha	Siavash As'adi		
2010	A Walk in the Fog	Amin	Bahram Tavakoli		
2010	Anahita	Behnam	Azizollah Hamidnezhad		
2011	Snow on a Hot Tin Roof	Bahman	Mohammad Hadi Karimi		
2011	Final Whistle	Saman	Niki Karimi		
2011	A Separation	Hojjat	Asghar Farhadi		
2011	Goodbye	Esfandiar	Mohammad Rasoulof		
2012	The Paternal House	Naser	Kianoush Ayari		
2012	Someone Wants to Talk with You	Mostafa	Manouchehr Hadi		
2012	Ziba and I	Jafar	Fereidoun Hassanpour		
2013	Africa	Shahab	Houman Seyyedi	Direct-to-video	
2013	The Painting Pool	Reza	Maziar Miri		
2013	The Interpretation of a Dream	Major	Reza Dadooi	Direct-to-video	
2013	Hush! Girls Don't Scream	The Detective	Pouran Derakhshandeh		
2014	A Five Star	Reza	Mahshid Afsharzadeh		
2014	Resident of the Middle Floor		Shahab Hosseini	Also as director	
2015	Time to Love	Hamid	Alireza Raeesian		
2015	Sweet Taste of Imagination	Grous	Kamal Tabrizi		
2016	Come with Me		Shahab Hosseini, Sina Azin, Alireza Nasaee	Also as director	
2016	Parallel Shadows	Rabiei	Asghar Naimi		
2016	Wednesday	Salim	Soroush Mohammadzadeh		
2016	The Salesman	Emad	Asghar Farhadi		
2016	My Brother Khosrow	Khosrow	Ehsan Bigleri		
2016	Gholam	Gholam	Mitra Tabrizian		
2017	Final Exam	Farhad	Adel Yaraghi		
2017	Lobby		Mohammad Parvizi	unreleased film	
2018	The Midnight Sun		Shabir Shirazi	Also as producer, casting director	
2018	The Residents of Nowhere		Shahab Hosseini	Also as director and producer; released in 2023	
2019	Lovely Trash	Mansour	Mohsen Amiryoussefi		
2019	Nabat	Saeed	Pegah Arzi		
2019	Labyrinth	Amirali	Amir Hossein Torabi		
2020	Any Day Now	Bahman Mehdipour	Hamy Ramezan		
2020	Sheen		Meisam Kazazi	As producer	
2020	The Night	Babak Naderi	Kourosh Ahari		
2020	After the Incident	–	Pouria Heidary Oureh	As producer	
2021	Mahrokh's House	–	Shahram Ebrahimi	As producer	
2021	Nargesi		Payam Eskandari		
2022	The Writer Is Dead	–	Shahab Hosseini	As director, producer	
2022	Golden Blood	Mr. Keshavarz	Ebrahim Sheibani		
2022	The Last Act	–	Shahab Hosseini	As director, producer	
2024	Intoxicated by Love	Shams Tabrizi	Hassan Fathi		
2024	Shukran	Taher	Pietro Malegori		
2025	Raha	Tohid	Hesam Farahmand		
TBA	The Far Mountains		Mitra Tabrizian	Pre-Production	
TBA	Wild Berries	Davood	Soudabeh Moradian	Pre-production	

=== Web ===
Year	Title	Role	Director	Platform	Notes	Ref(s)
2015–2018	Shahrzad	Ghobad Divansalar	Hassan Fathi	Lotus Play	Main role; 59 episodes	
2020–2021	Mutual Friendship	Himself	Shahab Hosseini	Namava	Talk show; host, 31 episodes	
2022–2023	The Lion Skin	Moheb Meshkat	Jamshid Mahmoudi	Filmnet	Main role; 24 episodes	
2023–2024	Fereshteh's Sin	Hamed Tehrani	Hamed Angha	Filimo	Main role; 18 episodes	
2025	Aban	Fariborz Sabet	Reza Dadooi	Sheyda	Main role	

=== Television ===
Year	Title	Role	Director	Network	Notes	Ref(s)
2001	After the Rain	Ali Ahmadi	Saeed Soltani	IRIB TV3	TV series	
2001	Fellow Traveler	Reza	Ghasem Jafari	IRIB TV3	TV series	
2001	The Lawyer		Sirous Moghaddam	IRIB TV5	TV series	
2001	Young Police	Younes Behgar	Sirous Moghaddam	IRIB TV3	TV series	
2004	Cold Fever	Shahab Kianfar	Alireza Afkhami	IRIB TV3	TV series	
2007	The Dance Fly	Dr. Vahid Molaei	Ahmad Moradpour	IRIB TV2	TV series	
2007	Zero Degree Turn	Habib Parsa	Hassan Fathi	IRIB TV1	TV series	
2012–2013	Flying Passion	Abbas Babaei	Yadollah Samadi	IRIB TV1	TV series	
2014	Red Hat 93	Himself	Iraj Tahmasb	IRIB TV2	TV series	
2014	Seven	Himself	Mojtaba Amini	IRIB TV3	TV program	
2019	Sugarland	Narrator	Saeed Zamani, Babak Nazari	IRIB Nasim	TV series	
2023–2024	Homeland	Rahi Bahadori	Kamal Tabrizi	IRIB TV3	TV series	

== Theatre ==
Year	Title	Playwright	Director	Stage	Ref(s)
2017	The Confession	Brad Mirman	Shahab Hosseini	City Theater of Tehran	

== Awards and nominations ==
Name of the award ceremony, year presented, category, nominee of the award, and the result of the nomination
Award	Year	Category	Nominated Work	Result	Ref(s)
Action On Film International Film Festival	2016	Best Director – Motion Picture	Resident of the Middle Floor	Won	
Action On Film International Film Festival	2016	Best Actor	Hush! Girls Don't Scream	Won	
Beijing International Film Festival	2021	Best Supporting Actor	Any Day Now	Won	
Berlin International Film Festival	2011	Best Actor	A Separation	Won	
Cannes Film Festival	2016	Best Actor	The Salesman	Won	
Chlotrudis Awards	2012	Best Supporting Actor	A Separation	Nominated	
Cine Paris Film Festival	2022	Best Feature Film	The Writer Is Dead	Won	
Fajr Film Festival	2004	Best Actor in a Supporting Role	A Candle in the Wind	Nominated	
Fajr Film Festival	2005	Best Actor in a Supporting Role	Salvation at 8:20	Nominated	
Fajr Film Festival	2008	Best Actor in a Leading Role	Mahya	Honorary Diploma	
Fajr Film Festival	2009	Best Actor in a Leading Role	About Elly	Nominated	
Fajr Film Festival	2009	Best Actor in a Leading Role	Superstar	Won	
Fajr Film Festival	2011	Best Actor in a Supporting Role	A Separation	Honorary Diploma	
Fajr Film Festival	2015	Best Actor in a Leading Role	Time to Love	Nominated	
Fajr Film Festival	2025	Best Actor in a Leading Role	Raha	Nominated	
Hafez Awards	2010	Best Actor – Television Series Drama	Zero Degree Turn	Nominated	
Hafez Awards	2011	Best Actor – Motion Picture	Superstar and About Elly	Won	
Hafez Awards	2016	Best Actor – Television Series Drama	Shahrzad	Nominated	
Hafez Awards	2017	Best Actor – Motion Picture	The Salesman	Won	
Hafez Awards	2018	Best Actor – Motion Picture	My Brother Khosrow	Nominated	
Hafez Awards	2018	Best Actor – Television Series Drama	Shahrzad	Nominated	
Hafez Awards	2023	Best Actor – Television Series Drama	The Lion Skin	Nominated	
Hafez Awards	2023	Abbas Kiarostami Prize	Residents of Nowhere	Nominated	
Hafez Awards	2024	Best Actor – Television Series Drama	Homeland	Nominated	
Hafez Awards	2025	Best Actor – Motion Picture	Raha	Won	
International Cinephile Society	2012	Best Supporting Actor	A Separation	Runner-up	
Iran Cinema Celebration	2003	Best Actor in a Supporting Role	The Fifth Reaction	Nominated	
Iran Cinema Celebration	2004	Best Actor in a Supporting Role	A Candle in the Wind	Nominated	
Iran Cinema Celebration	2008	Best Actor in a Leading Role	A Walk in the Fog and About Elly	Won	
Iran Cinema Celebration	2011	Best Actor in a Supporting Role	A Separation	Won	
Iran Cinema Celebration	2014	Best Actor in a Leading Role	The Painting Pool	Nominated	
Iran Cinema Celebration	2017	Best Actor in a Leading Role	The Salesman	Won	
Iran's Film Critics and Writers Association	2010	Best Actor in a Leading Role	Superstar and About Elly	Nominated	
Iran's Film Critics and Writers Association	2011	Best Actor in a Leading Role	A Walk in the Fog	Won	
Iran's Film Critics and Writers Association	2012	Best Actor in a Supporting Role	A Separation	Won	
Iran's Film Critics and Writers Association	2014	Best Actor in a Leading Role	The Painting Pool	Honorary Diploma	
Iran's Film Critics and Writers Association	2016	Best Actor in a Leading Role	My Brother Khosrow	Nominated	
Iran's Film Critics and Writers Association	2025	Best Actor in a Supporting Role	Intoxicated by Love	Nominated	
Iranian Film Festival – San Francisco	2020	Best Actor	Labyrinth	Won	
Jasmine International Film Festival	2013	Best Actor in a Direct-to-video	The Interpretation of a Dream	Nominated	
Jasmine International Film Festival	2016	Best Actor – Television Series	Shahrzad	Nominated	
Jussi Awards	2021	Best Actor	Any Day Now	Won	
Molins Horror Film Festival	2020	Best Actor	The Night	Won	
Urban International Film Festival	2015	Best Actor in a Direct-to-video	The Interpretation of a Dream	Golden Statue	
Urban International Film Festival	2025	Best Actor	Raha	Nominated	

== Honors ==
- Legion of Honour French (2014)
