= Island (Iranian TV series) =

Iranian series

- Persian: جزیره
- Genre: Drama
- Written by: Ali Taleb Abadi
- Directed by: Siroos Moghaddam
- Starring: Amir Maghare; Mohammad Reza Foroutan; Shadi Mokhtari; Hengameh Ghaziani; Hesam Manzour; Kazem Sayahi; Elsa Firouz Azar; Ghazal Shakeri; Samiyeh Lak; Mitra Hajjar; Akbar Zanjanpoor; Zoheir Yari; Amir Kazemi; Shirin Bina
- Theme music composer: Masoud Sekhavat Doost
- Country of origin: Iran
- Original language: Persian
- No. of seasons: 1
- No. of episodes: 14

Production
- Producers: Manouchehr Mohammadi; Amir Hossein Heidari
- Production locations: Kish Island, Tehran
- Cinematography: Mohammad Reza Sokoot
- Editor: Sohrab Khosravi
- Running time: 50 minutes

Original release
- Network: Filimo
- Release: 24 October 2021 – 23 January 2022

Island (Persian: جزیره, romanized: Jazire) is an Iranian television series directed by Siroos Moghaddam.

== Plot ==
Jazireh is not a place, it is an excuse for conflict between people who seek their destiny in it, and it is the basis for the efforts of those who decide to have a greater share in life; They do everything to reach the island.

== Storyline ==
Sahra (Shadi Mokhtari), a daring journalist who has failed and been humiliated in love, makes adventurous decisions in pursuit of equality with Arshad Shahang (Amir Maghare), his lover from a noble and wealthy family, and enters into a complex business relationship that changes his life and that of Shahang's family.

== Cast ==
- Amir Maghare as Arshad Shahang
- Mohammad-Reza Foroutan as Shahed Shahang
- Shadi Mokhtari as Sahra Sarraf
- Hesam Manzour as Saeed
- Kazem Sayahi as Payam
- Elsa Firouz Azar as Mahak Shahang
- Hengameh Ghaziani as Azin
- Ghazal Shakeri as Narges
- Samiyeh Lak as Shakiba Shahang
- Mitra Hajjar as Mahshid
- Zoheir Yari as Ardalan
- Akbar Zanjanpour as Karim Shahang
- Hamidreza Pegah as Razi
- Amir Kazemi as AmirHossein
- Bita Farrahi as Ziba
- Shirin Bina as Mother of Sahra
- Pourandokht Mahiman as Grandmother of Sahra
- Shahrooz Delafkar as Ashkan
- Pavan Afsar as Soha
- Mina Vahid as Golrokh
