= Alireza Kazemipour =

Iranian-Canadian screenwriter (born 1973)

- Born: October 19, 1973 (age 52); Iran
- Occupation: screenwriter
- Years active: 1999–present

Alireza Kazemipour (Persian: علیرضا کاظمی‌پور) (born 19 October 1973, Maragheh, Iran) is an Iranian-Canadian screenwriter and film director. He started his career in 1999 and followed it mainly by writing scripts for television series. His screenplays have been nominated or winner in different national and local festivals.

== Biography ==
After graduating from university with a Bachelor in Physics, he opted to follow his passion for writing by attending a screenwriting course. Thereafter, he started his career as a screenwriter in 1999 by writing for television series. Although he had some scripts for movies and television movies on his resume, his main area of focus in writing remains scriptwriting for television series.

He has experience teaching screenwriting for television and cinema as part of the Faculty of Art at the University of Tehran. He has held several screenplay writing workshops and has also participated in different festivals as jury.

He emigrated to Canada in the 2010s and is currently based in Vancouver, British Columbia.

== Education ==
- Master of Art in Cinema, University of Tehran, Tehran, Iran 2010
- Bachelor of Science in Physics, Industrial University of Amir Kabir, Tehran, Iran 1998
- Certificate in Screenwriting, School of Screenwriting, Tehran, Iran 1999

== Filmography ==
=== Movies ===
- The Loser (Bazandeh) - 2004, directed by Ghasem Jafari
- Like a Butterfly (Parvanegi) - 2010, directed by Ghasem Jafari
- Me and Sharmin - 2016, directed by Bijan Shirmarz
- Into Schrodinger's Box - 2020, directed by Amir Ganjavi and Nasim Taghavi

=== Television series ===
- Traveler from India (Mosaferi Az Hend); directed by Ghasem Jafari (2001)
- Lost (Gomgashteh); directed by Rambod Javan (2001)
- Sea Hearts (Daryaie'ha); directed by Siroos Moghaddam (2002)
- Just for You; directed by Akbar Mansour-Fallah (2003)
- Help Me; directed by Ghasem Jafari (2004)
- Oddly (Gharibane); directed by Ghasem Jafari (2004)
- She Was an Angel (Ou Yek Fereshteh Boud); directed by Alireza Afkhami (2005)
- Fly with Bubbles (Parvaz Dar Hobab); directed by Sirous Moghaddam (2006)
- The Breathless; directed by Ghasem Jafari (2006)
- The Forbidden Fruit (Miveh Mamnoue); directed by Hassan Fathi (2007)
- The Last Invitation (Akharin Davat); directed by Hossein Soheili-zadeh (2008)
- Tears and Smiles (Ashkha v Labkhandha); directed by Hassan Fathi (2009)
- Sweethearts (Delnavazan); directed by Hossein Soheili-zadeh (2009)
- The Stepmother (Zan baba); directed by Saied Aghakhani (2010)
- Colonizers (khoshneshinha); directed by Saeid Aghakhani (2011)
- Fortune (Zamaneh); directed by : Hassan Fathi (2012)
- Sounds of Rain (Avaye baran); directed by Hossein Soheili-zadeh (2013)
- Troubles of Azim (Dardesarhaye Azim 1); directed by Borzou Niknejad (2014)
- Troubles of Azim (Dardesarhaye Azim 2); directed by Borzou Niknejad (2016)
- Wheel of Fortune (Charkh e Falak); (2 Episodes); directed by Azizolah Hamid-Nejad (2016)
- Romance (Asheghaneh); directed by Manouchehr Hadi (2017)
- Blowout (Panchari); directed by Borzou Niknejad (2017)

=== Plot for television series (written by others) ===
- The Heir (Vares); directed by Kazem Balouchi (2003)
- Cold fever (Tabe Sard); directed by Alireza Afkhami (2004)
- The Days of protest (Roozhaye Eteraz); directed by Hossein Soheili-zadeh (2005)
- Eve's Daughters ( Dokhtarane Havva); directed by Hossein Soheili-zadeh (2012)
- A Housewife's Notes (Yaddasht'haye Yek Zane Khaneh'dar); directed by Masoud Keramati (2014)

=== Consultant ===
- In Order (Sar Be Rah); directed by Saeid Soltani (2014)
- Outbreak (Shoyou); directed by Mahmoud Moazami (2015)

=== Television movies ===
- This is my house (Inja Khaneye Man Ast); directed by Ali Pakarian (2000)
- A simple mistake (Yek Eshtebahe Sadeh); directed by Ebrahim Sheibani (2006)
- Mother forever (Hamishe Madar); directed by Shahed Ahmadlou (2006)
- The Report of an execution (Gozareshe Yek Edaam); directed by Ebrahim Sheibani (2007)
- Paper Daddy (Pedare Kaghazi); directed by: Alireza Eshaghi (2008)
- Life without me (Zendegi Bedoune Man); directed by Hossein Hekmatjoo (2008)
- The Eyewitness (Shahede Eini); directed by Mehdi Golestaneh (2008)
- The Reverse gear (Dandeh Makous); directed by Hassan Fathi (2009)
- Zigzag; directed by Majid Tavakolli (2009)
- Goodbye Tehran; directed by Mohammad Reza Rostami (2010)
- Boomerang; directed by Esmaeil Fallah-Pour (2011)
- A seat for 4 years (Sandalie 4 Saleh); directed by Mohsen Tavakoli (2013)
- Stranger to himself (Biganeh Ba Khod); directed by Jamshid BayatTork (2016)
- Tal'khoon (plot); directed by Alireza Amini (2008)

=== Director ===
- Slowness - 2010
- The Blue Bed - 2019
- Split Ends - 2022
- The Gold Teeth - 2022
- Hatch - 2024
- Light Through the Blindfold - 2026

== Awards and nominations ==
- Winner the prize of the Best Screenplay in IRIB Annual Awards for The Lost (2001)
- Winner the prize of the Best Screenplay in IRIB Annual Awards for A passenger from India (2002)
- Winner the prize of the Best Screenplay in Hafez Awards for The Forbidden Fruit (2007)
- Nominated for Best Screenplay in 14th Donya-ye Tasvir Award for Sounds of Rain (2014)
- Nominated for Best Screenplay in 17th Donya-ye Tasvir Award for A Romance (2017)
- Nominated for best TV Movie screenplay in Shahr Film Festival for The Reverse Gear (2010)
- Nominated for best TV Movie screenplay in Jaam-e-Jam Film Festival for The Reverse Gear (2011)
