= Kambiz Dirbaz =

Iranian film and television actor

- کامبیز دیرباز
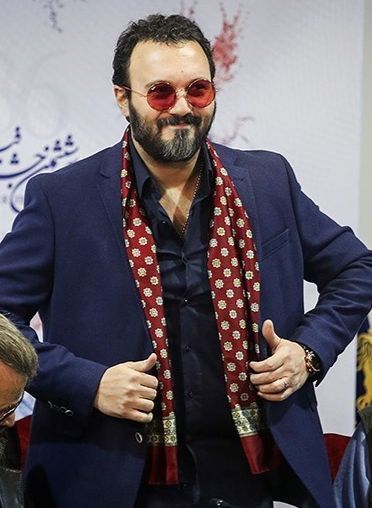
- Dirbaz at the 2018 Fajr Film Festival
- Born: September 3, 1975 (age 50); Tonekabon, Mazandaran, Iran
- Occupation: Actor
- Years active: 1997–present
- Height: 183 cm (6 ft 0 in)
- Children: 1

Kambiz Dirbaz (Persian: کامبیز دیرباز; born September 3, 1975) is an Iranian actor. He is best known for his roles in Duel (2006), The Outcast (2007), In the Eye of the Wind (2009–2010), and Michael (2015). He has received various accolades, including a Crystal Simorgh.

== Career ==
He was awarded the Crystal Simorgh for Best Actor in a Supporting Role at the Fajr International Film Festival for Duel in 2004. Other noted roles include Majid, the martyr in The Outcast (2007), and an almost silent role in Parviz Shahbazi's Karat 14 (2009). On television, he has appeared in Cold Fever, No Pain, No Gain, In the Eye of the Wind, Michael, in which he played the title character. He also had a cameo role in the controversial series Gando (2019).

== Filmography ==
=== Film ===
| Year | Title | Role | Director | In Persian | Notes |
|---|---|---|---|---|---|
| 1999 | Girls in Expectancy | Hesami | Rahman Rezaei | Dokhtarane Entezar | |
| 2003 | Melody | | Abolqasem Talebi | Melodi | |
| 2004 | Duel | Yahya | Ahmad Reza Darvish | Doel | |
| 2005 | Whirlpool | | Hassan Hedayat | Gerdab | |
| 2006 | In the Name of the Father | Meysam | Ebrahim Hatamikia | Be name pedar | |
| 2007 | The Outcast | Majid Suzuki | Masoud Dehnamaki | Ekhraji Ha | |
| 2007 | Imitator of the Devil | | Afshin Sadeghi | Moghalede Sheytan | |
| 2007 | Vertigo | Rashid | Tony Zarrindast | Sargije | |
| 2008 | A True Report | Jalal | Dariush Farhang | Yek Gozareshe Vaghe'ei | |
| 2008 | The Cast Back | | Reza Karimi | Enekas | |
| 2009 | Cottage | | Javad Afshar | Kolbe | |
| 2009 | Karat 14 | Mansour | Parviz Shahbazi | Ayare 14 | |
| 2009 | The Outcast 2 | Majid Suzuki | Masoud Dehnamaki | Ekhraji Ha 2 | |
| 2010 | First Condition | | Masoud Atyabi | | |
| 2011 | The Outcast 3 | Majid Suzuki | Masoud Dehnamaki | Ekhraji Ha 3 | |
| 2011 | Golden Cage | | Tony Zarrindast | Ghafase Talayi | |
| 2013 | Ash and Snow | | Rouhollah Sohrabi | Khakestar O Barf | |
| 2014 | Resident of the Middle Floor | | Shahab Hosseini | Saken Tabagheye Vasat | |
| 2014 | A Good Sleep | | Arash Ghaderi | Khabe Khosh | |
| 2016 | Lunar Eclipse | | Masoud Atyabi | Mahgereftegi | |
| 2018 | Misunderstanding | | Ahmad Reza Motamedi | Soe Tafahom | |
| 2018 | Insanity | | Kamran Ghadakchian | Jonoon | |
| 2019 | Top Gear | Sattar | Mohammad Ahangarani | Takhte Gaz | |
| 2020 | Exodus | Security Agent | Ebrahim Hatamikia | Khorooj | |
| 2021 | The Sniper | Abdorrasul Zarrin | Ali Ghafari | Tak Tirandaz | |
| 2022 | 2888 | | Keyvan Alimohammadi; Aliakbar Heydari | 2888 | |
| 2022 | The Future | | Amir Pourkian | Ayande | |
| 2023 | Around 8 AM | | Manouchehr Hadi | Hodoode Saat 8 | |
| 2024 | Alligator Blood | Himself | Javad Ezzati | Temsahe Khooni | Cameo |

=== Web ===
| Year | Title | Role | Director | Platform | In Persian |
|---|---|---|---|---|---|
| 2013 | Iranian Dinner | Himself | Mohammad Shayesteh | Video CD | Sham e Irani |
| 2018 | North 13 | Himself | Alireza Amini | Video CD | 13 Shomali |
| 2018–2019 | Iranian Rally | Himself | Arash Moayerian | Video CD | Raliye IRani |
| 2020–2021 | Blue Blood | Shahnam | Behrang Tofighi | Filimo, Namava | Aghazadeh |
| 2021 | Mafia Nights | Himself | Saeid Aboutaleb | Filimo | Shabhaye Mafia |
| 2022–2024 | Godfather | Himself | Saeid Aboutaleb | Filmnet | PedarKhande |
| 2023–2024 | Mortal Wound | Masoud Toloui | Mohammad Hossein Mahdavian | Filimo | Zakhme Kari |

=== Television ===
| Year | Title | Role | Director | Network | In Persian | Notes |
|---|---|---|---|---|---|---|
| 2004 | Cold Fever | Peyman | Alireza Afkhami | IRIB TV3 | Tabe Sard | TV series |
| 2007 | Paridokht | Nosrat | Siroos Moghaddam | IRIB TV2 | Paridokht | TV series |
| 2009–2010 | In the Eye of the Wind | Nader Irani | Masoud Jafari Jozani | IRIB TV1 | Dar Cheshme Baad | TV series |
| 2010 | No Pain, No Gain | Asad Panbeh | Alireza Bazrafshan | IRIB TV3 | Naborede Ranj | TV series |
| 2013 | The Smell of Rain | Hatef Malekan | Hossein Tabrizi | IRIB TV2 | Booye Baran | TV series |
| 2014 | Punishment | Jahan | Hossein Tabrizi | IRIB TV2 | Mojazat | TV series |
| 2015 | Mr. and Mrs. Sangi | Saeed Sangi | Shahed Ahmadloo | IRIB TV3 | Agha Va Khanoome Sangi | TV series |
| 2015 | Michael | Michael Movahed | Siroos Moghaddam | IRIB TV1 | Mikaeil | TV series |
| 2016 | The Roof Top of Tehran | Ghiyas Safa | Behrang Tofighi | IRIB TV1 | Poshte Bame Tehran | TV series |
| 2017 | Under the Mother's Feet | Khalil Dashti | Behrang Tofighi | IRIB TV1 | Zire Paye Madar | TV series |
| 2019 | Special Condition | Asef Mehrmanesh; Mohammad Hossein Aliani | Vahid Amirkhani | IRIB TV3 | Sharayete Khas | TV series |
| 2019 | Gando | Mohsen | Javad Afshar | IRIB TV3 | Gando | TV series |
| 2019–2020 | Steering Wheel | The Executor | Masoud Sanam | IRIB Nasim | Dastfarman | TV program |

== Awards and nominations ==
| Award | Year | Category | Nominated Work | Result |
|---|---|---|---|---|
| Fajr Film Festival | 2004 | Best Actor in a Supporting Role | Duel | Won |
| Fajr Film Festival | 2006 | Best Actor in a Supporting Role | In the Name of the Father | Nominated |
| Fajr Film Festival | 2009 | Best Actor in a Supporting Role | Karat 14 | Nominated |
| Hafez Awards | 2005 | Best Actor – Television Series Drama | Cold Fever | Nominated |
| Hafez Awards | 2018 | Best Actor – Television Series Drama | Under the Mother's Feet | Nominated |
| Iran Cinema Celebration | 2005 | Best Actor in a Supporting Role | Duel | Nominated |
