= Hesam Manzour =

Iranian actor (born 1980)

- حسام منظور
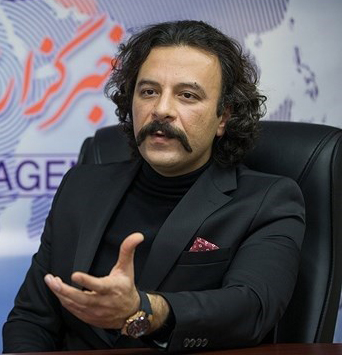
- Manzour in 2018
- Born: December 9, 1980 (age 45); Tehran, Iran
- Education: Tarbiat Modares University
- Occupation: Actor
- Years active: 2003–present

Hesam Manzour (Persian: حسام منظور; born December 9, 1980) is an Iranian actor. He is best known for his roles in the television dramas Lady of the Mansion (2018–2019), Dear Brother (2019) and Najla (2020–2022). In 2019, he won Hafez Award for Best Actor in a Drama Television series for portraying Arsalan Mirza in Lady of the Mansion.

== Filmography ==
=== Film ===
Year	Title	Role	Director	Notes	Ref(s)
2011	The Presiden's Cell Phone	Doctor	Ali Atshani		
2016	Taken	Mr. Baradari	Bojan Mirbagheri		
2022	Golden Blood	Mahmoud	Ebrahim Sheibani		
2023	Number 10		Hamid Zargarnezhad		
2024	Majnoon		Mehdi Shamohammadi		
2024	Paradise of Criminals		Masoud Jafari Jozani		
2024	Intoxicated by Love	Husam al-Din Chalabi	Hassan Fathi		
2025	Myrmidon		Ali Ghafari		

=== Web ===
Year	Title	Role	Director	Platform	Notes	Ref(s)
2021–2022	Island	Saeed Shahang	Siroos Moghaddam	Filimo	Main role	

=== Television ===
Year	Title	Role	Director	Network	Notes
2013	Their Common Times	Farid	Seyyed Jamal Seyyed Hatami	IRIB TV3	TV film
2017	Days of Restlessness	Alireza	Kazem Masoumi	IRIB TV3	TV series
2018–2019	Lady of the Mansion	Arsalan Mirza Quwanlu Qajar	Azizollah Hamidnezhad	IRIB TV3	TV series
2019	Dear Brother	Chavosh Nakhei	Mohammad Reza Ahanj	IRIB TV3	TV series
2020–2022	Najla	Abed Dashti	Kheirolah Toghyanipour	IRIB TV3	TV series

=== Music video ===
Year	Title	Artist	Ref(s)
2017	Prison	Mohsen Chavoshi	

== Awards and nominations ==
Year	Award	Category	Nominated work	Result
2016	13th Actor's Festival	Best Actor	Odyssey	Won
2019	19th Hafez Awards	Best Actor – Television Series Drama	Lady of the Mansion	Won
2009	Iran International University Theater Festival	Best Actor	Macbeth	Nominated
2019	5th Jam-e-Jam Television Festival	Best Actor	Lady of the Mansion	Won
