= Maryam Momen =

Iranian actress (born 1998)

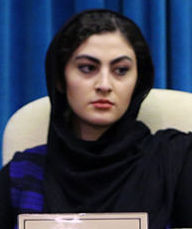
- Momen in 2019
- Born: 28 August 1998 (age 27); Meshginshahr, Ardabil, Iran
- Occupation: Actress
- Years active: 2015–present
- Spouse: Soheil Ghasedi (m. 2025)

Maryam Momen (Persian: مریم مؤمن; born 28 August 1998) is an Iranian actress. She is best known for her role as Fakhrolzaman Shalchi in Lady of the Mansion (2018–2019) for which she earned a Hafez Award nomination.

== Early life ==
Maryam Momen was born on 28 August 1998 in Meshginshahr, Ardabil, Iran.

== Personal life ==
On December 3, 2025, Momen officially announced her marriage to actor Soheil Ghasedi via a post on her official Instagram account.

== Filmography ==
=== Film ===
Year	Title	Role	Director	Notes	Ref(s)
2016	Migrate		Maryam Khodarahmi	Short film	
2021	Bride of Reedbed		Hadi Ramezanpour	Unreleased film	
2022	Kadoon		Kamal Moghaddam	Direct-to-video	
2022	A Childless Village	Doctor	Reza Jamali		
2024	Numbness		Kaveh Dehghanpour		

=== Web ===
Year	Title	Role	Director	Platform	Notes	Ref(s)
2020–2021	Mafia Nights	Herself	Saeed Aboutaleb	Filimo	Game show	
2022	The Sorcerer	Pari	Masoud Atyabi	Filimo, Namava	Main role; 13 episodes	
2023	Secret Army	Herself	Saeed Aboutaleb	Filimo	Game show	
2023	Z	Herself	Saeed Aboutaleb	Tamashakhaneh	Game show	
2023–2024	Mafia Nights: Zodiac	Herself	Mohammad Reza Rezaeean	Filimo	Game show	
2023	Chidemaneh	Herself	Iraj Tayefeh	Namava	Reality show	

=== Television ===
Year	Title	Role	Director	Network	Notes	Ref(s)
2018–2019	Lady of the Mansion	Fakhrolzaman Shalchi	Azizollah Hamidnezhad	IRIB TV3	Main role	
2020	Intrusive	Parinaz	Bahador Asadi	IRIB TV1	Main role	
2021	The Playfellow	Nooshin Rastegar	Soroush Mohammadzadeh	IRIB TV2	Supporting role	
2022	Sweet Troubles	Shirin Tamadon	Soheil Moafagh	IRIB TV5	Main role	
2025	Yazdan		Manouchehr Hadi	IRIB TV3	Supporting role	
2025	Ala		Shakil Mozaffari	IRIB TV3	Supporting role	
2025	Killing a Guest		Ahmad Kavari	IRIB TV1	Main role	

== Awards and nominations ==
Name of the award ceremony, year presented, category, nominee of the award, and the result of the nomination
Award	Year	Category	Nominated Work	Result	Ref(s)
Hafez Awards	2019	Best Actress – Television Series Drama	Lady of the Mansion	Nominated	
Jam-e-Jam Television Festival	2019	People's Choice Best Actress	Lady of the Mansion	Won	
