= Hengameh Ghaziani =

Iranian actress

- Persian: هنگامه قاضیانی
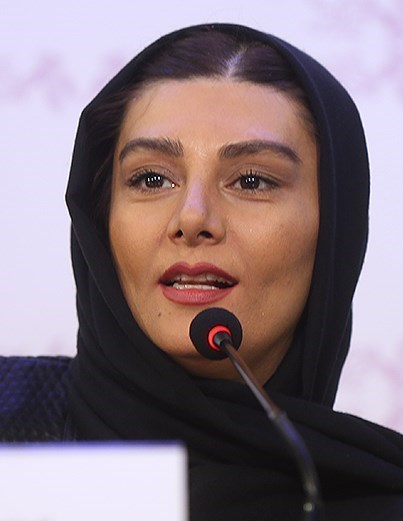
- Ghaziani at 34th Fajr International film
- Born: 20 May 1970 (age 56); Mashhad, Iran
- Education: Azad University; University of San Francisco
- Occupations: Actress, translator, singer
- Years active: 2000–2023
- Known for: As Simple as That
- Children: 1
- Awards: Crystal Simorgh for Best Actress
- Website: www.hghaziani.com

Hengameh Ghaziani (Persian: هنگامه قاضیانی; born 20 May 1970) is an Iranian former actress. She has received various accolades, including two Crystal Simorgh, a Hafez Award and an Iran Cinema Celebration Award.

She was arrested by the Iranian government in November 2022 during Mahsa Amini protests for publicly supporting the protesters.

== Early life ==
Hengameh Ghaziani was born on 20 May 1970 in Mashhad, Iran.

She has a BA in Human-Economic Geography from Islamic Azad University in Mashhad and Shahre-Rey, and has also studied Western Philosophy at San Francisco University.

== Career ==
Her acting career began in 2000 when she was cast in the movie Twilight, directed by Hassan Hedayt. Her first appearance on the theatre stage was in the play Like blood for steak which was produced by Leev theatre group.

Ghaziani translated Wilcomb E. Washburn's Red Man's Land/White Man's Law, a history book about the status of Native American. In 2015 she started a band with herself as the singer, which performed in Vahdat Hall.

She has received two Crystal Simorgh awards for Best Actress at the Fajr International Film Festival, in 2007 for As Simple as That and in 2011 for Days of Life.

== Arrest ==
Ghaziani and Katayoun Riahi were arrested in November 2022 for "provocative" social media posts and media activity. Both actresses had expressed solidarity with the protest movement and removed their headscarves in public.

== Awards ==
Awards	Description	Year
Hafez Awards	Best Actress – Television Series Drama nomination for her performance in Homeland (2023–2024)	2024
Crystal Simorgh	Winner of Best Actress in a Leading Role for the 26th Fajr International Film Festival for "As Simple As That"	2007
Hafez Prize and Diploma	Winner of Best Actress in a Leading Role for playing in the movie "As Simple As That"	2007
Varna	Winner of Best Actress in a Leading Role for Bulgarian Varna International Festival (Folly is Love) for "As Simple As That"	2008
Golden George Prize	Nominee of Best Actress in the Leading Role for Moscow International Film Festival for "As Simple As That"	2008
Crystal Simorgh	Winner of Best Actress in a Leading Role for the 30th Fajr International Film Festival for "Days of Life"	2011
Prize and Diploma	Winner of Best Actress in a Leading Role for Moqavemat International Film Festival for playing in the movie "Days of Life"	2011
	Nominee of Best Actress in the Leading Role for the 30th Fajr International Film Festival/New Vision Section for "Migraine"	2011
Prize and Diploma	Nominee of Best Actress in the Supporting Role for the Khaneh Cinema Film Festival	2011
	Winner of Best Actress in the Leading Role for Kerman's Fajr Film Festival for "Annunciation to a Third Millennium Citizen"	2012
Prize and Diploma	Winner of Best Actress in a Leading Role for the 16th Khaneh Cinema Film Festival	
	Nominee of Best Actress in the Leading Role for Iranian Criticizer Society Film Festival for "The Wedlock"	2014
Prize and Diploma	Winner of Best Actress in a Leading Role for the first Mother International Film Festival	2015
Prize and Diploma	Winner of Best Actress in a Leading Role for the 10th International 100-Seconds Film Festival	2016
	Nominee of Best Actress in the Supporting Role for the 12th Action on Film International Film Festival for "Resident of Middle Floor"	2016
	Nominee of Best Actress in a Leading Role for the 17th Donya-ye Tasvir Award Ceremony for "Delbari"	2017

== As film critic/ jury member ==
Member of Jury	Year
Member of Jury in Varna International Film Festival (Love is Folly)	2010
Member of Jury at Fajr International Film Festival	2010
Member of Jury at Fajr International Film Festival/ Saadat Section	2010
Member of Jury at Parvin Etesami International Film Festival	2011
Member of Jury at Fajr International Film Festival	2014
Member of Jury at Khaneh Cinema Film Festival	2014
Member of Jury at Parvin Etesami International Film Festival	2017

== Filmography ==
- Island (2021–2022)
- The Accomplice (2020)
- Hangovering Time (2018)
- Ordakly (2018)
- One Canary One Crow (2017)
- My Brother Khosrow (2016)
- Delbari (2016)
- Rabidity (2015)
- The Other One's Dad (2015)
- Ginkgo: Suspended Narrative (2015)
- Saken Tabaghe Vasat (2014)
- With Others (2014)
- Welcome to Tehran (2014)
- The Wedlock (2014)
- Annunciation to a Third Millennium Citizen (2013)
- I am a Mother (2012)
- Migren (2012)
- Days of Life (2012)
- Barf Rooye Shirvani Dagh (2011)
- Felicity Land (2011)
- Facing Mirrors (2011)
- Bidari-e Royaha (2010)
- Niloofar (2008)
- As Simple as That (2008)
- Ravayat haye na tamam (2007)
- The Loser (2004)
- Saye Roshan (2001)
