= Duel (2004 film) =

- Directed by: Ahmad Reza Darvish
- Written by: Ramin Mebdy
- Produced by: Taghi Aligholizadeh
- Starring: Saeed Rad; Pejman Bazeghi; Parivash Nazarieh; Parviz Parastui; Hedieh Tehrani; Anoushirvan Arjmand; Kambiz Dirbaz; Abolfazl Shah Karam
- Edited by: Mostafa Kherghehpoosh
- Music by: Majid Entezami
- Distributed by: Tamasha Cultural Institute
- Release date: 6 July 2004
- Running time: 137 minutes
- Country: Iran
- Language: Persian
- Budget: $6 Million USD

Duel (Persian: دوئل) is a 2004 Iranian war drama film It was directed by Ahmad Reza Darvish, who was mostly known for films about the Iran–Iraq War. Duel was shot in roughly 11 months in various cities of Iran. The first screening was at the Fajr International Film Festival, in 2004, where it won 8 Crystal Simorgh Award. Also, it is the first Iranian Movie to use Dolby Digital Sound. It is one of the most expensive independent movies ever made in Iranian cinema history.

== Plot ==
Zeinal, an Iranian soldier who has been a prisoner of war for more than 20 years, returns only to see that he has been deemed a traitor. The story revolves around Zeinal and Eskanadar who both are looking for a chest containing several important documents.

== Cast ==
- Pejman Bazeghi as Zeinal
- Saeed Rad as Eskandar
- Parivash Nazarieh as Salimeh
- Parviz Parastui as Yousef
- Hedieh Tehrani as Hanieh
- Kambiz Dirbaz as Yahya
- Anoushirvan Arjmand as Latif
- Vahid Rahbani as Esmail
- Mehdi Saki as Assad
- Abolfazl Shah Karam as Mansour
- Ali Mardaneh as Ghasem
- Nasrin Seaghat
- Hossein Saharkhiz
- Mohammad Ranjbar
- Rahman Bagherian
- Tooraj Faramarzian
- Shirin Dejagah
- Abdolhossein Tosheh
- Hossein Afshar
- Mohammad Afravi
- Arash Sarban
- Sudabeh Alipour
- Ahmad Sarafraz
- Hossein Majdzadeh
- Abbas Asakereh

== Reception ==
- Variety: An invigorating men-in-war movie, with an almost "Three Kings"-like flavor, Iranian action-drama "The Duel" will come as a pleasant surprise to auds sated by either peasant dramas or arty, metaphorical fare from the region. Punchily directed by Ahmad Reza Darvish, with a real sense of the smoke, noise and chaos of battle, this smart, well-played drama deserves wider recognition through the festival circuit as an example of quality commercial cinema from Iran. Ethnic-centered webs should also take note.

== Award ==
- Won Crystal Simorgh for Best Director Ahmad Reza Darvish – Fajr International Film Festival 2004
- Won Crystal Simorgh for Best Cinematography Bahram Badakshani – Fajr International Film Festival 2004
- Won Crystal Simorgh for Best Editor Mostafa Kherghehpoush – Fajr International Film Festival 2004
- Won Crystal Simorgh for Best Set & Costume Design Amir Esbati – Fajr International Film Festival 2004
- Won Crystal Simorgh for Best Sound Mix Hamid Naghibi – Fajr International Film Festival 2004
- Won Crystal Simorgh for Best Sound Mix Masoud Behnam – Fajr International Film Festival 2004
- Won Crystal Simorgh for Best Special Effects Mohsen Rouzbahani – Fajr International Film Festival 2004
- Won Crystal Simorgh for Best Sound Mix Frédéric Le Louet – Fajr International Film Festival 2004
- Won Crystal Simorgh Kambiz Dirbaz for Best Supporting Actor – Fajr International Film Festival 2004
- Won Special Award for Best Director Ahmad Reza Darvish – Moghavemat International Film Festival 2004
- Won Five Award for Best Sound Mix, Best Edit, Best Special Effects and Best Costume Design in House of Cinema 2004
- Won Special Jury Award for Best Director Ahmad Reza Darvish – Busan International Film Festival 2004

== Music ==
Music duel movie made by Majid Entezami, is That Including 20 Track. Have a different Entezami Album vestigial with Kamancheh, Bagpipes, Horn, Trombone, Ney and Trumpet in Choir.

=== Track listing ===
Duel

Soundtrack album by Majid Entezami
- Released: 11 November 2009
- Genre: International
- Length: 54:55
- Label: Irangaam

No.	Title	Artist(s)	Length
1.	"Esarat"	Majid Entezami	5:46
2.	"Meydan-e-Min"	Majid Entezami	3:03
3.	"Hojum"	Majid Entezami	1:05
4.	"Mehr"	Majid Entezami	2:19
5.	"Dagh-e-Nang"	Majid Entezami	1:09
6.	"Moghavemat"	Majid Entezami	1:49
7.	"Jashn-e-Rusta"	Majid Entezami	4:06
8.	"Arvand"	Majid Entezami	2:59
9.	"Nofuz"	Majid Entezami	5:12
10.	"Soghut"	Majid Entezami	2:06
11.	"Tufan"	Majid Entezami	2:13
12.	"Neshan-e-Eshgh"	Majid Entezami	1:34
13.	"Gharantineh"	Majid Entezami	2:11
14.	"Sandoghche"	Majid Entezami	2:15
15.	"Pishravi"	Majid Entezami	2:36
16.	"Bavar"	Majid Entezami	3:39
17.	"Zeinal"	Majid Entezami	3:34
18.	"Defa"	Majid Entezami	2:59
19.	"Didar"	Majid Entezami	1:26
20.	"Yadgar-e-Hanieh"	Majid Entezami	2:54
