= Human Comedy (2017 film) =

- کمدی انسانی
- Directed by: Mohammad Hadi Karimi
- Written by: Mohammad Hadi Karimi
- Produced by: Mohammad Hadi Karimi
- Starring: Arman Darvish; Alireza Shoja Noori; Bahareh KianAfshar; Houman Seyyedi; Hasti Mahdavifar; Leila Zare; Niki Karimi
- Cinematography: Morteza Ghafouri
- Music by: Behzad Abdi
- Distributed by: Hedayat Film
- Release date: 2017
- Running time: 100 min
- Country: Iran
- Language: Persian

Human Comedy (in Persian: کمدی انسانی; transliterated: Comedi Ensani) is a 2017 Iranian drama film directed, written and produced by Mohammad Hadi Karimi and about A comedy of the life of someone who must live like the people around him despite his own preference.

== Plot ==
Some decades ago, a boy was punished in school because he was a left-hander! As he grew up he was in the minority in other situations, and he was punished for it. At last, He decides to raise his inner capacity while being a minority and this is the beginning of his salvation...

== Awards ==
- NTFF - Norway Tamil Film Festival (2018) - Best Actor (Arman Darvish)
- NTFF - Norway Tamil Film Festival (2018) - Best Film (Mohammad Hadi Karimi)
