= As Simple as That (film) =

2008 film

- Film poster
- Directed by: Reza Mirkarimi
- Written by: Shadmehr Rastin; Reza Mirkarimi
- Produced by: Reza Mirkarimi
- Starring: Hengameh Ghaziani; Safa Aghajani
- Cinematography: Mohammad Aladpoush
- Edited by: Reza Mirkarimi
- Music by: Mehran Malakuti
- Release date: February 2008
- Running time: 97 minutes
- Country: Iran
- Language: Persian

As Simple as That (Persian: به همین سادگی, romanized: Be Hamin Sādegi) is a 2008 Iranian drama film directed by Reza Mirkarimi. It won the Golden George at the 30th Moscow International Film Festival. As Simple as That marks a milestone in current Iranian cinema as a rare realist depiction of a woman from the middle class.

== Cast ==
- Hengameh Ghaziani
- Safa Aghajani
- Parvaneh Ahmadi
- Ahmad Akeshteh
- Nastaran Hamdam Ali
- Nayereh Farahani
- Nireh Farhani
- Nastaran Hamdamali
- Haleh Homapour
- Mohsen Hosseini
- Mohammad Jafar Jafarpour
- Mehran Kashani
- Behnoosh Khaleghi
- Behnoosh Sadeghi
