= A Childless Village =

2022 Iranian film-in-film comedy film directed by Reza Jamali

- Directed by: Reza Jamali
- Produced by: Salman Abbasi
- Starring: Hamdollah Salimi; Behrouz Allahverdizadeh; Maryam Momen; Safat Ahari
- Cinematography: Abdollah Shokri
- Edited by: Amir Etminan; Homa Valizadeh
- Music by: Ali Maghazei
- Production company: Lost Conception
- Release date: 2022
- Running time: 81 minutes
- Country: Iran
- Language: Azerbaijani

A Childless Village (قرية بلا أطفال) is a 2022 Iranian film-in-film comedy drama film produced by Salman Abbasi and directed by Reza Jamali. The film stars Hamdollah Salimi, Behrouz Allahverdizadeh, Maryam Momen and Safat Ahari in the pivotal roles. The film tackles the subject matter revolving around the infertility of men in a village resulting in a childlessness situation. The film was set in Azerbaijan.

== Synopsis ==
A small village is shrouded in mystery as reportedly no children have been born for a considerable period of time and the blame is passed on to the women living in the village and the women are being questioned about their dignity. Men directly pass the blame on women assuming that the state of childlessness is due to the attitudes of the women and the marriages often ended up as failed attempts.

Two decades ago, an elderly well respectable filmmaker Kazem (Behrouz Allahverdizadeh) arrived to this particular rural village to shoot a documentary film about the situation pertaining to the childlessness situation and the mentality of the village women. However, things take a backseat as expected as village women wanted to protect their dignity and restore their pride by burning the footages recorded by the old filmmaker. Later on, it was proved with evidence that the men in the village are to be blamed as they are deemed as incapable of giving birth to children.

== Cast ==
- Hamdollah Salimi
- Behrouz Allahverdizadeh as Kazem
- Maryam Momen
- Safat Ahari

== Production ==
Filmmaker Reza Jamali announced his second feature film directorial venture after his critically acclaimed debut film Old Men Never Die (2019). He eventually joined hands with producer Salman Abbasi who was also coincidentally the producer of Jamali's debut film Old Men Never Die (2019). Jamali roped in actor Hamdollah Salimi who notably essayed the lead role the former's directorial debut.

The principal photography of the film was commenced with the idea of incorporating an element of a film-within-a-film format. The screenplay was developed by including documentary filming as the main underlying theme during the filmmaking whilst the documentary portions were included as subset of the main feature film to elevate the plot.

== Premiere ==
In November 2022, the film was premiered in the Critics’ Picks Competition at the 26th Tallinn Black Nights Film Festival. In December 2022, the film was screened at the 2nd edition of the Red Sea International Film Festival. In January 2023, it was also screened in the Cinema of the World section at the 21st Dhaka International Film Festival.

In November 2023, the film was premiered at the 16th edition of the International Human Rights Film Festival which was held in Vienna, Austria. In February 2024, the film was also chosen to be premiered at the 2nd edition of the Iranian Film Festival New York. In October 2024, it was officially selected as one of the Iranian films to be screened at the 12th Asian Film Festival Barcelona (AFFBCN).

== Accolades ==
Reza Jamali won the best screenwriter award during the 2022 Red Sea International Film Festival.
