= My Brother Khosrow =

- Film poster
- Directed by: Ehsan Biglari
- Written by: Ehsan Biglari; Parisa Hashempour
- Produced by: Saeid Malekan
- Starring: Shahab Hosseini; Hengameh Ghaziani; Nasser Hashemi; Bita Farrahi; Kamshad Kooshan
- Cinematography: Mohammad Reza Jahanpanah
- Edited by: Mostafa Kherghehpoosh
- Music by: Hamed Sabet
- Distributed by: FilmIran
- Release dates: February 2016 (Fajr International Film Festival); May 2017
- Running time: 90 minutes
- Country: Iran
- Language: Persian

My Brother Khosrow (Persian: برادرم خسرو, transit. Baradram Khosro) is a 2016 Iranian psychological film directed by Iranian director Ehsan Biglari. It is written by Parisa Hashempor and Ehsan Biglari himself. It produced by Saeid Malekan starring Shahab Hosseini as its leading cast.

This film which was its director's debut, was selected to be appeared in the New Look Section of the Fajr International Film Festival and screened on cinemas at May 2017.

It is a film about bipolar disorder and its consequences, which received a lot of controversial criticism among Iranian film critics.

== Story ==
Khosrow (Shahab Hosseini), is the leading character of the film, has the bipolar disorder which is a mental disorder, and per his situation he has to stay for a while in his brother's (Nasser) house who is a dentist. His situation and his relation between himself and his brother has consequences for him to confront.

== Cast ==
- Shahab Hosseini
- Hengameh Ghaziani
- Nasser Hashemi
- Bita Farrahi
- Kamshad Kooshan
- Hojjat Hassanpour
