= Yalda, a Night for Forgiveness =

2019 film directed by Massoud Bakhshi

- Film poster
- Directed by: Massoud Bakhshi
- Screenplay by: Massoud Bakhshi
- Produced by: Jacques Bidou; Marianne Dumoulin; Ali Mosaffa; Alexander Dumreicher-Ivanceanu; Bady Minck
- Starring: Sadaf Asgari; Behnaz Jafari; Babak Karimi; Arman Darvish; Fereshteh Hosseini; Bahram Afshar
- Cinematography: Julian Atanassov
- Edited by: Jacques Comets
- Production companies: JBA Production; NiKo Film; Close Up Films; Amour Fou Luxembourg; Schortcut Films; Tita B Productions; Ali Mosaffa Productions; Zweites Deutsches Fernsehen; Radio Télévision Suisse; SRG-SSR; VOO; BE TV; Panache Productions; La Compagnie Cinématographique
- Distributed by: Pyramide International; Little Dream Entertainment
- Release dates: 1 February 2019 (FIFF); 26 January 2020 (Sundance)
- Running time: 89 minutes
- Countries: Iran; France; Germany; Switzerland; Luxembourg
- Language: Persian
- Box office: $354,395

Yalda, a Night for Forgiveness (Persian: یلدا، شبی برای بخشش; original title: Yalda, Persian: یلدا) is a 2019 Iranian drama film directed by Massoud Bakhshi.

== Plot ==
The storyline is based on an actual top-rated Iranian reality television show. In this story, a young woman convicted of the murder of her much older husband faces the next-of-kin of the victim (his daughter), who has the power to grant her forgiveness and save the perpetrator from the death penalty. The young woman must plead for her life, while viewers can vote by SMS to help avoid the penalty by getting the sponsors to pay for the blood money.

The actual TV show Mah-e Asal (meaning “Honey Moon”) aired daily from 2007 to 2018 during the Islamic religious festival of Ramadan, and often collaborated with Iran's judicial system, which is based on Islamic law and includes the "eye for an eye" principle. The film has been transposed to Yaldā Night, an Iranian festival celebrated on the night of the winter solstice in the Northern Hemisphere.

== Cast ==
- Sadaf Asgari
- Behnaz Jafari
- Babak Karimi
- Arman Darvish
- Fereshteh Hosseini
- Bahram Afshar
- Kami Hejazi

== Release ==
Yalda premiered at the Fajr International Film Festival on 1 February 2019. It was selected for Sundance Film Festival in its 2020 edition.

The film was selected for the Adelaide Film Festival, Thalin International Film Festival, Warsaw International Film Festival, Brisbane International Film Festival, Lugano International Film Festival, Luxembourg International Film Festival, Helsinki International Film Festival, Vancouver International Film Festival, and Cork International Film Festival, among others.

== Awards ==
The film won the Grand Jury Prize for the World Cinema Dramatic Competition at the 2020 Sundance Film Festival, it won also the Grand prix Cinéma award of ELLE magazine, Best director award of Antalya International Film Festival 2020, Best Screenplay at the Sofia International Film Festival, Best script in Barcelona International Film Festival, and the Circle Award in Washington DC Film Destival. It was also nominated for a Lumière Award (equal to Golden Globe) in France, and in various categories at the Bergen International Film Festival, Berlin International Film Festival, and the Pingyao International Film Festival.
