= Cold Fever (TV series) =

2004 TV series

- Persian: تب سرد
- Genre: Drama-Crime
- Written by: Alireza Bazrafshan
- Directed by: Alireza Afkhami
- Starring: Shahab Hosseini; Hamid Goudarzi; Kambiz Dirbaz; Solmaz Ghani; Soroush Sehhat; Shahrzad Abdolmajid; Ilia Shahidifar
- Theme music composer: Ghasem Afshar
- Composer: Pirooz Arjmand
- Country of origin: Iran
- Original language: Persian
- No. of seasons: 1
- No. of episodes: 24

Production
- Producer: Ghasem Jafari
- Production location: Tehran-Northern Iran
- Editor: Samira Gholamzadeh
- Running time: 45-55 minutes

Original release
- Release: 6 April – 12 October 2004

Cold Fever (Persian: تب سرد) is an Iranian Drama, Crime series. The series is directed by Alireza Afkhami. The series has also been aired on iFilm since August 2024.

== Storyline ==
Shahab Kianfar (Shahab Hosseini) his factory is on the verge of bankruptcy, However, he tries to compete with his father-in-wife, He has prepared a luxurious life for his wife and by borrowing money, Save his factory. As Shahab's financial situation worsens, he decides to solve his problems by drawing up a plan and getting help from the Husband (Hamid Goudarzi) of a person who is nursing his child and has just been released from prison, But in the meantime, a murder happens, Which causes a police detective (Soroush Sehhat) to enter the story...

== Cast ==
- Shahab Hosseini
- Hamid Goudarzi
- Kambiz Dirbaz
- Solmaz Ghani
- Soroush Sehhat
- Shahrzad Abdolmajid
- Ilia Shahidifar
- Mehdi Solooki
- Mohsen Zahtab
- Farhad Jaberi Yazdi
- Mohammad Reza Kohestani
