= The Loser (2004 film) =

2004 Iranian short film

- Persian: بازنده
- Directed by: Ghasem Jafari
- Written by: Alireza Kazemipour
- Produced by: Dariush Babaeian; Manouchehr Zebardast
- Starring: Mohammad Reza Foroutan; Mitra Hajjar; Hamid Goodarzi; Soroush Sehhat; Ramtin Khodapanahi; Leila Boushehri; Hengameh Ghaziani; Katayoun Amirebrahimi; Majid Moshiri
- Cinematography: Rasool Ahadi
- Edited by: Hamid Seyfi
- Music by: Mohammad Mehdi Goorangi
- Production company: Shokufa Film
- Distributed by: 21 Century
- Release date: 28 September 2004
- Running time: 90 Min
- Country: Iran
- Language: Persian

The Loser (Persian: بازنده ; Bazandeh) is a 2004 Iranian Drama film directed by Ghasem Jafari.

== Plot ==
Saman (Mohammad Reza Foroutan), who has been a political refugee for five years, returns to Iran.Tabassom (Mitra Hajjar), who was Saman's fiancée before his trip, comes to greet him and tells him that their relationship is no longer possible because he has been married for three months. Saman commits suicide out of despair, but his brother Bijan saves him. Saman goes to Hamid (Hamid Goodarzi), Tabassom's husband, and, recalling his past and emphasizing that Tabassom was forced to marry him, asks him to divorce her. But Hamid refuses. Saman gets in Hamid's way using various excuses and gets into an argument with him....

== Cast ==
- Mohammad Reza Foroutan as Saman
- Mitra Hajjar as Tabassom
- Hamid Goodarzi as Hamid
- Soroush Sehhat
- Ramtin Khodapanahi
- Leila Boushehri
- Hengameh Ghaziani
- Katayoun Amirebrahimi
- Majid Moshiri
- Alirum Nouraei
- Nafiseh Roshan
- Abbas Shoghi
- Hasan Asadi
