= Queen of Beggars =

Iranian TV series

- Persian: ملکه گدایان
- Genre: Drama, Mystery
- Written by: Hamed Afzali; Amin Mahmoodi
- Directed by: Hossein Soheili Zadeh
- Starring: Baran Kosari; Arman Darvish; Farzad Farzin; Mohammad Reza Ghaffari; Pantea Bahram; Roya Nonahali; Reza Behboodi; Erfan Naseri; Shabnam Ghorbani; Yasna Mirtahmasb; Elham Korda; Solmaz Ghani; Ali Oji
- Country of origin: Iran
- Original language: Persian
- No. of seasons: 2
- No. of episodes: 30

Production
- Producers: Ali Tolouei; Rahman Seifi Azad
- Production location: Tehran
- Cinematography: Reza Sheybani
- Running time: 50 minutes

Original release
- Network: Filimo
- Release: 6 January – 11 August 2021

Queen of Beggars (Persian: ملکه گدایان) is an Iranian Drama Series directed by Hossein Soheili Zadeh.

== Storyline ==
Alborz Shams (Arman Darvish), a resident of Germany, returns to Iran for the death of his father, but in Iran everyone calls him Farhad Babaei and no one remembers him, not even his love Sara (Shabnam Ghorbani).

== Cast ==
- Baran Kosari
- Arman Darvish
- Farzad Farzin
- Mohammad Reza Ghaffari
- Pantea Bahram
- Roya Nonahali
- Reza Behboodi
- Erfan Naseri
- Shabnam Ghorbani
- Yasna Mirtahmasb
- Ali Salahi
- Elham Korda
- Solmaz Ghani
- Ali Oji
- Behshad Sharifian
- Noora Mohaghegh
- Maryam Sarmadi
- Sheyda Yousefi
- Arash Dehghan
