= The Cast Back =

- Persian: انعکاس
- Directed by: Reza Karimi
- Written by: Mohammad Hadi Karimi
- Produced by: Saeed Hajimiri
- Starring: Kambiz Dirbaz; Mahnaz Afshar; Hamid Goodarzi; Shohreh Ghamar; Bita Saharkhiz; Reza Razavi
- Cinematography: Faraj Heidari
- Edited by: Saeed Hajimiri
- Music by: Behnam Abtahi
- Distributed by: Sobhan Gostar; TDH Home Entertainment
- Release date: 13 June 2008
- Running time: 100 Min
- Country: Iran
- Language: Persian

The Cast Back (Persian: انعکاس ; Enekas) is a 2008 Iranian drama film directed by Reza Karimi.

== Plot ==
A young couple (Dirbaz and Afshar), each of whom is unwillingly subjected to a difficult test of loyalty.They have only two choices to make, The final choice of each of them will have a reflection on their life together.

== Cast ==
- Kambiz Dirbaz as Khojasteh
- Mahnaz Afshar as Nasim
- Hamid Goodarzi as Sina
- Shohreh Ghamar as Fereshteh
- Bita Saharkhiz as Sina's Wife
- Reza Razavi
- Mina Noroozi
- Mozhgan Taraneh
- Hasan Khansari
