= Goodbye (2011 film) =

2011 Iranian film

- Film poster
- Persian: به امید دیدار
- Directed by: Mohammad Rasoulof
- Written by: Mohammad Rasoulof
- Produced by: Mohammad Rasoulof
- Starring: Leila Zare; Roya Teymourian
- Cinematography: Arastoo Givi
- Edited by: Mohamadreza Muini
- Release date: 7 September 2011
- Running time: 100 minutes
- Country: Iran
- Language: Persian

Goodbye (Persian: به امید دیدار}, romanized: Be omid e didār) is a 2011 Iranian drama film written and directed by Mohammad Rasoulof. It offers a portrait of an Iranian citizen straining under curtailed personal freedoms.

== Cast ==
- Leila Zare
- Roya Teymourian
- Hasan Pourshirazi
- Behnam Tashakkor
- Fereshteh Sadreorafai
- Shahab Hosseini

== Plot ==
Noura (Leila Zare) is an attorney whose license has been revoked by the government. Her attempts at escape meet with ever-mounting roadblocks.

== Reception ==
On review aggregator Rotten Tomatoes, the film holds an approval rating of 100% based on 5 reviews, with an average rating of 7.1/10.
