= Pauline Chen =

Pauline W. Chen (born 1964), is a Taiwanese-American surgeon, author, and New York Times columnist. She is known for her 2007 book Final Exam: A Surgeon's Reflections on Mortality as well as her online column "Doctor and Patient". She is also the recipient of numerous awards including the UCLA Outstanding Physician of the Year Award in 1999 and the George Longstreth Humanness Award at Yale for most exemplifying empathy, kindness, and care in an age of advancing technology.

== Early life and career ==
Chen's parents are immigrants from Taiwan. Chen graduated from The Loomis Chaffee School, then attended Harvard University and the Feinberg School of Medicine at Northwestern University. She completed her general surgical training at Yale University, the National Cancer Institute, and UCLA. She was appointed faculty at UCLA, specializing in liver and kidney transplants and the treatment of cancer.
