= Raha (film) =

2025 Iranian drama film

- Directed by: Hesam Farahmand
- Written by: Mohammad Ali Hosseini
- Produced by: Saeed Khani
- Starring: Shahab Hosseini; Zoha Esmailifar; Ghazal Shakeri; Arman Mirzaee; Mohammad Reza Samian
- Cinematography: Rouzbeh Rayga
- Edited by: Mehdi Sa'di; Loghman Khaledi
- Music by: Fardin Khal'atbari
- Distributed by: Khaneh Ciname
- Release dates: January 31, 2025 (FIFF); February 27, 2025 (Iran)
- Country: Iran
- Language: Persian

Raha (Persian: رها, romanized: Rahā) is a 2025 Iranian drama film written by Mohammad Ali Hosseini, directed by Hesam Farahmand in his feature directorial debut, and starring Shahab Hosseini, Zoha Esmailifar, Ghazal Shakeri, Arman Mirzaee and Mohammad Reza Samian. It premiered at the 43rd Fajr Film Festival on January 31, 2025.

The film was released in Iran on February 27, 2025, by Khaneh Cinema.

== Cast ==
- Shahab Hosseini as Tohid
- Zoha Esmailifar as Raha
- Ghazal Shakeri as Soraya
- Arman Mirzaee as Soheil
- Mohammad Reza Samian as Arash
- Mohmmad Ashkanfar
- Hadi Eftekharzadeh
- Mahni Mehrpour
- Sepideh Pahlavanzadeh
- Bardia Dianat

== Reception ==
=== Awards and nominations ===
Award	Year	Category	Recipient	Result	Ref(s)
Fajr Film Festival	2025	Best Actor in a Leading Role	Shahab Hosseini	Nominated	
Fajr Film Festival	2025	Best Actress in a Supporting Role	Ghazal Shakeri	Nominated	
Fajr Film Festival	2025	Best Editor	Mehdi Sa'di, Loghman Khaledi	Nominated	
Fajr Film Festival	2025	Best Production Design	Rasoul Alizadeh	Nominated	
Fajr Film Festival	2025	Best First Film	Saeed Khani	Won	
Fajr Film Festival	2025	Best First Director	Hesam Farahmand	Nominated	
Fajr Film Festival	2025	Audience Choice of Best Film	Saeed Khani	Nominated	
