= Superstar (2009 film) =

2009 Iranian film

- Directed by: Tahmineh Milani
- Written by: Tahmineh Milani
- Produced by: Mohammad Nikbin
- Starring: Shahab Hosseini
- Cinematography: Alireza Zarrindast
- Edited by: Mastaneh Mohajer
- Music by: Nasser Cheshmeh Azar
- Release date: March 18, 2009
- Running time: 107 minutes
- Country: Iran
- Language: Persian

Superstar (in Persian: سوپر استار) is an Iranian film directed and written by Tahmineh Milani, produced in 2008 in Iran.

== Plot ==
Kourosh Zand (Shahab Hosseini), a spoiled Iranian screen idol, meets Raha Azimi (Fataneh Malek-Mohammadi), a teenage girl who claims to be his daughter. She moves in with him, disrupting his privileged lifestyle.

== Cast ==
- Shahab Hosseini - Kourosh Zand
- Nasrin Moghanloo - Shahla
- Fataneh Malek Mohammadi - Raha Azimi
- Sara Khoeiniha - Director's wife
- Elsa Firouz Azar - Sarah
- Reza Rashidpour - Kourosh' colleague
- Mohammad Reza Sharifinia - Director
- Narges Mohammadi - Stage Secretary
- Fariba Kosari - Mother of Kourosh
- Leila Zare
- Afsaneh Bayegan
- Tina Taherizadeh - Beggar child

== Reception ==
Reviewers have compared Superstar unfavourably to Milani's previous films, with Chicago Reader reviewer J R Jones stating "Milani is best known for films exposing the plight of women in the Islamic republic [...] Any such themes are downplayed in this sentimental story", and in the Los Angeles Times, Gary Goldstein says that "Tahmineh Milani is considered one of Iran's most accomplished filmmakers, but you wouldn't necessarily glean that from her disappointing drama: Superstar".

However, LA Weekly reviewer Tim Grierson notes that "at least Superstar exhibits a tender, intelligent sweetness, which helps to temper the utter conventionality and more melodramatic moments".

== Awards and nominees ==
Year	Award	Category	Nominated	Result
2008	Dhaka International Film Festival	Best Actress	Fataneh Malek Mohammadi	Won
2008	Dhaka International Film Festival	Best Cinematographer	Alireza Zarrindast	Won
2009	Fajr Film Festival	Crystal Simorgh (Best Actor)	Shahab Hosseini	Won
