= Leila Zare =

Iranian actress

- لیلا زارع
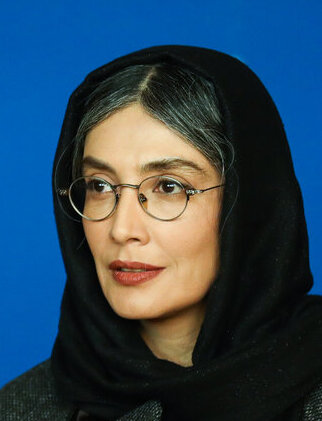
- Zare in 2022
- Born: 13 October 1980 (age 45); Tehran, Iran
- Occupation: actress
- Years active: 2005-present
- Notable work: Night Shift; Goodbye

Leila Zare (Persian : لیلا زارع, born 13 October 1980 in Tehran, Iran) is an Iranian actress known for her roles in We Are All Fine (2005), Goodbye (2011) and Night Shift (2015).

== Career ==
Zareh was nominated under the category of "Best Performance by an Actress" in the Asia Pacific Screen Awards, and won the Crystal Simorgh under the category of "Best Supporting Actress" for her role in Ma Hameh Khoubim in 2005, in the 23rd Fajr International Film Festival. In 2015, she was awarded the Diploma of Honour under the category of "Best Actress" for the film; Shift-e Shab in the 33rd Fajr International Film Festival. Her notable works include the role of Noura in the 2011 film Goodbye, Nahi in 2015's Night Shift, and Nahid in We Are All Fine.

== Filmography ==
- 2021: Anti
- 2020: Blood
- 2020: Filicide
- 2019: Dell (TV Series)
- 2019: Reverse
- 2017: Azar
- 2017: Forbidden
- 2017: Human Comedy
- 2017: Phenomenon
- 2016: Final Exam
- 2016: Samfonie Tavalod
- 2015: Night Shift
- 2013: The Little Sparrows
- 2011: Goodbye
- 2010: Leila's Dream
- 2009: Superstar
- 2009: Postchi se bar dar nemizanad
- 2008: Majnoone leyli
- 2007: Mika
- 2006: Khaneye roshan
- 2005: We Are All Fine

== See also ==
- List of Iranian actresses
