= Lady of the Mansion =

Iranian TV series

- Persian: بانوی عمارت
- Genre: Romance; Historical; Melodrama
- Written by: Ehsan Javanmard
- Directed by: Azizollah Hamidnezhad
- Starring: Maryam Momen; Pantea Panahiha; Hesam Manzour; Mina Vahid
- Music by: Fardin Khalatbari
- Ending theme: "What Happened..." by Mohsen Chavoshi
- Composer: Fardin Khalatbari
- Country of origin: Iran
- Original language: Persian
- No. of seasons: 1
- No. of episodes: 34

Production
- Producer: Majid Molaei
- Production locations: Tehran; Kashan; Ghazvin
- Cinematography: Alireza Ranjbaran
- Editors: Reza Kordbacheh; Hossein Ghazanfari
- Running time: 45 minutes

Original release
- Release: November 27, 2018 – January 6, 2019

Lady of the Mansion (Persian: بانوی عمارت, romanized: Banou-yeh Emarat) is an Iranian historical romance melodrama television series directed by Azizollah Hamidnezhad and written by Ehsan Javanmard, which aired on IRIB TV3 from 27 November 2018 to 6 January 2019 for 34 episodes.

== Plot ==
The lady of the mansion narrates a romantic melodrama at a time in the history of the Qajar period, in which the most important political event of that time, namely the assassination of Nasser al-Din Shah by Mirza Reza Kermani, is also discussed.

== Cast ==
- Maryam Momen as Fakhrolzaman Shalchi
- Pantea Panahiha as Afsarolmolouk
- Hesam Manzour as Arsalan Mirza Quwanlu Qajar
- Mina Vahid as Javaher
- Shabnam Farshadjoo as Mehral Nesae
- Niki Nasirian as Ahoo
- Alireza Shoja-e Noori as Tabibol Atbae
- Ramtin Khodapanaho as Mirza Asad Shalchi
- Mohammad Zarei as Younes
- Saleh Mirza Aghaei as Jahanbakhsh Mirza
- Ghazal Shakeri as Behjatolmolouk
- Majid Saeedi as Yavar Sharifi

== Reception ==
=== Awards and nominations ===
Tear	Award	Category	Recipient	Result
2019	19th Hafez Awards	Best Television series	Lady of the Mansion	Won
2019	19th Hafez Awards	Best Screenplay in a Television series	Ehsan Javanmard	Won
2019	19th Hafez Awards	Best Director in a Television series	Azizollah Hamidnezhad	Won
2019	19th Hafez Awards	Best Actor in a Drama Television series	Hesam Manzour	Won
2019	19th Hafez Awards	Best Actor in a Drama Television series	Majid Saeedi	Nominated
2019	19th Hafez Awards	Best Actress in a Drama Television series	Pantea Panahiha	Won
2019	19th Hafez Awards	Best Actress in a Drama Television series	Maryam Momen	Nominated
2019	19th Hafez Awards	Best Original Song	Mohsen Chavoshi	Nominated
