= The Fifth Reaction =

The Fifth Reaction (Persian: واکنش پنجم) is an Iranian film which was made in 2003, written by Mehrnoosh Khorsand and directed by Tahmineh Milani. The main super stars are Niki Karimi, Jamshid Hashempur, Shahab Hosseini and Merila Zarei.

The film depicts Fereshteh's adversities, an underpaid school teacher, after she loses her husband in an accident, so her father-in-law takes the custody|custody]] of her two sons unless she marries his younger remaining son. Fereshteh makes up her mind, and decides to escape abroad by the aid of her friends, so she can take care of her sons; however, her father-in-law suspects and in a hot pursuit, throws her in jail.

The Fifth Reaction, released in 2003, reveals how the patriarchal society views women, and their cultural position. It is Tahmineh Milani's seventh movie regarding women's social position and rights in a patriarchal society which encourages women to struggle to get their human rights back. The movie reflects the inability of Iranian women to take any action in a patriarchal society, and its major concerns are female identity, women's position and power in the society, sexism, the social inequality and injustice, and mainly law's ignoring women's rights in child custody case. Tahmine Milani has related to these matters to awaken women and inspire them to fight for their rights. Fortunately, her works have a great impact on women's awareness and inspire them to try for their social improvement.

== Plot ==
The opening scene of the film captures Fereshteh among her four other friends and colleagues in a luxury restaurant, gathering for lunch to comfort Fereshteh for the loss of her husband. Typical for this feminist women, they always discuss about their personal problems as women in Iran in their patriarchal society and decide to make feminist movements to stop the inequality and injustice towards women; however, they always talk without taking any further steps. As Fereshteh's father-in-law takes the custody of her two sons, her friends, unlike her lawyer, find it just the perfect opportunity to stand against men. Entertaining themselves with the battle between Fereshteh and her father-in-law, they help her to escape abroad. This game goes on while each competitor tries to score more. Finally, the father-in-law arrests Fereshteh in Bushehr while she is trying to escape to Dubai through seaway. In the closing scene of the movie, we see the patronizing, snobbish and arrogant presence of the father-in-law as his shadow darkens Fereshteh's face as he stands above her in jail and conditions her freedom to his own terms. The father-in-law with his indescribable power is far "too extreme to be a credible character" due to all injustice he brings to Fereshteh, the lonely woman who valiantly fights in the battle and draws the admiration of the audience. His ego, selfishness and pursuit for his individual desires points to his psychological impediment to perceive women other than weak creatures who have no power to encounter men.
