= Ghazal Shakeri =

Iranian actress (born 1979)

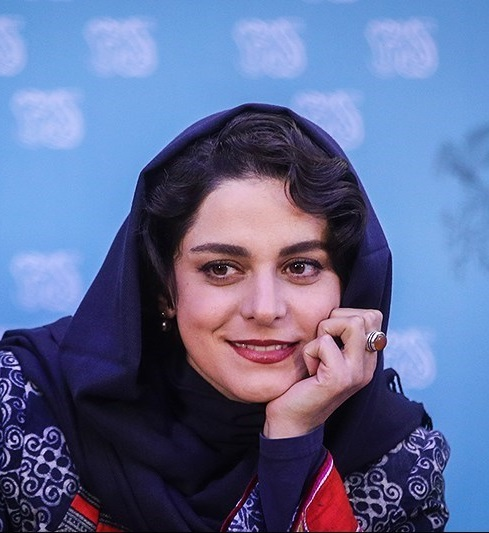
- Shakeri at the 2017 Fajr International Film Festival
- Born: March 13, 1979 (age 47); Tehran, Iran
- Education: Azad University (BA)
- Occupations: Actress; singer; set designer; interior designer
- Years active: 1987–present
- Spouse: Mehrdad Hashemi (m. 2024)
- Mother: Fereshteh Taerpour

Ghazal Shakeri (Persian: غزل شاکری; born March 13, 1979) is an Iranian actress and singer. She is best known for her roles in Facing Mirrors (2011), Shahrzad (2015–2016), and Sara and Ayda (2017). Shakeri has received four Crystal Simorgh nominations for her performances in Facing Mirrors, Sara and Ayda, Sima's Unfinished Narration (2023), and Raha (2025).

== Filmography ==
=== Film ===
Year	Title	Role	Director	Notes	Ref(s)
1987	The Fish		Kambuzia Partovi		
1988	Golnar	Golnar	Kambuzia Partovi		
2006	When Everybody Was Asleep		Fereydoun Hassanpour		
2011	Facing Mirrors	Rana	Negar Azarbayjani		
2017	Sara and Ayda	Sara	Maziar Miri		
2018	Aunt Frog	(voice)	Afshin Hashemi		
2019	Once a Woman		Jalil Akbari		
2020	Tuneless Instruments	Hedieh	Ali Hazrati		
2023	Sima's Unfinished Narration	Sima	Alireza Samadi		
2025	Juliet and the King	(voice)	Ashkan Rahgozar	Animation	
2025	Raha	Soraya	Hesam Farahmand		

=== Web ===
Year	Title	Role	Director	Platform	Notes	Ref(s)
2015–2016	Shahrzad	Azar Goldarei	Hassan Fathi	Lotus Play	Supporting role; season 1	
2021	Once Upon a Time in Iran	Fahimeh Akbar	Tina Pakravan	Namava	Guest appearance; 1 episode	
2021–2022	Island	Narges	Sirous Moghaddam	Filimo	Main role	
2022–2023	Jeyran	Ezzat ed-Dowleh	Hassan Fathi	Filimo	Main role	

=== Television ===
Year	Title	Role	Director	Network	Notes	Ref(s)
2012	Even If It's Night	Ava	Monir Gheidi	IRIB TV4	TV film; leading role	
2018–2019	Lady of the Mansion	Behjatolmolouk	Azizollah Hamidnezhad	IRIB TV3	TV series; supporting role	

== Awards and nominations ==
Name of the award ceremony, year presented, category, nominee of the award, and the result of the nomination
Award	Year	Category	Nominated Work	Result	Ref(s)
Fajr Film Festival	2011	Best Actress in a Leading Role	Facing Mirrors	Nominated	
Fajr Film Festival	2017	Best Actress in a Leading Role	Sara and Ayda	Nominated	
Fajr Film Festival	2023	Best Actress in a Supporting Role	Sima's Unfinished Narration	Nominated	
Fajr Film Festival	2025	Best Actress in a Supporting Role	Raha	Nominated	
Hafez Awards	2025	Best Actress – Motion Picture	Raha	Won	
Iran Cinema Celebration	2018	Best Actress in a Leading Role	Sara and Ayda	Won	
