= Amir Ghavidel =

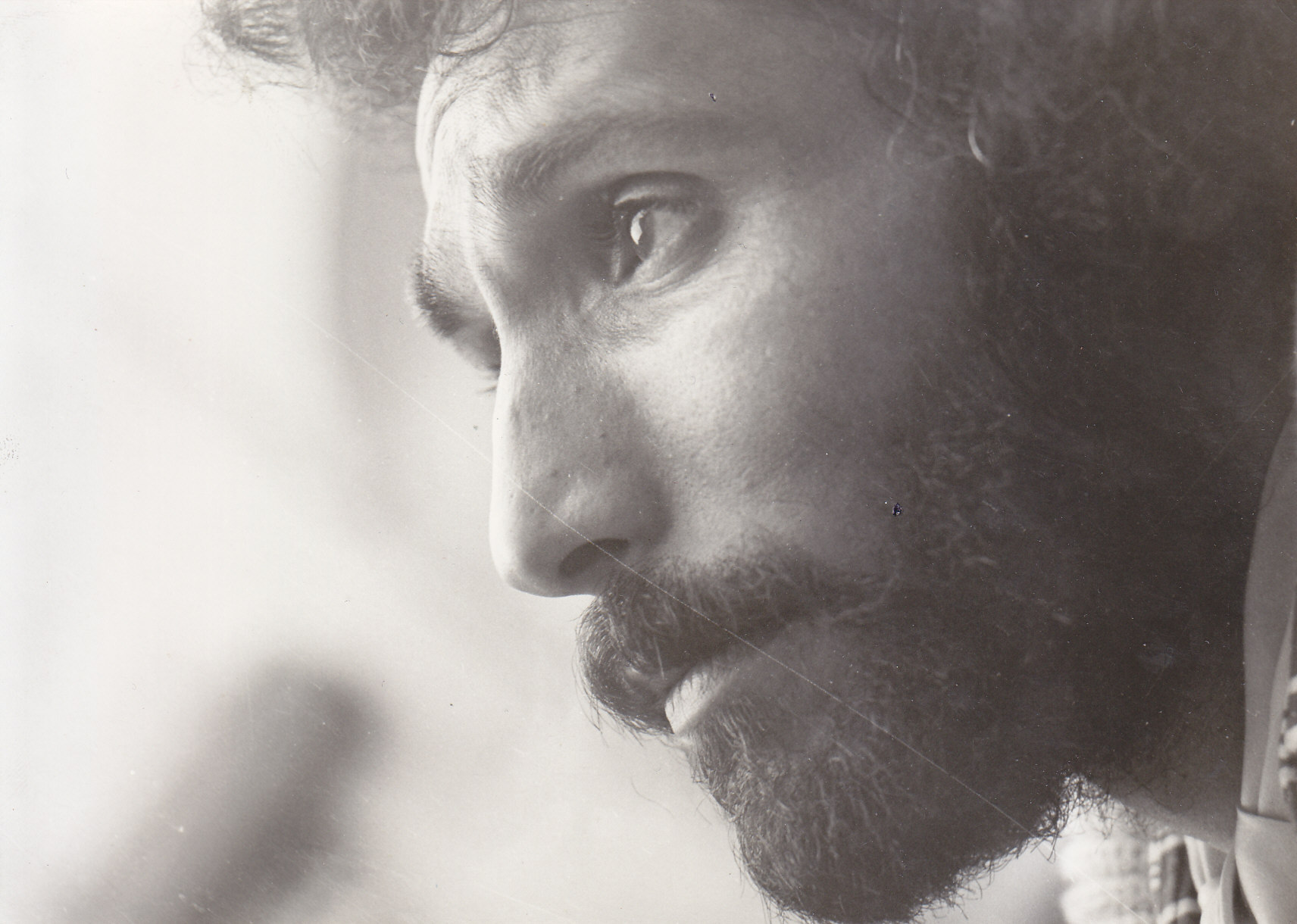
- Born: January 22, 1947; Mashad
- Died: 8 November 2009 (aged 62); Tehran
- Occupation: Filmmaker, Writer
- Years active: 1975 – 2009
- Children: Rama Ghavidel, Nima Ghavidel, Sina Ghavidel

Amir Ghavidel (Persian: امیر قویدل) (22 March 1947 – 8 November 2009) was an Iranian writer and filmmaker.

He started his artistic life at a young age from performing street theatre in his hometown Mashad, before moving to Tehran where he officially started his career in the cinema of Iran. Ghavidel was a screenwriter and director for ten feature films in his career.

== Career in cinema ==
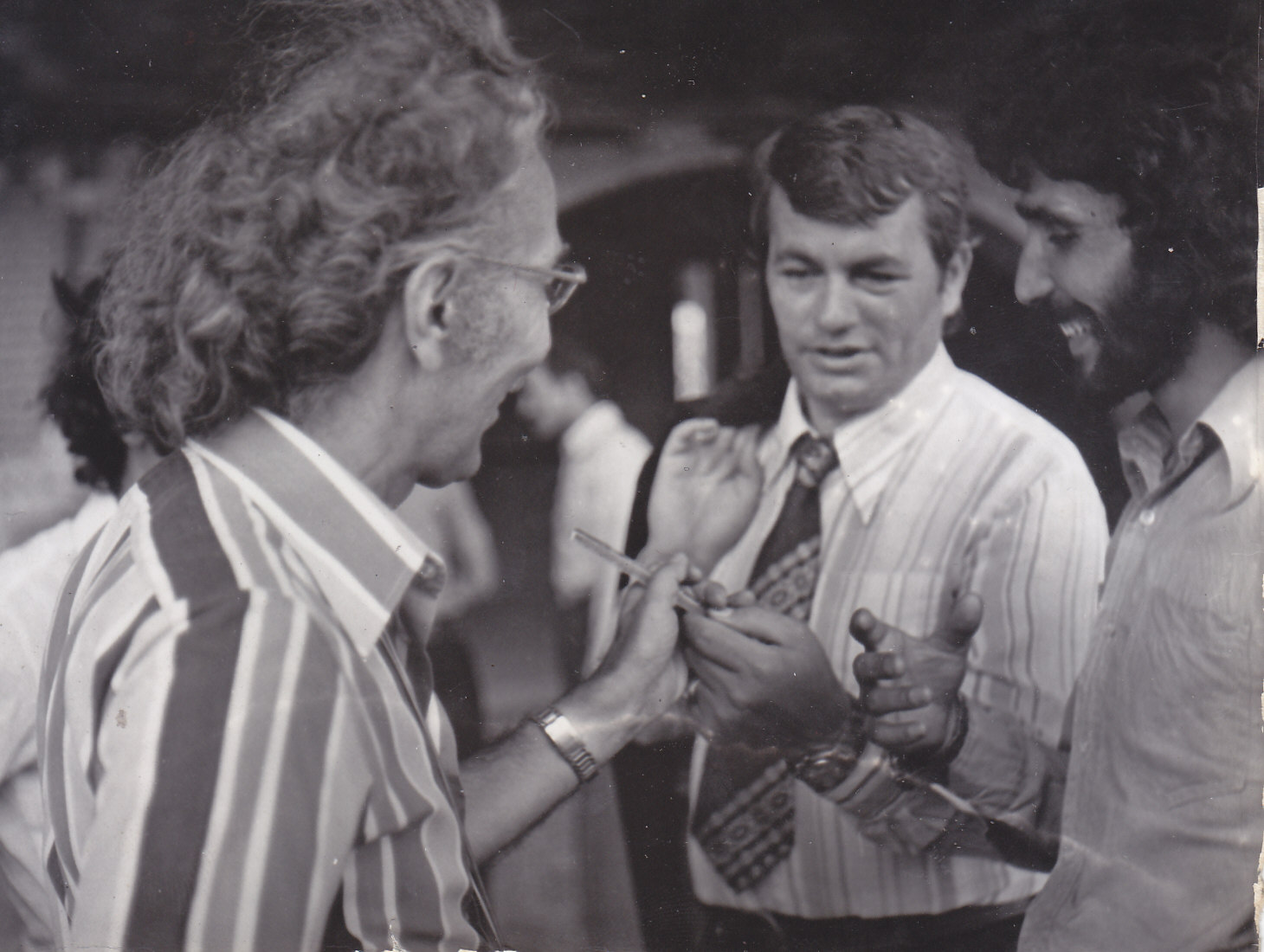
Ghavidel and Khachikian

=== Before the Iranian revolution ===
Ghavidel started as a screenwriter and an assistant director to Samuel Khachikian for Death in the Rain (مرگ در باران) in 1975. He continued to write Agitation (اضطراب) and The South's Shark (کوسه ی جنوب) and acted as assistant director to Samuel Khachikian for these films in the next three years.

=== After the Iranian revolution ===
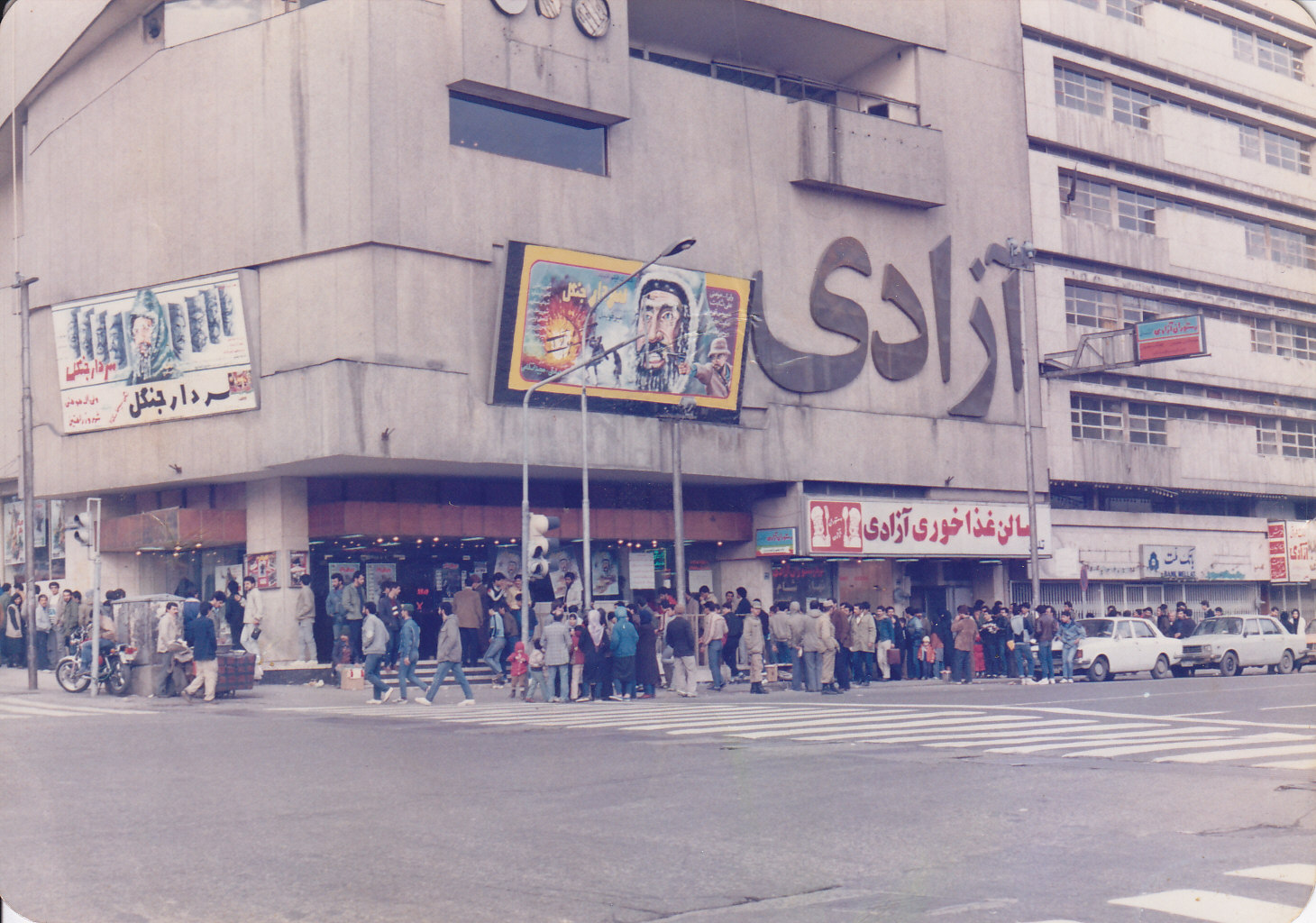
People lining up to see Ghavidel's film Sardar-e-Jangal in 1983

With the Iranian Revolution and the volatile state of cinema in those days, Ghavidel made films based on Iran's post-revolution social and political concerns and established himself as a filmmaker of modern Iranian cinema. He made his first work, Rain of Blood (خونبارش) as a documentary feature film produced by Rasul Sadrameli in 1980, one year after the revolution. Faramarz Gharibian won the Crystal Simorgh for Best Actor for two of Ghavidel's films Train (ترن) and The Misty Harbour (بندر مه آلود), and Majid Entezami was nominated for best film score for Train.

== Death ==
Ghavidel passed away as a result of complications due to liver failure on 8 November 2009 in Tehran.

== Filmography ==
=== Director ===
- A Friend Made of Fire (2009)
- Dayereh Tardid (TV Series) (2003)
- Rokhsareh (2002)
- Shab Cheragh (TV Series) (2002)
- The Misty Harbour (1992)
- Del Namak (1990)
- Galan (1990)
- Train (1988)
- Bloody Rice (1984)
- Mirza Koochak Khan (1983)
- Sardar-e Jangal (1983)
- A Little Tale (Short) (1980)
- Rain of Blood (1980)

=== Writer ===
- The Misty Harbour (1992)
- Galan (1990)
- Train (1988)
- Bloody Rice (1984)
- Mirza Koochak Khan (1983)
- Sardar-e Jangal (1983)
- A Little Tale (Short) (1980)
- Rain of Blood (1980)
- Tonight A Tear Is Shed (1979)
- The South's Shark (1978)
- Agitation (1976)
- Death in the Rain (1975)

=== Assistant Director ===
- The Eagles (1985)
- Farman (1982)
- The South's Shark (1978)
- Agitation (1976)
- Death in the Rain (1975)

=== Art Director ===
- Train (1988)
