= Mitra Hajjar =

Iranian actress (born 1977)

- میترا حجار
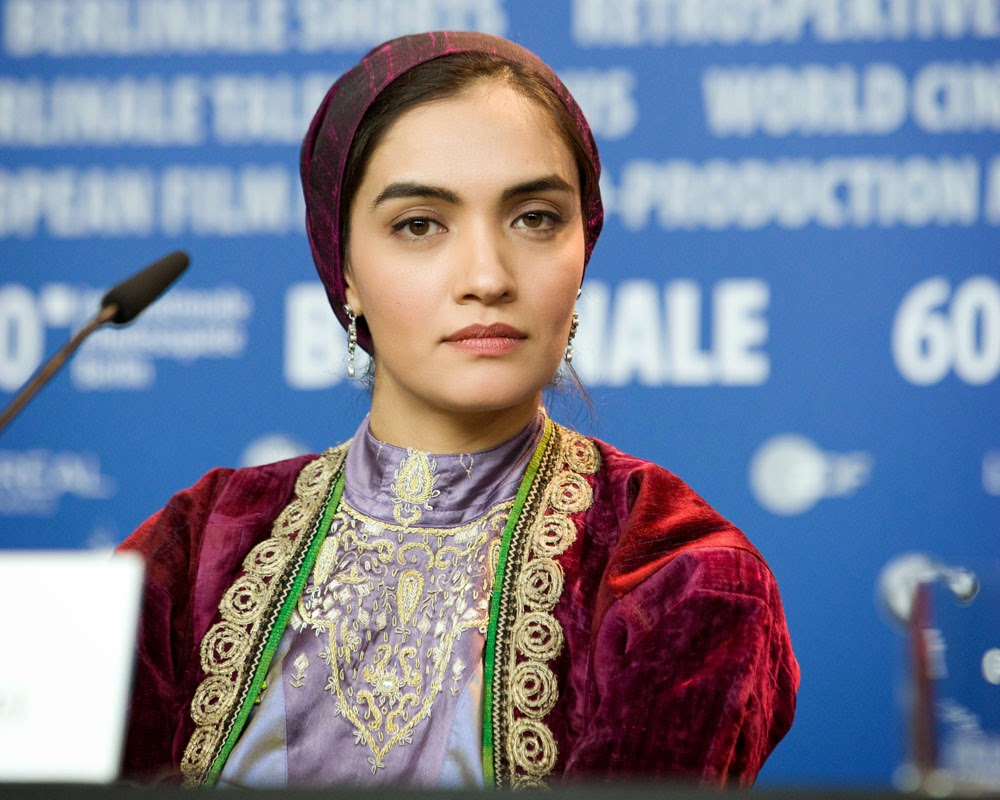
- Hajjar at the 2010 Berlin International Film Festival
- Born: February 3, 1977 (age 49); Mashhad, Iran
- Education: Tehran University of Art
- Occupation: Actress
- Years active: 1998–present

Mitra Hajjar (Persian: میترا حجار; born February 4, 1977) is an Iranian actress. She has received various accolades, including a Crystal Simorgh, in addition to nominations for three Hafez Awards, an Iran Cinema Celebration Award and an Iran's Film Critics and Writers Association Award.

== Career ==
Hajjar started acting with "Strangely" directed by Ahmad Amini. She has also starred in TV series, most notably "Young Police". She has acted in the theatrical show "Uncle Vania" in France.

In 2005, she left Iran for France, and then went to America to study directorship. She lived abroad for 3 years, and she also played in an episode of the American Show "Smith". She received a nomination for the best actress in a supporting role for the movie "Long Goodbye". Hajjar was named the best actress in her film Wishbone. Ub 2022, she was arrested in Iran on charges of supporting the Mahsa Amini protests.

== Awards and nominations ==
Hajjar has received significant recognition for her acting:

- Crystal Simorgh: Winner, Best Actress in a Leading Role for Born Under Libra (2000). She was also nominated for Best Actress in a Supporting Role for Killing Mad Dogs (2001) and Best Actress in a Leading Role for Pink(2003).
- Hafez Award: Nominated for Best Performance by an Actress in a Motion Picture (2003).
- Jury Award: Winner, Best Actress in Feature Film (2017) for her film Wishbone.

Her film It's Winter (2006) received a nomination at the 56th Berlin International Film Festival. She was also nominated for Best Actress in a supporting role for the movie "Long Goodbye."

== Selected filmography ==
- The Cry, 1999
- Born under Libra, 2001
- Protest, 2000
- Killing Mad Dogs, 2001
- Nights of Tehran 2001
- Rokhsareh, 2002
- The Poisonous Mushroom, 2002
- Pink (2003 film), 2003
- Alghazali - The Alchemist of happiness, 2004
- The Intruder, 2002
- The Fugitive, 2003
- The Crime, 2004
- The Loser, 2004
- It's Winter, 2006
- The Secrets, 2007
- This Is Not A Love Song, 2007
- The Hunter, 2010
- Anahita, 2010
- Motherless, 2022
