= Final Exam (2017 film) =

The Final Exam
- Directed by: Adel Yaraghi
- Screenplay by: Adel Yaraghi & Abbas Kiarostami
- Produced by: Mostafa Shayesteh
- Starring: Shahab Hosseini
- Cinematography: Hossein Jafarian
- Edited by: Adel Yaraghi
- Distributed by: Nasim-e Saba
- Release date: 2017
- Running time: 90 min
- Country: Iran
- Language: Persian
- Box office: +100,000 USD

The Final exam (Persian: امتحان نهایی, transit. Emtehān Nahāei) is a 2017 Iranian drama film directed by Iranian director Adel Yaraghi and co-written by Yaraghi and the late Iranian acclaimed artist Abbas Kiarostami. It was produced by Iranian producer Mostafa Shayesteh which stars Shahab Hosseini.

The film's primary plot has been written and developed by Kiarostami, although Kiarostami has never lasted to see his work on the screen. Final exam has been released only eight months after Kiarostami's sudden death.

== Plot ==
Farhad (Shahab Hosseini) is a mathematics teacher who goes to one of his teenage pupils' house (Saeed) in order to be his domestic tutor. Consequently, he meets Saeed's mother and falls in love with her. This encounter causes Farhad and the mother's marriage. But soon after the marriage, these two lovers find Saeed in disagreement.

== Cast ==
- Shahab Hosseini as Farhad
- Amir-Hossein Salamati as Saeed
- Leila Zare as Saeed's mother
- Behnam Asgari as Gholaam
- Masoud Naziri as Raha
- Ramana Sayahi
- Bahram Sahihi
- Seyed Ali Mousavi Nour
- Ghobad Shapoori
- Elham Akbari
