= Final Exam: A Surgeon's Reflections on Mortality =

2007 book by Pauline Chen

- First edition
- Author: Pauline Chen
- Subject: End-of-life care, US medical education, mortality
- Publisher: Knopf
- Publication date: January 9, 2007
- Pages: 288 pp
- ISBN: 0-307-26353-3

Final Exam: A Surgeon's Reflections on Mortality is a 2007 book written by surgeon and liver specialist Pauline Chen. The Los Angeles Times described the main goal of the book as "to hold herself and fellow physicians accountable for providing better end-of-life care." She argues that "medical schools can and should do a much better job of preparing doctors to care for the dying."
