= Jam-e-Jam Television Festival =

Annual festival for TV programs in Iran

Jam-e-Jam Television Festival is an annual festival for TV programs in Iran. It is annually organized by Islamic Republic of Iran Broadcasting to honor its top TV programs and films. The first festival was held in 2011.
