= Tahmineh Milani =

Iranian film director and producer

Tahmineh Milāni
- تهمینه میلانی
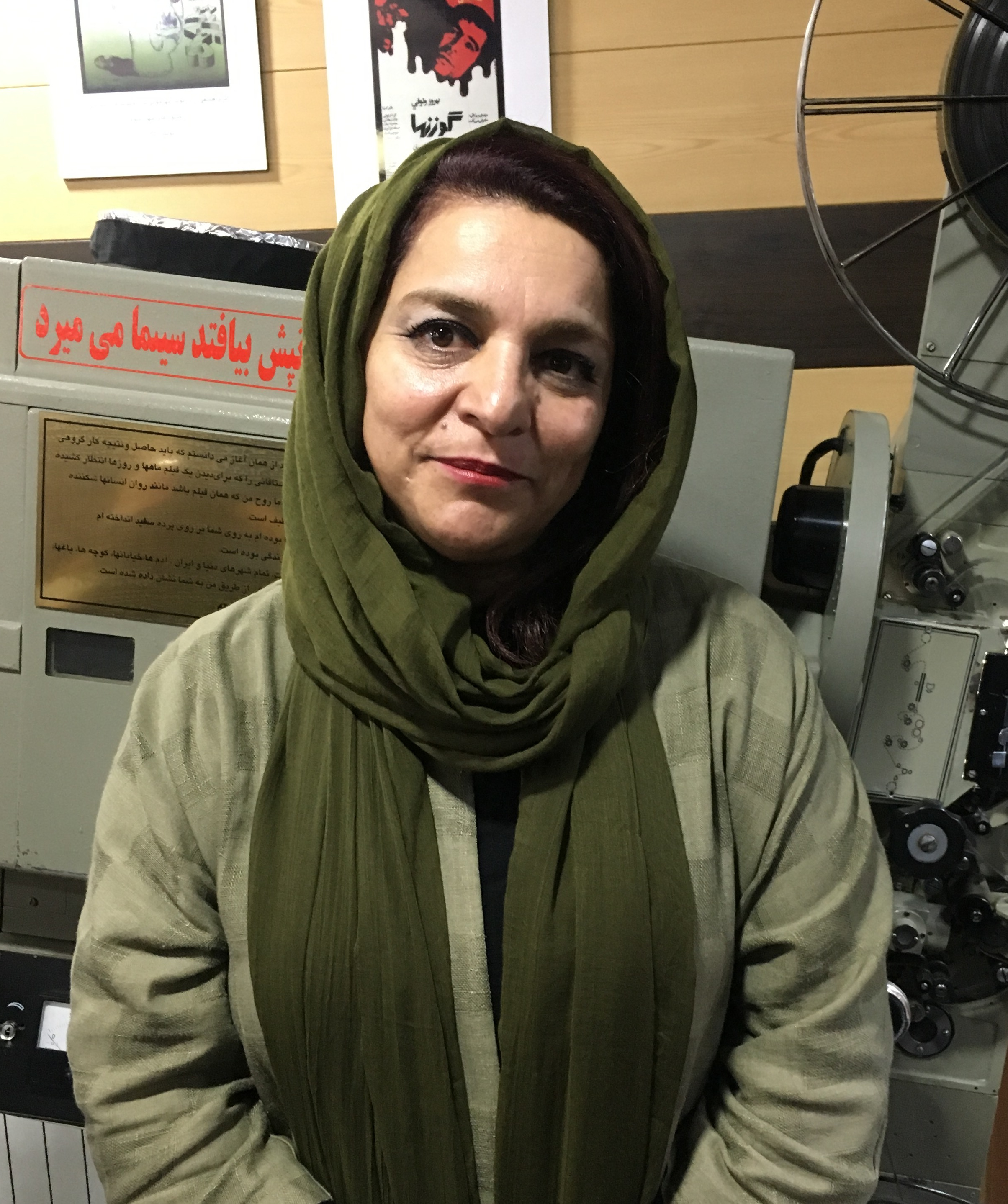
- Tehmineh Milani in 2017
- Born: 6 September 1960 (age 66); Tabriz, Iran
- Occupations: Film director, producer, screenwriter, architect
- Years active: 1980–present
- Spouse: Mohammad Nikbin
- Relatives: Ahmad Milani (father)

Tahmineh Milāni (Persian: تهمینه میلانی; born 1960) is an Iranian feminist activist, and film director and producer.

== Early career ==
She was born in 1960 in Tabriz, Iran. After graduating in architecture from the University of Science and Technology in Tehran in 1986, she apprenticed as a script girl and an assistant director following a screening workshop in 1979.

== Directing career ==
Milani's directing career has produced award-winning films, such as Two Women, The 5th Reaction, and The Unwanted Woman. Her films often focus on cultural or social issues, including women's rights and the 1979 Iranian Revolution. Milani states that one of the most important issues in Iran is the inability to express one's true personality, claiming that Iranian men and women lead double lives.

Her early films resembled fables, such as her 1990 offering Efsanye-e Ah (The Legend of a Sigh), which featured a character who, after failing as an author, befriends her sigh of despair. The sigh goes on to teach her of women with much larger problems in the world, yet remain happy. Two years later, in Dige Che Khabar (What Did You Do Again?), Milani told the story of a young girl with the power to change her family simply by talking to herself. Iranian censors fought against the film, instructing her to replace the female lead with a young boy. Hard-line conservatives accused Milani of encouraging women to revolt against the current system. She deflected the criticisms, insisting that the men were merely scared of seeing their wives riot because of her films.

In her later films, Milani adopted a more melodramatic style and focused more on gender issues and her female characters became the subject of intense oppression and discrimination.

The government charged Milani as an anti-revolutionary due to the storyline of her 2001 anti-revolutionary film Nimeh-e Pinhan (The Hidden Half), which revolved around a leftist university student against the regime of Shah Mohammad Rezā Shāh Pahlavi. The film's primary love story also drew criticism for its depiction of the main character's relationship with an older man. Despite receiving permission to produce the film from the reformist Khatami government, she was imprisoned in 2001. A backlash from many world-famous directors including Francis Ford Coppola and Martin Scorsese caused the government to release her after two weeks, but official charges were never dropped.

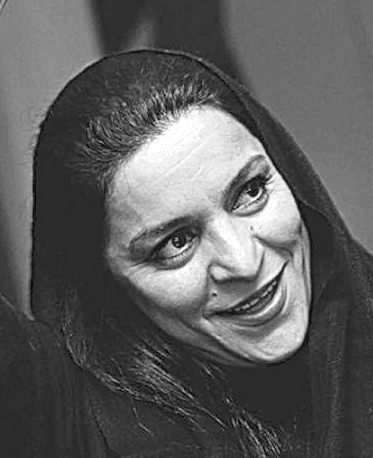
Tahmineh Milani in 2008

Milani's 2005 film Unwanted Woman tells the story of a woman forced to cover up a journey with her friend because of a law banning travel for unmarried couples. Vakonesh Panjom (The Fifth Reaction) is the story of a woman who leaves her wealth, home, and children after the death of her husband. The Fifth Reaction, released in 2003, is Tahmineh Milani's seventh movie regarding women's social position and rights in a patriarchal society. For example, in Vakonesh Panjom (The Fifth Reaction), Milani addresses the problems of sexism, social inequality and injustice, and mainly laws ignoring women's rights in child custody cases, to awaken women and to inspire them to fight for their rights. While often exaggerated for cinema-goers, the films' topics draw clear parallels to life in a theocratic Iran.

In 2007, Milani announced that she was going to make an AIDS-focused TV series for the Islamic Republic of Iran Broadcasting with the title The Positive Pals Club .

Her film Yeki Az Mā Do Nafar (One of Our Two) screened in Iranian halls in 2011. She wrote and directed the film Principles, which was criticized as stilted and preachy.

In 2016, Milani presented an exhibition of photography at the Ariana Gallery in Tehran.

== Accusations of plagiarism ==
In September 2018, following an exhibition of Milani's paintings at an art gallery in Tehran, accusations emerged on social media accusing Milani of plagiarizing Russian illustrator Jenny Meilihove. In response, Milani offered an apology stating: "I'm so sorry and I will withdraw the painting from the showcase and compensate for the loss. The image of a postcard I had received in the past recorded on my unconscious and the result was the painting" and added that all the money raised by the exhibit would go to charity. Additionally, Milani filed a lawsuit against the art gallery over early closure of her exhibition and "against those people who brought chaos to the exhibition".

In 2019, while organizing an exhibition of her paintings at Ariana Gallery, a major art center in Tehran, Miliani was again accused of plagiarizing four different artists, including Matteo Arfanotti, Sara Riches, Richard Burlet and Masumeh Mehdizadeh. The Supervisory Council for Gallery Activities issued an official warning to the gallery, and stated "Ariana Gallery has not properly observed professional regulations in ascertaining the authenticity and quality of the artworks". The council remarked that an investigation into the accusations of plagiarism will proceed if a lawsuit is filed against Milani. In response, Milani published a post on her Instagram stating "In this way, I draw inspiration from everything and everyone."

In June 2019, Mahyar Bahram Asl, an Iranian graduate student and painter, was sentenced to 35 lashings under the charge of insulting Milani by accusing her of plagiarism.

== Personal life ==
She is married to Iranian actor and producer Mohammad Nikbin.

On 3 February 2026, Milani was among several figures in the Iranian film industry who signed a statement supporting the 2025–2026 Iranian protests and condemning the government's response to them.

== Filmography ==
Year	Title	Role	Notes
2018	Mali va Rāh-hā-ye Narafte-ash (Untaken Paths)	Director	
2011	Yeki az Mā Do Nafar (One of Our Two)	Director	
2008	Superstar	Director	
2007	Tasviye Hesāb (Settling Scores)	Director	
2006	Cease Fire (Ātash-Bas)	Director	
2005	The Unwanted Woman (Zan-e Ziyādi)	Director	
2003	Vākonesh-e Panjom (The Fifth Reaction)	Director	
2001	Nimeh-ye Penhān (The Hidden Half)	Director	
1999	Do Zan (Two Women)	Director	
1996	Kākādu	Director	
1992	Dige che Khabar? (What Else Is New?)	Director	
1991	Afsāneh-ye Āh (The Legend of Sigh)	Director	
1989	Bachche-hā-ye Talāgh (Children of Divorce)	Director	

== Awards and nominations ==
Year	Award	Category	Work	Result	Notes
2006	Asia Pacific Film Festival	Best Screenplay	The Unwanted Woman	Won	
2006	Asia Pacific Film Festival	Best Film	The Unwanted Woman	Won	
2006	Asia Pacific Film Festival	Best Director	The Unwanted Woman	Won	
2005	Los Angeles Film Festival	Best Film	The Unwanted Woman	Won	
2003	Geneva Cinéma Tout Ecran	Grand Prix 'Cinéma Tout Ecran'	The Fifth Reaction	Won	
2003	Cairo International Film Festival	Best Screenplay	The Fifth Reaction	Won	
2001	Cairo International Film Festival	Best Artistic Contribution	The Hidden Half	Won	
1999	Iran's Fajr International Film Festival	Best Screenplay	Two Women	Won	

== See also ==
- Iranian women's movement
- Iranian women
- Iranian cinema
