= Mohammad Hadi Karimi =

Iranian director

- محمدهادی کریمی
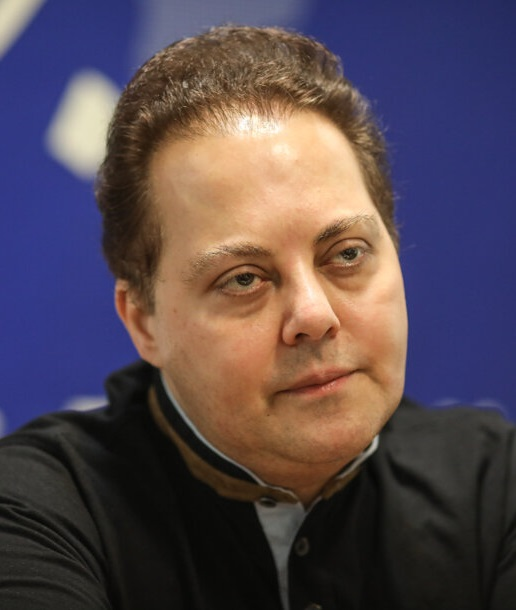
- Born: September 6, 1974 (age 51); Tehran, Iran
- Occupations: Film director, screenwriter, producer, physician, Poet

Mohammad Hadi Karimi (Persian: محمدهادی کریمی; born September 6, 1974, Tehran), is an Iranian film director and screenwriter.

== Filmography ==
Year	Film	Credited as		
Year	Film	Writer	Director	Producer
2020	Filicide	Yes	Yes	Yes
2017	Human Comedy	Yes	Yes	Yes
2015	Iran Burger	Yes	No	No
2014	Resident of the middle floor	Yes	No	No
2013	Annunciation to a Third Millennium Citizen	Yes	Yes	No
2011	Snow on a Hot Tin Roof	Yes	Yes	No
2010	The Killer	Yes	No	No
2008	Emshab Shabe Mahtabe	Yes	Yes	No
2008	The Cast Back	Yes	No	No
2005	Gheyr-e Montazereh	Yes	Yes	No
2005	Rastegari dar 8:20	Yes	No	No
2004	A Candle in the Wind	Yes	No	No
2003	The Ziggurat Goddess	Yes	No	No
2003	Cheshman siah	Yes	No	No
2002	Rokhsareh	Yes	No	No
2001	Otanazi	Yes	No	No
2000	Fame	Yes	No	No
2001	Maral	Yes	No	No
1999	Wating Girls	Yes	No	No
1998	Sib-e sorkh-e Hava	Yes	No	No
1997	Saghar	Yes	No	No
