= Ghasem Jafari =

Iranian film director and screenwriter (b. 1969)

- Born: 6 July 1969 (age 57); Mahallat, Imperial State of Iran
- Occupations: Film director, producer, screenwriter
- Years active: 1995–present

Ghasem Jafari (Persian: قاسم جعفری; born 6 July 1969) is an Iranian director, writer, and film and television producer, based in Tehran, Iran.

== Biography ==
His wife, Sedigheh Sehat, is a film and television producer. He has two children, Iran and Shahrzad, who are both artists.

He is a graduate of the Film Education Training Center and began his career in cinema in 1990 as the director of production of the film Disarmament and in the slaughterhouse of love as the deputy director of production.

== Works ==
=== Publications/Writings ===
- Ghasem, Jafari; Mohammadamin, Ghaneeirad; Mozhgan, Khoshnam (2015). "National Pride, Democracy, Importance of Religion and the increase in the level of Happiness In World Values Surveys (2005-2009)". Sociological Review. 22 (1): 131–163. doi:10.22059/JSR.2015.56317.

=== Serial Films ===
- Cold Fever (TV series)
- My flower series
- Serial Kashaneh
- The third way series
- Serial Companion
- Red Line Series
- Sunny Night series
- Traveler from India
- Serial help me
- The Strange Serial
- The series is out of breath
- Life is a beautiful series

=== Movies ===
- Ein Shin Qaf (2014)
- Parvangi (2011)
- Girls (2009)
- White and Black (2009)
- Majnoon Lily (2007)
- Corner of the heart
- Twilight (2006)
- The Loser (2004)
- Dandelion (1995)
- Mehraban Month (1995)
