= Gildokht =

2022 series

- Persian: گیلدخت
- Genre: History, Romance
- Directed by: Majid Esmaeili
- Starring: Mahmoud Pak Niat; Saeed Rad; Mitra Rafee; Soraya Qasemi; Saeed Changizian; Shaghayegh Farahani; Parivash Nazarieh; FakhreddinSeddighSharif mohammad ranjbar Reza Akbarpor; Ramtin Khodapanahi
- Country of origin: Iran
- Original language: Persian
- No. of seasons: 1
- No. of episodes: 60

Production
- Running time: 45 minutes

Original release
- Release: 7 November 2022

Gildokht (Persian: گیلدخت) is an Iranian historical television series directed by Majid Esmaeili which depicts one of the important historical events of the reign of Mozaffar ad-Din Shah Qajar.

== Storyline ==
Golnar and Ismail are two young adults from the north of Iran who fall in love during the reign of Mozaffar ad-Din Shah Qajar. Taghi Khan, Golnar's father, who is the governor of the province, prevents them from being together. Eventually, they manage to force Taqi Khan to give them an important letter. Golnar, who escapes from there on the day her father's mansion fell, is later forced to return to the mansion under a pseudonym. Taqi Khan, who was one of the most important people in the court, is imprisoned at the end of his life by Tavus Al-Muluk and Asif Mirza, ultimately losing both his freedom and his wife.

== Cast ==
The cast includes:

- Mahmoud Pak Niat
- Saeed Rad
- Saeed Changizian
- Soraya Qasemi
- Shaghayegh Farahani
- Mitra Rafee
- Reza Akbarpor
- Parivash Nazarieh
- Fakhreddin Seddigh Sharif
- Ramtin Khodapanahi
- Amin Miri
- Yousef Safari Bakhtiari
- mohammad ranjbar
- Nafiseh Roshan
