= Douch =

Douch may refer to:

== People ==
- Jonny Douch, English bass guitarist in band Clement Marfo & The Frontline
- Kevin Douch, English founder of independent record labels Alcopop! Records and Big Scary Monsters Recording Company
- Nick Douch, New Zealand drummer in band Ekko Park
- Stuart Douch, English headmaster of Sompting Abbotts Preparatory School

== Other ==
- Douch (film), a 2018 film directed by Amir Mashhadi Abbas

== See also ==
- Douche
