= Mohsen Chavoshi =

Kurdish-Iranian musical artist (born 1979)

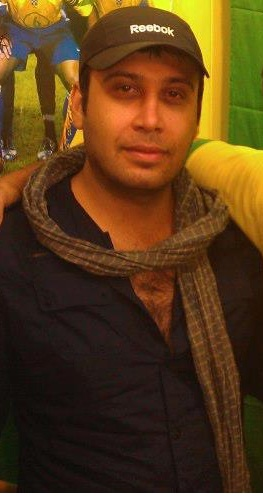
- Born: Mohsen Chavoshi Hosseini; 29 July 1979 (age 47); Khoramshahr, Khuzestan, Iran
- Occupations: Singer; songwriter; composer; arranger
- Musical career
- Genres: Persian Pop; rockpop rock; electronic; trance; Persian blues; dubstep
- Instruments: Vocals; piano; keyboard
- Years active: 2002–present
- Labels: Avaye Farvahar; Taraneh Sharghi

Mohsen Chavoshi Hosseini (Persian: محسن چاوشی حسینی; born 30 July 1979) is an Iranian musician, singer, record producer and songwriter, based in Tehran. He has released ten albums, including a soundtrack to the 2007 film Santouri.

== Early life ==
Chavoshi was born in Khorramshahr, Khuzestan Province to a Kurdish family from Kurdistan Province. His family migrated to Mashhad, Razavi Khorasan Province, where he also completed his education.

== Career ==
Chavoshi began his music career after he finished school and military service. His 2008 album Ye Shakhe Niloufar (a lotus sprout) received permission to be released legally. The CD became the biggest legally sold in Iran by selling over one million legal non-bootleg copies. In Yek Shakheh Niloofar, alongside his new producer, Chavoshi experimented with a new style that was more towards the rock music genre while including traditional Persian instruments. In 2010, Chavoshi made his new album Jakat (Jacket), which had many more up-tone, passionate melodies and lyrics. The album started with an upbeat melody in the style of "Bandari" with southern Iranian dialect, which caused a small shock to his listeners.

Chavoshi produced most of the songs on the album, while the professional producer Shahab Akbari produced two and Ahari produced three.

He released Greedy (his seventh album) in 2011. In 2012 Parcham-e Sefid (White Flag) was released by TDH Company as the fourth album of his career under the law. Also in 2012, Again Del Seda, the fourth Mohsen Chavoshi group album, was released by Besharat Company which contained one track of Mohsen, and it became a hit track. He released Man Khod An Sizdaham ('I Am The Thirteen') in 2013. Chavoshi released Paroye Bi Ghayegh ('Boatless Oar') in October 2014 and broke album sales records in Iran at 1393.

Mohsen Chavoshi is also known as the Special Music Man in Iran.

== Personal life ==
Chavoshi has three brothers and two sisters. He was married in March 2009 and has a son named Zankow.

== Discography ==
Albums	Curse (Unofficial, Released: 2004)			
No.	Title	Native	English Translation	Lyrics
01	Nefrin	نفرين	Curse	Maryam Heydarzadeh
02	Kaftare Chahi	كفتر چاهي	Well Pigeon	Hossein Safa
03	Faseleh	فاصله	Distance	Mohsen Chavoshi
04	Marg	مرگ	Death	Hamid Mosaddegh
05	Leili o Majnoon	ليلي و مجنون	Layla and Majnun	Mozhgan Abbasi
06	Rahe Doshvar	راه دشوار	The Hard Way	Maryam Heydarzadeh
07	Mosafer	مسافر	Traveler	Setare Kazemi
08	Gharibe Madar	غريب مادر	Mother's Oppressed	Maryam Heydarzadeh
Suicide is Forbidden (Unofficial, Released: 2005)
No.	Title	Native	English Translation	Lyrics
01	Khod Koshi Mamnoo	خودكشي ممنوع	Suicide is Forbidden	Bahaare Mokarram
02	Ahay Khabar Nadari	آهاي خبر نداري	Hey! Don't You Know	Mohsen Yeganeh
03	Imam Reza	امام رضا	Imam Reza	Amir Arjeini
04	Hasrate Khis	حسرت خيس	Soaked Regret	Mohsen Chavoshi
05	Kalaf	كلاف	Skein Bewildered	Hossein Safa
06	Saboori	صبوري	Patience	Amir Arjeini
07	To o Fasele	تو و فاصله	You & Distance	Amir Arjeini
08	Banooye Man	بانوي من	My Lady	Amir Arjeini
09	Khashkhash	خشخاش	Poppy	Mohsen Chavoshi
10	Remix	رميكس	Remix	Various
A Shoe Bale (Unofficial, Released: 2006)
No.	Title	Native	English Translation	Lyrics
01	Lenge Kafsh	لنگه كفش	A Shoe Bale	Hossein Safa
02	Bache haye Ahvaz	بچه هاي اهواز	The Kids In Ahvaz	Hossein Safa
03	Tonge Boloori	تنگ بلوري	Crystalline Ewer	Amir Arjeini
04	Eshghe 2 Harfi	عشق دوحرفي	The Two-letter Love	Amir Arjeini
05	Khaterehaye Mordeh	خاطره هاي مرده	The Dead Memories	Hossein Safa
06	Shadabi	شادابی	Succulence	Hossein Safa
07	Gisoo Tala	گيسو طلا	Golden Chignon	Hossein Safa
I'm Sorry (Unofficial, Released: 2006)
No.	Title	Native	English Translation	Lyrics
01	Aroose Man	عروس من	My Bride	Hossein Safa
02	Nafas Borideh	نفس بريده	Gasp	Mohsen Chavoshi
03	Abraye Paeizi	ابراي پاييزي	Autumnal Clouds	Amir Arjeini
04	Khianat	خيانت	Treason	Bahaare Mokarram
05	Kam Tahamol	كم تحمل	Little Tolerance	Hossein Safa
06	Moteasefam	متاسفم	I'm Sorry	Hossein Safa
07	Gole Sar	گل سر	Hair Flower	Yaha Kashani
08	Parandeh	پرنده	The Bird	Amir Arjeini
09	Felestin	فلسطين	Palestine	Amir Arjeini
A Lotus Sprout (Official, Released: 2008)
No.	Title	Native	English Translation	Lyrics
01	Ye Shakhe Niloofar	يه شاخه نيلوفر	A Lotus Sprout	Hossein Safa
02	Kojas Begoo ?	كجاس بگو ؟	Where Is She? Tell me!	Hossein Safa
03	Tabrik	تبريك	Congratulations	Amir Arjeini
04	Chera?	چرا؟	Why?	Amir Arjeini
05	Gholeye Khoshbakhti	قله خوشبختي	Peak Of Luck	Hossein Safa
06	Hafte haye Talkhe Man	هفته هاي تلخ من	My Bitter Weeks	Mohsen Chavoshi
07	Khakestar	خاكستر	Ash	Hossein Safa
08	Naz	ناز	Charm	Amir Arjeini
09	To Ke Nisti	تو كه نيستي	When You Are Not Here	Eslam Vali Mohammadi
10	Deltangi	دلتنگي	Nostalgia	Amir Arjeini
11	Boghz	بغض	Sob	Hossein Safa
12	Assa	عصا	Cane	Hossein Safa
Jacket (Official, Released: 2009)
No.	Title	Native	English Translation	Lyrics
01	Bazare Khoramshahr	بازار خرمشهر	Khoramshahr Bazaar	Ali Mehregan
02	Char Divari	چار ديواري	Enclosure	Amir Arjeini
03	Asiri	اسيري	Slavery	Amir Arjeini
04	Dore Akhar	دور آخر	The Last Round	Hossein Safa
05	Haraj	حراج	Sale	Amir Arjeini
06	Khande	خنده	Laugh	Hossein Safa
07	Ki Behet Khandide	كي بهت خنديده ؟	Who Made Fun Of You	Mohsen Chavoshi
08	Lolaye Shekasteh	لولاي شكسته	The Broken Hinge	Keikavoos Yakide
09	Bekhoon Emshab	بخون امشب	Sing Tonight	Hossein Safa
10	Delshooreh	دلشوره	Anxiety	Amir Arjeini
11	Daryacheye Mordeh	درياچه مرده	The Dead Lake	Amir Arjeini
12	Jhakat	ژاكت	Jacket	Mohsen Chavoshi
Greedy (Official, Released: 2010)
No.	Title	Native	English Translation	Lyrics
01	Chamedoon	چمدون	Suitcase	Amir Arjeini
02	Parvaneha	پروانه ها	The Butterflies	Hossein Safa
03	Gheire Mamooli	غير معمولي	Unordinary	Ali Bahreini
04	Boofe Koor	بوف كور	The Blind Owl	Amir Arjeini
05	Ghamo Shadi	غم و شادي	Cheer & Sorrow	Amir Arjeini
06	Haris	حريص	Greedy	Amir Arjeini
07	Parandeye Ghamgin	پرنده غمگين	The Sad Bird	Hossein Safa
08	Zibaie	زيبايي	You Are Beautiful	Amir Arjeini
09	Bad Badakaye Rangi	باد بادكاي رنگي	The Coloured Kites	Amir Arjeini
10	Kafe haye Sholoogh	كافه هاي شلوغ	Crowded Cafe's	Hossein Safa
11	Delam Tanhas	دلم تنهاس	My Heart Is Lonely	Amir Arjeini
White flag (Official, Released: 2012)
No.	Title	Native	English Translation	Lyrics
01	Mardom Azar	مردم آزار	People Tormenting	Hossein Safa
02	Javabam Nakon	جوابم نكن	Do Not Reject Me	Hossein Safa
03	Khane Haftsad	خوان هفتصد	Seven Hundredth Round	Eslam Vali Mohammadi
04	Ba Man Bemoon	با من بمون	Stay With Me	Hossein Safa
05	Khabe Bad Az Zohr	خواب بعد از ظهر	The Afternoon Nap	Hossein Safa
06	Begoo Magoo	بگو مگو	Argument	Hossein Safa
07	Ghatar	قطار	Train	Hossein Safa
08	Parchame Sefid	پرچم سفيد	White Flag	Hossein Safa
09	Taghas	تقاص	Vengeance	Hossein Safa
10	Har Rooz Paeeze	هر روز پاييزه	Every Day Is Autumn	Hossein Safa
Man Khod An Sizdaham (Official, Released: 2013)
No.	Title	Native	English Translation	Lyrics
01	Ghalat Kardam, Ghalat	غلط کردم غلط	I Was Wrong, Wrong	Vahshi Bafqi
02	Ku Be Ku	کو به کو	Alley by Alley	Rumi
03	Ramidim	رمیدیم	Eloped	Vahshi Bafqi
04	Negaar	نگار	Beloved	Baba Tahir
05	Setamgar	ستمگر	Criminal	Shahriar
06	Shir Marda	شیر مردا	The Brave	Rumi
07	Man Khod Aan Sizdaham	من خود آن سیزدهم	I Myself Am the Thirteen	Shahriar
08	Ghoraze Chin	قراضه چین	Scrap Taker	Rumi
09	Bahram e Goor	بهرام گور	Bahram The Goor	Khayyam
Boatless Oar (Official, Released: 2014)
No.	Title	Native	English Translation	Lyrics
01	Desire	دزیره	Desire	Rozbeh Bemani
02	Ghahve Ghajari	قهوه قجری	Ghajari Coffee	Rozbeh Bemani
03	Joz	جز	But	Hossein Safa
04	Tofange Sar Por	تفنگ سر پر	Loaded Rifle	Hossein Ghiyasi
05	Khab	خواب	Dream	Hossein Safa
06	Parouye Bi Ghayegh	پاروی بی قایق	Boatless Oar	Hossein Safa
07	Ye Khone Kochik	یه خونه کوچیک	A Small House	Hossein Safa
08	Kalanjar	کلنجار	Wrangle	Hossein Safa
09	Yousef	یوسف	Yousef	Hossein Safa
10	Vasiat	وصیت	Will	Hossein Safa
Harmless Ruler (Official, Released: 2016)
No.	Title	Native	English Translation	Lyrics
01	Amire Bi Gazand	امیر بی گزند	Harmless Ruler	Rumi
02	Dele Man	دل من	My Heart	Rumi
03	Changiz	چنگیز	Genghis	Ali Akbar YaghiTabar
04	In Kist In?	این کیست این؟	Who Is This	Rumi
05	Jang Zadeh	جنگ زده	War-Torn	Pedram Parizi
06	Shaydaei	شیدایی	Fascination	Rumi
07	Shah Maghsood	شاه مقصود	Shah Maghsood	Hossein Safa
08	Parishan	پریشان	Bewildered	Saadi
09	Sharmsari	شرمساری	Shame	Hossein Safa
10	Akharin Otoboos	آخرین اتوبوس	The Last Bus	Hossein Safa
11	Teryagh	تریاق	Antidote	Rumi
12	Motesel	متصل	Connected	Rumi
Abraham (Official, Released: 2018)
No.	Title	Native	English Translation	Lyrics
01	Bebor Be Name Khodavandat...	...ببر به نام خداوندت	Slit in the Name of Your God...	Hossein Safa
02	To Dar Masafate Barani...^{†}	...تو در مسافت بارانی	You're in the Distance of the Rain...	Hossein Safa
03	Dar Astaneye Piri...	...در آستانه پیری	On the Verge of Aging...	Hossein Safa
04	Hamrahe Khak Arreh...	...همراه خاک اره	Along With the Saw Dust...	Hossein Safa
05	Lotfan Be Bande Avale Sababeat Begoo...	...لطفا به بند اول سبابه ات بگو	Please Tell the First Knuckle of Your Forefinger...	Hossein Safa
06	Ey Mahe Mehr...	...ای ماه مهر	Hey Month of Mehr...	Hossein Safa
07	Ma Bozorgo Naadanim...^{†}	...ما بزرگ و نادانیم	We Are Big and Fools...	Hossein Safa
08	Jahane Fasede Mardom Ra...	...جهان فاسد مردم را	On Today's People's Corrupt World...	Hossein Safa
No Name (Official, Released: 2019)
No.	Title	Native	-	Lyrics
01	Ghande Mani	قند منی	-	Rumi
02	Ghonjeshke Parideh	گنجشک پریده	-	Saadi
03	Bare Soltan	بر سلطان	-	Rumi
04	Chang	چنگ	-	فصیح‌الزمان شیرازی
05	Ghomar Baz	قمارباز	-	Rumi
06	Aghlo Kherad	عقل و خرد	-	Rumi
07	Zahed	زاهد	-	Rumi
08	Baz Amadam	باز آمدم	-	Rumi
09	Man Nadanestam	من ندانستم	-	Saadi - Vahshi Bafqi
10	Ghome Be Haj Rafte	قوج به حج رفته	-	Rumi
11	Raaz	راز	-	Saadi

^{†}: The songs that failed to get permission from Ershad, which are included as bonus tracks in the VIP Edition of Abraham and released for free on digital music stores (later removed) and are circulated over the internet.

=== Albums ===
- 2019: no name 20.01'2020
- 2018: Ebrahim (Abraham)
- 2016: Amire Bi Gazand (Harmless Ruler)
- 2014: Parouye Bi Ghayegh (Boatless Oar)
- 2013: Man Khod An Sizdaham (I Myself Am The Thirteen)
- 2012: Parcham-e Sefid (White Flag) (Released By TGP Company)
- 2012: Del Seda (Sound of Heart) (The fourth Mohsen Chavoshi's group album, released By Besharat Company)
- 2011: Santouri(Released By Irangaam Company)
- 2011: Khas (The 3rd Mohsen Chavoshi's group album released By Avaye Farvahar Company)
- 2011: Haris (Greedy) (Released By TDH Company)
- 2010: Hasht (8) (The 2nd Mohsen Chavoshi's group album released by Honar Namaye Parsian Company)
- 2010: Zhakat (Jacket) (Released By Iran Gaam Company)
- 2009: Salam Agha (Hi, O'sir) (The First Mohsen Chavoshi's group album released By TDH Company)
- 2009: Ye Shakhe Niloufar (A Lotus Sprout) (The First Official Album Of Mohsen Chavoshi that released By Avaye Barbad Company)
- 2006: Moto'asefam (I'm Sorry)
- 2005: Lenge Kafsh (A Shoe)
- 2005: Khodkoshi Mamnou (Suicide Is Forbidden)
- 2004: Nefrin (Curse)

=== Singles ===
- 01: Kashki
- 02: Khod Faribi
- 03: Rafighe Khoob
- 04: Tohmat
- 05: Shere Sepid
- 06: Sange Sabour
- 07: Haa
- 08: Salam Be Solh
- 09: Nakhlaye Bi Sar [2011]
- 10: Zakhme Zaboon(live)
- 11: Divare Bi Dar [2011]
- 12: Deltang [2011]
- 13: Lebase No [2012]
- 14: Maame Vatan [2012]
- 15: Metro [2012]
- 16: Mahi Siah Kochouloo(for Azerbayjan quake) [2012]
- 17: Vase Aberooye Mardomet Bejang (ft. Farzad Farzin) [2013]
- 18: Khalije Irani/Iranian Gulf (ft. Sina Hejazi) [2013]
- 19: Dooset Dashtam (I loved you)[2013]
- 20: Hamsayeh (Neighbor) [2013]
- 21: Beraghsa [2014]
- 22: Cheshmeye Toosi [2014]
- 23: In bood Zendegi (Lyrics By Hossein Panahi) [2014]
- 24: Maadar [2015]
- 25: Mina (folk) [2015]
- 24: Bide Bi Majnon [2015]
- 25: Hamkhaab [2015] (Shahrzad soundtrack)
- 26: Be Rasme Yadegar [2015] (Shahrzad soundtrack)
- 27: Kojai [2015] (Shahrzad soundtrack)
- 28: Shahrzad [2015] (Shahrzad soundtrack)
- 29: Afsaar [2016] (Shahrzad soundtrack)
- 30: Ghalash [2016]
- 31: Mah Pishooni [2016] (Shahrzad soundtrack)
- 32: Khodahafezi Talkh [2016] (Shahrzad soundtrack)
- 33: Divoone [2016] (Shahrzad soundtrack)
- 34: Pesaram
- 35: DelKhoon [2016]
- 36: Zendan (Prison) [2017]
- 37: Goldoon (FlowerPot) [2017]
- 38: Fandake Tab Dar [2017]
- 39: Bist Hear Arezoo (Twenty thousand wishes) [2017]
- 40: Ey Darigha [2017] (Shahrzad soundtrack)
- 41: In Bood Zendegi [2017]
- 42: Havam Pase [2017]
- 43: Kash Nadideh Boodamet [2017]
- 44: Mariz Hali [2017]
- 45: Amoo Zanjir Baf (Lyrics By Hossein Panahi) [2018]
- 46: Jomee [2018]
- 47: Delbar (Lyrics By Nezami) [2018]
- 48: Del Ey Del (Lyrics By Baba Tahir) [2018]
- 49: Khouzestan [2018]
- 50: Seide Jegar Khaste (Lyrics By Rumi) [2018]
- 51: Maslakh (Dubai) [2018]
- 52: Che Shod (Lyrics By Shahriar [2018]
- 53: Maleka (Lyrics By Sanai) [2019]
- 54: Halalam Kon [2019]
- 55: Naavak (Lyrics By Hafez) [2019]
- 56: Joor Chin (Lyrics by Hossein Safa) [2019]
- 57: Shabi Ke Mah Kamel Shod [2019]
- 58: Sharhe Alef
- 59: Ham Gonah (The accomplice)
- 60: Zamire Khodsar [2020]
- 61: Ou [2020]
- 62: Taghe Soraya [2020]
- 63: Shedatte Meydan [2020]
- 64: Ali [2020]
- 65: Hossein [2020]
- 66: Abbas [2020]
- 67: Gandom Goon [2021]
- 68: Sale Bi Bahar [2021]
- 69: Mahi Kenare Rood [2021]
- 70: Asadollah [2021]
- 80: Koja Boodi (Khosoof Series) [2021]
- 81: Babe Delami (Khosoof Series) [2021]
- 82: Adle Movasagh [2022]
- 83: Ghashange Man (Amsterdam Series [2022]
- 84: Postman (Aghrab‌e Ashegh Series) [2022]
- 85: Yede Cheshme To Mioftam (Aghrabe Ashegh Series) [2022]
- 86: Ye Paeeiz [2023]

== Awards ==
- Award for the best soundtrack for Santoori Film from Kera International Filmfestival- 2008
- Award for the best Soundtrack for Santoori Film from Donyaye Tasvir ceremony- 2011
- Award for best Pop music composition, best Album (I myself am the thirteen), best Lyric and best Serie soundtrack from Musicema festival- 2013
- Award for best pop Music from Musicema Festival- 2015
- Barbad Award for the best pop Album for Harmless Ruler from Fajr Music Festival- 2016
- Honoring at the Rumi (Molana) Conference- 2016
- Award for the best pop Album for Harmless Ruler from Musicema Festival- 2017
- Award for Series music for Sayeban from JameJam TV Festival- 2018

== Book ==
Mohsen Chavoshi published his first book of poems called This Monstrosity Love (2020).

== See also ==
- Music of Iran
- Khuzestan Province
- Santouri
