= Invitation (2008 film) =

- Directed by: Ebrahim Hatamikia
- Written by: Ebrahim Hatamikia; Chista Yasrebi
- Produced by: Mohammad Pirhadi
- Starring: Farhad Ghaemian; Mohammad-Reza Foroutan; Mahnaz Afshar; Katayoun Riahi; Merila Zarei; Gohar Kheirandish; Soraya Ghasemi; Reza Babak; Siamak Ansari; Majid Moshiri; Sara Khoeniha; Sahar Jafari Jozani; Anahita Netami; Hoda Naseh; Negar Foroozandeh; Negin Sedaghatgooya; Mohammad-Reza Sharifinia
- Cinematography: Touraj Mansouri
- Edited by: Mehdi Hoseinivand
- Music by: Mohammadreza Aligholi
- Distributed by: Namayeshgaran
- Release date: 2008
- Country: Iran
- Language: Persian
- Box office: 4,260,000,000 IRR

Invitation (Persian: دعوت, romanized: Davat) is a 2008 Iranian drama film directed by Ebrahim Hatamikia, who also co-wrote the screenplay with Chista Yasrebi. It is a poly-layered narrative, with many celebrities in the cast.

== Synopsis ==
Different families face a similar crisis and react according to their specific points of view. It is a Persian drama film about several couples realizing that they are going to have a baby, and each of these couples' lives play out in different episodes through the film.

The film revolves around the theme of abortion and its main message can be interpreted as "a child who is invited to this world should not be aborted" even if it is from a 60 year old, widow or a concubine who likes her job more than her child, or a wandering woman in a city that is distancing herself from her plumper husband. One critic described it as "a movie about abortions in which no abortions happen".

This episode of the film which about two university students Pejman Bazeghi is eliminated after the filming which is considered due to censorship treatments, but Ebrahim Hatamikia considers it as the result of time shortages in the limited boundary for a film.

== Cast and crew ==
- Farhad Ghaemian as Mansur
- Mohammad-Reza Foroutan as Zeynaal
- Mahnaz Afshar as Sheyda Sufi
- Katayoun Riahi as Afsaneh
- Merila Zarei as Bahaar
- Gohar Kheirandish as Seyydeh Khanum
- Soraya Ghasemi
- Reza Babak as Mehdi
- Siamak Ansari as Ali
- Majid Moshiri as Kaveh / Hamid
- Sara Khoeniha
- Sahar Jafarijozani as Sudabeh
- Anahita Netami
- Hoda Naseh
- Negar Foroozandeh
- Negin Sedaghatgooya
- Mohammad-Reza Sharifinia

Production crew includes:

- Sound engineer: Mehran Malakouti
- First director assistant and program planner: Alireza Shams Sharifi
- Script Supervisor: Mina Zarpour
- Photographer: Esmail Hatamikia
- Production manager: Mohammadreza Mansouri
- Special Fx: Abbas Shoghi

== Release and reception ==
Hatamikia chose to release the film before the Fajr International Film Festival and did not enter it into the festival.
