= After the Rain (TV series) =

2000 Iranian television series

- Genre: Historical; Social
- Created by: Saeed Soltani
- Directed by: Saeed Soltani
- Starring: Mahmoud Pak Niat; Katayoun Riahi; Marjan Mohtasham; Shahab Hosseini; Jahangir Almasi; Behzad Farahani; Soraya Ghasemi; Saba Kamali; Jamileh Sheykhi
- Ending theme: Saeed Ansari
- No. of episodes: 37

Production
- Producer: Esmaeel Afifeh
- Production locations: Guilan, Iran

Original release
- Network: IRIB TV3
- Release: 2000 – 2002

After the Rain is an Iranian television series produced for IRIB TV3 created by Saeed Soltani. This series is about a story in early Mohammad Reza Pahlavi era.

== Plot ==
After the Rain narrates the story of serfdom during a particular period in Iran’s history. A couple is killed in an accident, but their children are certain foul play was involved. They try to find out more about their family and discover the reason for their parents’ death by reviewing the diary of their grandmother, Shahrbanou. The story dates back to the early Mohammad Reza Pahlavi era, when in the northern region of Iran, a lord (Ezzat Saalaari) who owns regional lands, has many peasants and serfs who work on them and pay him from their earnings. Contrary to other lords of his time, he has only one wife (Khanoom Bas) who's initially unable to have children. She decides to choose her husband a beautiful peasant girl named Shahrbanou, who is later forced to marry him and have a daughter they name Setareh. The lord, first angry at his wife for doing so, after seeing Shahrbanou, is enticed and decides to marry her. Khanoom Bas' mother believes they are losing their place and value in the lord's house and brainwashes her son (Farrokh, Khanoom Bas' brother) who is rather indifferent to these events into taking action to get rid of Shahrbanou and buy them back their former position and respect. Farrokh usually travels to the city and spends his time smoking, drinking, gambling and losing money. After realizing that the lord, who is a father-figure to him and has raised him doesn't love him anymore, he decides to take action. Together, they try to damage the lord's reputation and disgrace his second wife by having her kidnapped and making people believe she has run away because she doesn't love the lord back. On this path, Farrokh slowly becomes so cruel that he realizes that even his mother and sister don't love him anymore. Through a series of events, he ends up choking his sick mother in bed, killing the lord and scaring the peasants away from the house, where he ties and burns his pregnant sister by setting all the houses on fire, destroying the legacy of the lord.

== Cast ==
- Mahmoud Pak Niat
- Katayoun Riahi
- Marjan Mohtasham
- Shahab Hosseini
- Jahangir Almasi
- Behzad Farahani
- Soraya Ghasemi
- Saba Kamali
- Jamileh Sheykhi
- Rahim Norouzi
- Kiumars Malek
- Ramin Parchami
