= Misunderstanding of a Dream =

- Persian: تعبیر وارونه یک رؤیا
- Genre: Political; Romance; Action; Mystery
- Written by: Fereydun Jeyrani
- Directed by: Fereydun Jeyrani
- Starring: Amir Jafari; Dariush Arjmand; Pantea Bahram; Farhad Ghaemian; Setareh Hosseini; Soraya Ghasemi; Tigran Khzmalyan
- Composer: Reza Yazdani
- Country of origin: Iran
- Original language: Persian
- No. of episodes: 30

Production
- Producer: Kamal Tabatabaei
- Production locations: Tehran, Iran; Armenia
- Running time: 45 minutes
- Production company: Islamic Republic of Iran Broadcasting

Original release
- Network: IRIB TV1
- Release: July 27 – September 5, 2015

Misunderstanding of a Dream (Persian: تعبیر وارونه یک رؤیا) is an Iranian television series directed by Fereydun Jeyrani and produced for IRIB TV1. It consists of 30 episodes, each 45 minutes long. It also features Armenian and Russian actors.

== Plot ==
The subject of the series the Iranian nuclear project and spy services.

== Cast ==
=== Main ===
- Amir Jafari
- Dariush Arjmand
- Pantea Bahram
- Farhad Ghaemian
- Setareh Hosseini
- Soraya Ghasemi
- Tigran Khzmalyan

=== Supporting ===
- Ghasem Zare
- Elham Korda
- Negar Abedi

== Awards and nominations ==
Year	Award	Category	Recipient	Result
2016	16th Hafez Festival			
2016	16th Hafez Festival	Best Director	Fereydun Jeyrani	Nominated
2016	16th Hafez Festival	Best OST Song	Reza Yazdani	Nominated
2016	16th Hafez Festival	Best Actress	Elham Korda	Nominated
