= Man Khod An Sizdaham =

Studio album by Mohsen Chavoshi
- Released: March 2013
- Recorded: 2008–2013
- Genre: Persian pop
- Length: 39:50
- Label: Tasvir Gostar Pasargad; Avaye Barbad

Mohsen Chavoshi chronology
Parchame Sefid (2012)	Man Khod An Sizdaham (2013)	Parouye Bi Ghayegh (2014)

Man Khod An Sizdaham (English: I Myself Am The Thirteen) is the sixth official studio album by Iranian singer Mohsen Chavoshi.

== Track listing ==
No.	Title	Lyrics	Music	Meaning	Length
1.	"Ghalat Kardam, Ghalat"	Vahshi Bafqi	Amir Jamalfard	I Was Wrong, Wrong	4:28
2.	"Ku Be Ku"	Rumi	Shahab Akbari; Mohsen Chavoshi	Alley by Alley	5:17
3.	"Ramidim"	Vahshi Bafqi	Koushan Haddad	Eloped	3:27
4.	"Negaar"	Baba Tahir	Shahab Akbari	Beloved	4:06
5.	"Setamgar"	Shahriar	Koushan Haddad	Tyrant	5:08
6.	"Shir Marda"	Rumi	Mohsen Chavoshi	The Intrepid One	2:59
7.	"Man Khod An Sizdaham"	Shahriar	Shahab Akbari	I Myself Am The Thirteen	3:26
8.	"Ghoraze Chin" (Feat Hojjat Ashrafzadeh)	Rumi; Hafez (two couplet)	Mohsen Chavoshi	Gold Swarfs	4:33
9.	"Bahram e Goor"	Omar Khayyam	Shahab Akbari; Mohsen Chavoshi	Bahram Gūr	6:18
Total length:					39:50

== See also ==
- Rumi
- Vahshi Bafqi
- Shahriar
