= Mahmoud Pak Niat =

Iranian actor

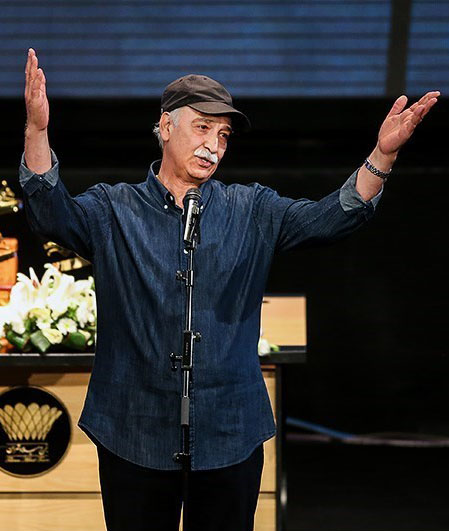
- Pak Niat in 2016
- Born: December 31, 1952 (age 73); Kazerun, Fars, Iran
- Occupation: Actor
- Years active: 1988–present
- Spouse: Mahvash Sabrkon (m. 1979)
- Children: 2

Mahmoud Pak Niat (Persian: محمود پاک‌نیت; born 31 December 1952) is an Iranian actor. He is best known for his acting in Once Upon a Time (1991), Patriarch (1994) After the Rain (2001), Tenth Night (2002), Prophet Joseph (2008–2009) and Shahrzad (2015–2016) television series. He has received various accolades, including nominations for two Crystal Simorgh and a Hafez Award.

== Career ==
Mahmoud Pakniyyat began stage acting in 1969 and in 1988 he stepped into the world of movies and television.

The series which brought him a nationwide fame was Once Upon a Time (1991–1992).

His popularity grew with his appearance in the series The Patriarch (1993–1995) and After the Rain (2000).

Pakniyyat has appeared in the series such as Sheikh Mofid (1995), Seasoned Rider (1997), Lighter than Darkness (1999–2002), The Tenth Night (2001), Prophet Joseph (2008), Building No.85 (2010), Behind the Tall Mountains (2012), The Line (2014), The Recluse (2014), and Warm Breath (2015).

He has also acted in a number of movies, including Death Formation (1994), Land of the Sun (1996), The World Upside-Down (1997), The Wrong Guy (1998), The Victorious Warrior (1998), The Deserted Station (2000–2001), City of Chaos (2005), Heartbroken (2008), and Extreme Cold (2009).

Iranian Ministry of Culture and Islamic Guidance has awarded Iran's High Distinction in Art to Pakniyyat.

== Personal life ==
Mahmoud Pakniat married an actress. They have 2 sons together.

== Filmography ==
=== Film ===
Year	Title	Role	Director	Notes
1997	Land of the Sun		Ahmad Reza Darvish	
1998	The Changed Man		Mohammad Reza Honarmand	
1999	Eve's Red Apple		Saeed Asadi	
2006	Trip to Hidalou		Mojtaba Raie	
2009	Doubt		Varuzh Karim Masihi	
2009	Heartbroken		Ali Rouintan	
2017	Loveulance		Mohsen Mahini	
2019	Watching This Movie Is a Crime		Reza Zahtabchian	
2020	Sheen		Meisam Kazazi	

=== Web ===
Year	Title	Role	Director	Platform
2015–2016	Shahrzad	Jamshid Sa'adat	Hassan Fathi	Lotus Play

=== Television ===
Year	Title	Role	Director	Network	Notes
1991	Once Upon a Time	Hesam Beyg	Amrollah Ahmadjoo	IRIB TV1	TV series
1994	Patriarch	Jalal Vaezian	Akbar Khajavi	IRIB TV2	TV series
2001	After the Rain	Lord Ezzat Salari	Saeed Soltani	IRIB TV3	TV series
2002	Tenth Night	Major Mobarez	Hassan Fathi	IRIB TV1	TV series
2008–2009	Prophet Joseph	Prophet Jacob	Farajollah Salahshoor	IRIB TV1	TV series
2009–2010	In the Eye of the Wind	Jebhe Driver	Masoud Jafari Jozani	IRIB TV1	TV series
2009–2010	Building No.85	Victim's Investigator	Mehdi Fakhimzadeh	IRIB TV2	TV series
2012	Behind the Tall Mountains	Samsha	Amrollah Ahmadjoo	IRIB TV3	TV series
2016	Paria	Hossein Ranjbar	Hossein Soheilizadeh	IRIB TV3	TV series
2016	Special Patrol	The Commander	Mehdi Rahmani	IRIB TV1	TV series
2022	Yellow Tape 2		Soroush Mohammadzadeh	IRIB TV2	TV series
2022–2023	Gildokht	Taghi Khan	Majid Esmaeili	IFilm	TV series
TBA	Sarbaroon Celebration		Mojtaba Raie	IRIB TV1	TV series
