= Louisa Shafia =

Iranian-American chef and cookbook author

- Born: 1969 or 1970 (age 56–57)
- Occupations: Chef, cookbook author
- Writing career
- Notable works: Lucid Food; The New Persian Kitchen
- Website: louisashafia.com

Louisa Shafia (born 1969 or 1970) is an American and Iranian chef and cookbook author. Her 2009 cookbook Lucid Food focuses on local and sustainable eating. The New Persian Kitchen (2013) features traditional Persian dishes as well as reinterpretations.

== Biography ==
=== Early life ===
Shafia was born in 1969 or 1970 to Georgia and Hass Shafia (d. 2023). Shafia's mother, who is Ashkenazi Jewish, grew up in Philadelphia, Pennsylvania, and is president of a Philadelphia-based building maintenance company. Her father was born in a Muslim family in Iran. After graduating from medical school, he emigrated to the United States in 1961 and changed his last name and permanently separated from his family. Shafia attended the Germantown Friends School in Philadelphia and later graduated from the University of Pennsylvania. Before becoming a chef, she sought to become an actress and worked as a writer and editor on the radio talk show Fresh Air.

=== Career ===
Shafia studied at the Natural Gourmet Institute in New York City. After she moved to San Francisco, California, she was employed at Millennium Restaurant, a vegan establishment, and Roxanne's, a raw food restaurant. She moved back to New York, where she cooked under chef Marcus Samuelsson at Restaurant Aquavit and was sous-chef at the newly opened Pure Food and Wine. She began cooking Persian cuisine at her first restaurant job, when she was tasked to create a new entrée and chose to cook fesenjān, an Iranian khoresh (stew) she fondly remembered eating during her childhood.

In 2004, Shafia founded a catering company called Lucid Food. She published a cookbook, also called Lucid Food, in 2009. The cookbook contains recipes that focus on local and sustainable eating. It discusses ways to minimize one's carbon footprint and how to understand terms used on food labels such as "organic" or "free range". Some recipes were inspired by her heritage and her Iranian father's cooking. In March 2010, the cookbook was nominated by the International Association of Culinary Professionals (IACP) as a finalist in the IACP Cookbook Awards in the "Health and Special Diet" category. Interested in writing a cookbook on Persian cuisine, Shafia visited California in 2010 to spend time with Iranian relatives in Los Angeles and explore local restaurants and grocery stores. This culminated in The New Persian Kitchen, published with Ten Speed Press in 2013. The cookbook contains recipes that mix traditional Persian cuisine and contemporary cooking.

Shafia intended to visit Iran to research for The New Persian Kitchen, but her American nationality made securing an Iranian visa a difficult process. After ultimately acquiring Iranian citizenship and a passport in 2013, she took a month-long visit to the country in the spring of 2014. In the autumn, when she returned to the United States, she began operating a weekly Persian street food pop-up in New York City's East Village. The pop-up, named Lakh Lakh, served food based on traditional Persian cuisine and was open until late March 2015, and was praised by Grub Street journalists Rob Patronite and Robin Raisfeld for its "aromatic stews and boldly seasoned rice dishes" which act as a "Persian-tapas gateway into the ancient cuisine". Shafia also designed the original menu for Greenwich Village's Café Nadery (named after the Naderi Café in Tehran, Iran). She has sold Persian culinary ingredients on her online store, Feast by Louisa.

Shafia moved from Brooklyn to Nashville, Tennessee in 2015. After the enactment of the Trump travel ban in 2017, she hosted a Nowruz (Persian New Year) dinner with the Tennessee Immigrant and Refugee Rights Coalition, a local nonprofit, to fundraise for the organization. Shafia said that many of her Iranian relatives were either studying abroad in the United States or in the process of securing visas, green cards, or naturalized citizenship at the time of the travel ban.

== Bibliography ==
- — (2009). Lucid Food: Cooking for an Eco-Conscious Life. Ten Speed Press. ISBN 9781580089647.
- — (2013). The New Persian Kitchen. Ten Speed Press. ISBN 9781607743576.
