= Amir Mashhadi Abbas =

Actor, playwright, Director

- امیر مشهدی عباس
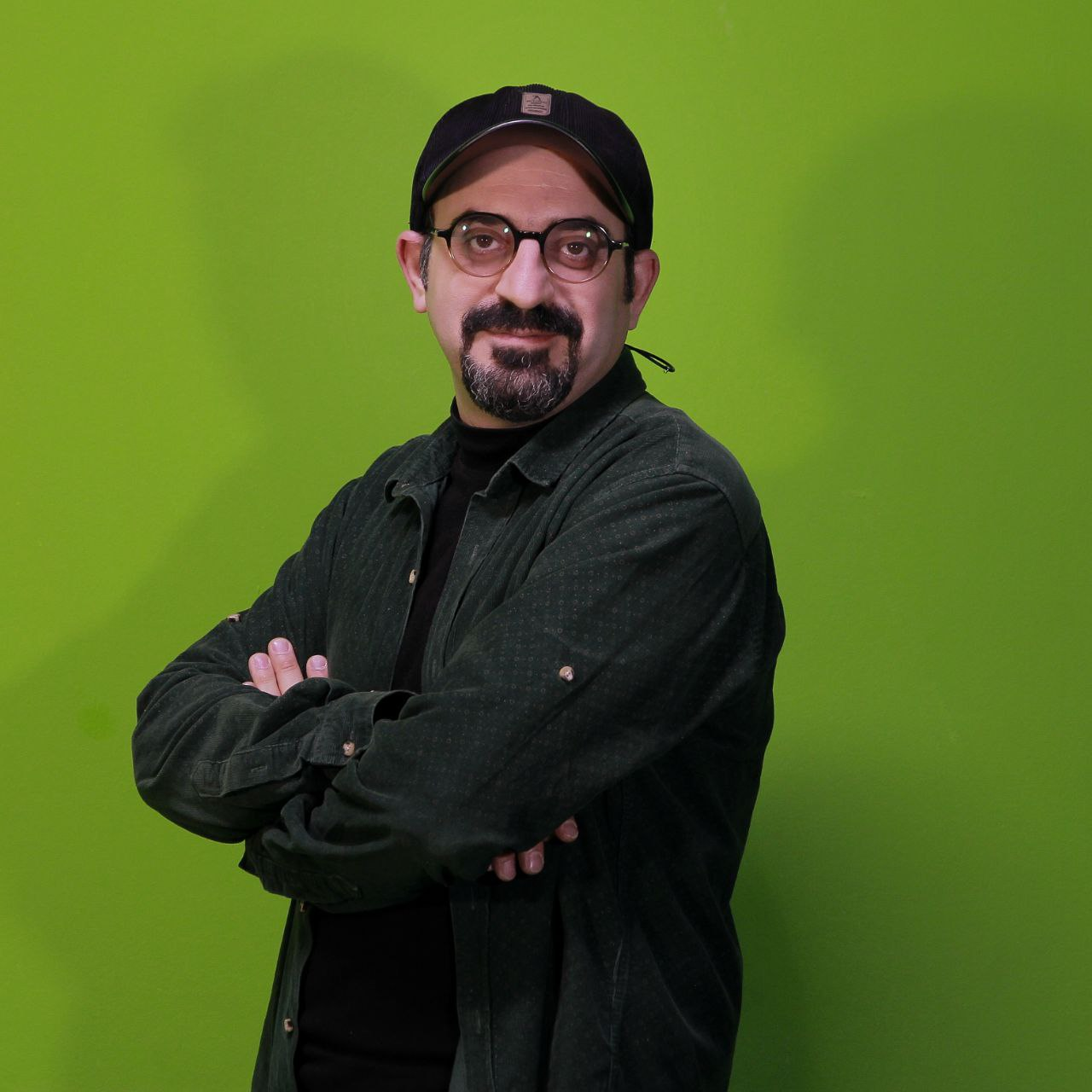
- Born: October 2, 1980 (age 45); Tehran, Iran
- Occupations: Writer; Film director; Playwright
- Years active: 1998–present
- Board member of: International Theatre Festival For Children & Youth

Amir Mashadi Abbas (Persian: امیر مشهدی عباس, born October 2, 1980) is an actor, director, writer, theatre, and cinema playwright from Tehran.

== Cinema ==
In 2018, he made his first film, titled Douch, which won UNICEF special award at the 31st Children and Adolescent Festival of Isfahan.

== Actor ==
Year	Title	Role	Director
2022	The Last Snow	Isa	Amirhossein Asgari
2000	The Miracle Of Marriage		Alireza Khamseh
1998	The Narrative of the Revolution	Navvab Safavi	Javad Shamaqdari, Jamal Shourjeh

== Television ==
Year	Title	Role	Stream
2023	Nim Band	Director	IRIB Nasim
2020	Damahi	Writer & Director	IRIB Persian Gulf
2020	Behtarin Show	Director	IRIB TV2
2017	Out Of The Box	Writer & Director	IFilm
2017	Iranian Art	Writer & Director	Arte

== Theatre ==
Director

- My Strange (2018)
- Dragon, The First Pet (2017)
- Painting (2017)
- Khozeh (2017)
- Generals (2015)
- Ghoolaghoo (2015)
- Be Your Scarecrow (2014)
- Naughty Boy (2013)
- Cookers (2011)
- Mr. Morose (2010)
- Who Will Eat The Mouse (2009)
- Cage Birds (2009)
- Iran Iran (2008)
- Uninvited Guest (2007)
- Votives Food (2007)
- Jamshid Prince (2007)
- Universe Hero (2007)
- Hunter And Bird (2006)
- Miss. Neighbor And Shoemaker (2006)
- You Are My 10th Friend (2005)
- Bald, Bald (2005)
- Contrast (2004)
- Yusuf That Long Moon (2004)
- A Thin Lion (2002)
- Balloon (2001)
- Rain is Rain (2001)
- Lafcadio (2001)
- Lone At Home (2001)
- Rain Is Coming Again (2000)
- Nest (1998)
- Dear Donkey (1996)
- Another Anecdotal (1994)
