= Shahrzad (TV series) =

Iranian TV Series

- Persian: شهرزاد
- Genre: Drama; Romance; Historical; Crime; Mystery
- Written by: Hassan Fathi; Naghmeh Samini
- Directed by: Parsa Ali
- Starring: Shahab Hosseini; Taraneh Alidoosti; Ali Nasirian; Mostafa Zamani; Parinaz Izadyar; Mehdi Soltani; Mahmoud Pak Niat; Abolfazl Poorarab; Jamshid Hashempour; Ghazal Shakeri; Hooman Barghnavard; Reza Kianian; Roya Nonahali; Ateneh Faghih Nasiri; Amir Jafari; Amirhossein Fathi
- Theme music composer: Mohsen Chavoshi
- Composer: Amir Tavassoly
- Country of origin: Iran
- Original language: Persian
- No. of seasons: 3
- No. of episodes: 59

Production
- Producer: Mohammad Emami
- Production locations: Tehran; Isfahan
- Cinematography: Nooshin Jafari
- Editor: Mahdi Hoseinivand
- Running time: 60 minutes

Original release
- Network: Home video
- Release: 12 October 2015 – 11 June 2018

Shahrzad (Persian: شهرزاد, romanized: Shahrzād) is an Iranian romantic and historical drama series written by Hassan Fathi and Naghmeh Samini, produced by Mohammad Emami and directed by Hassan Fathi The storyline is set around and after the 1953 Iranian coup d'état. The series is licensed by the Ministry of Culture and Islamic Guidance of Iran and available online and in CDs around the country. Due to its international popularity, it has been dubbed and aired in Urdu, Arabic, French, Spanish and Russian. It stars Ali Nassirian, Taraneh Alidoosti, Shahab Hosseini, Mostafa Zamani and Parinaz Izadyar.

In the first few episodes, the singer of the series was Alireza Ghorbani. Then Mohsen Chavoshi and Sina Sarlak replaced him. In the last two episodes, Amin Bani and Farnaz Maleki were added to the series' singers.

== Story ==
The story of Shahrzad takes place in 1953. Shahrzad (Taraneh Alidoosti), a medical student, and Farhad (Mostafa Zamani), a literature student, are in love and want to get married. Farhad is arrested for political reasons, and sentenced to death. Shahrzad asks for help from an influential businessman in the government named Bozorg Agha (Ali Nasirian) to save Farhad's life. But Bozorg Agha agrees to help if Shahrzad agrees to his condition. Bozorg Agha has a nephew named Ghobad (Shahab Hosseini) who is married to Bozorg Agha's daughter, Shirin (Parinaz Izadyar). Ghobad and Shirin, who are unable to have children, constantly fight over this issue. Bozorg Agha, who has no son and wants to have an heir for himself, decides to find another wife for Ghobad. Bozorg Agha's condition is that Shahrzad becomes Ghobad's wife and bears him a child. Shahrzad, who only thinks about saving Farhad's life, accepts his condition. As Ghobad marries Shahrzad, Ghobad gradually becomes interested in Shahrzad. Farhad and Ghobad's simultaneous love for Shahrzad affects her life.

== Cast ==
= Main cast (credited)
= Recurring cast (3+)
= Guest cast (1-2)

Actor	Character	Seasons		
Actor	Character	1	2	3
Taraneh Alidoosti	Shahrzad Saadat	Main	Main	Main
Shahab Hosseini	Ghobad Divansalar	Main	Main	Main
Mostafa Zamani	Farhad Damavandi	Main	Main	Main
Parinaz Izadyar	Shirin Divansalar	Main	Main	Main
Ali Nassirian	Bozorg Agha Divansalar	Main		
Mehdi Soltani	Hashem Damavandi	Main	Main	Main
Fariba Motekhasses	Marzieh	Main	Main	Main
Soheyla Razavi	Parvin	Main	Main	Main
Mahmoud Pakniat	Jamshid Saadat	Main		
Gelareh Abbasi	Akram Bourbouran	Main	Main	Main
Houman Barghnavard	Colonel Teymouri	Main	Main	Recurring
Pantea Panahiha	Sharbat	Main	Main	Recurring
Parviz Fallahipour	Nosrat Pashaei	Recurring	Main	Main
Amirhossein Fathi	Homayoun Mohtadi/Saber Abdolli	Recurring	Main	Main
Ghazal Shakeri	Azar Goldarrei	Main		
Abolfazl Pourarab	Heshmat Pashaei	Main		
Amirhossein Rostami	Babak Yeganeh	Main		
Mina Vahid	Maryam Mehrzad	Main		
Nahal Dashti	Mitra Damavandi	Recurring	Recurring	Recurring
Mona Ahmadi & Maasoumeh Beygi	Simin Saadat	Recurring	Recurring	Recurring
Nasim Adabi	Homeyra Saadat	Recurring	Recurring	Recurring
Ramin Naser Nasir	Houshang	Recurring	Recurring	Recurring
Pasha Jamali	Asghari	Recurring	Recurring	Recurring
Jamshid Hashempour	Major Fouladshekan	Recurring		
Roya Nonahali	Belgheys Divansalar		Main	Guest
Reza Kianian	Shapour Behboudi		Main	Main
Amir Jafari	Captain Aparviz		Main	Main
Ateneh Faghih Nasiri	Soraya		Recurring	Recurring
Jamshid Gorgin	Shahram Behboudi	Recurring		
Manouchehr Zendehdel	Colonel Soheili	Recurring		
Hadi Ghomeyshi	Mr. Shirvani	Recurring		
Banipal Shoomoon	Esfandiari	Recurring		
Saghi Zinati	Malmal Taherkhanlou	Recurring		
Mehran Nael	Mr. Arshad	Recurring	Recurring	Recurring
Farshid Samadipour	Zabih	Recurring	Recurring	Recurring
Parviz Bozorgi	Rajab	Recurring	Recurring	Recurring
Mohammad Yeganeh	Asad Ghiasi	Recurring	Recurring	Recurring
Nahid Moslemi	Batool	Recurring	Recurring	Recurring
Sam Nouri	Sedgh Nouri	Recurring	Recurring	Recurring
Abbas Zafari	Akram's father	Recurring	Recurring	Recurring
Parisa Sabournezhad	Saeedeh	Recurring		
Mahsa Nasiri	Esmat	Recurring		
Hamid Reza Azarang	Lieutenant Mohammadi	Guest		
Hossein Saharkhiz	Masoud Khan		Recurring	Recurring
Shokrekhoda Goodarzi	Mozaffar		Recurring	Recurring
Siamak Helmi	Feri		Recurring	Recurring
Parviz Bashardoost	Enayatollah Khan		Recurring	Recurring
Mohsen Naghibian			Recurring	Recurring
Amirkaveh Ahaninjan			Recurring	Recurring
Aman Rahimi			Recurring	Recurring
Mahdi Yahestani			Recurring	Recurring
Morteza Rostami			Recurring	Recurring
Javad Zeytooni			Recurring	Recurring
Farhad Mahdavi			Recurring	Recurring
Mohammadreza Imanian			Recurring	Recurring
Houshang Ghanavatizadeh			Recurring	Recurring
Behzad Davari			Recurring	Recurring
Pouria Miandehi			Recurring	Recurring
Shahab Ashkan			Recurring	Recurring
Hootan Shateripour			Recurring	Recurring
Amirhossein Shariatmadari			Recurring	Recurring
Mohsen Marvi			Recurring	Recurring
Elham Nami			Recurring	Recurring
Ahmad Lashini			Recurring	Recurring

== Production ==
The cast of the 59-episode series includes over 200 artists. Considering the professional team behind the camera, plus two years spent on pre-production and four months of shooting, it is the biggest project by the private sector for the home video network.

=== Location ===
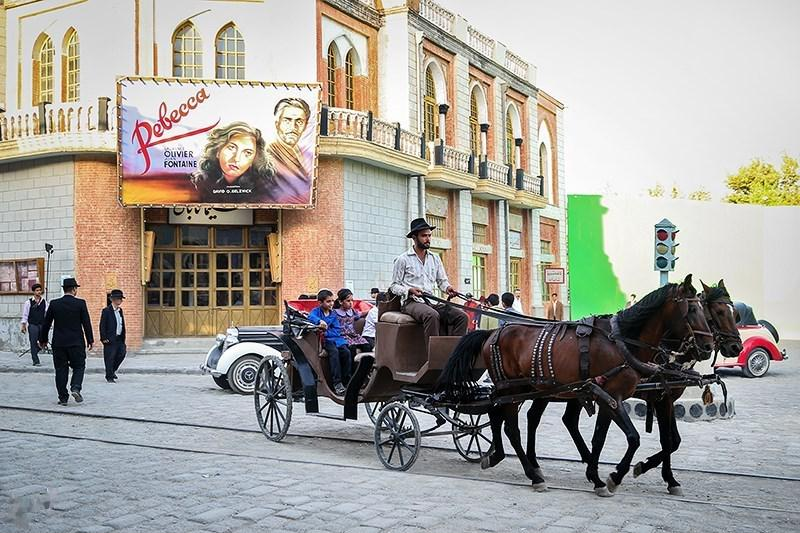

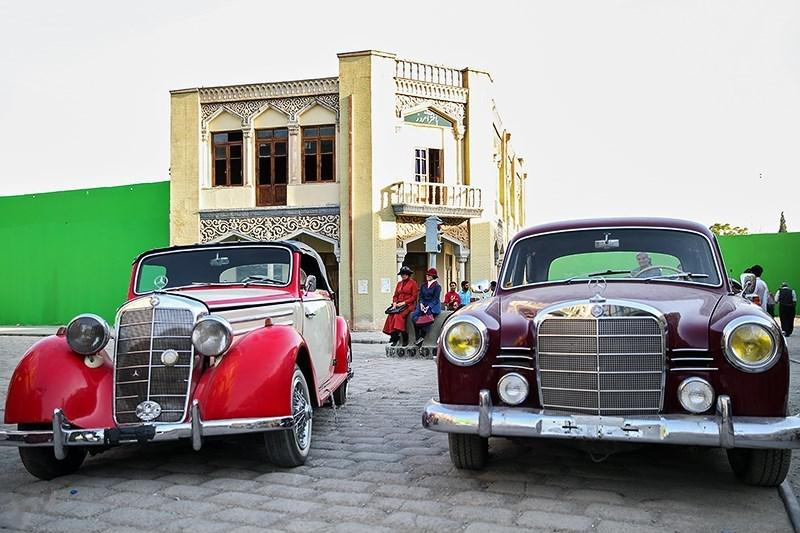

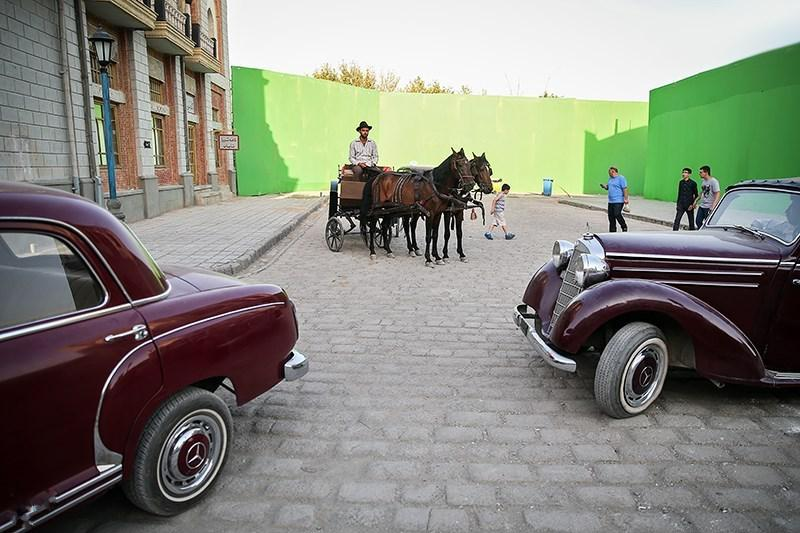

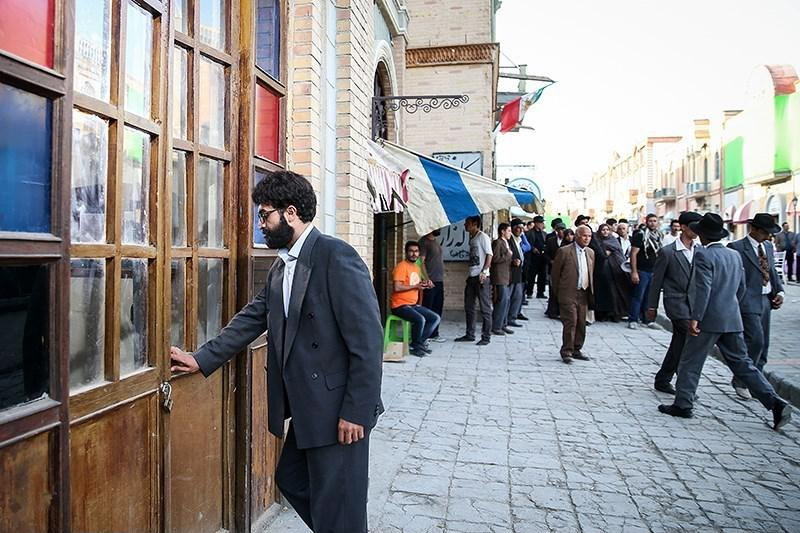

The series was shot in Ghazali Cinematic Town in the western part of Tehran. Covering an area of 10 hectares, the complex was established in 1971 by the late director Ali Hatami, partially simulating old Tehran. It comprises various state and historic buildings; streets, and places similar to more than 100 years ago decorated by Italian decorators, particularly Gianni Cortina. Other locations are the Museum of the Qasr Prison, Vossug ed Dowleh House, House dr Mohammad Moin, Naderi Café, Passenger Terminal, Sulaimaniyah Palace and Baharestan Square camerawork. Another location that resonated with the Armenian community in Iran is the Armenian Club that is used for weddings and outings by the Armenians. This club is used in the very first few parts of episode one of Shahrzad as a meeting place for Farhad and Shahrzad.

Turkish version

A Turkish version of the series was made under the title "Sehrazat" or "Ağlama İstanbul" (Don't Cry Istanbul) was directed by Chagari Villa Lustuvali. The series suffered a sharp decline in viewership after only a few episodes were released.

== Distribution ==
Its first season was broadcast in 2014. The broadcast of the second season started on Monday, June 19, 2017 and ended on October 17, 2017. The broadcast of the third season also began from January 31, 2018 and ended on June 21, 2018. The series was broadcast weekly on Mondays.

== Reception ==
=== Reviews ===
Parviz Jahed review from Guardian wrote:

Good story-telling has made it an intriguing and successful melodrama set against the backdrop of an important episode in Iran’s modern history.

Mahdi Ganjavi review from Global Voices Online wrote:

As the story of Shahrzad shows, the political and economic aspirations, desires, and interests of any historical moment entail a revision of what happened in the past. Shahrzad is a love story in the disturbed atmosphere.

=== Awards ===
This series has had a total of 12 nominations and 7 wins from Hafez Awards and has had 6 nominations and 2 wins from the Yas International Film Festival.

Season 1

Year	Award	Category	Recipient	Result
2016	16th Hafez Awards			
2016	16th Hafez Awards	Best Series	Shahrzad	Won
2016	16th Hafez Awards	Best Director	Hassan Fathi	Won
2016	16th Hafez Awards	Best Soundtrack	Mohsen Chavoshi with Sina Sarlak	Nominated
2016	16th Hafez Awards	Best Actor	Shahab Hosseini	Nominated
2016	16th Hafez Awards	Best Actor	Ali Nasirian	Won
2016	16th Hafez Awards	Best Actress	Taraneh Alidoosti	Nominated
2016	16th Hafez Awards	Best Actress	Parinaz Izadyar	Nominated
2016	16th Hafez Awards	Life Achievement	Jamshid Hashempour	Won

- Also won the Best Director and Best Screenplay category at the fourth Yas International Film Festival.

Season 2 & 3

Was appreciated the most with three awards from Hafez Awards:

- The best drama actor award went to Mehdi Soltani
- The best drama actress to Roya Nonahali
- Best director award to Hassan Fathi.

And eight nominations, including:

- Best Actress for Taraneh Alidosti, Prinaz Izdiar and Galareh Abbasi
- Best Actor for Mostafa Zamani, Shahab Hosseini and Amir Hossein Fathi

=== Poll ===
- Best Series in Iran of all Time with 67% vote - Cmmagazine

=== Celebration and Appreciation ===
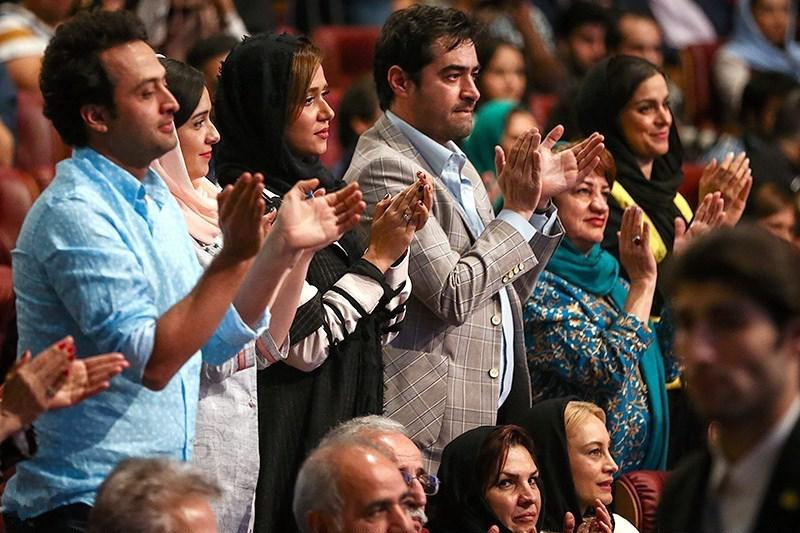

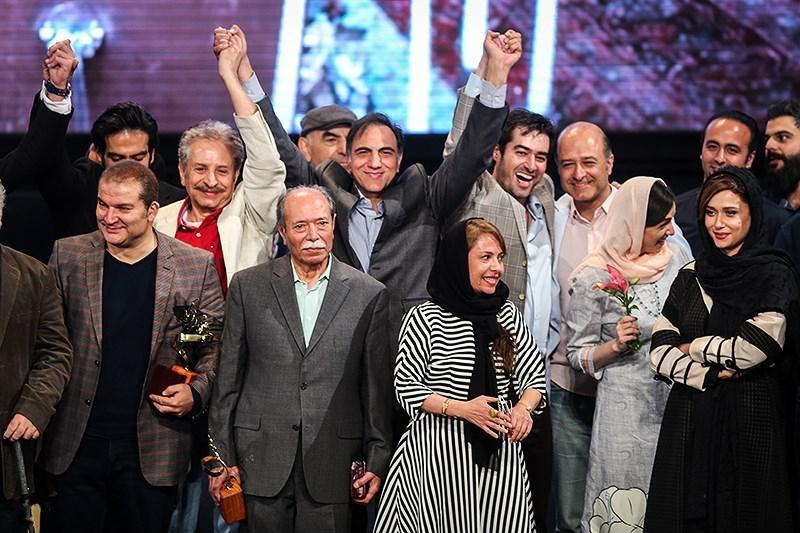

Celebration and appreciation ceremony of the actors of Shahrzad series was held last night, Sunday, May 16, in the presence of the agents of this series and other cinema artists in the conference hall of Milad Tower in Tehran.

== Soundtracks ==
=== Shahrzad OST ===
Track listing
No.	Title	Artist	Length
1.	"Shahrzad"	Alireza Ghorbani	2:50
2.	"Shahrzad 2"	Alireza Ghorbani	3:16
3.	"Hamkhaab"	Mohsen Chavoshi	2:59
4.	"Be Rasme Yadegar"	Mohsen Chavoshi	5:31
5.	"Kojaei?"	Mohsen Chavoshi Ft. Sina Sarlak	3:48
6.	"Shahrzad"	Mohsen Chavoshi	4:11
7.	"Afsar"	Mohsen Chavoshi Ft. Sina Sarlak	4:40
8.	"Mah Pishooni"	Mohsen Chavoshi	3:57
9.	"Barkhiz"	Sina Sarlak	4:51
10.	"Khodahafezie Talkh"	Mohsen Chavoshi	3:58
11.	"Divooneh"	Mohsen Chavoshi
12.	"Fandak Tab dar"	Mohsen Chavoshi Ft. Sina Sarlak	3:37
13.	"Ey Darigha"	Mohsen Chavoshi Ft. Sina Sarlak	4:27
14.	"Havam Dobare pase"	Mohsen Chavoshi	4:25
15.	"Tanha Omide Zendegi"	Sina Sarlak	4:05
16.	"Kash Nadide Boodamet"	Mohsen Chavoshi	5:04
17.	"Jome"	Mohsen Chavoshi	4:36
18.	"Del Ey Del"	Mohsen Chavoshi Ft. Sina Sarlak	5:33
19.	"Che Kardi"	Amin Bani Ft. Farnaz Maleki	4:17
20.	"Nashod"	Amin Bani Ft. Farnaz Maleki	4:58
