= Parviz Poorhosseini =

Iranian actor (1941–2020)

- پرویز پورحسینی
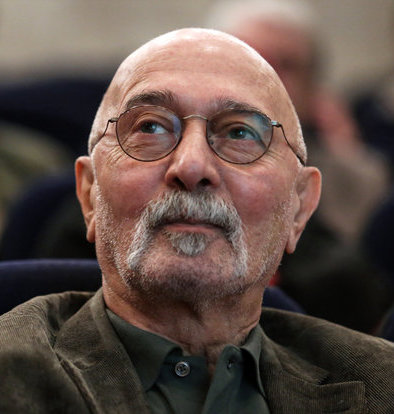
- Born: 11 September 1941; Tehran, Iran
- Died: 27 November 2020 (aged 79); Tehran, Iran
- Occupation: Actor
- Years active: 1970–2020
- Spouse: Nahid Arasbaran
- Children: 1

Parviz Poorhosseini (Persian: پرویز پورحسینی; 11 September 1941 – 27 November 2020) was an Iranian film, theater and television actor.

== Biography ==
He was best known for his roles in Bashu, the Little Stranger (1989), The Fifth Season (1997) and Saint Mary (1997). Other well-known films he had performed in include The Man Who Became a Mouse (1985), The Night it Happened (1988), Angel Day (1993), and Leila's Sleep (2007). He graduated with a bachelor's degree in performance arts from Tehran University's Faculty of Fine Arts. In 1961, with director Hamid Samandarian, he and other artists formed an acting troupe named Pasargad. Since then, Poorhosseini had appeared in more than 35 movies, over 70 TV shows and 60 theater performances.

He died of COVID-19 at Firoozgar Hospital in Tehran, aged 79.

== Filmography ==
Year	Title	Notes
2018	Bache Mohandes	(TV Series)
2017	Asphyxia	
2017	Ghātel-e ahli	
2016	Alijenāb	(TV series)
2014	Hussein, Who Said No	
2014	Dowran-e Āsheghi	
2014	Haft Sang	(TV Series)
2011	The Recall	(TV Series)
2010	Leila's Dream	(as Parviz Poor-Hoseini)
2008	Disconnection	(Short)
2007	Yek mosht par-e oghāb	(TV series)
2006	Avvalin shab-e ārāmesh	(TV series)
2005	Mokhtārnāmeh	(TV series)
2004	Nazr	(TV movie)
2002	Tenth Night	(TV series)
1999	Once Upon a Time in Tehran	
1998	Dialogue with the Wind	(Short)
1997	Komite-ye mojāzāt	
1997	The Fifth Season	
1997	Saint Mary	(TV movie)
1993	Bolandi-hā-ye sefr	
1993	Rouz-e fereshte	
1991	Avinār	
1991	Rāh-o birāh	
1991	Valley of the Butterflies	
1990	Renault Tehran 29	
1990	The Herald	
1989	Kashti-ye Angelica	
1989	Shab-e hādese	
1989	Bashu, the Little Stranger	
1988	Bahār dar pāyiz	
1988	Telesm	
1987	Hezār Dastān	(TV mini-series)
1987	The Station	
1987	Treasure	
1986	Mehmāni-ye khosousi	
1986	Mute Contact	
1986	The Finish Line	
1986	Sarāb	
1985	Mardi ke moush shod	
1984	Kamālolmolk	
1980	Salandar	(Short)
1972	The Spring	(TV movie)
