= Tenth Night =

- Persian: شب دهم
- Genre: Drama
- Written by: Hassan Fathi
- Directed by: Hassan Fathi
- Starring: Hossein Yari; Katayoun Riahi; Roya Teymourian; Soraya Ghasemi; Parviz Poorhosseini; Parviz Fallahipour; Mahmoud Pak Niat; Akram Mohammadi; Ebrahim Abadi; Atash Taqipour; Sedigheh Kianfar
- Theme music composer: Alireza Ghorbani
- Composer: Fardin Khalatbari
- Country of origin: Iran
- Original language: Persian
- No. of seasons: 1
- No. of episodes: 14

Production
- Producer: Hassan Beshkufeh
- Production location: Tehran
- Cinematography: Kazem Shahbazi
- Editor: Arash Moayerian
- Running time: 50-55 minutes

Original release
- Release: 6 May – 20 May 2002

Tenth Night (Persian: شب دهم) is an Iranian drama series. The series is written and directed by Hassan Fathi.

== Storyline ==
The story of the series takes place during the reign of Reza Shah in Tehran. A person named Heidar Khoshmaram (Hossein Yari), who is from old Tehran, wants to marry a girl (Katayoun Riahi) of Qajar descent and that girl stipulates the condition of marriage with Haidar is to perform ta'ziyeh on the ten nights of Muharram. What happens to Heidar during the ta'ziyeh changes his character and...

== Cast ==
- Hossein Yari
- Katayoun Riahi
- Roya Teymourian
- Soraya Ghasemi
- Parviz Poorhosseini
- Parviz Fallahipour
- Mahmoud Pak Niat
- Akram Mohammadi
- Ebrahim Abadi
- Atash Taqipour
- Sedigheh Kianfar
- Shahin Alizadeh
- Ramsin Kebriti
- Abbas Zafari
- Mohammad Reza Ghasemi
- Mozaffar Moghaddam
- Farshid Samadipour
- Alaeddin Ghassemi
- Hossein Khanibeik
- Amir Atashani
- Hossein Afshar
- Manoochehr Azar
- Hamid Reza Afshar
- Amir Baranlooyi
- Pantea Mohammadi
- Jaber Ghafarian
- Nasser Gitijah
- Davoud Jafarpour
- Shapoor Kalhor
- Mohammad Varshochi
- Ahmad Azizi
- Sedigheh Kianfar
- Maryam MehrAli
- Morshedali Torabi
- Ali Zabihi
- Mehdi Jamshidi
- Masoud Taslimi
