= Harmless Ruler =

Amire Bi Gazand
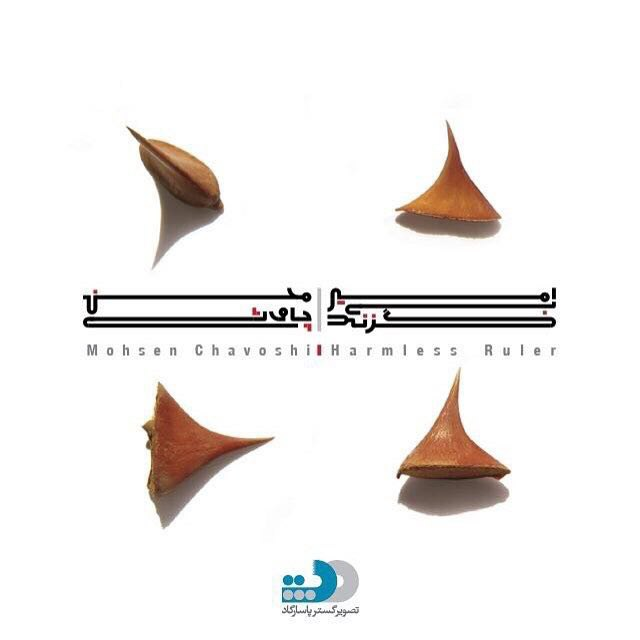

Studio album by Mohsen Chavoshi
- Released: June 2016
- Recorded: 2014–2016
- Genre: Persian rock
- Length: 55:00
- Label: Tasvir Gostar Pasargad

Mohsen Chavoshi chronology
Parouye Bi Ghayegh (2014)	Amire Bi Gazand (2016)	Abraham (2018)

Amire Bi Gazand (Persian: امیر بی‌گزند) means Harmless Ruler is the eighth official studio album by Iranian singer Mohsen Chavoshi. The album is a record for the most downloads in Persian music.

== Track listing ==
No.	Title	Lyrics	Music	Meaning	Length
1.	"Amire Bi Gazand"	Rumi	Mohsen Chavoshi	Harmless Ruler	4:00
2.	"Dele Man"	Rumi	Behrooz Saffarian	My Heart	3:56
3.	"Changiz"	Ali Akbar Yaghitabar	Behrooz Saffarian	Genghis	5:02
4.	"In Kist In?"	Rumi	Mohsen Chavoshi	Who Is This?	3:30
5.	"Jang Zadeh"	Pedram Parizi	Farshad Hesami	War-Torn	4:37
6.	"Shaydaei"	Rumi	Koushan Haddad	Fascination	4:21
7.	"Shah Maghsood"	Hossein Safaa	Adel Rouhnavaz	Shah Maghsood	6:42
8.	"Parishan"	Saadi	Mohsen Chavoshi	BewiIdered	3:02
9.	"Sharmsari"	Hossein Safaa	Babak Naghavi	Shame	5:43
10.	"Akharin Otoboos"	Hossein Safaa	Farshad Hesami	The Last Bus	4:48
11.	"Taryagh"	Rumi	Mohsen Chavoshi	Antidote	5:39
12.	"Motesel"	Rumi	Mohsen Chavoshi	Connected	3:43
Total length:					55:00

== See also ==
- Rumi
- Saadi Shirazi
