= Pierre Dagher =

Lebanese actor

- بيير داغر
- Born: April 23, 1963 (age 62); Lebanon
- Occupation: Actor

Pierre Dagher (born April 23, 1963) is a Lebanese actor.

== Filmography ==
=== Film ===
- One Day I'll Leave - Mazen. 2015
- 33 Days - Avi. 2012
- Damascus Time

=== Television ===
- Qiyamat Al Banadiq - Abu Ali Malham Qasem. 2013
- Al Ghaliboun. 2011
- Zero Degree Turn. 2007
- Khalid ibn al-Walid - Abu Ubaidah ibn al-Jarrah. 2006
- Made In Iran. 2011

=== Dubbing roles ===
- Prophet Joseph - Jacob
