= Iraj Rad =

Iranian actor (born 1945)

- ایرج راد
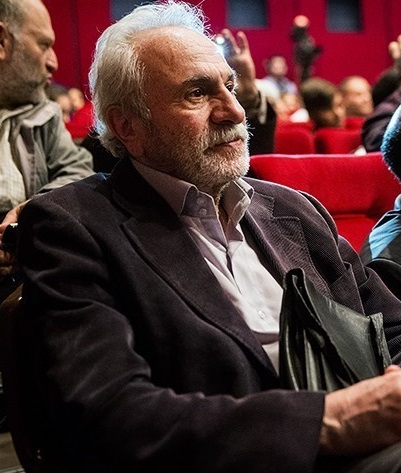
- Born: Akbar Hassani Rad; April 27, 1945 (age 81); Tehran, Iran
- Education: University of Tehran; Cardiff University
- Occupation: Actor
- Years active: 1966–present

Iradj Raad (Persian: ایرج راد; born 1945, in Tehran) is an Iranian actor.

He studied theatre in FFATU and Cardiff University in Wales.

== Some of his plays ==
- The Postman, 1972
- The Cycle, 1975 (screened in 1978)
- The Lodgers, 1986
- Half of the World, 1992
- Passion of Love, 1999
- A Candle in Wind, 2003
- Madare sefr darajeh, 2007
