= All That Is =

2018 Iranian drama TV series

- Persian: هست و نیست
- Genre: Drama
- Written by: Nader Vahid
- Directed by: Hossein Soheilizadeh
- Starring: Farhad Ghaemian; Enayatollah Bakhshi; Hamid Reza Pegah; Elham Pavehnejad; Mani Heidari; Shaghayegh Farahani; Negar Abedi; Amir Dezhakam; Siamak Atlasi; Akbar Rahmati; Solmaz Hesari; Siavash Kheirabi; Ghazaleh Akrami
- Opening theme: Alireza Javid
- Ending theme: Sina Shabankhani
- Composer: Fardin Ghareh Gazloo
- Country of origin: Iran
- Original language: Persian
- No. of seasons: 1
- No. of episodes: 30

Production
- Producer: Mohsen Shayanfar
- Production location: Tehran
- Cinematography: Reza Sheibani
- Editor: Amin Abedi
- Running time: 40–45 minutes

Original release
- Network: IRIB TV2
- Release: 3 February – 8 March 2018

All That Is (Persian: هست و نیست; Hast o Nist) is a 2018 Iranian drama TV series directed by Hossein Soheilizadeh. This series has been rebroadcast several times on the iFilm network.

== Storyline ==
Sometimes, people are tied to a temptation that is not easily untied...!

Two friends named Hamid (Hamid Reza Pegah) and Farhad (Farhad Ghaemian) marry two sisters and gradually each takes a different path and moves away from each other, And then, adventures arise and create problems for these two old friends...

== Cast ==
- Farhad Ghaemian as Farhad Moshafegh
- Enayatollah Bakhshi as Ghodrat
- Hamid Reza Pegah as Hamid Yeganeh
- Elham Pavehnejad as Elham
- Mani Heidari as Khosro Majd
- Shaghayegh Farahani as Mansooreh
- Negar Abedi as Narges
- Amir Dezhakam as Bahador
- Siamak Atlasi as Jalal Khoram
- Akbar Rahmati as Khojasteh
- Solmaz Hesari as Elnaz
- Siavash Kheirabi as Siavash Moeini
- Ghazaleh Akrami as Ava Yeganeh
- Nazanin Karimi as Mojgan
- Ava Daroit as Baran Moshafegh
- Ali Moslemi as Mahyar Moshafegh
- Pejvak Imani
- Fardin Ghareh Gazloo
- Morteza Aliabadi
- Iman Saraf
- Mehdi Gholami
