= Saba Kamali =

Iranian actress (born 1975)

- صبا کمالی
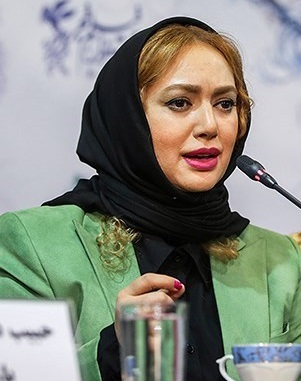
- Kamali at the 36th Fajr Film Festival
- Born: October 17, 1975 (age 50); Sari, Iran
- Education: Tehran University of Art (MM)
- Occupation: Actress
- Years active: 1999–present

Saba Kamali (Persian: صبا کمالی; born October 17, 1975) is an Iranian actress.

== Career ==
She began her career with stage acting in 1997, and later made her film debut with 'Born in the Month of Mehr' (1999).

Kamali, however, found fame with the series After the Rain (2000).

She established herself as an actress with the period dramas 'The British Briefcase' (1999) and 'Shahriyar' (2006).

The Iranian actress has also appeared in 'The Black Eyes' (2002), 'Boutique' (2003), 'There's Always a Woman Involved' (2007) and 'The Redemption' (2010).

She won the Best Actress Award at the 3rd Tehran Theater Festival for her performance in the play 'From Nothingness to Humanity'.

=== Arrest ===
On 12 September 2019, an arrest warrant was issued for Kamali after her post on Instagram in support of Sahar Khodayari, who self-immolated after she was prosecuted for trying to enter the Azadi Stadium, an act which is considered illegal for Iranian females. In her post, she published an imaginary dialogue with Husayn ibn Ali questioning the relevance of ceremonial Ashura event.

== Filmography ==
- After the Rain (TV series)
- Roozegar-e Gharib TV series
- The English Briefcase (TV series)
- Motevalled-e Mah-e Mehr
- Cheshman-e Siah
- Boutique
- Hamisheh Pa-ye yek zan dar mian ast
- The Redemption
