= Zero Degree Turn =

Multi-national television series

- Shahab Hosseini
- مدار صفر درجه
- Created by: Hassan Fathi
- Starring: Shahab Hosseini; Nathalie Matti; Mostafa Abdollahi; Iraj Rad; Laya Zanganeh; Roya Teymourian; Masoud Rayegan; Pierre Dagher; Ateneh Faghih Nasiri; Payam Dehkordi; Rahim Noroozi; Farrokh Nemati; Esmail Shangaleh; Fadi Edward; Hasmiq Taschgian; Ahmad Saatchian; Ali Ghorban Zadeh; Kiumars Malekmotei; Gyula Mesterházy; Álmos Szalay
- Music by: Alireza Ghorbani
- Ending theme: When I Fell in Love (Vaghti Ke Man Ashegh Shodam)
- Countries of origin: Iran; Hungary; France; Lebanon
- Original languages: Persian; French; German
- No. of episodes: 30

Production
- Executive producer: Hassan Beshkoufeh
- Cinematography: Morteza Poursamadi
- Running time: Each episode approximately 50 minutes

Original release
- Network: Channel 1 (Iran)
- Release: April 23, 2007 – November 2007

Zero Degree Turn or Zero Degree Latitude (Persian: مدار صفر درجه Madâr-e sefr darajeh) is a 2007 television series, made through the cooperation of Iran, Hungary, France, and Lebanon. The program was one of the most expensive and elaborate ever produced by Iran and attracted a large audience there. It is inspired by a real-life story about Iranian diplomat Abdol Hossein Sardari, who saved Jews in 1940s Paris during the Nazi Occupation by giving out Iranian passports and allowing them refuge in the Iranian Embassy. It has been noted that neither character names nor the story are close to Sardari's story.

== Plot ==
Set in the time of the Second World War, Madare Sefr Darajeh follows the life of an Iranian student named Habib Parsa (Shahab Hosseini) who travels to Paris to study. There Habib meets a French Jewish woman named Sara Astrok, a student at the same university. At first antagonistic toward one another, Habib and Sarah eventually fall in love. They run into many problems, including persecution by the Nazis and by Sarah's Zionist uncle, but are united in the end.

== Cast ==
- Shahab Hosseini as Habib Parsa
- Nathalie Matti as Sara Astrok
- Roya Taymourian as Asieh
- Masoud Rayegan as Mohammadhossein Parsa
- Pierre Dagher as Behrooz Fattahi
- Laya Zanganeh as Ziant-ol-molok
- Ateneh Faghih Nasiri as Saideh
- Mostafa Abdollahi
- Iraj Rad as Jahangir Homayoon Panah
- Payam Dehkordi as Sardar Ehtesham
- Rahim Noroozi as Taghi
- Farrokh Nemati as Colonel Arsia
- Esmail Shangaleh as Heshmati
- Bahman Hashemi
- Fadi Edward
- Hasmiq Taschgian
- Ahmad Saatchian as Mohsen Mozafar
- Ali Ghorban Zadeh as Ardeshir Tavakoli
- Kiumars Malekmotei as Mizanchy
- Gyula Mesterházy
- Ramsin Kebriti as Lieutenant Moheb Ali
- Álmos Szalay
- Biuk Mirzaei as Yadi
- Amirhossein Fathi
- Sadreddin Shajareh

== Opinions ==
The government-financed film has been widely cited as an effort by the government to demonstrate its positions in regards to the difference between Jews and Zionists, encompassing sympathy for the Jewish people (including an orthodox view of the Holocaust) while remaining hostile to Zionism.

The director of the series, Hassan Fathi, said about it, "I decided to produce this series in 2002, and in those days the Holocaust was not an issue. Even if one single Jew is killed in German camps, the world should be ashamed. By the same token, if a single Palestinian dies, the world should be ashamed. I sympathize with the Jewish victims of World War II, to the same extent with women and children victims of the war in Palestine."

The TV series won the praise and support of Iran's Jewish Association, an independent body that safeguards the community's culture and heritage. The association has criticized Mr. Ahmadinejad's comments about the Holocaust but has praised Mr. Fatthi's show.

== DVD release ==
The series was retitled Zero Point Orbit for its 2007 release by Bita Film, Tarzana, California. The Persian title is unchanged. The DVDs include neither English nor Persian subtitles.

== English dub ==
The series has an English dub that was recorded in Hong Kong by Red Angel Media.
