= Katayoun Riahi =

Iranian actress (born 1961)

- کتایون ریاحی
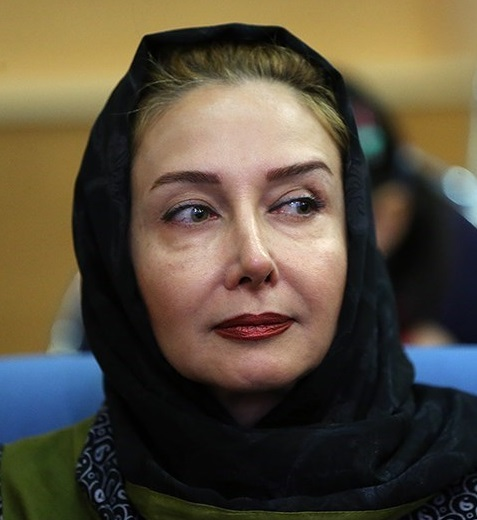
- Riahi in 2016
- Born: December 31, 1961 (age 64); Tehran, Iran
- Occupation: Actress
- Years active: 1985–present
- Spouse(s): Farshid Rahimian (div.); Masoud Behbehaninia (div.)

Katayoun Riahi (Persian: کتایون ریاحی, romanized: Katâyun Riyâhi; born 31 December 1961) is an Iranian actress, and has received various accolades, including three Hafez Awards, nominations for a Crystal Simorgh, and an Iran Cinema Celebration Award. Riahi rose to prominence for her performance as Zoleykha in Prophet Joseph (2008–2009). She won the Best Actress award at the 26th Cairo International Film Festival for her performance in The Last Supper (2002).

She is also the founder and CEO of the Komak Charity Foundation and an ambassador of the Mehrafarin Foundation in Iran.

== Career ==
It was with the series' Days of Life (1998), After the Rain (1999) and The 10th Night (2001) that she established herself as a capable actress.

She also played a starring role in the series Prophet Joseph (2009).

Many critics believe that Riyahi's best performance was in the movie The Last Supper (2001), a role which accorded her a Best Actress nomination at the 20th Fajr International Film Festival.

Her outstanding performance in the movie This Woman Won't Talk (2002) earned her a Best Actress Award at the 7th Iran Cinema Celebration.

Riyahi has also appeared in a number of movies, including The Stranger (1987), Apartment 13 (1990), The Kind Moon (1995), Lighter Than Darkness (2002) and Invitation (2008).

== Arrest ==
Riahi was one of the first celebrities who took off her hijab amidst the 2022 nationwide protests and in support of the people wrote: "Iranian women are the voices of one another" and "Enough with the lies"!. Security forces arrested her in her villa in the suburbs of Qazvin.

== Filmography ==
=== Film ===
Year	Title	Role	Director	Notes	Ref(s)
1987	Payizan	Parvaneh	Rasoul Sadrameli		
1995	Dear Moon		Ghasem Jafari		
1996	The Tortoise		Ali Shah Hatami		
2002	The Last Supper	Mahin Mashreghi	Fereydoun Jeyrani		
2003	The Woman Keeps Silent	Soraya Ardalan	Ahmad Amini		
2003	My Lady		Yadollah Samadi		
2004	Tara and the Strawberry Fever	Taraneh	Saeed Soheili		
2004	Somewhere Else	Tara	Mehdi Karampour		
2008	Shirin	Woman in audience	Abbas Kiarostami		
2008	Invitation	Afsaneh	Ebrahimi Hatamikia		
TBA	Funnel		Mohsen Amiryoussefi	Post-production	

=== Television ===
Year	Title	Role	Director	Notes	Network	Ref(s)
1998	Days of Life				IRIB TV3	
1993	Pedar Salar				IRIB TV2	
2000	Pine's Voice				IRIB TV3	
2001	After the Rain				IRIB TV3	
2002	Tenth Night	Banou			IRIB TV1	
2002	Sun Night				IRIB TV3	
2005	Walking Dead				IRIB TV3	
2008–2009	Prophet Joseph	Zoleykha			IRIB TV1	
