= The Recall (TV series) =

2011 television series

- Persian: یادآوری
- Genre: Drama
- Written by: Roya Ghafari
- Directed by: Hojat Ghasemzadeh Asl
- Starring: Amir Aghaei; Mehran Ahmadi; Farhad Ghaemian; Afshin Sangchap; Roya Teymourian; Soraya Ghasemi; Parviz Poorhosseini; Masoud Rayegan; Behnaz Jafari; Roozbeh Hesari; Vahid Jalilvand; Matin Sotoudeh; Soheila Razavi; Parivash Nazarieh; Nima Hashemi
- Theme music composer: Reza Yazdani
- Composer: Saeed Zehni
- Country of origin: Iran
- Original language: Persian
- No. of seasons: 1
- No. of episodes: 41

Production
- Producer: Ahmad Zali
- Production location: Tehran
- Cinematography: Mohammad Naseri
- Editor: Shouka Zandbaf
- Running time: 40 minutes

Original release
- Release: 21 July – 10 September 2011

The Recall (Persian: یادآوری) is an Iranian Drama series. The series is directed by Hojat Ghasemzadeh Asl.

== Storyline ==
The Recall tells the story of people who, after death, have a chance to live again. Those who are destined, they face death and return to life and now, these survivors are trying to...

== Cast ==
- Amir Aghaei
- Mehran Ahmadi
- Farhad Ghaemian
- Afshin Sangchap
- Roya Teymourian
- Soraya Ghasemi
- Parviz Poorhosseini
- Masoud Rayegan
- Behnaz Jafari
- Vahid Jalilvand
- Matin Sotoudeh
- Soheila Razavi
- Parivash Nazarieh
- Farokh Nemati
- Nima Hashemi
- Roozbeh Hesari
- Maryam Boubani
- Bahram Ebrahimi
- Mehrdad Ziaei
- Ghasem Zare
- Ali Osivand
- Pardis Ahmadieh
- Rahim Norouzi
- Amir Hossein Modares
- Majidi Moshiri
- Ghorban Najafi
- Hossein Fallah
- Mahvash Sabrkon
- Atabak Naderi
- Nader Fallah
- Khosro Farokhzad
- Mehran Zeighami
