= Abraham (album) =

Ebrahim

Studio album by Mohsen Chavoshi
- Released: September 2, 2018
- Recorded: 2017
- Studio: Personal studio of Mohsen Chavoshi, Metalworks studios
- Genre: Pop, epic, orchestral pop, synth-pop, electronic rock, soft rock, pop rock, progressive rock
- Length: 38:56
- Label: Segal Rasaane Moaser
- Producer: Hadi Hosseini

Mohsen Chavoshi chronology
Harmless Ruler (2016)	Ebrahim (2018)

Ebrahim (Persian: ابراهیم) is the ninth official studio album by Iranian singer Mohsen Chavoshi. Chavoshi released To Dar Masafate Barani... and Ma Bozorgo Naadanim... online and without proper permissions from Ministry of Culture and Islamic Guidance but soon they got removed from Chavoshi's official Telegram channel and Beeptunes. The songs are available on the VIP edition of the album which includes Mohsen Chavoshi's autograph on its back cover and Hossein Safaa's poetry book, titled Catapult (Persian: منجنیق), with his autograph on the first page.

== Track listing ==
No.	Title	Lyrics	Music	Meaning	Length
1.	"Bebor Be Name Khodavandat..."	Hossein Safaa	Mohsen Chavoshi	Slit In the Name of Your God...	4:52
2.	"To Dar Masafate Barani..."	Hossein Safaa	Mohsen Chavoshi	You're In the Distance of the Rain...	3:40
3.	"Dar Astaneye Piri..."	Hossein Safaa	Mohsen Chavoshi	On the Verge of Aging...	4:51
4.	"Hamrahe Khak Arreh..."	Hossein Safaa	Mohsen Chavoshi	Along With the Saw Dust...	5:21
5.	"Lotfan Be Bande Avale Sababeat Begoo..."	Hossein Safaa	Mohsen Chavoshi	Please Tell the First Knuckle of Your Forefinger...	5:31
6.	"Ey Mahe Mehr..."	Hossein Safaa	Mohsen Chavoshi	O Month of Mehr...	6:23
7.	"Ma Bozorgo Naadanim..."	Hossein Safaa	Mohsen Chavoshi	We Are Big and Fool...	4:44
8.	"Jahane Fasede Mardom Ra..."	Hossein Safaa	Mohsen Chavoshi	On Today's People's Corrupt World...	3:34
Total length:					38:56

== Personnel ==
Musicians

- Mohsen Chavoshi - vocals, keyboard
- Adel Rouhnavaz - electric guitar
- Tohid Noori - piano
- Meisam Marvasti - violin, setar

Production

- Hadi Hosseini - producer
- Mohsen Chavoshi - arrangement (except those noted)
- Shahaab Akbari - arrangement (In the Distance of the Rain and Corrupt World...)
- Farshaad Hesami - arrangement (Please Tell... and Hey Month of Mehr)
- Mehdi Moezi - administration manager
- Abolfazl Afshari - coordination manager
- Mohsen Asgari - graphic designer
