= Nazer and Manzur =

Nazer and Manzur (Persian: ناظر و منظور) is a sixteenth century poem written by Safavid era Persian poet Vahshi Bafqi, notable for featuring a romantic relationship between two men. Nazer is son of the Vizier who falls in love with Manzur, the King's son.

== Synopsis ==
After many years of trying, a king and his vizier both have children at the same time. The king names his son Manzur and the vizier's son Nazer. The two boys go to school together, and in school, Nazer falls in love with Manzur, who is very beautiful. The teacher finds out and reveals their love to the vizier.

Fearing the king, the vizier thinks of a solution to separate the two: so Nazer, at the request of his father, but despite his own desire, is forced to leave the country with tearful eyes in order to learn trade and commerce. Manzur spends his days alone, unaware of Nazer's whereabouts. In the end, the two find each other, Manzur becomes king, and makes Nazer his vizier.
