= Ateneh Faghih Nasiri =

Iranian actress

- آتنه فقیه‌نصیری
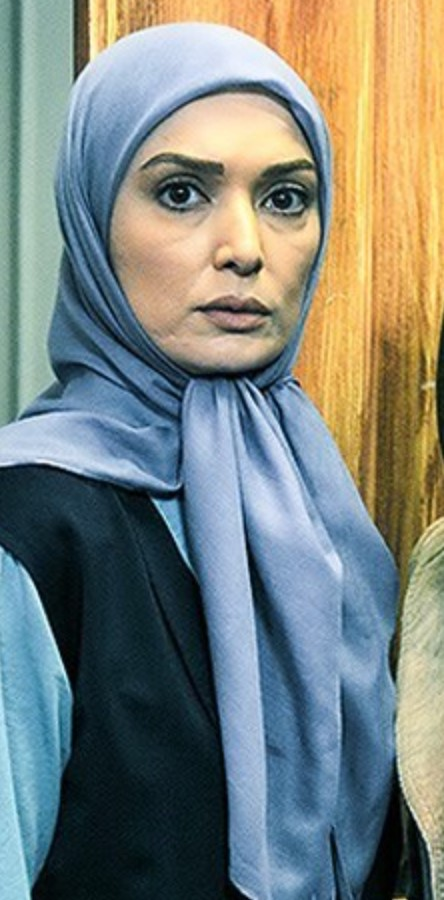
- Born: 14 November 1968 (age 57); Tehran, Iran
- Education: Islamic Azad University
- Occupation: Actress
- Years active: 1991–present
- Notable work: Khaneye Sabz (The Green House); Khaleh Sara (Aunt Sara); Do Nafar-o Nesfi (Two and a Half Man); Mazraeye Pedari (Fatherhood Farm)
- Spouse: Fariborz Arabnia (m. 1991; div. 1999)

Ateneh Faghih Nasiri (Persian: آتنه فقیه‌نصیری; born 14 November 1968) is an Iranian actress. She is best known for playing the title role in the TV series Khaleh Sara (Aunt Sara) and her portrayal of Leili in the popular TV show Khaneye Sabz (The Green House).

== Personal life ==
Faghih Nasiri was born in Tehran and spent her childhood in various cities around Iran because of her father's job. She was married to Iranian actor Fariborz Arabnia until their divorce in 1999.

In April 2016, Faghih Nasiri announced that she had been diagnosed with Multiple sclerosis.

== Artistic career ==
Ateneh Faghih Nasiri made her cinematic debut in 1991 with the film Thieves Don't Go to Heaven. The following year, she transitioned to television by appearing in the series The Fountain of Life (Cheshmeh-ye Zendeghi). Her rise to fame came with notable roles in the 1992 television series Aunt Sara (Khaleh Sara) and the highly popular The Green House (Khaneye Sabz) in 1996.

Some of her other significant works in the field of acting include her performances in Zero Degree Orbit (Madare Sefr Darajeh), Shamdouni, and The Graduates (Lisanseha).

== Television ==
Year	Title	Role	Network
2007	Zero Degree Turn	Habib's Sister	IRIB TV1
2013	Mehr Abad		IRIB TV5
2015	Geranium	Zohreh	IRIB TV3
2016–2018	Bachelors	Fereshteh Rahimi	IRIB TV3
2017	Shahrzad	Sorayya	Lotus Play

== See also ==
- Iranian cinema
