= Douch (film) =

- دوچ
- Directed by: Amir Mashhadi Abbas
- Written by: Amir Mashhadi Abbas
- Produced by: Institute for the Intellectual Development of Children and Young Adults
- Starring: Soraya Qasemi; Soroush Jamshidy; Koroush Soleymani; Shiva Khosrow Mehr
- Distributed by: Farabi Cinema Foundation
- Release date: 4 February 2018
- Country: Iran
- Language: Persian

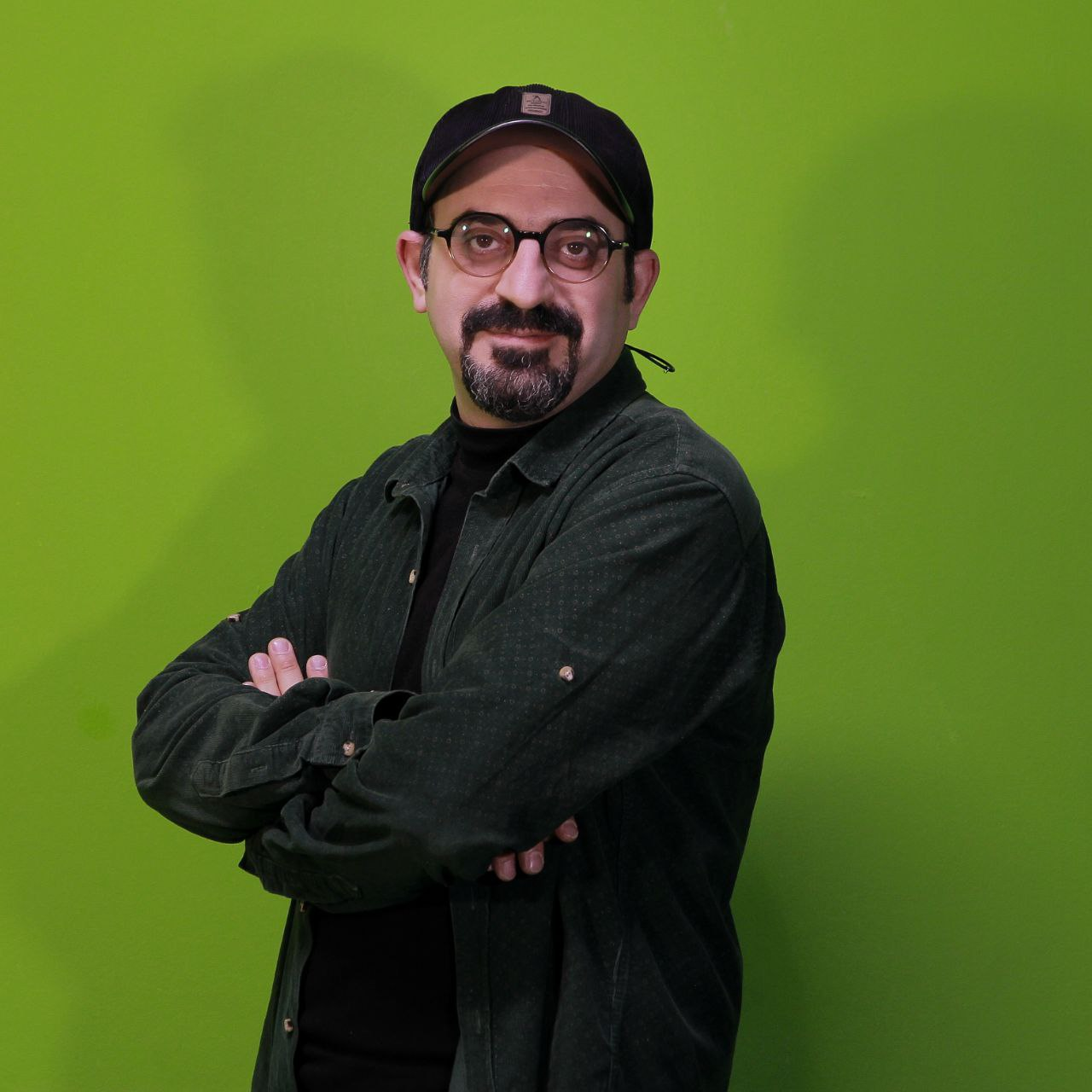
Director and writer, Amir Mashhadi Abbas

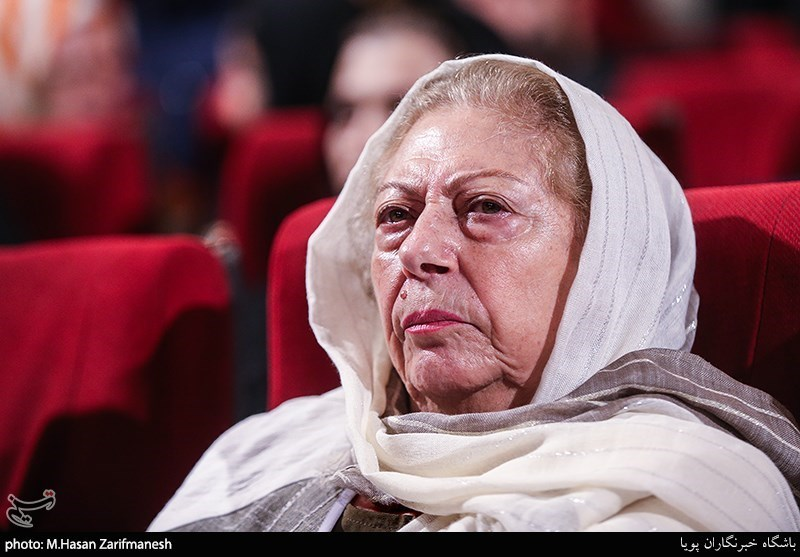
Starring actress, Soraya Qasemi

Douch (Persian: دوچ) is a 2018 Persian-language Iranian film directed and written by Amir Mashhadi Abbas, produced by the Institute for the Intellectual Development of Children and Young Adults, and distributed by the Farabi Cinema Foundation. The film features Soraya Qasemi, Soroush Jamshidy, Koroush Soleymani, and Shiva Khosrow Mehr in starring roles.

== Plot ==
Ten-year-old Gholamreza, who lives in a village in northern Iran, needs a bicycle to win a bicycle race and pay off his father's debt. To get money for the new bicycle, he notices a prize for teaching an illiterate person how to read and write, but there are no illiterate people in the village except a 90-year-old bad-tempered woman who is unwilling to learn.

== Awards ==
- The movie won the UNICEF Award at the 31st International Film Festival for Children and Youth.
- Shown at 59th of Zlín Film Festival
