= Farhad Ghaemian =

Iranian actor

Farhad Ghaemian فرهاد قائمیان
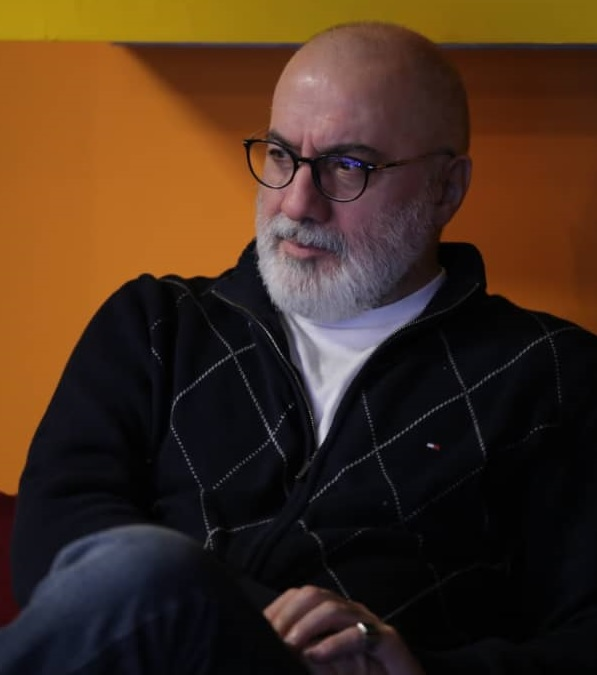
- Born: 6 March 1966 (age 60); Ardabil, Iran
- Occupations: Theatre and film actor
- Years active: 1991–present

Farhad Ghaemian (Persian: فرهاد قائمیان) is an Iranian actor born on March 6, 1966 in Ardabil, Iran.

== Filmography ==
- Paradise of Criminals
- All That Is
- Bodyguard
- Hussein Who Said No
- Nardebam-e Aseman
- Misunderstanding of a dream
- Gando (TV series)
- The Recall
- Flying Passion
- Predicament
