= International Theatre Festival For Children & Youth =

Theatre festival in Iran

International Theatre Festival For Children’s & Youth
- Founded: September 20, 1991; 34 years ago
- Language: Persian; English

Iran's annual International Theatre Festival For Children & Youth (Persian: جشنواره بین‌المللی تئاتر کودک و نوجوان), is a theatre festival in Iran, held for the thirtieth time in 2025.

== History ==
The first nationwide children and youth theatre festival titled "Hope" was held in September 1991 in Hamedan, Iran.

== International Theatre Festival For Children & Youth editions ==
- 1st International Theater Festival For Children & Youth (20 –26 September 1991)
- 2nd International Theater Festival For Children & Youth (03 –9 October 1992)
- 3rd International Theater Festival For Children & Youth (02 –9 October 1993)
- 4th International Theater Festival For Children & Youth (30 October – 6 November 1994)
- 5th International Theater Festival For Children & Youth (30 October – 5 November 1995)
- 6th International Theater Festival For Children & Youth (28 October – 3 November 1996)
- 7th International Theater Festival For Children & Youth (22 November 1997)
- 8th International Theater Festival For Children & Youth (29 November - 4 December 1998)
- 9th International Theater Festival For Children & Youth (4 December 1999)
- 10th International Theater Festival For Children & Youth (24–29 October 2000)
- 11th International Theater Festival For Children & Youth (24 December 2001 - 28 December 2001)
- 12th International Theater Festival For Children & Youth (30 April 2005 - 4 May 2005)
- 13th International Theater Festival For Children & Youth (10 - 14 October 2006)
- 14th International Theater Festival For Children & Youth (28 October - 1 November 2007)
- 15st International Theater Festival For Children & Youth (07 - 11 October 2008)
- 16th International Theater Festival For Children & Youth (04 - 8 October 2009)
- 17th International Theater Festival For Children & Youth (29 September - 3 October 2010)
- 18th International Theater Festival For Children & Youth (06 - 11 November 2011)
- 19th International Theater Festival For Children & Youth (07 - 13 October 2012)
- 20th International Theater Festival For Children & Youth (16 - 22 October 2013)
- 21st International Theater Festival For Children & Youth (07 - 13 October 2014)
- 22nd International Theater Festival For Children & Youth (01 - 6 October 2015)
- 23rd International Theater Festival For Children & Youth (12 - 17 December 2016)
- 24th International Theater Festival For Children & Youth (01 - 6 December 2017)
- 25th International Theater Festival For Children & Youth (19 - 25 November 2018)
- 26th International Theater Festival For Children & Youth (07 - 12 November 2019)
- 27th International Theater Festival For Children & Youth (22 - 27 June 2022)
- 28th International Theater Festival For Children & Youth (20 - 27 February 2023)
- 29th International Theater Festival For Children & Youth (1 – 7 November 2024
- 30th International Theater Festival For Children & Youth (5 – 11 December 2025)
