= Naderi Café =

Iranian national heritage site

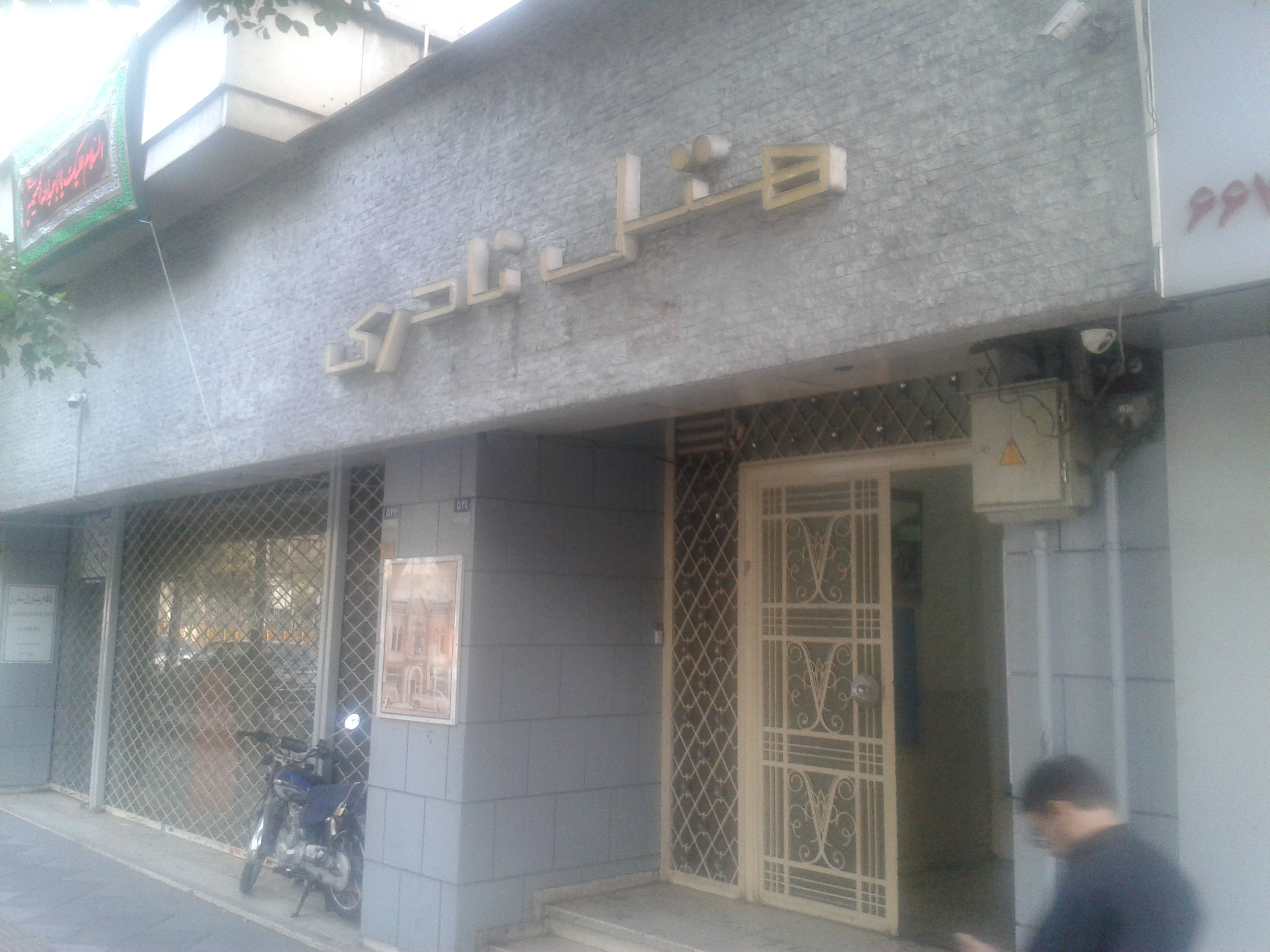
Cafe Naderi, Iran

Naderi Café (Persian: کافه نادری) is a café in Tehran. It is located to the east of Hafez overpass along Jomhouri-e Eslami Avenue.

Naderi Cafe was founded by an Armenian immigrant. The café has been frequented by many influential Iranian literary figures such as Jalal Al-e-Ahmad, Simin Daneshvar, Forugh Farrokhzad, and Sadegh Hedayat. In 2002, Naderi Café and Naderi Hotel were listed as a national monument under the registration number 10446.

In 2015, after it was reported that the café would be demolished for new development, the Iranian cultural heritage organisation announced that the demolition would not occur due to the café's designation as a national monument.
