= Soraya Qasemi =

Iranian actress (born 1940)

- ثریا قاسمی
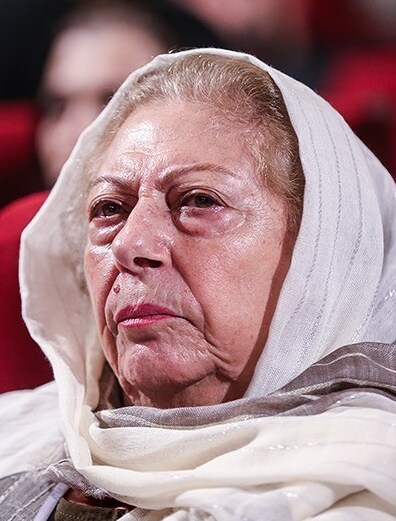
- Qasemi in 2019
- Born: 19 December 1940 (age 85)
- Occupation: Actress
- Years active: 1970–present
- Spouse: Rahim Barfaraz
- Children: 3
- Parent(s): Hamideh Kheirabadi (mother); Ali Molaghasem (father)

Soraya Qasemi (Persian: ثریا قاسمی; born 19 December 1940) is an Iranian actress. She was born in Tehran and her mother Hamideh Kheirabadi was known as Mother of the Iranian Cinema.

== Career ==
Soraya Qasemi is a renowned Iranian actress who began her acting career on television in 1973 with the series "Ghesse-ye Eshgh" (Tale of Love). Before the 1979 Iranian Revolution, she appeared in four television series and two films, establishing herself as a notable actress in the Iranian entertainment industry.

After a brief hiatus following the revolution, she returned to acting in 1986 at the age of 46, with the movie "Khaneye Abri" (The Cloudy House) and a year later with the series "Gorg-ha" (Wolves). Throughout her career, Qasemi has remained committed to acting, particularly excelling in voice acting, a profession she holds dear even after years in cinema. Her portrayal of strong female characters, particularly in Nasser Taghvai’s works, offered a fresh depiction of women in Iranian cinema.

In the early 1990s, Qasemi expanded her career by hosting various television programs and performing recitations of classical Persian poetry, showcasing her diverse talents beyond acting.

Qasemi’s versatility as an actress shone through after winning the Crystal Simorgh for Best Actress at the 19th Fajr Film Festival in 2001 for her role in "Maral." Following this recognition, she embraced more diverse roles, including in films like "The Last Supper" and "Dokhtar Shirini Forush" (The Pastry Girl).

Her short yet impactful role in "The Last Supper" earned her the Best Supporting Actress award from the Iranian Cinema House. Subsequently, she ventured more into comedy films after her successful performances in "Dokhtar Shirini Forush".

Her performances in the television series "Dar Panah To" (In Your Protection) and "Shabe Dahom" (The Tenth Night), directed by Hamid Labkhandeh and Hassan Fathi respectively, earned her widespread popularity. Additionally, her work in televised plays such as "Towards Damascus" (Hamid Samandarian), "Nekrasov" (Mohammad Rahmanian), and "Towards Ka'ba" (Tajbakhsh Fanaeian) further solidified her standing as a beloved and respected figure in Iranian theater.

== Personal life ==
In 1970, Soraya Qasemi married Rahim Barfaraz, and together they have three children: two sons, Behrooz and Babak, and a daughter named Banafsheh.

== Awards and honors ==
Through her decades-long career, Soraya Qasemi has been honored for both her dramatic and comedic roles.

- Crystal Simorgh for Best Actress at the 19th Fajr Film Festival for her role in "Maral" (2001).
- Crystal Simorgh for Best Supporting Actress at the 34th Fajr Film Festival for her role in "Villa Dwellers" (2016).
- Best Actress award at the Kansas City Film Festival for her role in "Maral."

== Filmography ==
- 2023: Mastooran 2 (TV series)
- 2020: Aghazadeh (TV series)
- 2018: Douch
- 2013: Sounds of Rain (TV series)
- 2012: Maternal Lullabies (TV movie)
- 2011: The Recall (TV Series)
- 2008: Invitation (Davat)
- 2008: Predicament (Makhmaseh)
- 2007: The Trial
- 2005: Salvation at 8:20
- 2005: The Birthday Chant
- 2002: The Last Supper
- 2002: The Pastry Girl
- 2002: Tenth Night
- 2001: Khakestari
- 2001: Maral
- 1992: The Statue
- 1989: Courtship
- 1988: Wolves (TV series)
- 1988: Setare o almas
- 1979: Zende bad
- 1973: Tranquility in the Presence of Others
- 1972: Bitter and Sweet (TV series)
