= Hassan Fathi =

Iranian film director and screenwriter

Hassan Fathi حسن فتحی
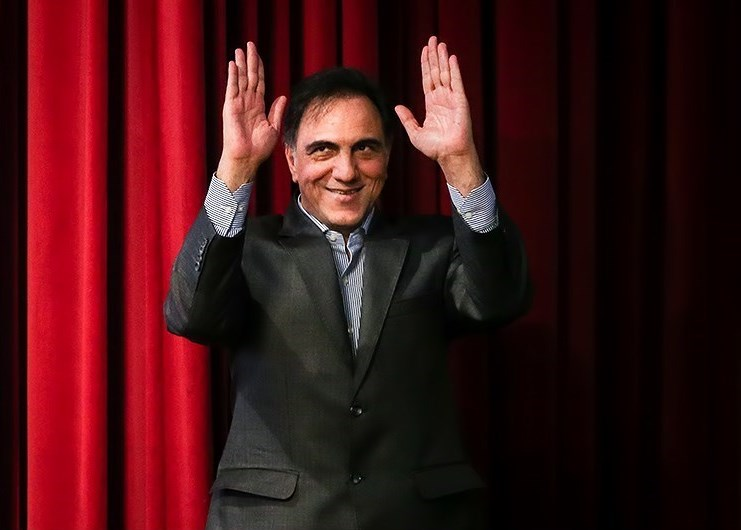
- Fathi in Shahrzad closing ceremony (May 2016)
- Born: September 2, 1959 (age 66); Tehran, Iran
- Occupations: film director; screenwriter; television director
- Notable work: Shahrzad; Tenth Night; Zero Degree Turn; The Forbidden Fruit; In the Strand of Zayandeh Rud
- Spouse: ——
- Children: 2

Hassan Fathi (Persian: حسن فتحی, born 2 September 1959) is an Iranian film director and screenwriter. He's one of the most well known and successful Iranian directors. Fathi is best known for his popular historical TV series.

== Marriage and Family ==
Hassan Fathi is married to Azam Boroujerdi. His wife holds a master's degree in dramatic literature and is the author of several plays.

Hassan Fathi and Azam Boroujerdi have two sons, Mohammadreza and Amir Hossein. Mohammadreza Fathi works in the field of music, while Amir Hossein Fathi is an actor.

== Career ==
He holds a bachelor's degree in psychology from the University of Shahid Beheshti and a master's degree in directing from the Islamic Azad University of Tehran. Fathi is a creative dramatist and psychologist. He started his artistic activities with playing in college theatre. However, he started his professional activities and entered the world of art since 1989 by writing critiques of theater and cinema in journals such as Soroush, Tamashakhaneh, Donyayetassvir, and Namayesh as well as theater writing and directing. In this respect, he can be considered a researcher art and cinema as well. Since 1993, he entered television and started making TV series and in 2004, he joined the directors of Iranian cinema by making the movie "Marriage, Iranian Style". Fathi also teaches as a professor at various universities and is now the educational manager of the Art and Cultural Institute of Karname. Fathi made two big series in Iran "Zero Degree Turn" and "Shahrzad". TV series of "Hamsayeha", "Pahlevanan nemimirand", "Farad dir ast", "Shabe dahom", "Mive Mamnooe", "Lighter Than Darkness", "Tears and Smiles", and "Dar masire zayandeh rood" as well as the tele-theaters of "A Murder Mystery", "Mousetrap", and telefilm of "Manuscript" are the results of 18 years of continuous activity of Hassan Fathi in the field of television programs.

== Filmography ==
=== Film ===
Year	Title	Notes
2004	Marriage, Iranian Style	
2008	The Postman Doesn't Knock Three Times	
2009	Punishment	
2012	Another Day	
2024	Intoxicated by Love	

=== Web ===
Year	Title	Platform
2015–2018	Shahrzad	Lotus Play
2022–2023	Jeyran	Filimo

=== series ===
- Directing the TV series "Hamsayeha", ("Neighbors"), Channel 2 - 1993
- Writing and directing the TV series "Pahlevanan Nemimirand", ("Heroes never die"), Channel 2 - 1996
- Directing the TV series "Farda dir ast", ("Tomorrow is too late"), Channel 3 - 1997
- Writing and directing the TV series "Roshantar az khamooshi", ("Lighter Than Darkness"), Sima Film - 1999
- Writing and directing the TV series "Tenth Night", ("Tenth Night"), Channel 1 - 2000
- Writing and directing the TV series "Zero Degree Turn", Channel 1 - 2005
- Directing the TV series "The Forbidden Fruit", written by Alireza Naderi and Alireza Kazemipour, Channel 2 - 2007
- Directing the TV series "Tears and Smiles", ("Ashkha va Labkhandha") written by Alireza Naderi and Alireza Kazemipour, Channel 1 - 2008
- Directing the TV series "In the Strand of Zayandeh Rud " written by Alireza Naderi, Channel 1 - 2010
- Directing the TV series "The Times", written by Alireza Kazemipour, Saeed Jalali, and Saeid Tashakori, Channel 3 - 2012

=== films ===
- Writing and directing the telefilm "A Typical Day" - 2012
- Writing and directing the telefilm "Manuscript" - 2003
- Rewriting and directing the telefilm "Remember Your Dreams" written by Farhad Towhidi - 2004
- Writing and directing the telefilm "Reverse Gear" - 2009
- Directing the telefilm "Carousels" written by Alireza Masoudi - 2012

== Documentaries ==
- Researching and writing of the 18-part documentary series on "History of the World Theatre"; Channel 2 - 1992
- Researching and writing an 18-part documentary series on "The History and Evolution of Art", Channel 2 - 1992
- Researching and writing a 26-part series on "The History of Iran Traditional Plays", Jame-Jam TV Network - 2007
- Writing and directing the documentary " unfinished trip" on the biography of Nader Ebrahimi - 2012

== Theaters ==
- Acting in the play "Four Boxes" written by Bahram Beyzai and directed by Ferdous Kavyani; Tehran, Niavaran Cultural Center (1980–2006)
- Writer and director of the play "Hey Hey Matador", City Theater of Tehran, Qashqai Hall, 1989
- Writer and director of "Hero and Fairy Mockery", Tehran, Hall of Art, 1990
- Directing the play "Inidra Judgment" written by Dhan Gopal Mukerji, Tehran, Sanglaj Hall, 1991
- Directing the play "In the Cold Streets of the Night" written by Azam Boroujerdi, Tehran, Azadi Museum, 1993
- Directing the tele-theatre " Queens of France" written by Toronto Wilder, Channel 2, 1994
- Directing and rewriting the tele-theatre "A Murder Mystery" written by Agatha Christie, Channel 2, 1994
- Directing the tele-theatre "Misunderstanding" by Albert Camus, Channel 2, 1995
- Directing and rewriting "The Mousetrap" written by Agatha Christie, Channel 2, 1996
- Directing and rewriting the tele-theatre "John Gabriel Borkman" written by Henrik Ibsen, Channel 2

== Awards and nominations ==
- Best Director Award for the telefilm "Reverse Gear", The first Jame-Jam TV Festival, January 2012
- Diploma of honor and a statuette for best director of the telefilm "Reverse Gear", The Fajr Film Festival, 2011
- Award for the best TV screenplay for the TV series "Shabe Dahom", Picture World Ceremony, 2002
- Diploma of honor and a golden statuette for the screenplay of "Shabe Dahom", The 4th Festival of Radio and Television, 2003
- Award for the best TV script for the TV series "Roshantar az khamooshi", The Picture World Ceremony, 2004
- Award for the best director of the series "Zero Degree Turn" and "Mive mammnooe", The Bests of Jame-Jam Global Channel Festival, audience voting, 2007
- nominated for the Crystal Simorgh for Best Director at the 27th Fajr International Film Festival for "Postchi se bar dar nemizanad", The Critics of Iran Cinema Ceremony, 2009
- Diploma of honor and a golden statue for artistic directing of the tele-theatre "A Murder Mystery", The IRIB Festival, 1995
