= Vahshi Bafqi =

Iranian poet (1532–1583)

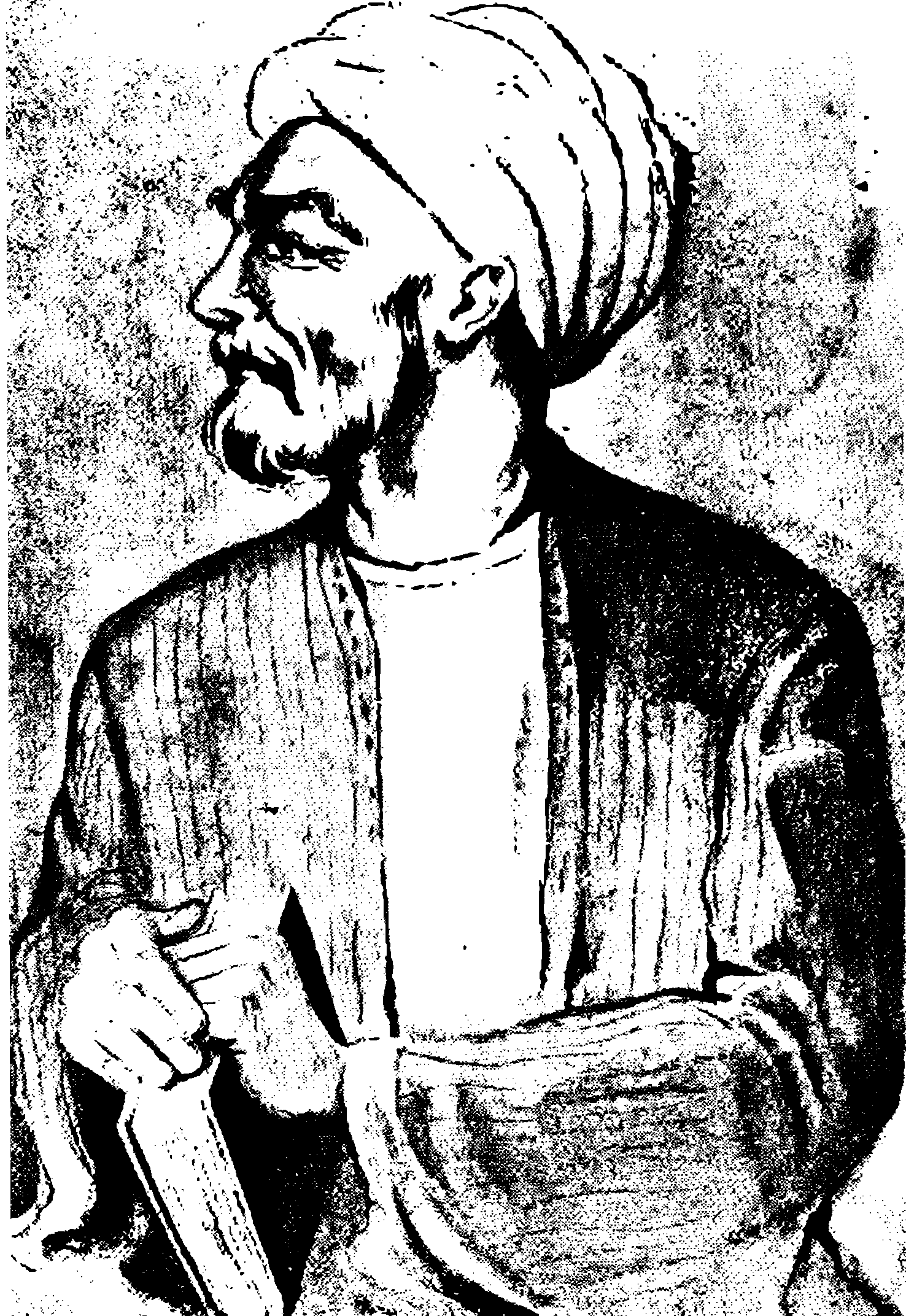
- A 1960 drawing of Vahshi Bafqi
- Born: 1532; Bafq, Safavid Iran
- Died: 1583 (aged 52); Yazd, Safavid Iran
- Notable works: Nazer and Manzur

Vahshi Bafqi (Persian: وحشی بافقی, romanized: Vahshi Bāfqi) was a Persian poet of the Safavid era, considered to be one of the greatest of his generation.

== Biography ==
Vahshi was born in 1532 in Bafq, an agrarian town near the provincial capital of Yazd in central Iran. In his hometown, Vahshi was taught poetry from his older brother Moradi and the prominent local writer Sharaf al-Din Ali. He pursued his studies in Yazd, and then eventually moved to Kashan, a leading hub of literature during the early Safavid era. There he worked as a school-teacher, and through his poems soon gained the interest of the regional governor. Vahshi appears to have been received well by various local poets, who were annoyed of the accolades bestowed on Mohtasham Kashani (died 1588). He soon became involved in the poetic flyting matches that were an important aspect of the literary scene of this period, trading insults with competitors like Fahmi of Kashan and Ghazanfar of Koranjar. It is most likely during this period that Vahshi dedicated qasidas (panegyrics) to Shah Tahmasp I (r. 1524–1576).

During his stay in Kashan, Vahshi visited some other cities in Iran, such as Arak and Jarun, before finally settling in Yazd. Unlike other contemporary Persian poets, Vahshi did not have a strong desire to travel, and thus spent the rest of his life in Yazd and the neighbouring palace-town of Taft. Albeit he occasionally laments his lack of wealth, he appears to have held a distinguished position as the prominent poet at the court of the hereditary rulers of the region, Ghiyat al-Din Mir Miran and his son Khalil-Allah, who were in-laws of the Safavid royal family and traced their descent back to the Sufi shaykh Shah Nimatullah Wali (died 1431).

Vahshi also wrote two brief chronograms on the coronation of Ismail II (r. 1576–1577) and commendation poems to the governors of Kerman, especially Bekhtash Beg Afshar. Nothing suggests that Vahshi ever got married, and he seems to have been reserved by nature. Awhadi of Balyan, who served as Vahshi's literary executor, reported that Vahshi died at the age of 52 at Yazd in 1583 due to a heavy drinking binge. He was buried in the city, which has frequently been damaged due to political unrest.

== Works ==
Vahshi's, Shirin and Farhad, a Persian folklore and romantic story of Sassanid Iran is written in the meter of the Persian poet Nizami's romantic epic Shirin and Farhad. Although the work was left unfinished at the time of Vahshi's death, with the introduction and barely 500 verses of the story completed, it has been recognized as one of the poets most famous masterpieces. Approximately a hundred manuscripts of this famous Persian epic from Vahshi has been catalogued around the world. Two poets from Shiraz, Wesal and Saber, took on the task of completing Vahshi's poem in the 19th century.

Awhadi, the literary executor of Vahshi gathered some 9,000 verses of Vahshi's poetry after his death. They include various Persian forms including Ghazal, Qasida and panegyrics to patrons as well praises of the saints of the time.

== Sources ==
- Losensky, Paul (2004). "Vaḥši Bāfqi". Encyclopaedia Iranica.
- Beers, Theodore S. (2015). "The Biography of Vahshi Bāfqi (d. 991/1583) and the Tazkera Tradition". Journal of Persianate Studies. 8 (2). Brill: 195–222.
- E. G. Browne. Literary History of Persia. (Four volumes, 2,256 pages, and twenty-five years in the writing). 1998. ISBN 0-7007-0406-X
- Jan Rypka, History of Iranian Literature. Reidel Publishing Company. ASIN B-000-6BXVT-K
