= Ali Montazeri =

Iranian public health scientist (born 1958)

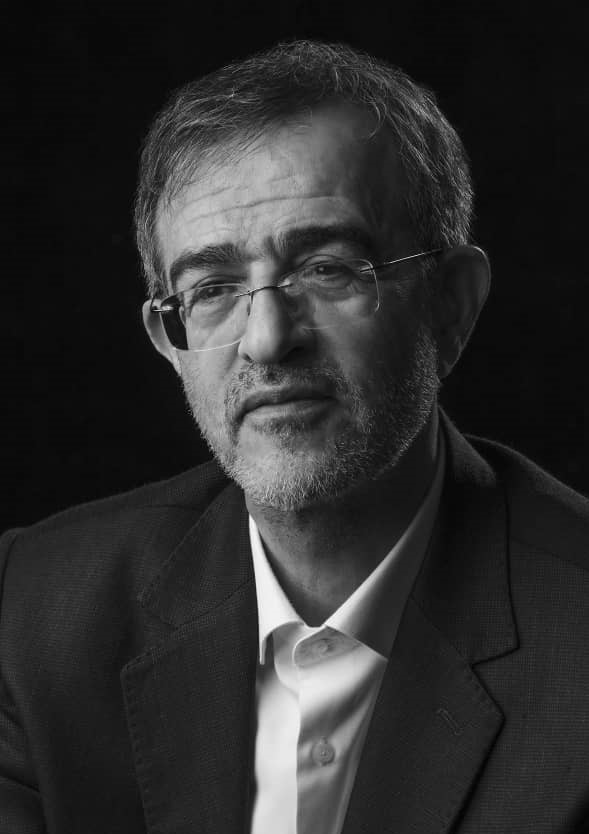
- Iranian public health scientist at the Health Metrics Research Center

President of the Academic Center for Education, Culture and Research (ACECR)
- Incumbent
- Assumed office 8 April 2025; Acting: 16 March – 8 April 2025
- President: Masoud Pezeshkian
- Preceded by: Hassan Moslemi Naeini
- In office 1997–2006
- President: Mohammad Khatami
- Preceded by: Mohammad Rahmati
- Succeeded by: Hamid Reza Tayyebi

Personal details
- Born: September 2, 1958 (age 68) Qom
- Education: University of Glasgow
- Occupation: Sociologist, Politician) Epidemiology and Public Health

Professor Dr. Ali Montazeri (Ali Montazeri Moghaddam, born September 2, 1958) is an Iranian public health scientist at the Health Metrics Research Center of the Iranian Institute for Health Sciences Research. He is editor-in-chief of an Iranian health journal: Payesh (Health Monitor-the journal of Iranian Institute for Health Sciences Research), the associate editor of Health and Quality of Life Outcomes up to Feb. 2024, and academic editor for PLOS One. He has been three times the director of Academic Center for Education, Culture and Research.

== Education ==
Professor Montazeri received his MPH and PhD from University of Glasgow. His PhD thesis concerned the quality of life in lung cancer patients, and was jointly supervised by Charles Gillis and James McEwen.

== Research ==
Montazeri published a paper in 2004 that found knowledge of cancer diagnosis does not change how a person fills out a questionnaire about his or her quality of life. In a 2012 book chapter, he proposed that research be conducted to see how quality of life in people with cancer is affected by the way a cancer diagnosis is disclosed and how the person's level of education affects quality of life.

He also published papers in 2002, 2003, and 2015 about the epidemiology of breast cancer and breast cancer preventive behaviors such as breast self-examination

In 2008 and 2009, he published two reviews of the literature on the quality of life in women with breast cancer which are still receiving considerable attention .

Recently he published an updated review on the quality of life in breast cancer patients and a systematic review of qualitative studies on the topic.

He and his colleagues developed a guideline for reporting bibliometric reviews, namely the BIBLIO. Similar to many guidelines, it provides a checklist for transparency in reporting bibliometric reviews of the literature. Montazeri also contributed to the development of several instruments for measuring health literacy which are available for use with adults — HELIA, adolescents — HELMA, oral health — OHLAQ, and postpartum depression — PoDLiS. In a recent publication, he and his colleagues initiated a comprehensive review of existing measures for health literacy.
