= Fajr International Theater Festival =

Stage festival in Iran

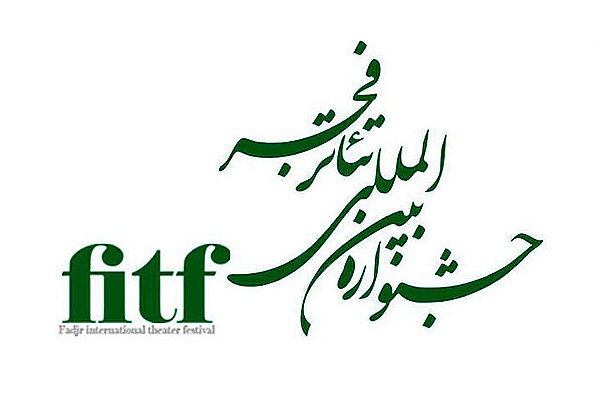

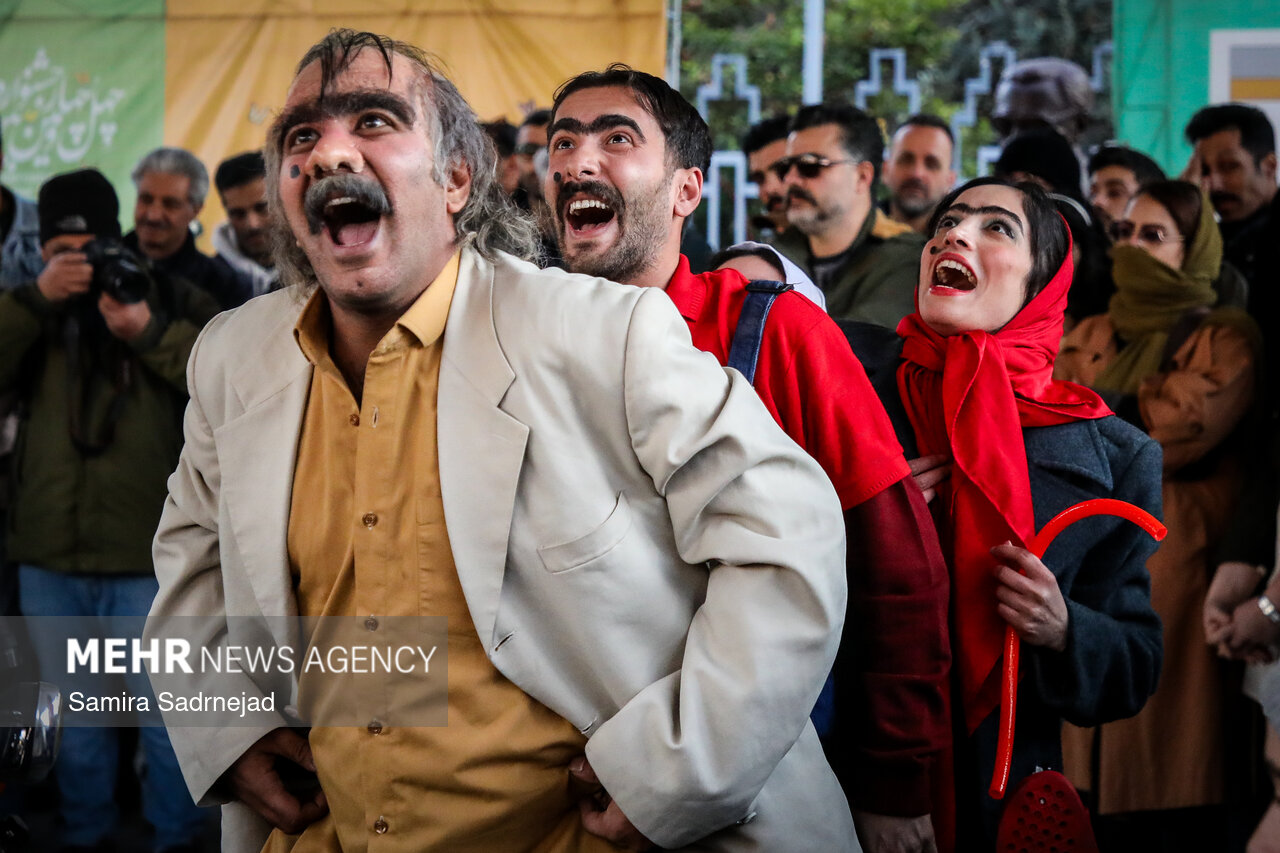
A performance at the festival in 2026

Fajr International Theater Festival (est. 1983) is Iran's most important stage festival which occurs annually in Iran, featuring local and international theatrical works and performers. Among the participants: el-Warsha (Egypt) and Teatro Potlatch (Italy). Some of the events take place in the Tehran City Theater.

This festival has a competitive form and contains different sections including International performances, local staging, playwriting, radio performances, street theater, theater photography, etc.

Ministry of Culture, Performing Arts Center, ITI, Theater Forum, The House of Iranian Artists, etc. are main performers of this international theater festival.

== History ==
=== 1980s ===
The first edition of Fajr International Theater Festival was held from 1st to 11th of February 1983. February 11th marks the date of the victory of the Iranian revolution which is usually the date of the festival's award ceremony. Taha Abde-Khodayi, then head of Dramatic Arts Center under Ministry of Culture, was the director of the first edition.

Second edition of Fajr International Theater Festival was held in February 1984. Again Taha Abde-Khodayi served as its director. The award ceremony was held on February 12. Reza Saberi won the best director award for The Fifth Oppressed and Hossein Nuri won the best playwright award for The Crimson Cloak.

3rd Fajr International Theater Festival was held in February 1985 with Taha Abde-Khodayi as its director for the 3rd consecutive year. Although the festival hadn't adopted the "international" label by then, it hosted foreign works including a play from Iraq. The best playwright award was gained by Mohammad-Reza Zandi for the play Alas and the best director award went to Mostafa Qalandari for the same play.

4th Fajr International Theater Festival was held in February 1986. Taha Abde-Khodayi saved his position as the director of the festival. Khosrow Shakibai won the best director award for the play Playbook of Law.

Fifth edition of Fajr International Theater Festival was regularly held in February 1987. Director of the festival didn't change. Anoushirvan Arjmand received a diploma of honor as best director for The Last Trick and Parviz Arab was awarded as the best playwright for Flip.

6th Fajr International Theater Festival was held in February 1988. After five editions under Taha Abde-Khodayi a new director was assigned who was Ali Montazeri. Salman Farsi Saleh-zehi was awarded as best director for Water, Air, Earth.

7th Fajr International Theater Festival was held in February 1989 having Ali Montazeri as its director for the second year. For the first time it included a section called Movie Plays showcasing some movies based on plays. Grigori Kozintsev's King Lear based on Shakespeare's work was presented in this section.

=== 1990s ===
Eighth edition of Fajr International Theater Festival was held in February 1990 without a change in its director.

9th Fajr International Theater Festival was held in February 1991 with Ali Montazeri as the director in fourth consecutive years. Iranian Association of Theater Critics chose Davood Mir-Bagheri's work Battle in Battle as the best play.

Tenth edition of Fajr International Theater Festival was held in February 1992. Ali Montazeri remained the director. Hasan Hamed was awarded the best playwright for Son of Summer. Golab Adineh was awarded the best director for Beyzai's Death of Yazdgerd. Hossein Nuri received a special jury prize for Beloved.

Eleventh edition of Fajr International Theater Festival was held in February 1993 with a new director, Hossein Jafari. The festival decided to honor all works equally. Among the plays were Hossein Nuri's The Circus and Ali Rafie's Souvenir of the Years of Sand.

12th Fajr International Theater Festival was held in February 1994 with Hossein Farrokhi as its new director. Siavosh Tahmoures won the best play award for Mirbagheri's Battle in Battle. Ezzatolah Entezami was among the jury.

Thirteenth edition of Fajr International Theater Festival was held in February 1995 keeping Hossein Farrokhi as director. Mohammad-Hadi Namvar won the best director award for Stone Meadow. Asghar Farhadi won two awards for his play Car Residents; best actor and best set design.

14th Fajr International Theater Festival was held in February 1996 having Mahmoud Azizi was assigned as its new director. Iraj Rad was among the jury and Amin Zendegani received an acting award for The Burning Red. Chista Yasrebi won the best playwright award for The Burning Red and Hossein Nuri was honored for Intuition.

=== 2020s ===
Mojtaba Rostamifar, became the first director from Khuzestan to win three major awards at the Fajr Theater Festival for his play "Laam" in 2025.
