= Dynamic angiothermography =

Dynamic angiothermography (DATG) is a technique for the diagnosis of breast cancer. This technique, though springing from the previous conception of thermography, is based on a completely different principle. DATG records the temperature variations linked to the vascular changes in the breast due to angiogenesis. The presence, change, and growth of tumors and lesions in breast tissue change the vascular network in the breast. Consequently, through measuring the vascular structure over time, DATG effectively monitors the change in breast tissue due to tumors and lesions. It is currently used in combination with other techniques for diagnosis of breast cancer. This diagnostic method is a low-cost one compared with other techniques.

Angiothermography is not a test that substitutes for other tests, but stands in relation to them as a technique that gives additional information to clarify the clinical picture and improve the quality of diagnosis.

== History ==
In the early 1970s, studies of Professor J. Tricoire in France focused on the application of contact thermography for the screening of breast cancer using plates with liquid crystals. The principle, on which the methodology developed by Tricoire was based, was to record and map the heat generated by possibly emergent tumors. These studies had a unique debut, since the examination was absolutely non-invasive (no radiation or contrast agents are required). The test is performed by putting the thermal detection screen in contact with the breast, allowing time for image formation, and analyzing the resultant image. While some detection of tumors and lesions was demonstrated, the technique also had a propensity for substantial false positives (non-existent cancer diagnosed).

During the time at which contact thermography screening was being practiced, more detailed studies on the change in the breast due to the presence of tumors and lesions were being performed. The connection between breast tumors and vascularization was highlighted and studied in detail by Judah Folkman in his research on angiogenesis which began in 1965. These studies, the more complete description of this process, and the models emergent from this work, earned Folkman the Wolf Prize in Medicine in 1992.

Dynamic angiothermography utilizes thermal imaging, but with important differences from the older kind of thermography, which impact detection performance. First, the probes are much improved over the previous liquid crystal plates; they include better spatial resolution, contrastive performance, and the image is formed more quickly. The more significant difference lies in identifying the thermal changes due to changes in vascular network to support the growth of the tumor or lesion. Instead of just recording the change in heat generated by the tumor, the image is now able to identify changes due to the vascularization of the mammary gland. In order for a tumor to originate, develop and grow, an enhanced blood supply is necessary (angiogenesis theory). The more detailed map of the vascular network contains information pointing to the location where the breast has changed to accommodate the tumor. More importantly, the ability to visualize tumors in a precancerous state enables prompt and strategic removal, which of course removes the cause of the tumor.

The general idea emerging from several clinical studies is that every woman has their own blood pattern image, which is like a fingerprint and, in healthy women, can remain unchanged over time. Changes in this "fingerprint" are evidence of a suspected tumoral or pre-tumoral activity.

== Description ==
The current state of the equipment, by which this examination is done, consists of two parts, and can be combined into a highly mobile footprint. The first component is the thermographic sensor to be placed on the breast. The second is a connection to a computer that records the acquired images. The sensor records the distribution of blood at temperatures between 30 °C and 35 °C. When the sensor is leaning on the breast, the heat, produced by vascularization, induces an image due to the change of the liquid crystal state that passes from solid (black coloured) to liquid. While in the previous contact thermography the doctor studied the colour distribution, in the new methodology (dynamic angiothermography) the image is inspected for information conveyed about local blood distribution. In a healthy breast, the pattern formed by normal vascularization looks like a pointed image in the direction of the nipple. In the case of a tumor, or even of a precancerous lesion, the pattern appears to have rounded shapes which converge from different areas of the breast to feed the tumor. The images can be interpreted visually by the doctor, and/or evaluated with the aid of digital image enhancement tools. Future possibilities extend to more automated detection using computer-aided inspection. The standard procedure is that the doctor looks examines the patient clinically (with palpation) and then acquires two projections of the right breast (side and front) and two of the left (side and front). Digital photos are also acquired and these results are compared with other pictures previously acquired. In the case of evident superficial veins, the breast must be cooled with a current of cold air.

== Comparison with other techniques ==
Comparative diagnostic exams of reference for the cancer of the breast are mammography (the "gold" standard), ultrasounds, and for 3D imaging, nuclear magnetic resonance or recently developed approaches to CT of the breast.

DATG is not a test that directly substitutes for other tests, but stands in relation to them as a technique that provides a detailed and non-invasive look at the changes in blood flow in the breast. As such, it has been most successfully employed in combination with other tests to improve the quality of the diagnosis. Further, it may be the most non-invasive technique possible for performing early screening.

Mammography measures the differences of the tissue density inside the breast with substantial spatial resolution but requires at least a low dose of radiation. In many cases the tumors or lesions are directly imaged with respect to size and shape. Image interpretation for mammograms is mature and can be effective. However, there are concerns that the higher density of breast tissue in patients younger than 40–45 years of age degrades the diagnostic information obtained in this technique. Some studies have shown that mammography is less effective before age 50. It is also difficult to see precancerous lesions with mammography, which have not emerged into localized density changes imaged by the low dose of radiation.

Ultrasound inspections can be applied to women of any age and do not involve the use of radiation. Further, ultrasound techniques can measure the size of the tumor and are able to differentiate solids from liquids in breast tissue. However, due to the general equality in acoustic impedance for many types of structures in the breast, ultrasound imaging detects many abnormalities or potential sites that are false positives, limiting its usefulness. Doppler ultrasound can provide some information on blood flow in the breast, but this is a substantial variation on regular ultrasound inspections. Overall, ultrasound techniques are best employed to evaluate a lump discovered by some other means and/or to investigate a specific site identified by mammography.

Nuclear magnetic resonance (NMR) scanning, as DATG does, can map the blood flow distribution in the breast, and provides information for patients of all ages. However, this technique is most effective with the use of a contrast agent that is mildly invasive, with some risk of a negative reaction. Compared to DATG, these scans require substantial facilities and the scanning and interpretation is considerably more expensive.

Breast CT scanning employs penetrating radiation and so includes some x-ray dose delivered to the patient. Unlike in mammography, the breast is not flattened or manipulated to equalize the contrast. Instead, gravity is used and the breast hangs down into the source detector envelope. For the same dose delivered in mammography, breast CT produces 3D volumetric images of tumors and lesions that can show the connection to the vascular network. Further, these images can be evaluated with the same image analysis tools resident for general CT imaging. As in the case of NMR, the hardware footprint of this type of scanning is more substantial than DATG.

Dynamic angiothermography (DATG) is a technique that does not require ionizing radiation or toxic contrast agents, can be used on patients of all ages, has good specificity and is able to diagnose even precancerous lesions while it is not able to measure the size of a tumor or lesion.

== Advantages and disadvantages ==
DATG is able to detect changes in blood flow that are indicative of breast cancer, may be used for younger patients, is non-invasive (no need for radiation or contrast agent, no need for compression of the breast) and is lower-cost than alternatives requiring minimal facilities. This technology, performed quickly (5–6 minutes for visit) and very precise, is useful for screening and is also able to detect precancerous lesions. Studies have been conducted that have shown how it is possible, by means of this methodology, to diagnose invasive ductal carcinoma and infiltrating lobular carcinoma with the same accuracy. DATG can be strategic for young patients, or patients with dense breasts where the contrastive performance of mammography is challenged. Another application of DATG is the monitoring of at-risk patients with increased changes of breast cancer who take hormone replacement therapy (sometimes taken to reduce menopause symptoms) and participate in in-vitro fertilization.

By contrast DATG is not able to determine the size of the tumor. Rather, the diagnostic information from DATG indicates the presence of a suspicious lesion and points to the area where to look for it. In fact, the intensity and the size of the features in the image acquired by DATG are not correlated to the shape and size of the tumor but to its underlying biological activity (see angiogenesis described above). Lastly, the interpretation of DATG images can be done either by a radiologist, surgeon, oncologist, gynecologist or simply by a medical professional after explicit training to evaluate the DATG images.
