= Nadia Maftouni =

Iranian artist and philosopher (born 1966)

- نادیا مفتونی
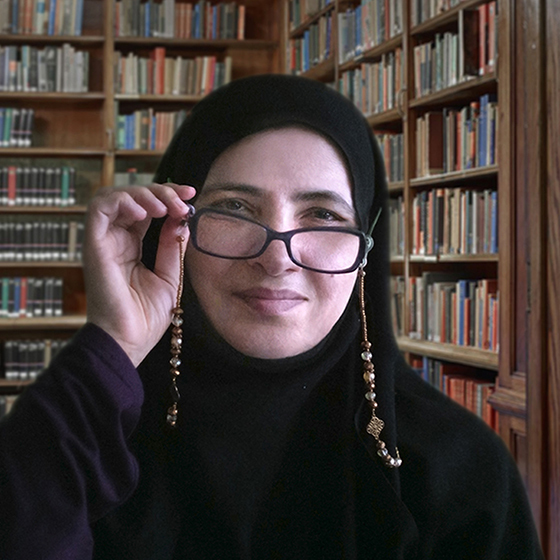
- Born: 14 January 1966 (age 60); Tehran, Iran
- Spouse: Hossein Nuri
- Children: 2

Education
- Education: NODET; Sharif University of Technology; Ferdowsi University of Mashhad; University of Tehran

Philosophical work
- Era: 21st-century philosophy
- Region: Islamic philosophy
- Institutions: University of Tehran; Yale Law School
- Website: maftouni.ir

Nadia Maftouni (Persian: نادیا مفتونی, born 14 January 1966) is an Iranian academic, philosophical author and artist. She is best known as a leading Researcher on Farabian, Avicennian and Suhrawardian philosophy with her modern reading of their works. She is also an established researcher in Jurisprudence and Islamic History. She is a professor at the University of Tehran, where she is an alumna and a member of the department of Philosophy and Islamic Theology. She is a Senior Research Scholar at Yale Law School and she is on the board of History of Philosophy Quarterly. She is also famous for proposing to Iranian artist Hossein Nuri when he was already in a wheelchair.

== Early life ==
As a teenager, she became one of NODET's select students in the second year of its foundation. She was enrolled at Sharif University of Technology and started studying Applied physics.

== Marriage ==
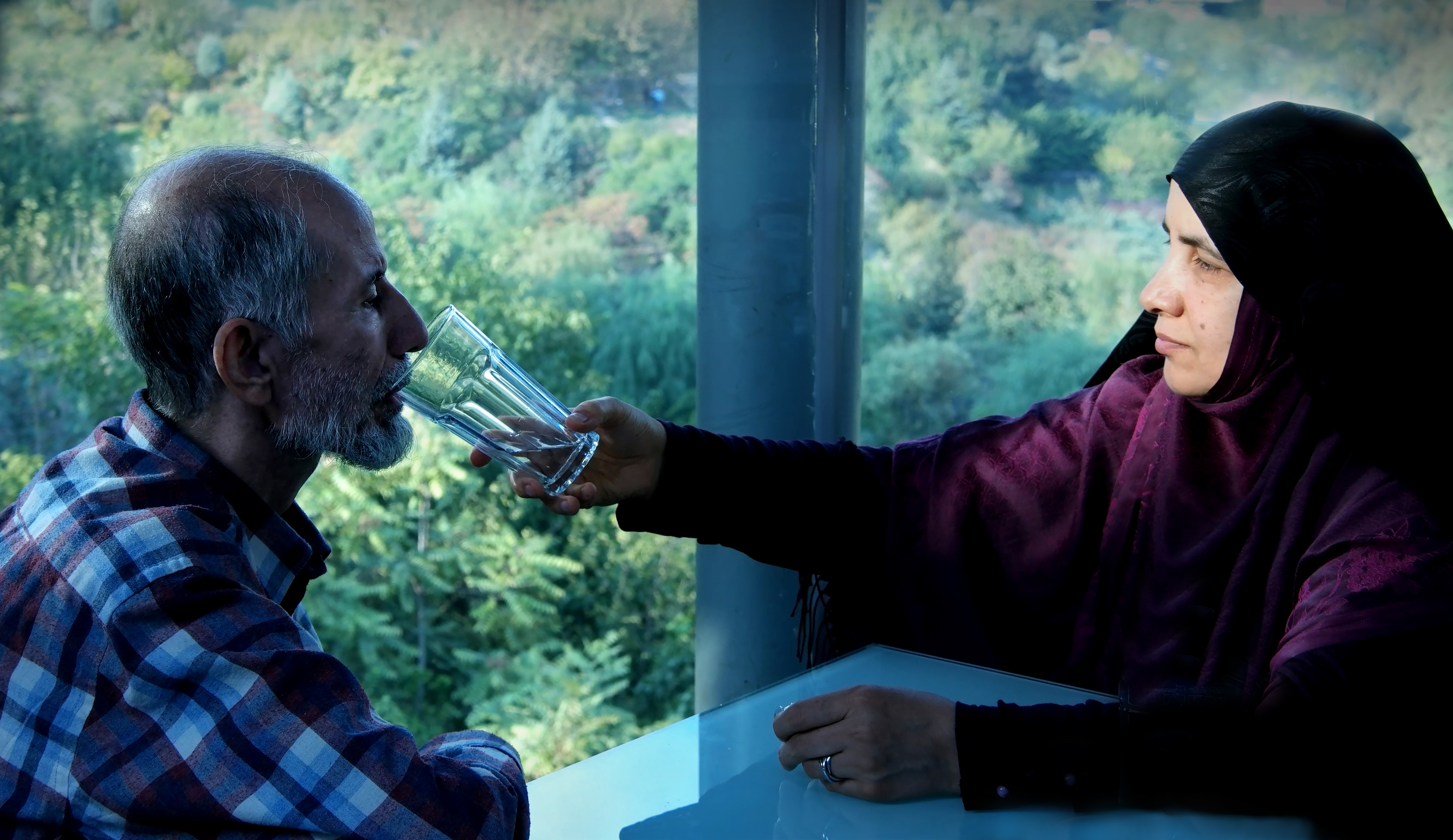
Hossein Nuri and Nadia Maftouni

Maftouni first saw Hossein Nuri as he was invited to hold a speech at Sharif. Nuri was already using a wheelchair as a result of being tortured in 1972 for writing a political satire. Maftouni being captivated by his words, fell in love with him and proposed to him. She left her studies and family to live with Nuri who was then residing in the border town of Torbat-e Jam. It was there that she gave birth to two sons. A few years later they moved to Mashhad and then to Tehran.

== Academic career ==
In 1999, Maftouni applied for Philosophy at Ferdowsi University of Mashhad. A year later, she transferred to University of Tehran as the family moved to Tehran. She finished her studies there holding a B.A., an M.A., and a PhD in Philosophy and Islamic Theology and became a member of the Department of Philosophy. She is also a Senior Research Scholar at Yale University. Moreover, she is on the board of History of Philosophy Quarterly.

== Artistic career ==
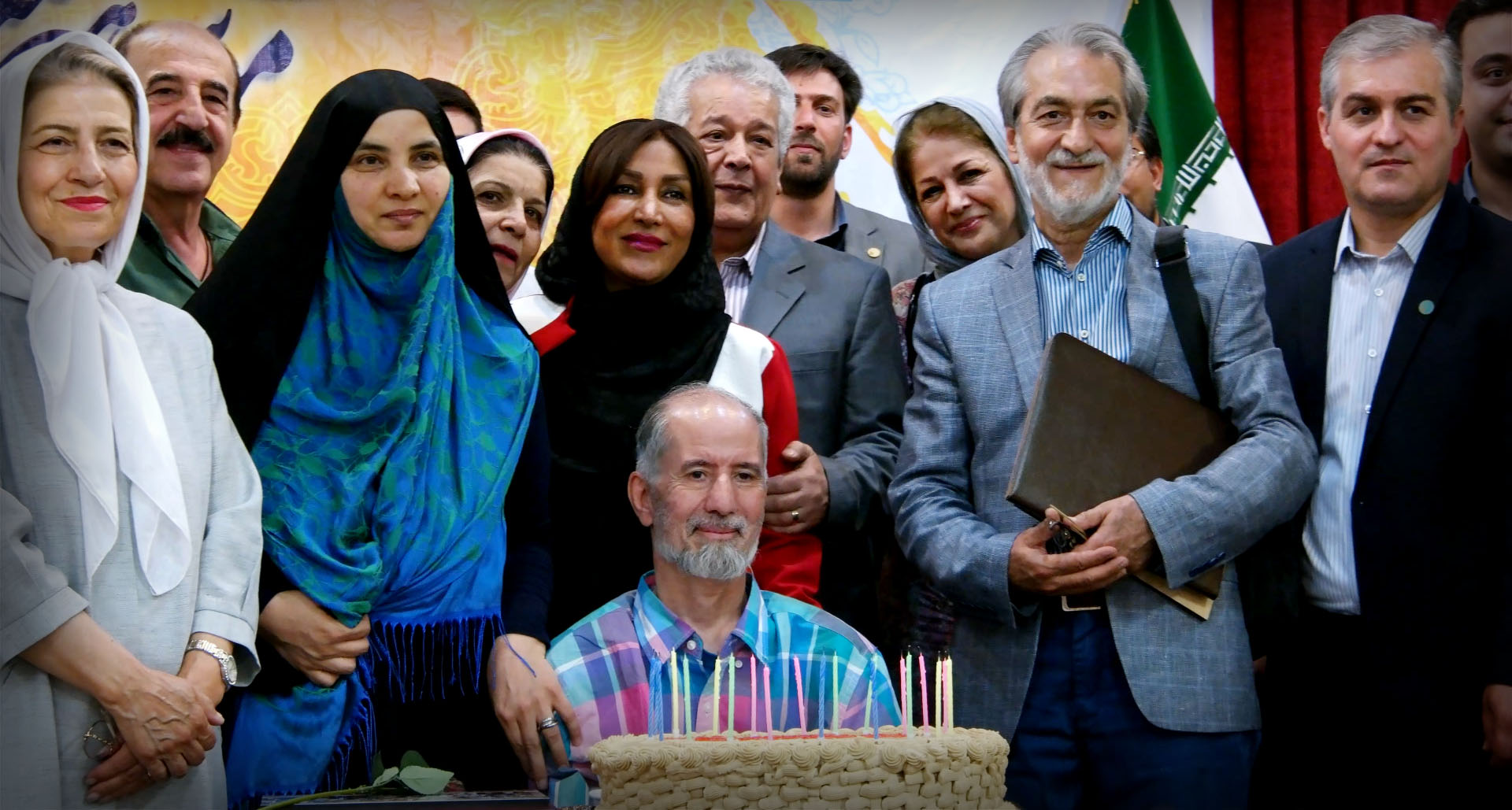
Hossein Nuri, Nadia Maftouni, Reza Fayazi, Majid Entezami and some other members of Society for Iranian Prominent Artists.

Maftouni learned painting from Nuri and held many exhibitions of her artworks along with Nuri. In 2004 and 2010 the couple had two exhibitions in Paris. In 2005 they displayed their works in Beijing and two years later in Berlin. In 2008 they went to Algiers for their next exhibition and Beirut was their following stop in 2010. The same year Vienna was host to their paintings.

== Publications ==
=== Selected articles ===
- Explanation of Diversity and Its Role in Farabi's Utopia, Biannual Journal of Avicinian Philosophy, Vol. 38, 2008.
- A Comparative Study of Revelation and Prophecy according to Farabi and Ibn Sina, Biannual Journal of Avicinian Philosophy, Vol. 39, 2008.
- Peripatetic Imagination, Ishraqi Imagination and Creativity, Kheradname-ye Sadra, Vol. 55, 2009.
- Ibn Sina's Inner Perception in the Symbolic Treatises of Suhrawardi, Biannual Journal of Avicinian Philosophy, Vol. 41, 2009.
- Art as Cultural Strategy in Farabi's Thought, Strategy of Culture, Vol. 10–11, 2012.
- Evaluating Imaginal Forms from Farabi's Point of View, Ma’rifat-i Falsafi, Vol. 32, 2011.
- Ethical Evaluation of the Subject of Artworks, Conference of Professional ethics in Civilization of Iran and Islam, 2007.
- Position of Artist in Farabi's Politics, Conference of Farabi and Construction of Islamic Philosophy, 2010.
- Art As It Is, and Art As It Should Be: An Analytical Study of Farabi, Transcendent Philosophy, Vol. 13, 2012.
- Suhrawardi's Viewpoint on Human's Progressive Motion (N. Maftouni, M. Nuri) Pazhuhesh Name-e Akhlaq, Vol. 25, Autumn 2014.
- Panamatorism according to Ibn Sina and Suhrawardi, Biannual Journal of Avicinian Philosophy, Vol. 48, Autumn and Winter 2012.
- Foundations and Consequences of Suhrawardi’s Theory of Imagination, Falsafe va Kalame Eslami, Vol. 5, Spring and Summer 2013.
- Conceptualization of Aesthetics according to Farabi, Kheradname-ye Sadra, Vol. 68, Summer 2012.
- The Relationship between Thought and Imagination: A Case Study of Suhrawardi's Tale of Occidental Exile (N. Maftouni, M. Nuri) Philosophy and Children, Vol. 1/4, Winter 2014.
- The Ladder-Like Process of Thinking and Imagination in Farabi's Viewpoint (N. Maftouni, M. Nuri) Philosophy and Children, Vol. 2/3, Autumn 2014.

=== Selected books ===
- Farabi, Imagination and Artistic Creativity, Tehran, Sureh, 2010.
- Art Ethics according to Farabi, Tehran, Cinema Foundation of Farabi, 2012.
- Research in the Mirror of Ethics, Tehran, Khane Ketab, 2013.
- Philosophy of Science according to Philosophers of the Islamic Era, Tehran, Sorush, 2014.
- Farabi and Philosophy of Utopian Art, Tehran, Sorush, 2014.
- Farabi and Conceptualization of Utopian Art, Tehran, Sureh, 2014.
- Images of Illumination, Tehran, Vaya, 2015.
- Philosophy on Stage: Dramosophy of Hossein Nuri's Plays, Qom, Majnun, 2016.
