= University of Science and Culture =

Private university in Tehran, Iran

Coordinates: 35.74910°N 51.33412°E

- دانشگاه علم و فرهنگ
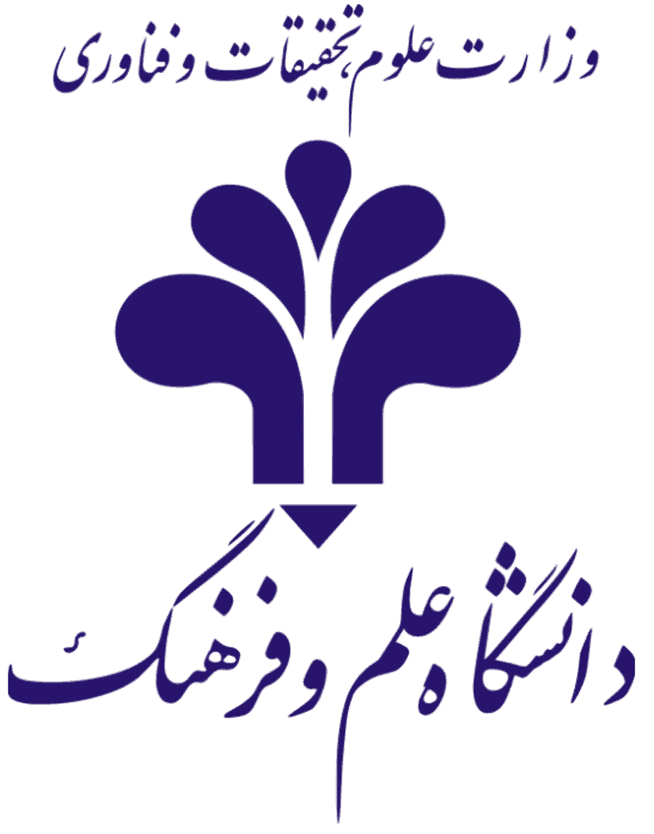
- Type: Public Non-profit
- Established: 1994
- Accreditation: MSRT
- Affiliations: ACECR
- Academic staff: 370
- Students: 9,000
- Location: Tehran, Tehran, Iran
- Website: en.usc.ac.ir

The University of Science and Culture (Persian: دانشگاه علم و فرهنگ, Daneshgah Elm va Farhang) is a public non-profit university located in Tehran, Iran. University of Science and Culture (USC) is a research institution comprising a college of engineering, science and art, offering undergraduate and postgraduate studies.

== History ==
The USC was founded in 1994 as a non-governmental university by Iranian Academic Center for Education, Culture and Research (ACERC) with a special permit by Ministry of Science, Research and Technology, Iran. The first name of this university was Jahad Daneshgahi Higher Education Institute (division 2 of AmirKabir).

== Academics ==
USC has 105 full-time faculty members, approximately 400 part-time faculty members and a student body of approximately 9,000.

In domestic courses, the university admits top students who pass national entrance examinations (called concours) in 20 undergraduate programs, six graduate programs and 15 technical courses. The USC is active in education through its faculties in engineering technology, humanities, and arts.

=== Bachelor's programs ===
- Law
- Software Engineering
- Electrical Engineering
- Civil engineering
- Statistics
- Management
- Industrial Engineering
- Accounting
- Architecture
- Painting
- Photography
- Graphics
- Computer Engineering
- Fabric and Clothing
- Psychology
- Safety engineering
- Molecular and Cell Biology
- Microbiology
- Biotechnology

=== Master's programs ===
- Civil Engineering-Water and Hydraulic Structures Engineering
- Civil Engineering-Structural Engineering
- Civil Engineering-Earthquake Engineering
- Financial Engineering
- Industrial Engineering
- Law
- MBA-Strategic
- Art Research
- Clinical Psychology
- Eco-tourism
- Cultural Studies
- Geography-Tourism Planning
- Molecular And Cell Biology
- Electrical Engineering-Power Electronics & Electrical machines
- Computer Engineering - Software Engineering
- Computer Engineering - Artificial Intelligence
- Computer Engineering - Data Science

=== Doctoral (Ph.D.) programs ===
- Civil Engineering-Structural Engineering
- Biology
- Law
- Clinical Psychology
- Tourism Management

== Board of education ==
The university benefits from 105 full-time members of the board of education in its faculties.

== Mission of the USC ==
The following objectives and programs are approved by the board of trustees of the USC.

== Campuses ==
The university's main campus is in Tehran's west district; additional campuses are in Isfahan, Rasht, Hamedan, Tehran and Kashmar. There are two building complexes at the USC. In addition to the library facilities, the USC is connected to information banks.

The research activities at USC are done at the related research centers which consist of Ruyan Research Institute, Technology Development Institute, Culture and Art Institute, and Social Studies and Humanities Institute. The Department of Research at USC is responsible for helping students and board members research, especially postgraduate students.

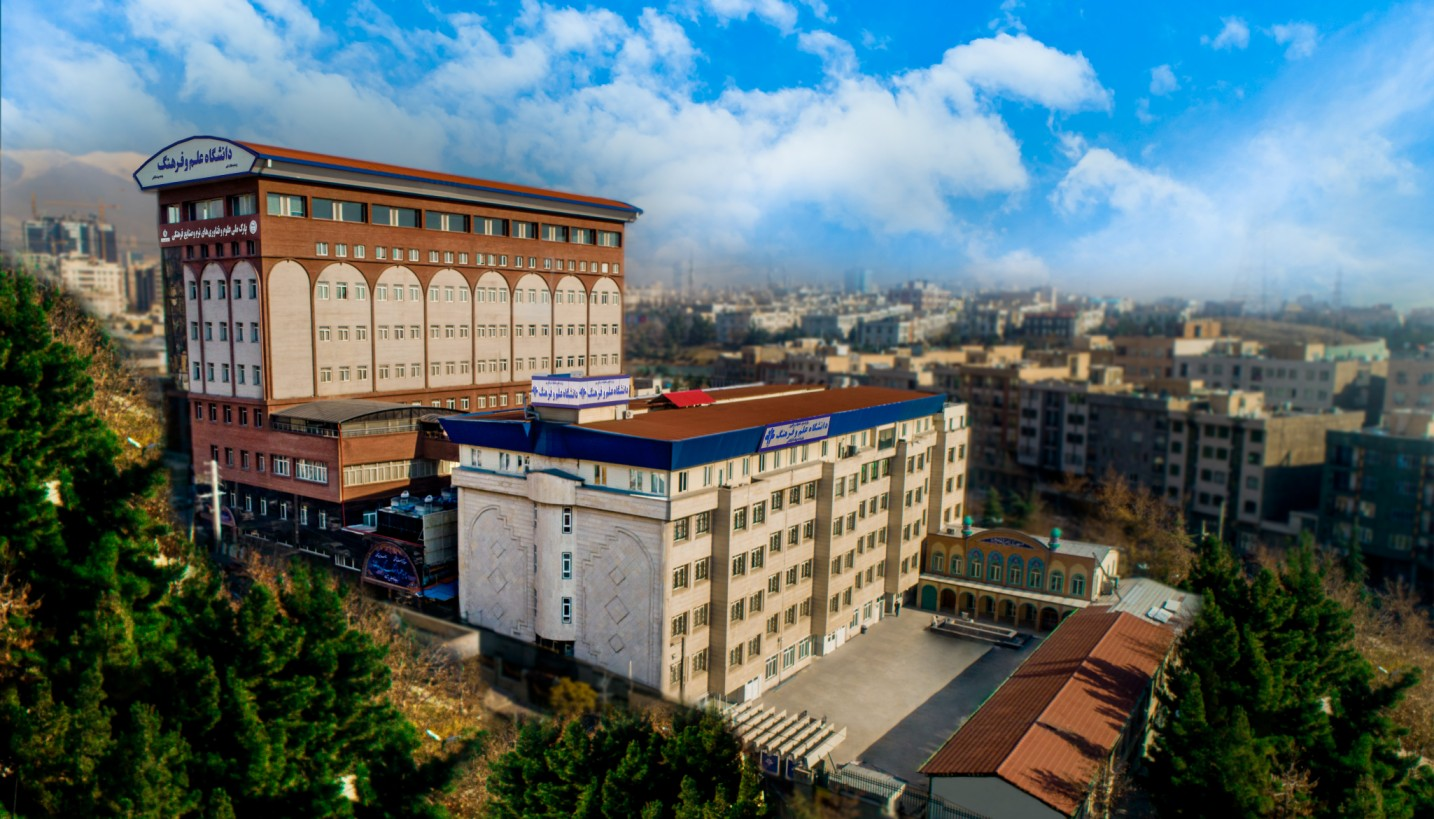
USC main campus building
