= Academic Center for Education, Culture and Research =

Iranian higher education institution

- جهاد دانشگاهی; Jahād-e Dāneshgāhi

Agency overview
- Formed: 1980; 46 years ago
- Headquarters: Tehran, Iran
- Agency executive: Ali Montazeri, President
- Parent agency: Supreme Council of the Cultural Revolution
- Child agencies: Avicenna Research Institute; Royan Institute; ACECR Humanities and Social Sciences Research Institute; University of Science and Culture; Iranian Institute for Health Sciences Research
- Website: acecr.ac.ir

The Academic Center for Education, Culture and Research (ACECR) (Persian: جهاد دانشگاهی) is an Iranian public and non-governmental higher education institution established in 1980.

== Mission ==
ACECR engages in research and development projects in different fields of science and technology and real-world applications. Its activities can be broadly divided into the areas of: research and technology, education, cultural activities, and entrepreneurship.

== Funding ==
Only 20% of ACECR's funding comes from national budget, while the majority of its funding is derived from partnerships and cooperation with the private sector.

== Staffing ==
ACECR has 680 full-time research and academic staff, and 1,600 full-time research assistants. Its activities are supported by 2,100 services and administrative staff. Industry experts and post graduate research students also contribute to projects on a part-time basis.

== Achievements ==
- 2006: Iran's first cloned sheep, named Royana, Royan Institute
- 2015: A new formulation of anti-breast cancer drug Herceptin using a bacterial method by researchers led by Keyvan Majdzadeh produced
- 2017: The first transgenic zebrafish models in Iran, Royan Institute
