= Hossein Nuri =

Iranian artist and filmmaker

- حسین نوری
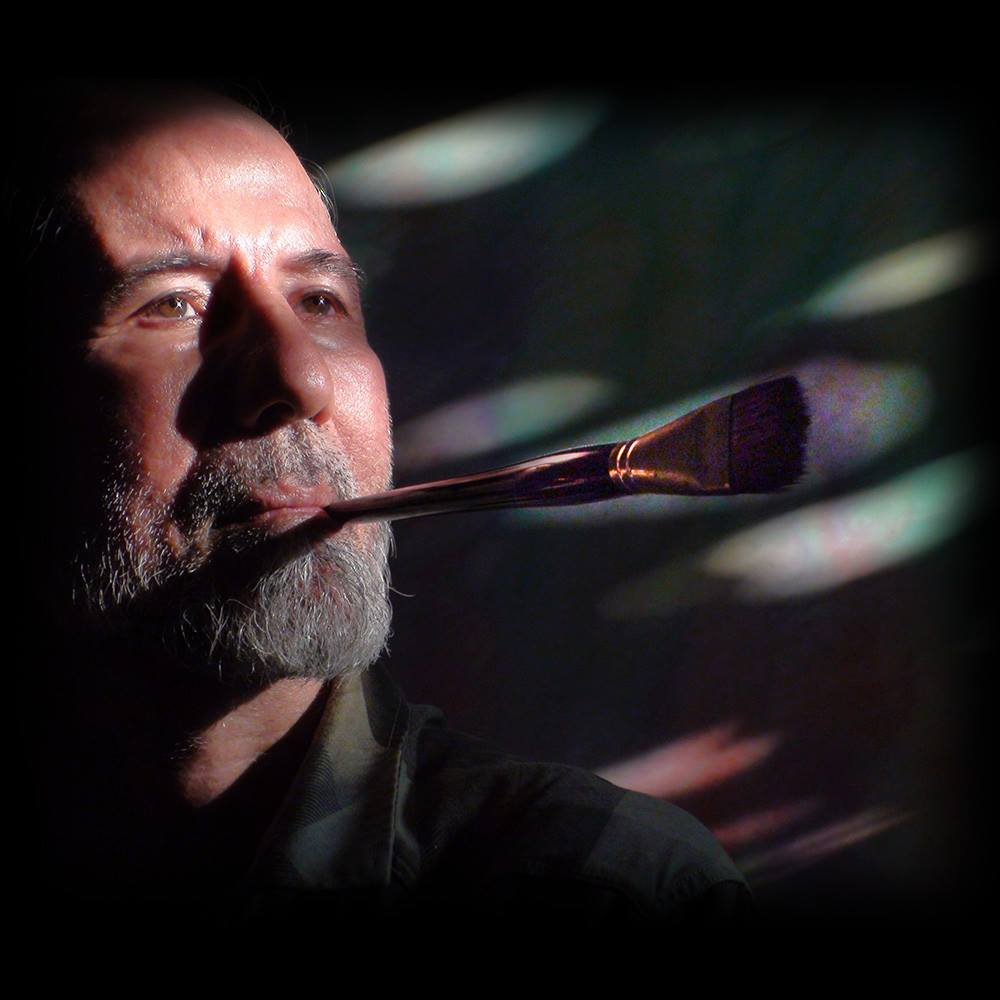
- Nuri in 2014
- Born: Gholam Hossein Nuri Nekah; 1 July 1954 (age 72); Mashhad, Khorasan, Iran
- Occupations: Painter, playwright, filmmaker
- Spouse: Nadia Maftouni
- Children: 2
- Website: www.nurigallery.com

Hossein Nuri (also spelled Hosein Noori or Hussein Nouri) (Persian: حسین نوری, born 1 July 1954) is an Iranian painter, playwright and film director. One of Nuri's pre-eminent characteristics is that despite his physical limitations he has gained professional acclaim in three fields of painting, theater, and cinema.

== Early life ==
Hossein Nuri was born on the first of July 1954 in Mashhad, Iran. He lost his father at the age of three and, despite all the difficulties, his mother raised him along with his brother who was a year older than him. He showed his talent in painting in specialized painting classes at elementary school. After finishing elementary school in Mashhad, he gained a scholarship to continue studies at Farah Industrial Boarding School in Tehran.

== Torture and disability ==
Farah Industrial Boarding School was closely monitored by SAVAK, Iran's pre-revolution secret service. In 1972, Nuri wrote a play which was a political satire criticizing the system and defending human rights. Minutes after the play was staged, it was interrupted by military forces present at the school. Nuri was tortured severely by SAVAK, lost the ability to move his hands and legs, and his internal health started to deteriorate. He was sent to a hospital while he was still imprisoned by SAVAK. Finally as a result of severe damage to Nuri's body, SAVAK released him and he came back to his family who were then residing at Torbat-e Jam. Nuri continued painting by holding the brush with his mouth and uses a wheelchair.

== Marriage ==
After the revolution, Nuri again decided to write plays and staged them in different cities. In a speech he made for the students of Sharif University of Technology, Nadia Maftouni, who was a student of Applied physics, fell in love with Nuri and proposed to him. Nuri accepted and she left her studies to live with Nuri in Torbat-e Jam. They have two sons; Abolfazl Nuri and Mahmoud Nuri. Later, they moved to Mashhad, and afterwards to Tehran.

== Painting style ==
In 2004, Nuri introduced his new style of painting in an exhibition he held in Paris. It was based on the painter's intention to create a certain design out of an abstract process. The outcome was a combination of improvisation and calculated design. French painters suggested the name "Reflection" (Réflexion) for the style, which Nuri approved. Nuri does this process with materials such as oil-color and acrylic on large canvas and particularly the large scale of his works is one of his contributions to abstract painting. The use of bright colors and recurrence of butterflies are other characteristics of his style. Many of Nuri's works in the Reflection style are diptychs in which one side reflects the other. During four decades, Nuri has displayed his paintings in more than a hundred individual exhibitions in multiple cities of Iran and in capitals of France, China, Germany, Algeria, Lebanon, and Austria.

== Theatrical career ==
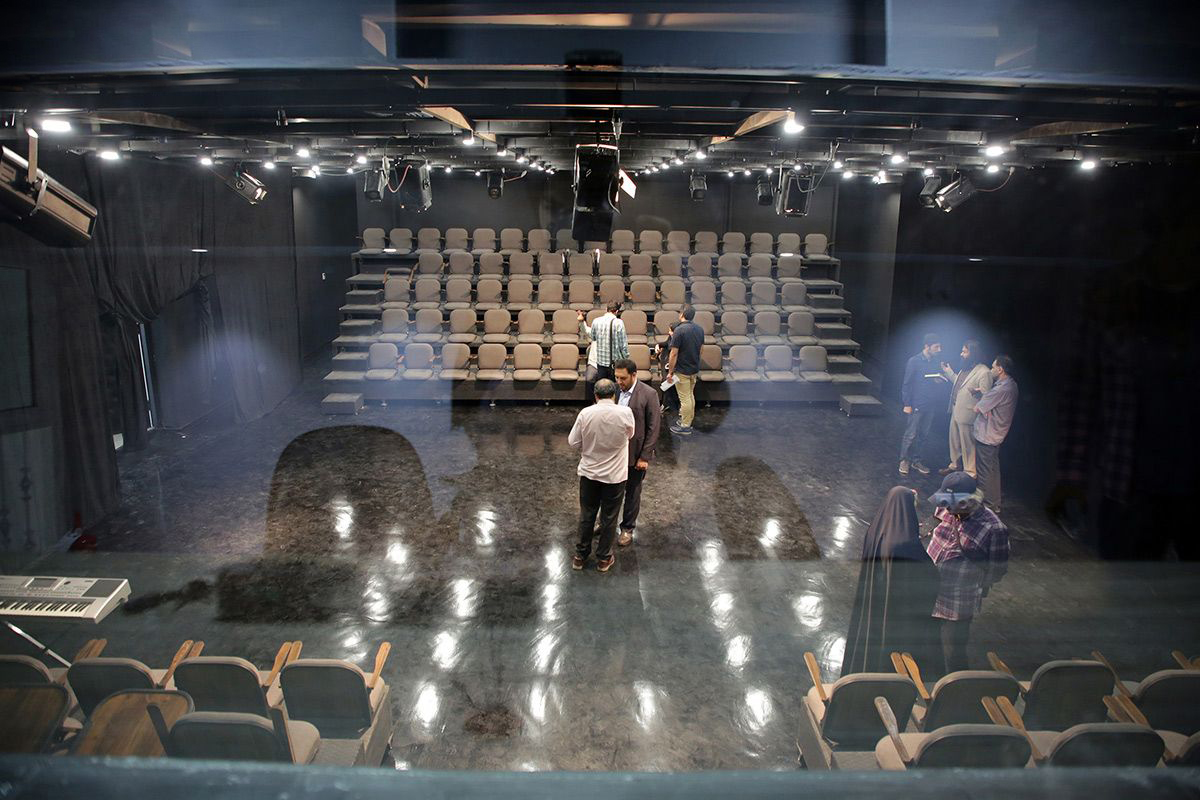
Maestro Hossein Nuri Theater

Nuri's theatrical career was revived after the revolution and it wasn't ever secondary to his painting career. In the 80s and 90s He wrote and staged several award-winning plays including The Purgatory Stop (1981), The Crimson Cloak (1982), The Last Festival (1983), The Circus (1985), Companion (1990), Beloved (1991), Intuition (1994), and The Seeker (1996). As an established character in Iranian theater history, a theater in city of Mashhad, which is one of Iran's theatrical poles, was named after him as Ustad Hossein Nuri Theater.

Theatrical Awards and Accolades for Hossein Nuri
Year	Event	Award/Accolade	Title
1984	Fajr II International Theater Festival	Best Play	Crimson Cloak
1992	Fajr X International Theater Festival	Best Play	Beloved
1993	Fajr XI International Theater Festival	Commended Play	The Circus
1994	Defense I International Playwrights Festival	Commended Play	Intuition
1996	Fajr XIV International Theater Festival	Commended Play	Intuition
2001	Defense Theater Festival 2001	Best Play	Companion
2002	Defense Theater Festival 2002	Best Play	The Seeker
2003	Dialogue Among Civilizations center	Special Recognition	For Lifetime Achievements
2004	Fajr XXIII International Theater Festival	Special Recognition	For Lifetime Achievements
2009	Fajr XXVII International Theater Festival	Special Recognition	For Lifetime Achievements
2020	Opening of a theater (building) in his name: Maestro Hossein Nuri Theater		
2024	Fajr XLII International Theater Festival	Equivalent PhD Degree in Playwriting	

Main Stage Projects with Nuri's Involvement
Year	Title	Playwright	Director	Venue	Ref.
1981	Monastery of the Magi	Yes	Yes	Red Crescent Theater	
1982	The Purgatory Stop	Yes	No	City Theater of Tehran	
1983	The Crimson Cloak	Yes	No	Vahdat Hall	
1985	Rattlesnake	No	Yes	City Theater of Tehran	
1985	The Last Festival	Yes	No	Molavi Theater	
1991	Companion	Yes	No	City Theater of Tehran	
1992	Beloved	Yes	Yes	Molavi Theater	
1992	Borrowed Land	Yes	Yes	Molavi Theater	
1993	The Circus	Yes	Yes	Molavi Theater	
1995	Witnesses	Yes	Yes	City Theater of Tehran	
2002	The Seeker	Yes	Yes	Molavi Theater	

== Television and cinema ==
Nuri directed several documentaries and television programs in the 80s and 90s. In early 2000s he directed some of his plays for television including The Last Festival, The Circus, Beloved, Intuition, and The Seeker. He was co-writer of the Saint Mary project of which a movie version was primarily released in theaters in 2000 and later the extended TV version was televised on multiple global networks and became a hit.

In 2019 Nuri wrote and directed the feature film My Arms Flew which was based on some actual events in his life. The film was screened and awarded in festivals and events in Iran, India, Germany, Italy, US, and Canada. After the screening of the film at Simon Fraser University of Canada, Patricia Gruben said: "I saw many things the second time that I had not understood on first viewing. The way it works with narrative is fascinating. I very much liked the visual construction of mise-en-abyme, where an image is inside another image, as with the dirt-bike footage and the cats in the window, and the paintings themselves. Also the dialectic between anger and spiritual beauty — the anger expressed in those violent paintings and suggested in the struggle to get off the floor, and in the brief cruelty of the cat against her kitten. And yet the ethereal beauty of the paintings, and of both Hossein and Nadia's faces, transcends that violence. It's really a wonderful film, and beautifully shot."

Nuri has been a juror in multiple theater and film festivals. He was a jury member in the first edition of Cinema and Women Film Festival in Iran in 1995. After his film's success, Nuri has served as a jury member in various editions of Jaipur International Film Festival and New Delhi International Film Festival. He was a juror in Resistance International Film Festival in 2020 and a program director in Red Rock Film Festival in 2024.

== Virgin Mary painting ==
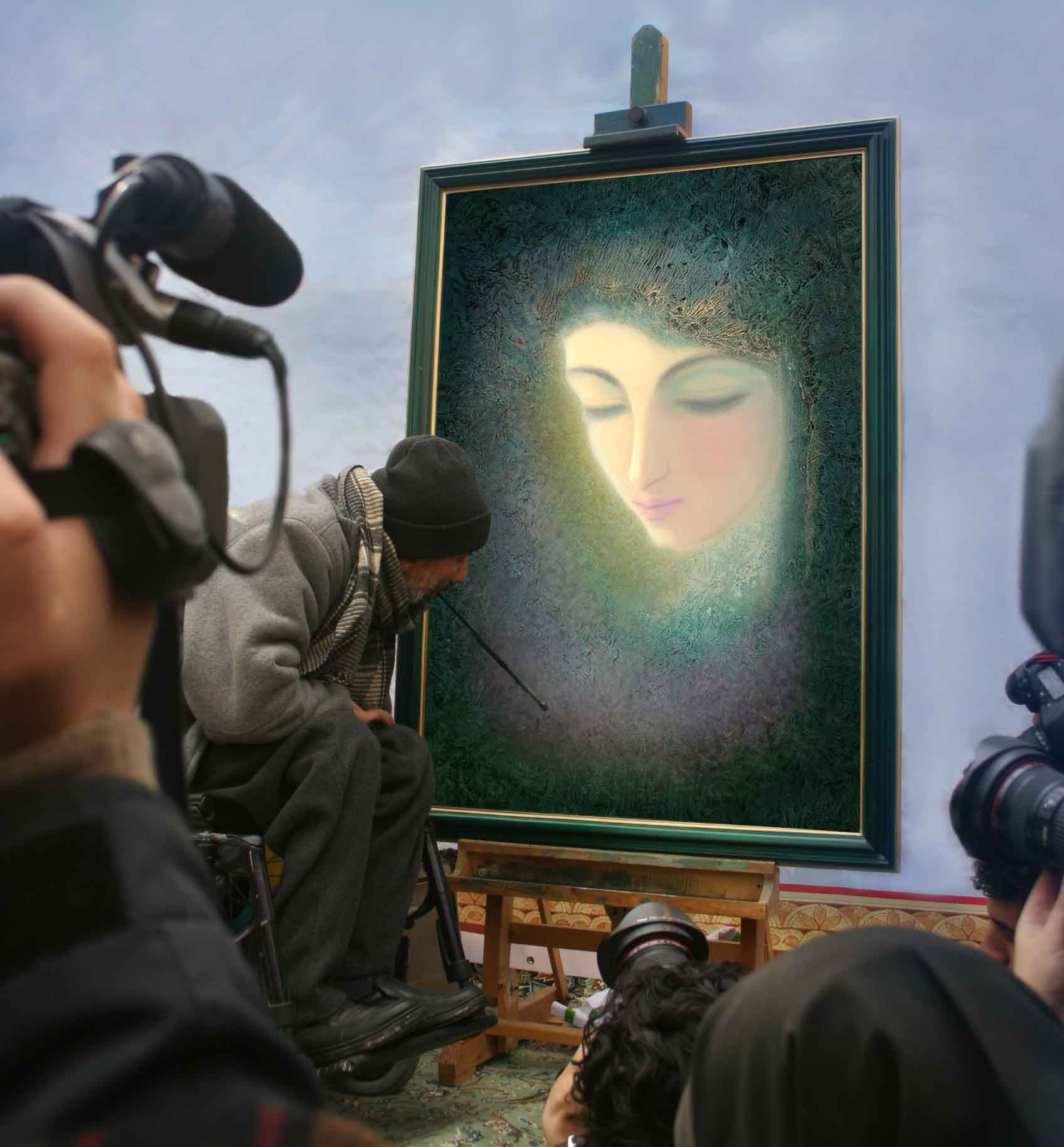
Hossein Nuri in front of the Danish embassy in Tehran

In February 2006 during the protests against Jyllands-Posten cartoons of Prophet Muhammad, Nuri brought his aesthetic depiction of Virgin Mary in front of the Danish embassy in Tehran and expressed his protest in a peaceful way "to respond to ugliness with beauty" as he put it. The incident was instantly reflected locally and globally. The day after, it was on the front page of four Iranian newspapers, Jame Jam, Tehran Times, Sarmayeh, and Asrar. Reuters and DHA were present at the scene, and CNN covered it in an extended report. Besides the primary impact, it engendered further comments by scholars and activists in the following years. Linda Sartor of Saint Mary's College of California referred to the incident in her book about her journey to East Asia. Ian Linden, Professor of Religious Studies at SOAS who teaches on Christian-Muslim relations said: "When there was a demonstration in front of the Danish Embassy in protest against the cartoons negatively caricaturing the Prophet Muhammad, an artist, who had lost the use of both arms, had managed while holding the paint brush in his teeth, to create a beautiful painting of Mary. He displayed the image and asked a question: This is our faith. What is yours?" Geraldine Smyth of Trinity College Dublin said: "I think it's a very strong political statement to confront the ugliness with the beauty. It also conveys another face of Islam that has not to do with violence and burning embassies. There are other ways of answering violence and I think this more powerful way, because it disarms people."

== Recognition ==
Slavoj Žižek mentioned Nuri in the final part of an academic talk with Nadia Maftouni. As he was close to tears he said: "And incidentally, I know this will appear very low, but I mean it so sincerely... It made me cry when I read about this. Listen Nadia! Sincerely all the best to your husband."

== See also ==
- Persian Art
- Cinema of Iran
- List of Iranian artists
- List of Iranian film directors
- Islamic Art
