= Chista Yasrebi =

Iranian university lecturer, playwright and translator (born 1968)

Chista Yasrebi چیستا یثربی
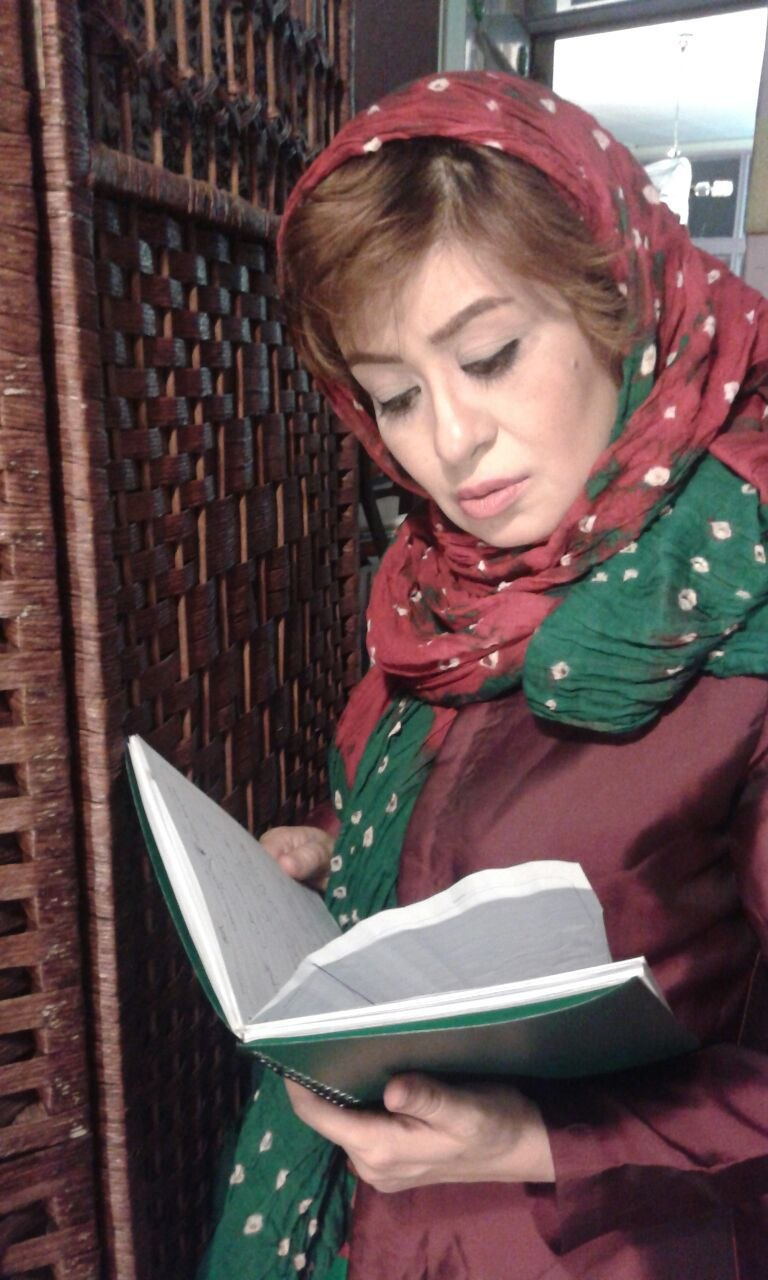
- Chista Yasrebi
- Born: 20 October 1968 (age 58); Tehran, Iran
- Occupations: playwright, university lecturer, translator, literary critic, publisher

Chista Yasrebi (Persian: چیستا یثربی; born 20 October 1968,Tehran, Iran) is an Iranian playwright, translator, literary critic, publisher and university lecturer,

== Early life and education ==
Chista Yasrebi (born 20 October 1968, Tehran) is an Iranian writer, playwright, translator, and critic. She holds bachelor's and master's degrees in psychology from Alzahra University and received a PhD in psychology from the University of Toronto in 2004. Her work includes short stories, plays, screenplays, and novels, including The Mailman.

Yasrebi has conducted university workshops and taught academic courses. She was recognized for teaching the course "Characterology" at Arak University of Theatre. She is also a permanent member of the Iranian Association of Playwrights and Critics of Theatre and Cinema.

== Works ==
- The Mailman (Amazon)
- Sheyda & Soofi
- Piano's Teacher
- Love in Our Time
- Burning Red
- The Last Little Mermaid
- The Dark Room
- Stay One More Night, Silvia
- One Small Morning
- And more than 100 other books.

== Translation of Works ==
- The Postman (also published as The Mailman) was translated into English by Esmail Javaheri in the United States and published through Amazon Publishing in 2017.
- Postacı (the Turkish translation of The Postman) was translated into Turkish by Farhad Eyvazi in 2016 and published by Zoom Kitap in Turkey.
- پۆستچی (the Kurdish Sorani translation of The Postman) was translated by Muhammad Mardi and published in Sulaymaniyah, Kurdistan Region of Iraq.
- Hello to the Impossible (Poetry collection, 1997, Ofogh Publishing); translated into English by Dr. Farzan Sojoodi in 2003, published by Namira Publishing.
- Close Encounter of the Last Kind (Play, 2003, Namayesh Publishing); translated into English.
- Magic and Spell (Play, 1999, Namira Publishing); translated into English / translated into Armenian by Andranik Khechoumian in Armenia.
- The Last Little Mermaid (Play, 2000, Namira and Ghatreh Publishing); translated into English by Dr. Farzan Sojoodi.
- I Am Not Anna Karenina (Short story collection, 2006, Namira and Ghatreh Publishing); translated into English.

== International Productions and Activities ==
=== Crime and Punishment ===
The play Crime and Punishment, written and directed by Chista Yasrebi, is a theatrical adaptation based on the novel by Fyodor Dostoevsky, produced in 2006.

The production was staged at the International Festival of Russian Classics in Moscow, where it received nominations in three categories. The play was selected as the Best Production of the festival, and Mahsa Mahjoor won the First Prize for Best Actress for her performance. Drawing on her academic background in psychology, Yasrebi focused her adaptation on the psychological dimensions and inner conflicts of the characters, particularly Raskolnikov.

=== Women of Moonlight, Sun of Man ===
The play Women of Moonlight, Sun of Man (Persian: زنان مهتابی، مرد آفتابی), written by Chista Yasrebi and directed by Kourosh Zarei, was staged in 2003 as Iran's representative at the Ethos International Theater Festival in Turkey.

Prior to its international staging, the script had won the First Prize for Playwriting at the 21st Fajr International Theater Festival in 2002. The production also served as a basis for further cultural collaborations between the theater communities of Iran and Turkey.

=== Bride Hotel ===
The play Bride Hotel (Persian: هتل عروس), written by Chista Yasrebi, was staged on May 10, 2006, under the direction of Spanish director Rafael Robles Lorca, featuring an Iranian cast at the auditorium of Allameh Tabataba'i University.

The play was originally written under the title Fires' Brides (Persian: عروسان آتش) and had won the First Prize for Playwriting at the 1st Women's Theater Festival in 1995. It was later renamed and directed by Sima Tirandaz at the Fajr International Theater Festival in 2000.

=== Close Encounters of the Last Kind ===
Close Encounters of the Last Kind is a play written by Chista Yasrebi. In addition to its performances in Iran, the production has been staged internationally, including in Baku, the capital of Azerbaijan.

=== Activities in Tajikistan ===
Chista Yasrebi has been involved in several cultural and artistic collaborations in Tajikistan. Her activities related to the country include:

- Television Play "He Dreams of His Subjects in Prison": This production, based on the life of filmmaker and artist Sergei Parajanov, featured an international cast. Parts of the television play were filmed in Tajikistan, Armenia, and Georgia.
- Play Readings: Yasrebi has visited Tajikistan for theatrical projects, including in February 2025, where she conducted staged play readings of her work I Love You in a Whisper (Persian: دوستت دارم با صدای آهسته) in collaboration with local artists.

=== The Witch and the Talisman ===
The Witch and the Talisman (Persian: شعبده و طلسم) is a one-act play written by Chista Yasrebi. It tells the story of an actor who, despite recounting ancient legends and making others laugh, lacks happiness in their own life. The play, which had previously received awards at domestic festivals in Iran including the Fajr International Theater Festival and the Women's Theater Festival, was translated into Armenian by Andranik Khachoumian. This translation led to the production of the play in Armenia and introduced contemporary Iranian dramatic literature to audiences in the Caucasus region.

=== Jarireh ===
The play Jarireh (Persian: جریره), written by Chista Yasrebi and directed by Parisa Bayenat, was performed in English from May 17 to 24, 2019, in Cambridge, Boston, United States. The production, adapted from stories in Ferdowsi's Shahnameh, was staged with the following credits:

- Subject: Adaptation of the story of Jarireh from the Shahnameh
- Venue: First Church in Cambridge, Boston
- Composer and Pianist: Noam Elkies
- Opera Singer: Theodora Cottarel
- Cast: Marie Pinault, Ellie Burke, Theodora Cottarel, Sara Ashrafi, Sepideh Falsafi, and Neda Toluie
- Musicians: Jafar Alizadeh and Frank Ghafour

=== University of Iowa Playwriting Competition ===
In 2012, Chista Yasrebi won the first prize in an international playwriting competition on the theme of "Interfaith Dialogue and Reconciliation" at the University of Iowa in the United States. The details of the selected work and event are as follows:

- Title of the Work: The play is known by the titles The Lady and the Dead Man and A Meeting in the Park.
- Theme: Reconciliation and dialogue among different religions.
- Performance: The script was selected from the submitted works and was presented as a staged reading by American actors at the University of Iowa, where it secured the first prize.

=== The Queen and Maldini ===
The Queen and Maldini is a play written and directed by Chista Yasrebi that was proposed for production in 2003. The structure of the production was designed to be performed in a futsal hall rather than a traditional theater venue, aiming to explore human relationships through the metaphors of a football match.

A feature of this project was a formal invitation extended to Paolo Maldini, the captain of A.C. Milan and the Italy national football team at the time, to appear as a special guest performing as himself. The proposed collaboration received coverage in both Iranian and Italian media outlets, including the newspaper Corriere della Sera. However, the play did not reach public performance after it was rejected during the review stage of the Fajr International Theater Festival.

=== Story Reading at New York University ===
In 2000, Chista Yasrebi, along with Farkhondeh Hajizadeh, attended a literary program at the Center for Near Eastern Studies at New York University at the invitation of Mohammad Mehdi Khorrami, where she participated in a story-reading session. The writer Shahriar Mandanipour was also invited to the event but was unable to attend due to visa restrictions.

In the same year, Yasrebi's short story titled "Love and Scream" was published in the anthology A Feast in the Mirror: Stories by Contemporary Iranian Women. Edited by Mohammad Mehdi Khorrami and Shouleh Vatanabadi and published by Lynne Rienner Publishers, the collection focused on introducing the works of contemporary Iranian women writers to an English-speaking audience.

=== Iranian Women's Week in Canada (2004) ===
Chista Yasrebi’s participation in a literary reading in Canada dates back to the cultural event "Iranian Women’s Week," held in the autumn of 2004.

The ten-day cultural program was organized under the direction and with the financial support of Roshangaran and Women’s Studies Publications (headed by Shahla Lahiji), in collaboration with several Iranian women’s cultural associations in Canada. The cultural tour brought together a group of Iranian women writers, authors, and filmmakers, including Chista Yasrebi, Shahla Lahiji, Parinoush Saniee, and Leili Farhadpour. During this event, Yasrebi presented a paper on the evolution of dramatic literature by Iranian women playwrights.

=== Activities in Austria ===
==== The Performance: Iranian Women (2008) ====
In 2008, Chista Yasrebi conceived and choreographed a performance entitled Iranian Women, based on movements inspired by the poetry of Rumi. The performance was staged by the Iranian Association in Austria.

==== The Play: Unveiling the Statue of the Man on a Bicycle ====
Yasrebi wrote a play entitled Unveiling the Statue of the Man on a Bicycle, conceived in an operatic style and based on two of Mozart’s celebrated works, Requiem and The Magic Flute. The work was specifically planned for rehearsal and performance in Salzburg, Austria, as part of the worldwide celebrations marking the anniversary of Mozart.

=== Wolf in Her Eyes ===
(Spanish: Un lobo en sus ojos)

The Uruguayan theatrical production was directed by Raúl Rodríguez and opened on September 10, 2020.

The play officially premiered on Thursday, September 10, 2020, at the Casa de la Cultura in Paysandú, Uruguay. The production was helmed by the Uruguayan theatre director Raúl Rodríguez. The premiere ceremony was attended by the Ambassador of the Islamic Republic of Iran to Montevideo, who highlighted the role of such cultural events in strengthening the friendly ties between the governments and peoples of both nations.

Reception

The production received a warm reception from Uruguayan audiences, generating significant anticipation among the residents of Paysandú (sanduceros). Due to the high public interest, organizers scheduled additional performances of the play for the following weeks. The event was covered by the Spanish-language service of the Islamic Republic News Agency (IRNA) on September 12, 2020.

Press Coverage

IRNA Spanish — Una obra teatral iraní recibe una gran acogida entre los uruguayos

- https://es.irna.ir/news/84035320/Una-obra-teatral-iran%C3%AD-recibe-una-gran-acogida-entre-los-uruguayos

== Republished works ==
Several organizations and institutions in Iran have republished Yasrebi's works. Examples included:

- Works by Chista Yasrebi republished by the National Content Consortium
- Works by Chista Yasrebi republished by the Center for the Great Islamic Encyclopedia

== Awards and honors ==
- Nominated for Best Screenplay at the Fajr International Film Festival for the film Invitation.
- Received the Best Dramatic Literature Award for the play The Last Little Mermaid.
- Received the Dialogue Among Civilizations Award for The Little Mermaid.
- Won first prize in press criticism writing in 1996 for a collection of theatre and cinema reviews published in Donyaye Tasvir, Soroush, Zanan, Gozaresh-e Film, and the newspaper Hamshahri.
- 1996: Best Translator of the Year Award, Institute for the Intellectual Development of Children and Young Adults (Kanoon Parvaresh-e Fekri)
- Received Best Play awards at the Fajr International Theater Festival for the plays Burning Red, Close Encounter of the Last Kind, Moonlit Women; Sunlit Man, and Magic and Spell.
- Received the Best Playwright Award for Moonlit Women; Sunlit Man.
- Received the Parvin Etesami Festival Award.
- 1992: Golden Sunflower Award for Best Serialized Story, ''Aftabgardān'' Newspaper, ''Hamshahri''
- Received the Best Theater Director award for Burning Red at the 1995 Fajr International Theater Festival.
- Received the Best National Screenplay Award for the film The Moon Over the Platform.
- Received Best Screenplay at the Telefilm Festival for A Woman from the Back Alley.
- Received the Mehregan Adab Award for the short story collection I Am Not Anna Karenina.
- The play Behind the Pine Shadows was nominated for Book of the Year.
- Received the Best Book of the Year in Cyberspace award for the novel The Mailman.
- Received the Best Story Award on children with disabilities from the Children’s Book Council of Iran.
- Received the Best Book of the Year Award for the novel The Mailman (2015).
- 2006: Nominated for Best Production for the play Crime and Punishment at the International Festival of Russian Classics, Moscow.
- 2006: First Prize for Best Actress awarded to the production's lead (Mahsa Mahjoor) for Crime and Punishment at the International Festival of Russian Classics, Moscow.
- 2017: Nominated for the Amazon UK Kindle Storyteller Award for the English translation of the novel ''The Mailman'' (translated by Esmaeil Javaheri).
- Playwriting Award from the Playwrights Association of the Iranian Theatre Forum for the play ''With Love, Count to Eight''

== Professional affiliations ==
- Member of the International Playwrights Program at the University of Iowa, United States.

== Views ==
- Women are present as well as men in Shahnameh, the masterpiece of Ferdowsi.
- I knew Ferdowsi in his respect of women and family and never saw that he reduces the value of family in his precious masterpiece.

Life is filled with episodes, some of which remain in our memories while others fade away. A single word, a glance, a smile, a movement of the hand, a simple decision; and one little episode unfolds after another, filling our lives with countless little stories, and nothing more… In The Backyard, our gaze turns toward the private solitude of human beings, toward the little stories that unfold in the hidden corners of their lives; toward that courtyard behind the house of the heart, where their secrets are treasured and their memories lie concealed…

— Chista Yasrebi on the theme of her work, "The Backyard"
