= Risk factors for breast cancer =

Overview article

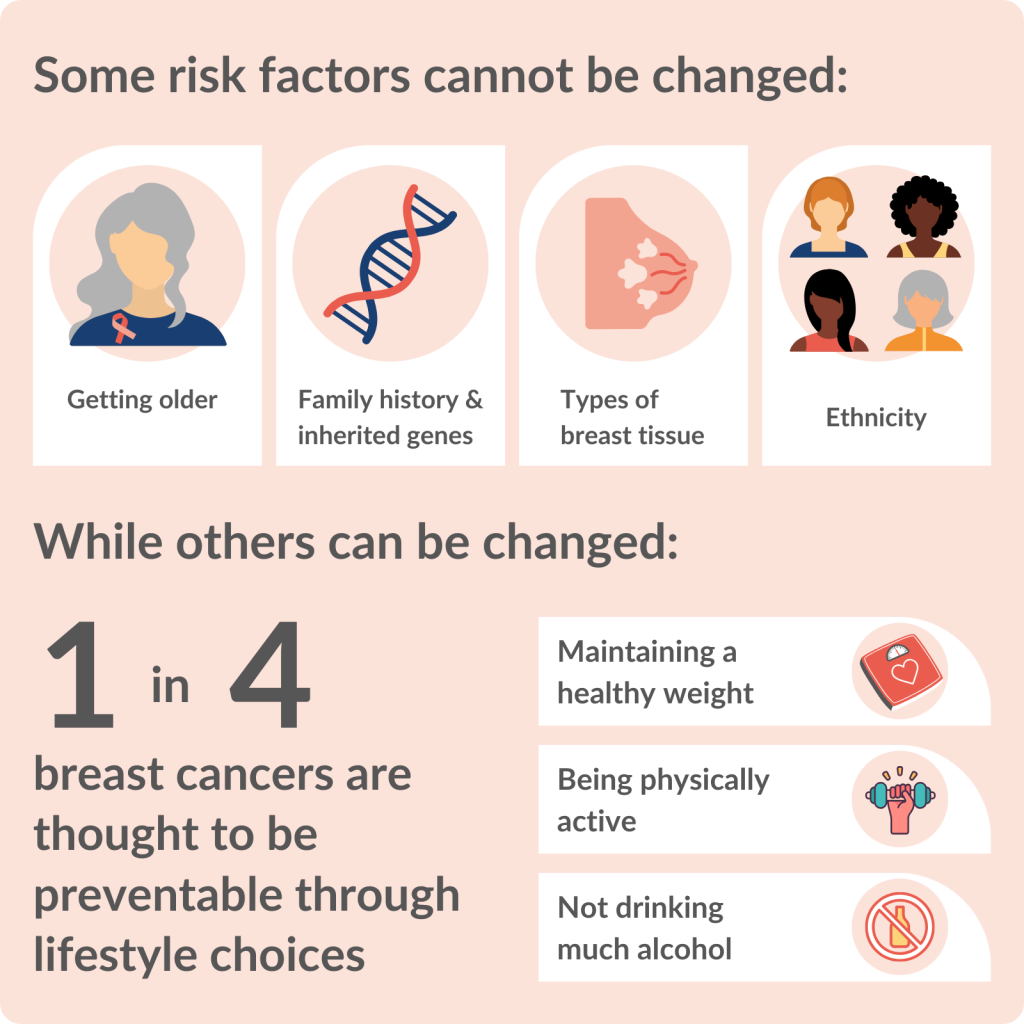
Some risk factors can be changed

Risk factors for breast cancer may be divided into preventable and non-preventable. Their study belongs in the field of epidemiology. Breast cancer, like other forms of cancer, can result from multiple environmental and hereditary risk factors. The term environmental, as used by cancer researchers, means any risk factor that is not genetically inherited.

For breast cancer, the list of environmental risk factors includes the individual person's development, exposure to microbes, "medical interventions, dietary exposures to nutrients, energy and toxicants, ionizing radiation, and chemicals from industrial and agricultural processes and from consumer products...reproductive choices, energy balance, adult weight gain, body fatness, voluntary and involuntary physical activity, medical care, exposure to tobacco smoke and alcohol, and occupational exposures, including shift work" as well as "metabolic and physiologic processes that modify the body's internal environment." Some of these environmental factors are part of the physical environment, while others (such as diet and number of pregnancies) are primarily part of the social, cultural, or economic environment.

Although many epidemiological risk factors have been identified, the cause of any individual breast cancer is most often unknowable. Epidemiological research informs the patterns of breast cancer incidence across certain populations, but not in a given individual. Approximately 5% of new breast cancers are attributable to hereditary syndromes, and well-established risk factors accounts for approximately 30% of cases. A 2024 review found that there is a convincing association between increased breast cancer risk with high BMI and weight gain in postmenopausal women and a decreased risk from high fiber intake and high sex hormone-binding globulin levels.

== Age ==
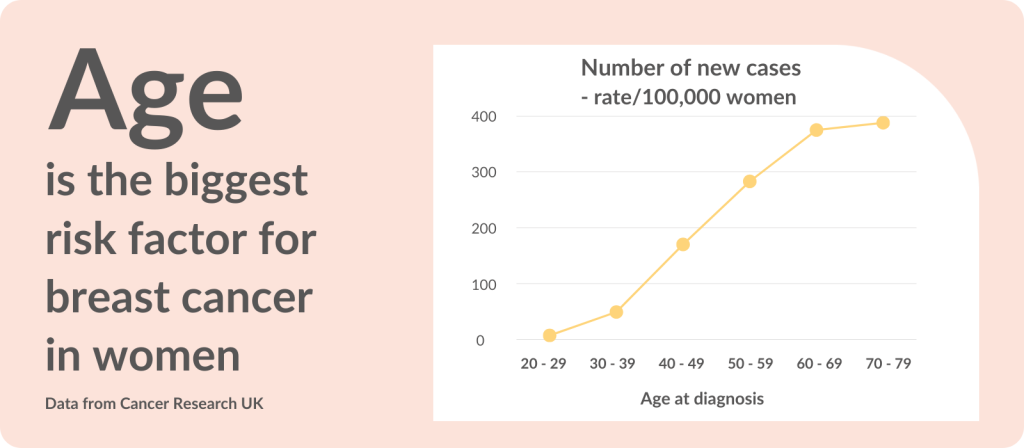
Age is the biggest risk factor for breast cancer

The risk of getting breast cancer increases with age. A woman is more than 100 times more likely to develop breast cancer in her 60s than in her 20s. The risk over a woman's lifetime is, according to one 2021 review, approximately "1.5% risk at age 40, 3% at age 50, and more than 4% at age 70."

In the United States, about one in eight women (~13%) and one in 800 men (~0.13%) will be diagnosed with breast cancer at some point during their lives. These numbers can vary depending on the location one grows up in, as numerous environmental factors can increase or decrease risk.

Though the probability of breast cancer increases with age, breast cancer tends to be more aggressive in younger people.

== Sex ==
Male individuals have a much lower risk of developing breast cancer than females. In developed countries, about 99% of breast cancer cases are diagnosed in female patients; in a few African countries, which represent the highest incidence of male breast cancer, males account for 5–15% of cases. The rate of male breast cancer appears to be rising somewhat.

Male breast cancer patients tend to be older than female ones. They are more likely to be diagnosed with hormone-receptor positive tumors, with about six out of seven cases being estrogen-receptor positive. The overall prognosis is worse for male than for female patients.

== Heredity ==
The United Kingdom, being a member of the International Cancer Genome Consortium, is leading efforts to map breast cancer's complete genome.

=== BRCA1 and BRCA2 ===
In 5% of breast cancer cases, there is a strong inherited familial risk.

Two autosomal dominant genes, BRCA1 and BRCA2, account for most of the cases of familial breast cancer. Women who carry a harmful BRCA mutation have a 60% to 80% risk of developing breast cancer in their lifetimes. Other associated malignancies include ovarian cancer and pancreatic cancer. If a mother or a sister was diagnosed breast cancer, the risk of a hereditary BRCA1 or BRCA2 gene mutation is about two-fold higher than those women without a familial history. Commercial testing for BRCA1 and BRCA2 gene mutations has been available in most developed countries since at least 2004.

In addition to the BRCA genes associated with breast cancer, the presence of NBR2, near breast cancer gene 1, has been discovered, and research into its contribution to breast cancer pathogenesis is ongoing.

=== Other genes ===
Hereditary non-BRCA1 and non-BRCA2 breast tumors (and even some sporadic carcinomas) are believed to result from the expression of weakly penetrant but highly prevalent mutations in various genes. For instance, polymorphism has been identified in genes associated to the metabolism of estrogens and/or carcinogens (Cytochrome P450, family 1, member A1, CYP1B1, CYP17A1, CYP19, Catechol-O-methyltransferase, N-acetyltransferase 2, Glutathione S-transferase Mu 1, GSTP1, GSTT, . . . ), to estrogen, androgen and vitamin D action (ESR1, AR, VDR), to co-activation of gene transcription (AIB1), to DNA damage response pathways (CHEK2, HRAS1, XRCC1, XRCC3, XRCC5). Sequence variants of these genes that are relatively common in the population may be associated with a small to moderate increased relative risk for breast cancer. Combinations of such variants could lead to multiplicative effects. Sporadic cancers likely result from the complex interplay between the expression of low penetrance genes (risk variants) and environmental factors. However, the suspected impact of most of these variants on breast cancer risk should, in most cases, be confirmed in large populations studies. Indeed, low penetrance genes cannot be easily tracked through families, as is true for dominant high-risk genes.

Part of the hereditary non-BRCA1 and non-BRCA2 breast tumors may be associated to rare syndromes, of which breast cancer is only one component. Such syndromes result notably from mutations in TP53 (Li–Fraumeni syndrome), ATM (ataxia–telangiectasia), STK11/LKB1(Peutz–Jeghers syndrome), PTEN (Cowden syndrome).

RAB11FIP1, TP53, PTEN and rs4973768 are also associated with increased risk of breast cancer. rs6504950 is associated with lower risk of breast cancer.

Mutations in RAD51C confer an increased risk for breast and ovarian cancer.

== Prior cancers ==
People who have previously been diagnosed with breast, ovarian, uterine, or bowel cancer have a higher risk of developing breast cancer in the future. Mothers of children with soft-tissue sarcoma may have an increased risk of breast cancer.

== Dietary factors ==
The Western dietary pattern is associated with an increased risk of breast cancer.

=== Alcohol ===
There is strong evidence that alcohol consumption increases risk of breast cancer.

=== Calcium ===
Several reviews have found a weak inverse association between dietary calcium intake and breast cancer risk. The World Cancer Research Fund International and American Institute for Cancer Research have stated that there is limited evidence that diets high in calcium might decrease the risk of breast cancer.

=== Fruits and vegetables ===
High total dietary fiber consumption and total fruit and vegetable consumption is associated with a reduced risk of breast cancer.

=== Meat ===
High total processed meat and red meat consumption are associated with increased breast cancer risk.

=== Saturated fat ===
Several reviews of case–control studies have found that saturated fat intake is associated with increased breast cancer risk.

=== Sugar ===
Sugar consumption does not cause cancer. The National Breast Cancer Foundation have stated that "eating too much of any food can contribute to weight gain, obesity, and health issues, which can in turn increase breast cancer risk, but there is no direct link between sugar and breast cancer. Consuming sugar in moderation as part of a healthy diet does not cause breast cancer".

== Obesity and lack of exercise ==
Gaining weight after menopause can increase a woman's risk. A 2006 study found that putting on 9.9 kg (22 lbs) after menopause increased the risk of developing breast cancer by 18%. Lack of exercise has been linked to breast cancer by the American Institute for Cancer Research.

Obesity has been linked to an increased risk of developing breast cancer by many scientific studies. There is evidence to suggest that excess body fat at the time of breast cancer diagnosis is associated with higher rates of cancer recurrence and death. Furthermore, studies have shown that obese women are more likely to have large tumors, greater lymph node involvement, and poorer breast cancer prognosis with 30% higher risk of mortality.

Weight gain after diagnosis has also been linked to higher rates of breast cancer recurrence or mortality although this finding is not consistent. Weight gain is often less severe with newer chemotherapy treatments but one study found a significant risk of breast cancer mortality in women who gained weight compared to those who maintained their weight. However, other cohort studies and recent clinical trials have not shown a significant relationship between weight gain after diagnosis and breast cancer mortality.

Weight loss after diagnosis has not been shown to decrease the risk of breast cancer recurrence or mortality. However, physical activity after breast cancer diagnosis has shown some associations with reducing breast cancer recurrence and mortality independent of weight loss. Data for both weight loss and physical activity and the effect on breast cancer prognosis is still lacking.

There is debate as to whether the higher rate of breast cancer associated with obesity is due to a biological difference in the cancer itself, or differences in other factors such as health screen practices. It has been suggested that obesity may be a determinant for breast cancer screening by mammography. Seventeen scientific studies in the United States have found that as obesity increases in women over 40 years of age the rate of mammography reported decreases significantly. When stratified by race (white vs. black) there was a stronger relationship between obesity and lack of mammography screening among white women. Another study also found lower rates of mammography among those who were overweight and obese compared to those women who were of normal body mass index—this effect was only seen in white women. Obese women are more likely to list pain associated with mammograms as a reason for not getting screened; however, leaner women also list this as a reason for avoiding mammograms. Other reasons obese women may avoid mammography are due to lack of insurance, low income, or embarrassment at the procedure, although when these factors are accounted for, the effect of lower rates of screening are still significant. In contrast, other studies have shown that mammography patterns did not differ among women who were obese compared to those at a healthy weight indicating that there may be biological differences in cancer presentation between these groups.

== Hormones ==
Persistently increased blood levels of estrogen are associated with an increased risk of breast cancer, as are increased levels of the androgens androstenedione and testosterone (which can be directly converted by aromatase to the estrogens estrone and estradiol, respectively). Increased blood levels of progesterone are associated with a decreased risk of breast cancer in premenopausal women. A number of circumstances which increase exposure to endogenous estrogens including not having children, delaying first childbirth, not breastfeeding, early menarche (the first menstrual period) and late menopause are suspected of increasing lifetime risk for developing breast cancer.

However, not only sex hormones but also insulin levels are positively associated with the risk of breast cancer.

=== Pregnancy, childbearing and breastfeeding ===
Lower age of first childbirth, compared to the average age of 24, having more children (about 7% lowered risk per child), and breastfeeding (4.3% per breastfeeding year, with an average relative risk around 0.7) have all been correlated to lowered breast cancer risk in premenopausal women, but not postmenopausal women, in large studies. Women who give birth and breastfeed by the age of 20 may have even greater protection. In contrast, for instance, having the first live birth after age 30 doubles the risk compared to having first live birth at age less than 25. Never having children triples the risk. The studies have found that these risk factors become less material as a woman reaches menopause, i.e. that they affect risk of breast cancer prior to menopause but not after it. In balancing premenopausal reductions in risk from childbirth and lactation, it is important also to consider the risks involved in having a child.

=== Hormonal contraception ===
Hormonal contraceptives may produce a slight increase in the risk of breast cancer diagnosis among current and recent users, but this appears to be a short-term effect. In 1996 the largest collaborative reanalysis of individual data on over 150,000 women in 54 studies of breast cancer found a relative risk (RR) of 1.24 of breast cancer diagnosis among current combined oral contraceptive pill users; 10 or more years after stopping, no difference was seen. Further, the cancers diagnosed in women who had ever used hormonal contraceptives were less advanced than those in nonusers, raising the possibility that the small excess among users was due to increased detection. The relative risk of breast cancer diagnosis associated with current and recent use of hormonal contraceptives did not appear to vary with family history of breast cancer. Some studies have suggested that women who began using hormonal contraceptives before the age of 20 or before their first full-term pregnancy are at increased risk for breast cancer, but it is not clear how much of the risk stems from early age at first use, and how much stems from use before the first full-term pregnancy.

=== Hormone replacement therapy ===
Data exist from both observational and randomized clinical trials regarding the association between menopausal hormone replacement therapy (menopausal HRT) and breast cancer. The largest meta-analysis (1997) of data from 51 observational studies, indicated a relative risk of breast cancer of 1.35 for women who had used HRT for five or more years after menopause. The estrogen-plus-progestin arm of the Women's Health Initiative (WHI), a randomized controlled trial, which randomized more than 16,000 postmenopausal women to receive combined hormone therapy or placebo, was halted early (2002) because health risks exceeded benefits. One of the adverse outcomes prompting closure was a significant increase in both total and invasive breast cancers (hazard ratio = 1.24) in women randomized to receive estrogen and progestin for an average of five years. HRT-related breast cancers had adverse prognostic characteristics (more advanced stages and larger tumors) compared with cancers occurring in the placebo group, and HRT was also associated with a substantial increase in abnormal mammograms. Short-term use of hormones for treatment of menopausal symptoms appears to confer little or no breast cancer risk. A correlation was found between the use of hormonal contraceptives and subsequent reliance on hormone replacement therapy.

=== Oophorectomy and mastectomy ===
Prophylactic oophorectomy (removal of ovaries) and mastectomy in individuals with high-risk mutations of BRCA1 or BRCA2 genes reduces the risk of developing breast cancer as well as reducing the risk of developing ovarian cancer. Because of the complex balance of benefits and risks of prophylactic surgery, it is recommended only in very specific cases, such as those where high-risk gene mutations are detected.

=== Hormonal therapy ===
Hormonal therapy has been used for chemoprevention in individuals at high risk for breast cancer. Overall it is recommended only in very special circumstances. In 2002, a clinical practice guideline by the US Preventive Services Task Force (USPSTF) recommended that "clinicians discuss chemoprevention with women at high risk for breast cancer and at low risk for adverse effects of chemoprevention" with a grade B recommendation.

==== Selective estrogen receptor modulators (SERMs) ====
The 2002 USPSTF guidelines were based on studies of SERMs from the MORE, BCPT P-1, and Italian trials. In the MORE trial, the relative risk reduction for raloxifene was 76%. The P-1 preventative study demonstrated that tamoxifen can prevent breast cancer in high-risk individuals. The relative risk reduction was up to 50% of new breast cancers, though the cancers prevented were more likely estrogen-receptor positive (this is analogous to the effect of finasteride on the prevention of prostate cancer, in which only low-grade prostate cancers were prevented). The Italian trial showed benefit from tamoxifen.

Additional randomized controlled trials have been published since the guidelines. The IBIS trial found benefit from tamoxifen. In 2006, the NSABP STAR trial demonstrated that raloxifene had equal efficacy in preventing breast cancer compared with tamoxifen, but that there were fewer side effects with raloxifene. The RUTH Trial concluded that "benefits of raloxifene in reducing the risks of invasive breast cancer and vertebral fracture should be weighed against the increased risks of venous thromboembolism and fatal stroke". On September 14, 2007, the US Food and Drug Administration approved raloxifene (Evista) to prevent invasive breast cancer in postmenopausal women.

=== Endocrine disruptors ===
Many xenoestrogens (industrially made estrogenic compounds) and other endocrine disruptors are potential risk factors of breast cancer.

Diethylstilbestrol (DES) is a synthetic form of estrogen. It has been used between the early 1940s and 1971. Pregnant women took DES to prevent certain pregnancy complications. However, it also increased their risk of breast cancer. It also increased the risk of breast cancer in the prenatally exposed daughters after the age of 40.

== Factors in the physical environment ==
According to a review, the main mechanisms by which environmental compounds increase breast cancer risk are acting like hormones, especially estrogen, or affecting susceptibility to carcinogenesis. The evidence to date generally supports an association between breast cancer and polycyclic aromatic hydrocarbons (PAHs) and polychlorinated biphenyls (PCBs). Dioxins and organic solvents, on the other hand, have only shown an association in sparse and methodologically limited studies, but are suggestive of an association. Overall, however, evidence is still based on a relatively small number of studies.

=== Xenoestrogens ===
Many xenoestrogens (industrially made estrogenic compounds) are endocrine disruptors, and potential risk factors of breast cancer. Endocrine disruption is the hypothesis that some chemicals in the body, such as Bisphenol A, are capable of interfering with the production, processing, and transmission of hormones.

A substantial and growing body of evidence indicates that exposures to certain toxic chemicals and hormone-mimicking compounds including chemicals used in pesticides, cosmetics and cleaning products contribute to the development of breast cancer.

The increasing prevalence of these substances in the environment may explain the increasing incidence of breast cancer, though direct evidence is sparse.

==== Bisphenol A ====
Exposure to bisphenol A causes breast cancer.

Bisphenol A (BPA) is a chemical compound used in the production of plastics found in numerous commercial products, including laptops, baby bottles, food containers, water main pipes, and laboratory and hospital equipment. BPA was first produced in 1891, but its estrogenic properties went undiscovered until the mid-1930s. Today it is considered a xenoestrogen, and it functions as an endocrine disruptor that interferes with hormones in the body and disrupts the normal functioning of the endocrine system. At very low levels the FDA has long considered BPA in food to be safe, but this has been challenged over the years as more information is discovered regarding the effects of the chemical.

Rats exposed prenatally to environmentally relevant doses of BPA show an increased number of intraductal hyperplasias (precancerous lesions) in mammary glands that appear during adulthood, while high doses induce the development of carcinomas in breast tissue. Animals exposed to BPA during fetal life develop palpable tumors, and all studies show an increased susceptibility to mammary gland neoplasia that manifests during adulthood. Exposure of mouse dams to environmentally relevant levels of BPA during organogenesis results in considerable alterations in the mammary gland. It was concluded that perinatal exposure to low doses of BPA results in altered mammary gland morphogenesis, induction of precancerous lesions, and carcinoma in situ.

A study sought to determine whether early exposure to BPA could accelerate mammary carcinogenesis in a dimethylbenzanthracene (DMBA) model of rodent mammary cancer. In the study, scientists exposed neonatal/prebubertal rats to BPA via lactation from nursing dams treated orally with 0, 25, and 250 μg BPA/kg body weight/day. For tumorigenesis studies, female offspring were exposed to 30 mg DMBA/kg body weight at 50 days of age. DMBA induces mammary tumors and allows chemicals that predispose for mammary cancer to increase the number of mammary adenocarcinomas. The results of the study showed that female rats in the control, BPA 25, and BPA 250 groups administered DMBA exhibited a BPA dose-dependent increase in mammary tumors. The groups had 2.84, 3.82, and 5.00 mammary tumors per rat respectively. Treatment with BPA also reduced tumor latency, with the median tumor latency of 65, 53, and 56.5 days for 0, BPA 25, and BPA 250 groups respectively. Maternal exposure to BPA during lactation decreased time to first tumor latency and increased the number of DMBA-induced mammary tumors in female offspring. If these effects found in rodents carry over to humans, even minimal exposure to BPA could cause an increased risk for breast cancer.

The elevated incidence of breast cancer in women has been associated with prolonged exposure to high levels of estrogens. Xenoestrogens such as BPA have the capacity to perturb normal hormonal actions. This study provides evidence of the estrogenic effects of BPA. In this study the human breast epithelial cells MCF-10F were treated with 10-3 M, 10-4 M, 10-5 M and 10-6 M BPA continuously for two weeks. The cells treated with 10-3 M BPA died on the second day of treatment. The concentration of 10-4 M BPA was also toxic for the breast epithelial cells, and they died on the fourth day of treatment. This data indicated that these concentrations of BPA are toxic for MCF-10F cells. After the two-week observation period it was seen that the cells formed a high percentage of duct-like structures in collagen. MCF-10F cells treated with 10-5 M and 10-6 M BPA formed a high percentage of solid masses, 27% and 20% respectively. This data indicates that BPA is able to induce neoplastic transformation of human breast epithelial cells. Epigenetic changes are involved in the early stages of cancer initiation by altering ductulogenesis. BPA was able to induce transformation of human breast MCF-10F epithelial cells. After treatment with BPA, the cells produced fewer collagen tubules and more solid masses.

Consumer groups recommend that people wishing to lower their exposure to bisphenol A avoid canned food and polycarbonate plastic containers (which shares resin identification code 7 with many other plastics) unless the packaging indicates the plastic is bisphenol A-free. The US National Toxicology Panel recommends avoiding microwaving food in plastic containers, putting plastics in the dishwasher, or using harsh detergents on plastics, to avoid leaching.

=== Aromatic amines ===
Aromatic amines are chemicals that are produced when products such as dyes, polyurethane products, and certain pesticides are made. They are also found in cigarette smoke, fuel exhaust, and in overcooked, burned meat. The three types of aromatic amines, monocyclic, polycyclic, and heterocyclic, have all been found in recent studies of breast health. Monocyclic amines have been found to cause mammary cancer in rats. Studies have shown that women who eat higher amounts of overcooked meat, meaning more exposure to heterocyclic amines, have also been diagnosed with more post-menopausal breast cancer. Heterocyclic amines also have the ability to copy estrogen and in laboratory studies have been found to encourage the growth of cancerous tumors on human tissue.

=== Benzene ===
Multiple studies point to a correlation between benzene exposure and breast cancer risk.

Benzene is a petrochemical solvent. Benzene exposure mostly originates from air pollution resulting from industrial burning, exhaust and gas fumes, as well as cigarette smoke. Petroleum, its distillates such as gasoline, auto and truck exhausts also contain benzene. The International Agency for Research on Cancer and the American National Toxicology Program have labeled benzene as a definite human carcinogen. Multiple studies point to a correlation between benzene exposure and breast cancer risk. Laboratory studies on mice have shown that a high level of benzene exposure can lead to mammary cancer.

=== DDT ===
Although the pesticide DDT was banned in the United States in the 1970s, studies have shown that there are still trace amounts found in certain agricultural products, as well as in human and animal milk. While individual studies have come to conflicting conclusions, the most recent reviews of all the evidence conclude that exposure to DDT before puberty increases the risk of breast cancer later in life.

=== Ethylene oxide ===
Ethylene oxide is a chemical that can be found in some personal care products, mainly in the form of fragrance. It is also used for the sterilization of various medical objects. The US National Toxicology Program has labeled ethylene oxide as a definite human and animal carcinogen. A study done by the US National Institute for Occupational Safety and Health, including 7,576 women, found a direct correlation between breast cancer rates and exposure to ethylene oxide during medical sterilization processes. Also, human breast cells put into contact with small amounts of ethylene oxide in a laboratory can lead to DNA damage of the breast tissue.

=== Polycyclic aromatic hydrocarbons ===
Polycyclic aromatic hydrocarbons (PAHs) are chemical products of combustion from coal burners, fuel, cigarette smoke, and various other sources. PAHs are often found in the air and are breathed into the body. PAHs bioaccumulate easily and can copy the estrogen hormone. PAHs can also be genotoxic, meaning they have the ability to harm DNA.

=== Vinyl chloride ===
Vinyl chloride is produced when PVC or polyvinyl chloride is made. PVC is found in plastic packaging, outerwear, plastic toys and other plastic products. Vinyl chloride can be found in cigarette smoke and the air around garbage and landfills. It can also be found in the wastewater when PVC is made. The US National Toxicology Program and the International Agency for Research on Cancer have both labeled vinyl chloride as a definite human carcinogen.

=== Tobacco ===
Until recently, most studies had not found an increased risk of breast cancer from active tobacco smoking. Beginning in the mid-1990s, a number of studies suggested an increased risk of breast cancer in both active smokers and those exposed to secondhand smoke compared to women who reported no exposure to secondhand smoke. By 2005 enough evidence had accumulated for the California Environmental Protection Agency to conclude that breathing secondhand smoke causes breast cancer in younger, primarily premenopausal women. The Agency concluded that the risk was increased by 70%, based on epidemiological studies and the fact that there are many mammary carcinogens in secondhand smoke. The following year (2006) the US Surgeon General identified the same risk increase and concluded that the evidence is "suggestive," one step below causal. There is some evidence that exposure to tobacco smoke is most problematic between puberty and first childbirth. The reason that breast tissue appears most sensitive to chemical carcinogens in this phase is that breast cells are not fully differentiated until lactation. The likely reason that the older studies of active smoking did not detect risks associated with smoking was that they compared active smokers to all nonsmokers (which includes many passive smokers). The newer studies, which exclude passive smokers from the control group, generally show elevated risks associated with active as well as passive smoking.

=== Radiation ===
Women who have received high-dose ionizing radiation to the chest (for example, as treatments for other cancers) have a relative risk of breast cancer between 2.1 and 4.0. The risk increases with increased dose. In addition, the risk is higher in women irradiated before age 30, when there is still breast development.

=== Dioxins ===
Dioxins (most notably the polychlorinated dibenzodioxins) are chemicals that are produced when chlorinated products are burned, such as polyvinyl chloride (PVC). This occurs when chlorinated products are used in certain manufacturing industries. Dioxins are also added to the air when gasoline and diesel fuels break down. Dioxins are able to bioaccumulate, meaning that they settle and stay in human and animal fat for long periods of time. There are many different types of dioxins and only a few of them have been labeled by the Environmental Protection Agency as definite human carcinogens and endocrine hormone disruptors. Although dioxins float in the air, they eventually settle on plants and other vegetation surfaces. These plants and vegetation are them eaten by cows and other animals. Humans end up eating the produce, milk, eggs, and meat produced by animals that have consumed dioxin-covered vegetation. Dioxins are more harmful when ingested this way. Multiple studies have led to the idea that increased dioxin levels can increase one's risk for breast cancer. A study done in 1976 after a chemical plant explosion in Seveso, Italy, concluded that high dioxin level exposure in a woman's body correlated with a more than double chance of developing breast cancer.

=== Light at night and disturbance of circadian rhythm ===
In 1978 Cohen et al. proposed that reduced production of the hormone melatonin might increase the risk of breast cancer and citing "environmental lighting" as a possible causal factor. Researchers at the National Cancer Institute (NCI) and National Institute of Environmental Health Sciences conducted a study in 2005 that suggests that artificial light during the night can be a factor for breast cancer by disrupting melatonin levels. According to a research in 2008, a reduced melatonin level in postmenopausal women is linked to a higher risk of breast cancer.

In 2007, "shiftwork that involves circadian disruption" was listed as a probable carcinogen by the World Health Organization's International Agency for Research on Cancer. Multiple studies have documented a link between night shift work and the increased incidence of breast cancer. A review of current knowledge of the health consequences of exposure to artificial light at night including the increased incidence of breast cancer and an explanation of the causal mechanisms has been published in the Journal of Pineal Research in 2007.

== Tonsillectomy ==
A systematic review and meta-analysis of eight studies revealed an association of prior tonsillectomy and risk of breast cancer in females.

== Ethnicity-related and socioeconomic factors ==
Incidence and mortality vary with ethnic background and social status. Incidence rises with improving economic situation, while mortality is tied to low economic status. In the US incidence is significantly lower and mortality higher among black women; this difference appears to persist even after adjustment for economic status. It is currently unclear if significant ethnic differences in incidence and mortality persist after adjustment for economic status between women of white, Hispanic and Asian origin in the US.

Several studies have found that black women in the US are more likely to die from breast cancer even though white women are more likely to be diagnosed with the disease. Even after diagnosis, black women are less likely to get treatment compared to white women. Scholars have advanced several theories for the disparities, including inadequate access to screening, reduced availability of the most advanced surgical and medical techniques, or some biological characteristic of the disease in the African American population. Some studies suggest that the racial disparity in breast cancer outcomes may reflect cultural biases more than biological disease differences. However, the lack of diversity in clinical trials for breast cancer treatment may contribute to these disparities, with recent research indicating that black women are more likely to have estrogen receptor-negative breast cancers, which are not responsive to hormone treatments that are effective for most white women. Research is currently ongoing to define the contribution of both biological and cultural factors.

Part of the differences in incidence attributable to race and economic status may be explained by past use of hormone replacement therapy.

== Factors with inconclusive research ==
=== 1,3-Butadiene ===
1,3-Butadiene is an environmental factor that can be found in air pollution and can be produced by combustion engines, as well as petroleum refineries. It is found in cigarette smoke and is also used in the making and processing of certain synthetic rubber products and fungicides. The US National Toxicology Program has labeled 1,3-Butadiene as definite human carcinogen. The US Environmental Protection Agency (EPA) has stated that people are mainly put in contact with this chemical through the means of simple inhalation.

=== Mammographic density ===
Mammographic density refers to the relative proportions of radiodense area compared to the radiolucent area on a mammogram, which is basically an x-ray of the breast. The radiodense area on a mammogram is white and is associated with ductal and lobular epithelium, connective tissue and fluid in the breast. The radiolucent area is dark gray or black and is associated with fat in the breast. High mammographic density is associated with a higher risk of developing breast cancer, but the reasons for this link are not certain and are being studied. Conversely, patients with very low mammographic breast density were found to hold a poorer prognosis irrespective of age, BMI and menopausal status.

=== Red No. 3 ===
Red No. 3 is a coloring agent used in some foods that has been found to increase the formation of certain tumors in rodents. While results from one study using cultured human breast cancer cells indicated that Red No. 3 may cause DNA damage, other studies have concluded that Red No. 3 does not cause DNA damage.

=== Viruses ===
Several kinds of viruses with oncogenic potential are suspected to play a role or cause breast cancer. Among the three most commonly studied are the human papilloma virus (HPV), mouse mammary tumour virus (MMTV) and the Epstein-Barr virus (EBV). A study published in 2011, reviewing 85 original molecular research investigations on the presence of one or more of these three viruses, found that only seven of the studies convincingly demonstrated the presence of an oncogenic virus biomarker, while twenty-five of the studies were able to show the absence of the virus studied, and the remaining studies were excluded due to shortcomings. Thus, the data from these investigations do not justify a conclusion as to whether HPV, MMTV, or EBV play a causal role in human breast cancer development.

Humans are not the only mammals susceptible to breast cancer. Some strains of mice, namely the house mouse (Mus domesticus) are prone to breast cancer which is caused by infection with the mouse mammary tumour virus (MMTV or Bittner virus, for its discoverer, John Joseph Bittner), by random insertional mutagenesis. It is the only animal breast cancer with a known etiology. These findings are taken to mean that a viral origin of human breast cancer is at least possible, though there is no definitive evidence to support the claim that MMTV causes human breast cancer. For example, there may be critical differences between cancer pathogenesis in mice and humans. A human homologue of the mammary virus has been described in 1971 and linked to human breast cancer in several small epidemiologic studies.

== Factors with minimal or no impact ==
There is no significant association between first-trimester abortion and breast cancer risk. There is no scientific evidence to prove that any kind of brassiere can cause cancer. The myth that breast cancer is linked with deodorant use has been widely circulated, and appears to originate from a spam email sent in 1999. There is, however, no evidence to support the existence of such a link. There is no persuasive connection between fertility medications and breast cancer.

== History ==
In past centuries, the development of breast cancer was most commonly seen as divine punishment or a trial. From Ancient Greek medicine until the end of the 17th century, the dominant medical explanation was an imbalance of the four humors. By the start of the 18th century, humoralism had generally been rejected. Many other theories were put forward, often related to sexual activity: In 1713, Bernardino Ramazzini said that nuns developed breast cancer at a higher rate than married women because they did not engage in sexual intercourse, and the "unnatural" lack of sexual activity caused instability of the breasts; others countered that the cause was frequently too much sexual activity. Other theories from the 18th century included various sorts of problems with the movement of body fluids, such as lymphatic blockages, curdled breast milk or the transformation of pus left after an infection.

In modern times, women are more likely to blame themselves, perhaps deciding that their diet, childbearing history, decision not to breastfeed, or level of exercise is the cause.

== See also ==
- Carcinogen § IARC classification of carcinogens
- Epidemiology of breast cancer
- Mouse models of breast cancer metastasis
- Silent Spring Institute
