= History of Philosophy Quarterly =

- Discipline: Philosophy
- Language: English
- Edited by: Brian Copenhaver

Publication details
- Publisher: University of Illinois Press (United States)

Standard abbreviations
- ISO 4: Hist. Philos. Q.

Indexing
- ISSN: 0740-0675 (print); 2152-1026 (web)
- LCCN: 95652866
- JSTOR: 07400675
- OCLC no.: 612484844

Links
- Journal homepage; Online archive 2009–present; Online archive 1984–2013

The History of Philosophy Quarterly (HPQ) is a peer-reviewed academic journal dedicated to the history of philosophy. The journal is indexed by PhilPapers and the Philosopher's Index.

The History of Philosophy Quarterly was founded in 1984 by Nicholas Rescher of the University of Pittsburgh. In the first issue, the editors of the journal announced that a focus would be on looking to the history of philosophy to help solve contemporary issues, advocating "that approach to philosophical history, increasingly prominent in recent years, which refuses to see the boundary between philosophy and its history as an impassable barrier, but regards historical studies as a way of dealing with problems of continued interest and importance." The journal is published by the University of Illinois Press and the current editor is Brian Copenhaver at University of California, Los Angeles.
