= NBR2 =

Non-coding RNA in humans

Identifiers
- Aliases: NBR2, NCRNA00192, neighbor of BRCA1 gene 2 (non-protein coding), neighbor of BRCA1 lncRNA 2
- External IDs: GeneCards: NBR2

Gene location (Human)
Chr.	Chromosome 17 (human)
Band	17q21.31	Start	43,125,551 bp
Band	17q21.31	End	43,153,671 bp
RNA expression pattern
Bgee	Human / Mouse (ortholog); Top expressed in: mucosa of transverse colon; gonad; right lobe of liver; right lobe of thyroid gland; left lobe of thyroid gland; right uterine tube; secondary oocyte; buccal mucosa cell; right ovary; body of stomach / n/a; More reference expression data
BioGPS	n/a
Orthologs
Databases	NCBI: entry; OMA: entry
Species	Human	Mouse
Entrez	10230	n/a
Ensembl	ENSG00000198496	n/a
UniProt	n a	n/a
RefSeq (mRNA)	NM_005821	n/a
RefSeq (protein)	n/a	n/a
Location (UCSC)	Chr 17: 43.13 – 43.15 Mb	n/a
PubMed search		n/a
- Wikidata
View/Edit Human

NBR2 is a gene best known for its location near the breast cancer associated gene BRCA1. Like BRCA1, NBR2 has been a subject of research, but links to breast cancer are currently inconclusive.

NBR2 recently was identified as a glucose starvation-induced long non-coding RNA. NBR2 interacts with AMP-activated protein kinase (AMPK), a critical energy sensor in most eukaryotic cells, and promotes AMPK function to mediate energy stress response. Knockdown of NBR2 attenuates energy stress-induced AMPK activation, resulting in unchecked cell cycling, altered apoptosis/autophagy response, and increased tumour development in vivo. It is now appreciated that NBR2, a former junk gene, plays critical roles in tumor suppression.
