= Health and Quality of Life Outcomes =

- Subject: Health-related quality of life
- Language: English
- Edited by: Holger Schünemann

Publication details
- History: 2003–present
- Publisher: BioMed Central
- Frequency: Irregular
- Impact factor: 2.278 (2017)

Standard abbreviations
- ISO 4: Health Qual. Life Outcomes

Indexing
- ISSN: 1477-7525
- LCCN: 2003252112
- OCLC no.: 992810571

Links
- Journal homepage; Online archive

Health and Quality of Life Outcomes is a peer-reviewed online-only open access medical journal covering research on health-related quality of life.

== History ==
The journal was established in 2003 and is published by BioMed Central. The editor-in-chief is Holger Schünemann (McMaster University). According to the Journal Citation Reports, the journal has a 2017 impact factor of 2.278.
