= Nagisa (harpist) =

Persian musician under Khosrow II (r. 590–628)

- Born: 6th–7th centuries
- Died: c. 628
- Other name: Nakisa
- Occupations: Harpist, Composer
- Known for: Noted harpist and composer of Sasanian music in the royal court of Khosrow II
- Notable work: Royal Khosrowvani

Nagisa or Nakisa was a noted harpist and composer of Sasanian music in the royal court of Khosrow II (r. 590–628). She was singing in this court.

Nizami mentioned her in his book Khosrow and Shirin. Amir Khosrow Dehlavi mentioned her in another story of Shirin and Khosrow.

== Historical context ==
The music of Iran stretches to at least the prehistoric depictions of arched harps from 3300 to 3100 BCE, though not until the 224–651 CE Sasanian Empire is substantial information available.

This influx of Sasanian records suggests a prominent musical culture in the Empire, especially in the areas dominated by Zoroastrianism.

Many Sassanian Shahanshahs were ardent supporters of music, including the founder of the empire Ardashir I and Bahram V. Khosrow II (r. 590–628) was the most outstanding patron, his reign being regarded as a golden age of Persian music.

In addition to Nagisa, musicians in Khosrow's service included Āzādvar-e Changi, (Note: Āzādvar-e Changi is also known as simply Āzād.) Bāmshād, Rāmtin, Sarkash and Bārbad, who was the most famous.

These musicians were usually active as minstrels, which were performers who worked as both court poets and musicians; in the Sassanian Empire there was little distinction between poetry and music.

== Court service and music ==
Nagisa is believed to have been of Greek origin.

She collaborated with Barbad on her famous septet piece, the Royal Khosrowvani (سرود خسروانى). The main themes of her songs were in praise of King Khosrau II.

Barbad and Nagisa greatly influenced and contributed to the Persian musical system, Khosrowvani. Accounts say that once Nakisa's audience was so moved by her performance that they passed out, or tore their garments (jame-daran).

== Sources ==
Books and Chapters

- Curtis, Vesta Sarkhosh (2003). "Persian Myths". World of Myths. Austin: University of Texas Press. ISBN 978-0-292-70607-1.
- During, Jean; Mirabdolbaghi, Zia, eds. (1991a). The Art of Persian Music. Washington D.C.: Mage Publishers. ISBN 978-0-934211-22-2.
  - During, Jean (1991a). "Historical Survey". The Art of Persian Music. pp. 31–56. (In During & Mirabdolbaghi (1991a))
  - During, Jean; Mirabdolbaghi, Zia (1991b). "The Instruments of Yesterday and Today". The Art of Persian Music. pp. 99–152. (In During & Mirabdolbaghi (1991a))
  - During, Jean (1991b). "Poetry and Music". The Art of Persian Music. pp. 153–166. (In During & Mirabdolbaghi (1991a))
- Farhat, Hormoz (2004). The Dastgah Concept in Persian Music. Cambridge: Cambridge University Press. ISBN 978-0-521-54206-7.
- Miller, Lloyd (2012). Music and Song in Persia: The Art of Avaz. Abingdon-on-Thames: Taylor & Francis. pp. 6, 19. ISBN 978-1-136-81487-7.

Journal and Encyclopedia articles

- Farhat, Hormoz (2012). "An Introduction to Persian Music" (PDF). Catalogue of the Festival of Oriental Music. Durham: University of Durham.
- Lawergren, Bo; Farhat, Hormoz; Blum, Stephen (2001). "Iran". Grove Music Online. Oxford: Oxford University Press. doi:10.1093/gmo/9781561592630.article.13895. ISBN 978-1-56159-263-0. (subscription, Wikilibrary access, or UK public library membership required)
  - Lawergren, Bo (2001). "I. Pre-Islamic". Iran. Grove Music Online. (In Lawergren, Farhat & Blum (2001))
  - Farhat, Hormoz (2001). "II. Classical traditions". Iran. Grove Music Online. (In Lawergren, Farhat & Blum (2001))
