= Bamshad =

Persian musician under Khosrow II (fl. 590–628)

- Born: 6th–7th centuries
- Died: c. 628
- Occupations: Musician, Minstrel-Poet
- Known for: Noted musician during the reign of Khosrow II
- Notable work: Sasanian music

Bamshad (Note: Also known by the diacritic form Bāmshād) (Persian: بامشاد) or Bāmšād was a musician of Sasanian music during the reign of Khosrow II (r. 590–628).

== Life and career ==
Many Shahanshahs of the Sasanian Empire were ardent supporters of music, including the founder of the empire Ardashir I and Bahram V. Khosrow II (r. 590–628) was the most outstanding patron, his reign being regarded as a golden age of Persian music.

Musicians in Khosrow's service include Āzādvar-e Changi (Note: Āzādvar-e Changi is also known as simply Āzād.), the harpist Nagisa (Nakisa), Ramtin, Sarkash (also Sargis or Sarkas) (Note: There is much contradiction in modern sources over the musicians Nagisa (Nakisa) and Sarkash (also Sargis or Sarkas). Some sources, such as During (1991a, p. 39) and Farhat (2004, p. 3) present them as separate individuals, listing them both as among the musicians of Khosrow's court. Other sources, such as Lawergren (2001, "5. Sassanian period, 224–651 CE.") and Farhat (2001, "1. History.") suggest the two are the same person: "harpist Sarkash (also called Nakisā)", and "Nakisa or Sarkash". Matters are made more confusing by the fact that Hormoz Farhat presented the two musicians differently.) and Barbad, who was by-far the most famous. These musicians were usually active as minstrels, which were performers who worked as both court poets and musicians; in the Sasanian Empire there was little distinction between poetry and music.

Essentially nothing is known of Bamshad except that he was a noted musician during the reign of Khosrow II (r. 590–628). His name comes from his practice of playing music at dawn every day: "bam" and "shad" translate as "dawn" and "happiness".

The Persian lexicons, for example Dehḵodā's Loḡat-nāma, describe him as a well-known musician equal to Barbad. He is also mentioned in a poem by the Persian poet Manūčehrī.

== Sources ==
Books and Chapters

- Curtis, Vesta Sarkhosh (2003). "Persian Myths". World of Myths. Austin: University of Texas Press. ISBN 978-0-292-70607-1.
- During, Jean; Mirabdolbaghi, Zia, eds. (1991a). The Art of Persian Music. Washington D.C.: Mage Publishers. ISBN 978-0-934211-22-2.
  - During, Jean (1991a). "Historical Survey". The Art of Persian Music. pp. 31–56. (In During & Mirabdolbaghi (1991a))
  - During, Jean; Mirabdolbaghi, Zia (1991b). "The Instruments of Yesterday and Today". The Art of Persian Music. pp. 99–152. (In During & Mirabdolbaghi (1991a))
  - During, Jean (1991b). "Poetry and Music". The Art of Persian Music. pp. 153–166. (In During & Mirabdolbaghi (1991a))
- Farhat, Hormoz (2004). The Dastgah Concept in Persian Music. Cambridge: Cambridge University Press. ISBN 978-0-521-54206-7.

Journal and Encyclopedia articles

- Lawergren, Bo; Farhat, Hormoz; Blum, Stephen (2001). "Iran". Grove Music Online. Oxford: Oxford University Press. doi:10.1093/gmo/9781561592630.article.13895. ISBN 978-1-56159-263-0. (subscription, Wikilibrary access, or UK public library membership required)
  - Lawergren, Bo (2001). "I. Pre-Islamic". Iran. Grove Music Online. (In Lawergren, Farhat & Blum (2001))
  - Farhat, Hormoz (2001). "II. Classical traditions". Iran. Grove Music Online. (In Lawergren, Farhat & Blum (2001))
- Tafażżolī, A. (1988). "Bāmšād". Encyclopædia Iranica. Leiden: Brill Publishers.
