= Barbad =

Persian musician-poet under Khosrow II (r. 590–628)

Bārbad
- باربد
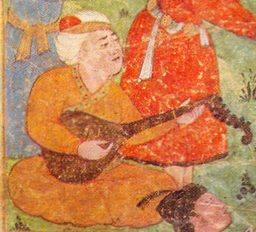
- Detail of Barbad playing the barbat for Khosrow II. Imaginary painting by Muhammad-Mukim, 1664
- Born: Merv or Jahrom
- Died: Ctesiphon?
- Years active: fl. late 6th – early 7th century CE
- Movement: Sasanian music

Barbad (Persian: باربد; fl. late 6th – early 7th century CE) was a Persian musician-poet, music theorist and composer of Sasanian music. He served as chief minstrel-poet under the Shahanshah Khosrow II (r. 590–628). A barbat player, he was the most distinguished Persian musician of his time and is regarded among the major figures in the history of Persian music.

Despite scarce biographical information, Barbad's historicity is generally secure. He was highly regarded in the court of Khosrow, and interacted with other musicians, such as Sarkash. Although he is traditionally credited with numerous innovations in Persian music theory and practice, the attributions remain tentative since they are ascribed centuries after his death. Practically all Barbad's music or poetry is lost, except a single poem fragment and the titles of a few compositions.

No Sasanian sources discuss Barbad, suggesting his reputation was preserved through oral tradition, until at least the earliest written account by the poet Khaled ibn Fayyaz (d. c. 718). Barbad appears frequently in later Persian literature, most famously in Ferdowsi's Shahnameh. The content and abundance of such references demonstrate his unique influence, inspiring musicians such as Ishaq al-Mawsili. Often described as the "founder of Persian music", Barbad remains a celebrated figure in modern-day Iran, Afghanistan and Tajikistan.

== Name ==
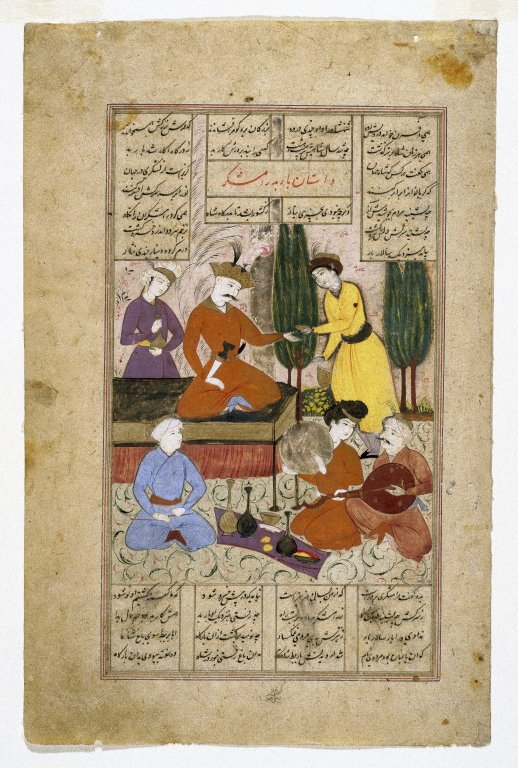
Bahram Gur and Courtiers Entertained by Barbad the Musician (Barbad bottom right). From a manuscript of Ferdowsi's Shahnameh, second half 17th century.

Posthumous sources refer to the Sasanian musician with little consistency. Persian sources record "Barbād" while Arabic scholars use Fahl(a)bad, Bahl(a)bad, Fahl(a)wad, Fahr(a)bad, Bahr(a)bad and Bārbad/ḏ. Modern sources most often use "Barbad", (Note: Virtually all sources in this article use the form "Barbad"—albeit sometimes differing in use of the transliterated diacritic marking over the "a" (e.g. "Bārbad")—see Curtis (2003, pp. 137–138), Kia (2016, p. 151), Miller (2012, p. 6) and Tafazzoli (1988, § para. 1) for instance.) a spelling that Danish orientalist Arthur Christensen first asserted to be correct. However, the German orientalist Theodor Nöldeke suggested that spellings from Arabic commentators such as "Fahl(a)bad" were really an arabicization of his actual name, probably Pahrbad/Pahlbad. Nöldeke furthered that "Bārbad" was a mistake in the interpretation of ambiguous Pahlavi characters. The Iranologist Ahmad Tafazzoli agreed with Nöldeke, citing a Sasanian seal which includes the name "Pahrbad/Pahlbad" and the earliest mention of the Sasanian musician, which uses a spelling—"Bahrbad/Bahlbad"—that suggests the name had been arabicized.

== Background ==
The music of Iran/Persia stretches to at least the depictions of arched harps from 3300–3100 BCE, though not until the period of the Sasanian Empire in 224–651 CE is substantial information available. This influx of Sasanian records suggests a prominent musical culture in the Empire, especially in the areas dominated by Zoroastrianism. Many Sasanian Shahanshahs were ardent supporters of music, including the founder of the empire Ardashir I and Bahram V. Khosrow II (r. 590–628) was the most outstanding patron, his reign being regarded as a golden age of Persian music. Musicians in Khosrow's service include Āzādvar-e Changi, (Note: Āzādvar-e Changi is also known as simply Āzād.) Bāmshād, the harpist Nagisa (Nakisa), Ramtin, Sarkash (also Sargis or Sarkas) (Note: There is much contradiction in modern sources over the musicians Nagisa (Nakisa) and Sarkash (also Sargis or Sarkas). Some sources, such as During (1991a, p. 39) and Farhat (2004, p. 3) present them as separate individuals, listing them both as among the musicians of Khosrow's court. Other sources, such as Lawergren (2001, §5 "Sassanian period, 224–651 CE") and Farhat (2001, §1 "History") suggest the two are the same person: "harpist Sarkash (also called Nakisā)", and "Nakisa or Sarkash". Matters are made more confusing by the fact that Hormoz Farhat presented the two musicians differently.) and Barbad, who was by-far the most famous. These musicians were usually active as minstrels, which were performers who worked as both court poets and musicians; in the Sasanian Empire there was little distinction between poetry and music.

Though many Middle Persian (Pahlavi) texts of the Sasanian Empire survive, only one—Khusraw qubadan va ridak—includes commentary on music, though neither it or any other Sasanian sources discuss Barbad. Barbad's reputation must have been transmitted through oral tradition, until at least the earliest source: an Arabic poem by Khaled ibn Fayyaz (d. c. 718). (Note: See Khazrai (2016, p. 168) for an English translation of Fayyaz's poem) In later ancient Arabic and Persian sources Barbad is the most discussed Sasanian musician, though he is rarely included in writings dedicated solely to music. A rare exception to this is a brief mention in Muhammad bin Muhammad bin Muhammad Nishābūrī's music treatise Rasaleh-i musiqi-i. Ancient sources in general give little biographical information and most of what is available is shrouded in mythological anecdotes. Tales from the poet Ferdowsi's Shahnameh, written during the late 10th century, include the most celebrated accounts of Barbad. Other important sources included Ferdowsi's contemporary, the poet al-Tha'alibi in his Ghurar al-saya, as well as Khosrow and Shirin and Haft Peykar from the poet Nezami Ganjavi's Khamsa of Nizami from the late 12th century. Despite this plethora of stories depicting him in a legendary context, scholars generally consider Barbad a wholly historical person.

== Life and career ==
=== Early life ===
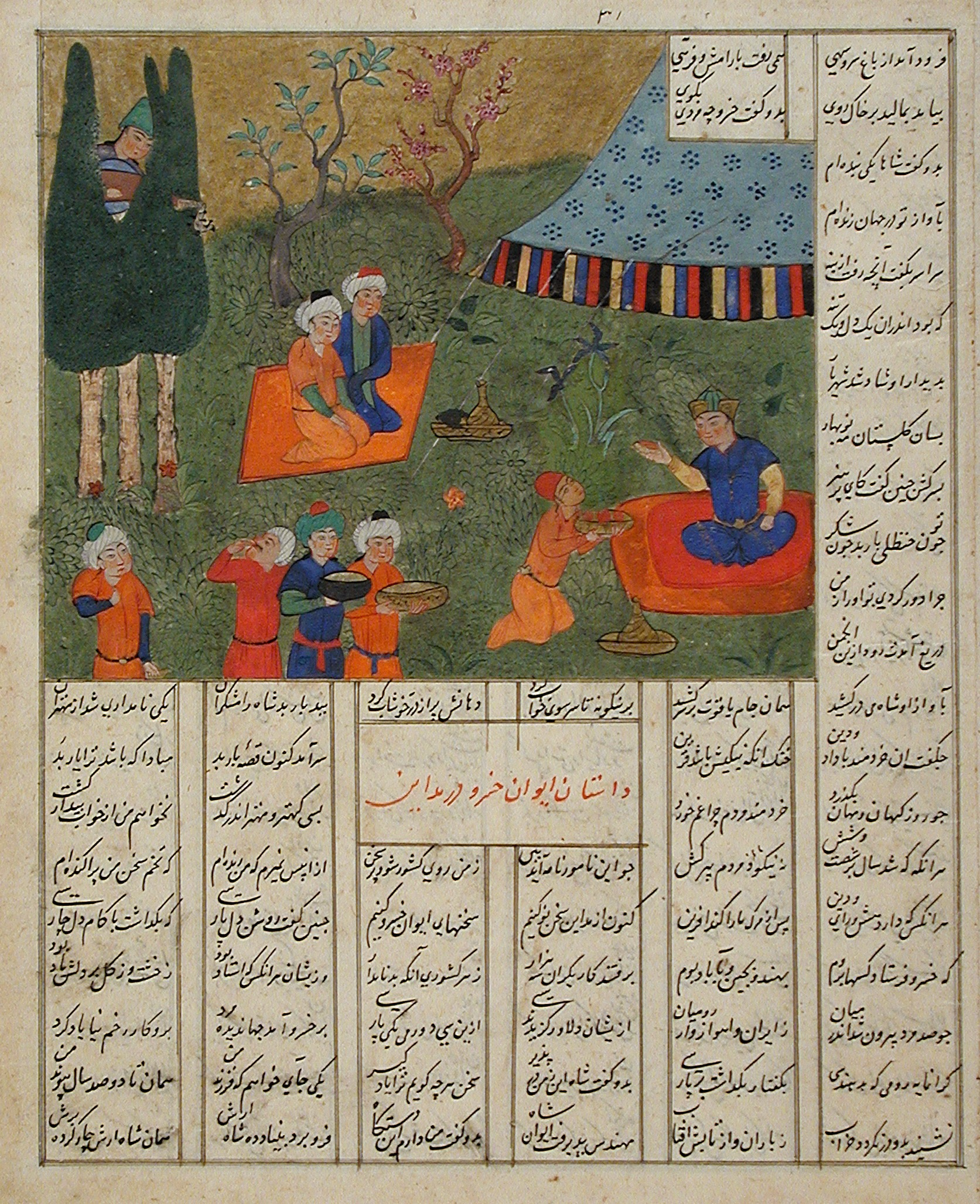
An illustration from a manuscript of Ferdowsi's Shahnameh, depicting Barbad (top left) hidden in the trees playing for Khosrow (bottom right).

There are contradictory ancient accounts as to the location of Barbad's birthplace. Older sources record the city of Merv in northeastern Khorasan, (Note: Older sources that give Merv as Barbad's birthplace include Ibn Khordadbeh's Kitāb al-lahw wa-l-malahi, Hamdallah Mustawfi's Nuzhat al-Qulub, al-Tha'alibi's Ghurar al-saya, as well as accounts by al-Jahiz and Istakhri.) while later works give Jahrom, (Note: Later sources that give Jahrom as Barbad's birthplace include the Farhang-e Jahangiri by Jamal al-Din Hosayn Enju Shirazi and an account by Fakhr al-Din al-Razi.) a small city south of Shiraz in Pars. Tafazzoli postulated that the writers who recorded Jahrom were referencing a line of Ferdowsi's Shahnameh that says Barbad traveled from Jarom to the capital in Ctesiphon when Khosrow was murdered; the modern historian Mehrdad Kia records only Merv.

Ferdowsi and al-Tha'alibi both relay a story that Barbad was a gifted young musician who sought a place as a court minstrel under Khosrow II but the jealous chief court minstrel Sarkash supposedly prevented this. As such, Barbad hid in the royal garden by dressing in all green. When Khosrow walked by Barbad sang three songs with his lute: Dād-āfrīd ("created by god"), Peykār-e gord ("battle of the hero" or "splendor of Farkar") and Sabz dar sabz ("green in the green"). Khosrow was immediately impressed and ordered that Barbad be appointed chief minstrel, (Note: The purported story on Barbad's accession to the chief court minstrel post exists in slightly different variants depending on its source. See Khazrai (2016, p. 169–170) for a discussion on the differences between the accounts of Ferdowsi and al-Tha'alibi. See modern retellings from unspecified sources in Curtis (2003, pp. 137–138), Kia (2016, p. 151), Miller (2012, p. 6) and Tafazzoli (1988, § para. 3)) a position known as the shah-i ramishgaran. (Note: The minstrel title alone may be referred to as rāmeshgar, gosān, or khunyāgar. "Poet-minstrel" is khunyagaran.) In Nizami's Khosrow and Shirin, Khosrow II is said to have had a dream where his grandfather Khosrow I prophesied that he would have a "have a minstrel called Barbad whose art could make even poison taste delicious".

=== Stories with Khosrow ===
Since his appointment at court, Barbad was Khosrow's favorite musician, and many stories exist about this prestige. His relationship with Khosrow was reportedly such that other members of the court would seek his assistance in mediating conflicts between them and the Shahanshah. A story in Nizami's Khosrow and Shirin, tells of Khosrow and Shirin as previously together, but forced to separate for political reasons; Khosrow marries someone else, but is soon reminded of Shirin. The two later met and arranged for the Nagisa to sing of Shirin's love for Khosrow, while Barbad sung of Khosrow's love for Shirin. The duet reconciled the couple and was recorded by Nizami in 263 couplets. The idea of setting music to poetry in order to represent the emotions of characters was unprecedented in Persian music. According to the 10th-century historian Ibn al-Faqih al-Hamadani's Kitab al-buldan, Khosrow's wife Shirin asked Barbad to remind Khosrow of his promise to build her a castle. To do so, he sung a song and was rewarded with an estate near Isfahan for him and his family. According to the Seljuk scholar Nizam al-Mulk, Barbad visited a courtier who had been imprisoned by Khosrow and upon being scolded by the Shahanshah, a "witty remark" was enough to resolve the situation.

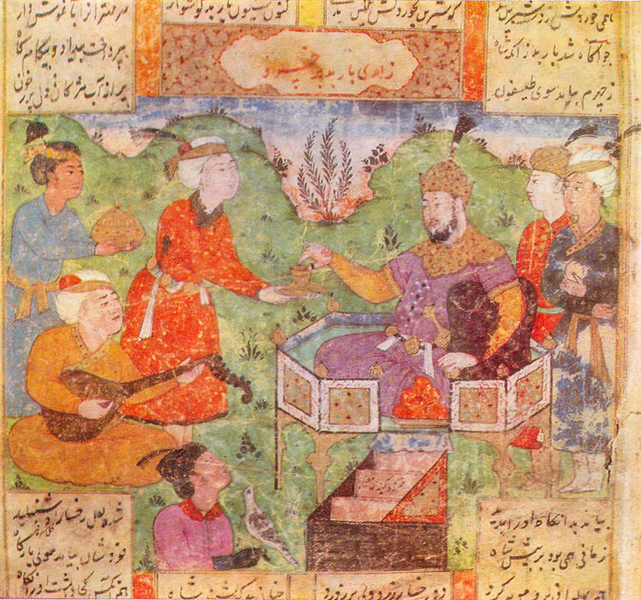
Barbad (left) playing music for Khosrow II

In the literary scholar Abu al-Faraj al-Isfahani's Kitab al-Aghani, a jealous rival musician once untuned the strings of Barbad's lute during a royal banquet. Upon returning to perform, Barbad began to play; royal rules forbade the tuning instruments in the Shahanshah's presence, but Barbad's skill was such that he could adapt to the untuned strings and play the pieces regardless. Al-Isfahani attributed this story to Ishaq al-Mawsili (776–856)—a renowned minstrel under Harun al-Rashid—who purportedly relayed the story to friends.

Among the most popular legends about Barbad involves Khosrow's beloved horse Shabdiz. In this story, Khosrow declared that when Shabdiz died, anyone who announced the news would be executed. Upon Shabdiz's death, no members of the court wished to risk conveying the news. To resolve the issue, Barbad sang a sad song, and Khosrow, understanding the purpose of the song, stated "Shabdiz is dead"; Barbad responded "Yes and it is your majesty who announced it", thereby preventing any possibility of death. This story was relayed earliest by the poet Khaled ibn Fayyaz (d. c. 718), with later accounts by al-Tha'alibi and the 13th-century writer Zakariya al-Qazwini. Many similar ancient stories originated in Iran, Turkey and Central Asia that pertain to musicians using music to express the death of a ruler's horse, as to avoid the ruler's wrath against the announcer. Various pieces for the Khwarazm dutar, Kyrgyz komuz and Kazakh dombra relay equivalent stories. Tafazzoli asserts that the story demonstrates Barbad's unique influence on Khosrow, while musicologist Lloyd Miller suggest that this and similar stories suggest that music and musicians in general exerted a significant influence on their political leaders.

=== Death ===
Like his birthplace, there are conflicting accounts surrounding the final years of Barbad's life. According to Ferdowsi, upon the murder of Khosrow by Kavad II, Barbad rushed from Jahrom to the capital of Ctesiphon. After arriving he sang elegies, cut off his fingers and burned his instruments out of respect. Al-Tha'alibi's account holds that Sarkash, who had remained at the court since being ousted from the chief minstrel position, poisoned Barbad. The 9th-century geographer Ibn Khordadbeh's Kitāb al-lahw wa-l-malahi, however, records the opposite, stating that Barbad poisoned Sarkash but was spared from Khosrow's punishment by way of a "witty remark". The 9th-century scholar Ibn Qutaybah's ‘Uyūn al-Akhbār and the 10th-century poet Ibn Abd Rabbih's al-ʿIqd al-Farīd state that Barbad was killed by a different musician, variously recorded as Yošt, Rabūst, Rošk and Zīwešt.

== Music and poetry ==
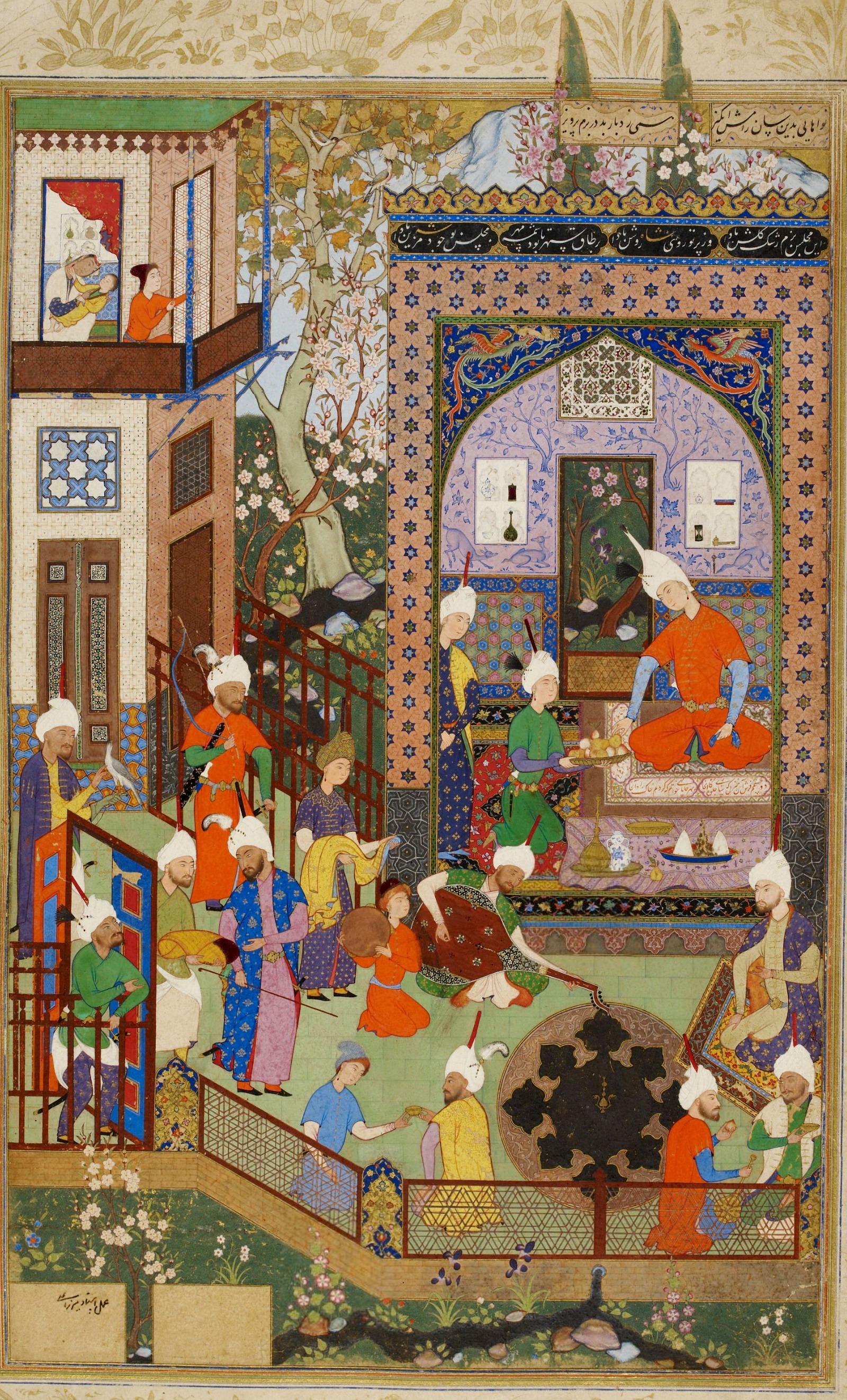
1539 illustration, Barbad in the middle with a barbat, attributed to Mirza Ali.

Barbad was active as a musician-poet, lutenist, music theorist and composer. His compositions included panegyrics, elegies and verses. These were performed by himself at festivals such as Nowruz and Mehregan, as well as state banquets and victory celebrations. While none of the compositions are extant, the names have survived for some, and they suggest a wide variety in the topics he musically engaged with. The ethnomusicologist Hormoz Farhat has tentatively sorted them into different groupings: epic forms based on historical events, kin-i Iraj (lit. 'the Vengeance of Iraj'), kin-i siavash (lit. 'the Vengeance of Siavash'), and Taxt-i Ardashir (lit. 'the Throne of Ardashir'); songs connected to the Sasanian royal court, Bagh-i shirin (lit. 'the garden of Shirin'), Bagh-i Shahryar (lit. 'the Sovereign's Garden'), and haft Ganj (lit. 'the seven treasures'); and "compositions of a descriptive nature", roshan charagh (lit. 'bright lights'). According to both scholars Ibn al-Faqih and the 13th-century geographer Yaqut al-Hamawi, Barbad wrote Bag-e nakjiran (lit. 'garden of the game') for workers who had recently finished the gardens of Qasr-e Shirin.

A single poem by Barbad survives, though in a quoted state from the Kitab al-lahw wa al-malahi by Ibn Khordadbeh. The work is a 3-hemistich panegyric in Middle Persian, but with an Arabic script; none of its music is extant. The poem is as follows:

Ceasar resembles the moon and Khaqan the sun,
[but] my lord is like the rich clouds,
whenever he wants he hides the moon or the sun.

— Barbad, in the Kitab al-lahw wa al-malahi by Ibn Khordadbeh

Christensen suggested in 1936 that the text Khvarshēdh ī rōshan (lit. 'The shining sun') is from a poem that was written and performed by Barbad himself or another musician-poet of his time. The text is found in a group of Manichaean manuscripts in Turpan, Xinjiang, China and is written in Middle Persian, which Barbad would have used. It has four 11-syllable lines and its title recalls the Sasanian melody Arāyishn ī khvarshēdh (lit. 'The beauty of the sun').

The shining sun, the beaming full moon
Resplendent and beaming behind the trunk of a tree;
The eager birds strut about it full of joy,
The doves and the colorful peacocks strut about.

— Khvarshēdh ī rōshan (lit. 'The shining sun'), attri. unknown Sasanian musician, possibly Barbad

Barbad is traditionally regarded as the inventor of numerous aspects of Persian music theory and practice. Al-Tha'alibi first credited him with creating an organized modal system of seven "Royal modes" (al-ṭoruq al-molukiya), known variously as xosrovani (Persian: سرود خسروانى), Haft Ḵosravāni, or khosravani. This attribution is later repeated by scholars such as al-Masudi and Qutb al-Din al-Shirazi. From these royal modes, Barbad created 30 "derivative modes" (lahn), and 360 melodies (dastan). (Note: See Farmer (1926) for a list of all the purported 30 modes.) The structure of seven, 30 and 360 variations corresponds to the number of days, weeks and months of the Zoroastrian calendar. (Note: Scholar Bo Lawergren notes that having 360 to match the days of a year ignores the five intercalary days.) Farhat notes that the exact reason for this is not known, though according to the 14th-century poet Hamdallah Mustawfi's Tarikh-i guzida, Barbad sang one of the 360 melodies each day for the Shahanshah. Al-Tha'alibi recorded that the seven royal modes were still in use during his lifetime, from 961 to 1039. Further information on the nature of these subjects, theories or compositions has not survived. In her analysis of the historical and literary sources concerning Barbad, musicologist Firoozeh Khazrai stated that "until a new independent source on the subject comes to light, many of these attributions should be regarded as authorial inventions". She noted that many of the attributions to Barbad date centuries after his death and the 30 modes in particular are first connected to Barbad by Nizami, who lived in the 12th century. In addition, in his divan (collection of poems), the 11th-century poet Manuchehri names a few of the modes that Nizami mentioned but does not associate them with Barbad, even though he references the Sasanian musician elsewhere.

== Reputation ==
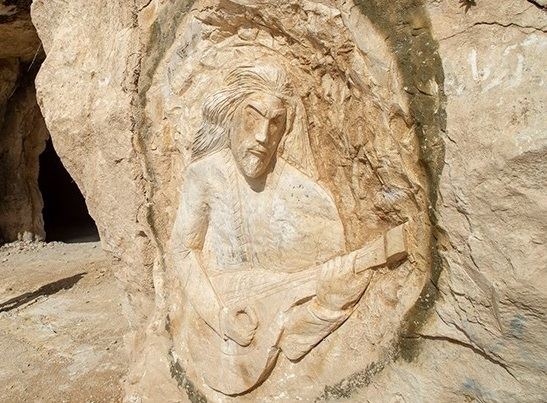
Relief of Barbad in the Sangtarashan cave of Jahrom, Iran

Barbad's lute was the four-stringed barbat. It had been popular in his time, but no traces of the instrument survive and it was eventually substituted for the oud. The musicologists Jean During and Zia Mirabdolbaghi note that despite the instrument's gradual disuse, "the term barbat survived for centuries, through classical poetry, as a symbol of the golden age of the Persian musical tradition, served by artists such as Bārbad." Later sources regularly praise Barbad and some offer him the epitaph as the "founder of Persian music". He is regarded as the most significant musician of his time, being among the major figures in the history of Iranian/Persian music. In Sharh bar Kitāb al-adwar, the 14th-century writer al-Sharif al-Jurjani—whom the work is attributed to—says:

"Among the ancient musicians, there were those who never played the same melody twice in presence of the king. Such was Barbad, who lived during the time of [Khosrow II]. He took care to study his audience well. He paid attention to the disposition of his listeners' souls, and then he would improvise words and a melody suited to the occasion and corresponding perfectly to each person's desire. His fame spread throughout the world, and [Khosrow] boasted about the fact that neither the kings of the past, nor those of his time, possessed such an artist."

— al-Jurjani (attri.), Sharh bar Kitāb al-adwar (Note: Recorded by Rodolphe d'Erlanger (1938).)

The preponderance and frequent transmission of stories involving Barbad attest to his popularity long after his death. In modern-day Iran, Afghanistan and Tajikistan, Barbad continues to be a celebrated figure. In 1989 and 1990 the cultural establishment of the Tajik government encouraged their people to find pride in Barbad's achievements; the panegyrics given for Barbad are part of a larger effort by the Tajik government to pass off the "achievements of pre-Islamic Iranian civilization" as Tajik ones. The largest musical hall of Dushanbe, Tajikistan, is named "Kokhi Borbad" after Barbad.

Musicologist Firoozeh Khazrai sums up Barbad's legacy as such:

"From the sources and nature of the things attributed to Barbad, we can conclude that Barbad survived in an oral popular culture that immortalized him by continually retelling old stories about him, and the legendary power of his music, and by spinning out new ones. While all these stories mythologize Barbad without telling us any solid information about the actual nature of his music, they underscore the unparalleled authority of the minstrel and the powerful grip he and his music continued to exercise on the imagination of the people in the post-Sasanian era."

— Firoozeh Khazrai

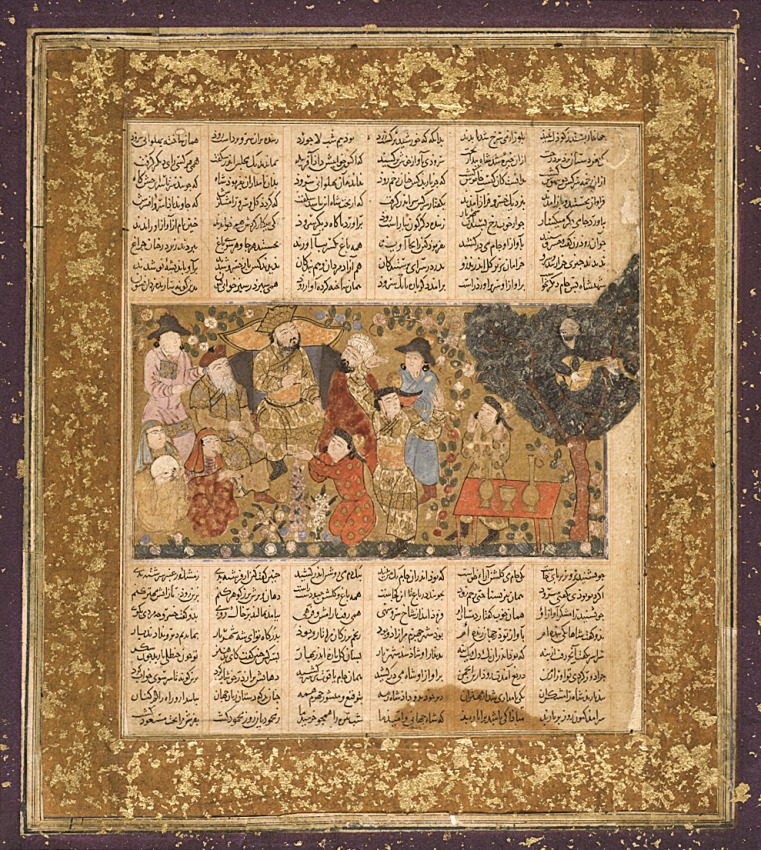
Illustration from the Shahnameh with Barbad in a tree in the top right. The work is kept at the Los Angeles County Museum of Art

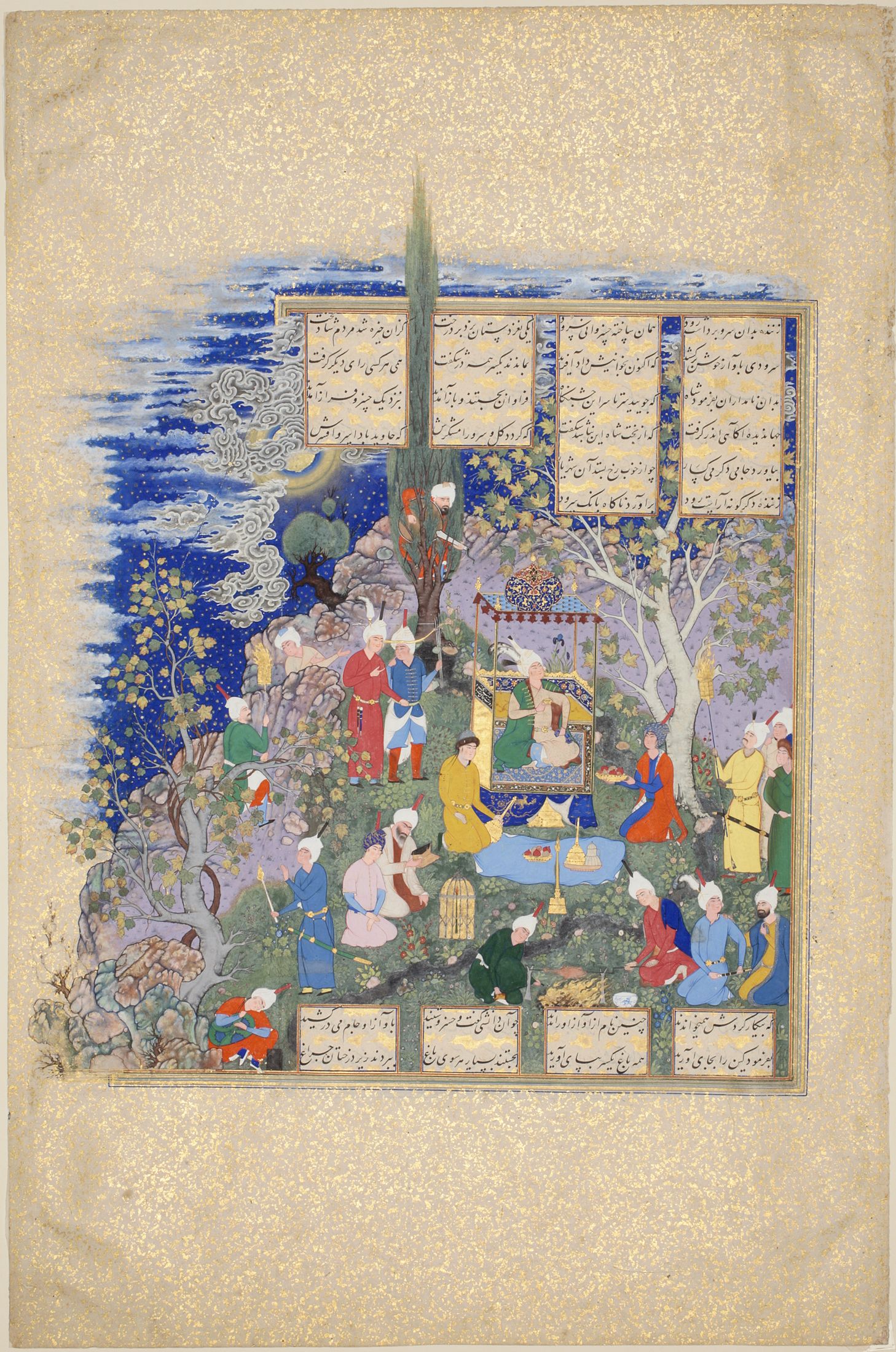
1535 painting of Barbad (pictured in the tree), attributed to Mirza Ali
