= Musicema Awards =

Musicema Awards (Our Music Awards)
- Current: 4th Annual Musicema Awards
- Awarded for: Official poster of the 2nd Annual Musicema Awards.
- Country: Iran
- Presented by: Musicema
- First award: June 30, 2013; 13 years ago

Musicema Awards is an Iranian annual music awards ceremony based in Tehran, Iran.

The ceremony was founded by the news and analytics website of Musicema, and is supported by the Music Office of the Ministry of Ershad. It has been taking place annually since 2013, held at the Roudaki Hall of Tehran.

Annually, the officially sanctioned musical activities of the country are examined in two stages—the jury's review and the popular choice—and the winners are awarded a copy of a golden statuette that is the symbol of the ceremony.

== Awards ==
- Best Song of the Year
- Best Album of the Year
- Best Single of the Year
- Best Songwriter of the Year
- Best Composer of the Year
- Best Arranger of the Year
- Best Producer of the Year
- Best Album Cover Design of the Year
- Bestselling Album of the Year
- Best Publisher of the Year
- Best Concert Organization of the Year

== See also ==
- National Festival of Youth Music
- Fajr International Music Festival
