= Sasanian music =

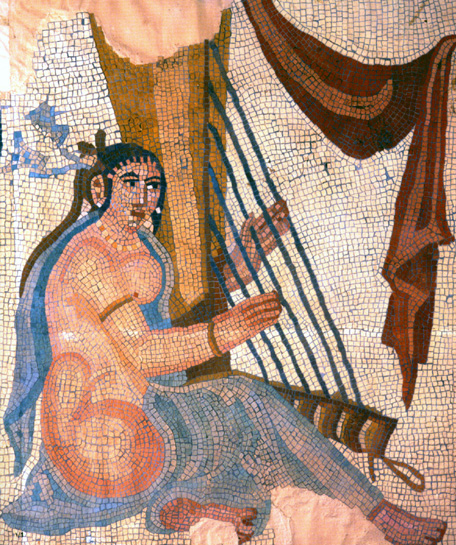
Marble mosaic of Sasanian harpist playing angular harp, c. 260 CE, from the palace of Shapur I in Bishapur.

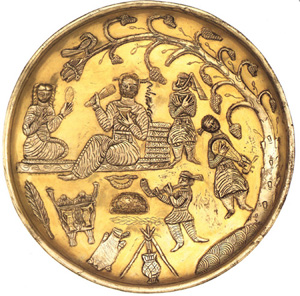
7th century plate depicts Sasanian era musicians. The British Museum.

Sasanian music encompasses the music of the Sasanian Empire, which existed from 224 to 651 CE. Many Sasanian Shahanshahs were enthusiastic supporters of music, including the founder of the empire Ardashir I and Bahram V. In particular, Khosrow II (r. 590–628) was an outstanding patron, his reign being regarded as a golden age of Persian music.

Persian classical music dates to the sixth century BCE; during the time of the Achaemenid Empire (550–331 BCE), music played an important role in prayer and in royal and national events. But Persian music had its zenith during the Sasanian dynasty from 224 until 651 CE.

In this era, many of Persian music's dastgahs and modes were invented, most of them traditionally attributed to Barbad. He employed 30 sounds for music. Naturally he recorded his inspirations and performed them for his audience, since if he did not, he could not play them again.

Dance and chanson were prevalent in court banquets. It said that on several occasions Persian musicians and dancers were given to the court of Chinese emperors by Sassanid kings, implying the high reputation and virtuosity of Persian musicians and dancers in that era. Another important role that music played was in the reception of foreign diplomats and kings from neighbouring countries, such as Byzantine or Hephthalites.

Five centuries after Barbad's death, Farabi made a record of all the musical pieces of his period and described the ancient note recording method.

== Music in Sasanian Iran ==
The history of musical performance in Sassanid Iran is however better documented than earlier periods. This is specially more evident in the context of Zoroastrian ritual. Because happiness, laughter and festivity was cherished in Zoroastrianism, entertainers like jesters and musicians were highly esteemed. They maintained a central role in daily court assemblies. Stability and prosperity in the empire was reflected in the activities of jesters, clowns and musicians.

By the time of Khusro Parviz, the Sassanid royal court was the host of prominent musicians. In general the period of Khosro Parviz reign is regarded as a "golden age of Iranian music" and himself is shown in a large relief at Taq-e Bostan among his musicians and himself holding bow and arrows and while standing in a boat amidst a group of harpists. The relief depicts two boats and the whole picture shows these boats at "two successive moments within the same panel".

== Instruments ==
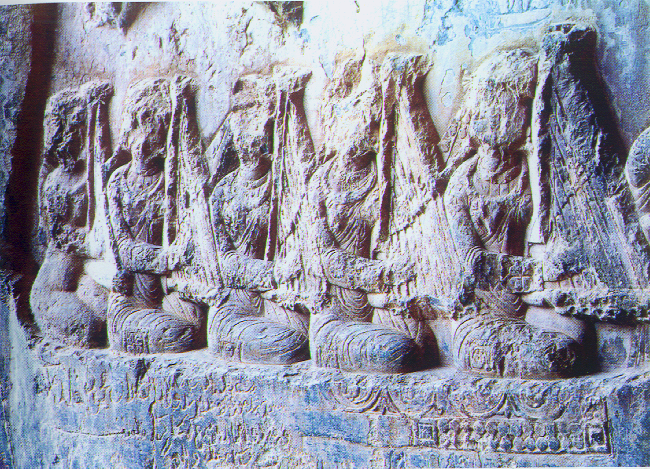
Taq-e Bostan carving, Women playing harp while the king is hunting.

The musical instruments which appear distinctly on the Sassanid sculptures are the chang(harp), the sorna(Horn), the Daf, the drum, the ney, the barbat(oud), the kamanche And the tanbur

The harp is triangular, and has seven strings; it is held in the lap, and played apparently by both hands.

The drum is of small size.

The horns and pipes are too crudely represented for their exact character to be apparent.

Concerted pieces seem to have been sometimes played by harpers only, of whom as many as ten or twelve joined in the execution. Mixed bands were more numerous.

In one instance the number of performers amounts to twenty−six, of whom seven play the harp, an equal number the flute or pipe, three the horn, one the drum, while eight are too slightly rendered for their instruments to be recognized. A portion of the musicians occupy an elevated orchestra, to which there is access by a flight of steps.

== Famous Sasanian musicians ==
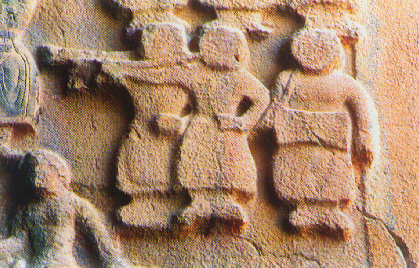
Female musicians accompanying king during hunting, Taq-e Bostan.

By the time of Khusro Parviz, the Sassanid royal court was the host of prominent musicians such as

=== Ramtin ===
He was also a remarkable musician.

=== Bamshad ===
He was another court musician of Khosrau II. He used to play early morning (dawn) songs which could please the king and people and bring happiness to the society.

=== Nakisa ===
She was also the court musician of the Sassanid Empire. The main theme of her songs were in praise of King Khosrau II. The main instrument that she played was a harp. (written by Zahra Neshat-Taherzadeh)

=== Sarkash ===
Though not as renowned as Barbod or Nakisa, he was a remarkable musician.

=== Barbad ===
Barbad is remembered in many documents and has been named as remarkably high skilled.
He has been credited to have given an organisation of musical system consisting of seven "Royal modes" named Khosrovani, thirty derivative modes named lahn, and 360 melodies named dastan.
These numbers are in accordance with Sassanid's calendar of number of days in a week, month, and year. The theories based on which these modal system was based are not known, however the writers of later period have left a list of these modes and melodies.
These names include some of epic forms such as kin-e Iraj (lit. the Vengeance of Iraj), kin-e siavash (lit. the Vengeance of Siavash), and Taxt-e Ardashir (lit. the Throne of Ardashir) and some connected with the glories of Sassanid royal court such as Bagh-e shirin (lit the garden of Shirin), Bagh-e Shahryar (lit. the Sovereign's Garden), and haft Ganj (lit. the seven threasures). There are also some of a descriptive nature like roshan cheragh (lit. bright lights).

== Bibliography ==
- Farhat, Hormoz (2004). The Dastgah Concept in Persian Music. Cambridge: Cambridge University Press. ISBN 978-0-521-54206-7.
- de Jong, Albert (2003). "Sub specie maiestatis: Reflections on Sasanian Court Rituals". In Stausberg, Michael (ed.). Zoroastrian Rituals in Context. Brill Publishers. pp. 345–365. ISBN 978-9004131316.
- Lawergren, Bo; Farhat, Hormoz; Blum, Stephen (2001). "Iran". Grove Music Online. Oxford: Oxford University Press. doi:10.1093/gmo/9781561592630.article.13895. ISBN 978-1-56159-263-0. (subscription, Wikilibrary access, or UK public library membership required)
  - Lawergren, Bo (2001). "I. Pre-Islamic". Iran. Grove Music Online. (In Lawergren, Farhat & Blum (2001))
  - Farhat, Hormoz (2001). "II. Classical traditions". Iran. Grove Music Online. (In Lawergren, Farhat & Blum (2001))
- Lawergren, Bo (2009). "Music History i. Pre-Islamic Iran". Encyclopædia Iranica. Leiden: Brill Publishers.
