= Music of Iran =

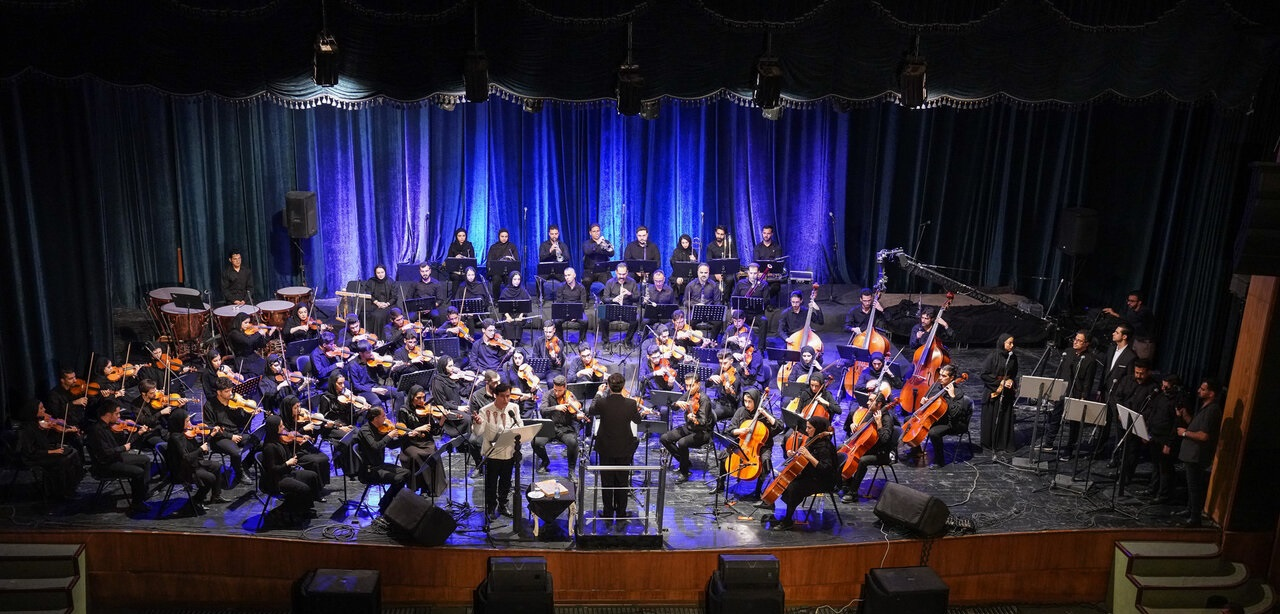
Fars Symphony Orchestra at Hafez Hall

The music of Iran encompasses music produced by Iranian artists. In addition to the traditional folk and classical genres, it also includes pop and internationally celebrated styles such as jazz, rock, and hip hop.

Iranian music influenced other cultures in West Asia, building up much of the musical terminology of the neighboring Turkic and Arabic cultures, and reached India through the 16th-century Persianate Mughal Empire, whose court promoted new musical forms by bringing Iranian musicians.

== History ==
=== Earliest records ===
Music in Iran, as evidenced by the "pre-Iranian" archaeological records of Elam, the oldest civilization in southwestern Iran, dates back thousands of years. Iran is the birthplace of the earliest complex instruments, which date back to the third millennium BC. A number of trumpets made of silver, gold, and copper were found in eastern Iran that are attributed to the Oxus civilization and date back between 2200 and 1750 BC. The use of both vertical and horizontal angular harps have been documented at the archaeological sites of Madaktu (650 BC) and Kul-e Fara (900–600 BC), with the largest collection of Elamite instruments documented at Kul-e Fara. Multiple depictions of horizontal harps were also sculpted in Assyrian palaces, dating back between 865 and 650 BC.

=== Classical antiquity ===
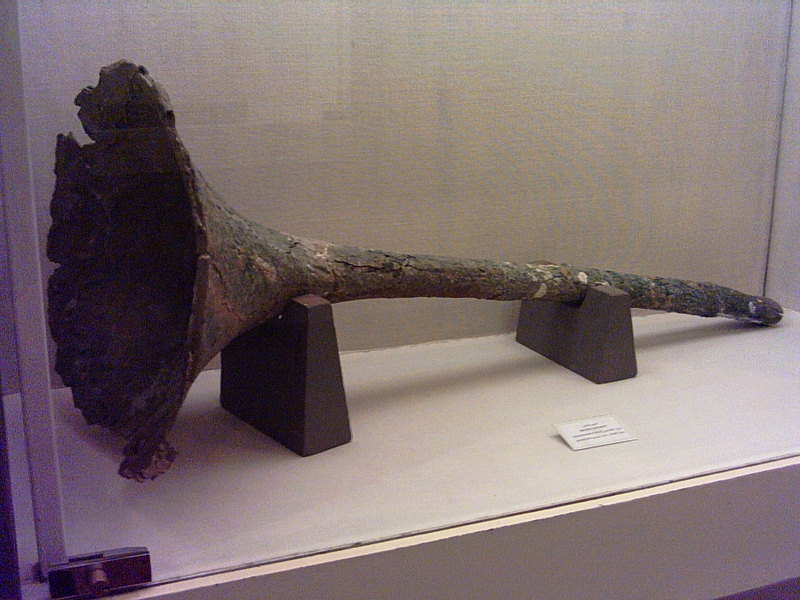
Karna, an ancient Iranian musical instrument from the 6th century BC, kept at the Persepolis Museum.

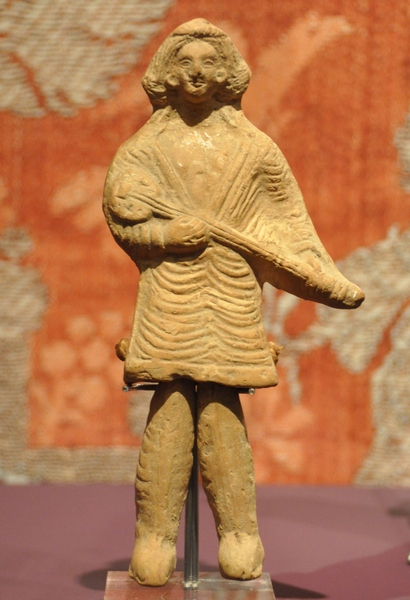
Lute player statue from the time of the Parthian Empire, kept at the Netherlands's Rijksmuseum van Oudheden.

Little is known about music in the classical Iranian empires of the Medes, the Achaemenids, and the Parthians apart from what can be gleaned from the comments of Greek historians. According to Herodotus, the magi, who were a priestly caste in ancient Iran, accompanied their sacrifice rituals with singing. Athenaeus of Naucratis, in his Deipnosophistae, mentions a court singer who had sung a warning to the king of the Median Empire of the plans of Cyrus the Great, who would later establish the Achaemenid dynasty. Athenaeus also notes the capture of singing girls at the court of the last Achaemenid king Darius III (336–330 BC) by Macedonian general Parmenion. Xenophon's Cyropaedia mentions a great number of singing women at the court of the Achaemenid Empire. Under the Parthian Empire, the gōsān (Parthian for "minstrel") had a prominent role in society. They performed for their audiences at royal courts and in public theaters. According to Plutarch's Life of Crassus (32.3), they praised their national heroes and ridiculed their Roman rivals. Likewise, Strabo's Geographica reports that the Parthian youth were taught songs about "the deeds both of the gods and of the noblest men". Parthian songs were later absorbed into the Iranian national epic of Šhāhnāmeh, composed by 10th-century Persian poet Ferdowsi. Šāhnāme itself was based on Xwadāynāmag (Khwaday-Namag), an earlier Middle Persian work, which was an important part of Persian folklore and that is now lost. It is also mentioned in Plutarch's Life of Crassus (23.7) that the Parthians used drums to prepare for battle.

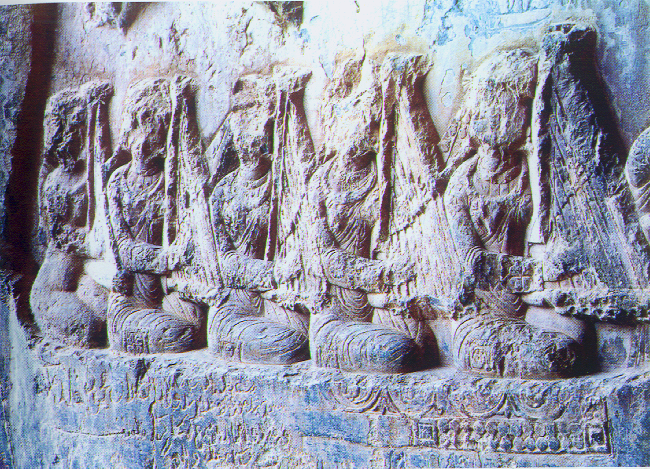
Chang players depicted on a 6th-century Sasanian relief at Taq-e Bostan.

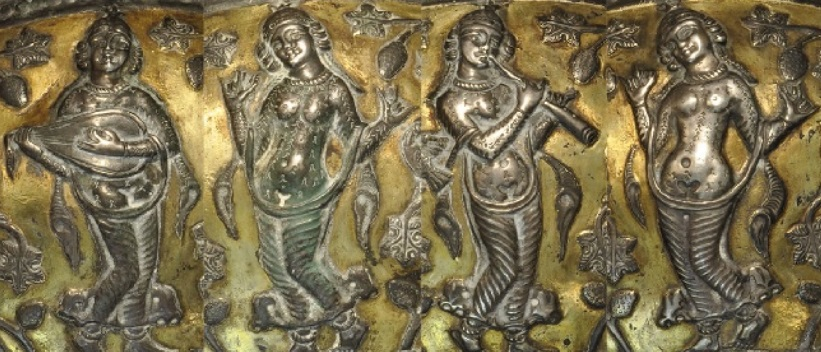
Dancers and musical instrument players depicted on a Sasanian silver bowl from the 5th-7th century AD.

Under the reign of the Sasanians, the Middle Persian term huniyāgar was used to refer to a minstrel. The history of Sasanian music is better documented than earlier periods, and is especially evident in Avestan texts. The recitation of the Sasanian Avestan text of Vendidād has been connected to the Oxus trumpet. The Zoroastrian paradise itself was known as the "House of Song" (garōdmān in Middle Persian), "where music induced perpetual joy". Musical instruments were not accompanied with formal Zoroastrian worship, but they were used in the festivals. Sasanian musical scenes are depicted especially on silver vessels and some wall reliefs.

The reign of Sasanian ruler Khosrow II is regarded as a "golden age" for Persian music. He is shown among his musicians on a large relief at the archaeological site of Taq-e Bostan, holding a bow and arrows himself and standing in a boat amidst a group of harpists. The relief depicts two boats that are shown at "two successive moments within the same panel". The court of Khosrow II hosted a number of prominent musicians, including Azad, Bamshad, Barbad, Nagisa, Ramtin, and Sarkash.

Among these attested names, Barbad is remembered in many documents and has been named as remarkably highly skilled. He was a poet-musician who performed on occasions such as state banquets and the festivals of Nowruz and Mehrgan. He may have invented the lute and the musical tradition that gave rise to dastgah and maqam. He has been credited to have organized a musical system consisting of seven "royal modes" (xosrovāni), 30 derived modes (navā), and 360 melodies (dāstān). These numbers are in accordance with the number of days in a week, month, and year in the Sasanian calendar. The theories these modal systems were based on are not known. However, writers of later periods have left a list of these modes and melodies. Some of them are named after epic figures, such as Kin-e Iraj ("Vengeance of Iraj"), Kin-e Siāvaš ("Vengeance of Siavash"), and Taxt-e Ardašir ("Throne of Ardashir"), some are named in honor of the Sasanian royal court, such as Bāğ-e Širin ("Garden of Shirin"), Bāğ-e Šahryār ("Garden of the Sovereign"), and Haft Ganj ("Seven Treasures"), and some are named after nature, such as Rowšan Čerāğ ("Bright Light").

=== Middle Ages ===
The academic classical music of Iran, in addition to preserving melody types that are attributed to Sasanian musicians, is based on the theories of sonic aesthetics expounded by Avicenna, Farabi, Qotb-ed-Din Shirazi, and Safi-ed-Din Urmawi.

Two prominent Iranian musicians who lived under reign of the third Arab caliphate were Ebrahim Mawseli and his son Eshaq Mawseli. Zaryab of Baghdad, a student of Eshaq, is credited with influencing Spain's classical Andalusian music.

The ninth century Persian poet Rudaki, who lived under the reign of the Samanids, set his own poems to music. At the court of the Persianate Ghaznavid dynasty, who ruled Iran between 977 and 1186, 10th-century Persian poet Farrokhi Sistani composed songs together with songster Andalib and tanbur player Buqi. Lute player Mohammad Barbati and songstress Setti Zarrin-kamar also entertained the Ghaznavid rulers at their court.

=== Modern era ===
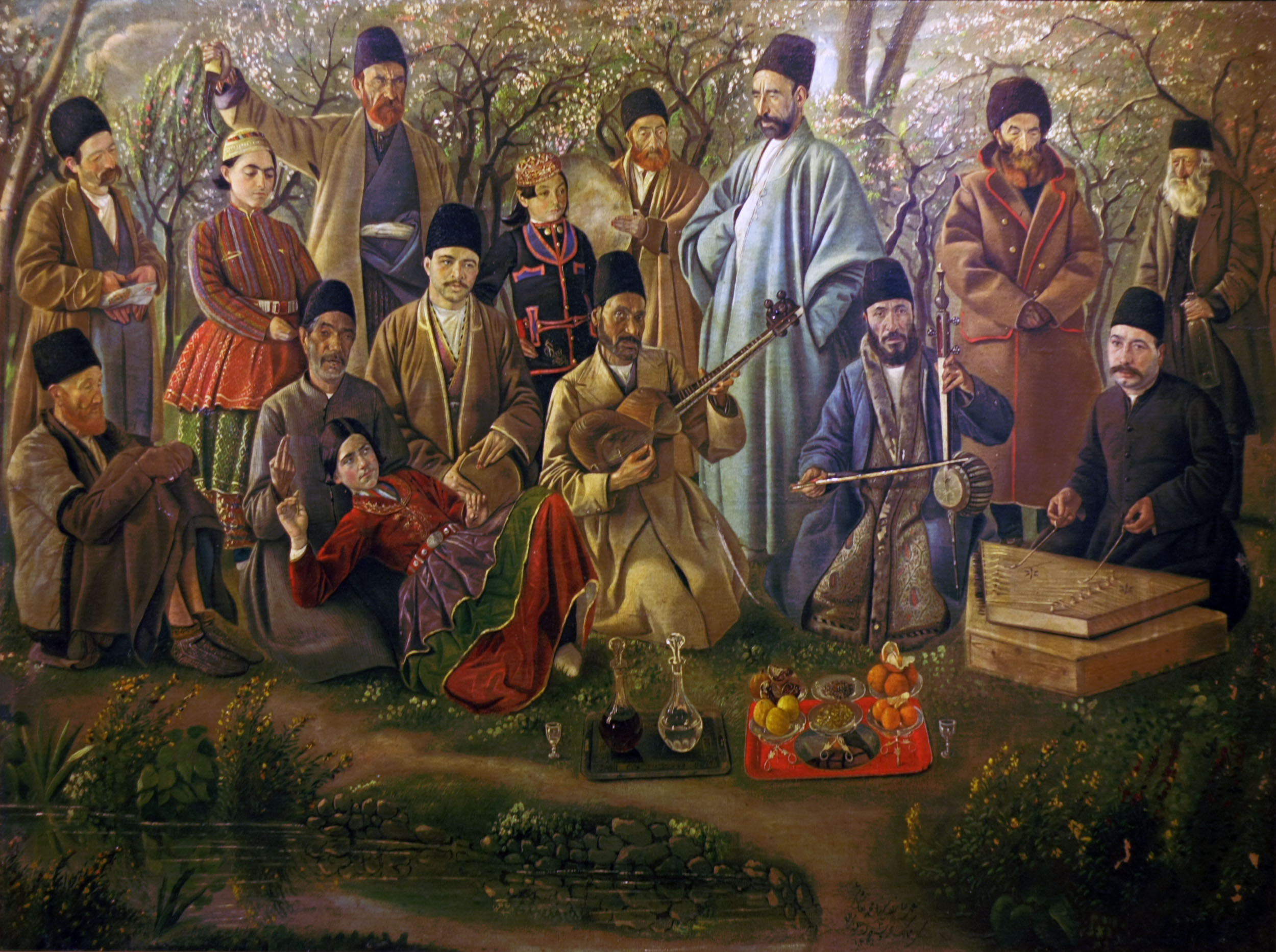
A musical ensemble from the time of Qajar ruler Naser-ed-Din Shah, depicted by Kamal-ol-molk.

Iran's Society for National Music was founded by Khaleqi in 1949.

In the post-medieval era, musical performances continued to be observed and promoted especially through princely courts, Sufi orders, and modernizing social forces. During the Qajar era (1789–1925), Iranian music was renewed through the development of classical melody types (radif), that is the basic repertoire of Iran's classical music, as well as the introduction of modern technologies and principles from the West. Mirza Abdollah, a prominent tar and setar master and one of the most respected court musicians of the late Qajar era, is considered a major influence on the teaching of classical Iranian music in Iran's contemporary conservatories and universities. Radif, the repertoire that he developed in the 19th century, is the oldest documented version of the seven dastgah system, and is regarded as a rearrangement of the older 12 maqam system.

Ali-Naqi Vaziri, a respected player of numerous Iranian and western instruments who studied western musical theory and composition in Europe, was one of the most prominent and influential musicians of the late Qajar and early Pahlavi eras. He established a private music school in 1924, where he also created a school orchestra composed of his students, formed by a combination of the tar and some western instruments. Vaziri then founded an association named Music Club (Kolub-e Musiqi), formed by a number of progressive-minded writers and scholars, where the school orchestra performed concerts that were conducted by himself. He was an extraordinary figure among the Iranian musicians of the 20th century, and his primary goal was to provide music for ordinary citizens through a public arena.

The Tehran Symphony Orchestra (Orkestr-e Samfoni-ye Tehrān) was founded by Gholamhossein Minbashian in 1933. It was reformed by Parviz Mahmoud in 1946, and is currently the oldest and largest symphony orchestra in Iran. Later, Ruhollah Khaleqi, a student of Vaziri, established the Society for National Music (Anjoman-e Musiqi-ye Melli) in 1949. Numerous musical compositions were produced within the parameters of classical Iranian modes, and many involved western musical harmonies. Iranian folkloric songs and poems of both classical and contemporary Iranian poets were incorporated for the arrangement of orchestral pieces that would bear the new influences.

Prior to the 1950s, Iran's music industry was dominated by classical artists. New western influences were introduced into the popular music of Iran by the 1950s, with electric guitar and other imported characteristics accompanying the indigenous instruments and forms, and the popular music developed by the contributions of artists such as Viguen, who was known as the "Sultan" of Iranian pop and jazz music. Viguen was one of Iran's first musicians to perform with a guitar.

Following the 1979 Iranian Revolution, the music industry of Iran went under a strict supervision, and pop music was prohibited for almost two decades. Women were banned from singing as soloists for male audiences. In the 1990s, the new regime began to produce and promote pop music in a new standardized framework, in order to compete with the abroad and unsanctioned sources of Iranian music. Under the presidency of Reformist Khatami, as a result of easing cultural restrictions within Iran, a number of new pop singers emerged from within the country. Since the new administration took office, the Ministry of Ershad adopted a different policy, mainly to make it easier to monitor the industry. The newly adopted policy included loosening restrictions for a small number of artists, while tightening it for the rest. However, the number of album releases increased.

The emergence of Iranian hip hop in the 2000s also resulted in major movements and influences in the music of Iran.

== Genres ==
=== Classical music ===
The classical music of Iran consists of melody types developed through the country's classical and medieval eras. Dastgah, a musical mode in Iran's classical music, despite its popularity, has always been the preserve of the elite. The influence of dastgah is seen as the reservoir of authenticity that other forms of musical genres derive melodic and performance inspiration from.

=== Folk music ===
Iran's folk, ceremonial, and popular songs might be considered "vernacular" in the sense that they are known and appreciated by a major part of the society (as opposed to the art music, which caters for the most part to more elite social classes). The variance of the folk music of Iran has often been stressed, in accordance to the cultural diversity of the country's local and ethnic groups.

Iranian folk songs are categorized in various themes, including those of historical, social, religious, and nostalgic contexts. There are also folk songs that apply to particular occasions, such as weddings and harvests, as well as lullabies, children's songs, and riddles.

There are several traditional specialists of folk music in Iran. Professional folk instrumentalists and vocalists perform at formal events such as weddings. Storytellers (naqqāl; gōsān) would recite epic poetry, such as that of the Šāhnāme, using traditional melodic forms, interspersing with spoken commentary, which is a practice found also in Central Asian and Balkan traditions. The bakshy (baxši), wandering minstrels who play the dotar, entertain their audiences at social gatherings with romantic ballads about warriors and warlords. There are also lament singers (rowze-xān), who recite verses that would commemorate the martyrdom of religious figures.

Iranian singers of both classical and folk music may improvise the lyric and the melody within the proper musical mode. Many Iranian folk songs have the potential of being adapted into major or minor tonalities, and therefore, a number of Iranian folk songs were arranged for orchestral accompaniment.

Many of Iran's old folkloric songs were revitalized through a project developed by the Institute for the Intellectual Development of Children and Young Adults, a cultural and educational institute that was founded under the patronage of Empress Farah Pahlavi in 1965. They were produced in a collection of quality recordings, performed by professional vocalists such as Pari Zangeneh, Monir Vakili, and Minu Javan, and were highly influential in Iran's both folk and pop music productions.

=== Symphonic music ===
Ali Rahbari conducting Jeunesse Musicale de Téhéran, in 1974.

Iran's symphonic music, as observed in the modern times, was developed by the late Qajar and early Pahlavi periods. In addition to instrumental compositions, some of Iran's symphonic pieces are based on the country's folk songs, and some are based on poetry of both classical and contemporary Iranian poets.

Symphonische Dichtungen aus Persien ("Symphonic Poems from Persia"), a collection of Persian symphonic works, was performed by the German Nuremberg Symphony Orchestra and conducted by Iranian conductor Ali Rahbari in 1980.

Loris Tjeknavorian, an acclaimed Iranian Armenian composer and conductor, composed Rostam and Sohrab, an opera with Persian libretto that is based on the tragedy of Rostam and Sohrab from Iran's long epic poem Shahnameh, in over two decades. It was first performed by the Tehran Symphony Orchestra at Tehran's Roudaki Hall in December 2003. Alexander Rahbari is an important conductor and composer who has more than 250 published albums and conducted more than 450 orchestras, he is now conductor of Mariinsky theatre's Orchestra

In 2005, the Persepolis Orchestra (Melal Orchestra) played a piece that dates back 3000 years. The notes of this piece, which were discovered among some ancient inscriptions, were deciphered by archaeologists and are believed to have belonged to the Sumerians and the ancient Greeks. Renowned Iranian musician Peyman Soltani conducted the orchestra.

In the 21st century, contemporary Iranian symphonic music has increasingly intersected with European avant-garde and iranioan school traditions. Among the prominent composers actively creating and performing orchestral works within this realm are Alireza Mashayekhi, Mehdi Hosseini, Reza Vali, and Behzad Ranjbaran. In particular, Mehdi Hosseini has emerged as a key figure in this movement, utilizing extensive ethnomusicological research into regional Iranian folk music as a structural framework for his pieces.

=== Pop music ===
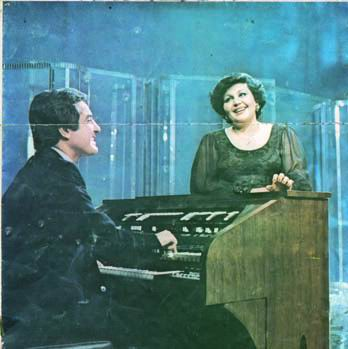
Hayedeh and Anoushiravan Rohani on the Iranian National Television, in 1975.

Following the emergence of radio during the late Qajar era, a form of popular music was formed and began to develop in Iran. Later, the arrival of new western influences, such as the use of the guitar and other western instruments, marked a turning point in Iran's popular music by the 1950s. Iranian pop music is commonly performed by vocalists who are accompanied with elaborate ensembles, often using a combination of both indigenous Iranian and European instruments.

Iranian pop music is largely promoted through mass media, but it experienced some decade of prohibition after the 1979 Revolution. Public performances were also banned, but they have been occasionally permitted since 1990. The pop music of Iranian diasporan communities has also been significant.

=== Jazz and blues music ===
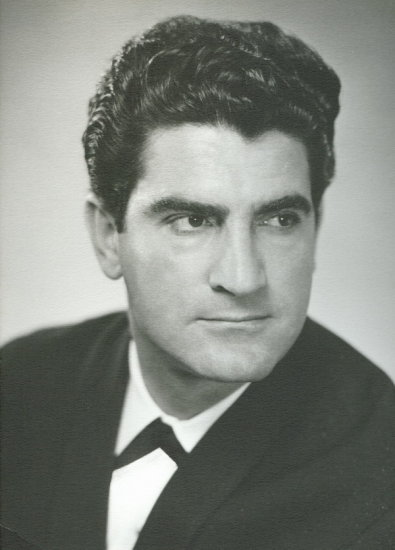
Viguen, Iran's "Sultan" of pop and jazz music.

Jazz music was introduced into Iran's popular music by the emergence of artists such as Viguen, who was known as Iran's "Sultan of Jazz". Viguen's first song, Moonlight, which was released in 1954, was an instant hit on the radio and is considered highly influential.

Indigenous Iranian elements, such as classical musical forms and poetry, have also been incorporated into Iranian jazz. Rana Farhan, an Iranian jazz and blues singer living in New York, combines classical Persian poetry with modern jazz and blues. Her best-known work, Drunk With Love, is based on a poem by prominent 13th-century Persian poet Rumi. Jazz and blues artists who work in post-revolutionary Iran have also gained popularity.

=== Rock music ===
Rock music was introduced into Iran's popular music by the 1960s, together with the emergence of other Western European and American musical genres. It soon became popular among the young generation, especially at the nightclubs of Tehran. In post-revolutionary Iran, many rock music artists are not officially sanctioned and have to rely on the Internet and underground scenes.

In 2008, power metal band Angband signed with German record label Pure Steel Records as the first Iranian metal band to release internationally through a European label. They had collaborations with well-known producer Achim Köhler.

=== Hip hop ===
Iranian hip hop emerged from the capital, Tehran, by the 2000s. It started with underground artists recording mixtapes influenced by the American hip hop culture, and was later combined with elements from the indigenous Iranian musical forms.

=== A cappella ===
Iranian A cappella (music without instrument) in 2011 with a new type was first introduced by Damour Vocal Band led by Faraz Khosravi Danesh. This genre of music has been performed as a choir in the past, but since 2011 it has become such that the human larynx has replaced musical instruments. Various groups, including the Tehran Vocal Ensemble, began to operate after that, and this style of music flowed in a creative and new way in the Iranian A cappella music.

== International recognitions of Iranian music ==
The following are a number of notable internationally awarded Iranian musical works.

=== 2013 ===
- Mohammad Motamedi: Radio France prize winner-2013

=== 2008 ===
- Loris Tjeknavorian: Austria's Cross of Honor for Science and Art First Class (2008).

=== 2007 ===
- Asia Society has awarded Shahram Nazeri by the prestigious Lifetime Cultural Heritage Award along with Secretary General of United Nations in November 2007.
- Mozart Medal, Mohammad Reza Shajarian.
- Légion d'honneur, Shahram Nazeri.
- Grammy Award (nomination), Endless Vision, and Hossein Alizadeh.

=== 2006 ===
- Grammy Award (nomination), Faryad album, Masters of Persian Music.
- Grammy Award, Ali Shirazinia, Shahram Tayyebi, and Deep Dish.
- Grammy Award for Best Orchestral Performance (nomination), Persian Trilogy by Behzad Ranjbaran.
- "Best Middle Eastern Song" & "Best Middle Eastern Album", 2006 JPF Awards: Andy Madadian.
- "2006 Best International Armenian Album Award", 2006 Armenian Music Awards: City of Angels by Andy Madadian.
- 3 tan band. J.F.K Awards 2006 For Best eastern rock song "A Drop Of Alcohol".

=== 2005 ===
- Golden Lioness Award for Classical-Best Vocal Ability, The World Academy of Arts, Literature, and Media: Akbar Golpa
- Golden Lioness Award for Classical-Arrange & Pop, The World Academy of Arts, Literature, and Media: Hassan Sattar
- Golden Lioness Award for Best Instrumentalist, The World Academy of Arts, Literature, and Media: Muhammad Heidari
- Golden Lioness Award for Classic-pop, The World Academy of Arts, Literature, and Media: Mahasti
- Golden Lioness Award for Classical Performance, The World Academy of Arts, Literature, and Media: Hooshmand Aghili
- Golden Lioness Award for Classical Performance, The World Academy of Arts, Literature, and Media: Shakila.
- UNESCO music award (Picasso award), nominee: Mohammad Reza Darvishi.
- "Best Unsigned U.K. Hip Hop Artist, Riddla:

=== 2003 ===
- Grand Prix du Disque for World Music, Dastan ensemble and Parisa.
- BBC Awards for World Music, Kayhan Kalhor.

=== 2001 ===
- NAV's best contemporary world music album: Axiom of Choice (band).
- Best Recombinant World Music Ensemble in 2001 by the LA Weekly Music Awards. (nomination): Axiom of choice band.

=== 2000 ===
- Orville H. Gibson Award, Lily Afshar.

=== 1999 ===
- Picasso Medal, Mohammad Reza Shajarian.
- Pikanes award, Thailand's most prestigious music award for an outstanding orchestral performance: Shahrdad Rohani.

=== 1977 ===
- Prestigious Gold Medal at the Besançon International Conductors' Competition, Ali Rahbari.
- Silver medal in Geneva International Conducting Competition, Ali Rahbari.

=== Others ===
- Rudolf Nissim Award, Behzad Ranjbaran.
- Grand Prize in the Aspen Music Festival Guitar Competition, Lily Afshar.
- Top Prize in the Guitar Foundation of America Competition, Lily Afshar.
- Loris Tjeknavorian, Homayoon Order and Medal for the composition of "Son et Lumiere Persepolis 2500"

== See also ==
- List of Iranian musicians
- List of Iranian singers
- List of Iranian composers
- Shiraz Arts Festival
- Religious music in Iran
- Iranian folk music
- Iranian women and Persian music
