= Four Seasons Guitar Quartet =

Four Seasons Guitar Quartet کوارتت گیتار کلاسیک چهار فصل
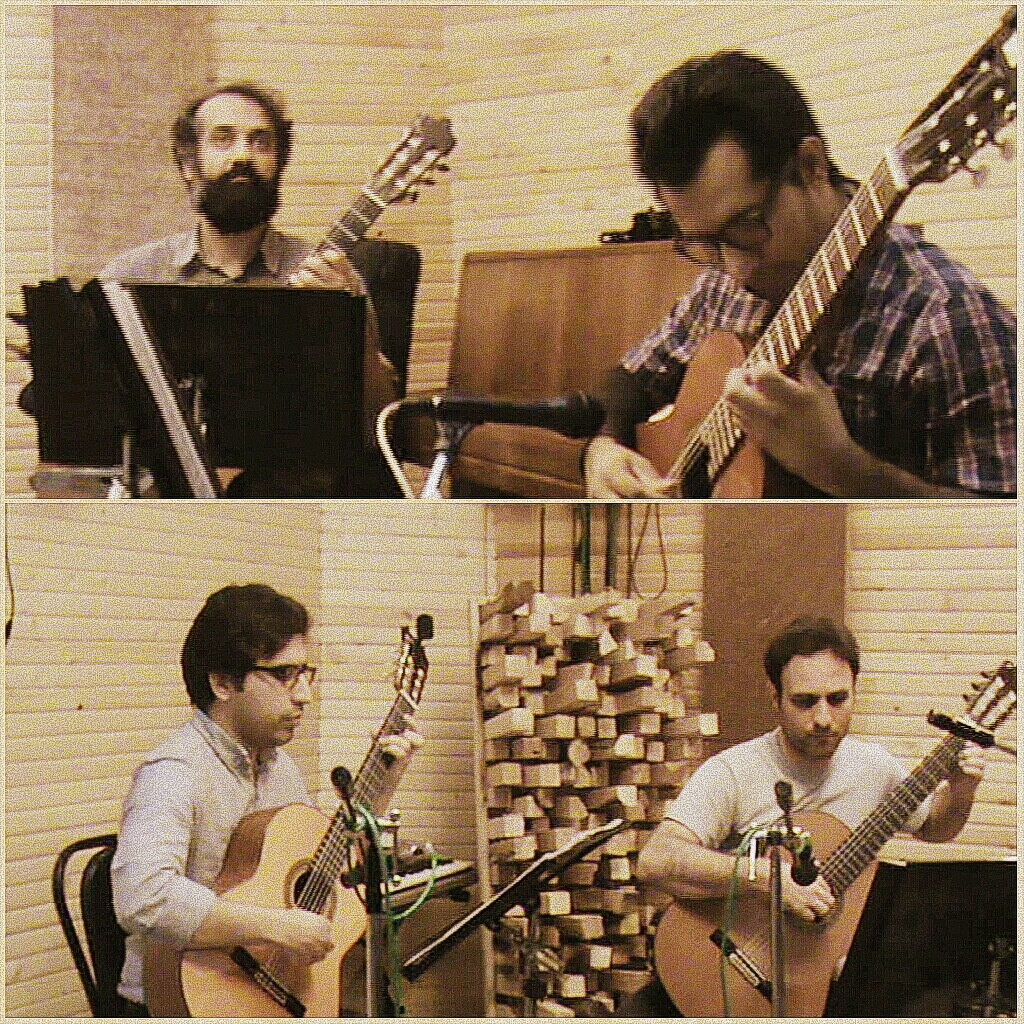
- Recording "One two three four" album

Background information
- Origin: Ahvaz, Iran
- Genres: Contemporary classical, chamber
- Years active: 2010–present
- Members: Vahid Vahidpour; Fereydoon Vaziri; Farokh Karnama; Adel Shahandeh

Four Seasons Guitar Quartet (Persian: کوارتت گیتار کلاسیک چهار فصل) is an Iranian ensemble formed in 2010. It consists of Vahid Vahidpour, Fereydoon Vaziri, Adel Shahandeh and Farokh Karnama. Some of their repertoire consists of their arrangements.

== Discography ==
- One Two Three Four, Release date, March 17, 2015: the album contained two suite and five pieces which three of them has been arranged by Adel Shahandeh and one by Farokh Karnama for guitar quartet ensemble.

== Activities ==
- performing in the 27th Fajr International Music Festival in 2012
- performing in the 28th Fajr International Music Festival in 2013
- performing in the 30th Fajr International Music Festival in 2015
- performing at Faculty of Arts and Architecture, Azad University of Tehran in 2012
- performing at Tehran Roudaki Hall in 2012 (Classical guitar workshop week)
- performing in the 11th Khuzestan music festival as guest
- and performing several concerts in Ahvaz
