= Sasanian culture =

"Sasanian culture" is the culture of the Sasanian Empire and may refer to:

- Sasanian architecture
- Sasanian music
