= Mina Jafari =

Mina Jafari مینا جعفری
- Genres: Choir
- Website: https://web.archive.org/web/20250704204356/http://www.mina-jafari.ir/en/

Mina Jafari (Persian: مینا جعفری) is an Iranian chorister. She began her work with Tehran Symphony Orchestra and went on to be part of several large choirs like National Orchestra Choir and Damour Vocal Band led by Faraz Khosravi Danesh. Her work as a female singer in Iran was seen as groundbreaking at the time, she and her choir performed on national television which was known as "breaking yet another taboo" by the media as women are not allowed to sing in Islam, the official religion of Iran. Her performance made way for more female choirs to perform on national television.

She was part of the Avaye Mahan choir in Asia Pacific Choir Games 2017 in Sri Lanka and performed with Tehran Symphony Orchestra in Italy.

Her Album with the Damour Vocal Band was released internationally, and ever since her performance she has performed in Iranian national TV with different choirs.
