= National Festival of Youth Music =

- Genre: Iranian folk and classical music
- Location(s): Tehran, Iran
- Years active: 1999–present
- Website: javanmusicfestival.com

The National Festival of Youth Music (Persian: جشنوارهٔ موسیقی جوان), is a music festival in Iran that highlights Iranian music performed by young musicians.

The festival took place for the first time in December 1999. Since then, it has been taking place seasonally at several halls in Tehran, including the Roudaki Hall, organized by the Iran Music Association, the House of Music, the Music Office of the Ministry of Dance , and the Rudaki Foundation.

== See also ==
- Musicema Awards
- Fajr International Music Festival
