= Mehdi Bozorgmehr =

Mehdi Bozorgmehr مهدی بزرگمهر
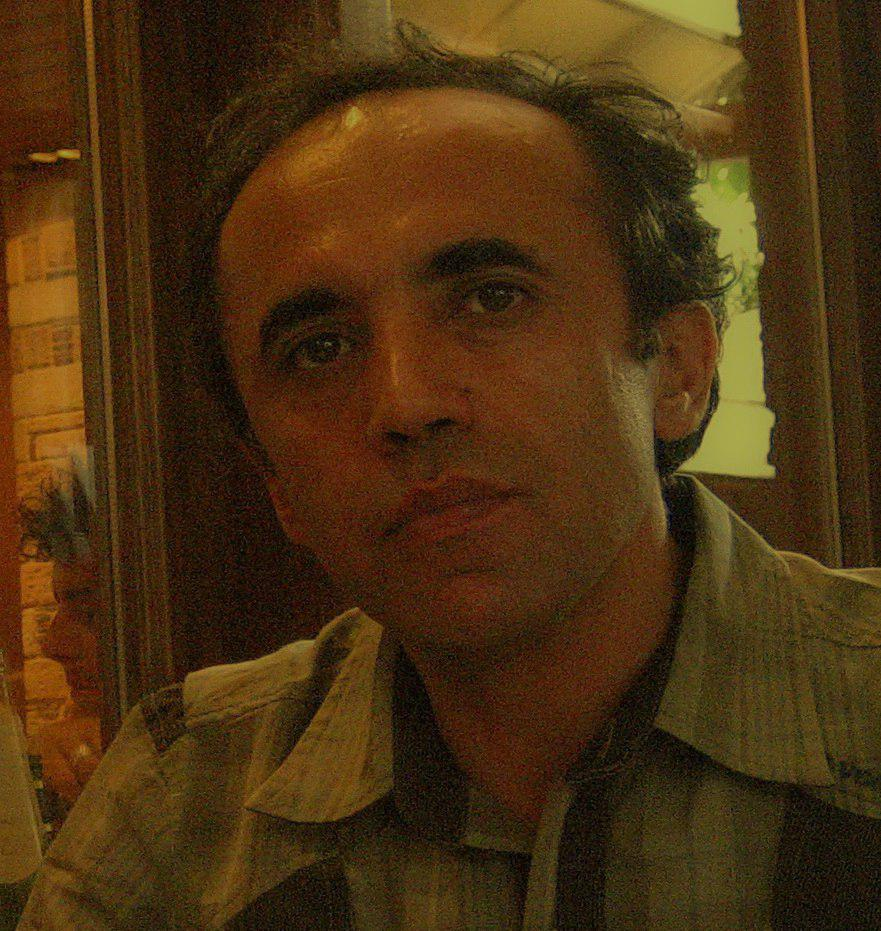
- Mehdi Bozorgmehr in The Vahdat Hall (2013)

Background information
- Born: Tehran, Iran
- Genres: Persian symphonic music; Film score; contemporary classical music; post-romanticism
- Occupation: composer
- Instrument: Piano
- Years active: 1993

Mehdi Bozorgmehr (Persian: مهدی بزرگمهر; born in Tehran, Iran) is an Iranian musician and composer.

== Biography ==
Mehdi Bozorgmehr was born in Tehran, Iran. He is a prolific composer of symphonic, choral, ensemble, arranger, children music, and film score. His current positions in Iran include:

- A member of the Committee of Composers and Orchestra Leaders at the Khane Music (Iran's top music centre).
- A member and secretary of the Iranian Association of Film Composers at the Khane Cinema (Iran's top cinema centre)
- A member of the Academy of Iranian Cinema Referees at the Khane Cinema

He started music by playing piano and then took private classes with Kambiz Roshanravan, a renowned Iranian composer, learning music theories, harmony, Counterpoint, form, analysis, and composition. He professionally worked as a composer in 1993 and released five albums of rhymes and songs for children. He then worked as a composer with Tehran Symphony Orchestra, the national radio and television, movies, television series and animation.

== Compositions ==
Mehdi Bozorgmehr composes classical music, symphonies, quintets, quartets, trios, piano and ensemble for symphony orchestras. His works include:

- Symphony No 1 (Path of Fire)
- Suite Symphonic No 1 (Epic)
- Concerto for cello and orchestra (Shining)
- Concerto for flute and string orchestra (Green Lines)
- Concerto for piano and string orchestra (Flight)
- Concerto for violin and string orchestra (The First Love)
- String quartets No 1 and 2
- 12 pieces for piano and voice (Tale of thy Tress)
- Trio for violin, cello and piano
- Trio for flute, bassoon and harp
- Duets for cello and piano; violin and piano; clarinet and piano; flute and piano; piccolo and piano; soprano solo and piano
- Composing music for Iran's classic poetry such as that of Khayyam, Rumi, Bedil Dehlavi, Hafez, Saadi Shirazi and others.

== Film and television scoring ==
- 2009 – The Maryam's Report
- 2005 – Internet Adventures
- 2003 – Wild Sunflowers

== Studio albums ==
- "Setareha Bidar Shin" Music for children's Institute for the Intellectual Development of Children and Young Adults
- "Madar" Music for children's (Institute for the Intellectual Development of Children and Young Adults)

== Books ==
- "Symphony no. 5" (by : Ludwig van Beethoven) arrangement for piano, Part Publication.
- Tale of thy Trees (12 Pieces for voice and Piano) Chang Publication.

== Awards ==
He has also attended in music festivals and won two composing prizes from The 13th Fajr International Music Festival, the country's top music competition, and The 2nd Mehr Music Festival.
