= Soheil Nasseri =

American pianist who resides in Berlin and New York City (born 1979)

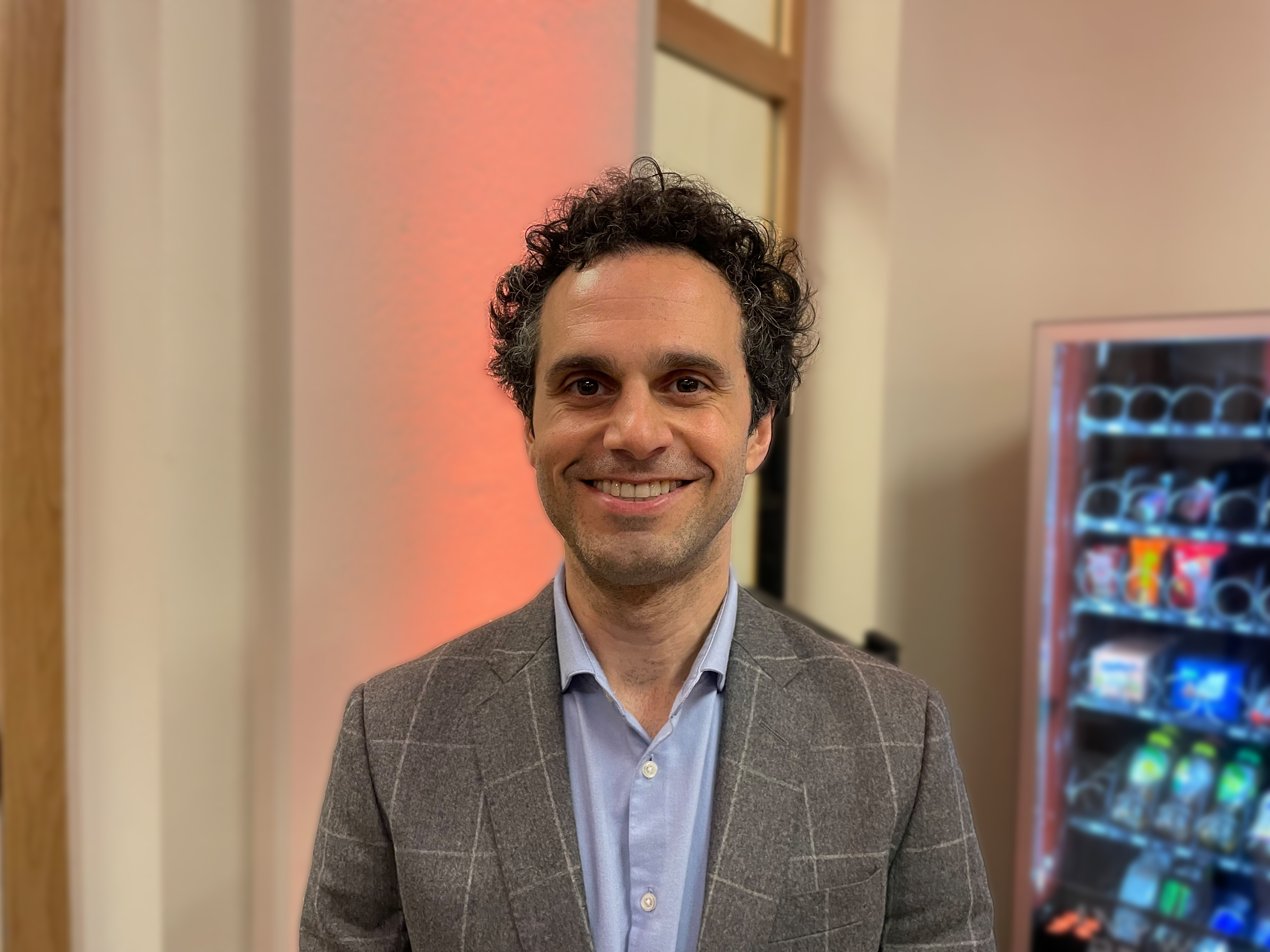
Soheil Nasseri, 2023

Soheil Nasseri (born 1979) is an American pianist who resides in Berlin, Germany and New York City.

== Concerts ==
Nasseri has premiered over two dozen works by contemporary composers since 2001. Notably, he performed the world premiere of Kaikhosru Shapurji Sorabji's Sonata No. 0 (1917) at Carnegie Hall in 2002, and made the first commercial recording of it. He has also performed music by the Iranian composer Hormoz Farhat.
