= Maria Baghramian =

Irish philosopher (born 1954)

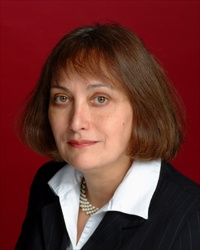
- Born: 21 March 1954 (age 72); Tehran, Iran
- Spouse: Hormoz Farhat (died 2021)

Education
- Education: Trinity College Dublin
- Doctoral advisor: Timothy Williamson

Philosophical work
- Era: Contemporary philosophy
- Region: Western philosophy
- School: Analytic philosophy
- Main interests: Epistemology, relativism, American 20th-century philosophy, philosophy of language

Maria Baghramian (born 21 March 1954) is a philosopher and historian of philosophy. She is Full Professor of Philosophy in the School of Philosophy, University College Dublin (UCD) and Professor II, at Department of Philosophy, University of Oslo (2023-2026). She was elected a member of the Royal Irish Academy (RIA) in 2010 and a member of Academia Europaea in 2022. Baghramian has published twelve authored and edited books as well as articles and book chapters on topics in epistemology and twentieth century American Philosophy. She was the Chief Editor of the International Journal of Philosophical Studies (IJPS) from 2003 to 2013. She was the co-editor of Contemporary Pragmatism (2014–2022).

== Education and career ==
Baghramian graduated from Queen's University Belfast in Philosophy and Social Anthropology (1983) with a Double First. She received a PhD from Trinity College Dublin (TCD) in Philosophy of Logic under the supervision of Timothy Williamson (1990). Baghramian has taught in TCD and since 1990 in UCD. She was the Head of the School of Philosophy (2011–2013, 2017–2019) and a co-director of the Post Graduate Programme in Cognitive Science at University College Dublin, UCD (since 2000). She is the founder of the Society for Women in Philosophy (SWIP) – Ireland (2010) and was the president for two terms. She was a Fulbright Scholar in 2013–14 and been a visiting fellow in Harvard, MIT, and Institut Jean Nicod, École normale supérieure, in Paris. She has also been a frequent visiting lecturer in China, where she was adviser to China Association of Philosophy of Language and in Armenia, where she also contributes to the Yerevan Academy of Linguistics and Philosophy. In 2018, Baghramian was elected to the Steering Committee of the International Federation of Philosophical Societies (2018-2024), and in 2019 to the Programme Committee of the 25th World Congress of Philosophy to be held in Rome in 2024. In 2021 she was elected a Member of the International Institute of Philosophy. Baghramian was the recipient of the Highly Commended Researcher of the Year Award, Irish Research Council in 2022. Baghramian was a Fellow at the Swedish Collegium for Advanced Study in April and May 2024.

== Philosophy ==
Baghramian's publications focus on topics from contemporary epistemology, including relativism and the problem of intractable disagreements, to topics on trust and expertise. She also publishes on contemporary American philosophy, particularly on Quine, Putnam, Davidson and Rorty.

== Research projects ==
Baghramian was the principal investigator of a research project on the American Voice in Philosophy with funding from the Irish Research Council and the Society for the Advancement of American Philosophy. In 2015, she was awarded an Irish Research Council New Horizons funding for the interdisciplinary project on peer expert disagreement 'When Experts Disagree' (WEXD), where her co-investigator was the astrophysicist Luke Drury. Through her membership of the Royal Irish Academy, Baghramian has been an active participant of a British Academy/ALLEA working group on Truth, Trust and Expertise. Three working papers by the groups were published in 2018 and 2019. She was also a member of a SAPEA advisory group, responsible for a report to the European Commission's Science Advisory Mechanism on Making Sense of Science Under Conditions of Uncertainty and Complexity published in 2019. In July 2019, Baghramian was awarded three million euro grant by the European Commission for a research project on "the role of science in policy decision making and the conditions under which people should trust and rely on expert opinion that shapes public policy." The project Policy, Expertise and Trust in Action (PEriTiA) ran from 2020 to 2023 and had partners from universities and academies in the UK, France, the Netherlands, Germany, Poland, Italy and Armenia. She is a current member of SIDEM, Science and Democracy research Project at the University of Oslo.

== Personal life ==
Maria Baghramian was born in Tehran, Iran, in an Armenian family but moved to Ireland in 1979 where she has continued to live with her husband, the composer and ethnomusicologist Hormoz Farhat. Their son, Robert Farhat, is a talent developer and programme manager with the London Jazz Festival.

== Selected publications ==
- Testimonial Injustice and Trust. Eds. with M. Altanian. London/New York: Routledge. 2023.
- Questioning Experts and Expertise. Eds. with C. Martini. Routledge: 2022.
- The Value of Empathy. Eds. with M. Papazian and R. Stout. Routledge. 2020.
- Baghramian, Maria; Coliva, Annalisa (30 September 2019). Relativism. Routledge. doi:10.4324/9780429343308. hdl:11380/1200715. ISBN 978-0-429-34330-8.
- The Virtues of Relativism. Proceedings of the Aristotelian Society. Supplementary Volumes, XCIII.
- From Trust to Trustworthiness, (Ed.) (2019). Routledge.
- Special Issues on Expertise and Expert Knowledge: Social Philosophy. With Martini, C. 2018, 2019. Taylor and Francis Volume 32, Issue 6. Volume 33, Issue 2.
- Divergent Perspectives on Expert Disagreement: Preliminary Evidence from Climate Science, Climate Policy, Astrophysics, and Public Opinion, Environmental Communication. With Luke Drury, James R Beebe, Finnur Delsén. 2018. DOI:10.1080/17524032.2018.1504099.
- Special Issue on Trust. 2018. International Journal of Philosophical Studies 26(2):135-138.
- Pragmatism and the European traditions: Encounters with analytical philosophy and phenomenology before the Great Divide. Eds. with S. Marchetti. 2017. Routledge.
- Philosophy in the Twentieth Century: The Mingled Story of Three Revolutions. With S. Marchetti (2-17). Pragmatism and the European Traditions. 10–30. Routledge.
- Comments on Annalisa Coliva, Extended Rationality: A Hinge Epistemology. 2017. International Journal for the Study of Skepticism 2017(7):1-9.
- Quine, Naturalised Meaning and Empathy. 2016. Augmenta, 2(1):25-41.
- Hilary Putnam and Relativism. 2015. In James D. Wright (Ed.). Encyclopedia of Social and Behavioral Sciences. Wiley.
- Richard Rorty. 2015. With F. McHugh. In James D. Wright (Ed.). Encyclopedia of Social and Behavioral Sciences. Wiley.
- Baghramian, Maria; Carter, J. Adam (11 September 2015). "Relativism". Stanford Encyclopedia of Philosophy..
- Contemporary Pragamtism. 2014–2019. Eds. with John Shook. Volume 10–14. Brill.
- The Depths and Shallows of Style in Philosophy. 2014. Journal of Philosophical Research, 39:311-323.
- The Many Faces of Relativism (Ed.). .2014. London/New York: Taylor and Francis.
- Donald Davidson: Life and Words (Ed.). 2013. London/New York: Routledge.
- Reading Putnam (Ed.). 2012. London/New York: Routledge.
- Relativism: The Problems of Philosophy Series. 2004. London/New York: Routledge.
- Pluralism: The Philosophy and Politics of Diversity. With Atracta Ingram (Ed.). 2000. London/New York: Routledge. Translated into Chinese
- Modern Philosophy of Language. 1999. London: J.M. Dent 1998 and Washington: Counterpoint 1999.
- Gundersen, Torbjørn; Alinejad, Donya; Branch, T.Y.; Duffy, Bobby; Hewlett, Kirstie; Holst, Cathrine; Owens, Susan; Panizza, Folco; Tellmann, Silje Maria; van Dijck, José; Baghramian, Maria (17 October 2022). "A New Dark Age? Truth, Trust, and Environmental Science". Annual Review of Environment and Resources. 47 (1): 5–29. doi:10.1146/annurev-environ-120920-015909. hdl:10852/99734. ISSN 1543-5938.
