= Contemporary Pragmatism =

- Discipline: Philosophy
- Language: English
- Edited by: John R. Shook, Maria Baghramian

Publication details
- History: 2004–present
- Publisher: Brill Publishers
- Frequency: Quarterly

Standard abbreviations
- ISO 4: Contemp. Pragmatism

Indexing
- ISSN: 1572-3429 (print); 1875-8185 (web)

Links
- Journal homepage

Contemporary Pragmatism is a quarterly peer-reviewed academic journal covering discussions of applying pragmatism, broadly understood, to today's issues. The journal was established in 2004 and was published by Rodopi Publishers. The editor-in-chief is John R. Shook (Center for Inquiry Transnational) and Maria Baghramian. The journal is affiliated with the International Pragmatism Society.

It is now published by Brill Publishers.
