= Fajr International Music Festival =

- Genre: Pop, Rock, Classic, A Cappella, Persian Music
- Locations: Tehran, Iran
- Years active: 1986–present
- Website: fajrmusicfestival.com

Fajr International Music Festival (Persian: جشنوارهٔ موسیقی فجر) is Iran's most prestigious Music Festival founded in 1986. The festival is affiliated with UNESCO and includes national and international competition sections.

Since its establishment, many musicians from several countries like Austria, Germany, France participated in the event. The festival have enjoyed a strong presence of Asian countries as well.

The 22nd Fajr International Music Festival was held in January 2007. The annual event was attended by 1,200 domestic and foreign artists performing different pieces in various categories International and Folk Music, Classical Music and Youth and Women Music. A total of 126 performances were made during the 10-day festival.

== 27th Festival ==
=== Winners of Music Composition Section ===
- Leyli Mohammad Nosrati for Suite Symphony
- Hamid Moradian for Mooye Kamancheh

=== Winners of Choir Competitive Section ===
- Damour Vocal Band Led by Faraz Khosravi Danesh
- Avaye Mahan Group Led by Nima Fatehi
- Samat Group Led by Azadeh Azimi

== 24th Festival: Dec, 2008, Tehran Iran ==
=== Winners of Music Composition Section ===
- Nima Hamidi for String Quartet No.1 "Obur"
- Amir-Sadeq Kanjani for "Iranian,"
- Afarin Mansouri for "Fallen Soldier"
- Saman Samadi for "Night Broker,"
- Sara Lesan for "Motion Continues,"
- Amir-Bahador Sadafian for "Mr. Winter Died."

== 21st Festival ==
=== Plaques of honor ===
- Mahmud Farahmand
- Yusef Purya
- Khosro Rahimian, and violist
- Fereidun Zarrinbal
- Yusef Ashrafi
- Maziar Heidari
- Shahram Tavakkoli

=== Golden Chang ===
- Herbert Karimi-Masihi
- Morris Erisco

== 16th Festival ==
=== Golden Chang ===
- Loris Tjeknavorian

== 13st Festival ==
=== Winners of Music Composition Section ===
- Shahram Mazloumi
- Mehdi Bozorgmehr
- Amir Moeeni and Mitra Basiri

== 10th Festival ==
=== Plaques of honor ===
- Parichehr Khajeh
- Sara Tavasoli
- Nakisa Karimian
- Farangis Moussavi
- Mahsa Ghassemi

== 9th Festival ==
=== Golden Chang ===
- Sina Sarlak

== 8th Festival ==
=== Golden Chang ===
- Bahram Osqueezadeh

== See also ==
- National Festival of Youth Music
- Fajr International Film Festival
