= Damour Vocal Band =

Damour Vocal Band گروه آوازی دامور
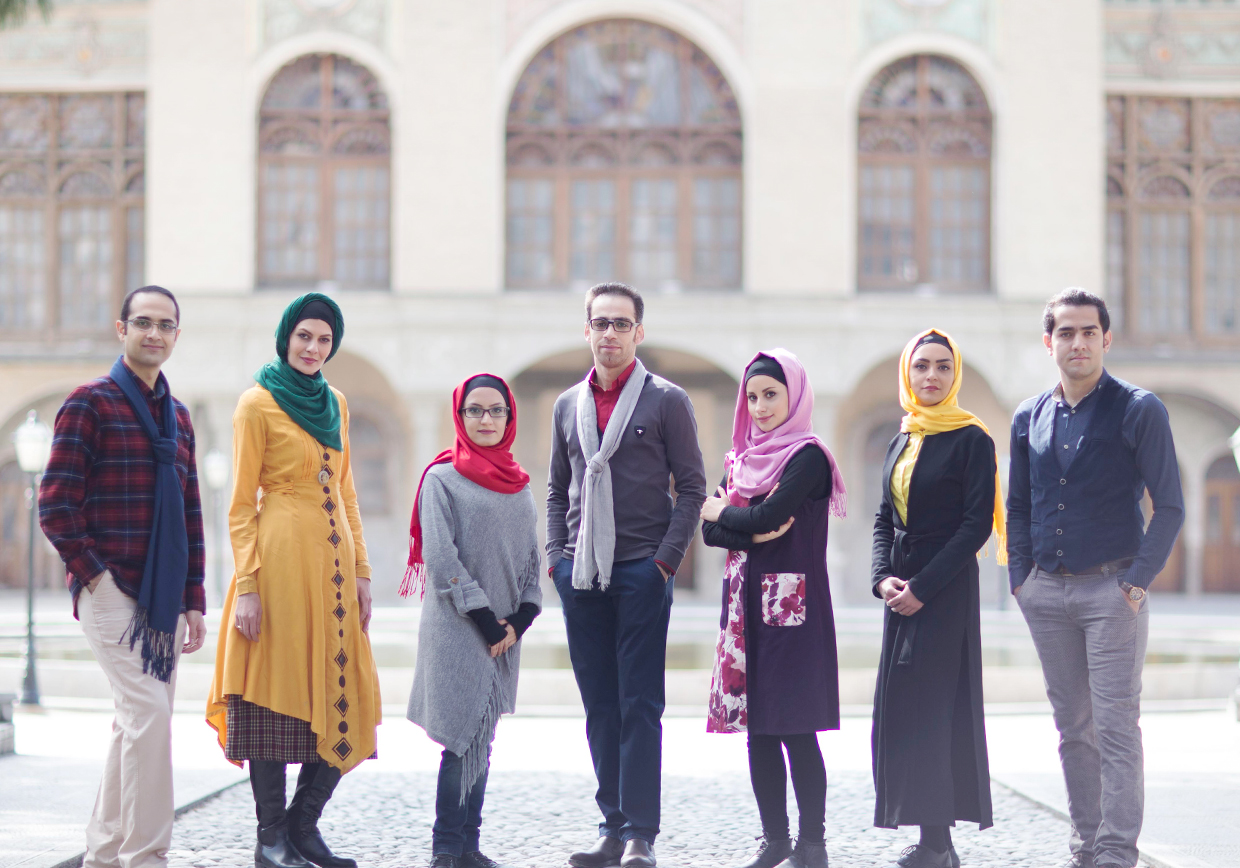

Background information
- Origin: Tehran, Iran
- Genres: A cappella
- Years active: 2011-present
- Labels: Avaye Musighi Rata - Navay-e-Mahan
- Members: Ghazal Aklili - Ehda Moslehi - Mina Jafari - Foroogh Fazli - Mahmoud Rahmani - Sepand Elahi - Ata Hakkak - Faraz Khosravi Danesh
- Website: Official Website

Damour Vocal Band (Persian: گروه آوازی دامور) is an Iranian A cappella music group co-founded by Faraz Khosravi Danesh and Ata Hakkak in 2011.

== Background ==
Damour Vocal Band was a successful experience for its members, especially for Khosravi Danesh who was the leader and composer of the band. The A cappella band effectively introduced the genre to the Iranian audience. Performing on national TV and winning different awards. But what makes the band stand out is that it provided a legal framework for women to sing, in a country where singing for women is prohibited.

== Awards ==
- Winner of the 27th Fajr International Music Festival of Iran
- Nominee for the best compilation music album of Barbad Award.
- Winner of the best biennial album of Iranian House of Music
