= Hormoz Farhat =

Iranian-American composer and ethnomusicologist (1928–2021)

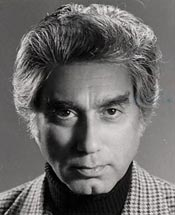
- Farhat in 1977 in Tehran
- Born: 9 August 1928; Tehran, Imperial State of Persia (now Iran)
- Died: 16 August 2021 (aged 93); Dublin, Ireland
- Spouse: Maria Baghramian

Academic background
- Education: UCLA; Mills College

Academic work
- Discipline: Persian traditional music
- Institutions: University of Tehran; Trinity College Dublin
- Notable works: List of compositions The Dastgah Concept in Persian Music (1990); List of publications

Hormoz Farhat (Persian: هرمز فرهت; 9 August 1928 – 16 August 2021) was an Iranian-American composer and ethnomusicologist who spent much of his career in Dublin, Ireland. An emeritus professor of music, he was a fellow of Trinity College, Dublin. Described by the Irish Times as a "gifted and distinctive composer of contemporary classical music," his compositions include orchestral, concertante, piano and choral music, as well string quartets and chamber works. He also wrote numerous film scores, including that of Dariush Mehrjui's 1969 film The Cow. However, his musicological research dominates his legacy; his writings on the music of Iran—a country which he insisted be called 'Persia'—were pivotal in ethnomusicology, particularly his acclaimed 1990 study The Dastgah Concept in Persian Music.

== Life and career ==
Hormoz Farhat was born on 9 August 1928, in Tehran, the capital city of what was then Imperial State of Persia, but renamed in 1935 as Iran. His father Ebrahim Farat was a senior official at the Persian Ministry of Finance married to his mother Sedique. The Farhat family had descended from a long line of "secularised Muslims", many of whom were civil servicemen like Ebrahim. His cousin Shahin Farhat also became a composer. According to Farhat himself, his early exposure to Iranian music was limited to his father occasionally playing the tar. Instead, he recalls that his ""early musical outlook was mainly western", later filtered through the country's radio station that was established in 1939.

Farhat later moved to the United States and received a BA in music from the University of California, Los Angeles, UCLA (1953), an MA in composition from Mills College, California (1955), and a PhD in composition and ethnomusicology from UCLA (1965). He studied composition with Darius Milhaud, Lukas Foss, and Roy Harris.

In 1959, Farhat founded the Music of Persia Performance Group at UCLA. During his years in California Farhat worked first as an assistant professor of music at California State University, Long Beach (1961–64) and then as associate professor of music at University of California, Los Angeles (1964–69).

On returning to Iran he became a professor and head of the music department at the University of Tehran, (1970–78) as well as the head of the Music Council in the National Iranian Radio and Television Network (1969–78) and Shiraz Arts Festival. He was vice-chancellor at Farabi University in Tehran (1975–77). In 1972 and 1973, he was invited as a visiting professor of music to Harvard University.

Farhat moved to Northern Ireland in 1979 as a senior research fellow at Queen's University, Belfast and then to the Republic of Ireland as the chair, professor and head of the School of Music in Trinity College Dublin (1982–95). Among his students at Trinity College was Donnacha Dennehy, who became among the leading Irish composers of contemporary classical music. He was a guest lecturer at numerous institutions including universities of Michigan, Illinois, Indiana, Princeton, Stanford, Berkeley, Glasgow, Edinburgh, Durham, Amsterdam, Cologne, Warsaw, Ljubljana, Copenhagen, Stockholm and The Smithsonian Institution in Washington D.C. He was the external examiner at the University of Durham School of Music (1991–1994) and the Royal Irish Academy of Music (2001–2004 and 2011–2014).

Farhat died in Dublin, Ireland, aged 93. In December 2021 the University College Cork and the University of Tehran jointly organised a virtual memorial for Prof. Farhat.

== Music ==
=== Overview ===
His compositions have been performed widely by, among many others, the BBC Symphony Orchestra and English Chamber Orchestra and most recently by the pianist Soheil Nasseri in Carnegie Hall and Merkin Hall in New York as well as in the Strathmore Music Center.

=== Selected recordings ===
- String Quartets, Nos. 1, 2 & 3: St Petersburg String Quartet & Arvand String Quartet (Ravi-Azar-Kimia Institute, 2007).
- Persian Autumn (piano work): Mary Dullea, piano (Divine Arts, 2020).

== Selected compositions ==
Orchestral works

- Sinfonia Concertante, for seven solo instruments, soprano and orchestra
- Mazandarani Rhapsody, for orchestra
- Theme and Variations
- Sinfonietta
- Three Songs of Sa'di, for soprano and orchestra
- Fantasy and Fugue, for string orchestra
- Concerto Grosso, for piano and string orchestra
- Flute Concerto
- Clarinet Concerto
- Sougue, elegy for orchestra
- Nouveau rivage and La Nuit éternelle, two orchestral pieces after the poem "Le Lac" of Alphonse de Lamartine.

Chamber music

- 6 string quartets
- 3 wind trios
- Duo for Violin and Viola
- Divertimento for Saxophone Quartet (published, Chicago: Leblanc Music Publishers, 1966)
- Piano Quintet
- Partita for Wind Quintet

Piano music

- Theme and Variations
- Persian Suite (4 pieces)
- 2 Sonatas
- Four Suites
- Four Concert Études
- 24 Essays
- Five Bagatelles

Vocal music

- Two Songs on Poems by Sa'di, for soprano, violin and harp (1957)
- Be Yad-e Neyshapur [In Memory of Neyshapur]; a "chain" of seven songs on Rubaiyat of Omar Khayyam (1959)
- Three Persian Songs, for soprano, flute, cello and piano (1962)
- several pieces for a cappella choir

Motion picture scores Scores for feature films by prominent Iranian film directors Dariush Mehrjui: Gaav (The Cow, 1969), Postchi (Postman), and Aagha-ye Haaloo (Mr. Naive, 1970); and Nasser Taghvai: Aaraamesh dar hozoor-e digaraan (Tranquility in the Presence of Others, 1972); and Saadegh Kordeh (Sadeq the Kurdish, 1973). In 1970, Farhat was awarded The Golden Plaque for Best Music for the score of Mehrjui's internationally acclaimed film Gaav.

== Selected publications ==
Books:

- The Traditional Art Music of Iran (Tehran: Ministry of Culture and Arts Press, 1973).
- Farhat, Hormoz (2004) [1990]. The Dastgah Concept in Persian Music. Cambridge: Cambridge University Press. ISBN 978-0-521-54206-7.
- Present Past: Notes from the Life of a Persian/American Composer in Ireland. Ibex Publishers, Bethesda, 2018.
- Rhapsody Mazandarani for Orchestra (Amsterdam: Persian Dutch Network, 2020).

Persian Translations:

- Counterpoint by Kent Kennan (Tehran: University of Tehran Press, 1974).
- Dastgah dar Musiqi-ye Irani (a Persian translation by Mehdi Pur-Mohammad of "The Dastgah Concept in Persian Music") (Tehran: Part Press, 2002).

Articles

- "Old and New Values in Changing Cultural Patterns", in Iran: Past, Present and Future (Aspen Institute, 1976).
- 64 articles in the Persian encyclopaedia Daerattomaaref (Tehran: -e Farsi, 1976).
- The article on Iran in the New Grove Dictionary of Music and Musicians (London: MacMillan, 1980).
- "Scales and Intervals: Theory and Practice", in Irish Musical Studies, ed. Gerard Gillen and Harry White (Blackrock County Dublin: Irish Academic Press, 1990).
- Ten articles in Encyclopaedia Iranica, ed. E. Yarshater.
- "Western Influences on Persian Music", in Muzikolski Zbornik (Musicological Annual) XVII (Ljubljana, 1991).
- "The Evolution of Style and Content in Performance Practices of Persian Traditional Music", in: Muzikoloski Zbornik (Musicological Annual) XXXIII (Ljubljana, 1997).
- Farhat, Hormoz (1 January 1998). "Music". Iranian Studies. 31 (3/4): 561–570. doi:10.1080/00210869808701932. JSTOR 4311189.
- 7 articles in the second edition of the New Grove Dictionary of Music and Musicians (London: MacMillan, 2001).
- Lawergren, Bo; Farhat, Hormoz; Blum, Stephen (2001). "Iran". Grove Music Online. Oxford: Oxford University Press. doi:10.1093/gmo/9781561592630.article.13895. ISBN 978-1-56159-263-0. (subscription, Wikilibrary access, or UK public library membership required)
- Farhat, Hormoz (2012). "An Introduction to Persian Music" (PDF). Catalogue of the Festival of Oriental Music. Durham: University of Durham.
