= Jean During =

French ethnomusicologist

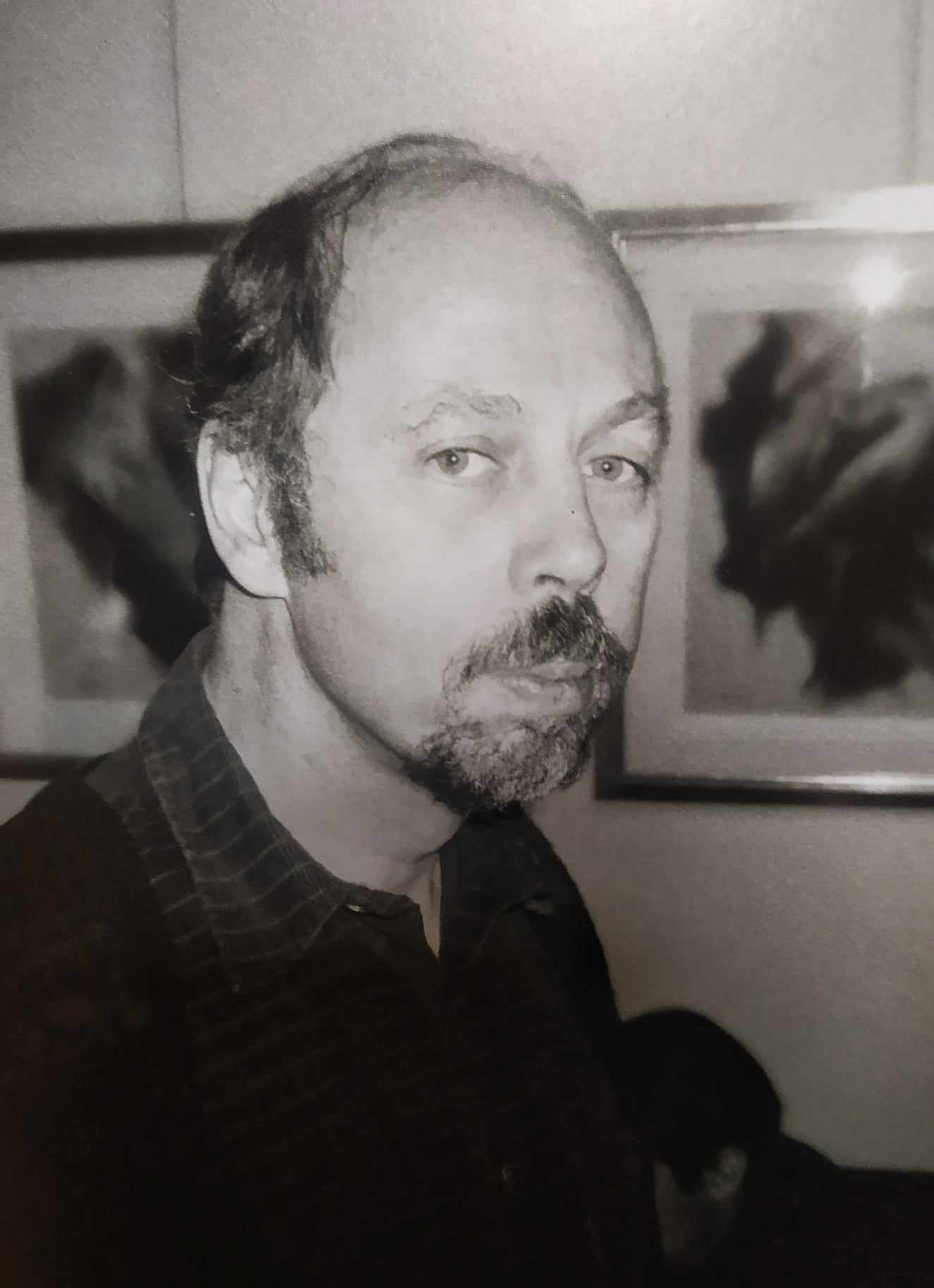
Jean During

Jean During (born 1947) is a French musician and ethnomusicologist specialising in music from the nations of the East especially Iran, Central Asia, Afghanistan and Azerbaijan. A commentator on the Middle Eastern and South Asian cultures, he is the Research Director at the French National Center for Scientific Research and a professor at the University of Strasbourg.

== Biography ==
Jean During was born in 1947 in France. He began studying guitar at the age of 13, and by the age of 17, he was teaching Western classical guitar at the Toulouse National Conservatory and performing solo and with chamber orchestras. He left France after receiving a master's degree in philosophy to study Iranian music and eventually settled in Iran. He earned his PhD in 1975 on the history of Iranian music and taught for four years at the Iranian Institute of Philosophy. He returned to France after the Iranian Revolution and enrolled in the French Center for Scientific Research.

== Works ==
=== Albums ===
- Daramad-E Dovvom (Metric Pieces By Jean During) (2013)
- The Uighur Qumul Muqam of Xinjiang, China (2014)

=== Books ===
In English

- The Spirit of Sounds: The Unique Art of Ostad Elahi (1895–1974) (2003)
- Resonance: The Musical Legacy of Ostad Elahi (2016)
- The art of Persian music (Washington, D.C. : Mage Publishers, 1991)

In French

- La musique traditionnelle de l'Azerbayjan et la science des muqâms [Traditional Music of Azerbaijan and the Science of Muqâms] (Baden-Baden : Bouxwiller : V. Koerner, 1988)
- La musique iranienne : tradition et évolution [Iranian Music: Tradition and Evolution] (Paris : Editions Recherche sur les civilisations, 1984)
- Musique et extase : l'audition mystique dans la tradition soufie [Music and Ecstasy: Mystic Audition in the Sufi Tradition] (Paris : A. Michel, ©1988)
- Musiques d'Asie centrale : l'esprit d'une tradition [Musics of Central Asia: the spirit of a tradition] (Arles: City of Music: Actes sud, 1998.)
- Musique et mystique dans les traditions de l'Iran [Music and Mysticism in the Traditions of Iran] (Paris : Institut français de recherche en Iran, 1989)
- Quelque chose se passe: le sens de la tradition dans l'Orient musical [Something happens: the meaning of tradition in the musical Orient] (Lagrasse : Verdier, 1995)
- Azerbâyjân: musique traditionelle [Azerbaijan: traditional music] (Chant du monde : Distribution, Harmonia Mundi France, 1989)
