= Faraz Khosravi Danesh =

Faraz Khosravi Danesh فراز خسروی دانش
- Born: 10 November 1988 (age 36); Esfahan, Iran
- Genres: A cappella
- Occupations: Composer, conductor, musician
- Instruments: Piano
- Website: https://farazkhosravidanesh.com/

Faraz Khosravi Danesh (Persian: فراز خسروی دانش) is an Iranian composer. He co-founded the Damour Vocal Band with Ata Hakkak. While composing and singing for his own band, he also composed for the band "Sokoot 7" and the soundtrack for the animation: "Shippers".

Damour Vocal Band was a successful experience for its members, especially for Khosravi Danesh who was the leader and composer of the band. The a cappella band effectively introduced the genre to the Iranian audience, performing on national TV and winning different awards. What makes the band stand out is that it provided a legal framework for women to sing, in a country where singing for women is prohibited.

Khosravi Danesh used the publicity from the Damour Vocal Band experience to launch a career in teaching music, create his own record company, and gain recognition as a composer.
