= Stephen Blum =

American scholar and musician (born 1942)

- Born: March 4, 1942 (age 84); East Cleveland, Ohio, U.S.
- Education: BMus, PhD
- Alma mater: University of Illinois
- Occupations: Ethnomusicologist, musician
- Employer: CUNY Graduate Center
- Known for: Music of West and Central Asia; ethnomusicological analysis

Stephen Blum (born March 4, 1942) is an American scholar and musician, whose research has primarily been in ethnomusicology. He has lent a multidisciplinary approach to the writing and publication of numerous articles discussing a wide range of musical topics and ideas.

Blum's writing displays a strong knowledge of parallel disciplines through the thoughtful inclusion of academic theory from the fields of sociology, historical musicology, philosophy, anthropology, composition and analysis. Through his continued participation and critiques, he has made numerous contributions to the dialogue surrounding the fields of ethnomusicology and musicology.

== Biography ==
Blum received a bachelor's degree from Oberlin College in 1964, and then a PhD in music at the University of Illinois at Urbana–Champaign. As a PhD student, Blum worked with music scholars including Alexander Ringer, Charles Hamm, and Bruno Nettl. His first publications were co-authored with Nettl, a pioneering historical musicologist and ethnomusicologist, and supervising his dissertation, Musics in Contact: The Cultivation of Oral Repertoires in Meshed Iran, University of Illinois at Urbana–Champaign, 1972.

Blum was to later co-edit the 1991 festschrift for Nettl, Ethnomusicology and Modern Music History, along with former Nettl students Philip Bohlman and Daniel M. Neuman.

== Academic appointments ==
Blum's teaching career began at Western Illinois University (1967–73), followed by an assistant professorship at University of Illinois at Urbana–Champaign until 1977. He then moved to Toronto's York University, where he remained for ten years, founding the MFA program "Music and Contemporary Cultures", the first of its kind Canada. In 1987 he founded the ethnomusicology program at Graduate Center of the City University of New York, where he worked until his retirement in 2016.

== Scholarship and legacy ==
Blum's ethnographic focus on northeastern Iran in his PhD dissertation led to a number of published articles early in his career discussing the folksinging traditions of these regions. His final observations were not just theoretical, but took into consideration the racial and classist attitudes among his informants, the implications of which are included in his ethnographic work. In "The Concept of the ‘Asheq in Northern Khorasan" (1972) Blum presents part of his fieldwork undertaken in 1969 for his dissertation but pointedly focuses on social folk music of the (primarily) Kurdish minority. In 1974, his article, "Persian Folksong in Meshhed (Iran)", Blum continued a detailed rhythmic and melodic analysis of ten folk songs while focusing on informant-perceived rural and urban difference in style and performance. He observed that a lack of singing and dancing in Iranian society is not linked to a rural and urban divide but is a privation of poverty. He noted,

[T]he high degree of differentiations in Iranian society not only ensures the member of one group (defined by place of residence, occupation, ethnic identity, or whatever combination of diverse attributes) will often lack, or at least deny, first-hand knowledge of activities within other groups.

With Ameneh Youssefzadeh, Blum is the consulting editor in music for Encyclopædia Iranica. He is also the author of a number of entries in The New Grove Dictionary of Music and Musicians and has contributed to the three volumes of the Garland Encyclopedia of World Music devoted to the United States and Canada, the Middle East, and Europe.

Blum often returned to his Western roots, a prominent example being an article on the writing and music of Charles Ives published in 1977 in The Musical Quarterly. He discusses and analyzes Ives' music through his writing, tackling the motivations and perceptions of a stubborn and controversial artist, concluding that Ives’ "musical techniques aimed to explore 'processes of musical differentiation' in relationships of sounds, with reference to their social and moral contexts." He has often tackled theoretical issues in musicology, ethnomusicology.

The field recordings from his research trips to Iran were donated to Harvard University, where they have been digitized and posted publicly online as the Stephen Blum Collection of Music from Iranian Khorāsān. In 1995, Blum donated copies of this collection to Iran's Ministry of Islamic Culture and Guidance.

== Publications ==
- "Meter and Rhythm in the Sung Poetry of Iranian Khorasan," in Thought and Play in Musical Rhythm, ed. Richard Wolf, Stephen Blum, and Christopher Hasty, Oxford, 2020, pages 75–99.
- "The Terminology of Vocal Performance in Iranian Khorasan," in Theory and Practice in the Music of the Islamic World: Essays in Honour of Owen Wright, Ashgate, Aldershot, 2017.
- "Ethnomusicologists and Questions of Temporality," in Music in Time: Phenomenology, Perception, Performance, ed. Suzanna Clark and Alexander Rehding. Cambridge: Harvard University Department of Music, 2016, pages 55–67.
- “Foundations of Musical Knowledge in the Muslim World,” in The Cambridge History of World Music, ed. Philip V. Bohlman. Cambridge: Cambridge University Press, 2013, pages 103–24.
- “Classical Aesthetic Traditions of India, China, and the Middle East” (with Peter Manuel), in The Routledge Companion to Philosophy and Music, ed. Theodore Gracyk and Andrew Kania, 2011, pages 245–56.
- “A Society and its Journal: Stories of Hybridity,” Asian Music XLII/1 (2011), pages 3–23.
- “Karnā,” Encyclopaedia Iranica, XV, fasc. 6 (2011), and on website, iranica.com.
- “Musical Enactment of Attitudes toward Conflict in the USA,” in Music and Conflict: Ethnomusicological Perspectives, ed. John Morgan O’Connell and Salwa El-Shawan Castelo-Branco. Urbana: University of Illinois Press, 2010, pages 232–42.
- “Kamānča,” Encyclopaedia Iranica, XV, fasc. 4 (2010), pages 434–37, and on website, iranica.com.
- “Modes of Theorizing in Iranian Khorasan,” in Theorizing the Local: Music, Practice, and Experience in South Asia and Beyond, ed. Richard K. Wolf. New York: Oxford University Press, 2009, pages 207–24.
- “Representations of Music Making,” in Musical Improvisation: Art, Education, and Society, ed. Gabriel Solis and Bruno Nettl. Urbana: University of Illinois Press, 2009, pages 239–62.
- “Remembering Warriors in Song,” in Musical Culture and Memory (Musicological Studies: Proceedings, no. 2), ed. Tatjana Marković and Vesna Mikić. Belgrade: Department of Musicology, Faculty of Music, University of Arts, 2008: pages 273–280.
- “Avāz,” Encyclopedia of Islam, third edition, Leiden: Brill, 2007/2: pages 182–83
- “‘Abd al-Qādir al-Marāghī,” Encyclopedia of Islam, third edition, 2007/3:21.
- “‘Abdallāh, Mīrzā” Encyclopedia of Islam, third edition, 2007/3: 23.
- “Navā’i, a Musical Genre of Northeastern Iran,” in Analytical Studies in World Music, ed. Michael Tenzer. New York: Oxford University Press, 2006, 41–57.
- “Compelling Reasons to Sing: the Music of Ta‘ziye,” TDR /the journal of performance studies, XLIX/4 [no. T188] ( 2005), 86–90. Reprinted in Eternal Performance: Ta‘ziyeh and Other Shiite Rituals, ed. Peter J. Chelkowski and Richard Schechner (Seagull Books, 2010), pages 170–77.
- “The Art of the Khorasani Baxşi,” Folklor ve Etnoqrafiya (Baku), 1 (2004), 11–16.
- “L’acte musicale: éléments d’analyse,” L’Homme, Revue Française d'Anthropologie, no. 171-172 (2004), pages 231–247.
- “Some Questions That Concern Ethnomusicologists,” Musiqi dunyasi (Baku), 2004/1-2.
- “Kurtág’s Articulation of Kafka's Rhythms (Kafka-Fragmenta, op. 24),” Studia Musicologica Academiae Scientiarum Hungaricae, XLIII/3-4 (2002), pages 121–34. French translation, “L’articulation des rythmes de Kafka selon Kurtág (Fragments de Kafka op. 24),” in Ligatures: La pensée musicale de György Kurtág, ed. Pierre Maréchaux and Grégoire Tosser (Rennes: Presses Universitaires de Rennes, 2009), pages 177–91.
- “Hearing the Music of the Middle East,” The Garland Encyclopedia of World Music, Volume VI, The Middle East, ed. Virginia Danielson, Scott Marcus, and Dwight Reynolds. New York: Garland, 2002, pages 3–13. Abridged in The Concise Garland Encyclopedia of World Music 2: pages 767–70.
- “Iran: an Introduction,” The Garland Encyclopedia of World Music, Volume VI, The Middle East, The Middle East, ed. Virginia Danielson, Scott Marcus, and Dwight Reynolds. New York: Garland, 2002, pages 823–838.
- Biographical articles on six Kurdish musicians (with Amir Hassanpour): “Kamkars,” “Kurdistani, Sayid Ali Asghar,” “Mamili, Mihammad,” “Miryam Khan,” “Perwer, Şivan,” and “Razzazi, Nasir.” The New Grove Dictionary of Music and Musicians, 2nd edition, ed. Stanley Sadie and John Tyrrell. London and New York: Macmillan, 2nd ed., 2001, Volumes XIII, page 343; XIV, pages 41–2; XV, page 718; XVI, page 752; XIX, page 477; XX, page 890.
- “Central Asia,” The New Grove Dictionary of Music and Musicians, 2nd edition, ed. Stanley Sadie and John Tyrrell. London and New York: Macmillan, 2001, Volume V, pages 363–72.
- “Composition,” The New Grove Dictionary of Music and Musicians, 2nd edition, ed. Stanley Sadie and John Tyrrell. London and New York: Macmillan, 2001, Volume VI, pages 186–201.
- “Iran, Folk Music,” The New Grove Dictionary of Music and Musicians, 2nd edition, ed. Stanley Sadie and John Tyrrell. London and New York: Macmillan, 2001, Volume IX, page 300–09.
- “Iran, III. Regional and Popular Traditions,” The New Grove Dictionary of Music and Musicians, 2nd edition, ed. Stanley Sadie and John Tyrrell. London and New York: Macmillan, 2001, Vol. XII, pages 537–46.
- “Kurdish Music” (with Dieter Christensen), The New Grove Dictionary of Music and Musicians, 2nd edition, ed. Stanley Sadie and John Tyrrell. London and New York: Macmillan, 2001, Volume XIV, pages 36–41.
- “Repertory”(with Ian Bent), The New Grove Dictionary of Music and Musicians, 2nd edition, ed. Stanley Sadie and John Tyrrell. London and New York: Macmillan, 2001, Volume XXI, pages 196–98.
- “Sources, Scholarship and Historiography,” The Garland Encyclopedia of World Music, Vol. III, The United States and Canada, ed. Ellen Koskoff. New York: Garland, 2001, pages 21–37.
- “Local Knowledge of Musical Genres and Roles,” The Garland Encyclopedia of World Music, Volume VIII, Europe, ed. James Porter and Timothy F. Rice. New York: Garland, 2000, pages 112–26.
- “Recognizing Improvisation,” in In the Course of Performance: Studies in the World of Musical Improvisation, ed. Bruno Nettl with Melinda Russell. Chicago: University of Chicago Press, 1998, pages 27–45.
- “Musical Questions and Answers in Iranian Xorāsān,” EM: Annuario degli Archivi di Etnomusicologia dell'Accademia Nazionale di Santa Cecilia, IV (1996), pages 145–63. Italian translation, “Domande e risposte musicali nel Xorāsān iranienne,” in Incontri di etnomusicologia: seminari e conferenza in ricordo di Diego Carpitella, ed. Giovanni Giuriati, Rome: Accademia Nazionale di Santa Cecilia, 2007, pages 215–34.
- “‘The Morning of Freedom Rose Up’: Kurdish Popular Song and the Exigencies of Cultural Survival” (with Amir Hassanpour), Popular Music, XV/3 (1996), pages 325–43. Reprinted in Non-Western Popular Music (The Library of Essays on Popular Music), ed. Tony Langlois (Farnham: Ashgate, 2012), pages 77–95. Turkish translation, “Kürt Halk Şarkısı ve Kültürel Kalıtımın Zorunlulukları,” in Kürt müziği, dansları ve şarıkları / Müzik, dans u şarqiyen kurd, ed. Mehmet Bayrak (Kızılay/Ankara: Özge, 2002), 1: pages 366–84.
- “Do-baytī,” in Encyclopædia Iranica, ed. Ehsan Yarshater, Volume VII, fasc. 5 (1995), pages 451–2.
- “Conclusion: Music in the Age of Cultural Confrontation.” in Music-Cultures in Contact: Convergences and Collisions, ed. Margaret J. Kartomi and Stephen Blum, Sydney: Currency Press (Australian Studies in the History, Philosophy, and Social Studies of Music, 2) and Basel: Gordon & Breach (Musicology: A Book Series, 16), 1994, pages 250–77.
- “In Defense of Close Reading and Close Listening.” Symposium on “Approaches to the Discipline,” Current Musicology, number 53 (1993), pages 41–54.
- “Analysis of Musical Style,” in Ethnomusicology: An Introduction, ed. Helen Myers. New York: Norton and London: Macmillan, 1992 (Norton/Grove Handbooks in Music),165–218. Korean translation by Bag Mi-gyeong, Eum’ag gwa munhwa / Music and Culture 16 (2007), pages 183–228.
- “European Musical Terminology and the Music of Africa,” in Comparative Musicology and Anthropology of Music: Essays in the History of Ethnomusicology, ed. Bruno Nettl and Philip V. Bohlman. Chicago: The University of Chicago Press, 1991, pages 1–36.
- “Prologue: Ethnomusicologists and Modern Music History.” in Ethnomusicology and Modern Music History, ed. Stephen Blum, Philip V. Bohlman, and Daniel M. Neuman. Urbana: University of Illinois Press, 1991, pages 1–20. Chinese translation, People's Music Publishing House, 2009.
- Commentary for Symposium, “The Representation of Musical Practice and the Practice of Representation,” Ethnomusicology, XXXIV (1990), pages 413–21.
- “Music History,” in International Encyclopedia of Communications, ed. Erik Barnouw. New York: Oxford University Press, 1989, Volume III, pages 104–11.
- “On the Disciplines and Arts of Music,” The World of Music, XXIX/1 (1987), pages 19–32.
- "The Fuging Tune in British North America," in Sing Out the Glad News: Hymn Tunes in Canada. Proceedings of the Conference held in Toronto February 7 and 8, 1986, ed. John Beckwith. Toronto: Institute for Canadian Music, 1987: pages 119–48.
- “Ethnomusicologists vis-à-vis the Fallacies of Contemporary Musical Life,” Pacific Review of Ethnomusicology, III (1986), 1–19 (responses by 11 scholars, pages 20–41).
- “Rousseau’s Concept of Sistême musical and the Comparative Study of Tonalities in Nineteenth-Century France,” Journal of the American Musicological Society, XXXVIII (1985), pages 349–61.
- “Changing Roles of Performers in Meshhed and Bojnurd, Iran,” in Eight Urban Musical Cultures, ed. Bruno Nettl. Urbana: University of Illinois Press, 1978, pages 19–95.
- “An Ethnomusicologist’s Reflections on ‘Complexity’ and ‘Participation’ in Music,” College Music Symposium, XVII/2 (1977), pages 25–41.
- “Ives’s Position in Social and Musical History,” The Musical Quarterly, LXIII (1977), pages 459–82.
- “Towards a Social History of Musicological Technique,” Ethnomusicology, XIX (1975), pages 207–31.
- “Persian Folksong in Meshhed (Iran), 1969,” Yearbook of the International Folk Music Council, VI (1974), 86–114. Persian translation, “Tarāne-ye mardomi dar Mašhad, 1969,” Mahoor Music Quarterly X/39 (2008), pages 7–38.
- “The Concept of the 'Asheq in Northern Khorasan,” Asian Music IV/1 (1972), pages 27–47. Turkish translation, “Kuzey Horasan’da ‘Ašık’ kavramı” in Kürt müziği, dansları ve şarıkları / Mûzik, dans û şarqîyên kurdî, ed. Mehmet Bayrak (Kızılay/Ankara: Özge, 2002), 1: pages 515–32. Persian version, with corrections, “Mahfum-e ‘āšeq dar farhang-e musiq’i-ye šomāl-e Xorāsān,” Mahoor Music Quarterly, IV/17 (2002), pages 9–29.

== See also ==
- Persian traditional music
- Iranian folk music
