= Bo Lawergren =

Music archaeologist and physicist

Bo Lawergren is a music archaeologist and physicist. A Professor Emeritus of physics at Hunter College, he received his PhD in nuclear physics from the Australian National University of Canberra, Australia.

== Publications ==
- Lawergren, Bo (2003). "Oxus Trumpets, CA, 2200-1800 BCE: Material, Overview, Usage, Societal Role, and Catalog". Iranica Antiqua. 38: 41–118. doi:10.2143/IA.38.0.136.
- Lawergren, Bo (Feb 1998). "Distinctions among Canaanite, Philistine, and Israelite Lyres, and their Global Lyrical Contexts". Bulletin of the American Schools of Oriental Research (309): 41–68. doi:10.2307/1357602. JSTOR 1357602. S2CID 163212339.
- Lawergren, Bo; Gurney, O.R. (1987). "Sound Holes and Geometrical Figures. Clues to the Terminology of Ancient Mesopotamian Harps". Iraq. 49: 37–52. doi:10.2307/4200263. JSTOR 4200263.
- Lawergren, Bo (1994). "Buddha as a Musician: An Illustration of a Jataka Story". Artibus Asiae. 54 (3/4): 226–240. doi:10.2307/3250057. JSTOR 3250057.
- Lawergren, Bo (2019). "Music". In Dien, Albert E.; Knapp, Keith N. (eds.). The Cambridge History of China: Volume II: Six Dynasties, 220–589. Cambridge: Cambridge University Press. pp. 698–720. ISBN 978-1-107-02077-1.
