= List of Iranian composers =

This is a list of Iranian composers. See also full list of Iranian musicians and singers.

== Classical/Traditional Persian composers ==
- Abolhasan Saba
- Ali-Naqi Vaziri
- Ali Tajvidi
- Ardavan Kamkar
- Ardeshir Kamkar
- Faramarz Payvar
- Hamid Motebassem
- Homayoun Khorram
- Hossein Alizadeh
- Hossein Dehlavi
- Jalal Zolfonoun
- Mahmoud Zoufonoun
- Mohammad-Reza Darvishi
- Mohammad Reza Lotfi
- Mohammad Reza Shajarian
- Mahyar Alizadeh
- Mojtaba Mirzadeh
- Mehdi Rajabian
- Nima Aziminejad
- Parviz Meshkatian
- Saeed Farajpouri
- Shahin Shahbazi

== Contemporary Persian composers ==
- Ali Radman
- Arshia Samsaminia
- Arya Aziminejad
- Ahmad Pejman
- Ali Rahbari
- Ali Ahmadifar
- Alireza Mashayekhi
- Ardavan Kamkar
- Behzad Abdi
- Behzad Mirkhani
- Behzad Ranjbaran
- Faramarz Payvar
- Fariborz Lachini
- Fouzieh Majd
- Golnoush Khaleghi
- Heshmat Sanjari
- Hooshyar Khayam
- Hormoz Farhat
- Hossein Alizâdeh
- Houshang Ostovar
- Idin Samimi Mofakham
- Majid Entezami
- Mohammad-Reza Darvishi
- Mohammad Reza Tafazzoli
- Mehdi Hosseini
- Mehdi Rajabian
- Mohammad Shams
- Morteza Hannaneh
- Nader Mashayekhi
- Negar Bouban
- Negin Zomorodi
- Niloufar Nourbakhsh
- Reza Najfar
- Reza Vali
- Sahba Aminikia
- Saman Samadi
- Shahab Paranj
- Shahin Farhat
- Varoujan Hakhbandian

== Western Classical ==
- Ali Radman
- Ali Rahbari
- Aminollah Hossein
- Anoushiravan Rohani
- Arshia Samsaminia
- Ali Shahbazi
- Behzad Ranjbaran
- Fouzieh Majd
- Hangi Tavakoli
- Heshmat Sanjari
- Hooshyar Khayam
- Hormoz Farhat
- Houman Khalaj (born 1980)
- Houshang Ostovar
- Idin Samimi Mofakham
- Loris Tjeknavorian
- Mehran Rouhani
- Nader Mashayekhi
- Negar Bouban
- Negin Zomorodi
- Niloufar Nourbakhsh
- Mahdyar Aghajani
- Mehdi Hosseini
- Reza Najfar
- Shahrdad Rohani
- Saman Samadi
- Samin Baghcheban
- Shahin Farhat
- Tara Kamangar

== Musical theatre ==
- Mehdi Rajabian
- Ramin Karimloo
