= Zomorodi =

Zomorodi or Zomorrodi (Persian: زمردی) is an Iranian surname. Notable people with the surname include:

- Manoush Zomorodi, American journalist, podcast host, and author
- Negin Zomorodi (born 1973), Iranian composer and pianist
