= Aslani =

Aslani (Persian: اصلانی) is an Iranian surname. Notable people with the surname include:

- Faramarz Aslani (1945–2024), Iranian singer, guitarist, composer, songwriter, and music producer
- Farhad Aslani (born 1966), Iranian actor
- Farid Aslani (born 1988), Iranian basketball player
- Hossein Aslani (1936–2020), Iranian-American composer
- Mohammad Reza Aslani (born 1943), Iranian filmmaker, art theorist, graphic designer, and poet
