= Arshia =

Arshia (Persian: عرشیا, also rarely spells in Persian as ارشیا) is a unisex male given name of Persian/Iranian origin. Notable people with the name include:

== Given name ==
- Arshia Babazadeh (born 1995), Iranian footballer
- Arshia Behnezhad (born 2003), Iranian volleyball player
- Arshia Samsaminia (born 1989), Iranian composer
- Arshia Sattar (born 1960), Indian translator and writer
- Arshia Shakiba, Canadian documentary filmmaker, cinematographer, and editor
