= Hossein Aslani =

Iranian-American composer

Hossein Aslani (Persian: حسین اصلانی), also known as Gregory H. Aslani (1936 – January 28, 2020), was an Iranian American composer.

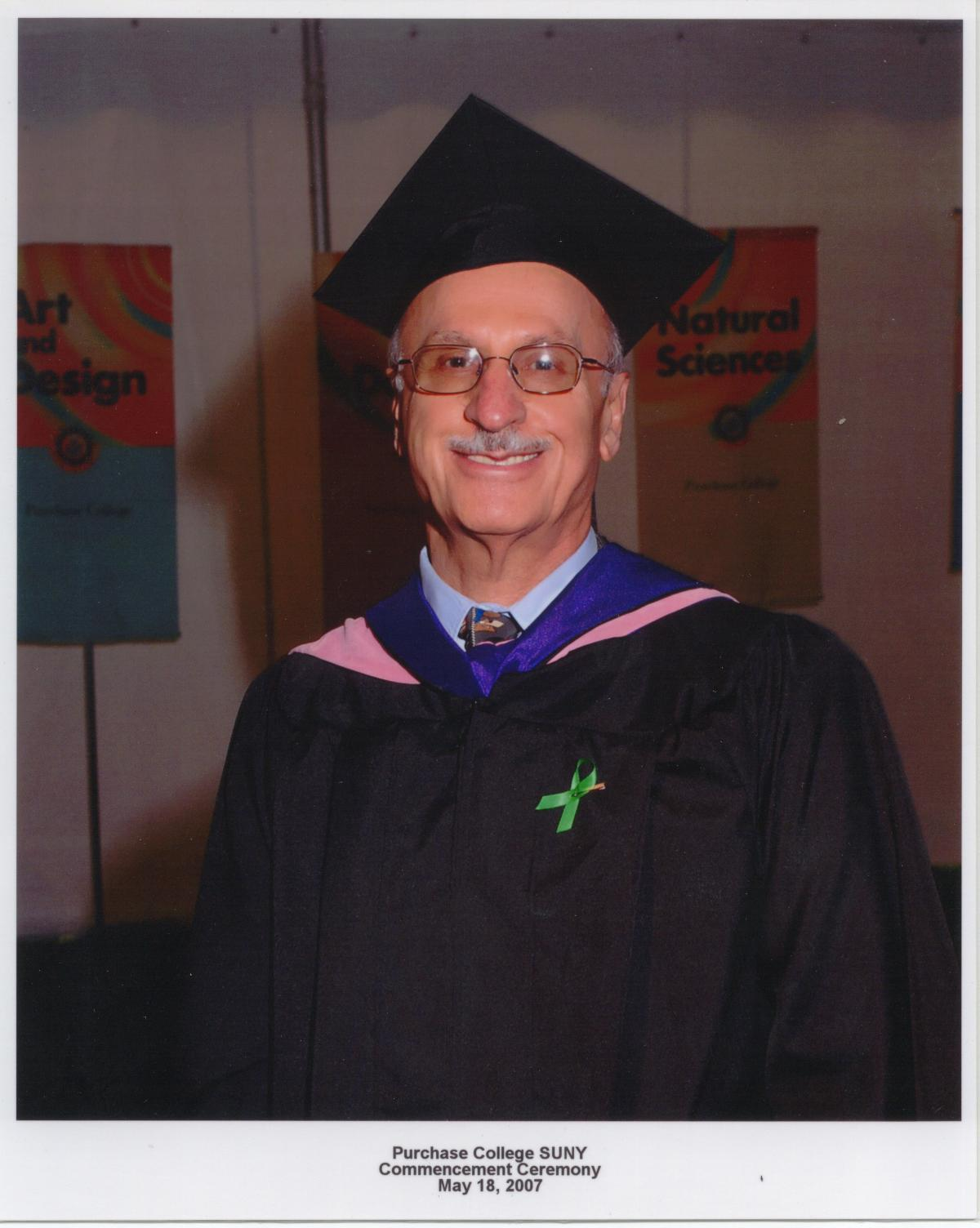
Hossein Aslani in May 2007

== Biography ==
He was born in the Rasht village of Shahghaji of Gilan, Iran in 1936 and died on January 28, 2020, in Rockland County of New York, United States. While completing high school and working, he mastered the accordion.

He enrolled the international conservatory of music in Tehran in Vahdat Hall in 1958 and studied under Houshang Ostovar.

Hossein Aslani was also invited to join the national radio Iran as a composer, arranger and pianist in 1965. His work for the radio employed wind instrument ensembles, electric guitar, and percussion.

Aslani's first written composition was a piece for piano and orchestra, conducted by Feredun Shahbazian, and performed by the Grand National Radio Orchestra in 1971.

A commitment to contemporary music brought Aslani to complete his master's degree in music composition at the State University of New York Conservatory of Music. He maintained a lifelong professional cooperation with his university mentors Dary John Mizelle, Joel Thome, and Steven Lubin.

His work has remained most inspired by the folkloric music of Gilan and other regions of his motherland Iran, combined with nostalgic melancholy of his early years as well as his extensive research of the works of contemporary composers Charles Ives, Aaron Copland, Igor Stravinsky, John Cage, Bella Bartok, Leonard Bernstein and Houshang Ostovar.

Hossein Aslani was the primary subject of the twenty-sixth session of the Pelke Tehran on August 26, 2015. Dr. Mohammad Sarir, Nader Mashayekhi, Mehran Purmandan, Bijan Zelli, Ali Ahmadifar and Soroush Riyazi participated in the discussion.

== Works ==
- A piece for brass
- A piece for Piano and Orchestra, 1970
- A piece for Piano and Orchestra, 2004
- Beyond Solitude for piano & flute, 2010
- Bridge, 2010
- Chahragah for piano
- Hope & Hopelessness for solo piano, 2005
- Persian Bridge Synthetic-Electronic, 2003
- Blind Alleys, 2010
- A piece for brass, 2010
- Solo for flute
- String Quartet
- Symbolic Emotion
- The Moments of Solitudes, 1971
- The Waiting Prairie, 1970
- The Moonlight in the Orchard, 1971
- A Shadow at Midnight, 1971
- Her Image, 1970
- The Wandering Wave, 1970
- The Waiting Prairie, 1970
- The Gipsy Hoopla, 1971
- In the Memory
- Apprension, 1971
- The Hallucinating Contemplation at Night, 1970
- The Moonlight Lake Tale, 1970
- Without Thou, 1970
- The Saharan Wild Flowers
- The Lover's Companion, 1971
- Life (2006, for purchase College)

== Gallery ==
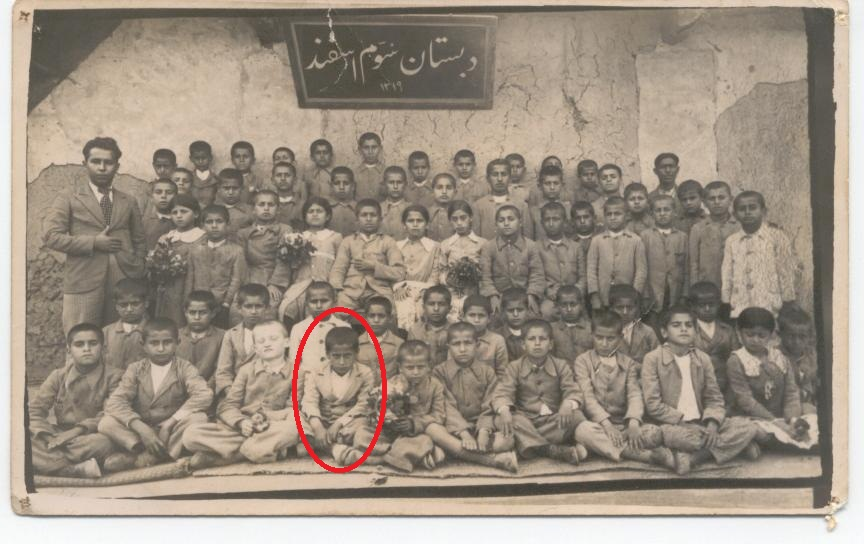
1942, at primary school

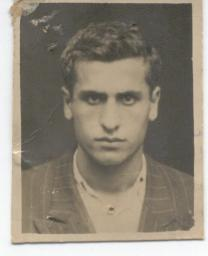

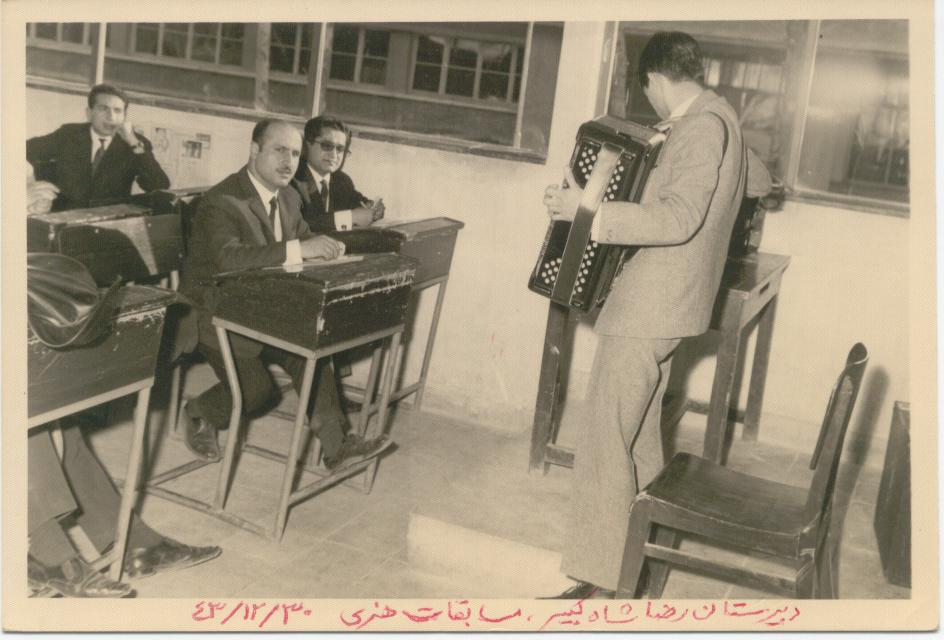

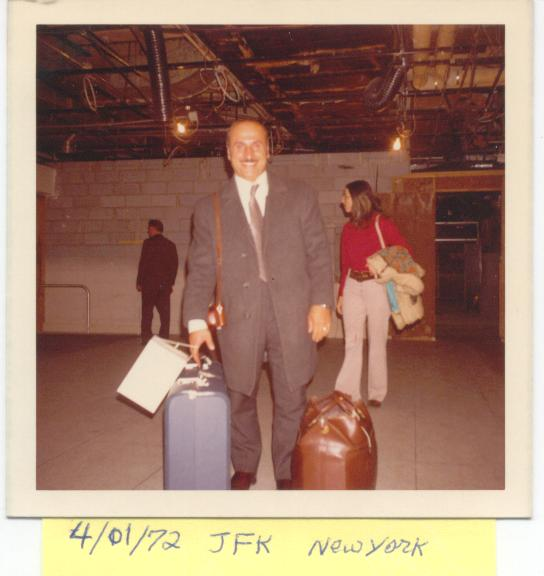
at JFK Airport, March 1993

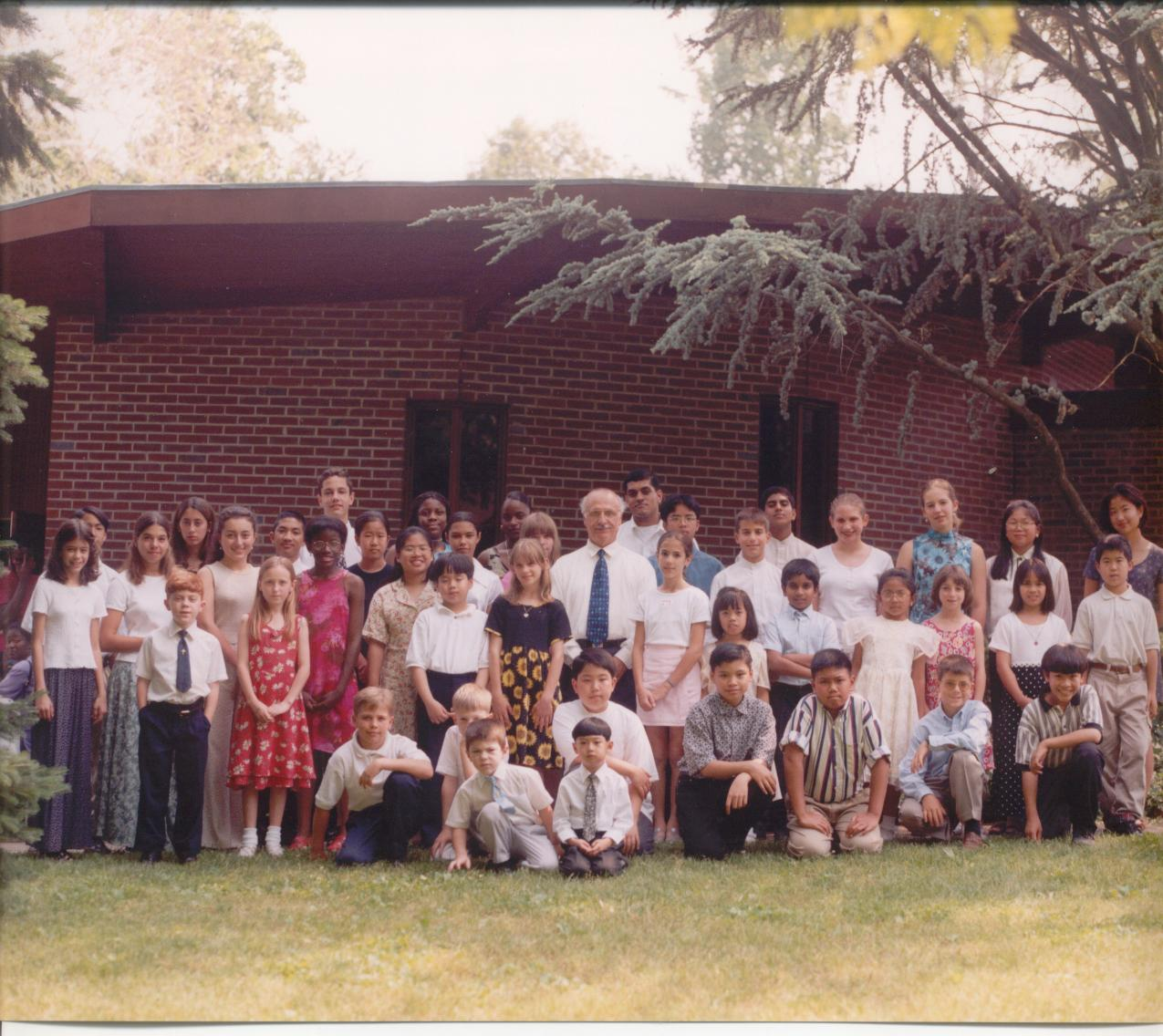

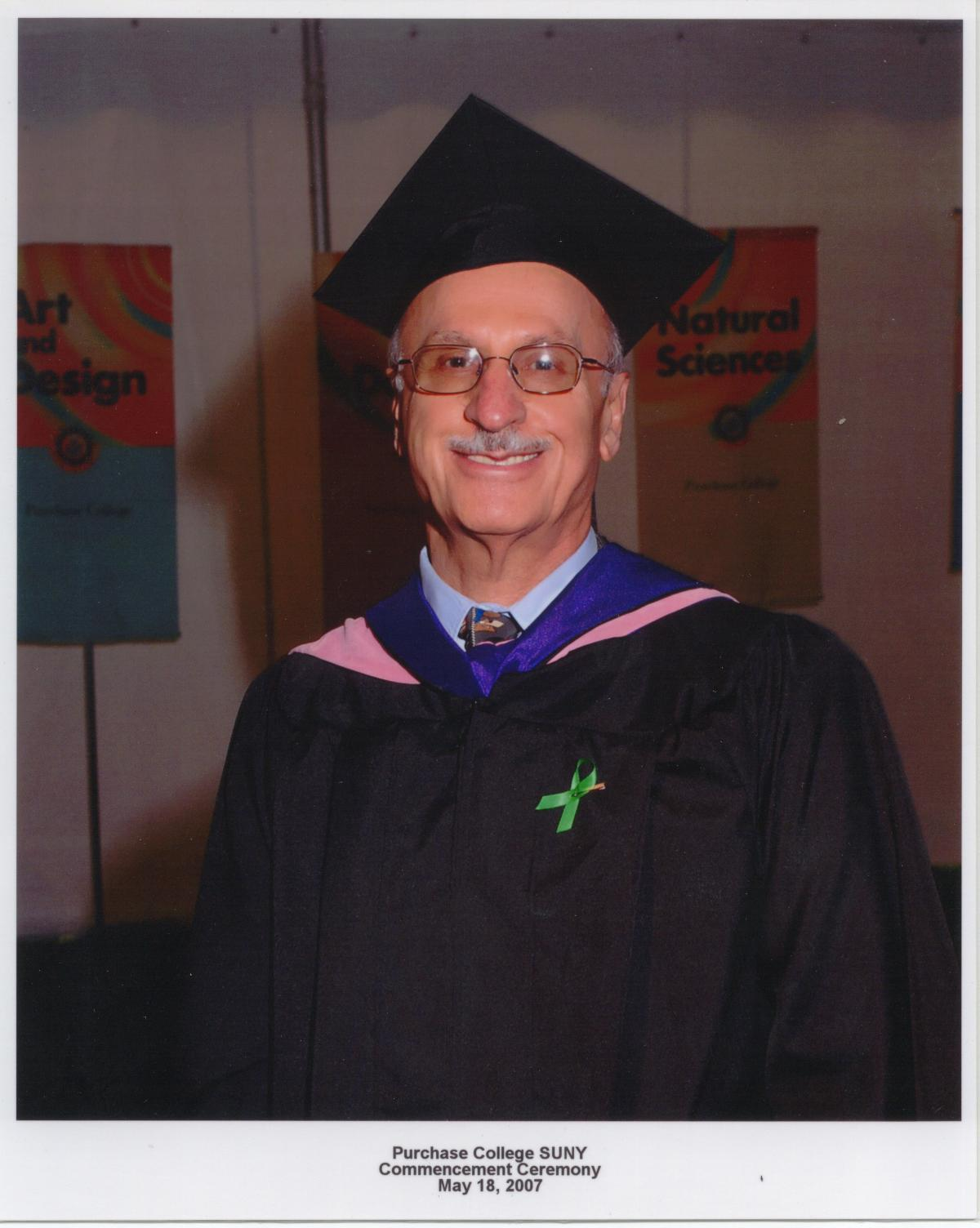
in May 2007

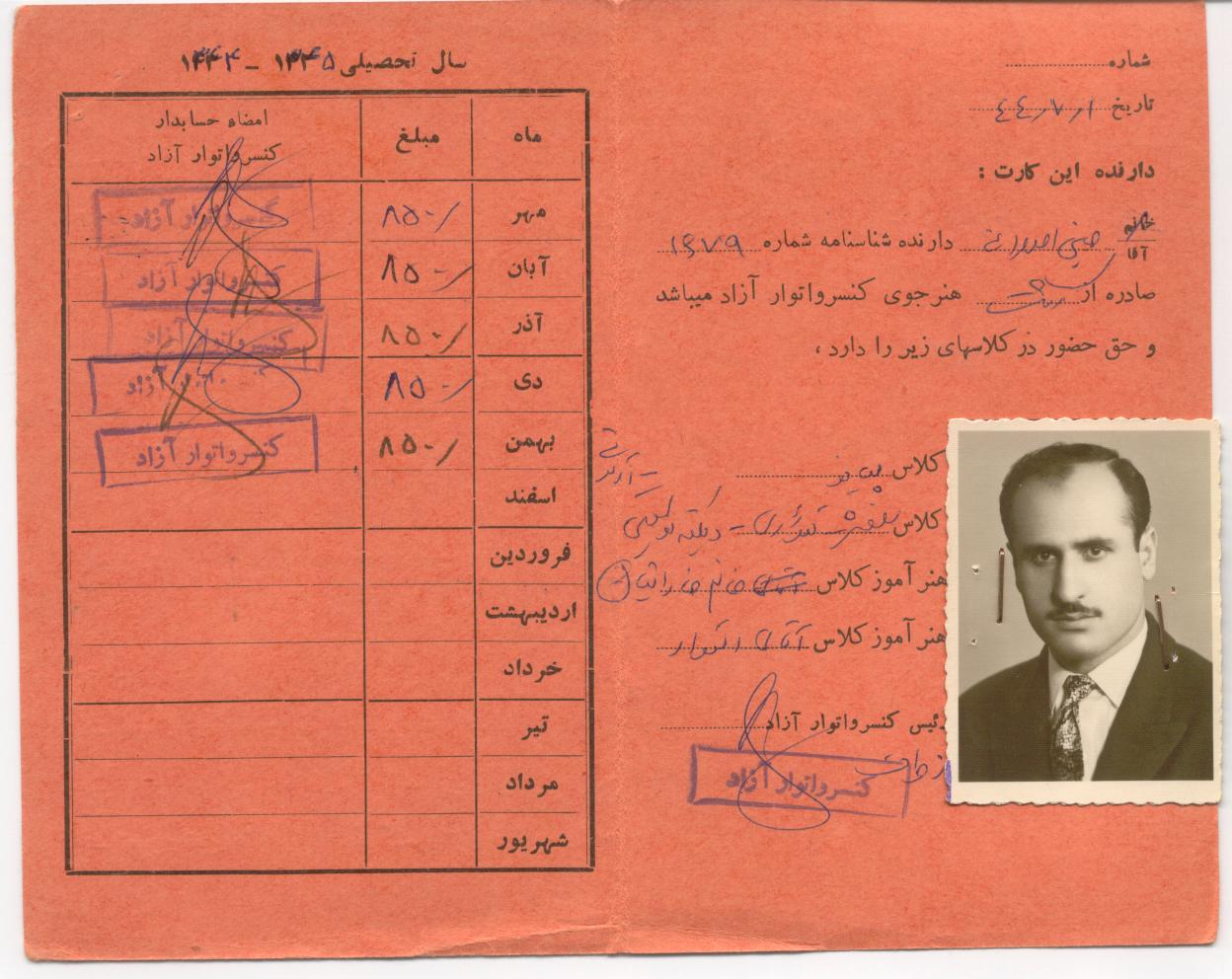

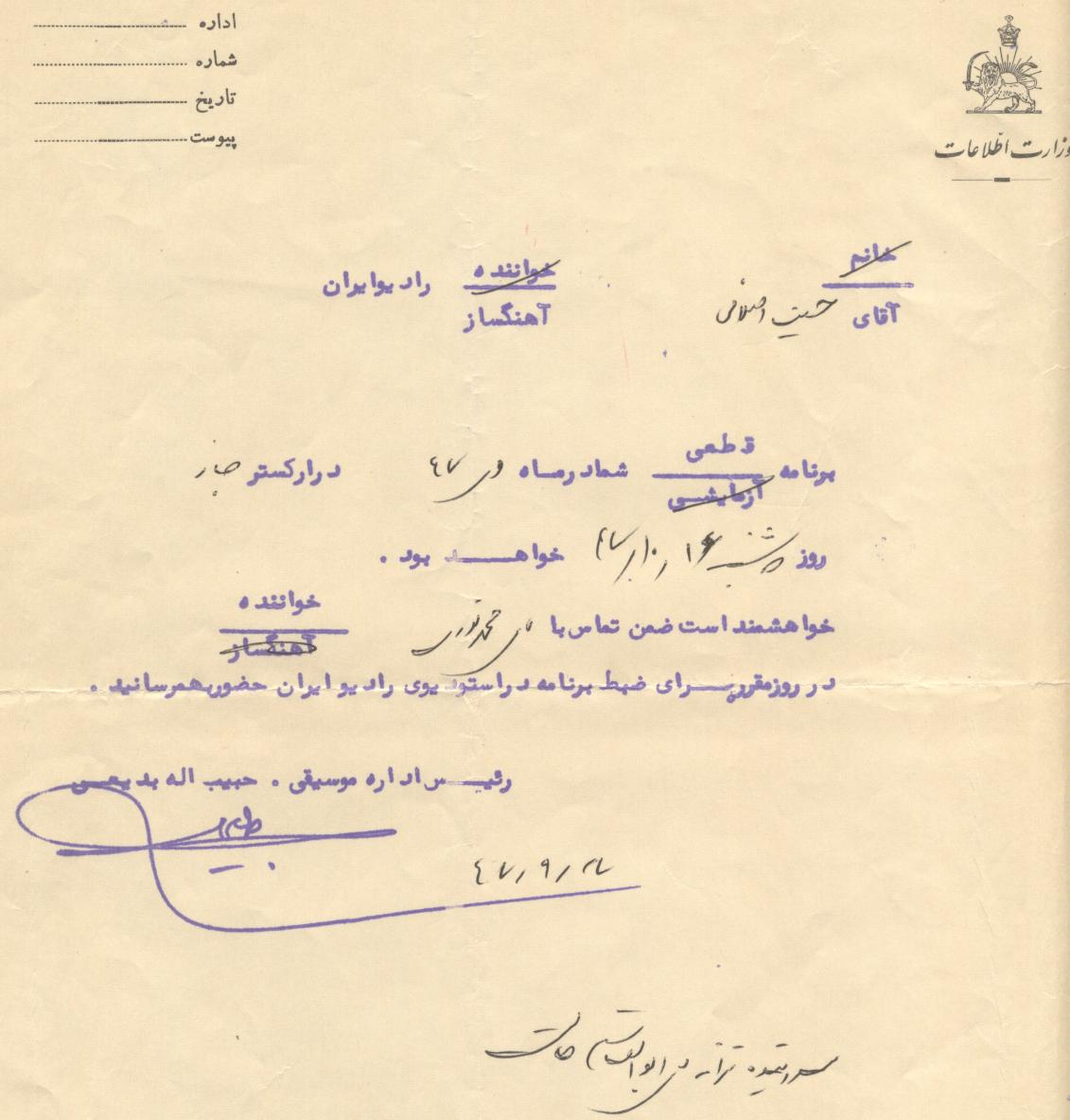

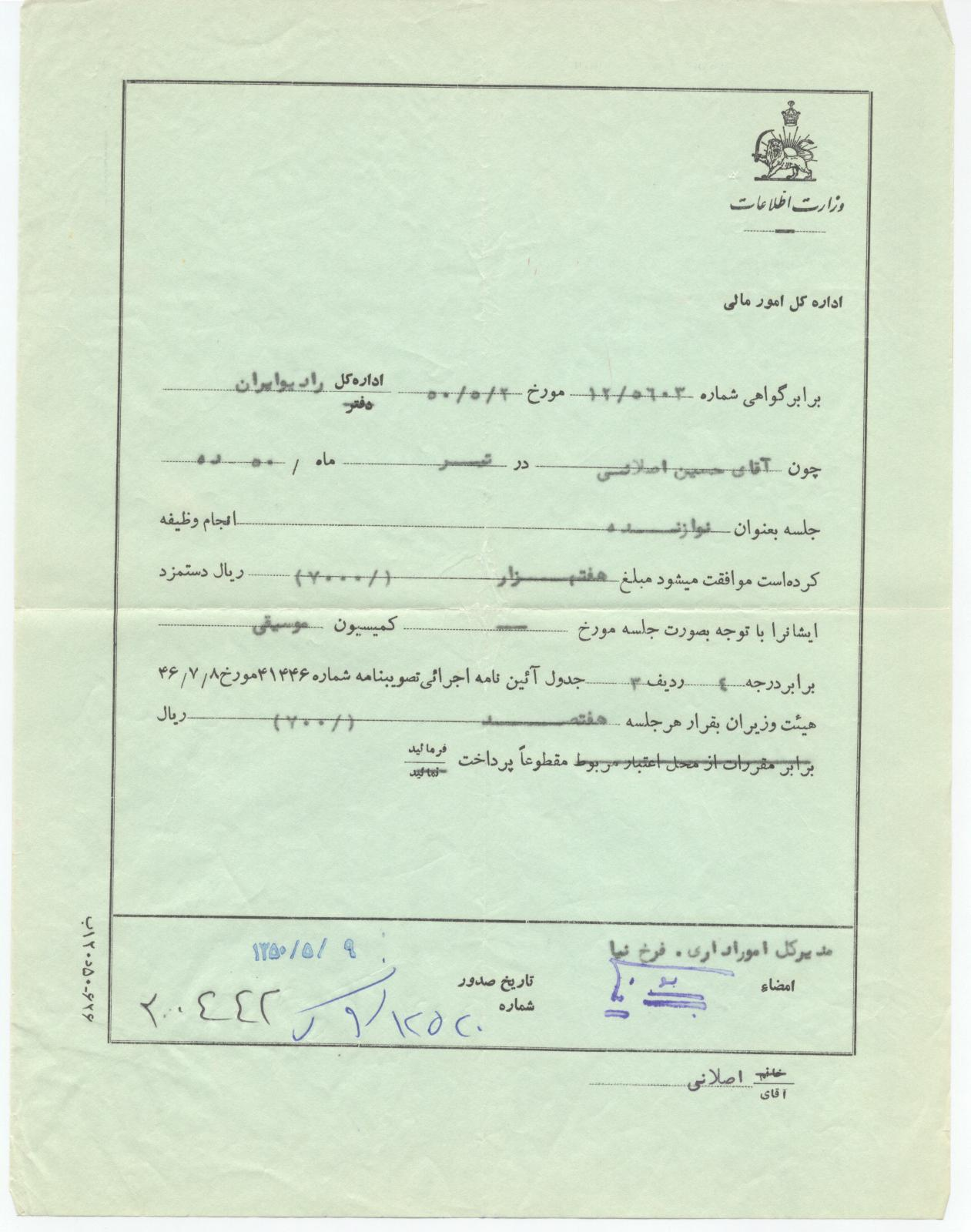
