= Pariyoush Ganji =

Iranian painter (born 1945)

- Born: 1945 (age 80–81); Tabriz, Iran
- Other name: Pari Yosh Ganji
- Education: Chelsea College of Arts; École des Beaux-Arts
- Known for: Painting
- Spouse: Masud Khayyam
- Children: 3, including Hooshyar Khayam
- Awards: Order of the Rising Sun (2015)

Pariyoush Ganji (Persian: پری‌یوش گنجی, born in 1945) is an Iranian painter, designer, and educator. Her artwork and design have been influenced by traditional Persian art. Ganji lives in Tehran.

== Early life and education ==
Pariyoush Ganji was born in 1945, in Tabriz, Iran. In 1948, Ganji's family moved to Tehran. When she was age 12, she participated in an art competition, which inspired her to study art.

Her school years at Behzad Art Academy, from 1963 to 1966, played an important role in shaping her visual language. Ganji was classmates with several known artists, including Bahman Mohassess, Ahmad Shamloo, Sohrab Sepehri, and Gholamhossein Sa'edi. She completed a formal art education at the Girls' School of Fine Arts, majoring in painting. She was a student of Mahmoud Farshchian, who is famous for his work in Persian miniature painting.

She studied in London, England. She participated in Saint Martin's School of Art classes and took art programs at the Sir John Cass School of Art, Architecture, and Design. In 1970, she attended Chelsea College of Arts and graduated after three years. Pariyoush Ganji started by selling her artwork before going to Chelsea College of Arts. She worked on "The Safavid Tiles of Isfahan" as her thesis, which is inspired by original designs and paintings of Iranian art. Although Ganji studied in other countries, she has maintained a sense of Persian culture throughout her artistic journey.

== Career ==
Ganji has sold some of her designs to textile-printing factories. She traveled to Germany in 1974, where she was hired as a designer for Dura Tufing GMBH. As she was in close contact with expressionist painters, she brought fresh visions to her designs. That was an opportunity for her to expand her skills and techniques.

In 1975, Ganji moved to France and took a course at Ecole des Beaux Arts in Paris, France. She worked on "the kinetic movement of esoteric arabesque designs of Persian carpets, inspired by the dancing human form".

=== Teaching ===
Ganji returned to Iran in 1976, collaborated with the center for the Intellectual Development of Children and Young Adults, curated an exhibition of their paintings, and illustrated a book. She was married and had two kids before returning to Iran to teach.

In 1986, Ganji taught at art schools in Tehran. She researched on the visual art of the Far East to find the influential elements of Sassanid Patterns on Japanese visual art through the Silk Road. Pariyoush Ganji has taught at places such as Alzahra University, Islamic Azad University, and University of Tehran. Also, she has been a member in organizations such as Tehran Cultural Heritage Organization, Contemporary Arts Museum, Tehran's Jury Memberships Contemporary Drawing, Handicrafts, and Tourism Organization.

=== Work in Japan ===
Ganji traveled to Japan in 1996 through the invitation of the Cultural Foundation of Japan; she studied the influences of Iranian patterns on Japanese textiles. It was in Japan where she learned about a Japanese technique called Sumi-e or ink wash painting, which she worked to master. That was when she produced some paintings that were, "blends of minimal Japanese Shojis and ornamental Persian windows".

=== Series ===
She stayed there for six months. A year later, Ganji worked on a new series called Red. The Red series were a selection of painting with red on black backgrounds. In the early 2000s, Ganji started working on the Night Windows series, which replaced red with purple. Night Windows are described to be new ways to historical occurrences to show the light through the darkness shaped by the many layers of purple. She then continued to work on other series called Roses, Day Windows, and Water, each with a different and continual direction for "searching the light".

=== Exhibitions ===
Pariyoush Ganji's work has been exhibited around the world. She has had around twenty exhibitions, and some of her paintings are an important part of the collections in Japan, the United Kingdom, and the United States. Throughout the four periods of Ganji's work, Ganji's paintings have been exhibited not only in Iran but also in England, Japan, United States, Germany, Kazakhstan, Saudi Arabi, Kyrgyzstan, Kuwait, Uzbekistan, and Switzerland.

== Awards ==
- 2015 – Order of the Rising Sun ((旭日章 Kyokujitsu-shō)) award, the government of Japan

== See also ==
- List of Iranian women artists
