= Mohammad Mehdi Goorangi =

Iranian musician and composer (born 1975)

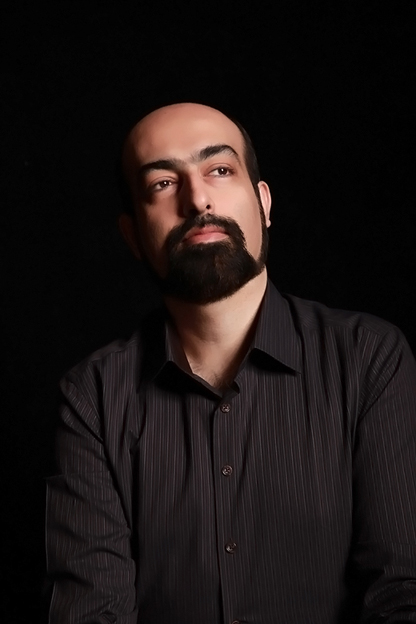

Background information
- Born: 23 June 1975 (age 50) Shiraz, Iran
- Origin: Iran
- Occupation(s): Composer, arranger, film music, film score composers
- Instrument(s): Piano, santour
- Years active: 1986–present
- Website: www.goorangi.com

Mohammad Mehdi Goorangi (Persian: محمدمهدی گورنگی; born 23 June 1975 in Shiraz, Iran) is an Iranian musician and composer.

== Life and career ==
Goorangi started playing piano and the dulcimer (the santur) at a young age. He gained his first musical experiences by composing songs for the Association of Education Organization when he was in high school. At university, he was instructed by renowned musicians including Mohammad Tagahi Massoudieh, Alireza Mashayekhi, Shahin Farhat, Sharif Lotfi, Majid Kiani, Mohammad Ali Haddadian, Mohammad Esmaili, Masood Shenasa, Amir-Ashraf Arianpoor and Mohammad-Reza Darvishi.

In 1995 he started working for the Islamic Republic of Iran Broadcasting (IRIB), composing and arranging melodies, songs and orchestral pieces. In 1996 he became a member of the Young Composers Association of the IRIB Organization, managed by Hassan Riahi. He started his professional career in film music by composing music for short films while he was a university student. Since then he has composed and arranged music for over 100 films, TV series, songs, melodies, orchestral pieces, animations, documentaries and plays of different scales and genres. At the moment, his major activities are lecturing at the university and composing soundtracks for movies and TV series. The album, A Truth Like an Imagination, released in 2015, is a selection of his six film and series scores. In 2018, he attained a PhD in Musicology in Georgia. In February 2017, at the unveiling conference of the national project "Book Partner - With the Pen", Goorangi was honored as the top partner in the field of books and reading.

== Professional experiences and qualifications ==
Goorangi is a member of the Composers Association in "Iran's House of Cinema Organization" (khaneye cinema), the Researchers and Composers Association in "House of Music Organization" (khaneye mooseghi), and (in 2010) the Education and Research Committee of IRIB.

In 2003 he organized a band and performed a concert based on the film Passenger from India (Mosaferi Az Hend). In the same year he wrote a book, The Creativity of Music (Khalaghiate Moosighi).

He has taught the basics of classical music and film music at the university since 2005. In 2013 he established the music department of Mehr-e-Taban Academy, an international school in Shiraz. He has been head of the music department at Soroush University since 2017. He has also been a jury member for the selection of films at the 18th Iranian Cinema House Festival, and Executive Director of "Salnava of Iranian Music".

== Albums ==
- Traveler from India
- I Can Read Too
- Loser
- A Truth Like an Imagination
- At the Sunrise
