= Mehr-e-Taban Academy =

Mehr-e-Taban Academy (Persian: مجتمع آموزشی فرهنگی مهر تابان)
- Shiraz, Fars; Iran

Information
- Type: Educational
- Established: 1993
- Gender: Boys and girls
- Language: Persian, English and French
- Website: www.mehrschool.com.

Mehr-e-Taban Academy (Persian: مجتمع آموزشی فرهنگی مهر تابان) (Mehrschool) in Shiraz, Iran was founded by Zahra Goorangi in 1993. Mehr-e-Taban Academy includes Mehr-e-Taban biliteracy-promoting school and Mehr-e-Taban international school. The school has three campuses in Shiraz and educates approximately 1500 students. Mehr-e-Taban offers education from kindergarten to grade 12. It is for both male and female and is one of the first schools in Shiraz which their main language is English rather than Persian.

Mehr-e-Taban is an international baccalaureate world school and offers a curriculum in the Primary Years Programme, Middle Years Programme and Diploma Programme. Among international baccalaureate schools in Iran, Mehr-e-Taban International School is the first school that offers three educational programmes. The academy's name is taken from the book Mehr-e-Taban written by Seyed Mohammad Hossein Hosseini Tehrani.

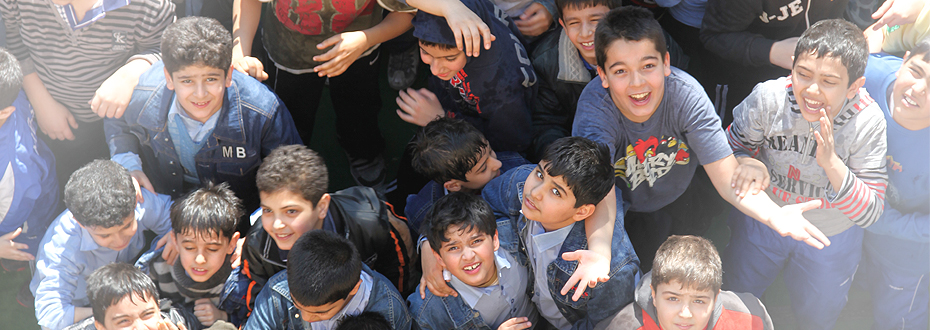
Mehr-e-Taban Academy

== Academic curriculum ==
At Mehr-e-Taban Biliteracy-promoting School the students learn Persian education in accordance with the requirements of the Iranian Department of Education. Moreover, they receive English in the afternoon. French is also offered as a subject from grade 6. Students participate in the IELTS test in grade 11.

At Mehr-e-Taban International School the language of instruction is English.

== Activities ==
The academy offers the following activities to students:

- Music

Mehr e Taban music department has started its activities since 2013. The head of department is Mohammad Mehdi Goorangi.

- Mehr radio

Mehr-e-Taban academy launched Mehr radio in 2006.

- Mehr festival

This festival is held by Mehr-e-Taban Academy and includes arts, literature and culture.

- Bahar festival

This festival is celebrated each February.

- Passion play

Mehr-e-taban academy holds a passion play about Imam Hossein each year in Muharram. The play is arranged with the collaboration of above 200 students of different grades.

- say No to a dangerous Chaharshanbe Suri' campaign

Islamic Republic News Agency reported that students in Shiraz signed a banner in support of say No to a dangerous Chaharshanbe Suri campaign and promised that on the evening of last Tuesday of the year they will not use firecrackers and explosives. According to IRNA, this banner has been signed by over 1500 students in Shiraz. On this banner which has been initiated by Mehr-e-Taban Academy, students, teachers and staff pledged and signed not to use firecrackers and explosives in commemoration of the Plasco event.

== Facilities ==
Mehr-e-Taban Academy provides the following facilities:

- Computers
- Library
- Laboratory
- Music

== A few examples of honors of the academy ==
- Attaining the Khwarizmi festival in electronics major and qualifying for the country phase
- Achieving the bronze medal of international young naturalists match
- Achieving the silver medal of the world choir festival in Russia
- Attaining the Ibn-e-Heysam festival at country phase
