= Niloufar Nourbakhsh =

- Born: Iran
- Occupation(s): Composer, Pianist
- Employer: Brooklyn Music School

Niloufar Nourbakhsh is a New York City-based Iranian composer and pianist, who founded the Iranian Female Composers Association.

== Early life and education ==
Born in Iran, Nourbakhsh is known for her contemporary classical compositions for piano, orchestra, chamber groups, voice, electronics, and mixed media. She began her musical studies at the piano at the Sarang Institute of Music in Karaj, Iran. At the age of fourteen, she entered the piano studio of Arash Abbasi, a composer and pianist at Tehran University. She won the 2nd prize of Iran's national piano biennale competition at the age of fifteen, performing at the Roudaki Hall. She completed one year of study in music and math at the University of Oxford. She then moved to the United States to get her bachelor's degree, receiving a B.A. from Goucher College in 2014.

== Career ==
Nourbakhsh currently resides in New York City and is a doctoral student in composition at Stony Brook University. She teaches piano at the Brooklyn Music School and composition students at the New York Philharmonic Young Composers program as a Teaching Artist Associate.

=== Iranian Female Composers Association ===
Nourbakhsh, along with Anahita Abbasi and Aida Shirazi, created the Iranian Female Composers Association. The association emerged while Niloufar started developing a concert to feature Iranian female composers at National Sawdust. Their first event was at National Sawdust in Brooklyn, NY, April 2018. The group's membership spans North America, Europe, and Asia and includes composers who write for Western and traditional Persian instruments. The mission of the group supports female composers—especially young women—from Iran through programming, commissioning, and mentorship. It coordinates public performances, interdisciplinary collaborations, and workshops.

== Selected works ==
Nourbakhsh composes for solo piano, orchestra, voice, chamber ensembles, and regularly incorporates electronic media into her compositions. Nourbakhsh's composition “F I X E D HbeaRt” for piano and live electronics was named as the First Prize Winner of the emerging composers competition by the Emilio del Rosario Music Foundation and was performed in Chicago as part of the Thirsty Ears Festival in August 2018.

Nourbakhsh gained attention for her vocal piece, “An Aria for the Executive Order,” in reaction to President Donald J. Trump's Travel Ban Executive Order 13769 as part of the Hartford Women Composers Festival. The text is taken from the Travel Ban and Philip Roth's 2010 novel Nemesis. The piece and Nourbakhsh was featured on NPR in March 2017.

- “F I X E D HbeaRt” for solo piano and live electronics
- “Firing Squad” for Reed Quintet and Fixed Media, commissioned by I-Park Foundation
- “We the Innumerable” – first scene of an opera premiered at Stony Brook University
- “Knell” (2018) for Orchestra
- “Run Run” (2017) for Orchestra
- “Lambda of Life’s Frequency” (2014) for Orchestra
- “I prologue II Lambda III Epilogue” for Orchestra
- “Syria, a Fractal of WE” (2015) for Violin, Bassoon, and Piano
- “White Helmets as white as death” for two violins and flute
- “No One is Born Hating Another Person” – for fixed media for Spark and Echo Arts
- “An Aria for the Executive Order” for voice and piano, commissioned by Women Composers Festival of Hartford
- “Thistle, Serenade” for soprano and piano
- “e, ee, ree, and I was free,” for Vocal Octet
- “Logic Run Wild” (2015) for Calidore String Quartet
- “She Waltz” (2014) for Violin and Piano
- “To the Lighthouse” (2014), a tribute to Virginia Woolf, for Soprano, Mezzo-Soprano, violin, piano, and percussion

== Selected commissions ==
- Akropolis Reed Quintet
- Calidore String Quartet
- Cassatt String Quartet
- Symphony Number One

== Selected honors ==
- 2017 > Women Composers Festival of Hartford
- 2017 > Spark and Echo Project
- 2018 > composer for PUBLIQUARTET
- 2018 > Composers + Musicians Collaborative Residency, I-Park Foundation
- 2019 > Hildegard Competition for Female, Trans, and Nonbinary Composers Winner
