= Ali Radman =

Iranian musician (born 1973)

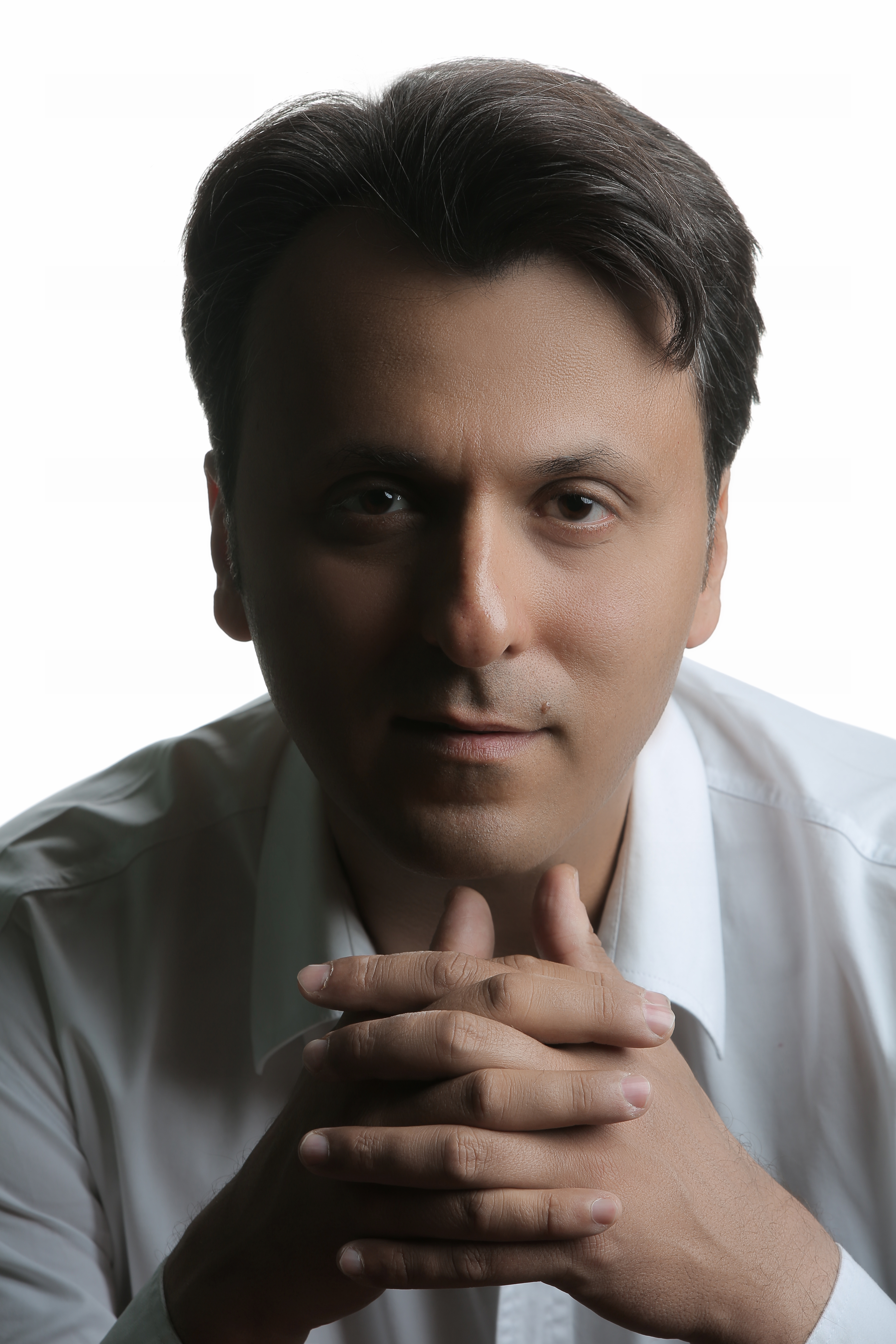

Background information
- Born: 1973 (age 52–53)
- Origin: Tehran, Iran
- Genres: Classical; contemporary
- Occupations: Composer, Conductor, Pedagogue and Pianist
- Website: t.me/Ali1Alii1

Ali Radman (born 20 June 1973) is an Iranian musician, composer, conductor, pedagogue and pianist.

== Life ==
Ali Radman was born on 20 June 1973 in Tehran, Iran. He was introduced to a classical music foundation and basic theory topics of music by his father, Mohammad Hassan Radman, from early age. He was improving his knowledge of basic elements of music, piano playing, and the theory of Iranian music under the conservatory teachers' supervision. At the same time, he was a sophomore in the field of electronics at Kerman University. In 1990, he was a member of UNIMA as a composer and in 1995, he was accepted as a bachelor student in the field of music at the Faculty of Fine Arts in University of Tehran.

In composition, he is an art graduate of the school of Alireza Mashayekhi. Besides music composing, he improved his knowledge of Iranian music repertoire through Majid Kiani 's lessons, the basics of ethnomusicology through Mohammad Taghi Massoudieh. He acquired the techniques of piano playing under the supervision of Raphael Minaskanian. He learnt techniques of orchestra conducting from Edo Mičič, Manuchehr Sahbaei and Iradj Sahbaei as well. He graduated from the Faculty of Fine Arts-University of Tehran. After his bachelor graduation, he started his master in the field of Music Composition at the Tehran University of Art. During his master, he enjoyed experiencing courses taught by Olena Dyachkova, Tolib Shakhidi, Hossein Dehlavi, Shahrokh Khajeh noori, Kambiz Roshanravan, and Ahmad Pejman.

== Career ==
He started his career as a composer in 1991 and composed some pieces for children's shows for Islamic Republic of Iran Broadcasting until 1994. In 1996, he cooperated with Tehran Music Group and the Iranian Orchestra for New Music, which was supervised and supported by Alireza Mashayekhi, and he performed several concerts with that orchestra as conductor and pianist. He joined the University of Tehran, faculty of fine arts, at the music department in 1999. In 2004, he began to teach at the Sooreh Institute of advanced education and the Farhang Institute of music in Tehran. He began cooperating with the contemporary music research center orchestra at the School of Fine Arts. He actively participated as a performer in all the CDs published by the Iranian Orchestra for New Music. He performed research concerts and other programs as a pianist and conductor in the Fajr International Music Festival. In 2008, he has presented some experiences in Iranian polyphonic composition under the title of "Persian Clusters". He served as the head of the department of music at Islamic Azad University, Shiraz Branch from 2009 until 2017. Radman founded Pars Contemporary Orchestra in 2011 and performed several orchestral pieces in various styles of composition. He held workshops at the Royal Conservatoire of Antwerp based on "models of polyphony textures in Iranian music" in March 2017. He was also holding out seminars and concerts at Tehran and Shiraz University based on "techniques of composing in the 20th century" and "Evolutions in composing in Iran". Radman is a member of the Association of the Iranian Contemporary Music Composers (ACIMC). He Achieved the First Class Medal of Art in Iran, 2013. His album named "Sialk-Eastern View" won the honorary award from the Fajr International Music Festival in 2022.

== Music ==
In composition, he has developed the rhythmic, melodic and timbre elements of Iranian musical scales with an approach to contemporary international music and the forms inspired by Iranian modal music.

His interest and focus in the composition is in introducing models inspired by Iranian folk music in polyphony, with an approach to contemporary music that is presented in different forms like orchestral, ensemble, solo, electronic and electroacoustic pieces. His several pieces are performed by various contemporary orchestras in Europe, America and Asia.

== Selected compositions ==
- Expression (I) for Solo Piano (1999)
- Expression (II) for Solo Piano (2000)
- Mani for Flute, vocal, and Piano (2000)
- Four Preludes for Solo Piano (1999–2001)
- Nava for piano (2001)
- Three Inventions for Piano (2001)
- Four Themes and Variation for Piano (1998–2002)
- Az Khavaran for Piano and Orchestra (2003)
- Music for Santoor and Electronic Sounds (2004)
- Sequence No. 1 for solo Tar (2004)
- Prelude and Fugue for Harpsichord (2004)
- Katibeh (Inscription) for Tar and Electronic Sounds (2005)
- Argument for 8 Santoors, Percussion, Ney and Contrabass (2006)
- A Musical Frame for Harp, Bass Santoor, and Dotar (2007)
- The Tale of the Town of Mirrors for Two Santoors, Setar and Piano (2007)
- Seminar of Colors for Iranian Ensemble and Piano (2008)
- Bootigha Symphonic Movement (2008)
- Kavir for Divan and Orchestra (2008)
- Dream of the Last Lullaby for Piano (2009)
- Ziggurat Voices Three Movements for Piano (2010)
- Masnavi for Orchestra and santoor (2011)
- Identity Symphonic Movement (2012)
- Siah Mashgh for Choir and Orchestra (2012)
- Diorama Symphonic Movement (2012)
- Fable of Statue for Electronic sounds, Choir and Orchestra (2013)
- Threnody of desolate land for choir, orchestra and electronic sounds (2013)
- Hashtgah for Vocals and Orchestra (2013)
- Jivar for Vocals and Orchestra (2014)
- Duet for Violin and Viola (2014)
- Four music for performer (2015)
- Duet in the market for Violin, Viola and Electronic Sounds (2016)
- Cold Moments of Darrous for Flute and Electronic Sounds (2017)
- Orgy in the Atmosphere for Electronic Sounds (2017)
- In Search of Lost Memory for Oud and Electronic Sounds (2018)
- Sialk, Eastern View for Orchestra (2018)
- Duet for Violin and Cello (2019)
- Wander About Me for Piano (2019)
- A familiar Portrait for Flute and Orchestra (2020)

== Festival and conferences works ==
- Performing in Bozar Festival in Brussels, Belgium by haftcraft-ensemble, 2017
- "In search of lost memory" in TRAIECT II festival in Hanover, Germany, 2018

== Publications ==
- Album named Katibeh (Inscription), Iran, 2009
- Album named "Fable of statue concert", containing four orchestral works, Iran, 2015
- "The Tale of the Town of Mirrors (Ali Radman)", album named New Music in Iran, Mahour Institute of Culture and Arts, Iran, 2019
- "Masnavi (Ali Radman)", album named Little Black Fish, Haftcraft Ensemble, Lemmens Institute, Belgium, 2019
- "Cold Moments of Darrous (Ali Radman)", album named "Iranian New Waves", Petrichor Records, USA, 2020
- Album named "Sialk-Eastern View", Petrichor Records, USA, 2020
- Film music for "Mirror-holder", a documentary by Pooyan Kazemi, Iran, 2020

== See also ==
- Music of Iran
- Persian traditional music
