= Shahin Farhat =

Iranian musical artist

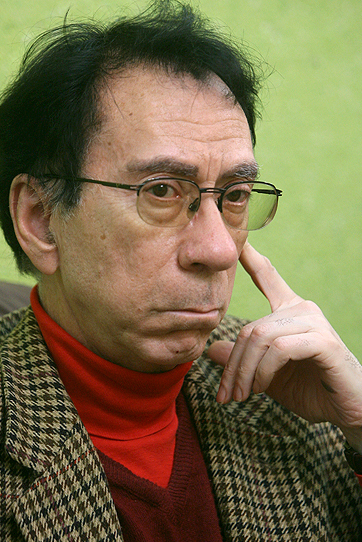

Background information
- Also known as: Shahin Farhat
- Born: 28 March 1947 (age 79); Tehran, Iran
- Origin: Iran
- Occupations: Composer, performing musician
- Instruments: piano
- Years active: 1969–present

Shahin Farhat (Persian: شاهین فرهت, born 28 March 1947) is an Iranian musician, composer and music teacher. As one of the most famous composers of classical music in Iran, he has created numerous works based on common forms in Western music, such as: symphony, concerto, suite, cantata, prelude, fugue, symphonic poem, rhapsody and other traditional methods, which often add space. Romantic music is near and at the same time it has not been without the influence of Iranian music. About twenty symphonies of his works have been recorded and published so far, which is the most numerous among the works of Iranian composers, which is why he is referred to as the "Father of the Iranian Symphony".

== Biography ==
=== Early years ===
Shahin Farhat was born on 28 March 1947, in Tehran. His father, Gholam Ali Farhat, was a physician, a judge of justice, and a student of Darvish Khan. His uncle (Ebrahim Farhat) was also a student of Darvish Khan. According to him, his mother knew French well, was considered a member of the Mostofi family, and his family history dates back to Hatef Esfahani, a poet of the Afshari and Zandi eras.

Shahin Farhat started learning music at the age of four or five, and learned the knowledge of Iranian music from his father, who was his first music teacher. He says that one day at the age of seven or eight, when he and his cousin spend the summer in Shemiran, he was influenced by works such as Beethoven's Overture Fidelio, Johannes Brahms' Hungarian dance, Camille Saint-Saëns' Dance of the Dead, and part of Symphony No. 94 by Haydn, which was broadcast on the radio, decided to pursue classical music in earnest.

He started playing the piano at the age of thirteen. He first studied piano with Carmin Osorio, a Spanish musician, and later with Emmanuel Malik Aslanian. The first piece he made as a teenager was a string quartet played by his friends, including Mohammad Sarir and Massoud Pourfarrokh performed at a home concert. From the age of 16, he composed pieces, some of which were broadcast on the radio at the same time. Farhat was also interested in theater as a teenager and acted in several television theaters. He completed his secondary education at Amir Atabak School in Tehran, receiving a natural diploma.

=== Years of music education and training ===
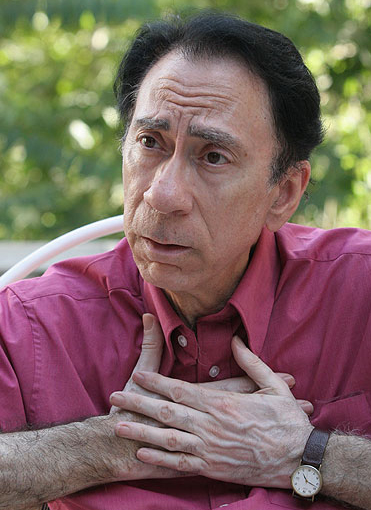
Farhat in 2007

After high school, Shahin Farhat decided to travel abroad to continue his education at the age of seventeen. At that time, because he did not have a student visa for music, he took a medical exam and was accepted to enter the University of California. Before the trip, his parents told him, "Change your major to music as soon as you arrive in the United States," and Shahin Farhat, who was happy and surprised, asked why. His parents argued that if he studied medicine, he would become an ordinary doctor, but if he studied music, he would surely become a successful musician.

Shahin Farhat followed his parents' advice. He went to the United States in 1964 and after two semesters of medical studies, he started playing the piano at UCLA. He followed the piano with artists such as Alfred Ponce. At this time, he composed his first professional piece at the age of 18. After living in exile for a year and a half, Farhat could not bear to be away from his family and returned to Iran before receiving his degree.

In 1966, at the same time as launching the field of music at the University of Tehran, he, along with artists such as Esfandiar Monfardzadeh, Dariush Dolatshahi and Massoud Pourfarrokh, was one of the first music students to enter the university. Like Houshang Ostvar and Thomas Kristen David. Finally, in 1970, he graduated from the University of Tehran with a bachelor's degree in music.

After receiving his bachelor's degree, Farhat went to the Sorbonne in France to continue his studies. He first studied music at the Sorbonne, but later moved to the University of Strasbourg, one of the most prestigious music universities at the time. He received his master's degree in musicology from the University of Strasbourg, France, and then traveled to the United States after receiving an invitation from the University of New York School of Music. He continued composing in the classes of Ezra Lederman (American composer) and received a master's degree in composition from New York University.For his composition dissertation at New York University, he composed his first work, Khayyam Symphony, based on eleven quatrains by Khayyam Neyshabouri. In 1976, it was performed by the Tehran Symphony Orchestra under the direction of Farhad Meshkat, with the voices of Hossein Sarshar (baritone) and Peri Zanganeh (soprano). He later remained for a time at New York University, where he was hired as a professor. He then returned to France to write his doctoral dissertation on the works of composers. Iranian wrote.

Shahin Farhat returned to Iran in 1976. A year later, when he decided to return to the United States, his father died and he remained in Iran. At this time he was employed by the University of Tehran. [9] In late 1978, he was appointed as the first director of the University of Tehran Music Department after the 1978 Revolution. Hormoz Farhat, a prominent Iranian musician, his cousin He taught him music at the age of 15 and was one of his professors at the University of Tehran when he was studying.

=== Activities ===
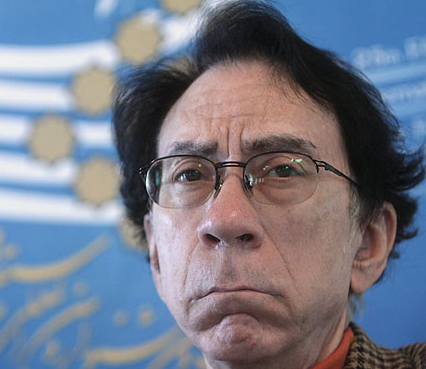
Shahin Farhat 2009

Farhat has been teaching in the Department of Music at the University of Tehran since 1976. He also founded a cultural institute in 1982, which includes a collection of Western classical music written by him. From 1982 to 1988, together with his brother Ali, through this institute, he produced, reproduced and distributed about two hundred cassette tapes of classical music. He left the University of Tehran in 1988 and went to Sweden, where his brother lived, with his mother. In that country, he learned Swedish and taught harmony and composition. He also taught Persian music in Sweden. Farhat was the first Iranian musician to teach Iranian music in Sweden. He is a professor at the Swedish Academy of Music in the field of composition.

After the death of Fereydoun Naseri, the leader and permanent director of the Tehran Symphony Orchestra, Shahin Farhat was appointed by the Policy Council of the Music Center of the Ministry of Culture and Islamic Guidance on 8 July 2005, as the interim conductor of the Tehran Symphony Orchestra. In 2005, for the second time after forming a music department at the University of Tehran, he was elected as the director of the music department of the Faculty of Fine Arts. In 2006, Shahin Farhat established the Not Museum. This museum was started with the support of the Music Office of the Ministry of Guidance, to preserve the scores and notes of the works of Iranian music artists. Farhat had proposed the idea of establishing a net museum two years before this date.

Farhat's other artistic activities include: Associate member of the Academy of Arts, Member of the International Union of Composers, Expert of the Ministry of Guidance, Permanent presence at the Fajr International Music Festival (secretary, judge, composer or speaker), Member of the editorial board of Fine Arts Magazine, Member of the editorial board of Maqam Music Monthly, Judge of the music section of the Book of the Year Award, Judge of the music of the Provincial Centers Production Festival IRIB, Judge of the "From Tawaf to Velayat" Festival, Judge of the Medical Students' Music Festival, Member of the Jury of the "Song of Mercy Festival", Judge of the Festival of Works and Productions of Provincial Centers of the Arts, Founder and head of Tehran String quartet, Master of

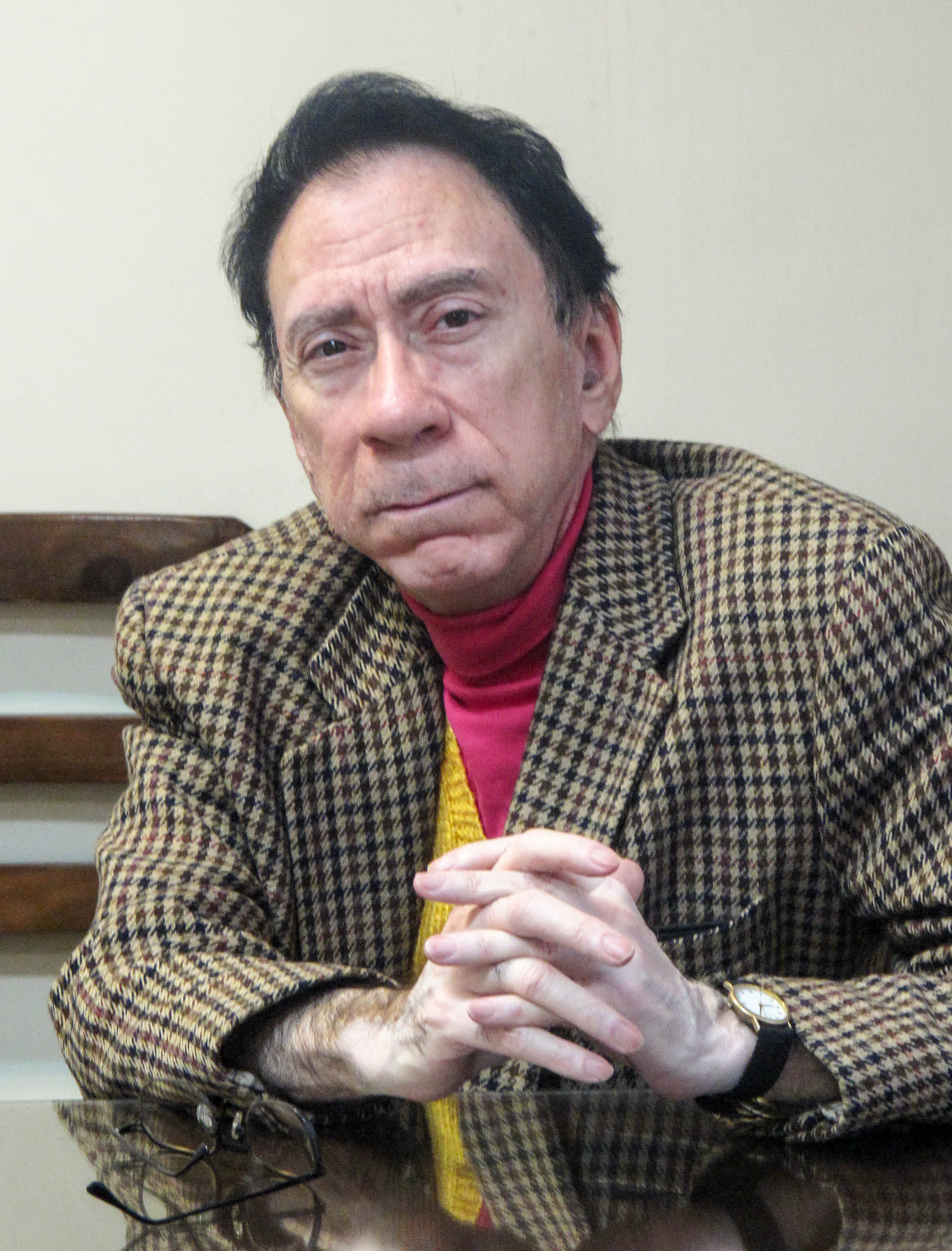
Shahin Farhat 2010

Compilation, University of Tehran, Music Advisor of the Iranian Cinema Museum, Member of the Supreme Council of Poetry and Music of the Radio, Member of the Technical Council of the Tehran Symphony Orchestra, Member of the Supreme Council of the Iranian Music House, Member of the Western Classical Music Policy Council of the Young Music Festival, and Member of the Policy Council of the 36th Fajr Music Festival.

=== Students ===
During his teaching career in Iran and abroad, Shahin Farhat had several students who, among the people who learned from him in Iran, could be artists such as: Mohammad Reza Darvishi, Giti Pashaei, Mina Oftadeh, Mohammad Jalil Andalibi, Abdolhossein Mokhtabad, Behnaz Zakeri, Mohammad Mehdi Goorangi, and... mentioned.

=== Private life ===
Farhat considers the first love of his life to be the first grade teacher of his primary school, Mahin Kasmaei, who later became one of the most famous dubbing figures in Iran. He has been married twice, both of which led to his separation. After her first marriage, she gave up composing for about three years due to the ups and downs of life. Shahin Farhat has two children, Sina and Roxane.

== Composing ==
=== Style ===
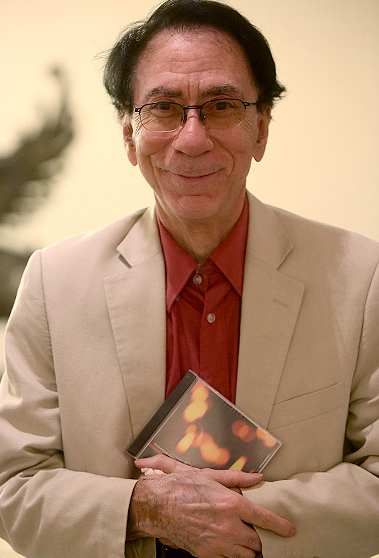
Farhat in 2014

Shahin Farhat's style of music, based on what he has learned, is mixed with harmony, counterpoint, orchestration and other techniques of Western music, and is inspired by the music of the Romantic period. In most of his works, a kind of obscure romanticism is felt along with nostalgia. Influential post-romantic composers such as Gustav Mahler and Anton Bruckner have been influenced. The sound of Farhat's works, although often far from the atmosphere of Iranian music, has not been without Iranian songs.

As a child, Farhat became acquainted with Persian music through his father's teachings, and later used Iranian themes and melodies in his compositions. Iranian has been used and in the third movement of this work, one of the colors of Darvish Khan can be heard. He has also used the poems of classical Iranian poets, such as: Khayyam, Hafez, Saadi and Ferdowsi in some of his works. Shahin Farhat says about Iranian music:

"... We have a very old music and if you pay attention, the names of our music corners even exist in the poems of Roudaki, Ferdowsi, Hafez and Saadi. The atmosphere of this music has survived in us until now and has been in the hearts of the people of this land and they have lived with this music ما Our music is honest music and does not lie…"

Farhat says about the use of Iranian music in Western forms:

"When it comes to performing works with an orchestra in an international style, I do not have the desire to perform works that are 100% derived from instrumental music such as Bayat Isfahan and Chahargah with the orchestra. کلی My general desire is for works with The form and context is international and their characteristics are such that when performing in various western orchestras, they are not considered strangers at all. "While I, as an unconscious Iranian, cannot be completely excluded from the Iranian music scene, it is certain that this is not what I do, as the songs of Ruhollah Khaleghi and Hossein Dehlavi sound like."

=== Style analysis from the perspective of others ===
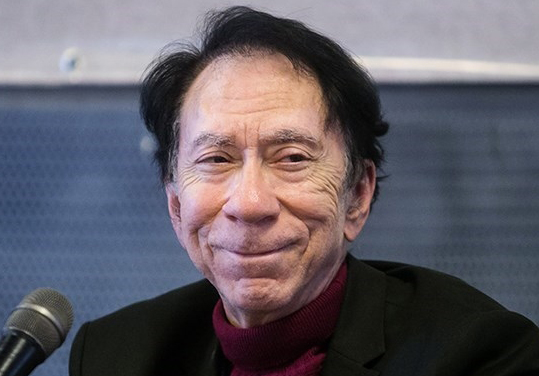
Shahin Farhat 2018

Kambiz Roshanrarvan considers Shahin Farhat to be a multifaceted artist, he says in this regard: "He is a good and capable pianist and very capable in his way of playing." The Enlightenment considers familiarity with new techniques in playing the piano as one of the characteristics of Farhat playing. According to the enlightened Kambiz, Farhat is a good composer and adheres to the advanced systems of world music, and all the charms of the form and techniques of contemporary music are evident in his works. The Enlightenment also describes Farhat's work as a "blend of Iranian and Western music culture" and considers him an experienced and unbiased teacher. Darvish Reza Monazami considers the pieces made by Farhat as works that, although rooted in Western classical music, can also be found in patterns of Iranian traditional music, and this feature can be a good model for composers and introduce more Iranian music. Manzemi believes that there are few people like Shahin Farhat in the field of classical music in Iran who, in addition to Western music, also know Iranian music and follow its example in their works.

Sasan Fatemi considers the most important feature of Shahin Farhat's works to be bilingual in contemporary Iranian culture and music. He considers the language of Farhat to be close to that of the late nineteenth and early twentieth centuries. According to the Fatimid Sasan, a symphony in Iran is not usually made on the basis of the real form, but Farhat is very interested in the form of a symphony whose primary core is the sonata, and the structure of its symphonies is strong and has form and content.

Mohammad Sarir believes that "there are few artists who have enough mentality and knowledge in listening music." He attributes this mentality to "Farhat's creativity", which is manifested in all his fields in his musical aspirations and ideas. According to Sarir, Shahin Farhat's interest and perseverance are rare and can be a role model for young people.

=== Critique of works ===
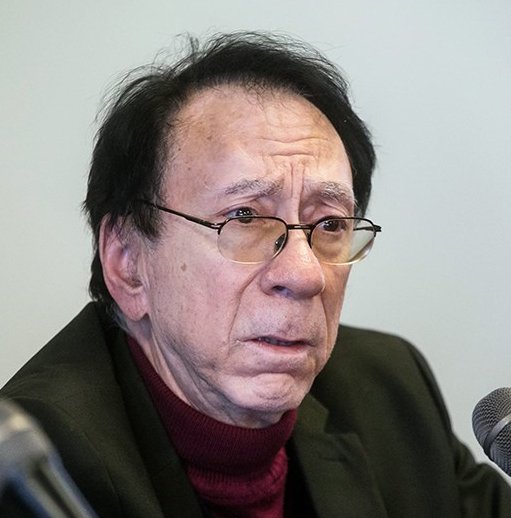
Shahin Farhat 2018

Some of Shahin Farhat's works, especially his symphonies, have often been sponsored by the government. For this reason, custom work and its production by government agencies on various occasions has always been discussed and reacted to by critics. Shahin Farhat is one of the most criticized composers in this field.

Farhat is the most prolific Iranian symphonist, but according to some experts; Although the works of this artist have been written in a completely correct and principled way in terms of music form and symphonic title, the content of these works has led to the dissatisfaction of the audience. In a way, the title "custom works" for the general audience of music is reminiscent of an original work commissioned by the government to promote the artist for specific purposes. Shahin Farhat, in the face of these criticisms, considers his inclination towards symphony as "occult relief". He does not know the difference between custom pieces and works that come from the artist's taste. According to Farhat, ordering is important for the artist in two ways: "It encourages him to write the work and tries to produce a good work. For this reason, ordering a work of art should not be confused with cross-sectional and immediate work. " It is not, but it is considered one of the masterpieces of the art world. "

=== Musical works ===
Shahin Farhat's works can be divided into three periods. The first period is the pieces written at the beginning of the academic education, these works are close to modern music and at the same time, thematic melodies are evident in them. Khayyam's symphony, Hafez cantata, trio for string instruments and sonata for piano The pieces are from the first period. The second period includes works that were formed after Farhat's education. The use of modern and in some cases Athena harmony is seen in these works. These works were inspired by the terrifying atmosphere of the Iran-Iraq war. Quartet No. 1 and 2, Symphony No. 2, 3 and 4 are among the works of the second period. The third period is the chapter in which, according to Hormoz Farhat, the composer has found his language and style. Works written from Damavand Symphony onwards can be called the result of this period. Farhat has so far composed about one hundred musical works in various forms, including symphonies, quartets and concertos, and several other pieces. In January 2017, he donated his music to the Museum of Iranian Music. About twenty symphonies by Shahin Farhat have been recorded and published so far, which is the largest number of works by Iranian composers, for this reason he is entitled " The father of the Iranian symphony. "

== Honors ==
=== Awards ===
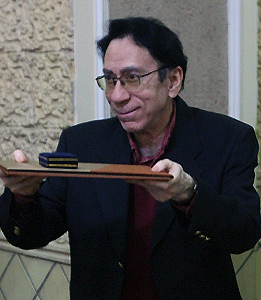
Farhat in 2007

- In February 2003, at the closing ceremony of the 19th Fajr Music Festival, Shahin Farhat was awarded a plaque of appreciation, a golden harp and 10 coins of the Spring of Freedom.
- In December 2005, at the 21st Fajr Music Festival, a statue of the Golden Harp and a festival plaque were presented to Shahin Farhat along with a cash gift.

=== Celebrations ===
- In 2004, Shahin Farhat was honored at the closing ceremony of the 20th Fajr Music Festival.
- In 2007, Shahin Farhat was honored at the Academy of Arts.
- In 2016, a commemoration ceremony for Shahin Farhat was held at the Andisheh Cultural Center in Tehran.
- In 2011, Shahin Farhat was honored at the closing ceremony of the first "Tawaf Festival to the Province".
- In 2012, Shahin Farhat was honored as the "Top Music Researcher" at the first ceremony of the "Professor Aghabzorg Research Award".
- In 2014, at the "Long Palace" conference on the occasion of Ferdowsi's commemoration day, Shahin Farhat was honored for composing the Ferdowsi Symphony.
- 2016, in the second "International Music Festival of the Prophet of Mercy", Shahin Farhat was honored for composing the symphony of the Prophet.
- In 2016, Shahin Farhat was honored along with several other artists at the "Birthday Wedding of Veteran Music Artists Born in the Spring".
