= Reza Najfar =

- Born: 20 April 1960 (age 66); Tehran, Iran
- Genres: Classical, Baroque
- Occupations: Flutist, Composer
- Instrument: Flute
- Website: http://www.najfar.com

Reza Najfar (born 20 April 1960) is a flute player and composer from Tehran, Iran, living in Austria. Since 1992, he is professor for flute at the Tiroler Landeskonservatorium in Innsbruck and the Prayner Konservatorium in Vienna.

== Biography ==
Najfar studied music and flute in Tehran, Utrecht and Vienna, at the Tehran Conservatory, Utrechts Conservatorium and University of Music and Performing Arts Vienna respectively.

During his studies, he was employed as a solo-flautist at the United Stages Vienna (Vereinigte Bühnen Wien).

== Career ==
In 2008, Reza Najfar won the "Persian Golden Lioness Award", in the category "Award for Excellence in Music", from the World Academy of Arts, Literature and Media (WAALM), which is located in London.

In December 2017, Najfar's arrangement of Erich Wolfgang Korngold's Der Schneemann premiered at the Musikverein in Vienna. Adapted for flute, violin and piano, it marked the first complete performance of the work since its world premiere, according to the Music and Arts University of the City of Vienna. It was performed by the Ensemble Triophonus Viennensis, featuring Reza Najfar, Setareh Najfar and Theresia Schumacher.

== Discography ==
- Serenata Italiana (with Esther Schobel, guitar) (1996)
- Divertimento Italiano (with Alexander Swete, guitar) (1998)
- The Magic Alto Flute (with Erich Faltermeier, piano) (1997)
- Tango Appassionato (with Alexander Swete, guitar) (1999)
- The Rare Encore (with Megumi Otsuka, piano) (2001)
- The Other Chopin (with Fausto Quintabà, piano) (2009)
- Slow Motion (with Fausto Quintabà, piano) (2011)
- Rare Encores (with Megumi Otsuka, piano) (2017)
- Bach & Bach (alto flute, solo) (2019)
- Farid Omran: Flute Sonatas Nos. 1 & 2 (with Megumi Otsuka, piano) (2023)
- Encore Encore! (with Megumi Otsuka, piano) (2024)
