= Ali Ahmadifar =

Iranian composer, teacher and researcher

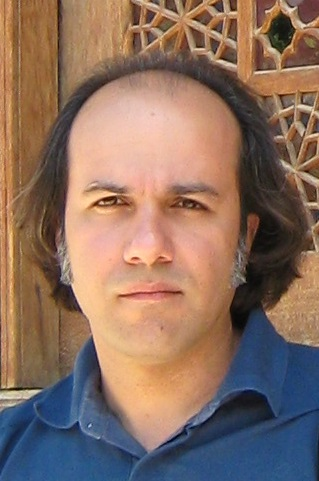

Background information
- Born: July 12, 1976 (age 50)
- Origin: Tehran, Iran
- Genres: Contemporary classical music
- Occupation: Composer
- Years active: 1996–present

Ali Ahmadifar (Persian: علی احمدی‌فر, born 12 July 1976) is an Iranian composer, teacher and researcher.

== Book ==
- Author of the book "Stylistics of Arvo Pärt music (Persian:سبک شناسی موسیقی آروو پارت)", published 2007.

== Works ==
- "Where are you, o thou fairy?"(An Iranian variation) was performed by MDR Leipzig Radio Symphony Orchestra in 2006.
- one of his works was performed by valid flute soloist Reza Najfar in 2008, Rasht.
- "Minimove" (An Iranian variation for flute and strings) was performed by Camerata symphony orchestra led by Keyvan Mirhadi in 2008, Rasht.
- "Bâng – e Robâb" was performed by the Avram ensemble in 2011.
- Radio contemporary music program editor and writer in Iranian radio broadcast network culture, 1999-2000.
- The founder and first conductor of Gilan sinfonietta orchestra and choir, performing concert at Vahdat Hall, September 2007.

== Lectures ==
- Concepts and specification of Music
- International Customary instruments and symphony orchestra
- Composition
- Orchestration
- Variation
- Canon and Fugue
- Sonata
- Form
- Symphony from the beginning until today
- Opera from the beginning until today
- Concerto from the beginning until today
- Chamber music from the beginning until today
- The impact of Liturgical music in the classical music
- Modernism in music
- Postmodernism in Music
- Minimalism, Post Minimalism and After
- Aleatory Music
- Musical Terms
- Nonserial Atonality Music
- Neo Romanticism
- Classical Serialism and Total Serialism
- Analysis of Bach's Chromatic Fantasia and Fugue
- Steve Reich
- Philip Glass
- Arvo Pärt
- Contemporary music
- Iranian composers
- Pathology of Iranian today music
- Dynamics and Rest
- Pluralism in post-tonal music
- Modern and contemporary harmony
- Stylistics and history of contemporary music
- The Development of rhythm
- The end of historic music and new history of music
- Authoring and translating professional articles about the contemporary music of world and Iran
- Head of Gilan music community organization, 2007-2011
- lecturer of University of Applied Sciences & Technology (UAST), Art and Culture Gillan branch, years 2009-2010.
- lecturer of music Faculty, Gilan University, 2011-2012.
- Jury member of Eleventh music festival of Khuzestan, Ahvaz February 2012.
- Teaching composition, stylistics and history of music in Tehran, Rasht and Ahvaz
