= Brooklyn Music School =

New school

Coordinates: 40.68698°N 73.97729°W

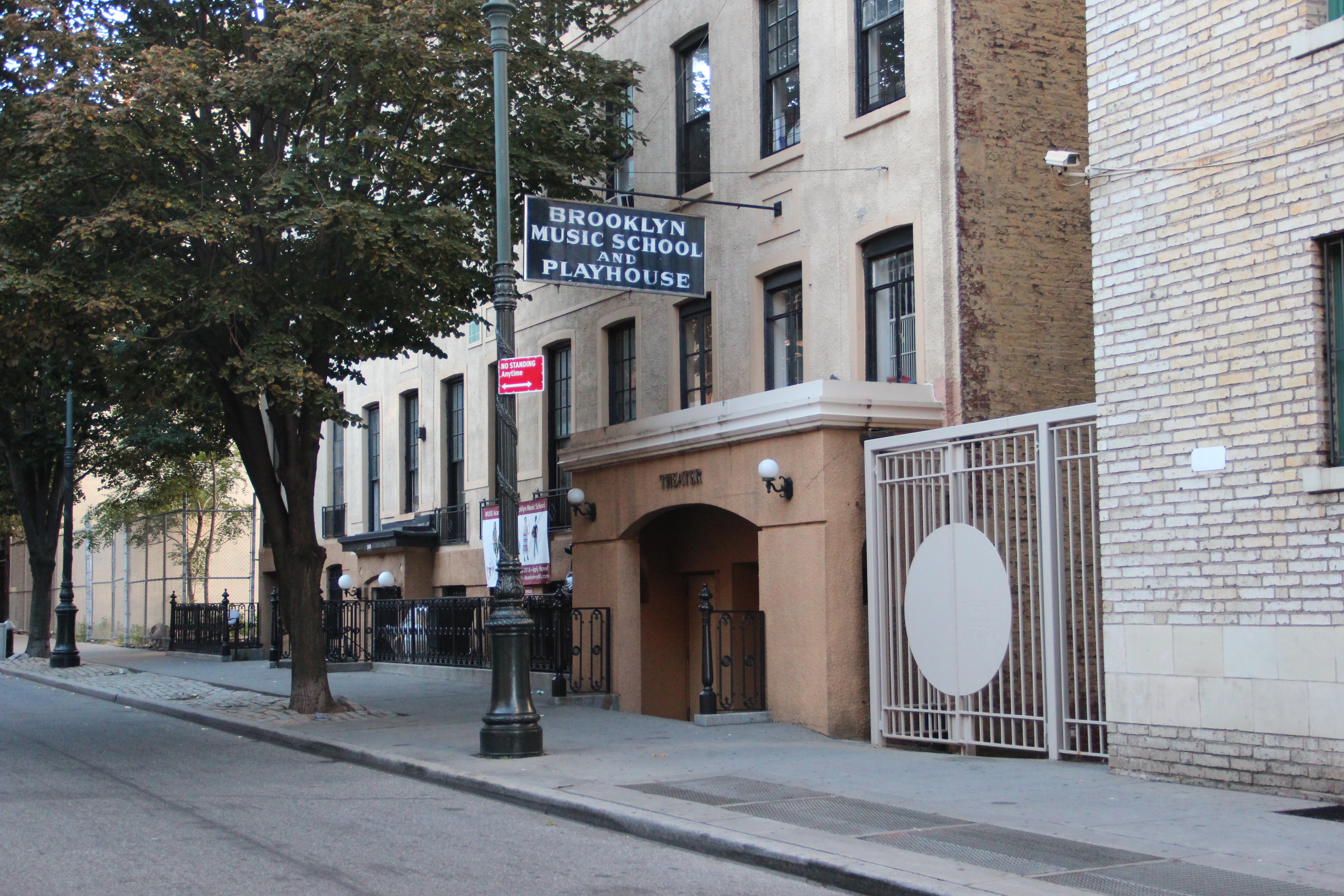

Information
- Established: 1909

The Brooklyn Music School is a community school located in the Fort Greene neighborhood of Brooklyn, New York that provides music education and cultural enrichment to over 6,000 families. Founded in 1909 as the Brooklyn Music School Settlement, it owns and operates a four-story building located at 126 St. Felix Street that contains twenty-four classrooms, three dance studios, and a 266-seat Spanish-style theatre. The school is a long-standing member of the National Guild of Community Schools of the Arts.

The Brooklyn Music School Playhouse was also the home of the Little Theatre Opera company in the 1920s. From 2011 until 2018, it was the home of Science, Language & Arts International School (SLA), a French and Mandarin immersion science- and arts-based elementary school.

Since its inception, Brooklyn Music School has prioritized serving underprivileged families and students who lack access to music education in their public schools.
