= Hooshyar Khayam =

Hooshyar Khayam هوشیار خیام
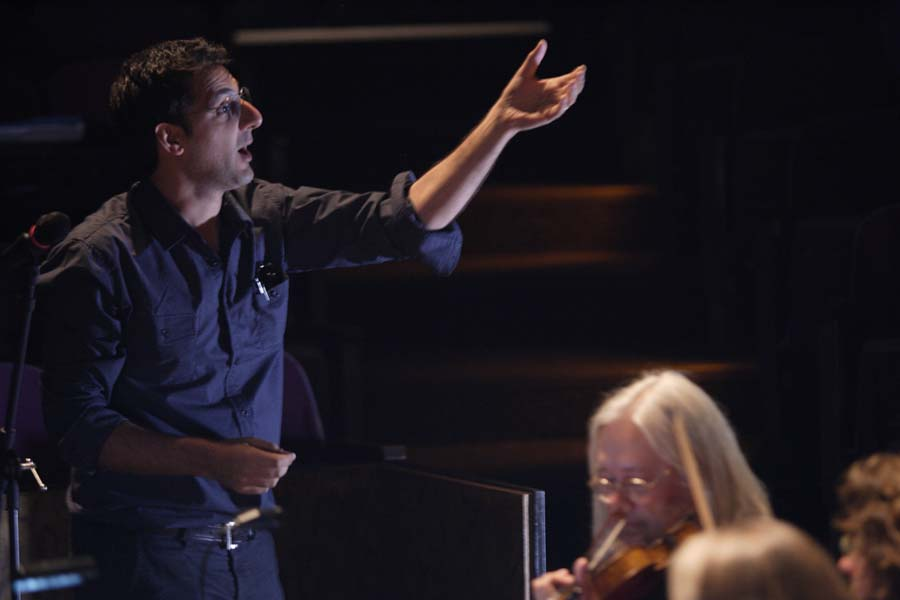

Background information
- Born: 11 May 1978 (age 48); Bedford, England
- Genre: Persian traditional music
- Occupation: Musician
- Years active: 1999–present
- Website: hooshyar-khayam.com

Hooshyar Khayam (Persian: هوشیار خیام) is a British-Iranian music performer, composer, and teacher. He lives in Ottawa, Canada.

== Early life and education ==
Hooshyar Khayam was born in 1978 in Bedford, England; to Iranian parents, visual artist Pariyoush Ganji and music composer Masud Khayam. He started studying music at the age of seven and studied music under the supervision of various professors.

Khayam obtained an associate degree in piano playing in music theory 1996; and a BA degree in 1997 from Trinity College London; and a BA degree in Iranian music from Iran Arts University in 1999. He has a BA degree in Iranian music from the University of the Arts London.

Khayam has a MA and a PhD in composition and conducting from the University of Cincinnati, College-Conservatory of Music, where he studied under Gao Weijie, Miguel Roig-Francoli, Lee Fiser, Ricardo Zohn-Muldoon, Mark Gibson, Joel Hoffman, Michael Chertock, and Robert Zierolf.

== Music ==
"… a true blend of Persian and European music…" (Songlines*****) Khayam's music blends influence of styles and music of extreme sources into new merged musical compositions. Khayam's music is often driven from various sources with curiosity towards new sonorities of instruments and instrumental combinations.

Kronos Quartet joined by the American pianist and producer Stephen Prutsman commissioned and recorded Khayam's music in production of Monir (2014) directed by Bahman Kiarostami, a documentary film on the life and art of the Iranian female visual artist Monir Shahroudy Farmanfarmaian. The film has been on show in Guggenheim, MOMA, ICA, TATE Modern, among other contemporary museums, and has been toured in Europe, Asia, and South America. Khayam's original music to Ivanov (2011) directed by Amir Reza Koohestani, a production by Mehr Theater Group, was staged in Lisbon, Campo Alegre, Heerlen, Utrecht, Amsterdam, Zurich, Basel, Hanover, Brussels, as well as in Iran.

Khayam's discography includes over a dozen publications including "RAAZ" (2020, 30M Records) Songlines 5-start choice Best Album of the Year (March/2021, Middle East), "Music for Tar and Piano" (Tehran Records, 2017) chosen Best Album of the Year MUSICEMA, "All of You" (Hermes Records, 2011) Songlines (75th issue) 4-star choice Best Album of the Year (Middle East).

Khayam's music has been performed by Kronos Quartet, Stephen Prutsman, Hossein Alizadeh, Anja Lechner, Aram Talalyan, Todd Palmer, Szofia Boros, Golfam Khayam, Mona Matbou Riahi, Elina Bertina, Evgeny Bushkov, Artur Avanesov, Wayne Foster-Smith, Eva-Christina Schonweiss, Kirsten Ecke, Burghard Toelke, Klara Ausserhuber, Morrison Trio, Scheherazade Ensemble, LSCO Orchestra, Naregatsi Strings, Ukraine Philharmonic Orchestra, Nilper Orchestra, Moscow Virtuosi Strings, and others.

During the period of working on his doctorate degree, he held many concerts including the concert of Khayam's quatrains and the 2005 concert of the Florence Music Festival in Italy led by Professor Jules Hoffmann. In the United States, he taught music theory and composition at the University of Cincinnati.

== Works ==
=== Orchestral music ===
| Name | Year | Description |
|---|---|---|
| Suite Poétique | 2000 | - |
| Concerto for Piano and Orchestra no 1 | 2003 | - |
| Calm | 2006 | For String Orchestra |
| Stained Glass | 2007 | For Piano and String Orchestra |
| Torkaman | 2008 | For Setar Trio and String Orchestra |
| Osyan | 2008 | – |
| Concerto for Cello and Strings no 1 | 2009 | – |
| Serenade for Violin and String Orchestra | 2010 | – |
| Before the Dream is Over | 2012 | for piano and orchestra |
| Kalileh, Ballet | 2015 | commissioned by LSCO |
| Daylight Twilight, Concerto for Cello and Strings no 2 | 2017 | – |
| Rhapsody in Turquoise, For Piano and Orchestra | 2016 -2017 | commissioned by LSCO |
| Triple Concerto for Kamancheh, Piano, Persian Percussions, and String Orchestra | 2018 | commissioned by Stephen Prutsman |
| Selection from "The Other Side" | 2018 | Arranged for string orchestra, premiered by Moscow Virtuosi Strings, conducted by Evgeny Bushkov |
| Pharos | 2020 | Concerto for Violin and Strings |

=== Chamber music ===
| Name | Year | Description |
|---|---|---|
| Piano Trio no 1 | 1997 revised 2013 | – |
| Cello Sonata no 1 | 1998 | – |
| Cello Sonata no 2 | 2003 | – |
| Two Pieces for Wind Ensemble | 2005 | – |
| Kubeh For String Octet | 2006 | – |
| Chang for cello and piano | 2007 | commissioned by Wayne Foster-Smith |
| A Proper Opening for string quintet | 2007 | – |
| Die Feen von Neukölln for violin and harp | 2007 | commissioned by Eva-Christina Schonweiss and Kirsten Ecke |
| Jala Piano Quintet | 2009 | Tribute to Rouhollah Khaleghi (Iranian Composer, 1906 – 1965) |
| I Waited for You in Rain Piano Trio no.2 | 2010 | – |
| Arco de Luna for two violins | 2010 | – |
| Rhapsody for Clarinet and Piano | 2012 | commissioned by Stephen Prutsman |
| Monir for String Quartet | 2013 | commissioned by Stephen Prutsman and Kronos Quartet |
| Garden I, for viola and guitar | 2013 | 2016, rearranged for cello and piano |
| Garden II, for cello solo | 2014 | 2018, rearranged for viola solo |
| On the Seashore String Quartet no.3 | 2014 | – |
| String Quartet no.4 | 2017 | – |
| Songs of the Quarantine | 2020 | for solo instruments |

=== Vocal music ===
| Name | Year | Description |
|---|---|---|
| Stardust | 2003 | based on poems of Iris |
| Book of Lonely Songs | 2005 | – |
| Rubaiyat (for soprano and percussion ensemble), based on poems of Omar Khayam | 2005 | – |
| Reeds (for countertenor and piano), based on prose by Rumi | 2007 | – |
| Moones set of seven songs for voice and piano) based on Persian traditional music | 2010 | – |

=== Piano works ===
| Name | Year | Description |
|---|---|---|
| Kaviri | 1993 | – |
| Sonata no 1 | 1999 | – |
| Tatari | 2001–2006 | – |
| Bahar Street | 2003 | – |
| Sonata no 2 "Jazz Sonata" | 2003 | – |
| Thousand Acacias | 1996–2010 | – |
| Sonata no.3 | 2005 | – |
| Sonata no.4 "en la memoria de un mar interminable" | 2009 | – |
| Sea's Seven Days | 2009 | – |
| Passacaglia Ravi-e Khyal | 2011 | Commissioned by Stephen Prutsman |

=== Works for film, theater, and animation ===
| Name | Year | Description |
|---|---|---|
| Trilogy "Terra, Freedom, The Sun Eclipse | 2020 | directed by Gorg (Cefalú Film Festival) |
| RAAZ | 2020 | directed by Gorg (Songlines *****) |
| Tehran Bach | 2019 | directed by Gorg |
| Wolf Game | 2018 | directed by Abbass Nezamdoost |
| God of Rakhsh | 2018 | directed by Gorg (Selected Cefalu Film Festival, Audience Awards) |
| Impermanent | 2016 | feature film by Amir Azizi (Candidate Best Film of the Year, 5th Beijing International Film Festival) |
| Spyker | 2015 | directed by Majed Neisi (war documentary) |
| Migration | 2014 | video art by Pooya Aryanpour |
| Monir | 2013 | directed by Bahman Kiarostami |
| Exhale | 2013 | videoart by Pooya Aryanpour |
| Ivanov | 2012 | directed by Amir Reza Koohestani, Mehr Theater Group |
| Everything Is Fine Here | 2012 | directed by Pourya Azarbayjani (Candidate Best Soundtrack of the Year, Jasmine International Film Festival, 2014) |
| These Days, Those Days | 2011 | directed by Pooya Aryanpour |
| Two Cold Meals for One | 2009 | directed by Amir Azimi |
| Namayesh | 2003 | animation by Elika Hedayat |

== Education ==
=== Awards ===
| Name | Year | Description |
|---|---|---|
| Recipient of OICRM Doctoral Fellowship | 2020–2021 | – |
| Composer in Residence, Festival 4020 | 2017 | Traumstadt" Linz, Austria |
| 1st prize winner of International Composition | 2011 | Competition "Franz Schubert Und die Musik der Moderne" Graz, Austria |
| 1st prize winner of "Accent 03" Composition | 2003 | Competition, University of Cincinnati |

=== Academic activities ===
| Activitie | Year | Academi |
|---|---|---|
| Contract Instructor, Carleton University | 2021 | Ottawa |
| Visiting Scholar, Carleton University | 2020 | Ottawa |
| Honorary Fellow | 2020 | City, University of London |
| Guest Composer | 2012 | University of Music and Performing Arts Graz |
| Assistant Professor, Music Department | 2005 – 2011 | 2013 – 2015 | University of Art, Tehran |
| Visiting Professor, | 2011–2012 | Komitas State Conservatory of Yerevan, Armenia |
| Lecturer, CMPCP Conference | 2011 | University of Cambridge |
| Honorary Fellow | 2011 | City University of London |
| Artist in Residence | 2010 | Goethe Institute Berlin |
| Lecturer, School of Advanced Study, Institute of Music Research | 2010 | University of London |

== Publications ==
Five volumes of Khayam's books have been published.

| Book title | Year | Description | ISBN |
|---|---|---|---|
| Selected Works | 1371–1378 | Nader Book Publishing | 9664925577553 |
| Music for Piano | 1380–1387 | Ebtekar No Publications | 9789646579477 |
| Orchestra Leadership | 1996 | Comprehensive Guide to Leadership Techniques and Practices, by Max Rudolph, translated by Hoshyar Khayam, Atai Publications | 964313555199 |
| Poet's Piano | 1997 | Selected Articles Related to Piano Playing, Atai Publications | 96431357878 |

== See also ==
- 2017 in classical music
- Ars lunga
- Hermes Records
