= Saman Samadi =

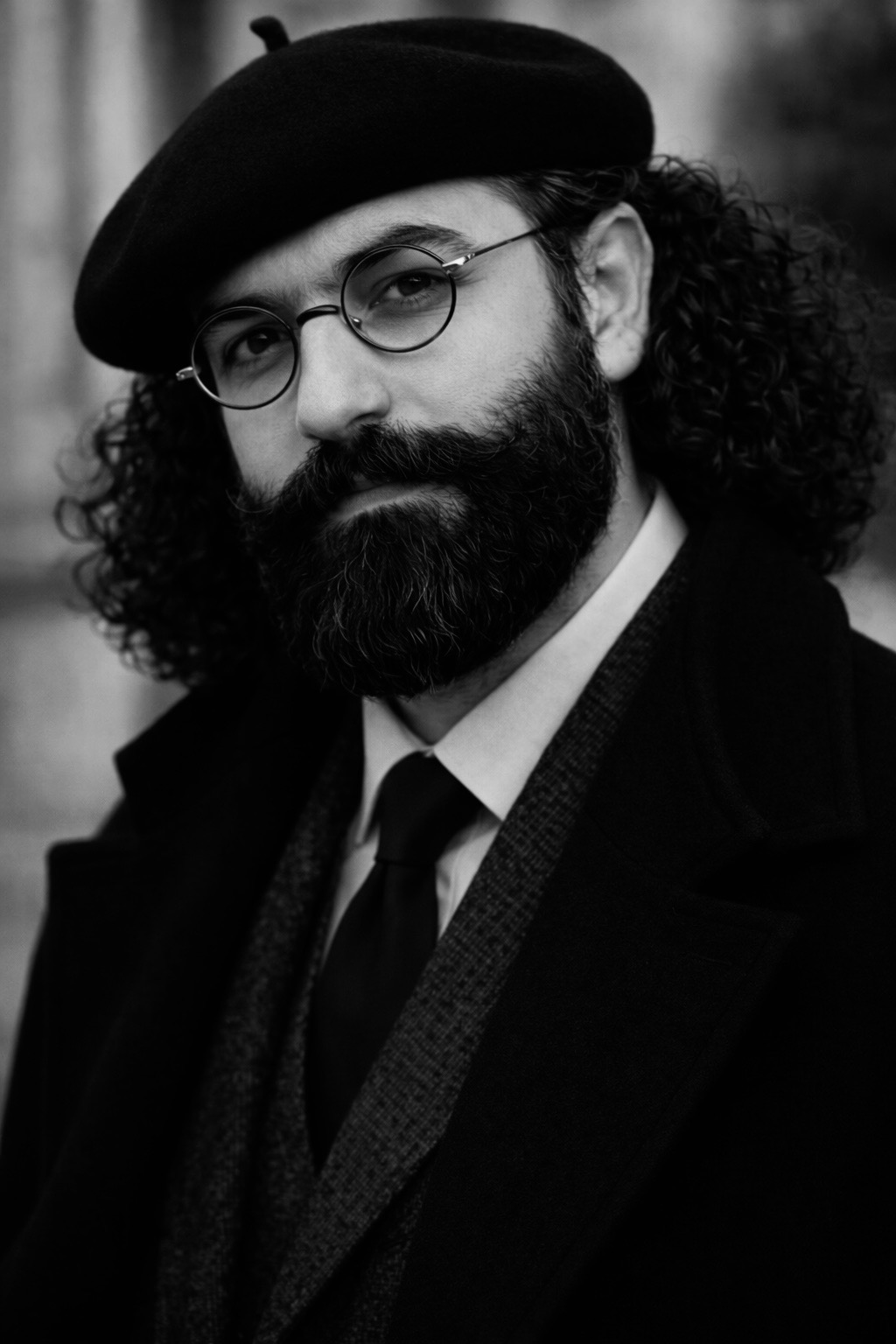

Saman Samadi (born 1984) is a Persian-American composer, experimental performer, artistic researcher, and philosopher of music with a prolific body of work spanning nearly twenty years. He earned his PhD from the University of Cambridge.

== Biography ==
Saman Samadi's compositional repertoire includes orchestral, chamber, solo, and electroacoustic pieces, which have gained international exposure through performances across various regions, including the Middle East, the Far East, Europe, and the United States. His research is centered on contemporary Western art music and Persian classical music, with a particular emphasis on advancing novel compositional approaches and musical experimentalism. He integrates creative practices with scholarly pursuits in cultural studies, (ethno)musicology, theory, and philosophy.

Samadi's compositions, characterized by a melding of complexity and expressivity, incorporate influences from Persian Classical music, poetry, language, visual arts, and postmodern philosophy. His work employs microtonal modes derived from Persian classical music, creating a unique pitch space with heterophonic textures, polyrhythms, and polymeters.

Samadi reimagines Persian calligraphy, incorporating it as both visual and structural elements in his Augenmusik scores, thus creating a multi-dimensional experience that echoes with philosophical and poetic qualities.

As a scholar, Samadis research interests span a wide spectrum of interdisciplinary areas, including ethnomusicology, composition, poststructuralism, semiotics, music and identity, linguistics, aesthetics of modernism and postmodernism, conceptual history, continental philosophy, Deleuze and Guattari, complexity, music notation, experimental music, and performance practice of new music.

Saman Samadi began his education at NODET, a renowned institution for mathematical prodigies in Iran, where he obtained a degree in Mathematics and Physics. He continued his studies in Philosophy and Critical Thinking at the University of Queensland, and Artistic Research at the Orpheus Institute and Leuven University. He earned a Bachelor of Arts in Music Performance and a Master of Arts in Composition from the University of Tehran. Samadi studied composition with Alireza Mashayekhi, who was a student of Hanns Jelinek, a pupil of Arnold Schoenberg and Alban Berg. Samadi directed the Concentus Orchestra from 2006 to 2009, an ensemble composed of musicians from the Tehran Music Conservatory and the University of Tehran. He received recognition by winning the first prize at the 2012 Counterpoint-Italy International Composition Competition. In 2014, his work was selected for premiere at the New York City Electroacoustic Music Festival.

From 2013 to 2020, Samadi actively participated in New York City's experimental music scene. In 2018, he founded the Saman Samadi Quintet, bringing together alumni from the Manhattan School of Music. He also led two other ensembles based in New York City: the Apām Napāt Trio and the Aži Trio. In recognition of his contributions to the performing arts, particularly as an experimental music improviser, the New York Foundation for the Arts (NYFA) awarded him an Artist Diploma in 2015. Samadi has served as a faculty member at the Music School of New York City and the Piano School of NYC. Samadi has served as the Editorial Officer for the Wolfson Research Event at Cambridge and actively participates in reviews for reputable journals, including the Journal for Artistic Research.

Samadi conducted his doctoral research from 2020 to 2023 at the University of Cambridge under the supervision of Richard Causton and Peter McMurray. His academic achievements were recognized and supported through his appointment as a Dr Grantham Scholar. Samadi founded and led the Cambridge University Experimental Music Ensemble. During his time at Cambridge, Samadi served as President of the Wolfson College Music Society and academic supervisor at the Faculty of Music at Cambridge.

== List of works ==
- Shattering in Seven Pieces for Dream and Wedding and Death, for string quartet — 2022
- Avec Boulez, Mallarmé, et Foucault, for ensemble — 2022
- Through a Veil, for wind quintet and fixed media — 2021
- Thus Spoke Earth, for violin and piano and fixed media — 2021
- Vāyuvēra, for Piano Trio — 2021
- Ānam Ārezust, for Ensemble — 2020
- Aša, for Flute — 2020
- The Gāthās for Piano — 2018–2019
1. Ahunavaiti Gāthā no.1, stanza I
2. Ahunavaiti Gāthā no.1, stanza II
3. Ahunavaiti Gāthā no.1, stanza III
- Mira, for Violin and Electronics — 2015–2019
- Scheherazade, Saxophone Quartet No.2 — 2017
- Nostalgia, An electroacoustic album including five pieces – Samadis’ Records Released: November 7, 2016
1. Ghorbat
2. Berceuses
3. Vāyu
4. Retroception
5. Hura
- Chamrosh, Works for Saxophone – Samadis’ Records Released: April 1, 2016
1. Chamrosh, for Tenor Saxophone
2. I-V-complex No.1, for Alto Saxophone and Piano
3. I-V-complex No.2, for Saxophone Quartet
4. Before Your Very Eyes, for Saxophone and Piano
- Apām Napāt, An electroacoustic album including sixteen pieces – piano, reeds, buchla – Samadis’ Records Released: February 27, 2016
1. Ap
2. Asha
3. Daeva
4. Yima
5. Ariyāramna
6. Vivanhant
7. Haoma
8. Verethragna
9. Yasna
10. Apām Napāt
11. Anahita
12. Hauruuatāt
13. Ahura
14. Manu
15. Zahhak
16. Mithra
- Shekasteh Mouyeh, An electroacoustic album including nine pieces, Samadis’ Records Released: February 23, 2015
1. Frenzied
2. Shattered Mourning
3. Injustice
4. Desolation
5. Ramkali
6. Zenith
7. Dissident
8. Dashtestani
9. Satori
- U-Turn, An electroacoustic album including five pieces, Samadis’ Records Released: March 14, 2015
1. Safhe-ye Nakhl (Palm Plate), for Dozaleh, Piano, Tape and Live Electronics (2014)
2. Amiri, for Electronics (2012)
3. Ghatar-e Arvah (Ghosts' Train), for Electronics (2010)
4. Magnapinna in Abdomen of a Newborn, for Electronics and video (2012)
5. U-Turn, for Electronics and video (2011)
- Microtonal Piano Solos, An album including eleven pieces as a set, Samadis’ Records Released: January 7, 2015
1. Oracle
2. Solitude
3. Sisyphus
4. Annica
5. Perception
6. Madman
7. Satire
8. Existence
9. Deprivation
10. Magnetic
11. Subjectivity
- Teryan, for Violin and Piano — 2014
- Persia 1909, for Chamber Ensemble — 2014
- Panj, for Orchestra — 2013
- Gulhannai, for Piano — 2013
- Tears' Scratch, for Violin duo — 2012
- La Nausée, for Piano — 2012
- Sound and Fury, for Chamber Orchestra — 2012
- Paj, for Flute and Piano — 2011
- Bazzad, for Violin and Symphony Orchestra — 2011
- Symphony in Three Movements, for Large Orchestra — 2009
- Impromptu, for Piano — 2008
- Wine, for Piano — 2008
- Eastern Rhapsody, for Piano — 2008
- Sonatina, for Piano — 2008
- Fog & Fugue, for Guitar — 2007
- Camisado, for Chamber Orchestra — 2007
- Is This the World We Created...?, for Alto, Baritone, Choir, and Orchestra — 2007 Duet for Horn and Piano, for Horn and Piano — 2007
- Nausea, for Orchestra — 2007
- A Piece for Violin and Orchestra — 2007
- Two Nights, for Oboe, Horn, Violin, Cello, and Piano — 2007
- Sheyda, for String Orchestra — 2006
