= Kayvan Mirhadi =

Kayvan Mirhadi کیوان میرهادی
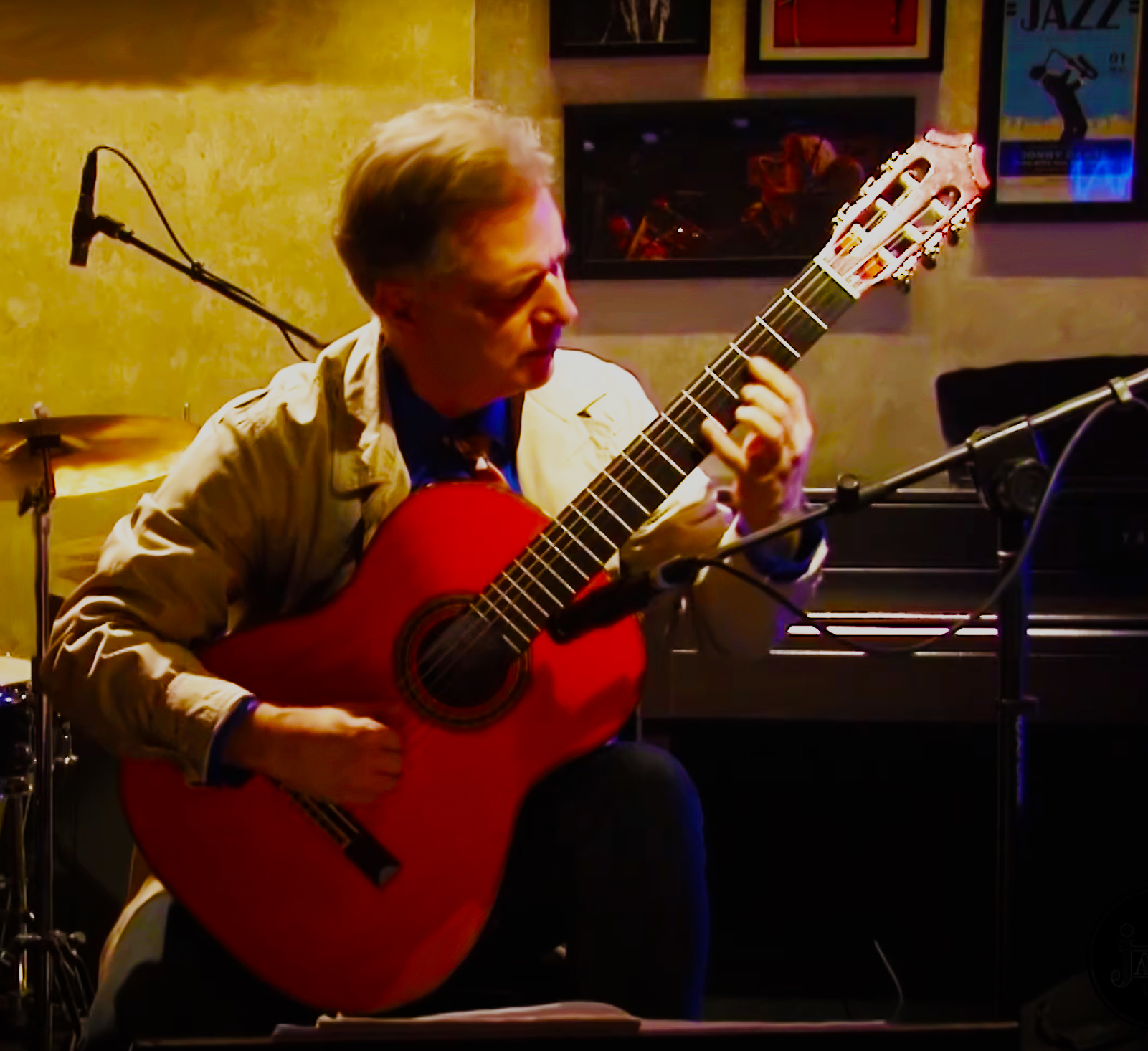
- Kayvan Mirhadi in Tehran Jazz Cafe.

Background information
- Born: Kayvan Mirhadizadeh; January 20, 1960 (age 66); Tehran
- Origin: Tehran, Iran
- Genres: Classical, Jazz
- Occupations: Guitarist, Composer, Conductor
- Instrument: Guitar
- Years active: 1980–present

Kayvan Mirhadi (also spelled "Keyvan Mirhadi", keivanmirhadi, Persian: کیوان میرهادی, born January 20, 1960) is an Iranian guitarist, composer, conductor and music educator.

== Early life ==
Mirhadi was born in Tehran and started playing guitar at age 9. He began learning classical guitar under Simon Ayvazian in 1980.

== Career ==
Keyvan Mirhadi is a prominent instructor at the academic level. He teaches at universities and colleges in Tehran. Mirhadi's publications are used as a reference for guitar players and music students.

Mirhadi taught courses in choir, guitar, music theory and history of music in various universities, colleges, institutes and master classes such as:

- University of Tehran
- Azad University
- Tehran Conservatory of Music
- Tehran College of music (Honarestan),
- Elmi-Karbordi University branch 46.
- Master classes

== Performance ==
In the course of his career Mirhadi has conducted many choirs and chamber orchestras dedicated to classical music.

=== Camerata Orchestra ===
Mirhadi is the founder and conductor of the Camerata Orchestra. Camerata performs various genres of music from classical (Philip Glass, Arvo Pärt) to rock (Nirvana, Pink Floyd, Scorpions, Iron Maiden). One of their most notable performances took place in Aix-en-Provence Cathedral. This was the first performance by an Iranian private orchestra beyond Iran. Camerata played on more than 60 different stages in the course of ten years. Camerata premiered two of Mirhadi's guitar concertos in Tehran in August 2018.

=== Fusion Concert ===
Transcription of Massoud Shoari pieces for large classical-traditional ensemble, 2003 at the Tehran Opera House (Vahdat Hall).

== Film score ==
He scored La Vie des Pieds by Mehdi Javanbakht Samani, in 2007

Mirhadi composed the score for movie La Vie des pieds by Mehdi Javanbakht Samani in 2007. The movie was selected as best music in international short film festival du Court Metrage in France.

== Competitions ==
=== Tehran Guitar Competition ===
Founder and Director since 2002

Mirhadi is the Director of the Tehran Guitar Competition. He is the designer of the program and is the senior member of the Jury.

=== Better Guitar Competition ===
Guitar Bartar ( گیتار برتر: فارسی) is the sister competition of Tehran Guitar. Mirhadi is the CEO and Director of the program since 2003.

=== Isfahan Guitar Competition ===
Mirhadi was the art director and Jury senior member of the Isfahan competition in 2004.

== Sources ==
- تکنیک گیتار (دوره متوسطه و دوره پیشرفته)هکتور کواین، کیوان میرهادی
- یک قرن موسیقی مدرن: وقایع سال های 1894 تا 1994 میلادی، پل گریفیث، نشر افکار، کیوان میرهادی
- گیتاریست کلاسیک، کیوان میرهادی
- موسیقی از الف تا ی، ۱۳۸۰، نشر تنویر، کیوان میرهادی
- از نواهای محزون سیاهپوستان مهاجر تا عاشقانه های پورتر، بیدار مهر، 1382 ،شماره 22، کیوان میرهادی
- Golestaneh magazine, Essay
- Philip Glass: string quartets No2,3&5 transcribed for four classical guitars and performed by Kayvan Mirhadi
- Philip Glass: Harpsichord Concerto, Transcribed for four classical guitars and performed by Kayvan Mirhadi
- "Koneh Hawaran", A tanbur and Vocal work based on the Kurdish traditional Love and funeral Themes for string ensemble, iTunes-Oido records-2014
- "LIKOO", a jazz album with O.R.P quartet. Featuring Jerry Gonzalez on trumpet, iTunes, Oido records - 2013
- "Concierto de Aranjuez": Kayvan Mirhadi: Guitar, Music Minus One
