= Fouzieh Majd =

Persian composer and ethnomusicologist

Fouzieh Majd (also spelled Fozie Majd) (Persian: فوزیه مجد) is a Persian composer and ethnomusicologist. She was educated in England and France. In the 1970s she was the head of a group to gather Persian folk songs at NITV.
