= Mohammad Taghi Massoudieh =

Iranian musician and composer (1927–1999)

Mohammad Tagahi Massoudieh

Background information
- Also known as: Mohammad Tagahi Massoudieh
- Born: 10 April 1927; Mashhad, Imperial State of Iran
- Origin: Iran
- Died: 1 February 1999 (aged 71) Tehran, Iran
- Occupations: Composer, performer
- Instrument: Violin

Mohammad Tagahi Massoudieh (Persian: محمدتقی مسعودیه; 10 April 1927 – 1 February 1999) was an Iranian musician, researcher, music author and composer. He has been referred to as the "Father of Iranian Ethnomusicology".

== Biography ==
Mohammad Tagahi Massoudieh was born on 10 April 1927, in Mashhad and from an early age he learned to play the violin and became interested in music. After completing his primary education in the Elmiyeh primary school in Mashhad, he received his diploma in 1945 from Shahreza High School in the same city. At the age of 18, he moved to Tehran with his family. In 1946, he received his literary diploma from Dar ul-Funun High School in Tehran.

Massoudieh completed his higher education in 1950 at the Faculty of Law and Political Science, University of Tehran, and at the same time studied music at the Tehran Conservatory of Music. He received a law degree and a diploma in music. After that, he left for France to continue his studies at the National Conservatory of Music in Paris. After passing the entrance exam for the Paris Conservatory to study the violin, he went to see Professor Lynn Talwell. He took such lessons as Harmony with Georges Dandello and Counterpoint with Noel Galan from masters of European classical music. In 1954, he received a master's degree in harmony from the Paris Conservatory, which was a special event in its own right because until then, no Iranian had been able to receive a degree in music with a focus on harmony from this center.

Mohammad Taghi Massoudieh succeeded in going to Germany to continue his studies at the Leipzig High School of Music, using the scholarship of the International Students' Union. After leaving for Germany to study, Massoudieh chose the field of composition and benefited from two of the most prominent European composers, Otmar Gerster Johannes Viruch. At the age of 36, Massoudieh received a doctorate in composition from the Leipzig Conservatory in Germany.

Massoudieh then moved to Cologne, where he studied musicology (historical musicology) under Carl Gustav Felerer and ethnomusicology (comparative musicology) under Marius Schneider at the University of Cologne. In 1968, he succeeded in obtaining a specialized doctorate in this field. His doctoral dissertation entitled "Avaz e Shour" was published in 1968, in the city of Regensburg, wandis one of the most authoritative books in German about Iranian classical music. After graduating, he returned to Iran and studied at Tehran University of Fine Arts.

Massoudieh for the first time introduced many specialised courses related to music to the University of Tehran, including the history of European music, advanced and practical harmony, form and analysis, harmonics, orchestration, transcription, and various ethnomusicological topics. Massoudieh's efforts to teach and transfer the scientific concepts of music earned him the title of the father of Iranian ethnomusicology. He did a lot of research in the field of Iranian folk music and traditional Iranian music and proposed many scientific theories in various forms of Iranian music that had no precedent until then.

== Works of art and activities ==
=== Musical works ===
Twenty-one pieces of music are left from Massoudieh, including:

- Two movements for string instrument orchestra
- Symphonic movements

=== Written works ===
==== Books ====
- Mohammad Tagahi Massoudieh. Āvāz-e-šūr-, Zur Melodiebildung in der Persischen Kunstmusik. Regensburg: Gustav Bosse, 1968
- Mohammad Tagahi Massoudieh und Josef Kuckertz, Muzik in Būšehr (sūd Iran). Müncgen/Salzburg: Emil Katzbichler, 1976
- Mohammad Tagahi Massoudieh, Radif Vocal de le Musique Traditionnelle de L’Iran. Version de Mahmüd-e-Karīmī. Tehran: Editions soroushe, 1987
- Mohammad Tagahi Massoudieh, Muzik in Balüčestān, Teil II. Hamburg: Karl Dieter Wagner, 1988
- Mohammad Tagahi Massoudieh, Manuscrits Persans Concernant la Musique. RISM, B XII. München: Henle Verlag, 1996
- Mohammad Tagahi Massoudieh, Torbat Jam Music. Tehran: Soroush, 1980.
- Mohammad Tagahi Massoudieh, Fundamentals of Ethnomusicology. Tehran: Soroush, 1986.
- Mohammad Tagahi Massoudieh, Iranian religious music, the first book (Music Of Ta'zieh). Tehran: Soroush, 1988.
- Mohammad Tagahi Massoudieh, Turkmen music. Tehran: Mahour Cultural-Artistic Institute. 2000.
- Mohammad Tagahi Massoudieh, Iranian instruments. Tehran: Negar, 2005.
- Mohammad Tagahi Massoudieh, Instrumentation. Tehran: Soroush, 2010.

==== Articles ====
- Mohammad Tagahi Massoudieh, “Die Melodie Matnawi in der Persischen Kunstmisik”, Orbis Musicae, Vol. 1, no. 1, 1971, pp. 57–66
- Mohammad Tagahi Massoudieh, “Hochzeitsliederaus Balüčestān”, Jahrbuch für Musikalische volks-u. Völkerkunde, B. 7., 1973, pp. 58–69
- Mohammad Tagahi Massoudieh, “Tradition und wandel in der Persischen Musik des 19. Jahrhunderts”, in Musikkulturen Asiens Afrikas und Ozeaniens im 19. Jahrhundert, edited by Robert Günther. Regensburg: Gustav Bosse Verlag, 1973, pp. 73–94
- Mohammad Tagahi Massoudieh, und Josef Kuckertz. “Volksgesänge aus Iran”, in Beiträge zur Musik des Vorderen Orients und seinen Einflussbereichen. Kurt Reinhard zum 60. Geburstag, Baessler-Archiv, B. XXIII, 1975, pp. 217–229
- Mohammad Tagahi Massoudieh, “Die Musikforschung in Iran. Eine bibliographische übersicht”, Acta Musicologica, vol. XLVIII, Fasc. I, 1976, pp. 12–20
- Mohammad Tagahi Massoudieh, “Beziehungen Zwischen Persischen Volksmelodien und der Persischen Kunst-und Volksmusik” Rural/Urban Interchange in the Musics of South and West Asia, (International Musicological Society, Twelfth Congress, Held in Berkeley, on Aug 21–22, 1977), 1981, pp. 612–616
- Mohammad Tagahi Massoudieh, “Die Musikforschung in Iran. Eine Bibliographische übersicht (Fortsetzung)”, Acta Musicologica, vol. LII, Fasc. II, 1980, pp. 79–83
- Mohammad Tagahi Massoudieh, “Der Islam”, in Religiöse Autoritäten und Musik. Ein Symposium, edited by Dorothea Baumann and Kurt von Fischer, Kassel: Johannes Stauda Verlag, 1984, pp. 58–66
- Mohammad Tagahi Massoudieh, “Music of Būšehr”, in Encyclopaedia Iranica, edited by Ehsan Yarshater, vol. IV. Fasc 6, London and New York, 1990, p. 572
- Mohammad Tagahi Massoudieh, “Der Begriffe des Maqām in der Persischen Volksmusik” in Von der Vielfalt Musikalischer Kultur. Festschrift für Josef Kuckertz, edited by Rüdiger Schumacher, Anif/Salzburg, 1992, pp. 311–334
- Mohammad Tagahi Massoudieh, “Die Begriffe Maqām und Dastgāh in der Turkmennischen Musik des Iran” in Regional Maqām Traditionen in Geschichte Gegenwart. Teil 2. Materialien der Arabeitstagung der Study Grup Maqām des International Council for Traditional Music, edited by Jürgen Ensler and Gisa Jähnichen, Berlin, 1992, pp. 377–397
- Mohammad Tagahi Massoudieh, “Eqbāl Āḏar, Abu’l-Ḥasan Khan Qazvīnī”, in Encyclopaedia Iranica, edited by Ehsan Yarshater, vol. VIII. Fasc 5, London and New York, 1998, pp. 517–518
- Mohammad Tagahi Massoudieh, “Esmā`ilzāda”, in Encyclopaedia Iranica, edited by Ehsan Yarshater, vol. VIII. Fasc 6, London and New York, 1998, p. 637
- Mohammad Tagahi Massoudieh, "Melody change in the vocal line of Iranian traditional music" in the memoirs of Professor Mahmoud Karimi, Tehran, 1985.
- Mohammad Tagahi Massoudieh, "Polyphony in Iranian Music", Journal of the Faculty of Fine Arts, University of Tehran, Vol. 3, 1998, pp. 95–104.
- Mohammad Tagahi Massoudieh, "Taksim Bayati", Mahour Music Quarterly, Vol. 1, 1998, pp. 45–56.
- Mohammad Tagahi Massoudieh, "Oriental music and its soloists", Music Magazine, pp. 118 and 119, 1347, pp. 27–29.
- Sophia Lisa, "On the Essence of Musical Works", translated by Mohammad Tagahi Massoudieh, Music Magazine, No. 117, 1347, pp. 13–17.
- Sophia Lisa, "On the Essence of Musical Works (2)", translated by Mohammad Tagahi Massoudieh, Music Magazine, pp. 118 and 119, 1347, pp. 66–68.
- Yousef Cockertz, "Characteristics of Melody in Traditional Music of the Middle East, India and Southeast Asia", translated by Mohammad Tagahi Massoudieh, Faculty of Fine Arts, University of Tehran Press, No. 101, 1351.

== Students ==
Among Masoudiyeh's students, one can mention Mohammad Reza Darvishi, Abas Khoshdel, Hooman Asadi, Mohammad Haghgoo and Mohammad Mehdi Goorangi.

== Death ==
Mohammad Taghi Massoudieh died of cardiac arrest in Tehran on 1 February 1999, at the age of 71, while composing his last symphonic work. His body was buried in the presence of his students in Behesht-e Zahra artists' section.
