= Negar Bouban =

Iranian musician

Negar Bouban نگار بوبان

Background information
- Also known as: نگار بوبان, Negâr Boubân, Negar Buban, Negar Booban
- Born: 28 March 1973 (age 53); Tehran, Iran
- Genres: Persian traditional music
- Occupations: Composer, instrumentalist, vocalist, music teacher, author, music historian
- Instruments: oud, Barbat, vocals, santur
- Years active: 1994–present
- Website: www.negarbouban.com

Negar Bouban (Persian: نگار بوبان, also transliterated as Negâr Boubân or Negar Buban) (born Tehran, Iran, 1973) is an Iranian oud and barbat player and student of Mansour Nariman, best known for playing Iranian folk music and improvisational works.

Negar Bouban was a Fellow at Music OMI international residency 2012 in New York City and has also worked as a music teacher, music historian, and author. She is an assistant professor in the music department of the Islamic Azad University, Shiraz branch.

== Life ==
Bouban was born to parents from Kurdistan and grew up in Tehran. At age eight, she played the santur, but later took up the oud. She spent her high school years at Farzanegan High School in Tehran and graduated from the University of Tehran with a degree in architecture. While studying architecture at the university, she became interested in acoustics. She chose the design of acoustic halls for rehearsing and performing Iranian music and compiled a plan for the Tehran Conservatory of Music as the subject of her master's thesis. In 2009, Boban received a doctorate in art research from Al-Zahra University. Her doctoral dissertation, "The Common Foundation of Rhythm in Iranian Instrumental Music and Persian Language," supervised by Omid Tabibzadeh and advised by Hossein Alizadeh and Zahra Rahbarnia) is about the relationship between weight in the official Persian language and traditional music.

== Discography ==
- On Fire (2018)
- A Tale, Foretold (2016)
- Through (2012)
- Dar Gozar (2012)
- In Turn (2011)
- When There is More Beauty in the Contrary (2011)
- Be Hangam (2011)
- Fever (2011)
- Showqname (2010)
- Sarkhâne (2010)
- Continu (2008)
- Payaapey (2008)
- Charm of Tombak (2008)
- Az khiyal-e kopachinha-ye Alborz (2004)
- Shivang (2003)
- Goshayesh (2002)
