= Negin Zomorodi =

Negin Zomorodi نگین زمردی
- Born: April 22, 1973 (age 53)
- Origin: Tehran, Iran
- Genres: contemporary; classical; Persian traditional
- Occupations: pianist, composer
- Instrument: piano
- Years active: 2009–present
- Website: www.gozaracademy.com

Negin Zomorodi (Persian: نگین زمردی; also Romanized as "Negin Zomorrodi", Persian pronunciation: [neˈgiːn zomoɾɾoˈdiː]; born 22 April 1973 in Tehran) is an Iranian composer and pianist.

== Biography ==
Negin Zomorodi was born in 1973 in Tehran. She began playing the piano at childhood under the instruction of such renowned masters as Voski Ohanessian and Farimah Qavam-Sadri.

After graduating in textile engineering from Amirkabir University of Technology (AUT) in 1996, motivated by her love for music, she pursued music composition more seriously than before, which ultimately led to her entrance to Tehran University of Art, and she did an MA in music composition in 2009. Zomorodi also took specialized courses in music theory and harmony at The Royal Conservatory of Music (RCM) in Toronto, Canada and got up-to-date with these fields.

Since then her various works have been performed at festivals and concert halls, e.g. Roudaki Hall, including the piece "Shadow" for the flute and piano, performed at the Contemporary Composers Festival in Tehran; the string quartet "Suddenly", performed by the Iranian group "Chahargan"; the string quartet "Migration", performed by the group "Respina Quartet"; and the piece "Butterfly’s Dance", performed at the Contemporary Composers’ Piano Night.

In addition to composition, Zomorodi is skilled at improvisation, and at the Fereshteh Music Nights Festival one night was allotted to her improvisational playing.

"Specialized Meetings at Gozar Music Academy" were initiated by her in September 2010, aimed at keeping players, composers, masters, and researchers in touch, as well as upgrading the skills of Iranian students of art. Zomorodi has been both financially and spiritually the main supporter of these meetings, which are held monthly at Tehran Book Cities and Gozar Music Academy. Zomorodi taught music subjects to graduate and postgraduate students at Tehran University of Art and Islamic Azad University for some years. When Gozar Music Academy was founded in 2015, she took up its management.

== Works ==
- translating the book series Music by Me (Persian: موسیقی اثر من), written by Kevin Olson and Wynn-Anne Rossi, Tehran, 2015-16, 2 vols.,
- "Atom" musical piece, in the album Gush-e Panj (گوش پنج), Tehran, 2012
- String quartets in the album Ro'yā-ye Goriz (رؤیای گریز), Tehran, Farhangsarā-ye Arasbārān, 2013
- The sheet music book of her piano works of the album Masir-e Negāhat (مسیر نگاهت) have been published in the same name in 2014 in Tehran
- The album Kāshefān-e Forutan-e Fardā (کاشفان فروتن فردا), by Iranian contemporary composers, containing Negin Zomorodi's string quintet, Bedrud (بدرود), performed and recorded in Armenia, has been published in this album in 2016 in Tehran.
- Piano improvisations along with Persian classical instruments performances, have been published in the album Sarāb-o Hobāb in 2017 in Tehran.
- Her symphonic works in the album Darun Kuch (درون کوچ), performed by the Prague Metropolitan Orchestra, conducted by Barbod Bayat, recorded at the Prague Radio & TV studio, have been published in 2018 in Tehran
- Managing and performing at the Musighi-e Gozar Ensemble at the 4th International Mahak Conference, March 2017.
- "Sarāb-e ākhar" (a piece for piano, setar, and electronic instruments), has been published as the first track of the album These are Our Friends Too in September 2019 in London.

== Awards ==
- Best Composer Award, 27th Fajr International Music Festival, Tehran, 2011
