= Arshia Samsaminia =

- ارشیا صمصامی‌نیا
- Born: 1989 (age 36–37); Tehran, Iran
- Occupation: Composer

Arshia Samsaminia (Persian: ارشیا صمصامی‌نیا; born 1989 in Tehran) is an Iranian composer of contemporary music. His research and some of his compositions explore microtonal intervals and the application of historical Persian tuning theories to contemporary composition.

His works have been performed at festivals including the Huddersfield Contemporary Music Festival and Musica nova Helsinki. In 2022, he was the composer-in-residence at the fourth edition of the Klangteppich festival in Berlin.

== Early life and education ==
Samsaminia was born in Tehran in 1989. As a teenager, he played electric guitar and piano, and entered the Tehran Music School in 2004. His training on the setar introduced him to improvisation in Persian music. He subsequently began notating his improvisations and developing them into compositions.

He studied contemporary composition at institutions including the Sibelius Academy in Finland, the University of Gothenburg in Sweden, the Berlin University of the Arts, the Estonian Academy of Music and Theatre, and the Tbilisi State Conservatoire.

In 2020, Samsaminia began doctoral studies in composition at the Aristotle University of Thessaloniki. His research, supervised by Dimitri Papageorgiou and Caspar Johannes Walter, addresses the systematization of Persian musical intervals and tunings. In his account of the research, he identifies the application of Helmholtz–Ellis Just Intonation (HEJI) notation to composition based on Persian modes and tunings as its central focus.

== Career ==
In December 2016, a work by Samsaminia was included in a Nivak Ensemble programme at Rudaki Hall. The programme featured premieres of works by contemporary Iranian and Italian composers.

In 2016, his audiovisual work Railroading in the East was selected in MUSINFO's call for works.

In 2020, Darragh Morgan performed Beyond the Autonomous Sensory Meridian Response at the Huddersfield Contemporary Music Festival. The festival's official programme listed the performance as the work's world premiere.

On 10 January 2022, the German Ensemble Musikfabrik gave the world premiere of Micro-Moments IV in Cologne, with Yasamin Shahhosseini playing the oud. Composed in 2020 and commissioned by the ensemble, the work is scored for flute, violin, horn, percussion, oud, and prerecorded audio.

In an interview with Saba, Samsaminia described Micro-Moments as a cycle of eight pieces with different instrumental combinations, drawing on historical Persian modes and intervals.

In 2022, Samsaminia was the composer-in-residence at the fourth edition of the Klangteppich festival in Berlin and wrote a new work for Johannes Fink and Nikolaus Schlierf. The electroacoustic work FREQ.EXP was written for the festival's programme on 3 June at Theater Aufbau Kreuzberg. In the work, Fink plays double bass and cello, while Schlierf plays violin and viola; both performers switch instruments during the performance.

In 2023, Nodes and Arcs, for quarter-tone accordion and ensemble, received its premiere at Musica nova Helsinki, performed by Ensemble Zagros with Veli Kujala as soloist. The performance was also broadcast in February 2024 on Música viva, a programme on Spain's Radio Clásica.

In 2025, he served alongside Mehdi Jalali and Majid Tahriri on the jury for the student category of the ninth Reza Korourian Electroacoustic Composition Competition.

== Compositional approach ==
In an interview with VAN Outernational, Samsaminia explained that some of his compositions draw on the ratios, frequencies, and scales described in medieval musical treatises. He uses computer calculations to convert intervals discussed in the works of Al-Farabi, Avicenna, Safi al-Din al-Urmawi, and Qutb al-Din al-Shirazi into frequencies for use in his compositions.

In an essay published by Norient, he describes Helmholtz–Ellis notation as a means of precisely documenting intervals and enabling musicians from different musical backgrounds to perform them. The methods discussed in the essay include retuning string instruments, using harmonics, and providing electronic audio cues to help performers locate pitches.

In Micro-Moments VII, scored for three violas and three loudspeakers, he uses the modes Bozorg, Isfahan, and Busalik, based on calculations derived from Jami al-Alhan by Abd al-Qadir Maraghi. Samsaminia describes the aim of the Micro-Moments cycle as using historical intervals as material for contemporary composition, emphasizing that the works are not reconstructions of traditional Persian music.

== Awards and selections ==
Year	Event	Result
2024	Remus Georgescu International Composition Competition, Timișoara	One of five composers selected from 220 applicants.
2025	Fromm Foundation Composition Fellowship at the Composers Conference	Fellowship recipient.

== Selected works ==
The years in this table refer to performances or selections at the events listed. Composition dates, where known, are given in the notes column.

Year	Work	Notes
2016	Railroading in the East	Audiovisual work; selected in MUSINFO's 2016 call for works.
2020	Beyond the Autonomous Sensory Meridian Response	World premiere at the Huddersfield Contemporary Music Festival, performed by Darragh Morgan.
2022	Micro-Moments IV	Composed in 2020 for flute, violin, horn, percussion, oud, and prerecorded audio; premiered by Ensemble Musikfabrik in Cologne.
2022	FREQ.EXP	Electroacoustic work for two string players; performed at the Klangteppich festival in Berlin.
2023	Nodes and Arcs	For quarter-tone accordion and ensemble; premiered at Musica nova Helsinki by Veli Kujala and Ensemble Zagros.

== Recordings and releases ==
Excerpts from the performance of FREQ.EXP at the Klangteppich festival were released in January 2023 on the compilation Noise à Noise 23: Noise vs. Silence.

A live recording of Micro-Moments IV, from the January 2022 performance at KOMED in Cologne, was released by the Musikfabrik label in 2025.
