= Taghi Zarabi =

Iranian musician (born 1938)

Taghi Zarabi تقی ضرابی
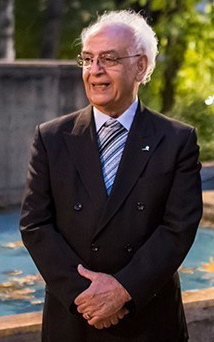

Background information
- Born: 1938 (age 87–88); Tehran, Iran
- Occupations: Musician, university professor, orchestra conductor, composer
- Instruments: Violin, piano, bassoon, bassoon, trumpet, trombone
- Formerly of: Tehran Symphony Orchestra

Taghi Zarabi (Persian: تقی ضرابی, born 1938) is a composer, conductor, university lecturer, and a member of the board of directors of the Iranian Music House. He is also the president of the Iranian Composers Association and the choir leaders of the Iranian Music House.

== Life and career ==
Taghi Zarabi was born in 1938 to a religious family in Tehran. Encouraged by his older brother, he entered the Conservatory of Music at the age of 15.

After entering the Conservatory of Music, he received a diploma in music with the rank of an excellent student.

After four years as a first bassoonist, he began his collaboration with the Tehran Symphony Orchestra under the direction of Heshmat Sanjari. He also won first place in the entrance exam to the Higher Conservatory of Music and was admitted to the composition and conducting departments. He benefited from the training of artists such as Yousef Yousefzadeh, Mostafa Kasravi, Houshang Ostavar, Hassan Radmard, Heshmat Sanjari, and Hossein Nasehi, as well as the "Cadets" from Germany.

In 1964, for the orchestra conducting project, he performed the overture to Giuseppe Verdi's opera The Force of Destiny with the Tehran Symphony Orchestra at the Farhang Hall. During this period he also graduated from the Higher Conservatory of Music with first place.

He entered the Officers' College and joined the Immortal Guard. In 1978, he went to the Royal Marine College of Music in England to continue his studies and take additional courses in orchestra conducting. After receiving a Bandmaster's degree and performing several concerts in England, he entered the Royal Academy of Music, where he obtained a conductor's degree (music).

He has been the conductor of the Tehran Youth Symphony Orchestra.

On December 2, 2018, at the ceremony of the fourth "Year of Iranian Music", Zarabi was honored and presented with the "Year of Music" statue and a plaque of appreciation.

== Teaching ==
Zarabi has been teaching in cultural centers since 1980. He teaches instrumental music, conducting classical music orchestras, and playing the bassoon at the Boys' and Girls' Music Conservatory. He teaches orchestration, harmony, bassoon, and conducting at the University of Applied Sciences, the Faculty of Music at the University of Arts, and Soure University. He is also currently the director of the Military Music Group, and the deputy director of education and research at the Faculty of Music at the University of Arts.
