= Symphonic music in Iran =

Symphonic music in Iran encompasses Iranian musical pieces composed in the symphonic style. In addition to instrumental compositions, some of Iran's symphonic pieces are based on the country's folk songs, and some are based on poetry of both classical and contemporary Iranian poets.

== History ==
Iran's Society for National Music was founded by Khaleqi in 1949.

Ali-Naqi Vaziri, one of the most prominent and influential musicians of the late Qajar and early Pahlavi periods, established a private music school in 1924, where he also created a school orchestra composed of his students, formed by a combination of the Iranian instrument of tar and some western instruments. Vaziri then founded an association named Music Club (Kolub-e Musiqi), formed by a number of progressive-minded writers and scholars, where the school orchestra performed concerts that were conducted by himself. The Tehran Symphony Orchestra (Orkestr-e Samfoni-ye Tehrān) was founded by Gholamhossein Minbashian in 1933. It was reformed by Parviz Mahmoud in 1946, and is currently the oldest and largest symphony orchestra in Iran. Later, Ruhollah Khaleqi, a student of Vaziri, established the Society for National Music (Anjoman-e Musiqi-ye Melli) in 1949. He wrote his musical compositions within the parameters of classical Iranian modes, some of which involved Western triadic harmony. Many of Iran's folk songs have the potential of being adapted into major or minor tonalities, and therefore, a number of Iranian folk songs were arranged for orchestral accompaniment.

Symphonische Dichtungen aus Persien ("Symphonic Poems from Persia"), a collection of Persian symphonic works, was performed by the German Nuremberg Symphony Orchestra and conducted by Iranian conductor Ali Rahbari in 1980.

Loris Tjeknavorian, a celebrated Iranian Armenian composer and conductor, composed Rostam and Sohrab, an opera with Persian libretto that is based on the tragedy of Rostam and Sohrab from prominent medieval Persian poet Ferdowsi's epic poem Šāhnāme, in over two decades. It was first performed by the Tehran Symphony Orchestra at Tehran's Roudaki Hall in December 2003.

In the 21st century, contemporary Iranian symphonic music has increasingly intersected with European avant-garde and Iranian school traditions. Among the prominent composers actively creating and performing orchestral works within this realm are Alireza Mashayekhi, Mehdi Hosseini, Reza Vali, and Behzad Ranjbaran. In particular, Mehdi Hosseini has emerged as a key figure in this movement, utilizing extensive ethnomusicological research into regional Iranian folk music as a structural framework for his pieces.

== List of composers ==
The following are a number of Iranian composers of symphonic music.

- Ahmad Pejman
- Ali Rahbari
- Alireza Mashayekhi
- André Hossein
- Behzad Ranjbaran
- Fouzieh Majd
- Heshmat Sanjari
- Hormoz Farhat
- Hossein Alizâdeh
- Hossein Dehlavi
- Houshang Ostovar
- Loris Tjeknavorian
- Majid Entezami
- Mehdi Hosseini
- Mohammad Reza Tafazzoli
- Morteza Hannaneh
- Nader Mashayekhi
- Reza Vali
- Samin Baghtcheban
- Shahrdad Rouhani

== See also ==
- Music of Iran
- List of Iranian musicians
