= Ostovar =

Ostovar may refer to:

- Ostovar, a ranking in the Iranian military
- Houshang Ostovar or Hoochang Ostovar (1927–2016), Persian symphonic music composer and instructor
