= Zarabi =

Zarabi is a surname. Notable people with the surname include:

- Moluk Zarabi (born 1907), Singer and actress.
- Taghi Zarabi (born 1938), Musician, composer
- Abderraouf Zarabi (born 1979), Algerian footballer
- Kheireddine Zarabi (born 1984), Algerian footballer, brother of Abderraouf
