= Rouben Gregorian =

Iranian-Armenian composer, conductor, and violinist (1915–1991)

Ruben Gregorian
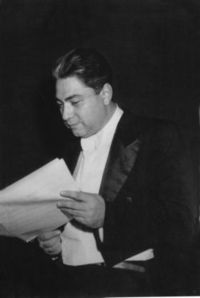

Background information
- Born: 1915; Tbilisi, Russian Empire
- Died: 28 March 1991 (aged 76) Boston, Massachusetts, US
- Occupations: Composer, musician
- Instrument: Violin

Ruben Gregorian (Armenian: Ռուբէն Գրիգորեան) (born 1915 in Tbilisi; died 28 March 1991 in Boston, Massachusetts) was an Iranian-Armenian composer, conductor, musician, and violinist. He was the former conductor of the Tehran Symphony Orchestra and one of the pioneers of recording local Iranian songs.

== Biography ==
Ruben Gregorian was born in 1915 in Tbilisi, the capital of Georgia, to an Armenian family. Rubik had two younger brothers, who also loved music and knew that one of them, Henry, was one of the great musicians of the 100-strong New York Symphony Orchestra. His family migrated to Tabriz after a while.

Reuben and his brother Henry first learned the basics of music from their parents, who played the violin and piano. Ruben was sent to Paris in the late 1920s before the age of 18 to complete his art. He received his art education in Paris. Gregorian moved to Tehran in the early 1930s. After arriving in Iran, he taught composition and violin And was elected as the choir leader of the Conservatory of Music. The first Persian language choir in Iran was founded by Rubik Grigorian at the Conservatory of Music. Then he worked as Parviz Mahmoud's deputy in the conservatory, which lasted for two years. One of his great and valuable works is collecting local songs from remote parts of Iran.

He entered the country's music department in 1938 and wrote articles in "Music" magazine. In addition to playing and teaching, he was the conductor of the Symphony Orchestra and the sponsor of the country's music department. He then went to the United States, where he performed for the Boston Symphony Orchestra and worked there for many years.

After Parviz Mahmoud emigrated to the United States in 1950, Rubik Grigorian became the conductor of the Tehran Symphony Orchestra and was given the responsibility of running the Conservatory of Music. He had a short trip to Iran in 1976 and 1977 and taught at the University of Tehran.

On 19 April 2012, a commemoration ceremony for Rubik (Ruben) Grigorian was held in Tehran.

== Works ==
Gregorian composed music on Iranian themes and composed many songs with piano, Oriental fantasy, string quartet, scherzo for piano and several orchestral pieces. His style of composition was that of the school of Russian musicians with Rimsky-Korsakov. He not only harmonized local Iranian songs, but perhaps it can be said that he also "Armenianized" them! Thus, the culmination of his work in arranging and orchestrating Armenian themes should be sought. Another of his works is "Iranian Suite", which was a memento of her first trip to Iran in 1976.

The first volume of "Rural Songs of Iran" with Rubik's trilingual introduction in Persian, French, Armenian and Ashut Minasian's notation was published by the "Association for the Development of Armenian Youth Thought" in 1948. The second volume was published in 1949 with the personal capital of the author.
