= Mahmud Mahmud =

Iranian politician and historian (1882–1965)

Mahmud Mahmud محمود محمود
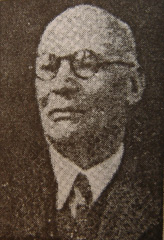

Governor of Tehran
- Deputy: Ahmad Qavam

Member of Parliament of Iran
- Constituency: Najafabad

Personal details
- Born: 1882 Tabriz, Qajar Iran
- Died: 1965 (aged 82–83) Tehran, Pahlavi Iran
- Party: Democrat Party of Iran (1940s); Socialist Party (1920s); Democrat Party (1910s)
- Children: Parviz Mahmoud

Mahmud Mahmud (Persian: محمود محمود; 1882–1965) was an Iranian politician and historian. He served as Governor of Tehran, Member of Parliament, and Minister of Post and Telegraph.

He also was active academically. He wrote many articles and books, and also translated Machiavelli's "Principe" into Persian. His most extensive work was a volume series titled The Political Relations of Iran and Britain in the 19th Century.

He died a blind man at the age of 83 in Tehran.

== See also ==
- Pahlavi dynasty
- List of prime ministers of Iran

== References used ==
The following reference was used for the above writing: 'Alí Rizā Awsatí. (2003). Iran in the Past Three Centuries (Irān dar Se Qarn-e Goz̲ashteh, Volumes 1 and 2 (Paktāb Publishing, Tehran). ISBN 964-93406-6-1 (Vol. 1), ISBN 964-93406-5-3 (Vol. 2).
