= Alexander Rahbari =

Iranian composer and conductor (born 1948)

Alexander Rahbari علی رهبری
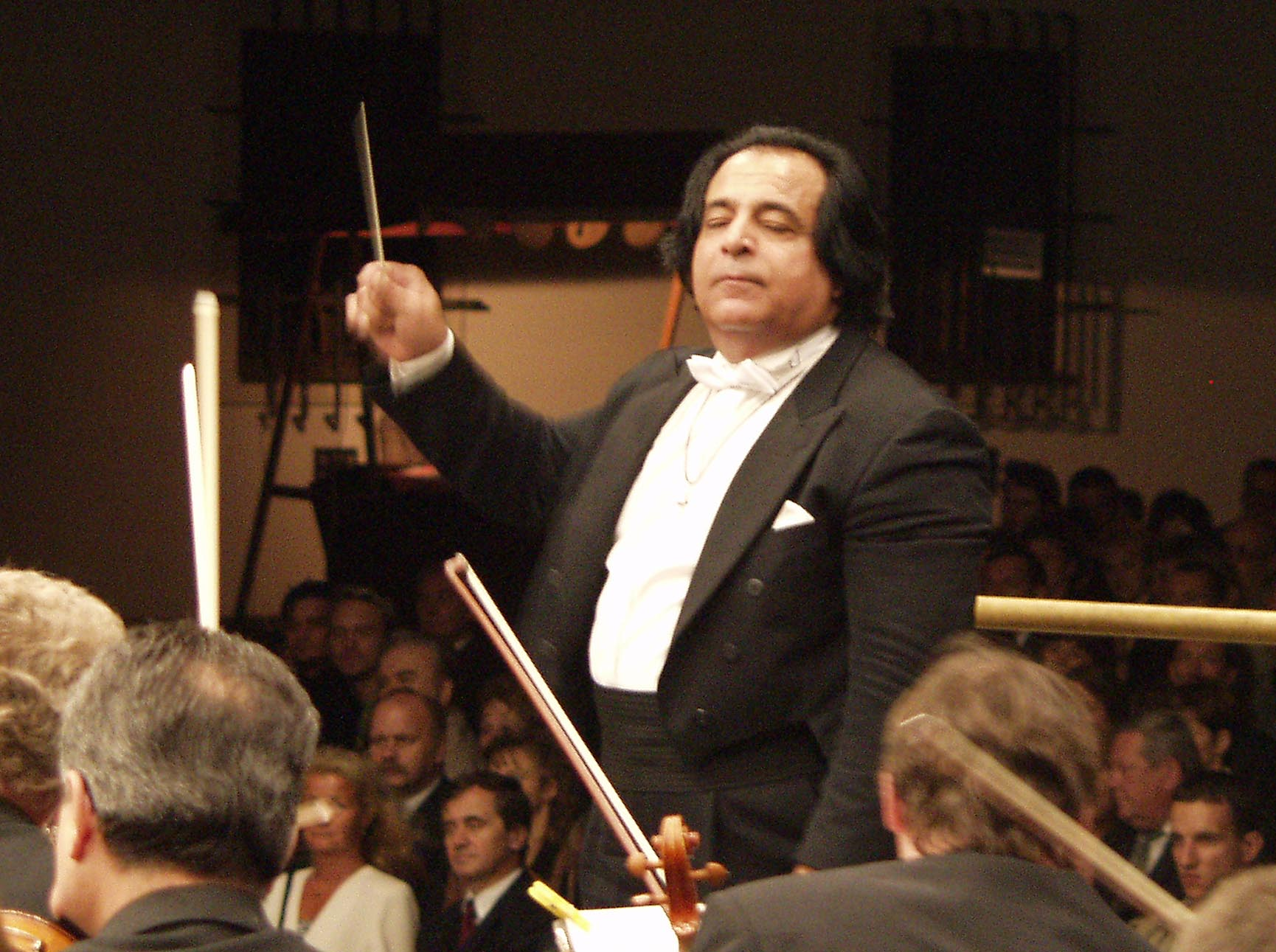
- Ali (Alexander) Rahbari at Špilberk Festival in Brno, Czech Republic, 2002

Background information
- Born: 26 May 1948 (age 78); Tehran, Imperial State of Iran
- Genres: Classical music, Persian symphonic music
- Occupations: Conductor, composer
- Instrument: Violin

Ali (Alexander) Rahbari (Persian: علی (الکساندر) رهبری; also Romanized as "Alī Rahbarī", Persian pronunciation: [æˈliː ɾæhbæˈɾiː]; born 1948) is an Iranian composer and conductor who has worked with more than 120 European orchestras, including the Berlin Philharmonic and the Mariinsky Opera.

== Life ==
Born in Tehran on 26 May 1948, Rahbari studied violin and composition with Rahmatollah Badiee and Hossein Dehlavi at the Persian National Music Conservatory. From the age of 17 he was a violinist at the Fine Arts Administration Orchestra No. 1 (conducted by Hossein Dehlavi). After receiving his violin diploma from the National Conservatory, he won a scholarship from the Iran Ministry of Culture and Art and moved to Austria. Rahabari continued his studies in composition and conducting at the Vienna Academy with Gottfried von Einem, Hans Swarovsky and Karl Österreicher.

Some months after his return to Iran, in 1973 he became director of the Persian National Music Conservatory and was director of the Tehran Conservatory of Music from 1974 to 1977.

During this time Rahbari, in co-operation with young Iranian musicians, established Iran's Jeunesse Musicale Orchestra where he was its music director and permanent conductor. He also conducted the Tehran Symphony Orchestra, the National Iranian Radio and Television (NIRT) Chamber Orchestra, and the Tehran Opera Orchestra as a guest conductor in Roudaki Hall.

In 1977 he emigrated to Europe. In the same year he won the first prize of the International Besançon Competition for Young Conductors (France) and in 1978 received the silver medal at the Geneva International Conducting Competition. In this year he recorded three LPs entitled "Symphonische Dichtungen aus Persien" [Symphonic Poems from Persia] with the Nürnberg Symphony Orchestra in Germany, including 6 works by some of the greatest 20th century Iranian composers: "Bijan & Manijeh" by Hossein Dehlavi, "Dance", "Ballet-Immpressionen" and "Rhapsodie" by Ahmad Pejman, "Sheherazade" by Aminollah (Andre) Hossein, "Iranian Suite" by Houshang Ostovar, "Persian Mysticism in G" (his own composition) and "Mouvement Symphonic" by Mohammad-Taghi Massoudieh.

1979 was the most important year in Rahbari's career. He was invited to conduct the Berlin Philharmonic Orchestra and in 1980 Salzburg Easter Festival became Karajan's assistant.

From 1988 to 1996, Rahbari was the principal conductor of the Flemish Radio Orchestra (now Brussels Philharmonic), and after that became music director of the Zagreb Philharmonic Orchestra.
In 2005 he came back to Iran, and conducted Beethoven's Ninth Symphony in Tehran. Many conservatives and newspapers accused Rahbari of promoting Western values. He resigned from the Tehran Symphony Orchestra and left Iran as a protest against its music industry .
In 2009 he introduced new musical ideas based on rhythms in Persian traditional music.

In 2022, following the Russian invasion of Ukraine, Rahbari spoke out against the international sanctions against Russian musicians. Rahbari believed that the worst thing an artist can do is sanction another artist. "If the sanction is correct, then we should have sanctioned many British, American and basically NATO who have attacked villages in Afghanistan and attacked Baghdad for no reason since the last 45 years. They had no border and no problem with them. So, in this way, we should have banned all Hollywood films", he said.

== Selected compositions ==
- Violin Concerto / Symphonie Persane Nohe Khan (1967/72)
- Persian Mysticism -around G-, for orchestra (1969)
- Beirut, for flutes ensemble (1985)
- Music For Human Rights, for orchestra (1980s)
- Puccini: Tosca - Czecho-Slovak Radio Symphony Orchestra (Bratislava) and Slovak Philharmonic Chorus [April 1990]
- EXTA$Y The Musical (dedicated to Giacomo Puccini) (1995/96)
  - Part 1 : Sister Angelica
  - Part 2 : Mister Gianni
- La Fuerza Flamenca, for Choir and Orchestra (2000)
- My Mother Persia, 7 Symphonic Poems (2017/18)
- Zarathustra Spitama, for orchestra and tenor premier concert with Zagreb philharmonic orchestra with Iranian opera singer Reza Fekri (2022) and two times in Marinsky theater with Reza Fekri

- My Mother Persia, 7 Symphonic Poems (2017/18)
- Morshed, Tenor: Reza Fekri and published on Naxos

== See also ==
- Music of Iran
- List of Iranian composers
- Persian Symphonic Music
