= Reza Vali =

Iranian musician and composer (born 1952)

Reza Vali (Persian: رضا والی) is an Iranian musician and composer.

== Life and education ==
Vali was born in Qazvin in 1952 and studied at the Tehran Conservatory.

In 1972, he began attending the University of Music and Performing Arts Vienna. He later attended the University of Pittsburgh where he received his PhD in composition and music theory.

== Career ==
Vali has received the Austrian Ministry of Arts and Sciences honor prize and two Andrew W. Mellon fellowships. He was selected by the Pittsburgh Cultural Trust as an Outstanding Emerging Artist, for which he received the Creative Achievement Award.

Vali's orchestral works have been performed by the Pittsburgh Symphony Orchestra, the Seattle Symphony, the Boston Modern Orchestra Project, the Baltimore Symphony Orchestra, the Memphis Symphony Orchestra, and Orchestra 2001. He has been commissioned by the Pittsburgh Symphony Orchestra, the Boston Modern Orchestra Project, the Pittsburgh New Music Ensemble, the Kronos Quartet, the Seattle Chamber Players, and the Arizona Friends of Chamber Music, as well as receiving grants from the Pennsylvania Council on the Arts and the Pittsburgh Board of Public Education. His chamber music has been performed by the Cuarteto Latinoamericano, the Del Sol Quartet, the Pittsburgh New Music Ensemble, the Kronos Quartet, the Seattle Chamber Players, and the Da Capo Chamber Players.

He is a professor emeritus at Carnegie Mellon University, where he has been on the faculty since 1988.

== Works ==
=== Folk Songs series ===
- Folk Songs Set No. 1, for soprano and piano (1979)
- Folk Songs Set No. 2, for soprano and piano (1981)
- Folk Songs Set No. 5, for soprano, choir, harp, piano and percussion (1984)
- Folk Songs Set No. 7, for voice and chamber orchestra (1986)
- Folk Songs Set No. 8, for voice and ensemble (1989)
- Folk Songs Set No. 9, for flute and cello (1991)
- Folk Songs Set No. 10, for soprano and chamber orchestra (1993)
- Folk Songs Set No. 11A, for four cellos (1995)
- Folk Songs Set No. 11B, for string quartet (1995)
- Folk Songs Set No. 12, for soprano, string quartet and piano (1996)
- Folk Songs Set No. 13, for four cellos (1996)
- Folk Songs Set No. 14, for soprano and chamber orchestra (1998)
- Folk Songs Set No. 15, for flute, clarinet, percussion, violin and cello (1999)
- Folk Songs Set No. 16 The Being of Love, for soprano and orchestra (2005)
- Folk Songs Set No. 17 Sornâ, for clarinet and ensemble (2015)

=== Calligraphy series ===
- Calligraphy No. 1, for string quartet (1999)
- Calligraphy No. 2 Zand, for string quartet (1999)
- Calligraphy No. 3, for string quartet (1999)
- Calligraphy No. 4, for Persian santur and string quartet (2001)
- Calligraphy No. 5, for violin or viola (2003)
- Calligraphy No. 6, for string quartet (2006)
- Calligraphy No. 7 Kismet, for three flutes (2007)
- Calligraphy No. 8 Kereshmeh, for six woodwinds and percussion (2007)
- Calligraphy No. 9 Kord, for solo cello (2008)
- Calligraphy No. 10 Khojasteh, for violin and cello (2010)
- Calligraphy No. 11 Gâtâr, for string quartet (2011)
- Calligraphy No. 12 Geryân, for string quartet (2011)
- Calligraphy No. 13 The Ancient Call, for orchestra (2014)
- Calligraphy No. 14, for Persian santur and string quartet (2014)
- Calligraphy No. 15 Raak, for string quartet (2015)
- Calligraphy No. 16 Isfahan, for orchestra (2017)

=== Orchestral ===
- Deylámân (1995)
- Ravân (2013)

=== Concertante ===
- Four Movements for String Quartet and Orchestra (1993)
- The Dervish and the Magus, for cello and chamber orchestra
- Flute Concerto (1997)
- Concerto for Persian Ney and Orchestra Toward That Endless Plain (2003)
- Double Concerto for Persian Ney, Kamanche, and Orchestra Segâh (2010)

=== Chamber ===
- String Quartet No. 1
- String Quartet No. 2 (1991)
- String Quartet No. 3 (2001)
- Love Songs, for piano quartet (2003)
- String Quartet No. 4 Ormavi (2017)

== Recordings ==
- 2024: ESFAHÂN (Navona Records)
- 2019: Longing: Chamber Music of Reza Vali (MSR Classics)
- 2018: The Ancient Call (Albany Records)
- 2015: The Book of Calligraphy (Albany Records)
- 2013: Reza Vali: Towards that Endless Plain (Boston Modern Orchestra Project)
- 2006: Chant and Dance: Works for Chamber Ensemble (Albany Records)
- 2005: Calligraphies: Works for String Quartet (Albany Records)
- 1995: Persian Folklore (New Albion)

== See also ==
- Symphonic music in Iran
