= Symphonische Dichtungen aus Persien =

1980 studio music album

Studio album by Hossein Dehlavi, Houshang Ostovar, Aminollah Hossein, Ali Rahbari, Mohammad Taghi Masoudieh, Ahmad Pejman
- Released: 1980
- Genre: Persian Symphonic Music
- Length: 2 Hours
- Label: Colosseum / Nuremberg Symphony Orchestra
- Producers: Ministry of Culture and Art

Symphonische Dichtungen aus Persien (Symphonic Poems from Persia) is a series of 3 gramophone records recorded with Nuremberg Symphony Orchestra in 1980 conducted by Ali Rahbari. Including works of the Persian (Iranian) contemporary composers:

- Hossein Dehlavi – Suite of Bijan & Manijeh (Based on National Epic of Persia Ferdowsi's 'Shahnameh')
- Aminollah Hossein – Shahrzad
- Mohammad Taghi Massoudieh – Movement Symphonic
- Houshang Ostovar – Iranian Suite
- Ahmad Pejman – Dance, Rhapsodie, Ballete
- Ali Rahbari – Persian Mystic on G

The records were released as a compact disc by Colosseum Company in Germany in 2005.
