= Seattle Chamber Players =

American chamber ensemble

The Seattle Chamber Players are a chamber ensemble focused on contemporary music, founded in 1989 in Seattle, Washington, U.S. In January 2004, the group was awarded the ASCAP/Chamber Music America Award for Adventurous Programming.

As of 2005, the core members are Laura DeLuca (clarinet), David Sabee (cello), Mikhail Shmidt (violin), and Paul Taub (flute). DeLuca, Sabee, and Schmidt are members of the Seattle Symphony (SSO); Shmidt is also a former member of the Moscow State Symphony; Taub is a professor of music at Cornish College of the Arts. Other players are brought into the orchestra for specific performances. For example, a series of performances of Ástor Piazzolla's tango opera during the 2004–2006 season featured Uruguayan pianist and conductor Pablo Zinger, Russian bandoneonist Alexander Mitenev, Venezuelan tenor Leonardo Granadas, Argentine tango vocalist Katie Viquiera, Slovene accordionist Borut Zagoranski, and Welsh guitarist Michael Partington.

Russian musicologist Elena Dubinets, music research coordinator for the SSO, joined the ensemble in 2002 as artistic advisor, and has been largely responsible for transforming them from a local to an international institution, hosting international festivals such as Icebreaker I: Voices from New Russia (2004) and Icebreaker II: Baltic Voices (2004); the planned Icebreaker III (2006) will feature music from the countries of the Caucasus. They have travelled twice to Eastern Europe, scoring critical successes in Moscow, St. Petersburg, and Tallinn, and are scheduled to tour Costa Rica, El Salvador, and Ecuador in spring 2005.

== Recordings ==
- Otis Spann: Music of Wayne Horvitz (Periplum)
- Reza Vali's Folksongs (Set No. 15) (release expected 2005)
