= Bardia Sadrenoori =

Iranian Pianist

Bardia Sadrenoori بردیا صدرنوری
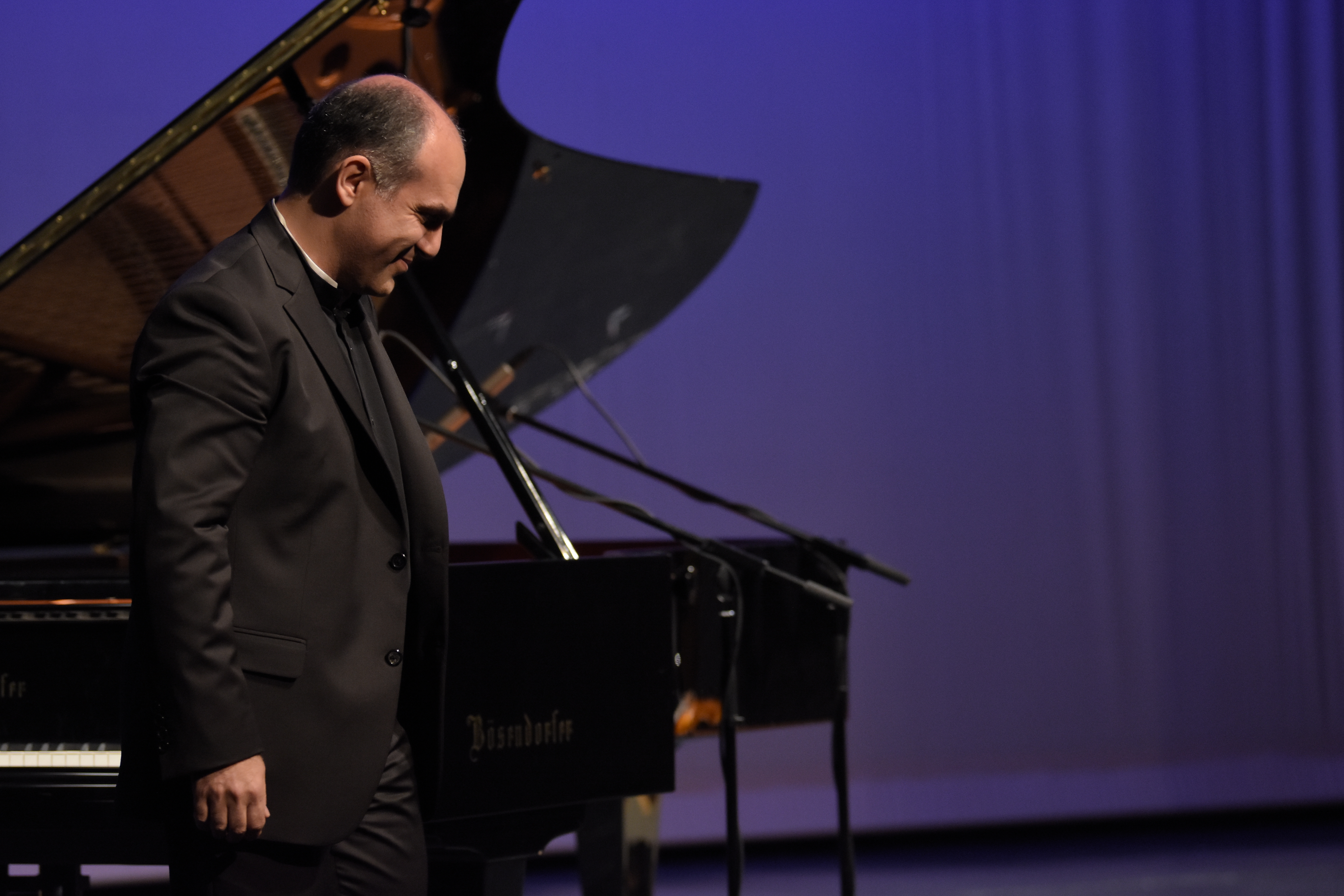
- Bardia Sadrenoori at Roudaki Hall Tehran 2018

Background information
- Born: Bardia Sadrenoori; 2 May 1968 (age 58); Rasht
- Genres: Classical, Persian traditional music
- Occupation: Classical pianist
- Instrument: Piano
- Years active: 1987–present
- Website: radnoandish.com

Bardia Sadrenoori (Persian: بردیا صدرنوری, romanized: Bārdiâ Sādr–e–nouryi; born 2 May 1968), also spelled Bardia Sadr-e-noori, is an Iranian pianist, chamber musician, music improvisator and author. His style is classical Persian piano as musical improvisator. he has a lot of experience performing and collaborating with other musicians and artists. In France, he performed for the first time with a non-equal-tempered piano in January 2022 in Rennes. In Iran, he is the founder and director of Radnoandish cultural and artistic institute, as well as organizer of festivals of art and concerts.

== Biography ==
Bardia Sadrenoori was born in 1968 in Rasht, Iran, he began his piano at the age of 10. He started playing classical piano by the supervision of "Fahim Momtazi". Since early ages, he accepted genre of piano playing close to Classical music, nonetheless his tendency started to be curiosity on his favorite genre of playing piano as Persian traditional music. Therefore, he had introduced to "Kiomars Parsay" to take a humble advantage of learning Persian traditional music. Mehr News Agency described him as "an artist of exceptional promises."

== Education ==
Sadrenoori attended at Amirkabir University of Technology in Tehran in MSc of Industrial Engineering whereas by next few following year of his graduation meanwhile, he was recording his debut album he decided to pursue his career as finally and signature of his education in PhD of Strategic Management as well as afterwards he published his own Blueprint on promoting classical music of each nation by publishing his master work on book "strategic study for national music."

== Career ==
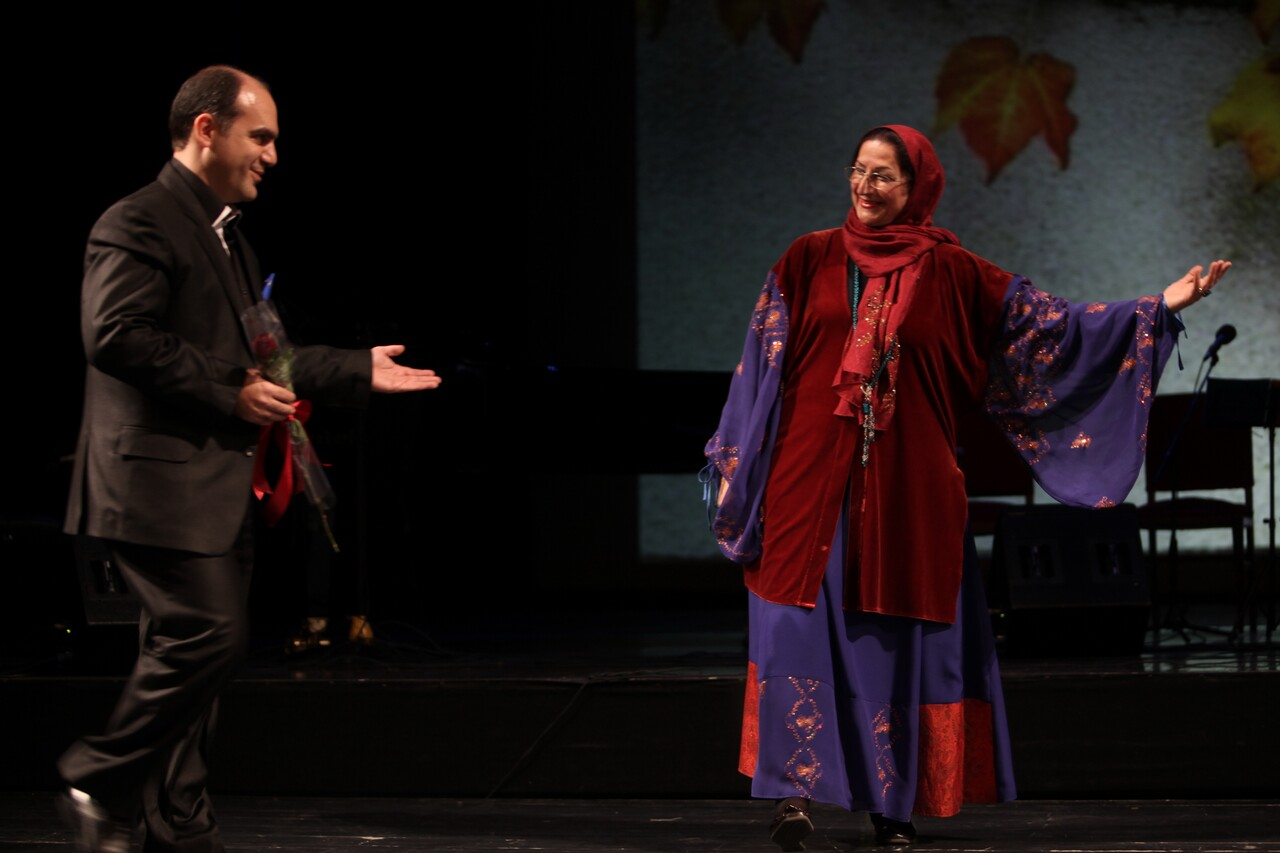
Pari maleki and Bardia-Sadrenoori at 20 years of Khonya at Roudaki Hall

Since 1987 Sadrenoori is particularly committed to classical music tendency to Iranian traditional songs. He started as soloist in several premiere of his performances even though, this was start for Sadrenoori to experience both playing chamber music and duet which has augmented technicality skills in his playing as well as both musical and social skills that differed Sadrenoori from skills he has for playing solo or symphonic works. Bardia Sadrenoori founded and established his own chamber music group called"Mehr avar"(Persian: گروه موسیقس مهرآور).

== Performances ==
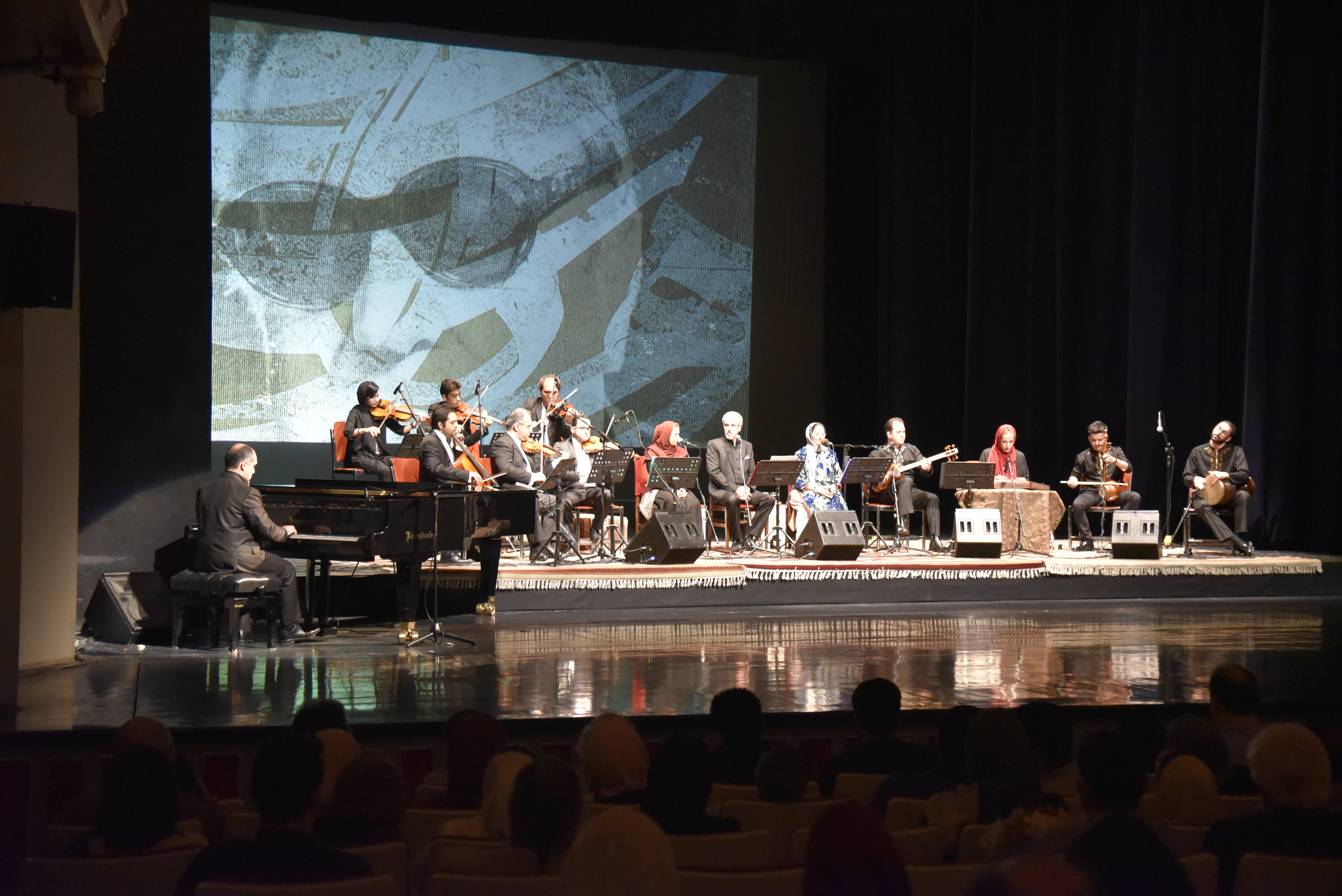
Bardia Sadrenoori (piano) and KHONYA Musical Group performing Persian Classical Chamber Ensemble at Roudaki Hall

His works in classical piano playing had become a limelight in eyes of the major Iranian musicians, composers, artists and singers which led him to an honorable invitation for collaborating in chamber music performing such as duetsand music ensembles during his young ages, for instance he contributed with:

- "KHONYA Musical Group" under directorship of Pari Maleki
- "Simurgh Classical chamber ensembles" under directorship of Afshin Qarshi
- Mehr National Orchestra under directorship of Nasser Izadi
- Piano duo in collaboration with Sepas Sadrenoori

=== Classical chamber musical ensemble ===
Number of musician	Name	Instrumentation	Year	Theme	Musical group	Leader	Vocal	Piano	Place	Concert producer
9	Nonet	Piano, kamancheh, percussion instrument, Tar, Tonbak, Bam-Tar, Daf, Santur,	2005	Tehran 1330	KHONYA Musical Group	Pari Maleki	Pari Maleki	Bardia Sadrenoori	Roudaki Hall Tehran	Radnoandish Art and Cultural Institute
8	Octet	Piano, kamancheh, percussion instrument, Tar, Bam-Tar, Daf, Santur, Bam-Tar, Tonbak,	2007	Persian Music & Spring Melodies	KHONYA Musical Group	Pari Maleki	Pari Maleki	Bardia Sadrenoori	Roudaki Hall Tehran	Radnoandish Art and Cultural Institute
8	Octet	Piano, kamancheh, percussion instrument, Tar, Bam-Tar, Daf, Bam-Tar, Tonbak,	2010	10 Years Review of KHONYA	KHONYA Musical Group	Pari Maleki	Pari Maleki	Bardia Sadrenoori	Niavaran Complex Tehran	Radnoandish Art and Cultural Institute
4	Quartet	Piano, cello, percussion instrument, Guitar	2011	Those Days	KHONYA Musical Group	Pari Maleki	Pari Maleki	Bardia Sadrenoori	Roudaki Hall Tehran	Radnoandish Art and Cultural Institute
8	Octet	Tar, Oud, kamancheh, Daf, Udu, Goblet drum, Bendir, Cajón, Ney, Santur, Tonbak, Bongos, Dhol	2012	Since, I Love You	KHONYA Musical Group	Pari Maleki	Pari Maleki	Bardia Sadrenoori	Roudaki Hall Tehran	Radnoandish Art and Cultural Institute
5	Quintet	Tar, kamancheh, Tonbak, Bam-tar	2013	Khoram's Night	KHONYA Musical Group	Pari Maleki	Pari Maleki	Bardia Sadrenoori	Roudaki Hall Tehran	Radnoandish Art and Cultural Institute
9	Nonet	Bam-tar, Tar, kamancheh, Dhol, Dayereh, Daf, Udu, Tonbak, Ney, Santur, Harmonica	2013	20 Years of KHONYA	KHONYA Musical Group	Pari Maleki	Pari Maleki	Bardia Sadrenoori	Roudaki Hall Tehran	Radnoandish Art and Cultural Institute

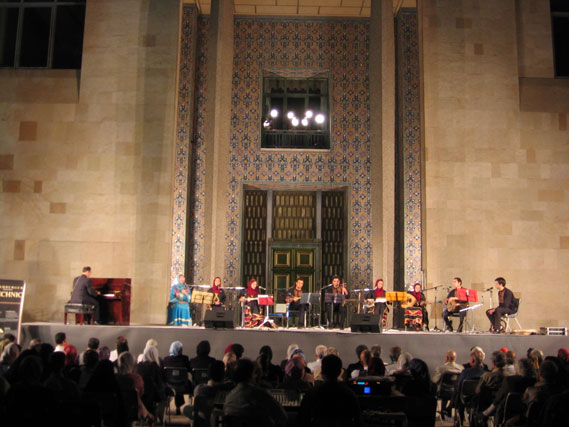
Pari maleki (KHONYA Musical Group), Bardia Sadrenoori (Piano) on Chamber Musical Ensemble 10 Years of KHONYA Concert" performance at Niavaran Complex, 2010

=== Classical musical ensemble ===
"Mehr National Orchestra" under leadership of Naser Izadi. ."

Number of musicians	Name Orchestral	Instrumentation	Year	Theme	Orchestra Late Romantic	Leader	Vocal	Piano	Place	Concert Producer
25	Late Romantic orchestra	Strings Violin, viola, Cello, Tar; Woodwinds Flute, Clarinet, Duduk; Keyboards Piano; Percussion Daf	2012	Salute, Rain	Mehr National Orchestra	Nasser Izadi	Hussein Mozafari	Bardia Sadrenoori	Roudaki Hall Tehran	Radnoandish Art and Cultural Institute
24	Late Romantic orchestra	Strings Violin, viola, Cello, Tar; Woodwinds Flute, Clarinet; Keyboards Piano; Percussion Daf	2014	Autumnal	Mehr National Orchestra	Nasser Izadi	Amir Assna Ashari	Bardia Sadrenoori	Roudaki Hall Tehran	Radnoandish Art and Cultural Institute
22	Late Romantic orchestra	Strings Violin, viola, Cello, Tar, Double bass, Bam-tar; Woodwinds Flute, Clarinet; Keyboards Piano; Percussion Daf, Tonbak, percussion instrument	2016	Homayoun Khorram's Lapse	Mehr National Orchestra	Nasser Izadi	Vahid Taj	Bardia Sadrenoori	Roudaki Hall Tehran	Radnoandish Art and Cultural Institute
15	Late Romantic orchestra	Strings Violin, viola, Cello, Tar; Woodwinds Flute, Clarinet; Keyboards Piano; Percussion percussion instrument	2006	Iranian Traditional Music & Gilan Folk Music	Mehra-Ava Musical Group	Bardia Sadrenoori	Hussein Mozafari	Bardia Sadrenoori	Roudaki Hall Tehran	Radnoandish Art and Cultural Institute

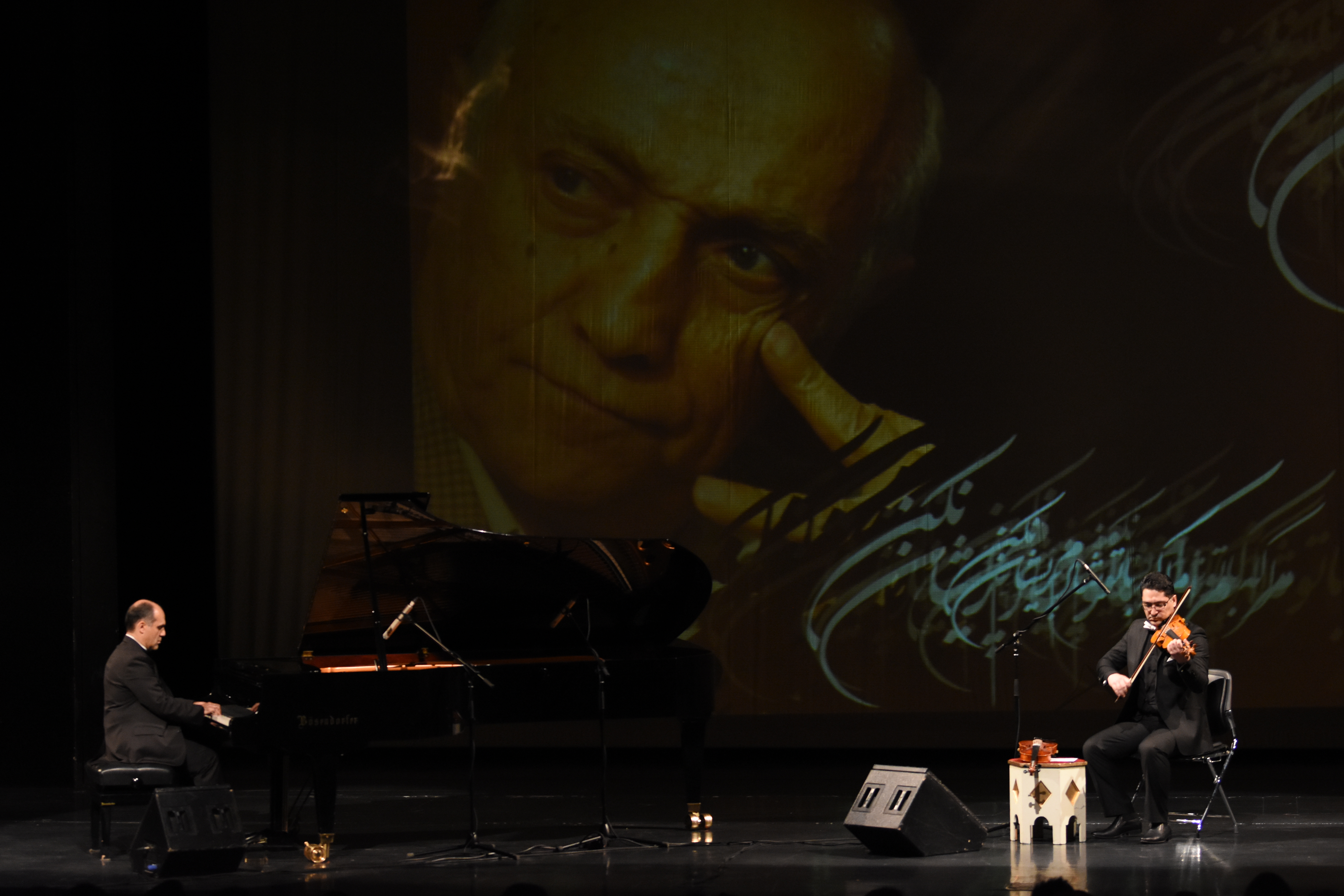
Bardia Sadrenoori (Piano), Babak Shahraki (Violin) " Homayoun Khorrams Music Hymns at Roudaki Hall 2018

=== Instrumental Musical ensemble ===
Number of Musician	Name	Instrumentation	Year	Theme	2nd Performer	Place	Concert Producer
2	Piano duo	Piano	2017	Friend's Chant	Sepas Sadrenoori	Roudaki Hall Tehran	Radnoandish Art and Cultural Institute
2	Duet	Piano, Violin	2018	Homayoun Khorram Music Hymns Concert	Babak shahraki	Roudaki Hall Tehran	Radnoandish Art and Cultural Institute
2	Duet	Piano, Violin	2018	Rah-e-Eshgh Concert	Alireza Cheraghchi	Roudaki Hall Tehran	Radnoandish Art and Cultural Institute
2	Duet	Piano, Percussions, Electronic music	2023	Karvan	Soroush Kamalian	Maison Internationale de Rennes	Guilart Association

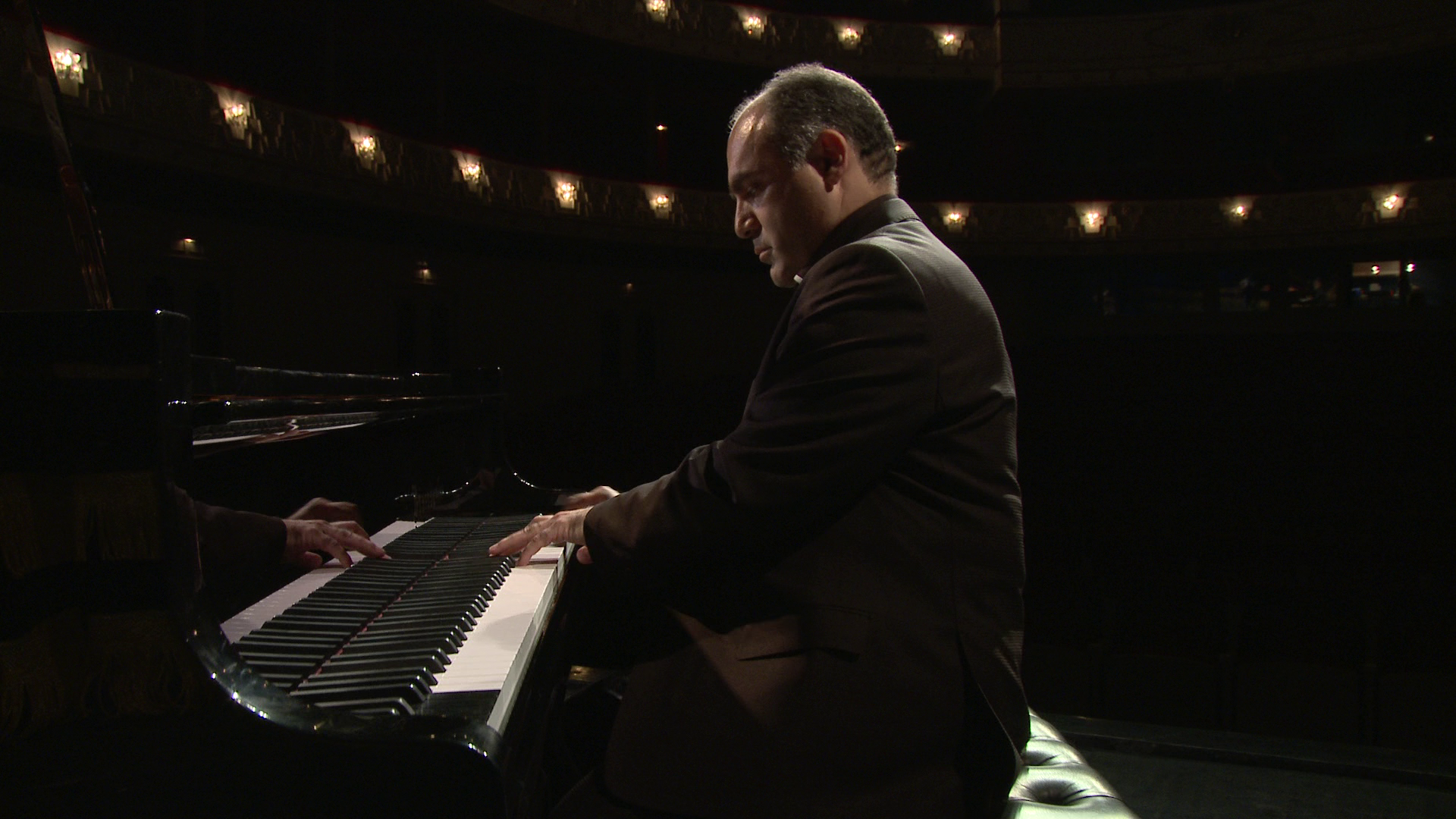
Bardia Sadrenoori "Life Goes On..." Solo Piano Improvisation Performance at Roudaki Hall 2015

=== Solo ===
Name	Instrumentation	Year	Theme	Place	Concert Producer
Solo	Piano	2015	Life Goes On... Persian Solo Piano Improvisation	Roudaki Hall Tehran	Radnoandish Art and Cultural Institute
Solo	Piano	2022	MASNAVI	Maison des associations Rennes	Guilart Association

== Discography ==
Year	Title	Publisher			
2014	Life Goes On	Radnoandish		First non-vocal solo album, Genre: Persian Classical Piano, Number of Tracks: 10	First non-Vocal Solo album, Genre: Persian Classical Piano, Number of Tracks: 10
2016	The Life Melody	Radnoandish		Second non-vocal solo album, Genre: Persian Classical Piano, Number of Tracks: 5	Second non-Vocal Solo album, Genre: Persian Classical Piano, Number of Tracks: 5
2016	Memories	Radnoandish		Third non-vocal solo album, Genre: Persian Classical Piano, Number of Tracks: 6	Third non-Vocal Solo album, Genre: Persian Classical Piano, Number of Tracks: 6
2017	On Separation	Radnoandish		Fourth non-vocal solo album, Genre: Persian Classical Piano, Number of Tracks: 4	Fourth non-Vocal Solo album, Genre: Persian Classical Piano, Number of Tracks: 4
2018	Adoration	Radnoandish		Fifth non-vocal solo album, Genre: Persian Classical Piano, Number of Tracks: 9	
2020	Romance in the Rain	Radnoandish	In collaboration with Babak Sadrenoori		
2020	The Sounds from Rounds	Radnoandish	In collaboration with Sadegh Cheraghi	Duet album Piano & Duduk, Genre: Persian Classical music, Number of Tracks: 11	
2020	Blithe & Swank	Radnoandish		Sixth non-vocal solo album, Genre: Persian Classical Piano, Number of Track: 5	
2023	Those Days	-	In collaboration with Omid Nik Bin	Instrumental orchestral album, Genre: Persian Classical music, Number of Tracks: 7	

His outstanding piano playing style led him to several collaborations with major and well known Iranian musicians including;

Year	Album Title	Song	Singer	Song Writer	Composer	Piano	Publisher
2016	"Bahane e To" (Persian: بهانه تو)]	Piano & Melody	Mehdi Fallah (Persian: مهدی فلاح)	Fereydoon Moshiri	Nasser Izadi	Bardia Sadrenoori	Radnoandish
2018	"Negah e Asemani" (Persian: نگاه آسمانی)	Piano & Melody	Salar Aghili	Mohammad-Reza Shafiei Kadkani	Nasser Izadi	Bardia Sadrenoori	Radnoandish

== Recognition ==
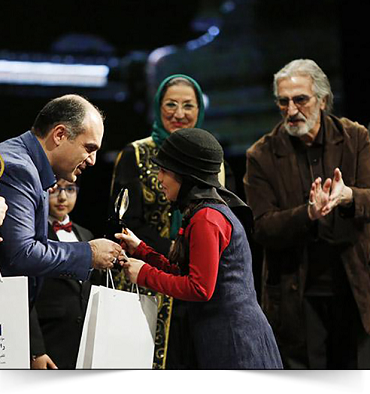
Bardia Sadrenoori on left with "Pari Maleki" on right at 4th Khorram Annual Festival.

In November 2014, "The Navay e Khorram Honorary Award Festival"" under Bardia Sadrenoori Management, as the same aim, objective and vision which Homayoun Khorram had been always dream of for Iranian musicians and art lovers. Despite Bardia sadrenoori'a efforts and works towards classical national Iranian music he kept encouraging communities in order to promote young talents to engage in such activity as improving classical music. Moreover, on 2018 the 5th anniversary of "navay e khorram festival" has received an enormous number of new entry level of participants such as conductors and musicians of age between 8 and 15 which has been another limelight as global awareness
