= Houshang Ostovar =

Iranian composer

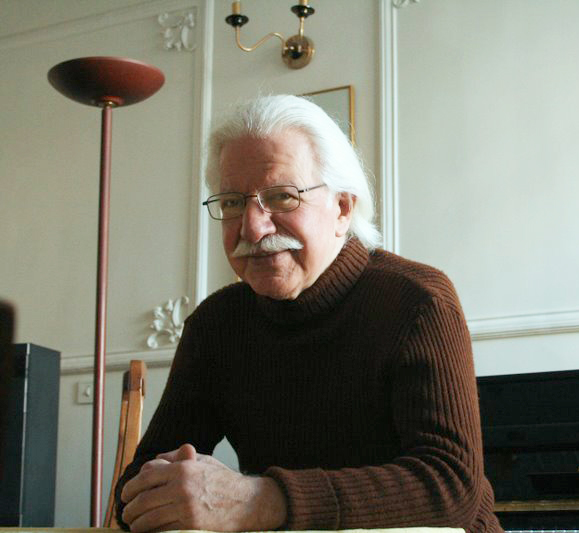

Background information
- Born: 30 January 1927; Tehran, Imperial State of Iran
- Died: 7 January 2016 (aged 88) Brive-la-Gaillarde, France
- Occupations: Professor of composition, Composer
- Instrument: Piano
- Formerly of: Tehran Symphony Orchestra

Amir Houshang Ostovar (Persian: هوشنگ استوار; 30 January 1927 – 7 January 2016), also transcribed as Hoochang Ostovar, was a Persian symphonic music composer and Instructor.

== Biography ==
Houshang Ostovar was born in Tehran 1927. Inspired by his father Hossein Ostovar (1896–1986) who was one of the first Persian-style pianists.
He studied basic composition with Parviz Mahmoud and finished his music studies at the Royal Conservatory of Brussels with first rank. He also spent 2 years at the Geneva conservatory to learn more about the Piano and Clarinet
He returned to Iran in 1952. For many years Ostovar was a professor at the Tehran Conservatory of Music. Mostly performed by the Tehran Symphony Orchestra, his works were inspired by Persian folk and classical music in a modern form. He is also known as a developer of different genres of western music such as Jazz in Iran.

A few years after the 1979 Iranian Revolution Ostovar moved to France. In 2001, he returned to Tehran and continued his activities as a professor of composition. He has taught many notable musicians like Ali Tajvidi and Mahyar Dean from Angband.

== Works ==
The only released work of Ostovar is Suite Iranienne (Persian Suite) which was performed in 1980 by Nuremberg Symphony Orchestra, conducted by Alexander Rahbari in the LP Symphonische Dichtungen aus Persien (Symphonic Poems from Persia).

== See also ==
- Music of Iran
- List of Iranian musicians
