= Opera Orchestra of Dushanbe =

The Opera Orchestra of Dushanbe is an orchestra from Tajikistan. In November 2011 the Iranian Arash Amini was guest conductor of the orchestra at an event, following which he was presented with an award by Tajikistan's Ministry of Culture.
