= Vahdat Hall =

Performing arts complex in Tehran, Iran

Coordinates: 35°41′59.12″N 51°24′40″E

Vahdat Hall / Roudaki Hall
- تالار رودکی / تالار وحدت; Tālār-e Vahdat / Tālār e Rudaki
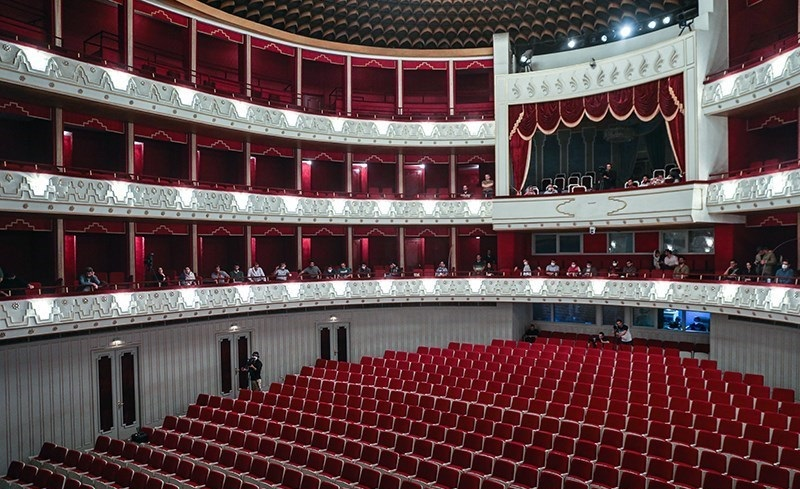

General information
- Type: Opera House
- Location: Shahriyar Street, Hafez street corner, Tehran, Iran
- Construction started: 1957
- Completed: 1967
- Inaugurated: October 26, 1967

Technical details
- Floor area: 92,000 m^{2} (990,280 sq ft)

Design and construction
- Architect: Eugene Aftandilian

The Vahdat Hall (Persian: تالار وحدت, romanized: Tālār-e Vahdat), previously known as Roudaki Hall (also spelled Roodaki or Rudaki; Persian: تالار رودکی, romanized: Tālār e Rudaki) is a performing arts complex in Tehran, Iran.

== History ==
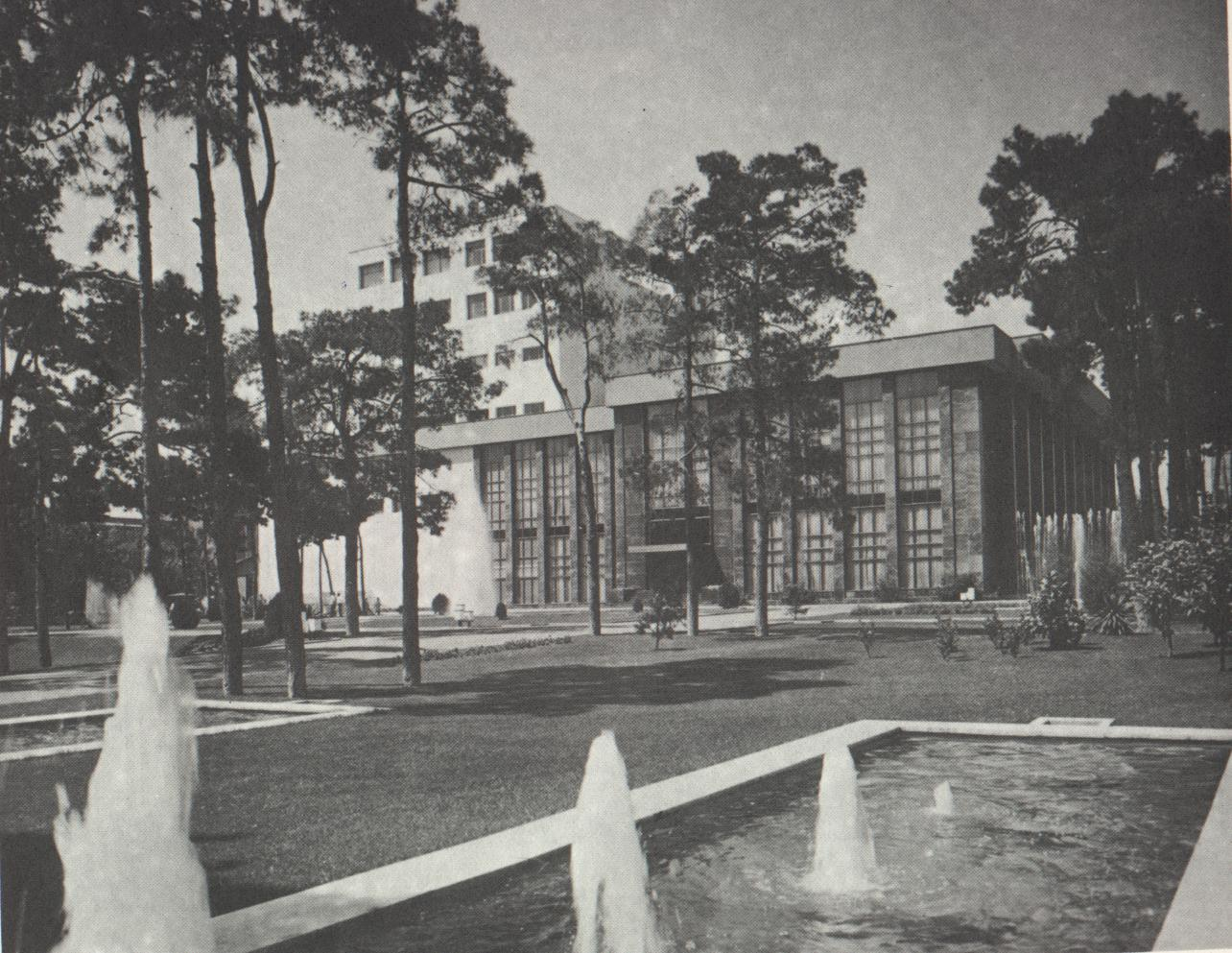
View of the Hall, 1970.

Around the 1950s and 1970s, the Iranian national stage had become the most famous performing scene for known international artists and troupes in West Asia, with the Vahdat Hall constructed in the capital of the country to function as the national stage for opera and ballet performances.

=== Construction ===
The complex was designed by architect Eugene Aftandilian, influenced by the Vienna State Opera, and was constructed during a period of ten years starting in 1957. It was equipped with the latest lighting and sound system technologies of the time, with revolving and moving stages. The main stage consists of three different levels (podiums). The auditorium seats 1200 and has two tiers of boxes and balconies. The venue was fully supplied by Siemens Electrics. The main curtain in proscenium has a motif of a phoenix rising from the ashes, with the style of Persian miniature.

Just before the completion of Tehran's new opera house, Nejad Ahmadzadeh, artistic director of the Iranian National Ballet Company, was sent by the Ministry of Culture and Arts to the United States to visit their opera houses and study administrative, organizational, and technical constructions of American opera establishments that were deemed to be the most modern in the West. At his return, he was appointed as manager of the upcoming opera house, and established the technical, administrative, and artistic sections of the Vahdat Hall. The constructions of the hall were eventually completed in 1967.

=== Inauguration ===
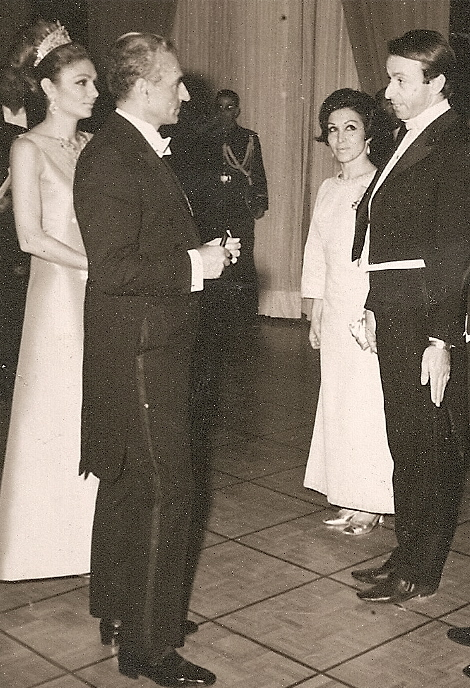
Robert de Warren (right) being presented to the Shah (left) and Shahbanu Farah (far left).

A part of the White Revolution, the Vahdat Hall of Tehran was inaugurated by Mohammad Reza Shah and Shahbanu Farah Pahlavi on 26 October 1967 with the performance of the Rustic Festival, the first Persian opera, composed by Ahmad Pejman. Two weeks of full house performances by international ensembles marked the coronation festivities. Numerous orchestras, opera singers, and dance companies were invited to perform for the occasion.

The hall is home to the Tehran Symphony Orchestra, Tehran Opera Orchestra, and the Iranian National Ballet Company. Other troupes, ensembles, and artists, such as the Iranian folk dancers, also used the stage of the Vahdat Hall for their performances.

== Productions and guest presentations ==
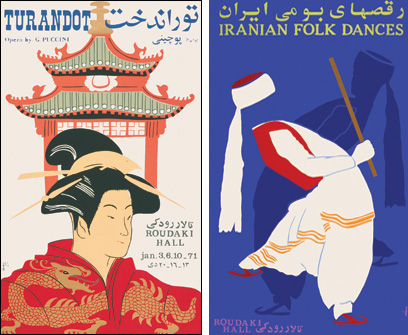

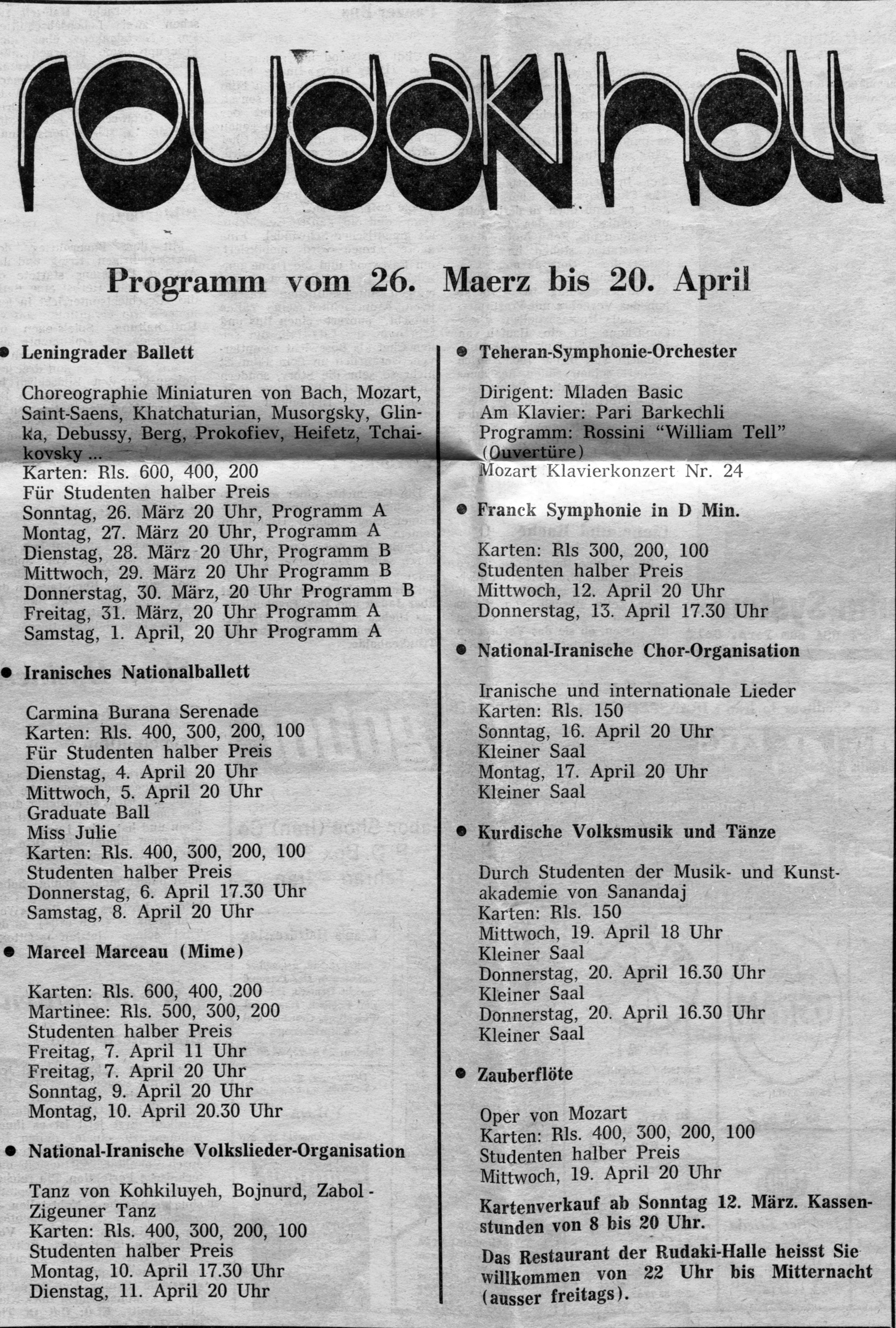

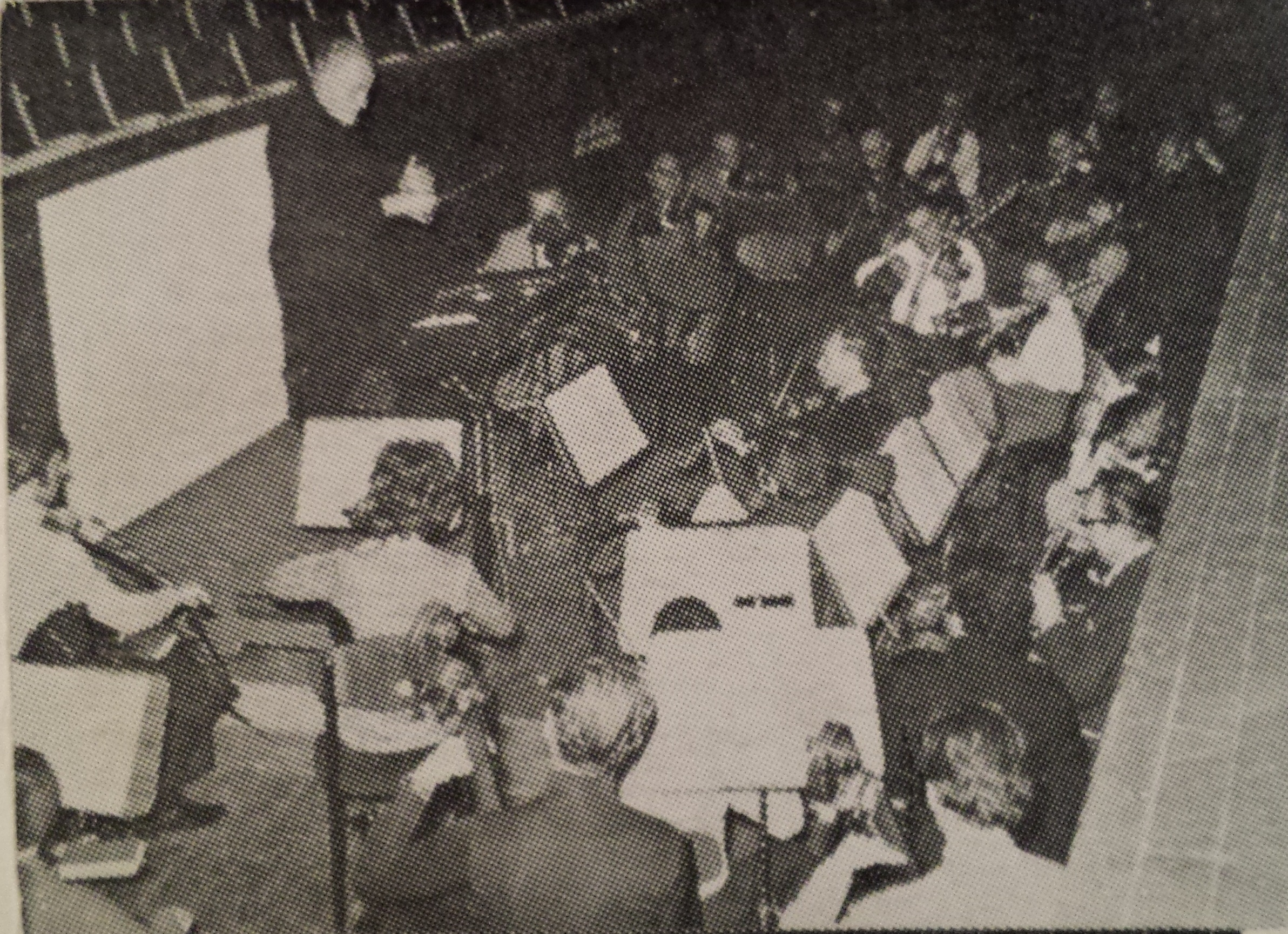
Tehran Opera Orchestra, 1972.

=== Before the 1979 Revolution ===
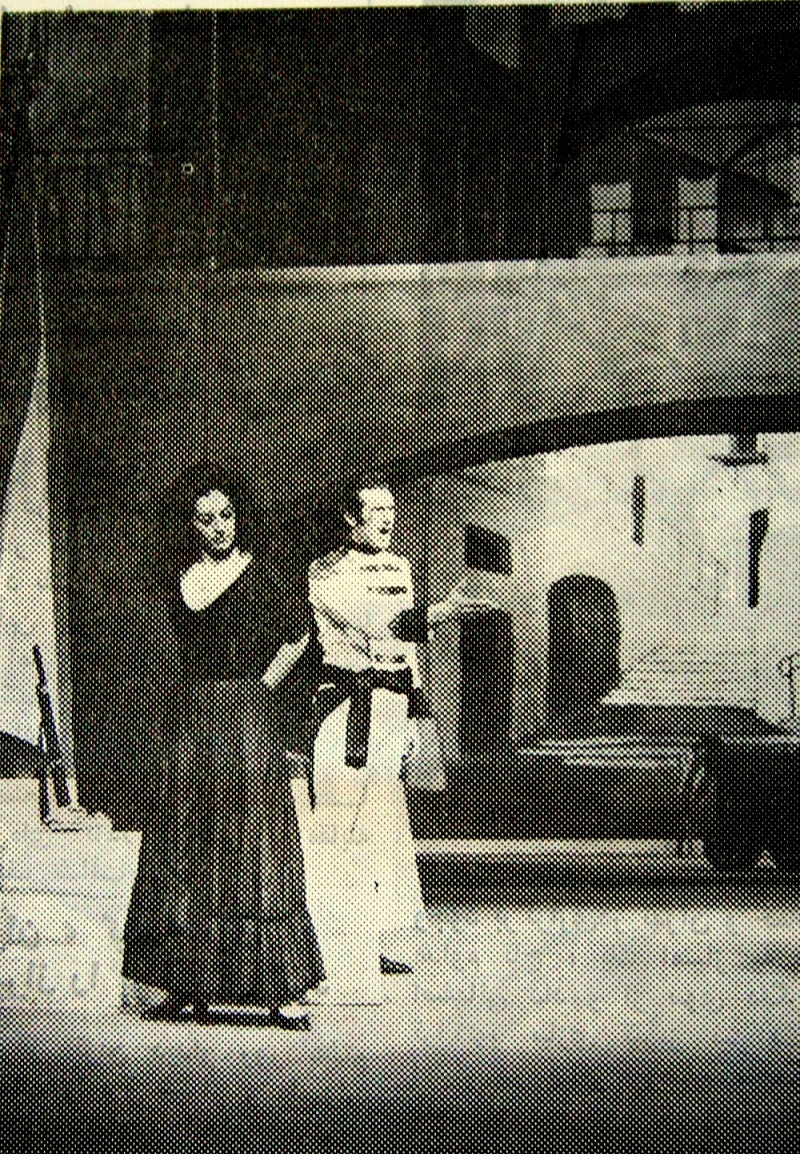
Pari Samar, Iranian opera singer, performing in Carmen (1975).

==== Ballet ====
- Bijan and Manijeh (1975)
- La Bayadère (Season 1972–73)
- Myth of the Creation (1971)
- Nutcracker (1971)
- Bolero
- The Firebird (1967)
- Carmina Burana
- The Witch Boy
- The Fountain of Bakhchisaray (Season 73–74)
- Swan Lake (Season 1971–72)
- Petroushka
- Les Sylphides
- Giselle (Season 1970–71)
- La Fille Mal Gardée
- Romeo and Juliet (1968)
- Scheherazade
- Coppélia (Season 1972–72)
- Miss Julie
- Cinderella (1969)
- Serenade
- The Sleeping Beauty (1978)

==== Opera ====
- The Rustic Festival 1967
- Hero of Sahand (Delavareh Sahand)1968
- Pardis and Parisa
- La traviata
- Orfeo ed Euridice
- Madama Butterfly
- Turandot (1971)
- La bohème
- Carmen
- Nabucco (1976)
- Falstaff (1977)
- Werther (1977)
- Die Zauberflöte (1978)

Various national and international festivals were organized at the Roudaki Hall, including:

- International Film Festival
- Ballet and Dance Festival
- Folk Dance Festival
- Annual Festival of Culture and Arts

Since the inauguration of the Roudaki Hall in 1967 until the last stagings in the fall season of 1978, world famous music, opera, and dance artists visited Iran to stage their works. Presentations of the guest artists and ensembles included:

==== Guest ballet companies ====
- Kirov Ballet (Mariinsky Ballet)
- The Igor Moiseyev Ballet
- Le Grand Ballet Classique de France
- Antonio Gades Flamenco Ensemble
- Stuttgart Ballet
- Berliner Ballett
- Le Ballet de XXe Siécle (Ballet of the 20th Century)
- Nederlands Dans Theater (1977)

==== Guest ballet artists (dancers / choreographers) ====
- Rudolf Nureyev
- Margot Fonteyn
- Robert de Warren
- Liane Daydé
- William Dollar
- John Cranko
- Marcia Haydée
- Richard Cragun
- Robert Urazgildiev
- Maurice Béjart
- Alvin Ailey
- Jiri Kylian

==== Guest opera singers ====
- Elisabeth Schwarzkopf
- Giuseppe Taddei
- Cesare Siepi
- Leo Goeke
- Delme Bryn-Jones

Ingrid Rezai Anayatolla Rezai Monier Vaquilli

==== Guest music ensembles ====
- Moscow Symphony Orchestra
- Los Angeles Philharmonic Orchestra
- Berliner Philharmoniker
- Stuttgarter Kammerorchester

==== Guest musicians / conductors ====
- Herbert von Karajan
- Aram Khachaturian
- Yehudi Menuhin
- Sir Charles Groves
- Zubin Mehta
- Ruggiero Ricci
- Henryk Szeryng
- Claudio Arrau
- Arthur Rubinstein
- John Ogdon

==== Other presentations ====
- Marcel Marceau, the pantomime artist (1978)

=== After the 1979 Revolution ===
Roudaki Hall has remained the most important venue of Tehran. Concerts of traditional Iranian music, pop, and classical symphonic and orchestral music are staged regularly. After 1979 Revolution, Poetry Council at Office of Poetry and Music of Ministry of culture was formed in Roudaki Hall to preserve music in Iran. Some famous poets worked there, like: Mehrdad Avesta, Ahmad NikTalab (after him, Babak Niktalab), Mohammad Ali Bahmani, Moshfegh Kashani.

Among the presentations after the 1979 Revolution are:

==== Concerts ====
- Tehran Symphony Orchestra
- Nour Ensemble
- Bob Belden's ANIMATION

==== Artists ====
- Loris Tjeknavorian
- Mohammad Reza Shajarian
- Hossein Alizadeh
- Bardia Sadrenoori
- Ahmad Pejman
- Parvaz Homay
- Peyman Yazdanian
- Alireza Ghorbani
- Homayoun Shajarian
- Kayhan Kalhor
- Mohammad Reza Shajarian
- Alireza Eftekhari

==== Events ====
- Tehran Art Expo.

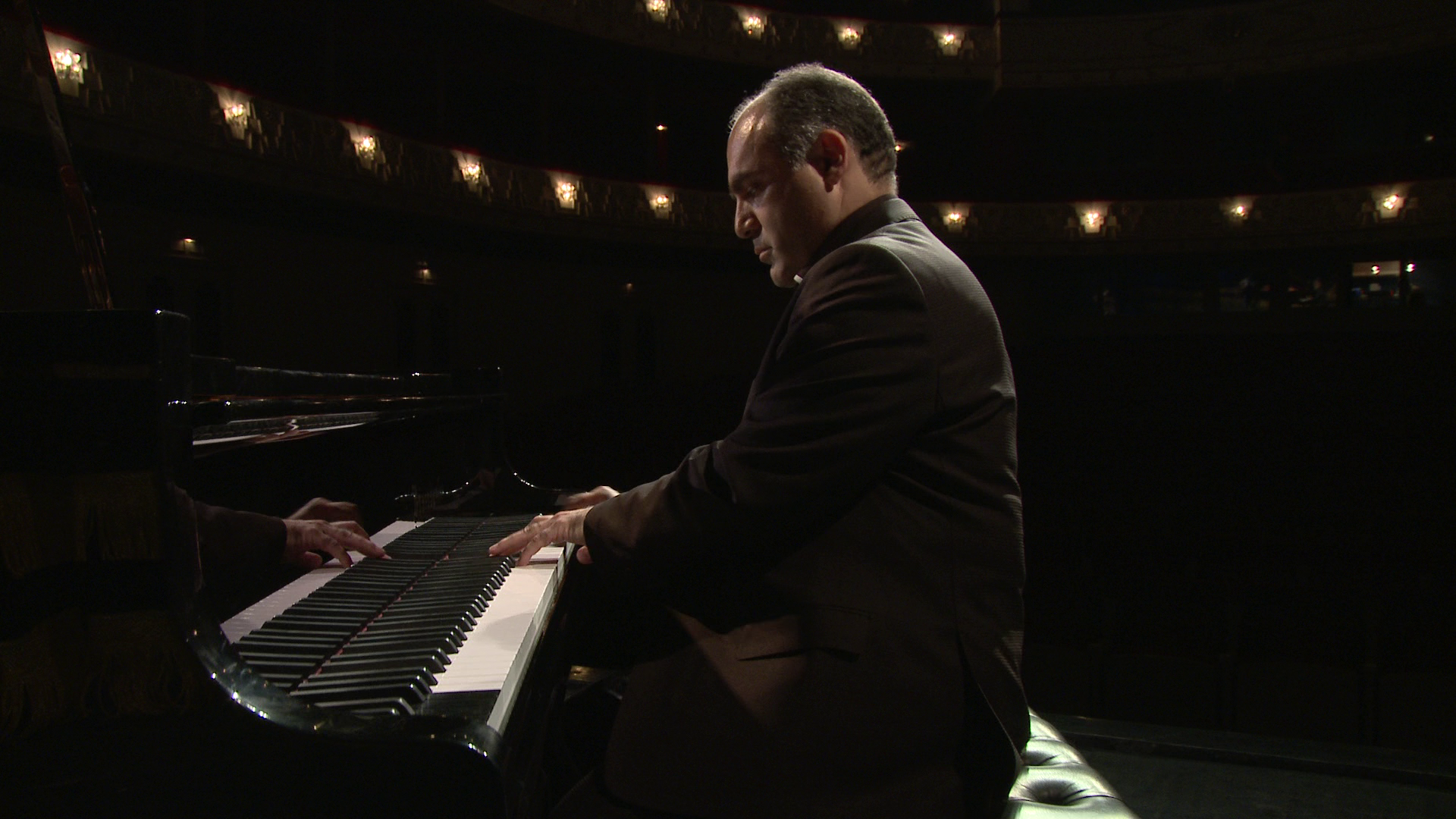
Bardia Sadrenoor Solo Piano Performance "Life goes On..." at Roudaki Hall

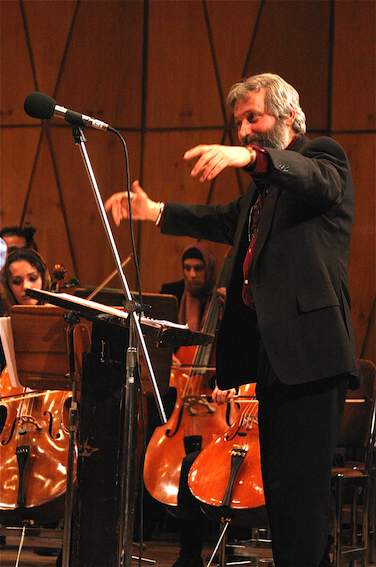
Ghamar Band at Roudaki Hall, 2013.

==== Guest presentation ====
- Dundee Repertory Theater

== Specifications ==
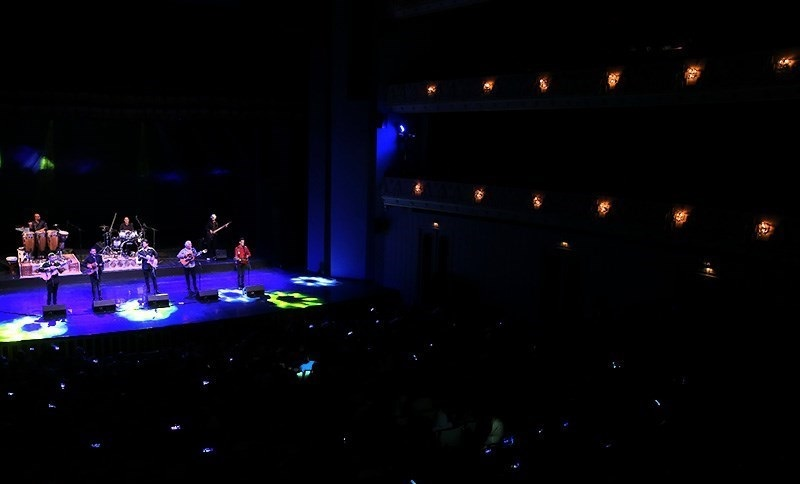
Spanish group Gipsy Kings's concert, on 12 August 2016.

Total capacity of the hall is about 750 seats; with 500 seats in the main hall, and 250 seats in the balconies.

== Operational and artistic directors ==
=== General directors ===
- Hamed Rowhani (1967–?)
- Sadi Hassani (in between the other two)
- Abedin Zanganeh (?–1979)
- ? (1979–?) (after the 1979 Revolution and before the re-organization of the hall in 2003)

Following a legislation from the Parliament of Iran in 2003, the operation management of the hall was reorganized. A new non-governmental public foundation was established in order to be in charge of the Roudaki Hall. The CEOs of Roudaki Foundation, responsible for the operation of Roudaki Hall have been:

- Mehdi Massoudshahi (2003–2008)
- Ali Asghar Amirnia (2008–2010)
- Hossein Parsaee (2010–2011)
- Alireza Hosseini (2011–2013)
- Hossein Seyfi (2013–2014)
- Bahram Jamali (2014–2016)
- Ali Akbar Safipour (2016–2019)
- Mehdi Afzali (2019–2022)
- Majid Zeinolabedin (2022–2023)
- Mehdi Salem (2023)
- Mohammad Allahyari Foumani (2023–present)

=== Ballet directors ===
- Nejad Ahmadzadeh (1967–1976)

The Iranian National Ballet Company was founded in 1958 and moved to the Roudaki Hall in 1967.

- Ali Pourfarrokh (1976–1979) held the position until disbanding of the Iranian National Ballet.

=== Opera directors ===
- Enayat Rezai (1967–1979)

Naamloos document

=== Music directors ===
- Farhad Meshkat
- Alexander Rahbari (2015–2016)
- Shahrdad Rouhani (2016–2020)
- Nassir Heidarian-Rasty (2022–2023)
- Manouchehr Sahbai (2023–2025)
- Nassir Heidarian-Rasty (2025–present)

== Gallery ==
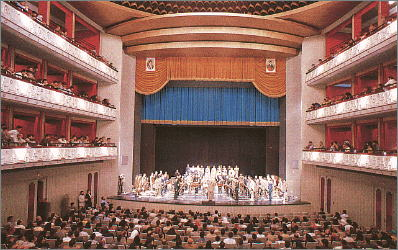
Auditorium of the hall

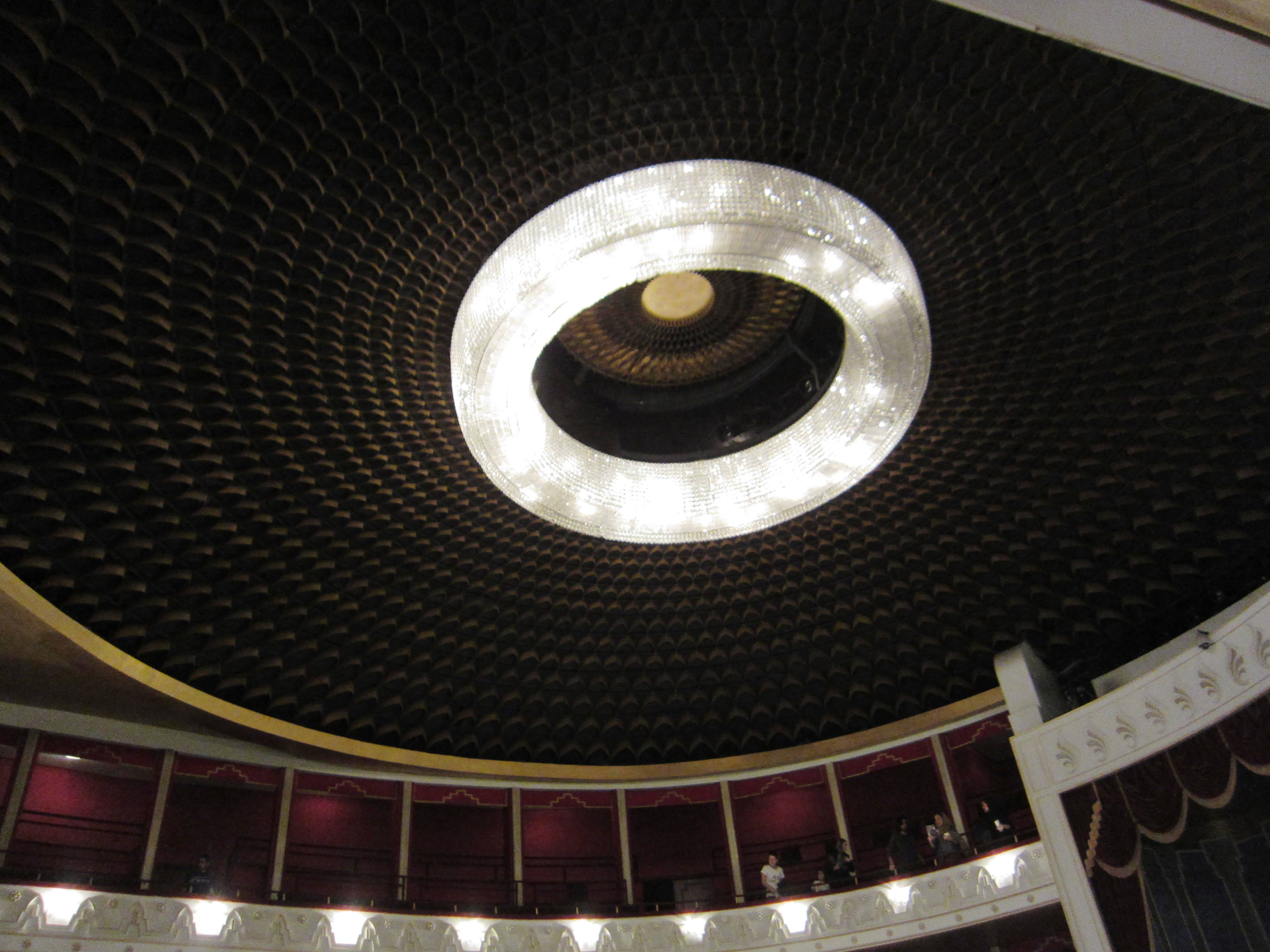
The ceiling of the hall

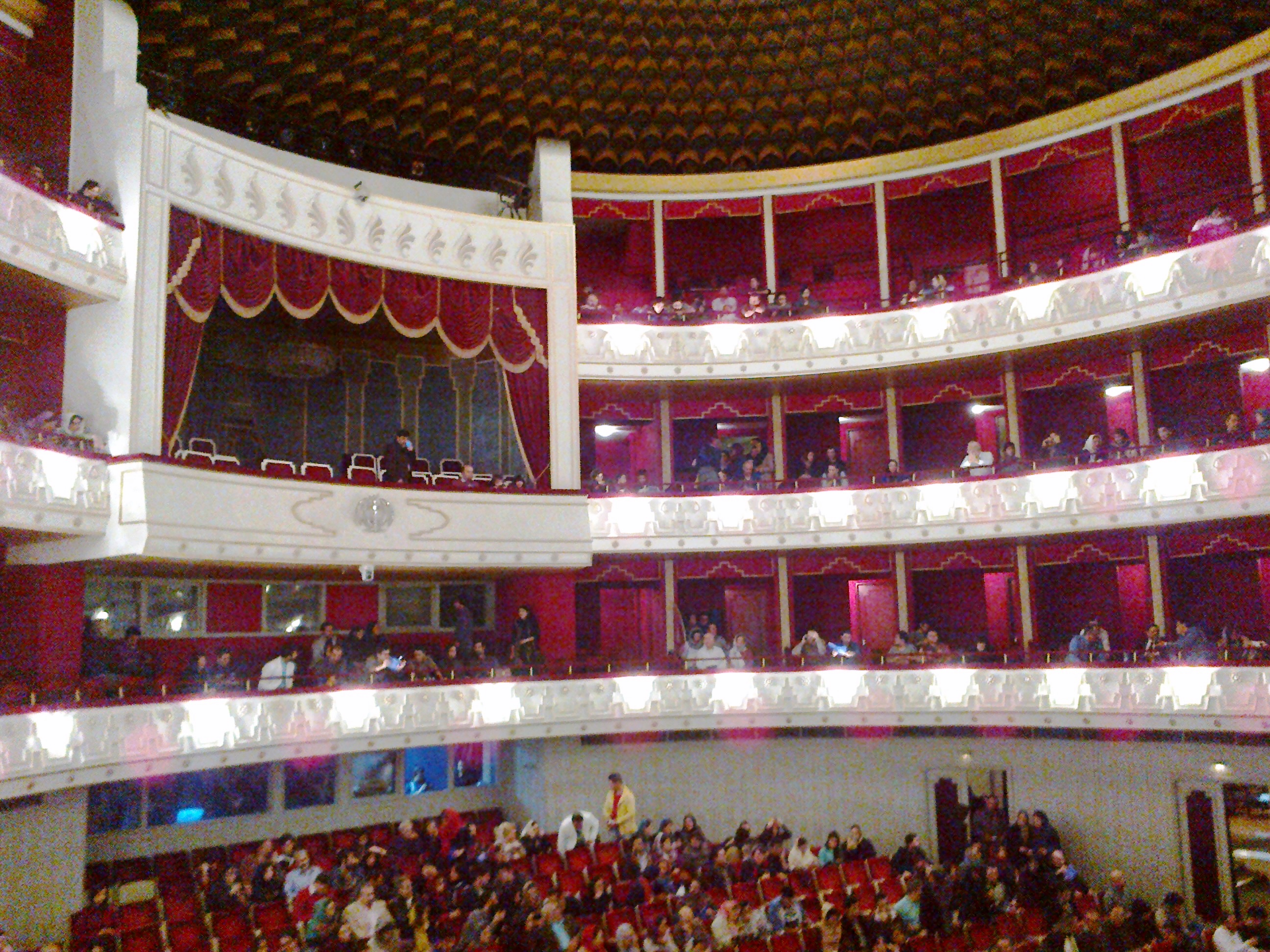
Eastern balconies and the special position

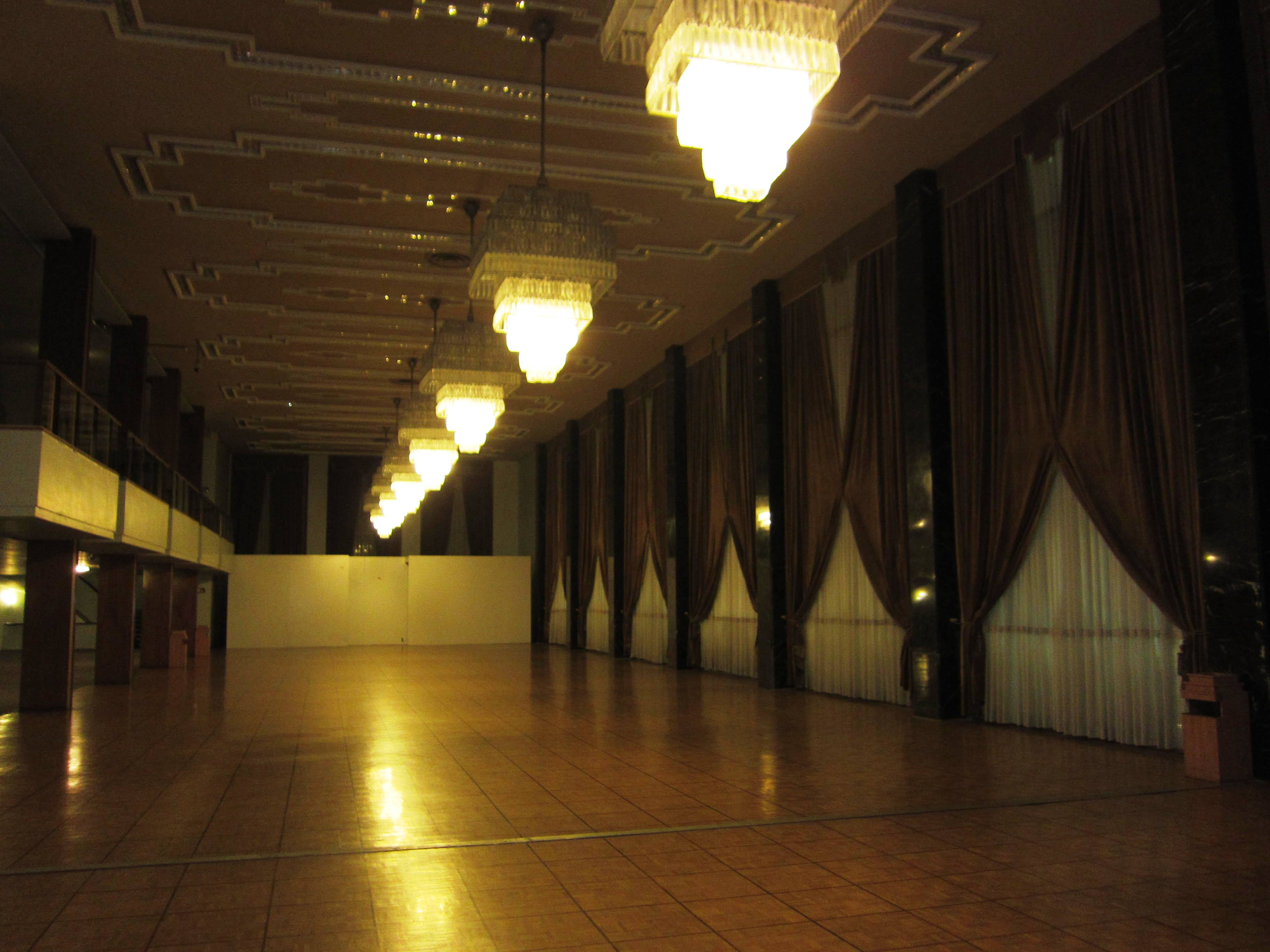
Second floor of the complex

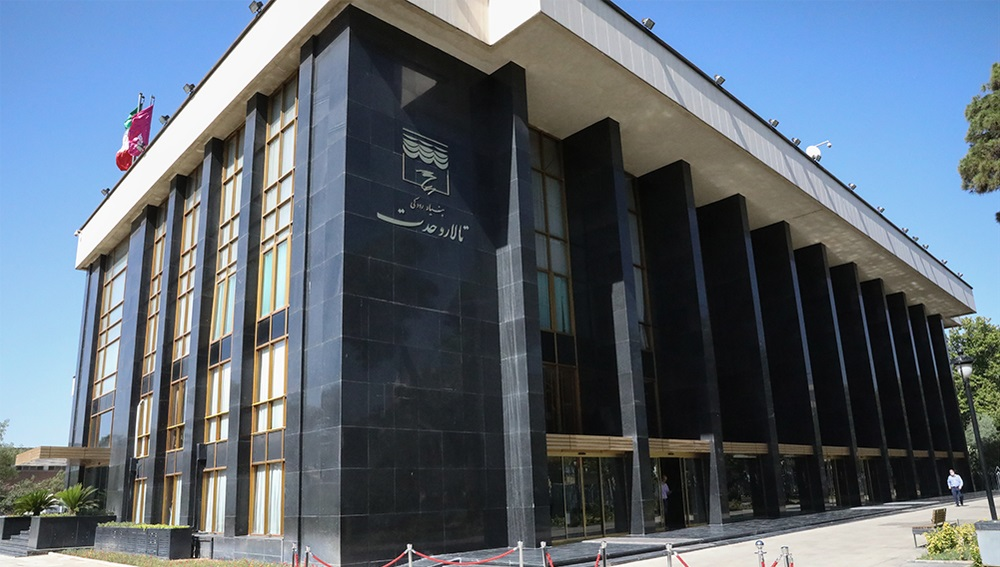
Exterior of the complex
