= Tehran Symphony Orchestra =

Iran's symphony orchestra

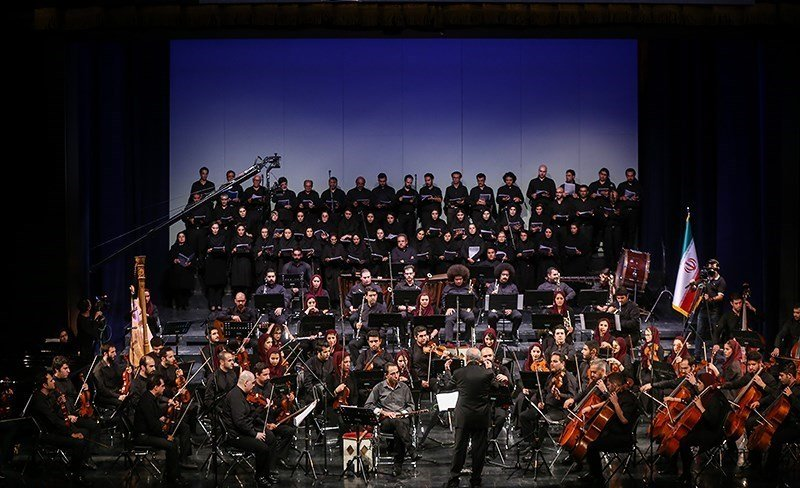
- Tehran Symphony Orchestra, conducted by Shahrdad Rohani in Roudaki Hall
- Native name: ارکستر سمفونیک تهران
- Short name: TSO
- Former name: Municipality Symphony Orchestra
- Founded: 1933
- Principal conductor: Nassir Heidarian-Rasty

The Tehran Symphony Orchestra (TSO, Persian: ارکستر سمفونیک تهران), founded in 1933, is Iran's oldest and largest symphony orchestra. It was founded as the Municipality Symphony Orchestra by Gholamhossein Minbashian and modernized by Parviz Mahmoud in 1946. He was followed by Rubik (Rouben) Gregorian, Morteza Hannaneh, Haymo Taeuber, Heshmat Sanjari, and Farhad Meshkat.

After the 1979 Revolution, many musicians of the TSO emigrated to Europe and the US. For some years Heshmat Sanjari and then Fereydoun Nasseri were the conductors. The current conductor of TSO is Nassir Heidarian-Rasty.

== 1933–1979 ==
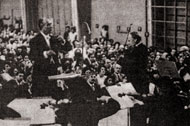
Yehudi Menuhin plays with Tehran Symphony Orchestra with Heshmat Sanjari as the conductor 1967

In the golden age of the orchestra, many notable musicians like Yehudi Menuhin and Isaac Stern played with the orchestra.

== 1979–present ==
After the 1979 Iranian revolution, clerics outlawed all pre-revolutionary music, hardline clerics say music comes between the faithful and God, and leads to an impure mind. As a result, the orchestra faced its darkest age, playing only a few concerts in the decade following the revolution. The pressure caused the conductor Heshmat Sanjari a serious sickness, he died in 1995.

The orchestra still plays concerts once in a while.

== Principal conductors ==
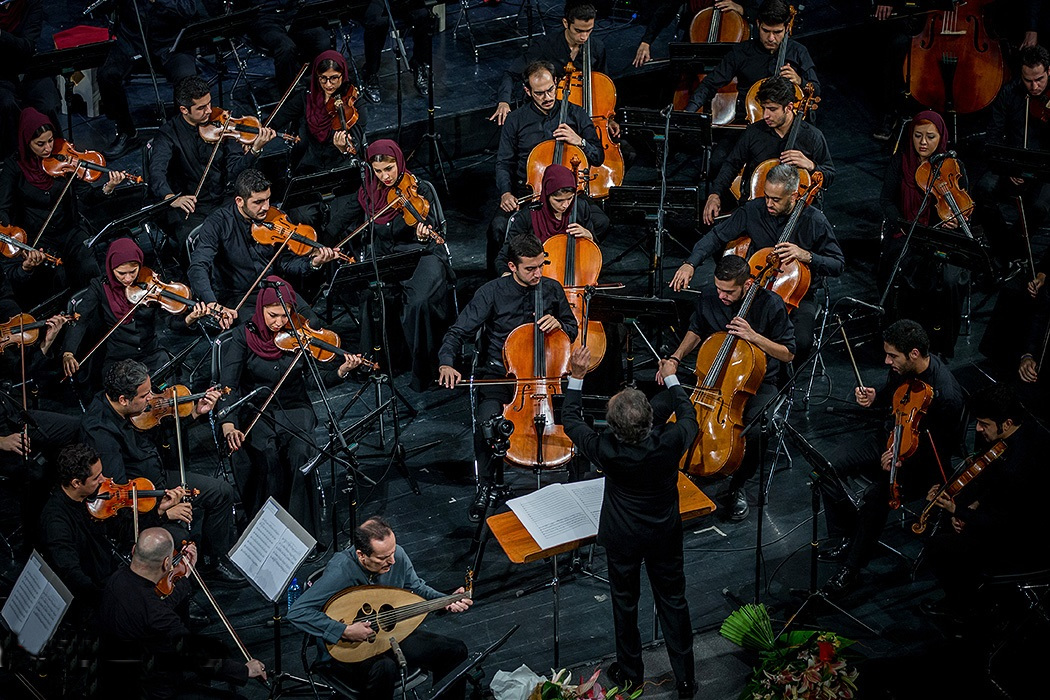
Tehran Symphony Orchestra performs at Roudaki Hall, 2018

- Parviz Mahmoud (1946–1948)
- Rouben Gregorian (1948–1951)
- Morteza Hannaneh (1952–1954)
- Haymo Taeuber (1957–1960)
- Heshmat Sanjari (1960–1971)
- Farhad Meshkat (1972–1978)
- Bijan Ghaderi (1980–1982)
- Nader Mortezapour (1982–1984)
- Fereydoun Nasseri (1990–1994)
- Ali Rahbari (2004–2005)
- Nader Mashayekhi (2006–2007)
- Manouchehr Sahbai (2007–2010)
- Alexander Rahbari (2015–2016)
- Shahrdad Rohani (2016–2020)
- Wolfgang Wengenroth (guest conductor 2022)
- Nassir Heidarian-Rasty (2022–2023)
- Manouchehr Sahbai (2023–2025)
- Nassir Heidarian-Rasty (2025–present)

== Gallery ==
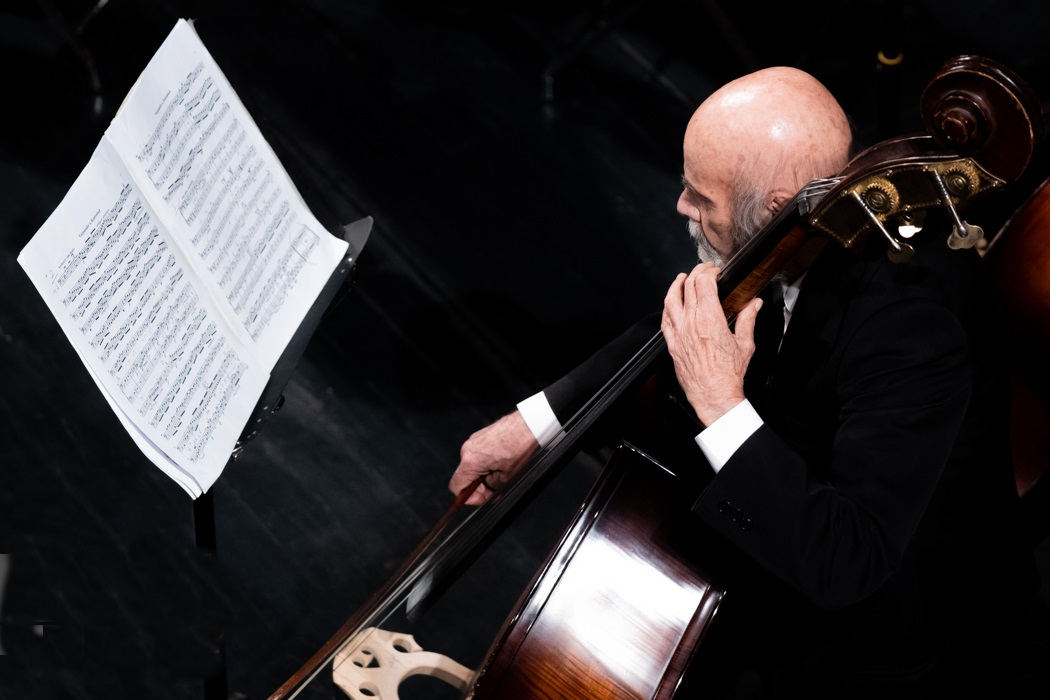

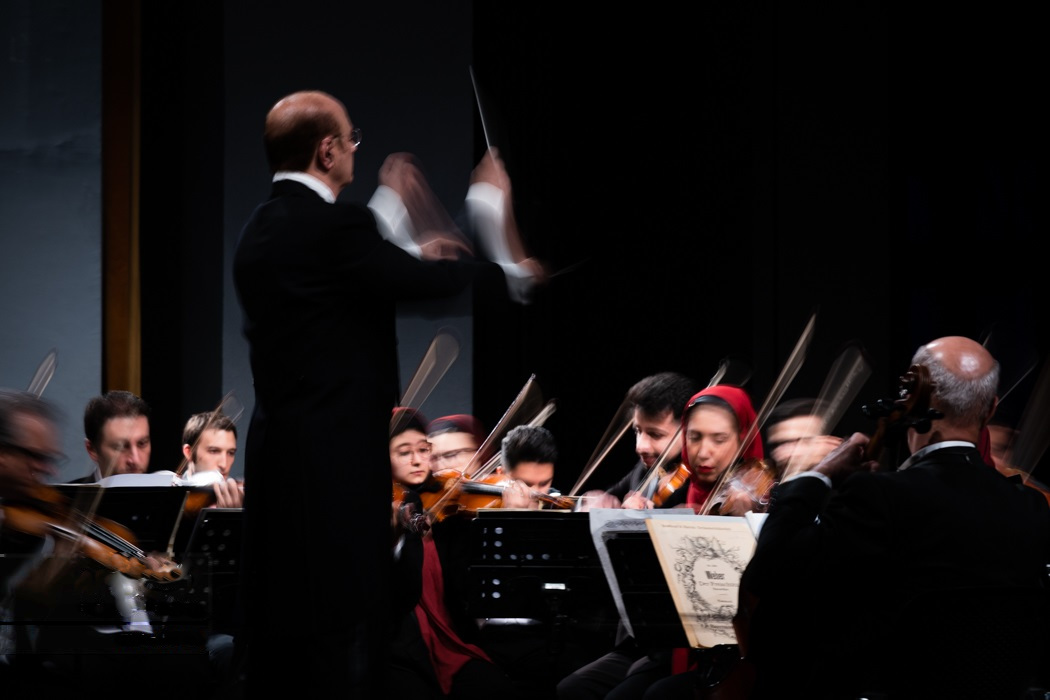

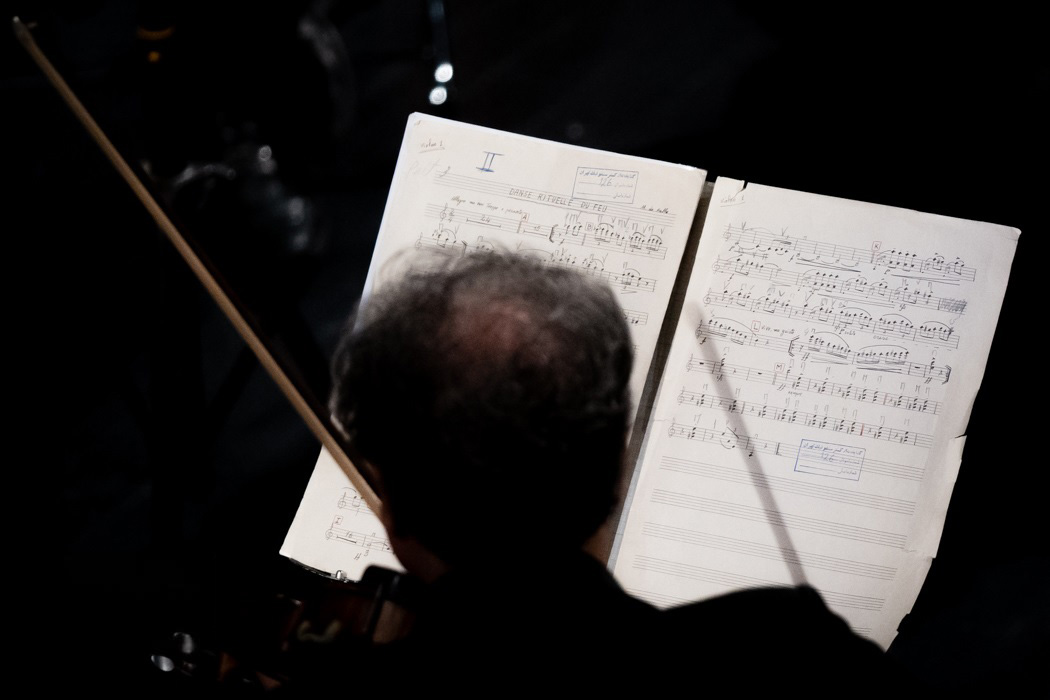

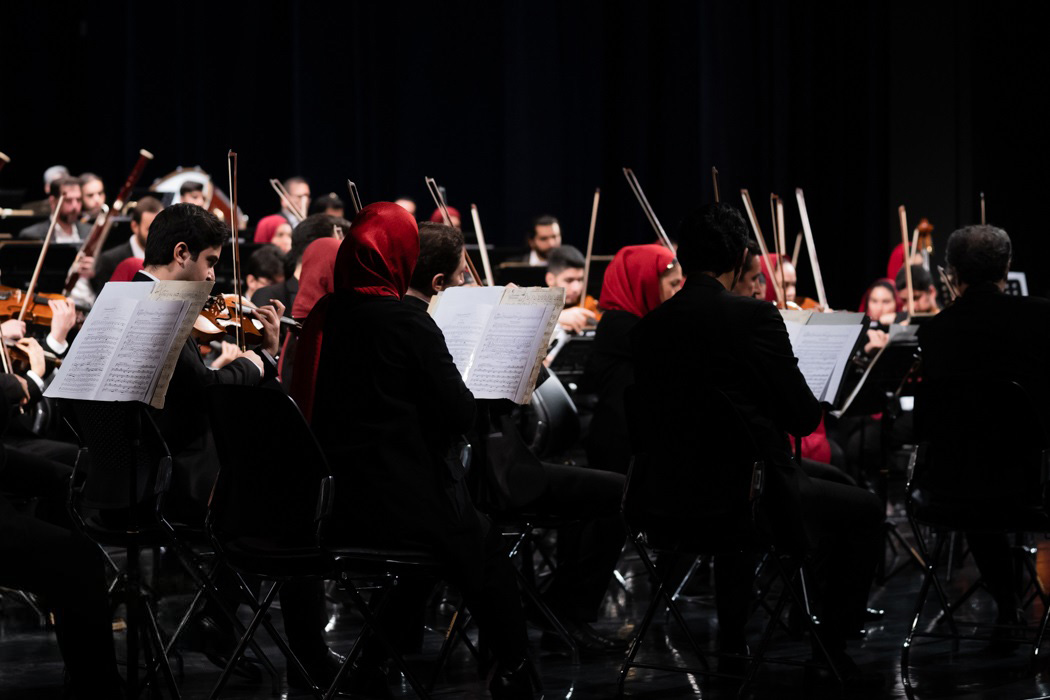

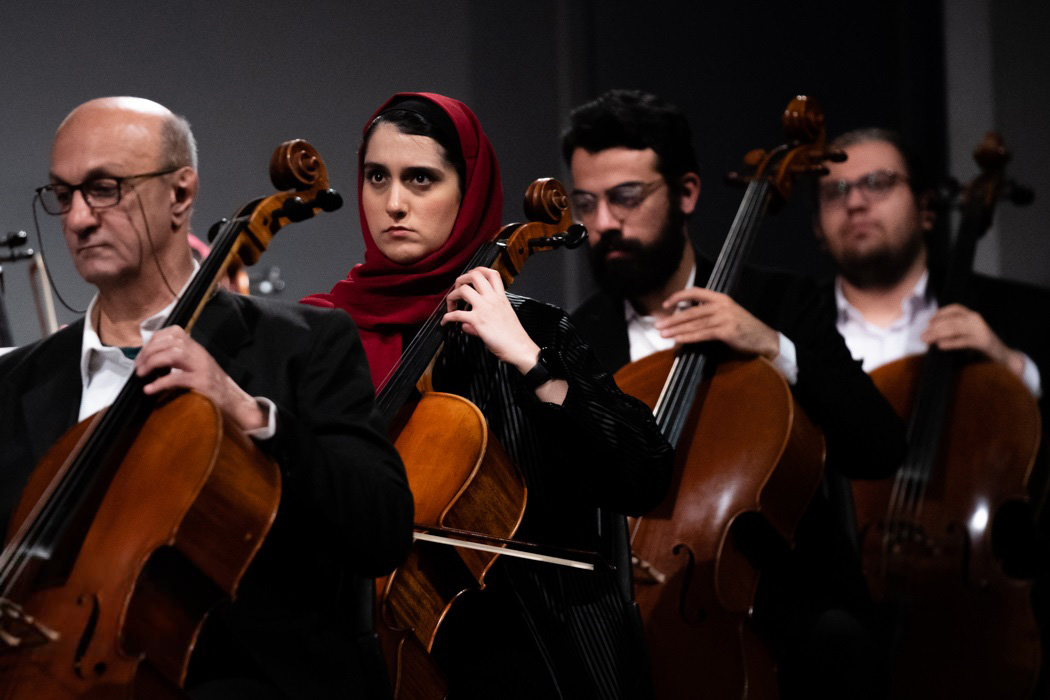

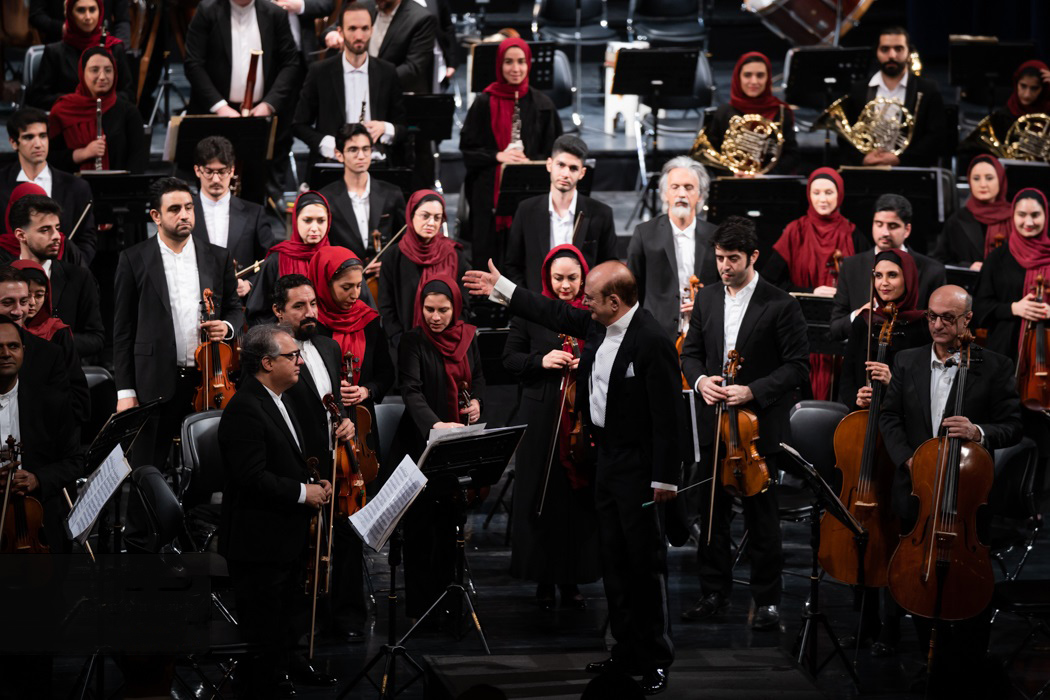

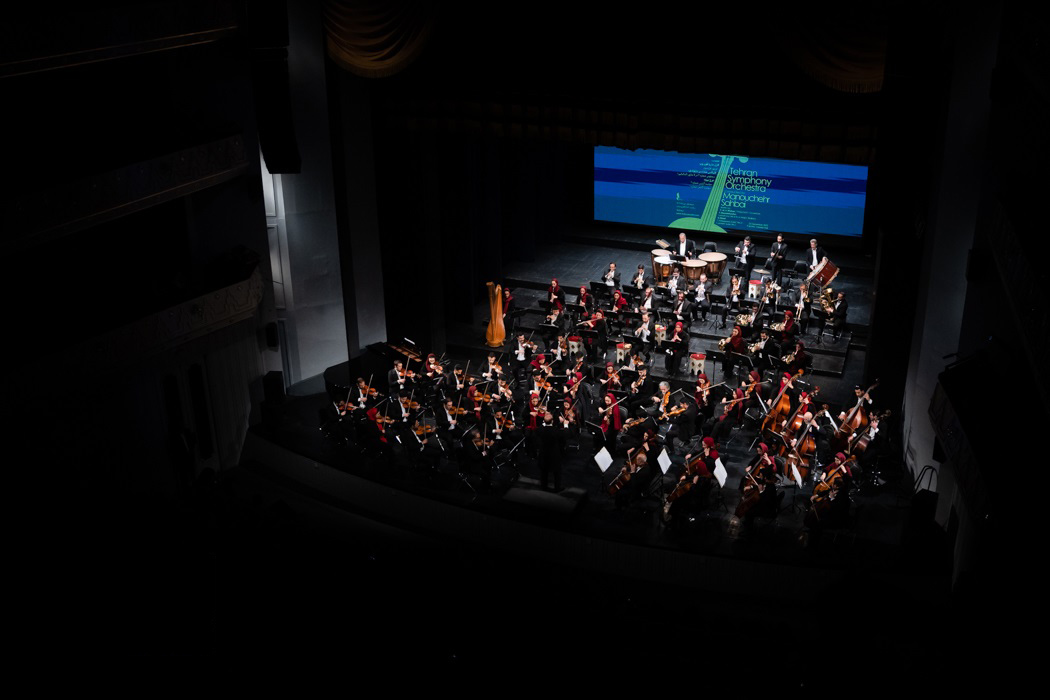

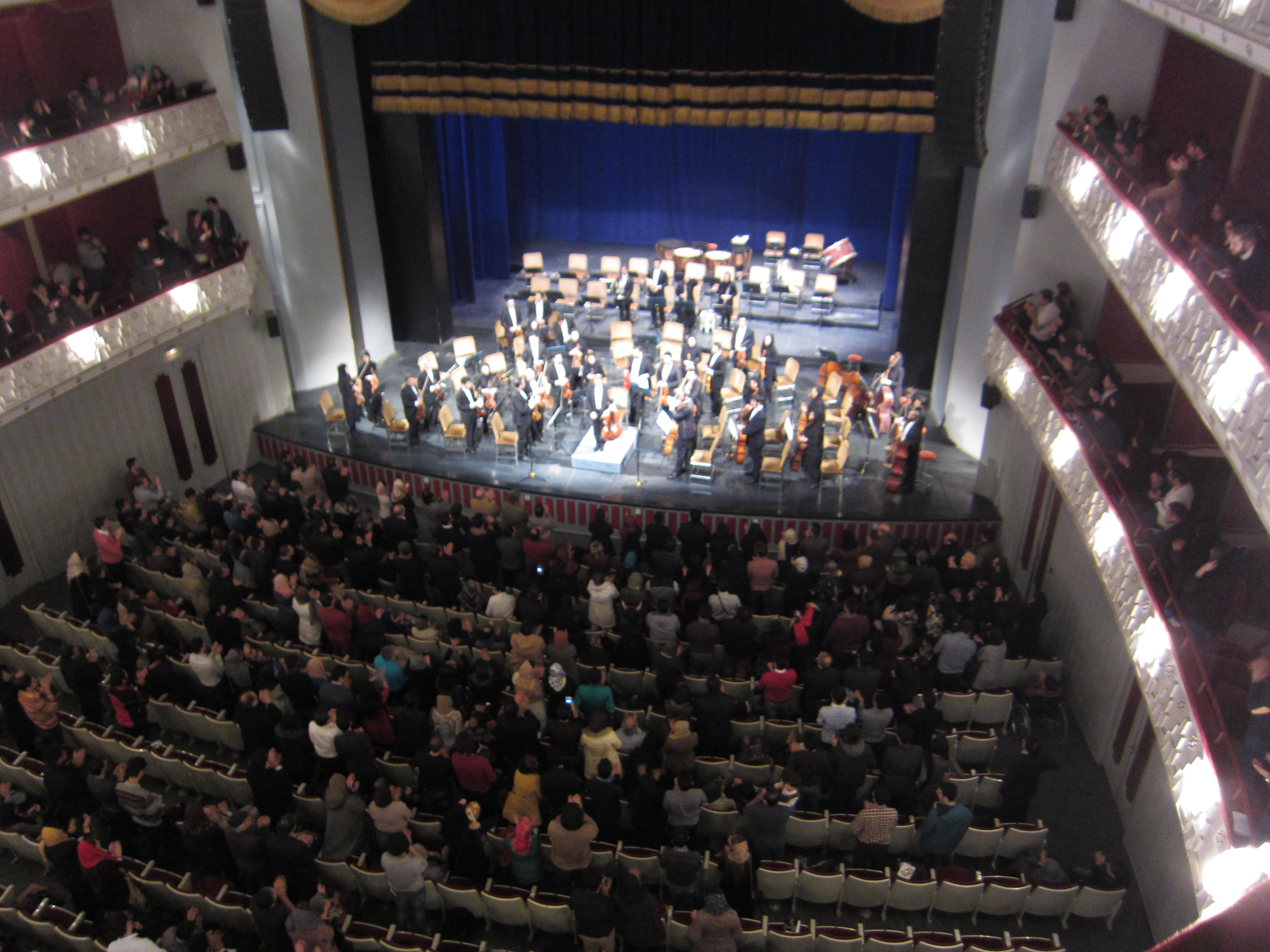

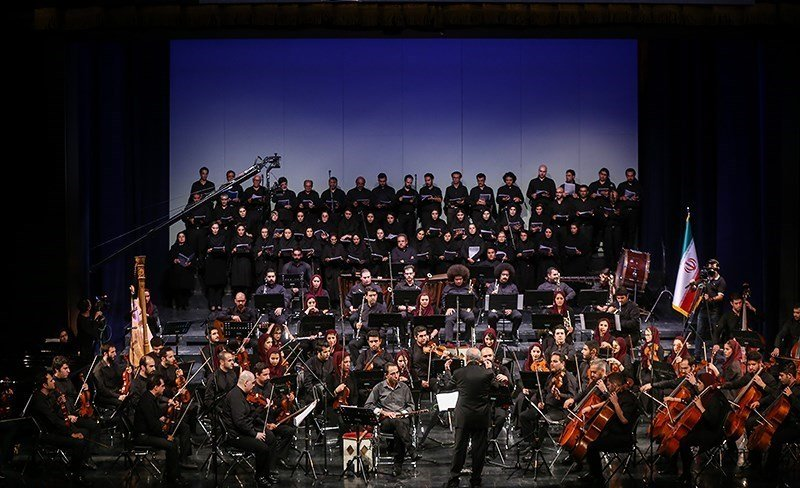

== See also ==
- Music of Iran
- Iranian Orchestra for New Music
- Iran's Children Orchestra
- Iran's National Orchestra
- Opera Orchestra of Dushanbe
- Symphonic music in Iran
