= Heshmat Sanjari =

Heshmat Sanjari حشمت سنجری
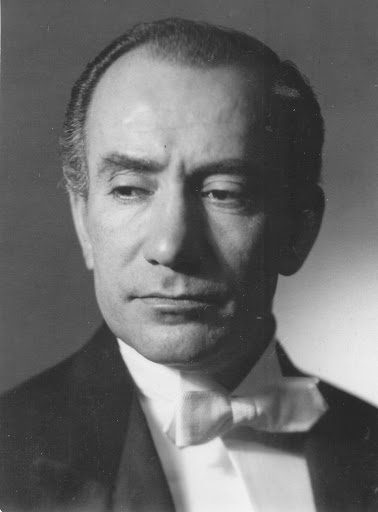

Background information
- Born: حشمت سنجری; 1 April 1917; Tehran, Iran
- Died: 4 January 1995 (aged 77) Tehran, Iran
- Genres: Classical music Persian symphonic music
- Instrument: Violin

Heshmat Sanjari, also transcribed as Sandjari (Persian: حشمت سنجری, April 1, 1917 – January 4, 1995) was a well-known Persian (Iranian) conductor and composer, the son of Hossein Sanjari who was well-known player on tar in Persia.

== Education ==
Heshmat Sanjari studied violin at the Tehran Conservatory of Music under Serge Khotsief and Conducting at the Vienna Music Academy as a pupil of Hans Swarowsky. Claudio Abbado and Zubin Mehta studied in the same class under Swarowsky.

Maestro Sanjari also studied Persian Classical music under Ali-Naqi Vaziri.

== Conducting career ==
After studying violin at the conservatory, Sanjari was the conductor of Tehran Conservatory Students Orchestra and the director of the Conservatory for a short time in 1951. From 1960 until 1971 he was the permanent conductor of the Tehran Symphony Orchestra, the longest in the history of orchestra. During this time, many notable musicians such as Yehudi Menuhin and Isaac Stern played with the orchestra, with him as the conductor.

As a guest conductor he conducted the National Iranian Radio and Television Chamber Orchestra and several European orchestras.

== Compositions ==
He composed the works Persian Pictures [تابلوهای ایرانی] (in 5 movements) and Niayesh (Praise) for choir and orchestra. The former is regarded by some as a masterpiece of contemporary Persian symphonic music. Both works have been recorded by Manuchehr Sahbai in Bulgaria with Plovdiv Philharmonic Orchestra.

== Later career ==
After the 1979 Iranian revolution, the new government looked at music as a promotion of western culture, against Islamic values, so Sanjari and orchestra played only a few concerts in 10 years after revolution.

The pressures of this new situation caused him to become depressed in 1989 and after 5 years he fell ill and died on January 4, 1995.

== See also ==
- Music of Iran
- List of Iranian musicians
