= Parviz Mahmoud =

Iranian musician (1910–1996)

Parviz Mahmoud (1910 – 1996) was an Iranian composer and conductor. He was the founder of the Tehran Symphony Orchestra in its modern form. His father Mahmoud Mahmoud (Pahlavi) was a famous Persian writer, researcher and politician. He is the son of Iranian-Azerbaijani politician, Mahmud Mahmud.

== Education ==
Parviz studied composition at the Royal Conservatory of Brussels and for a few years he was professor and director of Tehran Conservatory.

== Immigration to the US ==
In 1959 he moved to the United States and did not continue his musical activities seriously anymore. A few years after immigrating he received his PhD from the University of Indiana. His dissertation was about the theory of Persian music and its relation to Western practice. In 1958, he became the director of the symphony orchestra of the University of Dubuque in Iowa, which became the Dubuque Symphony Orchestra in 1963. He was its conductor until 1985.

== Works ==
- "Concerto for Violin & Orchestra"
- "String Quartet in E minor"
- "Persian Suite" for orchestra
- "Kurdish Fantasy" for piano and orchestra
- "Mehregan Suite" for orchestra
