= Houman Dehlavi =

Iranian musician and composer (born 1971)

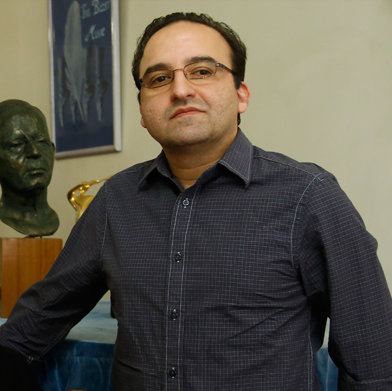
- Dehlavi in 2015

Background information
- Also known as: Houman Dehlavi
- Born: 8 July 1971 (age 55); Tehran, Iran
- Origin: Iran
- Occupations: Composer, performing musician
- Instruments: Piano, violin, santur

Houman Dehlavi (Persian: هومن دهلوی; born 8 July 1971) is an Iranian musician and composer.

== Biography ==
Houman Dehlavi was born in 1971 in Tehran. He learned to play the santur from his mother, Susan Aslani, when he was a child. At the age of ten, he practiced playing the piano for five years with Farman Behboud. Meanwhile, along with his sister Haleh Dehlavi, he also learned to play the violin with musicians such as Manouchehr Ansari, Partow Pourafar, Behrouz Vahidiyeh Azar, and Siavash Zahir al-Dini. He first learned the fundamentals of music from his father Hossein Dehlavi and later with musicians such as Parviz Mansouri and Ahmad Pejman. After he finished high school with a graphics diploma from Tehran School of Visual Arts in 1993 and with the establishment of classical music courses in Azad University he started his major in playing the piano and benefited from the training of Rafael Minaskanian and Chista Gharib. As he was studying at the university, he started teaching music as well as composing music for theaters, and also attended open music courses by musicians such as Emanuel Malik Aslanian and Mehran Rouhani. He also benefited from the training of Thomas Christian David by participating in a master's course in music composition and conducting. Ardeshir Rouhani and Golriz Hashemi are also among his teachers.

In 1998, with the establishment of the first postgraduate course of music composition in Iran, having gained the first place in the national university entrance exam, he entered Tehran University of Art. Under the supervision of Ahmad Pejman, he presented his master's thesis in music composition, including a work of four movements based on Iranian melodies for the symphonic orchestra. Then he was a lecturer at the University of Arts in 2000, as he graduated.

Houman Dehlavi travelled to countries such as Austria, Slovakia, Canada, and the U.S. for further music experiences and collaborated with other musicians in composing, arrangement, recording and performances. He chose the U.S. and Iran to live in and by establishing an orchestra, he performed Iranian music in the United States. He also participated in National Festival of Youth Music and was a member of jury in University of Arts Music Festival.

== Artworks ==
Some of Houman Dehlavi's works:

- The music album "Lights and Shadows" composed and played by Houman Dehlavi on piano, played by Kourosh Babaei on the Shahkaman, mixed and mastered by Sadegh Nouri, and graphic designed by Mohammad Shahidi, 2025
- The music album "Seven Skies" composed by Houman Dehlavi in the form of nineteen pieces for piano played by Houman Dehlavi, Vafa Vaghefi, and Kasra Faridi, 2025
- The book Three Pieces by Hosein Dehlavi, arrangement for piano by Houman Dehlavi
- The book Seven Skies, 18 pieces for piano
- Music album Days of Not Being, vocalist Salar Aghili
- Daaman Keshan (based on the melody of Saari Galin), vocalist Bijan Bijani
- Symphonic Movement, for symphonic orchestra
- Fantasy, for Qanun and Orchestra
- Dream of the plain, for ney, harp and string orchestra
- Arrangement and conducting Ragse Irani, composed by Mahin Zarinpanjeh
- Dream, for piano
- Lullabies, for piano
- Adobe and Alas
- Music for Without Farewell (play), directed by Katayoun Feyz Marandi
- Music for Notebook (play), directed by Katayoun Feyz Marandi
- Music for Window (play), directed by Jaleh MohammadAli
- Music for Mother (play), directed by Shahrzad Abdehagh
