= The Searchers (TV series) =

2009 Iranian TV series

- جست‌وجوگران
- Created by: Mohammad Ali Sadjadi
- Starring: Masoud Rayegan; Payam Dehkordi; Masoumeh Mir-Hosseini; Reza Babak; Farahnaz Manafi Zaher; Reza Kianian
- Country of origin: Iran
- No. of episodes: 14

Production
- Running time: 45 minutes

Original release
- Network: IRIB 2 (Iran)
- Release: November 25, 2009 – present

The Searchers (Persian: جست‌وجوگران Persian pronunciation: [dʒostodʒuːɡæraːn]) is an Iranian TV series broadcast in 2009. It is written and directed by Mohammad Ali Sadjadi. The theme of the series is about two Inspectors from Iran's General inspection Organization (Persian:سازمان بازرسی کل کشور) searching for economic crimes and corruptions among Iranian corporations and manufacturers. The series is produced episodically. It is on Iranian TV every Wednesday.

== The cast ==
- Masoud Rayegan as Inspector Ata Bahrami. The main character of the series, an experienced inspector at the organization that solves financial crime files. He usually smokes and is of Lori origin.
- Payam Dehkordi as Inspector Majid Moghaddam. A former police officer of the Mazandarani origin. His character is a person too much interested in eating while working. He's Ata Bahrami's assistant.
- Masoumeh Mir-Hosseini as Pari Shakeri - A specialist working in organization for Signature and handwriting recognition. She sometimes receives some inspirations, e.g. in episode 6 she was inspired the bad happening to Maj. Rahimi.
- Reza Babak as Ebadi

=== Guest actors ===
- Reza Kianian as Haji AbediZadeh (in episode 5)
- Pantea Bahram as Mrs. Soodabeh Fazli (in episode 6)- The secretary of Mr. Sabeti.
- Reza Fayazi
