= Payam Dehkordi =

Iranian actor

- پیام دهکردی
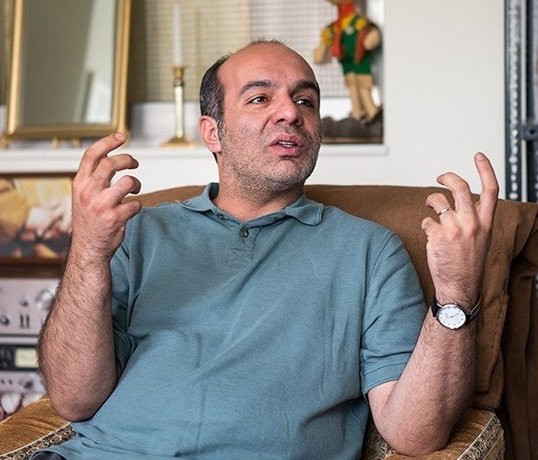
- Dehkordi in 2015
- Born: Payam Naderi Dehkordi; 10 May 1977 (age 49); Shahrekord, Chaharmahal and Bakhtiari, Iran
- Occupations: Actor; theater director
- Years active: 1994–present
- Spouse: Arefeh Lak
- Children: 1

Payam Naderi Dehkordi (Persian: پیام نادری دهکردی; born 10 May 1977) is an Iranian actor and theater director. He is best known for his role as Michael Hashemian in Gando (2019–2021).

== Filmography ==
=== Film ===
| Year | Title | Role | Director |
|---|---|---|---|
| 2004 | A Piece of Bread | | Kamal Tabrizi |
| 2004 | In The Nearby | | Rama Ghavidel |
| 2005 | A Little Kiss | | Bahman Farmanara |
| 2008 | There's Always A Woman In Between | | Kamal Tabrizi |
| 2011 | The Maritime Silk Road | Mardas | Mohammad Bozorgnia |
| 2011 | Pickup on South Street | | Siavash Asadi |
| 2011 | One 2 One | Hassan | Mania Akbari |
| 2011 | This Road Is Two-Way | | Yalda Jebeli |
| 2012 | Current Treasure | | Amin Aslani |
| 2012 | Without Farewell | Sadraie | Ahmad Amini |
| 2012 | Scratch | | Mohammad Hamzei |
| 2013 | Tragedy | Ahadi | Azita Moguie |
| 2014 | I Want to Dance | Dr. Esfandiari | Bahman Farmanara |
| 2014 | Hail And Sun | Vaseghi | Reza Karimi |
| 2014 | Radio Abadan | | Hamidreza Honari |
| 2016 | The Cancer Period | Payam | Hossein Shahabi |
| 2018 | Alien | | Masoud Abparvar |
| 2019 | Ballad of Bahram or Belief In The Power of The Image | | Farshid Gholipour |
| 2020 | Third Eye | Farzad Shamimi | Reza Dadoie |

=== Web ===
| Year | Title | Role | Director | Platform |
|---|---|---|---|---|
| 2021–2022 | Once Upon a Time in Iran | Nazar Beyg | Tina Pakravan | Namava |
| TBA | Vertigo | | Behrang Tofighi | Namava |

=== Television ===
| Year | Title | Role | Director | Network |
|---|---|---|---|---|
| 2003 | Crystal Garden | | Rambod Javan | IRIB TV3 |
| 2007 | Shahriar | Abolghasem Shiva | Kamal Tabrizi | IRIB TV2 |
| 2007 | Zero Degree Turn | Sardar Ehtesham | Hassan Fathi | IRIB TV1 |
| 2009 | The Searchers | Majid Moghaddam | Mohammad Ali Sadjadi | IRIB TV2 |
| 2009 | The Safe | Jamshid Azarnoosh | Maziar Miri | IRIB TV3 |
| 2012 | The Long Way | Daei | Reza Karimi | IRIB TV1 |
| 2013 | Black Intelligence | Ahad | Masoud Abparvar | IRIB TV3 |
| 2014 | Transition From Suffering | Hedayat | Fereidoun Hassanpour | IRIB TV1 |
| 2018 | Koobar | Ahmadali | Fereidoun Hassanpour | IRIB TV2 |
| 2019–2021 | Gando | Michael Hashemian | Javad Afshar | IRIB TV3 |
| 2021 | Maple | Afrasiab Mamani | Behrang Tofighi | IRIB TV1 |
| 2021 | The Neighbor | Farrokh | Mohammad Hossein Ghazanfari | IRIB TV3 |
| TBA | Divorce | | Abolqasem Talebi | |

== Theater ==
- The Death of A Salesman - dir. Nader Borhani Marand
- Rhinocéros - dir. Vahid Rahbani
- Romulus The Great - dir. Nader Borhani Marand
