= Smell of Camphor, Scent of Jasmine =

Smell of Camphor, Fragrance of Jasmine
- Directed by: Bahman Farmanara
- Written by: Bahman Farmanara
- Produced by: Morteza Shayesteh, Fazlollah Yousefpour
- Starring: Bahman Farmanara, Roya Nonahali, Firouz Behjat-Mohamadi, Hossien Kasbian, Reza Kianian, Parivash Nazarieh, Mahtaj Nojoomi, Valiyollah Shirandami
- Music by: Ahmad Pejman
- Release date: 2000
- Running time: 93 minutes
- Language: Persian

Smell of Camphor, Fragrance of Jasmine, or Booye Kafoor, Atre Yas (Persian: بوی کافور، عطر ياس), is an Iranian film written by, directed by and starring Bahman Farmanara, released in 2000. The film is a comedy with fantasy sequences about a filmmaker similar to himself. It was Farmanara's first contribution to Iranian cinema in two decades.

== Plot ==
The protagonist, a film director named Bahman Farjami, is coming to terms with aging. He grieves for his wife, lost five years prior. He seeks to make a documentary about death, dying and the grieving process, or so he tells his friends.

== Quotes ==
- When a filmmaker doesn't make films, that is death." -- Bahman
