= Mana and Mani =

Mana and Mani (Persian: مانا و مانی) is an opera for children written by Hossein Dehlavi in 1979 as his contribution to the Year of the Child (1979) and UNICEF's request.

The opera was written in 20 sections and 520 pages, but it was not performed at that time because of the Iranian Revolution.

The orchestral part of Mana and Mani was recorded by Ali Rahbari in Bratislava in 2005. This performance did not include the vocal/choral sections. In 2012 the opera was performed in Iran more completely by 250 people led by Alireza Shafaghi Nejad and directed by Mohammad Aghebati and cooperating Naser Nazar and Pars music group. Hossein Dehlavi in a 2013 interview with Khabar Online said "The authorities ask me to change the woman solo lines in the opera but it is not possible as this opera is based on that."
