= A Little Kiss (film) =

- Persian: یک بوس کوچولو
- Directed by: Bahman Farmanara
- Written by: Bahman Farmanara
- Produced by: Alireza Shoja Nouri; Production Manager: Shahriar Shahbaz Zadeh
- Starring: Reza Kianian; Jamshid Mashayekhi; Hushang Harirchiyan; Hedieh Tehrani; Jamshid Hashempour; Fatemeh Motamed-Arya; Fakhri Khorvash; Babak Hamidian; Payam Dehkordi
- Cinematography: Mahmoud Kalari
- Edited by: Abbas Ganjavi
- Music by: Ahmad Pejman
- Distributed by: Namayeshgaran
- Release date: 14 September 2005
- Running time: 100 minutes
- Country: Iran
- Language: Persian

A Little Kiss (Persian: یک بوس کوچولو) is a 2005 Iranian drama film directed by Bahman Farmanara.

== Plot ==
A writer returns to Iran after many years and goes to the house of another friend who is also a writer. They start a trip to several cities in Iran...

== Cast ==
- Reza Kianian
- Jamshid Mashayekhi
- Hushang Harirchiyan
- Hedieh Tehrani
- Jamshid Hashempour
- Fatemeh Motamed-Arya
- Fakhri Khorvash
- Babak Hamidian
- Payam Dehkordi
- Maryam Saadat
- Hossein Kasbian
- Ahmad Saatchian
- Hedayat Hashemi
- Mehdi Safavi
