= Gando (TV series) =

Iranian TV series

- Persian: گاندو
- Genre: Spy; Crime; Action; Thriller
- Written by: Arash Ghaderi
- Directed by: Javad Afshar
- Starring: Vahid Rahbani; Dariush Farhang; Payam Dehkordi; Farhad Ghaemian; Majid Norouzi; Pendar Akbari; Ali Afshar; Erfan Ebrahimi; Ashkan Delavari
- Country of origin: Iran
- Original language: Persian
- No. of seasons: 2
- No. of episodes: 67

Production
- Producer: Mojtaba Amini
- Production location: Iran Turkey China
- Cinematography: Farshad Golsfidi
- Editor: Seyyed Hamed Mohsenpour
- Running time: 45 minutes

Original release
- Network: Islamic Republic of Iran Broadcasting
- Release: June 5, 2019 – September 5, 2021

Gando (Persian: گاندو, romanized: Gando) is a spy thriller Iranian TV series directed by Javad Afshar and written by Arash Ghaderi. The first episode was broadcast on June 15, 2019, on the state network IRIB TV3. The series is about the Iranian security police and solving the security case called Gando and the adventures that take place during this case.

== Story ==
From ISNA, according to the author of the series, in general, 80 percent of the story, apart from the narrative of Michael Hashemian and Jason Rezaian, was his imagination.

This isn't true that 80 percent of the text was not real, said Arash Ghaderi, author of the series, during the Gando press conference. He expressed our work was based on a real case, but we needed a story for drama and storytelling. We had some real cases that we had to connect with each other through stories.

== Series title ==
The serial's name is derived from the Balochi word for Mugger crocodile, a freshwater crocodile whose habitat extends from the Indian subcontinent to Southern Iran.

== Cast ==
Actor	Character	Notes
Vahid Rahbani	Mohammad	
Dariush Farhang	Amir Hossein Abdi	
Majid Norouzi	Rasoul Hasani	
Pendar Akbari	Saeed Shahriari	
Erfan Ebrahimi	Amir Bahadori	
Ali Afshar	Davoud	
Payam Dehkordi	Michael Hashemian	Jason Rezaian
Mohammad Reza Sharifinia	Behrooz Kazemi	
Leila Otadi	Fahimi	
Azita Torkashvand	Goli Sabeti	
Sara Khoeniha	Marjan Sharafi	
Farhad Ghaemian	Saed Bahrami	
Aliram Nourai	Farhad Haghi / Mehran Arabi	
Khosrow Shahraz	Shahidi	
Negar Abedi	Soraya Masoudi	
Niloufar Shahidi	Sima Azizi	
Sogol Tahmasebi	Atie	
Reza Tavakoli	Dr. Farmand	
Nasrin Nakisa	Aziz	Mohammad's Mom
Kambiz Dirbaz	Mohsen	
Saleh Mirza Aghai	Aydin Sotoudeh	
Seyyed Mehrdad Ziae	Farshid Riazi	
Kamand Amirsoleimani	Mahta Soltan Abadi	
Atabak Naderi	Doctor	
Jamshid Jahanza	Ebrahim Sherbaf	
Javad Taheri	Esmaili	
Behzad Rahimkhani	Sohrab Kashani	
Rabeh Oskouie		
Alireza Nematollahi		
Shahrzad Kamalzadeh	Sadia Amer	
Shahram Ghaedi	Mohammad Ali Moosapour	
Mohammad Mokhtari	Ebrahim Sharif	
Amir-Yal Arjmand	Saed Amer	
Sogol Tahmasebi	Atieh	
Nasrin Nakisa	Aziz	
Shahed Ahmadloo	Mohsen Kolahi	
Khosro Shahraz	Ali Shahidi	

== Reception ==
=== Awards and nominations ===
Year	Award	Category	Recipient	Result	Ref.
2020	20th Hafez Awards	Best Television Series	Gando	Nominated	
2020	20th Hafez Awards	Best Director – Television Series	Javad Afshar	Nominated	
2021	21st Hafez Awards	Best Television Series	Gando	Nominated	
2021	21st Hafez Awards	Best Director – Television Series	Javad Afshar	Nominated	
2021	21st Hafez Awards	Best Original Song	"Hug Me" (Mohammad Alizadeh, Mehrzad Amirkhani, Moein Tayebi)	Nominated	

=== Rating ===
According to Islamic republic of Iran broadcasting, a poll conducted on July 11 from all over the country that shows 80.5% of the people have watched the programs of television, among them, the TV series Gando recorded 44% of the rating.
