= The English Briefcase (TV series) =

- Created by: Ziaeddin Dorri
- Starring: Ali Mosaffa; Leila Hatami; Reza Kianian; Sirus Gorjestani; Farhad Aslani; Saba Kamali; Ghotbeddin Sadeghi; Fatemeh Nouri; Hesam Navab safavi Peiman Shariati; Farshid Ebrahimian; Jafar Bozorgi; Abdollah Esfandyari; Mansour Valamagham; Mohammad-Reza Sharifinia; Mehdi Taghinia
- Composers: Mosio Lumer; Farhad Fakhreddini
- Country of origin: Iran
- Original language: Persian
- No. of episodes: (list of episodes)

Production
- Running time: 40 minutes

Original release
- Network: Channel 1 (Iran)
- Release: 2000 – 2000

The English Briefcase is an Iranian television series produced in 2000 and directed by Ziaeddin Dorri.

== Plot ==
The story dates back to 70 years ago, and is about a man called Dr Mansour Adiban who went back from France to Iran after his studies finished, and runs a weekly called Iran-e Azad ("Free Iran"). He took part in senate's election but there was no chance for him due to corruption. The second time, he enjoys the support of a girl from a rich and well-connected family, called Mastaneh who loves Iran and wants it to be free, too. Despite the fact that Mansoor is married, Mastaneh is in love with him, but he's too busy with politics to notice that.
