= Hossein Nassehi =

Hossein Nassehi (Persian: حسین ناصحی) was a Persian composer and trombone player.

== Biography ==
Nassehi was born in Tehran and studied Trombone at the Tehran Conservatory and composition at the Ankara State Conservatory. For many years he was a professor at the Tehran Conservatory; Hossein Dehlavi, Ahmad Pejman and Parviz Mansouri were among his pupils.

Most of Nassehi's works were never performed in Iran during the time of the Shah due to his political activities. He died of a heart attack in Tehran in 1977.

Nassehi's son Fereydoun is a pianist, and his daughter Nasrin is a member of the Tehran Symphony choir.

== Works ==
- "Dance at the Court of King Samangan" (for soprano & orchestra)
- "Shour" for cello and piano
- "Hermaan" for voice and piano
- "String Quartet in E Minor"
