= A House Built on Water =

2001 Iranian film

- Directed by: Bahman Farmanara
- Written by: Bahman Farmanara
- Produced by: Bahman Farmanara
- Starring: Reza Kianian; Hedieh Tehrani; Ezzatolah Entezami; Jamshid Mashayekhi; Bita Farrahi; Behnaz Jafari
- Cinematography: Mahmoud Kalari
- Edited by: Abbas Ganjavi
- Music by: Ahmad Pejman
- Release date: 31 March 2003 (Iran)
- Running time: 111 minutes
- Country: Iran
- Language: Persian

A House Built on Water (Persian: خانه‌ای روی آب) is a 2001 Iranian film written, produced and directed by Bahman Farman-Ara. Starring Reza Kianian, Hedieh Tehrani, Ezzatolah Entezami, Jamshid Mashayekhi, Bita Farrahi and Behnaz Jafari.

== Plot ==
At the beginning of the film, the main character injures a young angel with his car in an accident on a road. The viewers understand from the start that the film deals with surrealism and mystic work. However, there is not much of this; more than 90% of the film reflects only touchable realities. The protagonist, Dr. Sepid-bakht (literary: blank-future, good-fortune, or good-end), a middle-aged gynaecologist, has good, no-good and bad attributes – as do most humans. Sepid-bakht, having made many mistakes in the past and being lonely now, accidentally becomes acquainted with an eight-year-old boy who knows the entire text of the Quran by heart and suddenly goes in coma. This is perhaps why the first name of the film was Coma and why Farman-Ara described the future film as "the history of society in collective coma" in an interview.

The doctor, who now experiences "free fall in the life", for instance, caused infertility to his secretary-love in the past, who no way pardons him because of what he did to her when she was even younger. Among the social problems the film exhibits are narcotism of youngsters, prostitution and AIDS. Somewhere in the film, the doctor responds to someone who just called him his last hope with "(So) We are in a shit world, when I am someone's last hope." Western film critics already compared some socio-satirical attributes of the films of Farman-Ara with those of Woody Allen.

The doctor still sympathizes with his ex-beloved, who now is a head-nurse and must undergo chemotherapy because of a severe disease; with a young girl, who recently learned that she has AIDS; and with his son, who has an addiction to narcotic drugs.

This film of Farman-Ara was well received by the judges of the International Fajr Film-Festival of Tehran (2002) and won many prizes, i.e. as the best Iranian film and because of the best actor (Reza Kianian).

== Cast ==
- Dr. Sepid-bakht: Reza Kianian
- Doctor's father: Ezzat-ol-lah Entezami
- Doctor's son, Mani: Mehdi Safavi
- Doctor's secretary: Hedye Tehrani
- Doctor Latifi: Jamshid Mashayekhi
- Head-nurse: Bita Farrahi
- Girl with AIDS: Behnaz Jafari
- Mrs Mohammadi: Roya Nonahali
