= Sara Khoeniha =

Iranian actress (born 1975)

- سارا خوئینی‌ها
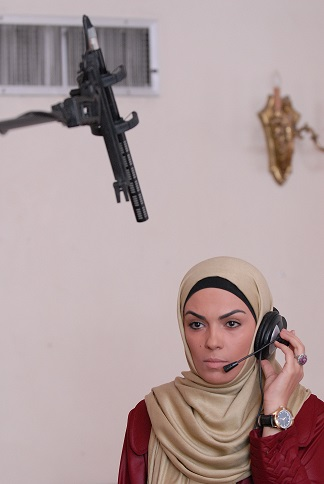
- Born: Sara Khoeniha; May 24, 1975 (age 50); Tehran, Iran
- Occupations: TV and cinema actress
- Years active: 1990-present

Sara Khoeniha (Persian: سارا خوئینی‌ها; also Romanized as "Sara Khoeiniha"; born 1975 in Tehran) is an Iranian actress. She also acted by the name "Sara Vosoughi". She graduated from University of Tehran in the field Graphics.

== Life ==
She is the ex-wife to "Changiz Vosoughi", and used the name "Sara Vosoughi" in her first two years of acting. In 1990, she had her first acting experience along with her husband in the film "Bloody Morning", and also 3 other movies still by the name "Sara Vosoughi". Her marriage lasted for two years. A few years later, she once again started acting, this time by her own name, in the movie "Friends" directed by "Ali Shah Hatami". She has been praised for her works and received awards.

== Filmography ==
- 2019: Gando
- 2018: Mission Impossible
- 2015: Aspirin
- 2011: Yeki az ma do nafar
- 2010: Bidari-e Royaha
- 2009: Superstar
- 2008: Invitation
- 2006: Gis Borideh
- 2002: Masoomiyat Az Dast Rafte (TV series)
- 2000: Doostan
- 1992: Flowers and bullets (as Sara Vossoughi)
