= The Maritime Silk Road (film) =

2011 Iranian film

Maritime Silk Road
- Directed by: Mohammad Bozorgnia
- Written by: Mohammad Bozorgnia
- Produced by: Hasan Beshkofeh
- Starring: Dariush Arjmand; Reza Kianian; Ezzatollah Entezami; Bahram Radan; Payam Dehkordi
- Cinematography: Bahram Badakhshani
- Music by: Chan Kwong-wing
- Distributed by: Farabi Cinematic Foundation
- Release date: February 20, 2011
- Running time: 120 minutes
- Country: Iran
- Language: Persian
- Budget: $8-10 million USD

Maritime Silk Road (Persian: راه آبی ابريشم) is a 2011 Iranian film about a man called Soleiman Siraf who, according to historical documents, was the first sailor to cross the Indian Ocean to China. His route was then called the Maritime Silk Road and many merchants took that route to get their merchandise to China. One of the passengers in this film is a young man named Shazan Ibn Yusof who keeps a log of the voyage. The Maritime Silk Road started in The Persian Gulf and continued into India, Thailand and China. Shooting for some scenes in the film took place in Kanchanaburi, Thailand and used elephants from the Taweechai Elephant Camp.

== Cast ==
- Dariush Arjmand as Soleiman Siraf
- Reza Kianian as Edris
- Bahram Radan as Shazan
- Ezzatollah Entezami as Slaver
- Pegah Ahangarani as Mahoora
- Payam Dehkordi as Mardas

== Awards ==
- Crystal Simorgh National Best Film - 29th Fajr International Film Festival 2011
- Crystal Simorgh Best Special Effects - 29th Fajr International Film Festival 2011
- Crystal Simorgh Best Cinematography - 29th Fajr International Film Festival 2011
- The Silver Sword Best Film - International Historical And Military Films Festival 2013

== See also ==
- Silk Road
