= Reza Kianian =

Iranian actor (born 1951)

- رضا کیانیان
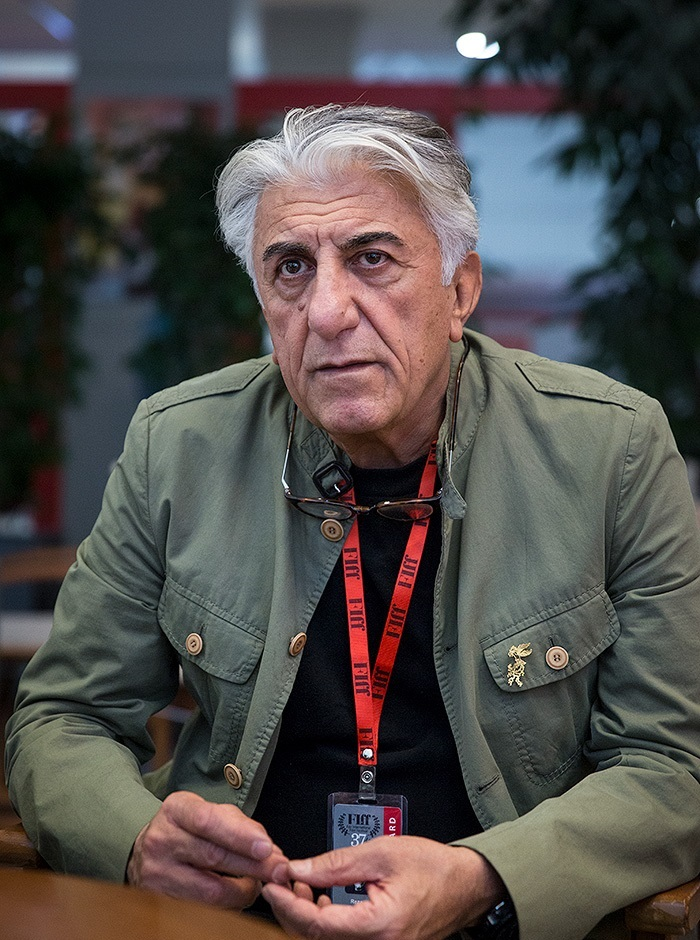
- Kianian at the 37th Fajr International Film Festival, February 2019
- Born: June 19, 1951 (age 75); Tehran, Iran
- Occupations: Writer; actor
- Years active: 1965–present
- Spouse: Hayedeh Qarachedaghi (m. 2000)

Reza Kianian (Persian: رضا کیانیان, born June 19, 1951, in Tehran) is an Iranian actor. He has received various accolades, including two Crystal Simorgh, a Hafez Award and two Iran Cinema Celebration Awards.

== Early life ==
Kianian is the second child of a family of 9; he has 4 brothers and 2 sisters. When he was 1 year old, his family moved to Mashhad. His first acting coach was his older brother, Davood. In 1965, Davood directed and coached Reza in his first role in a play titled Az Paa Nayoftadeha, written by Gholam-Hossein Sa'edi. He continued to work with Davood's theater troupe for the next 3 years, when he moved back to Tehran to study fine arts at the University of Tehran, where he graduated in 1976. Reza Kianian married his wife, Hayedeh, on March 21 (the Persian New Year) in 1983.

== Career ==
=== Theater ===
Kianian starting his acting career in theater. He began acting in 1965, when he was only 15 years old. Later on in life, he took the stage in renditions of plays such as Antigone, Petty Bourgeois, Simon Masha Figures, Mississippi's Marriage, Souvenir of the Sand Years and many more. In April 2010, after a six-year hiatus from theater, Kianian returned to stage under the direction of Atila Pesyani in Professor Bvbvs.

=== Television ===
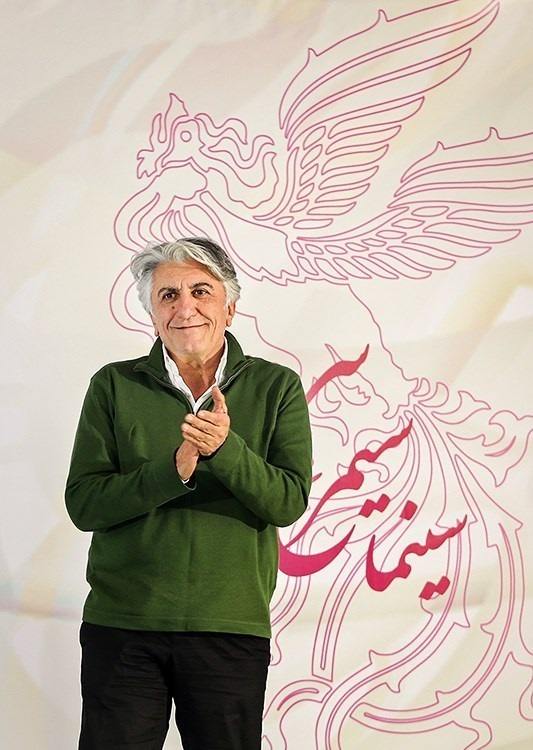
Kianian in Fajr Film Festival, 8 February 2016

Reza Kianian has acted in some television series as well. Perhaps his most memorable role in television has been his character 'Jamshid' in Shellike Nahayi (The Final Shot) directed by Mohsen Shahmohammadi, where 'Jamshid-style' outfits and hairstyle became popular with the youth of Iran. In The English Bag and The Rebel Years he portrayed an old clergyman and a judge respectively, which are considered his most controversial roles to date.

== Other ventures ==
Besides being an actor, Reza Kianian is also a painter, sculptor and set designer. His set design for the movie Niloofar-e Abi (The Lotus) won him an industry award at the 17th Fajr International Film Festival in 1998. Kianian's photo and paintings have been exhibited in two solo exhibits in 2008 and 2010, and in over five group exhibits. In 2007, he also held a solo sculptor exhibit. In 2012, Reza Kianian was the auctioneer for the first ever Christie's style auction in Tehran, Tehran Auction. The auction was a sold-out event, making over $1 million.

== Personal life ==
On 2 February 2026, Kianian was not present for the screening of Escort at the Fajr Film Festival, a movie in which he acted in, leading to speculations that he had boycotted the festival in protest of the government's handling of the 2025–2026 Iranian protests.

== Filmography ==
=== Television ===
- Apartment, directed by Asghar Hashemi, 1994
- Shellike Nahayi (The Final Shot), directed by Mohsen Shahmohammadi, 1996
- The English Bag, directed by Ziaeddin Dorri, 2000
- Doran-e Sarkeshi (The Rebel Years), directed by Kamal Tabrizi, 2002
- Yek Mosht Par-e Oghab (A Fistful of Eagle Feathers), directed by Asghar Hashemi, 2007–2008
- Roozegar-e Gharib (Strange Times), directed by Kianoush Ayyari, 2002–2008
- Mokhtarnameh directed by Davoud Mirbagheri, 2004–2008
- Ghalb-e Yakhi (Frozen Heart), directed by Saman Moghadam, 2012
- Rahe Toolani (Long Way), directed by Reza Mir-Karimi, 2012
- Kolah Pahlavi (Pahlavi Hat), directed by Ziaeddin Dorri, 2013
- King of Ear, directed by Davood Mir Bagheri, 2013
- Puzzle, directed by Ebrahim Sheibani, 2014
- Shahrzad, directed by Hassan Fathi, 2018
- Siavash, directed by Soroush Mohammadzadeh, 2021

=== Film ===
- All of Earth's Temptations (Tamam-e vasvaseha-ye zamin), directed by Hamid Samandarian, 1989
- Patal and Small Dreams (Patal va Arezoohaye Koochak), directed by Masoud Karamati, 1989
- Ilya, the Young Painter (Ilya, Naghash-e Javan), directed by Abolhassan Davoodi, 1991
- The Unfinished Man (Mard-e Natamam), directed by Moharram Zienalzadeh, 1992
- Common Pain (Dard-e Moshtarek), directed by Yasaman Malek Nasr, 1994
- Kimia, directed by Ahmad Reza Darvish, 1995
- My Mother, Gisoo (Madaram, Gisoo), directed by Siamak Shayeghi, 1995
- Sultan (Soltan), directed by Masoud Kimiai, 1996
- Cinema is Cinema (Cinema, Cinemast), directed by Ziaeddin Dorri, 1996
- The Red Ribbon (Rooban-e Ghermez), directed by Ebrahim Hatamikia, 1998
- The Glass Agency (Ajans-e Shisheh-i), directed by Ebrahim Hatamikia, 1998
- Smell of Camphor, Scent of Jasmine (Booye Kafoor, Atre Yas), directed by Bahman Farmanara, 2000
- An Umbrella for Two (Chatri Baray-e Do Nafar), directed by Ahmad Amini, 2000
- Killing Mad Dogs (Sag Koshi), directed by Bahram Beizai, 2001
- Issa Will Come (Issa Miayad), directed by Ali Zhekan, 2001
- Romshekan's Wedding (Aroosiye Romshekan), directed by Naser Gholamrezaei, 2001
- A House Built on Water (Khaneye Rooy-e Ab), directed by Bahman Farmanara, 2001
- Look At the Sky Sometimes (Gahi Be Aseman Negah Kon), directed by Kamal Tabrizi, 2003
- The Wind Carpet (Kaze no jûtan) or Farshe Bad, directed by Kamal Tabrizi, 2003
- Open Vote (Ra'i baz), directed by Mehdi Noorbakhsh, 2003
- Foothold (Ghadamgah), directed by Mohammad Mehdi Asgarpour, 2004
- A Piece of Bread (Yek Teke Nan), directed by Kamal Tabrizi, 2005
- A Little Kiss (Yek boos-e Koochooloo), directed by Bahman Farmanara, 2005
- The Fish Fall in Love (Mahiha Ashegh Mishavand), directed by Ali Rafie, 2005

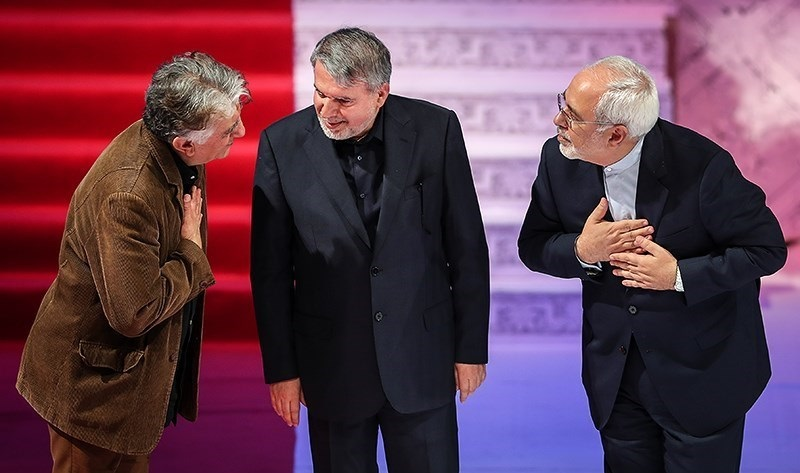
Kianian with Mohammad Javad Zarif at Closing ceremony of 35th Fajr International Film Festival

- Zagross, directed by Mohammad Ali Najafi, 2005
- Bagh Ferdows, 5PM (Bagh Ferdows, Panj-e Bad Az Zohr), directed by Siamak Shayeghi, 2005
- The Horse (Asb), directed by Babak Mohammadi, 2005
- Men at Work (Kargaran Mashghool-e Karand), directed by Mani Haghighi, 2006
- Three Women (Se Zan), directed by Manijeh Hekmat, 2006
- There is Always a Woman Involved (Hamishe Paye Yek Zan Dar Mian Ast), directed by Kamal Tabrizi, 2007
- Sad Saal Beh In Salha (English Title: Miss Iran), directed by Saman Moghadam, 2007
- Familiar Territory (Khake Ashena), directed by Bahman Farmanara, 2008
- 7:05, directed by Mohammad Mehdi Asgarpour, 2008
- Plot 88 (Ghat-eye 88), directed by Rahman Haghighi, 2008
- Voices (Sedaha), directed by Farzad Motamen, 2008
- Three Women directed by Manijeh Hekmat
- The Sting and the Bee (Nish O Zanboor), directed by Hamid Reza Salahmand, 2009
- Reports from a Party (Gozaresh-e Yek Jashn), directed by Ebrahim Hatamikia, 2010
- A Cube of Sugar (Ye habe ghand), directed by Seyyed Reza Mir-Karimi, 2010
- The Maritime Silk Road (Rah-e Abi Abrisham), directed by Mohammad Bozorgnia, 2012
- Laboratory (Azmayeshgah), directed by Hamid Amjad, 2012
- Migraine (Migren), directed by Maneli Shojaee Fard, 2012
- Miss Iran (Saad Saal Be In Salha), directed by Saman Moghadam, 2012
- No Where No Body (Hich Koja Hich Kas), directed by Ebrahim Sheibani, 2013
- I Want to Dance (Delam Mikhad), directed by Bahman Farmanara, 2014
- There are no Particular News (Khabar e Khasi Nist), directed by Mostafa Shayesteh, 2014
- Barcode (Barcode), directed by Mostafa Kiayee, 2016
- Where Are My Shoes? (Kafshhayam Koo?), directed by Kiumars Pourahmad, 2016
- After the Incident (Bad az Etefagh), directed by Pouria Heidary Oureh, 2020

== Bibliography ==
Reza Kianian is the author of 9 books in Iran.

- Sevoomin Sarneveshte Davoud (Davoud's Third Destiny)
- Bazigari (Acting)
- Tahlil-e Bazigari (Analyzing Acting)
- Sho'bade-ye Bazgari (Magic of Acting)
- Bazigari Dar Ghab (Acting in Frame)
- Naser o Fardin (Naser and Fardin)
- Aks haye Tanhaee (Images of Loneliness)
- In Mardom-e Nazanin (These Lovely People)
- Ghaar-e Sevom (The Third Cave)

== Awards and nominations ==
- Nominated Crystal Simorgh for Best Supporting Actor 13th Fajr International Film Festival
- Winner Crystal Simorgh for Best Supporting Actor 16th Fajr International Film Festival
- Winner Crystal Simorgh for Best Actor 20th Fajr International Film Festival
- Winner Golden Statue House of Cinema for Best Actor 2003
- Nominated Crystal Simorgh for Best Actor 21st Fajr International Film Festival
- Winner Golden Bred for Best Actor 21st Fajr International Film Festival
- Winner Golden Statue House of Cinema for Best Actor 2005
- Nominated Crystal Simorgh for Best Actor 23rd Fajr International Film Festival
- Nominated Golden Statue House of Cinema for Best Supporting Actor 2008
- Jury Award International Film Festival of Kerala 2008
- Hafez Award for a lifetime artistic Activity 2008
- Named one of top five most important actors in history of Iranian cinema by the critics and panel of the Film Monthly Magazine
- Nominated Crystal Simorgh for Best Actor 34th Fajr International Film Festival
