= Hossein Dehlavi =

Iranian composer (1927–2019)

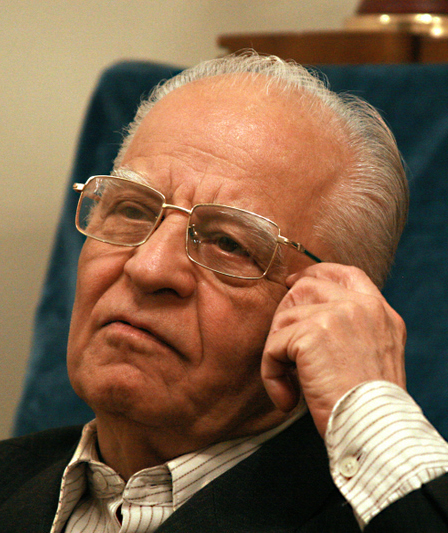

Background information
- Born: September 30, 1927; Tehran, Persia (now Iran)
- Died: October 15, 2019 (aged 92) Tehran, Iran
- Occupations: Professor of composition, conductor
- Years active: 1948–2019

Hossein Dehlavi (Persian: حسین دهلوی) (September 30, 1927 – October 15, 2019) was an Iranian composer.

== Biography ==
Hossein Dehlavi was born in 1927 in Tehran, Iran and started music with his father Moezeddin Emami who was a pupil of master Ali-Akbar Shahnazi. Dehlavi studied composition at the Tehran Conservatory of Music with Hossein Nassehi and Heimo Tauber. He studied Persian music with Abolhasan Saba and, from 1957 to 1967, was the principal conductor of the Persian Fine Arts Administration Orchestra, also known as Saba Orchestra.

Dehlavi began teaching at the Persian National Music Conservatory in Tehran from 1957 and served as its director from 1962 until 1971. The conductor Ali Rahbari was one of his pupils. In 1992, with the cooperation of nearly 70 players of Persian instruments, Dehlavi established the Plectrum Orchestra in Tehran.

Concertino for Santur and Orchestra, by Hossein Dehlavi and Faramarz Payvar.

His works included several pieces for Persian instruments and orchestra, voice and orchestra, choir and orchestra, and two operas and a ballet. As his contribution to UNESCO's International Year of the Child (1979), he wrote an opera for children called Mana and Mani.

His wife Susan Aslani and his son Houman Dehlavi are also famous musicians.

== Selected Compositions ==
Chamber Works

- Duo for Santur, 1953
- Plectrum Quartet (Chahar-Navazi-e Mezrabi), 1964

Orchestral Works

- Sabolkbal (Breezy), 1953
- Shushtari, for violin and orchestra, based on a piece by Abolhassan Saba, 1958.
- Concertino for Santur & Orchestra (with Faramarz Payvar), 1958
- Forugh-e Eshgh (Blaze of Love) - 1963
- Sarbaz (Soldier) with choir, 1966.

Opera

- Khosrow and Shirin (based on a romance by the 12th-century Persian poet Nizami Ganjavi, 1970.
- Mana and Mani (for children), 1979.

Ballet

- Bijan & Manijeh ballet (inspired from the National epic of Persia Shahnameh by Ferdowsi) - premiered at Tehran's Rudaki Hall in 1975

== Death ==
On October 15, 2019, Dehlavi died at his home in Tehran after years of battling Alzheimer's disease.

== See also ==
- Music of Iran
- List of Iranian musicians
