= Bijan Bijani =

Iranian singer (born 1953)

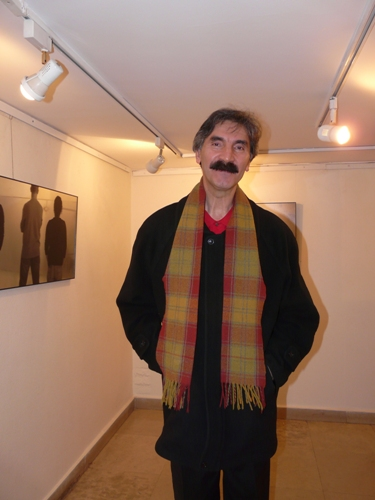

Background information
- Born: 24 May 1953 (age 72); Babol, Iran
- Genres: Persian traditional music
- Occupation: Singer
- Years active: 1988–present

Bijan Bijani (Persian: بیژن بیژنی, born May 24, 1953) is an Iranian singer and calligrapher. His most famous work is the song "The Concealment of the Heart".

== Biography ==
Bijan Bijani was born on May 24, 1953, in Babol. He began learning calligraphy and singing in high school, and as he became acquainted with the Kamkar family, Bijani became more familiar with music. The result of this acquaintance was his first album entitled "The Legend of My Fatherland" composed by Arsalan Kamkar and performed by the Tehran Symphony Orchestra. In 1397, he published a collection of his calligraphic works in a cat called Nay and Ney. He learned to play the Setar instrument from Dariush Pirniakan and Ata Janguk.

== Music albums ==
- The Legend of My Fatherland – Composer: Arsalan Kamkar
- Hidden Heart – Composer: Kambiz Roshanravan
- Mirror in the Mirror – Composer: Kambiz Roshanravan
- Alley – Composer: Ismail Vaseghi
- Gol Be Daman – Composer: Pashang Kamkar
- Colorful Dream – Composer: Mohammad Sarir
- Red Apple of the Sun – Composer: Kambiz Roshanravan
- Poet's Voice – Composer: Kambiz Roshanravan
- Iran Zamin – Composer: Kambiz Roshanravan
- Four Seasons – Composer: Ismail Tehrani
- Mojdeh Baran – Composer: Kambiz Roshanravan
- Aftab Khooban – Composer: Ismail Vaseghi
- Another letter – Composer: Mohammad Javad Zarabian
- Niloufar Nilofaran – Composer: Ali Akbarpour
