= Bahman Farmanara =

Iranian film director

Bahman Farmanara بهمن فرمان‌آرا
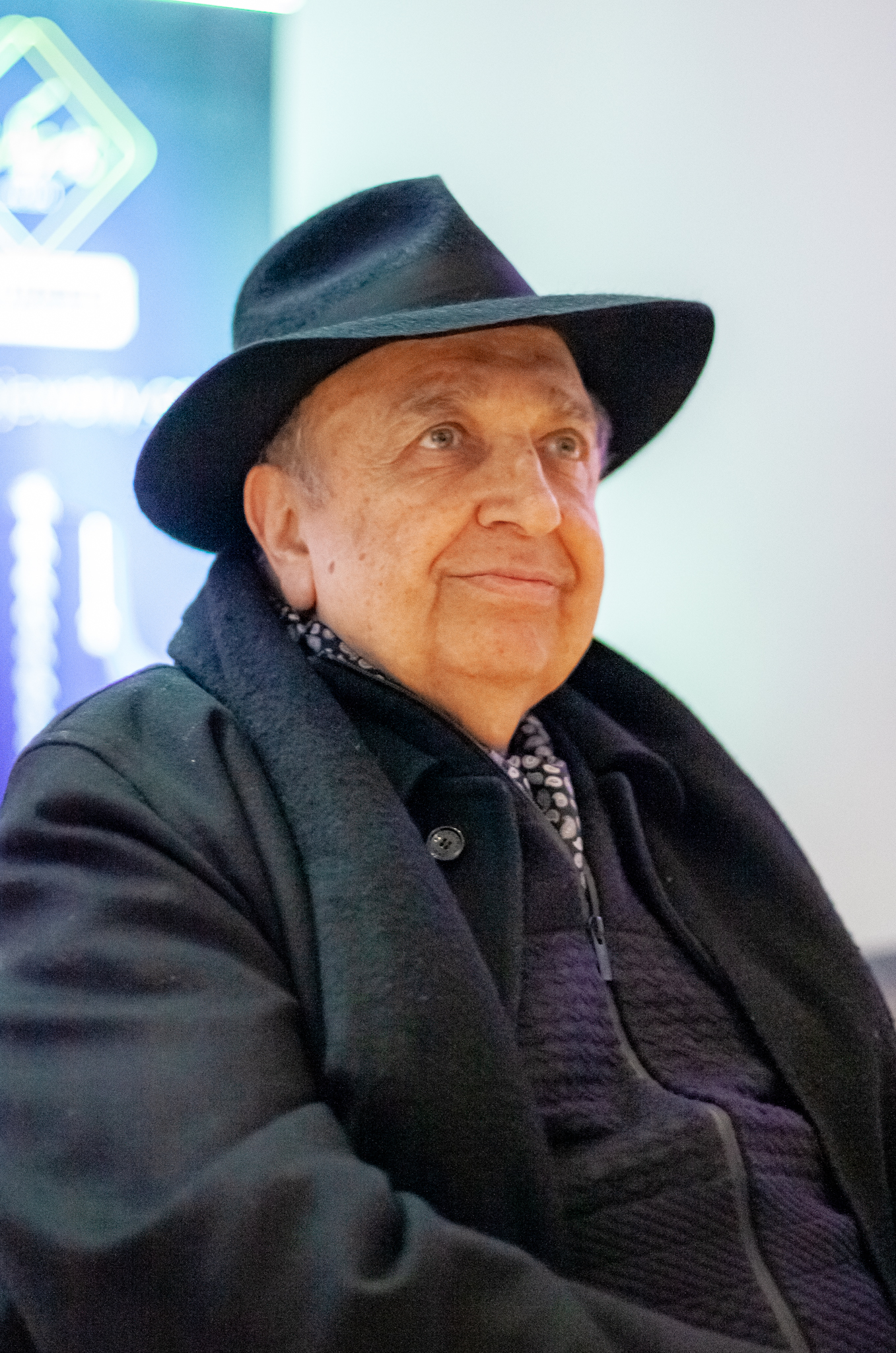
- Born: January 23, 1942 (age 84); Tehran, Iran
- Occupations: Film director, Screenwriter
- Years active: 1968–present
- Spouse: Felora Labafinejhad (m. 1967)
- Children: 3
- Website: www.bahmanfarmanara.com

Bahman Farmanara (Persian: بهمن فرمان‌آرا, romanized: Bahman Farmānārā; born 23 January 1942) is an Iranian film director, screenwriter, and film producer. He is best known for his films Smell of Camphor, Scent of Jasmine (2000), A House Built on Water (2001), and A Little Kiss (2005). Bahman Farmanara is the second son of a family of four brothers and one sister. The family business was Textile and he was the only son who did not join the company and went off to the United Kingdom and later on to the United States to study acting and directing. He graduated from the University of Southern California with a BA in Cinema in 1966. After returning to Iran and doing military service, he joined the National Iranian Radio and Television.

== Works ==
He produced some major films, including Abbas Kiarostami's first feature, The Report (1977), Bahram Bayzai's The Crow (1977), Khosrow Haritash's Divine One (1976), Mohammad Reza Aslani's Chess of the Wind (1976) and Valerio Zurlini's The Desert of the Tartars (1977 co-production with Italy and France).

Farmanara moved to France and then to Canada in 1980, establishing a distribution company and a film festival for children and young adults in Vancouver. He returned to Iran in the mid-1980s. He made and starred in Fragrance of Jasmine in 2000, which won several prizes from the International Fajr Film Festival, including The Best Film and The Best Director awards.

== Politics ==
On May 10, 2013, Farmanara signed up to run for the office of President of the Islamic Republic of Iran.

== Selected filmography ==
Director

- The House of Qamar Khanoom, 1972
- Prince Ehtedjab, 1974
- The Tall Shadows of the Wind, 1978
- Smell of Camphor, Scent of Jasmine, 2000
- A House Built on Water, 2001
- A Little Kiss, 2005 (A Teensy Kiss would be a better translation of the Persian title Yek Bus-e Ku'chu'lu)
- The Familiar Soil, 2008
- I Want to Dance, 2014
- Tale of The Sea, 2018

Producer

- The Desert of The Tartars by Valerio Zurlini, 1976
- The Divine One (Malakout) by Khosrow Haritash, 1976
- The Chess Game of the Wind (Shatranj Baad) by Mohammad Reza Aslani, 1976
- The Crow (Kalagh) by Bahram Beyzaii, 1977
- The Report (Gozaresh) by Abbas Kiarostami, 1977
- The Night Never Ends (Dar Emtedad Shab) by Parviz Sayad, 1978
- Tall Shadows Of The wind (Saye Haye Bolnd-e Baad), 1978
- Leolo by Jean Claude Lauzon, 1990
- A House Built on Water (Khane'i Rooye Aab), 2002

Writer

- Prince Ehtedjab, co-writer with Houshang Golshiri Based on Golshiri's Novel by The Same Name, 1974
- Tall Shadows of the Wind, co-writer with Houshang Golshiri, based on his short story "The First Innocent", 1979
- Smell of Camphor, Fragrance of Jasmine Original Script, 2000
- A House Built on Water Original Script, 2002
- A Little Kiss, 2005
- A Passage to Darkness Original script

Documentary films

- Norouz va Khaviar, 1969
- Tehran-e Now va Kohneh, 1970

Television

- From 1968 to 1971 Over 150 Weekly Programs on Current Cinema as Producer and Anchor

Actor

- Smell of Camphor, Scent of Jasmine, 2000
- No Choice, 2020

== Awards ==
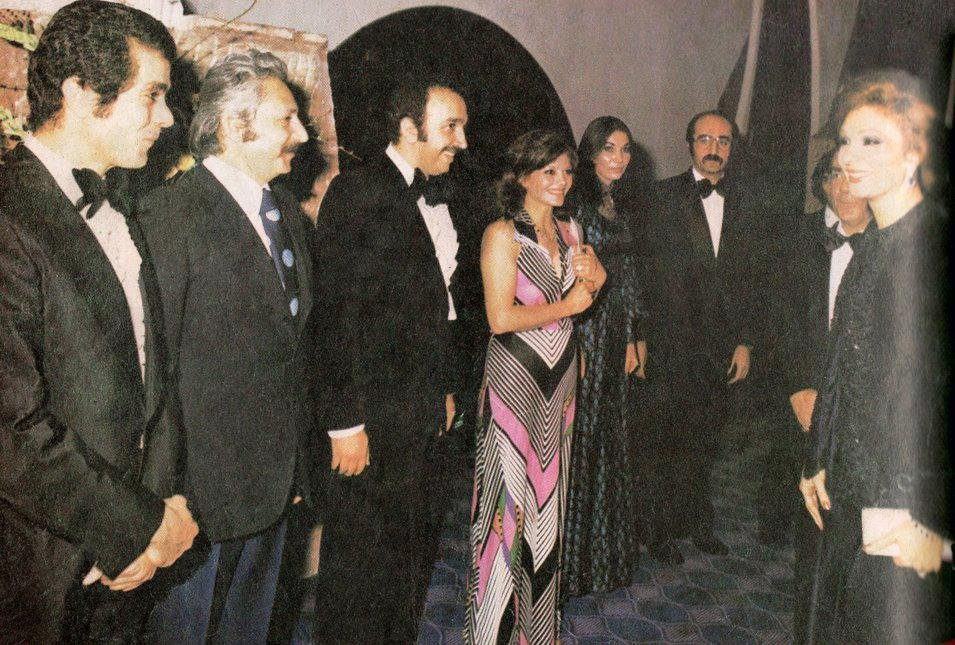
Farmanara (third from left) meeting with Empress Farah Pahlavi

- PRINCE EHTEJAB - Grand Prix For Best Film In 3rd Tehran International Film Festival 1976.
- SMELL OF CAMPHOR, FRAGRANCE OF JASMINE - 8 Awards at Fajr International Film Festival, Including Best Film, Best Director, Best Screenplay, Best Cinematography, Best Music, Best Supporting Actress, Best Art Direction, Best Make Up, Special Jury Prize For Best Film Montreal International Film Festival 2000. Golden Tulip Grand Prix As Best Film at Istanbul International Film Festival 2001.
- A HOUSE BUILT ON WATER - Winner of 5 Awards at Fajr International Film Festival, Including Best Film, Best Actor, Best Supporting Actor, Best Supporting Actress, and Best Art Direction.

== See also ==
- List of Iranian films of the 2000s
- Ahmad Pejman
- Houshang Golshiri
