= Parviz Mansouri =

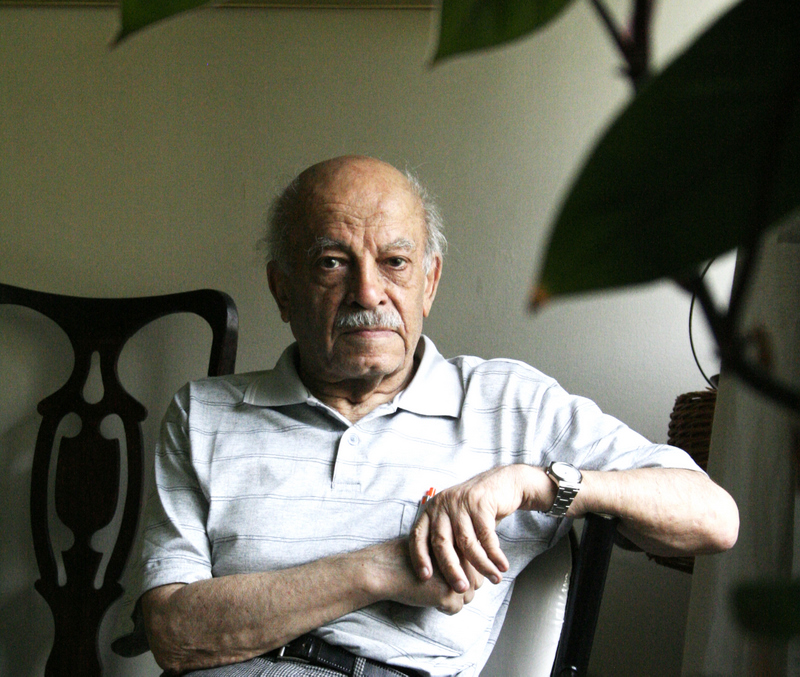

Background information
- Also known as: Parviz Mansouri
- Born: March 13, 1925; Hamedan, Iran
- Origin: Iran
- Died: December 16, 2011 (aged 86)
- Occupations: Composer, performing musician
- Instruments: Violin, timpani

Parviz Mansouri (Persian: پرویز منصوری, March 13, 1925 – December 16, 2011) was a teacher of music theory and music critic. His book Fundamental Theory of Music is his most famous work, which was selected as the "Book of the Year" in Iran in 1992.

== Biography ==
Parviz Mansouri was born in 1925 in Hamedan. He completed his primary and secondary education in Tehran, and due to his father's transfer to Isfahan, he spent the last two years of high school in that city. On his return to Tehran in 1948, he first enrolled in the Faculty of Medicine and then in the field of Chemistry of the Faculty of Science. Eventually, however, his growing interest in music led him to the Higher Conservatory of Music (Tehran Conservatory). Parviz Mansouri was accepted into the violin class and left those two academic fields forever. He started studying Iranian music by learning Iranian violin from Musa Ney Davood.

At that time, two Iranian musicians, Hossein Nasehi and Samin Baghcheban, who had returned from a study trip to Ankara, founded composing for the first time at the conservatory. Parviz Mansouri then changed his field of study and studied composition with Hossein Nasehi. Mansouri's talent was such that Nasehi entered the field of composition without holding an entrance exam. After Nasehi, he continued his studies with Haimo Tuiber, an Austrian musician who was employed by the conservatory. Meeting Haimo Tuber marked a turning point in Mansouri's life, and the thought of traveling to Austria to continue his studies at the Vienna Academy of Music made him think. His main teacher at the academy was the famous Austrian composer Hanns Jelinek. His first book – Rimsky-Korsakov – was the product of this student period. His stay in Austria lasted eleven years, where he chose to play the percussion instrument to become acquainted with various works in orchestras and to study different scores.

Parviz Mansouri finished his education in 1970 and later returned to Tehran at the request of his family and after the death of his mother, where he taught music theory for 20-year. He was also the editor of the third volume of Music Magazine. However, due to his affiliation with forbidden political ideals, he remained unemployed for many years, and only a few years before the Islamic Revolution, he was able to teach music theory and form at the conservatory and at the Faculty of Fine Arts in Tehran and a few years after the revolution he went back to Austria.

He compiled and published some of the conservatory textbooks. Parviz Mansouri, both in the field of translating and writing music books, has been one of the first and most serious authors in this field in Persian.

Mansouri's most well-known and influential book is The Fundamental Theory of Music, which has been reprinted 40 times and was selected as the Book of the Year in 1992. This book can be called one of the best-selling music books in the history of Iran. Mansouri died on Friday, December 16, 2011, at the age of 87 due to heart failure at his home in Austria. He had willed that he be buried in Iran after his death. Mansouri's body was transported to Tehran via Frankfurt and was buried on Tuesday (December 26) in the "Artists' Section of Behesht Zahra Cemetery".
