= Ahmad Pejman =

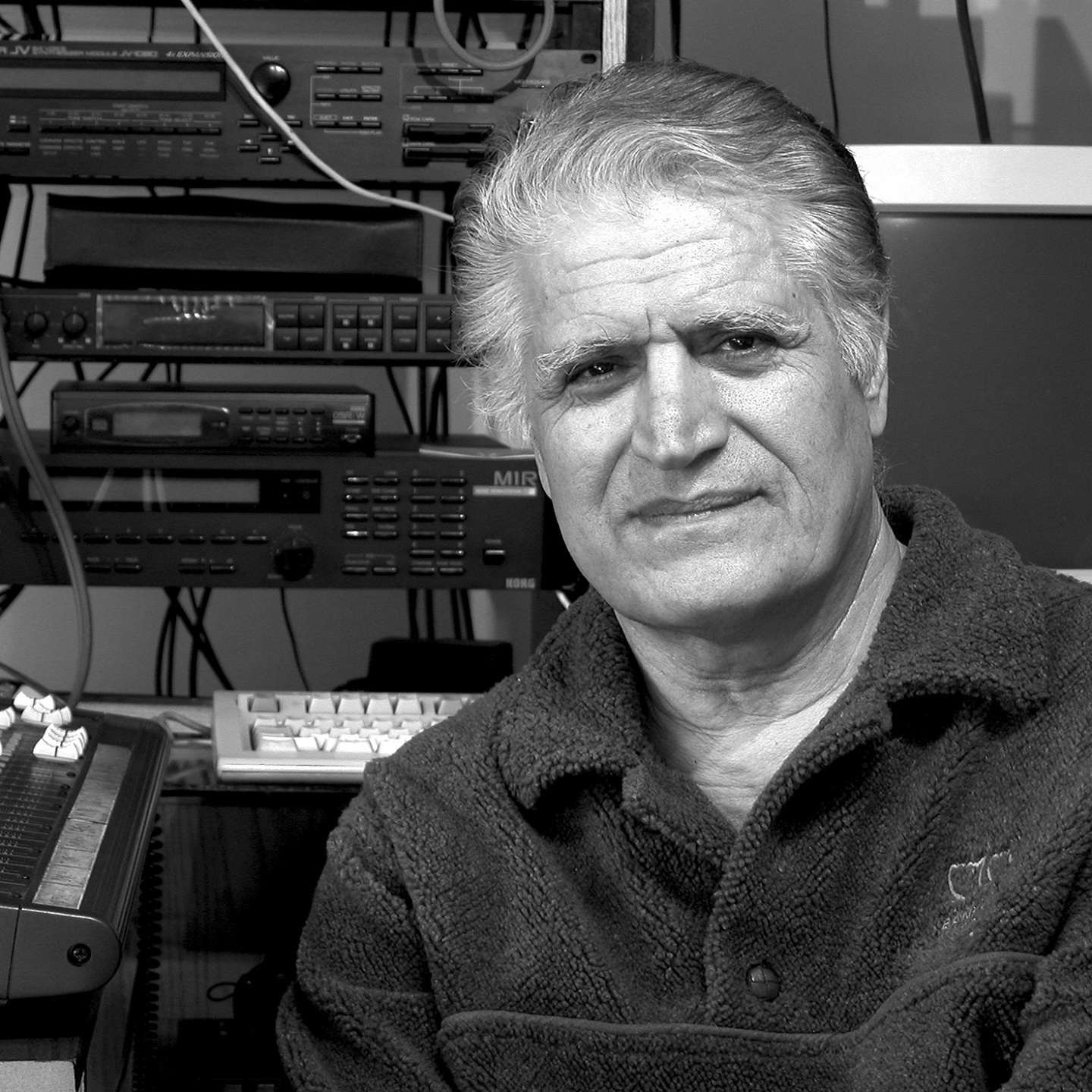

Background information
- Born: 9 July 1935; Lar, Iran
- Died: 29 August 2025 (aged 90) Los Angeles, California, United States
- Genres: Persian symphonic music; Film score; contemporary classical music; post-romanticism
- Occupation: Composer
- Instrument: Violin
- Years active: 1965–2025

Ahmad Pejman (Persian: احمد پژمان ; 9 July 1935 – 29 August 2025), also spelled as Ahmad Pezhman, was an Iranian contemporary classical composer who resided in the United States. Pejman was notable for his works in opera, symphonies and music for film.

== Life and career ==
Born on 9 July 1935 in Lar, Iran, Pejman was exposed to the sounds and rhythms of southern Iran from an early childhood. In high school he started violin lessons with Heshmat Sanjari and music theory with Hossein Nassehi.

As a young violinist with the Tehran Symphony Orchestra, he was awarded a scholarship to study composition at the Music Academy in Vienna. He studied composition with Thomas Christian David, Alfred Uhl, and Hans Jelineck, Friedrich Cerha. As a first year student at the Academy, Pejman's compositions were performed by the Vienna Chamber Orchestra and his orchestral work Rhapsody was performed by the Vienna Radio Symphony Orchestra. In his third year as a student, he was commissioned to write the first Persian Opera Rustic Festival for the opening of the Tehran Opera house, Rudaki Hall. Upon graduation from the Academy of Music in Vienna, Pejman returned to Iran in 1968, where he was commissioned to write the opera Hero of Sahand (Delāvar-e-Sahand) which was based on legendary Persian hero Babak Khorramdin. The opera was premiered at Roudaki Hall in 1968. Between 1969 and 1978, Pejman continued to compose symphonic works, operas, ballets, and also wrote many scores for motion pictures and television programs.

In 1976, three years before the Iranian revolution, Pejman moved to New York, where he entered Columbia University's Doctorate of Music program in New York and continued his studies with Buelant Arel, Vladimir Ussachevsky and Jack Beeson.

In 1984, Pejman moved to Los Angeles and continued to compose and arrange music for jazz and pop ensembles, and motion pictures.

In 1992, Pejman was commissioned to write a cantata for choir and orchestra for the liberation of Khorramshahr. He was then commissioned to write music for a musical theater to be performed at Vahdat Hall (previously called Rudaki). Since 1993, Pejman has been writing film music, composing for the orchestra and choir and releasing various soundtracks and CDs.

Pejman died on 29 August 2025, at the age of 90.

== Compositions ==
Pejman wrote orchestral works, operas, film scores, ballet pieces and popular music.

- Concerto for nine instruments 1964 (Student at Music Academy in Vienna)
- Rhapsody for orchestra 1965 (Student at Music Academy in Vienna)
- Sonata for viola and piano (1966) (Student at Music Academy in Vienna)
- Parsian Overture (1966) (Student at Music Academy in Vienna)
- Rustic Festival, Opera in one act for the opening of Rudaki Opera house,1967
- The Hero of Sahand, Opera in 2 acts, 1968
- The Illumination, Ballet, 1969
- Samandar, Opera in three acts, 1970
- Baba Barfi, Children Music, 1971
- Gol Omad, Bahar Omad, Children Music, 1971
- Music for Poems of Nima Youshij, recited by Ahmad Shamlou, 1972
- Chamber Music for Santoor and Tombak, 1972
- Ballet-Impressions, 1973
- Ayyaran, Ballet for Persian Instruments, 1974
- Symphonic Sketches, 1975
- Hemmaseh, Ballet (performed by Manchester Ballet Company) 1976
- 3 Pieces for Jazz Ensemble 1980
- Music Arrangement and Pop compositions 1988-1991
- Khorramshahr, Cantata for soloist, chorus and orchestra 1992
- Mokhtar, Musical Theater 1993
- Seven Hurdles of Rostam, Ballet 1996
- Resurrection, Oratorio Mosfilm Orchestra Moscow Academy Choir 2007
- Sohrab, Music for Soloist, Choir and Orchestra (on Sohrab Sepehri poems) 2009
- Shadows of the Sun 2010 (to be released on Hermes Records 2010)
- Norooz Symphony in 5 movements 2011
- Divertimento in 4 movements for String Orchestra 2016
- Parsava - 5 movements for solo piano 2016
- Sarzamin Delavaran (Land of the Brave) 2017

== Film and television ==
- Sadeh Celebration, Film Music Askari-Nasab director, 1971
- Daliran Tengestan TV series, Homayoon Shahnavaz director 1973
- Shazdeh Ehtejab Film Music, Bahman Farmanara, director, 1974
- Tall Shadows of the Wind Film Music, Bahman Farmanara director 1977
- Made in Iran aka Sakhte Iran Film Music, Amir Naderi director, 1978
- Crossroads of Civilization TV series, David Frost producer 1978-1979
- Veiled Threat Film Music, Cyrus Nowrasteh director, 1986
- Checkpoint Film Music Parviz Sayyad Director, 1987
- The Actor, Film Music Mohsen Makhmalbaf director, 1993
- Zinat Film Music Ebrahim Mokhtari director, 1993
- Kimia Film Music Mohammad Reza Darvish director, 1995
- The Blue Veiled Film Music, Rakhshan Bani Etemad director 1995
- Iranair documentary - Film Music Mostafa R. Karimi 1997
- Friendly Persuasion Film Music Jamsheed Akrami director 1999
- Smell of Camphor, Fragrance of Jasmine Film Music, Bahman Farmanara 2000
- Baran Film Music Majid Majidi director 2001
- Along the Wind Documentary film music Manouchehr Tayyab director 2001
- A House Built on Water Film Music Bahman Farmanara director 2002
- Astan Ghods Razavi Documentary Film Music Manouchehr Tayyab director 2003
- A Little Kiss Film Music Bahman Farmanara Director, 2005
- The Willow Tree Film Music Majid Majidi Director 2005
- Sea of Pars Documentary Film Music Manouchehr Tayyab director, 2006
- Alborz Documentary Film Music Manouchehr Tayyab director, 2011

== Recordings ==
- Hameh Shahre Iran (Ethnic Music of Iran) - Naydavood Records
- Jing-o-jing-e saaz - Aladdin Records
- Eternal River - Aladdin Records
- Symphonic Sketches - Aladdin Records
- Tigress - Aladdin Records
- Memories of Tomorrow - Hermes Records
- Mirage - Hermes Records
- Lunatic - Hermes Records
- Haft Khan Rostam - MZM Records

== Tribute ==
"Resurrection concert" or "A Persian Night with Vancouver Opera Orchestra featuring Vancouver Bach Choir was held at Orpheum theatre in Vancouver on January 20, 2019 to pay tribute to Ahmad Pejman. The creator director and producer of the concert was Mohammad Fazlali. For the very first time in Canada, 150 Professional musicians graced the magnificent Orpheum Theatre to perform masterpieces by renowned Iranian composers on the Persian Night concert. Three movements of Symphonic Poem "Sudden Resurrection" composed by Ahmad Pejman were performed in this concert, conducted by Leslie Dala. This concert was World live premiere of "Sudden Resurrection". Ahmad Pejman was present in the concert. Pieces from other Iranian composers; Loris Tjeknavorian, Hooshang Kamkar, Homayoun Khorram, Gholamhossein Minbashian, Fardin Khalatbari, Mahyar Alizadeh, Ramin Jamalpour, Saman Samimi were in the repertoire of the concert as well. Alireza Ghorbani and Talin Ohanian were Vocalists in this concert.
