= Khosrow Haritash =

Iranian film director (1932–1980)

- Born: 1932; Tehran, Iran
- Died: 1980 (aged 47–48); Tehran, Iran
- Occupations: Film director Screenwriter
- Years active: 1971–1976

Khosrow Haritash (Persian: خسرو هریتاش; 1932–1980) was an Iranian film director. He attended the USC School of Cinematic Arts in Los Angeles during the years in 1965–66, and directed two films there, one of which was an adaptation of Samuel Beckett's Waiting for Godot.

== Filmography ==
- Adamak (1971)
- Speeding Naked Till High Noon (1976)
- Malakout (1976)
- The Custodian (1976)
