= List of Iranian films of the 2020s =

The following is lists of Iranian films scheduled to be released in 2020s.

== 2020 ==
English title	Native title	Director(s)	Cast	Ref
Sun Children	خورشید	Majid Majidi	Rouhollah Zamani, Shamila Shirzad, Javad Ezzati, Ali Nassirian and Tannaz Tabatabaei	
Skin	پوست	Bahman Ark & Bahram Ark	Javad Ghamati, Fatemeh Masoudifar, Mahmoud Nazaralian and Nasser Hashemi	
Ballad of a White Cow	قصیده گاو سفید	Behtash Sanaeeha	Maryam Moqadam, Alireza Sanifar and Pouria Rahimi Sam	
Walnut Tree	درخت گردو	Mohammad Hossein Mahdavian	Payman Maadi, Minoo Sharifi, Mina Sadati and Mehran Modiri	
Exodus	خروج	Ebrahim Hatamikia	Faramarz Gharibian, Pantea Panahiha, Mohammad Reza Sharifinia, Kambiz Dirbaz, Jahangir Almasi and Atash Taqipour	
The Night	آن شب	Kourosh Ahari	Shahab Hosseini, Niousha Noor and Gia Mora	
Butterfly Stroke	شنای پروانه	Mohammad Kart	Javad Ezzati, Tannaz Tabatabaei, Amir Aghaei and Pantea Bahram	
Abadan 11 60	آبادان یازده ۶۰	Mehrdad Khoshbakht	Alireza Kamali, Vida Javan, Hassan Majooni and Nader Soleimani	

== 2021 ==
=== January–March ===
Opening		English title	Native title	Director(s)	Genre(s)	Cast	Ref.
J A N U A R Y	12						
F E B R U A R Y	12						
F E B R U A R Y	22						
M A R C H	9						
M A R C H	17	Sun Children	خورشید	Majid Majidi	Drama	Rouhollah Zamani, Javad Ezzati, Shamila Shirzad, Ali Nasirian, Abolfazl Shirzad, Mohammad Mehdi Mousavifard, Tanaz Tabatabaee	

=== April–June ===
Opening		English title	Native title	Director(s)	Genre(s)	Cast	Ref.
A P R I L	27						
M A Y	11						
M A Y	18						
M A Y	24						
M A Y	25						
J U N E	8						
J U N E	15						
J U N E	22						
J U N E	29						

=== July – September ===
Opening		English title	Native title	Director(s)	Genre(s)	Cast	Ref.
J U L Y	1	Dynamite	دینامیت	Masoud Atyabi	Comedy	Pejman Jamshidi, Ahmad Mehranfar, Mohsen Kiaee, Nazanin Bayati, Ziba Karamali, Nader Soleimani, Omid Rouhani, Ardeshir Kazemi	
A U G U S T							
A U G U S T	25	Walnut Tree	درخت گردو	Mohammad Hossein Mahdavian	Biopic, Drama	Payman Maadi, Minoo Sharifi, Mina Sadati, Mehran Modiri	
S E P T E M B E R							

=== October–December ===
Opening		English title	Native title	Director(s)	Genre(s)	Production company / Distributor	Cast	Ref.
O C T O B E R								
O C T O B E R	27	A Hero	قهرمان	Asghar Farhadi	Drama		Amir Jadidi, Mohsen Tanabandeh, Sahar Goldoost, Fereshteh Sadre Orafaee, Sarina Farhadi	
N O V E M B E R	3	Tooman	تومان	Morteza Farshabf	Drama		Mirsaeed Molavian, Mojtaba Pirzadeh, Pardis Ahmadieh, Iman Sayad Borhani, Hamed Nejabat, Sajjad Babaee	
N O V E M B E R	10	Mansour	منصور	Siavash Sarmadi	Biopic, Drama		Mohsen Ghasabian, Alireza Zamaninasab, Hamid Reza Naeemi, Mehdi Koushki, Linda Kiani, Javad Hashemi, Ghasem Zare, Atabak Naderi	
N O V E M B E R	17	Guidance Patrol 3	گشت ارشاد ۳	Saeed Soheili	Comedy		Poulad Kimiai, Saed Soheili, Behnam Bani, Amir Jafari, Mirtaher Mazloumi, Reyhaneh Parsa	
N O V E M B E R	24	Atabai	آتابای	Niki Karimi	Drama, Romance		Hadi Hejazifar, Sahar Dolatshahi, Javad Ezzati, Danial Noroush, Masoumeh Rabaninia, Mahlagha Meynoosh, Yousefali Daryadel	
N O V E M B E R	24	Romanticism of Emad and Tooba	رمانتیسم عماد و طوبا	Kaveh Sabaghzadeh	Romance, Drama, Comedy		Elnaz Habibi, Hesam Mahmoudi, Ali Ansarian	
N O V E M B E R	24	City of Cats	شهر گربه ها	Javad Hashemi	Comedy		Niusha Zeighami, Alireza Khamseh, Yousef Teymouri, Elika Abdolrazzaghi, Amin Zendegani, Amir Ghafarmanesh, Maryam Sa'adat, Reza Banafshehkhah, Mirtaher Mazloumi	
D E C E M B E R	1	Bandar Band	بندر بند	Manijeh Hekmat	Drama		Reza Koolghani, Pegah Ahangarani, Amir Hossein Taheri, Mahdieh Mousavi	
D E C E M B E R	8	Careless Crime	جنایت بی دقت	Shahram Mokri	Drama	/ Namayesh Gostaran	Babak Karimi, Abolfazl Kaheni, Siavash Cheraghipour, Mohammad Sareban, Razieh Mansouri, Masoumeh Beigi, Fariba Kamran, Adel Yaraghi, Behzad Dorani, Golnoush Ghahremani, Nasim Ahmadpour	
D E C E M B E R	15	Majority	بی همه چیز	Mohsen Gharaee	Drama		Parviz Parastouee, Hedieh Tehrani, Hadi Hejazifar, Baran Kosari, Babak Karimi, Pedram Sharifi, Laleh Marzban, Farid Sajjadi Hosseini, Mahtab Nasirpour	
D E C E M B E R	15	Black Cat	گربه سیاه	Karim Amini	Drama		Tarlan Parvaneh, Bahram Radan, Hossein Pourkarimi, Kia Rokni, Payam Ahmadinia, Bahareh Kianafshar	
D E C E M B E R	15	Automobile	اتومبیل	Ali Miri Ramesheh	Drama		Akbar Abdi, Mehdi Koushki, Sahar Ghoreishi, Arsalan Ghasemi, Nima Shahrokhshahi, Aliram Nouraee, Shahrzad Kamalzadeh, Amir Ghafarmanesh, Azita Tarkashvand	
D E C E M B E R	15	Staging	صحنه زنی	Alireza Samadi	Drama, Crime		Bahram Afshari, Majid Salehi, Payam Ahmadnia, Mahtab Keramati, Linda Kiani, Mohammad Naderi	

== 2022 ==
=== January–March ===
Opening		English title	Native title	Director(s)	Genre(s)	Cast	Ref.
J A N U A R Y	12	Silver Man	مرد نقره ای	Mohammad Hossein Latifi	Drama, Action	Mehdi Soltani, Bahareh Kianafshar, Iraj Nozari, Amir Kian Abdi, Parsia Shakourifard, Iman Amir, Behnoush Bakhtiari, Nader Soleimani	
F E B R U A R Y	12	Killer Spider	عنکبوت	Ebrahim Irajzad	Drama, Crime, Thriller	Mohsen Tanabandeh, Sareh Bayat, Shirin Yazdanbakhsh, Mahoor Alvand, Farid Sajjadi Hosseini, Ali Bagheri, Mehdi Hosseininia, Golnoush Ghahremani	
F E B R U A R Y	12	The Future	آینده	Amir Pourkian	Drama	Pantea Bahram, Kambiz Dirbaz, Bahareh Afshari, Amir Jafari, Nima Shabannejad, Alireza Ostadi, Ladan Zhavevand, Shirin Yazdanbakhsh, Shahram Ghaedi	
F E B R U A R Y	22	Anteater	مورچه خوار	Shahed Ahmadloo	Comedy	Nasrin Moghanloo, Mehdi Koushki, Reza Shafiee Jam, Linda Kiani, Maral Farjad, Nima Shahrokh Shahi	
M A R C H	9	Day Zero	روز صفر	Saeed Malekan	Action, Drama, Thriller	Amir Jadidi, Saed Soheili, Tinoo Salehi, Mohammad Reza Maleki, Mehdi Ghorbani	
M A R C H	9	The Situation of Mehdi	موقعیت مهدی	Hadi Hejazifar	Biopic, Drama, War	Hadi Hejazifar, Zhila Shahi, Vahid Hejazifar, Masoumeh Rabaninia, Rouhollah Zamani	
M A R C H	9	The Loser Man	مرد بازنده	Mohammad Hossein Mahdavian	Neo-noir, Drama	Javad Ezzati, Rana Azadivar, Babak Karimi, Anahita Dargahi, Sajjad Babaee, Mehdi Zaminpardaz, Majid Norouzi, Shabnam Ghorbani	
M A R C H	9	Own Goal	گل به خودی	Ahmad Tajari	Musical, Comedy	Shaghayegh Farahani, Nasim Adabi, Alireza Ostadi, Abolfazl Rajabi, Rayan Sarlak, LI Besharat, Arina Tajari	
M A R C H	9	Forbidden	قدغن	Majid Mafi	Drama	Sam Derakhshani, Sanaz Saeed, Afsaneh Chehrehazad, Alireza Ostadi, Mahmoud Jafari, Venus Kaneli	
M A R C H	16	Sag Band	سگ بند	Mehran Ahmadi	Comedy	Amir Jafari, Bahram Afshari, Nazanin Bayati, Sirous Gorjestani, Bahareh Kianafshar	

=== April–June ===
Opening		English title	Native title	Director(s)	Genre(s)	Production company / Distributor	Cast	Ref.
A P R I L	27	Bone Marrow	مغز استخوان	Hamid Reza Ghorbani	Drama	/ Namayesh Gostaran	Parinaz Izadyar, Babak Hamidian, Javad Ezzati, Navid Pourfaraj, Behrouz Shoeibi	
A P R I L	27	Solitary	انفرادی	Masoud Atyabi	Comedy		Reza Attaran, Mehdi Hashemi, Ahmad Mehranfar, Borzou Arjmand, Shaghayegh Dehghan, Sirous Hemati, Shakib Shajareh, Omid Rouhani, Mahsa Tahmasebi	
M A Y	11	No Choice	مجبوریم	Reza Dormishian	Drama		Negar Javaherian, Pardis Ahmadieh, Fatemeh Motamed Aria, Mojtaba Pirzadeh, Parsa Pirouzfar	
M A Y	18	How Much You Want to Cry? 2	چند میگیری گریه کنی؟ ۲	Ali Tavakolnia	Comedy		Abolfazl Pourarab, Shpejtim Arifi, Asadollah Yekta, Hamed Ahangi, Abbas Jamshidifar, Mahya Dehghani, Hamid Lolaee, Mehran Rajabi, Giti Moeini	
M A Y	24	Grassland	علفزار	Kazem Daneshi	Drama, Thriller		Sara Bahrami, Pejman Jamshidi, Setareh Pesyani, Sadaf Espahbodi, Mehdi Zaminpardaz, Tarlan Parvaneh, Erfan Naseri	
M A Y	25	Selfie with Democracy	سلفی با دموکراسی	Ali Atshani	Comedy, Drama		Pejman Bazeghi, Poulad Kimiai, Amir Abbas Golab, Atila Pesyani, Sima Tirandaz, Kourosh Tahami, Nima Shahrokh Shahi, Donya Madani	
M A Y	25	The Sea Boys	پسران دریا	Hossein Ghasemi Jami, Afshin Hashemi	Drama		Mona Farjad, Afshin Hashemi, Yasin Habibpour, Mehnoush Sheikhi	
J U N E	8	Henas	هناس	Hossein Darabi	Biopic, Drama, Thriller		Merila Zarei, Behrouz Shoeibi, Siavash Tahmoures, Vahid Rahbani, Solmaz Ghani	
J U N E	8	No Prior Appointment	بدون قرار قبلی	Behrouz Shoeibi	Drama		Pegah Ahangarani, Mostafa Zamani, Elham Korda, Saber Abar, Reza Saberi	
J U N E	8	Bonded Parents	والدین امانتی	Hossein Ghena'at	Drama		Bijan Banafshekhah, Shabnam Gholikhani, Anahita Hemmati, Ramin Nasernasir, Yousef Sayadi, Behnoush Bakhtiari, Nader Soleimani, Shahram Ghaedi	
J U N E	8	Hot Silver	نقره داغ	Mohsen Aghakhan	Comedy		Akbar Abdi, Pouria Poursorkh, Negar Abedi, Elmira Abdi, Giti Ghasemi	
J U N E	15	Silent Snail	بی صدا حلزون	Behrang Dezfoulizadeh	Drama		Hanieh Tavassoli, Mehran Ahmadi, Pedram Sharifi, Mohsen Kiaee, Alireza Jalali Tabar, Behnoush Bakhtiari	
J U N E	22	Golden Blood	طلاخون	Ebrahim Sheibani	Drama, Crime, Thriller		Shahab Hosseini, Hesam Manzour, Bahar Ghasemi, Taranom Kermanian, Zahra Khoshkam	
J U N E	22	The Sixth Day	روز ششم	Hojat Ghasemzadeh Asl	Drama		Mostafa Zamani, Jamshid Hashempour, Bahareh Afshari, Amir Jafari, Homayoun Ershadi, Mehran Ahmadi, Afshin Hashemi, Mehdi Hosseininia, Bahram Ebrahimi	
J U N E	29	Zalava	زالاوا	Arsalan Amiri	Drama, Horror		Navid Pourfaraj, Hoda Zeinolabedin, Pouria Rahimisam	

=== July – September ===
Opening		English title	Native title	Director(s)	Genre(s)	Production company / Distributor	Cast	Ref.
J U L Y	6	TiTi	تی تی	Ida Panahandeh	Drama, Romance	Evar Film Studio / Filmiran	Elnaz Shakerdoost, Parsa Pirouzfar, Hootan Shakiba	
J U L Y	6	Bazivoo	بازیوو	Amir Hossein Ghahraee	Drama, Comedy		Linda Kiani, Pejman Bazeghi, Mohammad Reza Hedayati, Borzou Arjmand, Sahar Zakaria, Reza Shafiee Jam	
J U L Y	6	Cue Ball	پیتوک	Majid Salehi	Drama		Hadi Hejazifar, Mahtab Keramati, Ehsan Bazali, Elnaz Habibi, Hassan Pourshirazi, Shahrokh Foroutanian, Shirin Agharezakashi	
J U L Y	13	Father and Daughter	پدر و دختر	Khosrow Malekan	Drama		Bahman Dan, Saghar Azizi, Arezoo Yeganeh, Ezatollah Ramazanifar	
A U G U S T	11	Amphibious	دوزیست	Borzou Niknejad	Drama	/ Khaneh Film	Javad Ezzati, Pejman Jamshidi, Hadi Hejazifar, Setareh Pesyani, Elham Akhavan, Saeed Poursamimi, Mani Haghighi	
A U G U S T	11	Kosovo	کوزوو	Meisam Hashemi Taba	Comedy, Drama		Farhad A'ish, Kourosh Tahami, Roshanak Gerami, Siavash Cheraghipour, Houman Shahi, Bahareh Kianafshar, Maryam Sa'adat, Gohar Kheirandish, Behnaz Jafari	
A U G U S T	17	Pinto	ابلق	Narges Abyar	Drama	/ Banoo Film	Elnaz Shakerdoost, Bahram Radan, Hootan Shakiba, Gelareh Abbasi, Giti Moeini, Mehran Ahmadi, Shadi Karamroudi	
A U G U S T	17	Golden Night	شب طلایی	Yousef Hatamikia	Drama	/ Filmiran	Hassan Majouni, Maryam Sa'adat, Yekta Naser, Behnaz Jafari, Masoud Keramati, Sogol Khaligh, Ali Bagheri	
A U G U S T	17	Sohrab's Dream	رویای سهراب	Ali Ghavitan	Biopic, Drama	/ Shokoufa Film	Ali Ghavitan, Mehdi Soltani, Laleh Eskandari, Tarlan Parvaneh, Mina Jafarzadeh, Hossein Alirezaee	
A U G U S T	24	Tara	تارا	Kaveh Ghahreman	Drama		Rana Azadivar, Mehdi Pakdel, Nazanin Farahani, Soroush Sehat, Masoumeh Beigi, Majid Norouzi	
A U G U S T	31	Dolphiny Boy	پسر دلفینی	Mohammad Kheirandish	Animation			
A U G U S T	31	Bank Robbers	بانک زده ها	Javad Ardakani	Comedy	/ Namayesh Gostaran	Ali Ansarian, Nasrin Moghanloo, Mirtaher Mazloumi, Bijan Banafshekhah, Sahar Ghoreishi	
S E P T E M B E R	7	Linden	نمور	Davoud Bidel	Drama	/ Hedayat Film	Mohammad Reza Alimardani, Samira Hassanpour, Nasim Adabi, Barbod Babaee, Parisa Shahvalian, Bahareh Kianafshar	
S E P T E M B E R	7	Sheen	شین	Meisam Kazazi	Drama	/ Filmmakers' Media	Shahab Hosseini, Jamshid Hashempour, Mahmoud Pakniat, Ghazaleh Nazar, Ali Shadman	

=== October–December ===
Opening		English title	Native title	Director(s)	Genre(s)	Production company / Distributor	Cast	Ref.
O C T O B E R	6	World War III (limited)	جنگ جهانی سوم	Houman Seyyedi	Drama	Namava / Shayesteh Film	Mohsen Tanabandeh, Mahsa Hejazi, Neda Jebraeili, Navid Nosrati	
O C T O B E R	6	Bam Bala	بام بالا	Seyyed Jamal Seyyed Hatami	Animation			
N O V E M B E R	1	One and a Half Floor	طبقه یک و نیم	Navid Esmaili	Drama, Comedy		Mehdi Hashemi, Sirous Hemmati, Amir Mohammad Mottaghian, Sahra Asadollahi	
N O V E M B E R	2	Beyro	بیرو	Morteza Ali Abbas Mirzaee	Biopic, Drama	Farabi Cinema Foundation / Namayesh Gostaran	Hossein Beyranvand, Reza Davoudnejad, Siavash Cheraghipour, Saeed Dakh, Sahra Asadollahi, Mohammad Alimohammadi, Soheil Ghanadan, Mehdi Zaminpardaz	
N O V E M B E R	8	Loupetoo	لوپتو	Abbas Askari	Animation			
N O V E M B E R	15	Bucharest	بخارست	Masoud Atyabi	Comedy	/ Shayesteh Film	Hossein Yari, Pejman Jamshidi, Amir Hossein Arman, Hadi Kazemi, Gholamreza Nikkhah, Babak Karimi	
D E C E M B E R	19	No One Is Waiting for You	هیچ کس منتظرت نیست	Mohsen Eslamzadeh	Documentary			
D E C E M B E R	20	Space Island (Tornado 2)	جزیره فضایی تورنادو ۲	Javad Hashemi	Comedy, Drama		Akbar Abdi, Kamran Tafti, Behnoush Bakhtiari, Elnaz Habibi, Arsalan Ghasemi	

== 2023 ==
=== January–March ===
Opening		English title	Native title	Director(s)	Genre(s)	Production company / Distributor	Cast	Ref.
J A N U A R Y	4	Conjugal Visit	ملاقات خصوصی	Omid Shams	Drama, Romance	/ Shayesteh Film	Parinaz Izadyar, Hootan Shakiba, Siavash Cheraghipour, Payam Ahmadinia, Rima Raminfar, Roya Teymourian	
J A N U A R Y	11	Left, Right	چپ، راست	Hamed Mohammadi	Comedy	/ Namayesh Gostaran	Vishka Asayesh, Sara Bahrami, Rambod Javan, Peyman Ghasemkhani, Setareh Eskandari, Soroush Sehat, Mona Farjad	
J A N U A R Y	23	Camel Coat	پالتو شتری	Mehdi Alimirzaee	Comedy	/ Film Afarin	Sam Derakhshani, Bahareh Kianafshar, Banipal Shoomoon, Linda Kiani, Shahrokh Foroutanian, Afsaneh Chehrehazad, Parvish Nazarie	
F E B R U A R Y	22	Equator	خط استوا	Asghar Naeemi	Comedy	/ Khaneh Film	Siamak Ansari, Azadeh Samadi, Farhad Aslani	
M A R C H	15	Children of the Storm	بچه های طوفان	Sadegh Sadeghdaghighi	Drama		Pejman Bazeghi, Maryam Boobani, Parham Deldar, Venus Kaneli, Reza Naji, Sogol Tahmasebi	
M A R C H	15	Fossil	فسیل	Karim Amini	Comedy	/ Filmiran	Bahram Afshari, Hadi Kazemi, Elnaz Habibi, Elahe Hesari, Iman Safa, Babak Karimi, Javad Hashemi, Alireza Nikkhah, Samaneh Moniri, Omid Rouhani	
M A R C H	15	Angel Street Bride	عروس خیابان فرشته	Mehdi Khosravi	Comedy		Mohammad Reza Sharifinia, Mehraveh Sharifinia, Alireza Jafari, Atefeh Razavi, Shaghayegh Farahani, Pouria Poursorkh	
M A R C H	15	The Strange	غریب	Mohammad Hossein Latifi	Biopic, Drama, War	Owj Arts and Media Organization / Khaneh Cinema	Babak Hamidian, Mehran Ahmadi, Pardis Pourabedini, Rahim Norouzi, Farhad Ghaemian	

=== April – June ===
Opening		English title	Native title	Director(s)	Genre(s)	Production company / Distributor	Cast	Ref.
A P R I L	15	World War III	جنگ جهانی سوم	Houman Seyyedi	Drama	Namava / Shayesteh Film	Mohsen Tanabandeh, Mahsa Hejazi, Neda Jebraeili, Navid Nosrati	
A P R I L	19	3 Puffs	سه کام حبس	Saman Salur	Drama, Thriller	/ Khaneh Film	Parinaz Izadyar, Mohsen Tanabandeh, Samira Hasanpour, Matin Sotoudeh, Maryam Boubani, Yadollah Shadmani	
A P R I L	19	Squad of Girls	دسته دختران	Monir Gheidi	War, Drama	Soureh Cinema Organization, Farabi Cinema Foundation / Bahman Sabz	Niki Karimi, Pantea Panahiha, Fereshteh Hosseini, Sadaf Asgari, Hoda Zeinolabedin, Hossein Soleimani	
A P R I L	19	Duo Song	آهنگ دو نفره	Arezoo Arzanesh	Comedy	/ Filmiran	Ahmad Mehranfar, Bahareh Kianafshar, Farzad Farzin, Amir Hossein Rostami	
A P R I L	19	Sibiloo Daddy	بابا سیبیلو	Advin Khachikian	Comedy	/ Moloud Filmmakers Media	Reza Shafieejam, Bahareh Rahnama, Amir Hossein Sadigh, Khashayar Rad, Ali Kazemi, Mohammad Panahi, Roz Razavi, Amir Nouri, Yousef Sayyadi	
M A Y	17	White Collars	یقه سفید ها	Shahram Maslakhi	Comedy	/ Hedayat Film	Mehdi Hashemi, Leila Otadi, Reza Davoodnejad, Iman Safa, Ali Ostadi, Sahra Asadollahi, Mehdi Koushki	
M A Y	24	Family Inheritance	ارثیه فامیلی	Hamed Razi	Drama, Comedy	/ Shokoufa Film	Mohammad Motevaselani, Mahshid Afsharzadeh, Mehran Zeighami, Kimia Gilani, Saed Hedayati, Khashayar Rad, Mehdi Ahmadi	
J U N E	7	The Night Guardian	نگهبان شب	Reza Mirkarimi	Drama	/ Banoo Film	Touraj Alvand, Laleh Marzban, Aliakbar Osanloo, Safoora Khoshtinat, Mohsen Kiaee, Vishka Asayesh, Kiumars Pourahmad	
J U N E	7	Imagine	تصور	Ali Behrad	Drama, Romance	/ Khaneh Film	Leila Hatami, Mehrdad Sedighian	
J U N E	7	Leather Jacket Man	کت چرمی	Hossein Mirzamohammadi	Drama	Farabi Cinema Foundation / Shahreh Farang	Javad Ezzati, Saber Abar, Sara Hatami, Gelareh Abbasi, Roya Teymourian, Setareh Pesyani, Abbas Jamshidifar, Maedeh Tahmasebi, Pantea Panahiha, Behzad Khalaj	
J U N E	7	People's Wedding	عروسی مردم	Majid Tavakoli	Drama, Comedy	/ Filmiran	Nazanin Bayati, Shakib Shajareh, Ehteram Boroumand, Zahra Davoodnejad	
J U N E	7	Lawless City	شهر هرت	Karim Amini	Comedy		Pejman Jamshidi, Shabnam Moghaddmi, Babak Karimi, Akbar Rahmati	
J U N E	7	Expediency	مصلحت	Hossein Darabi	Thriller, Drama	Owj Arts and Media Organization, Soureh Cinema Organization / Bahman Sabz	Farhad Ghaemian, Vahid Rahbani, Mehdi Hosseininia, Nazanin Farahani, Majid Norouzi, Amir Norouzi	
J U N E	21	Miracle of Love	معجزه عشق	Mohammad Reza Momtaz	Comedy	/ Shokoufa Film	Akbar Abdi, Elham Hamidi, Mirtaher Mazloumi, Mohammad Shiri, Mohammad Reza Sohrabi, Kimia Babaeean	
J U N E	28	White Fish Season	فصل ماهی سفید	Ghorban Najafi	Drama	/ Filmsazan	Mohammad Reza Foroutan, Ladan Mostofi, Milad Keymaram, Bijan Banafshekhah, Zhaleh Olov, Shaghayegh Dehghan, Elmira Dehghani, Behzad Khodaveysi, Raha Khodayari	

=== July – September ===
Opening		English title	Native title	Director(s)	Genre(s)	Production company / Distributor	Cast	Ref.
J U L Y	5	The Town	شهرک	Ali Hazrati	Drama	/ Khaneh Film	Saed Soheili, Mahtab Servati, Kazem Sayahi, Roya Javidnia, Homayoun Ershadi	
J U L Y	5	The Case Is Open	پرونده باز است	Kiumars Pourahmad	Drama	/ Filmiran	Pejman Bazeghi, Mohammad Reza Ghafari, Nasim Adabi, Hossein Pakdel, Shadi Mokhtari, Ali Bagheri, Raha Fereydouni, Azam Erfani, Sam Gharibian, Mahlagha Bagheri, Javad Tousi	
J U L Y	19	Residents of Nowhere	مقیمان ناکجا	Shahab Hosseini	Drama		Arman Darvish, Parinaz Izadyar, Nahid Moslemi, Ahmad Saatchian, Ghazaleh Nazar, Mehdi Hosseini, Shahab Hosseini	
A U G U S T	9	The Last Birthday	آخرین تولد	Navid Mahmoudi	Drama	/ Filmiran	Elnaz Shakerdoost, Pedram Sharifi, Sheida Khaligh, Armin Rahimian, Sogol Khaligh, Niloofar Koukhani, Reza Behboudi	
A U G U S T	9	A Bumpy Story	دست‌انداز	Kamal Tabrizi	Drama		Hoda Zeinolabedin, Roya Nonahali, Homayoun Ershadi, Reza Kianian, Habib Rezaee, Omid Nemati	
A U G U S T	9	Motherless	بی‌مادر	Morteza Fatemi	Drama		Amir Aghaee, Mitra Hajjar, Pejman Jamshidi, Pardis Pourabedini	
A U G U S T	9	Column 14	ستون ۱۴	Amir Hossein Hemati	Drama		Rouzbeh Hesari, Mitra Hajjar, Milad Rahimi, Mahsa Bagheri, Ali Milani, Dariush Farhang	
A U G U S T	9	Coconut 2	نارگیل ۲	Davoud Atyabi	Comedy	/ Filmiran	Bijan Banafshekhah, Alireza Ostadi, Sahar Ghoreishi, Shaghayegh Dehghan, Nasrollah Radesh, Gholam Hossein Lotfi	
A U G U S T	9	Between the Cliffs	میان صخره‌ها	Mokhtar Abdollahi	Drama		Esmail Moradi, Maryam Alahmad, Hamid Reza Gheibi, Andia Yahyapour	
S E P T E M B E R	20	Holia	هولیا	Morteza Atash Zamzam	Comedy		Pouria Poursorkh, Mohammad Reza Hedayati, Ali Ansarian, Maryam Amir Jalali	
S E P T E M B E R	27	Hotel	هتل	Masoud Atyabi	Comedy		Pejman Jamshidi, Mohsen Kiaee, Mahlagha Bagheri, Rima Raminfar, Sadaf Espahbodi, Gholamreza Nikkhah	

=== October–December ===
Opening		English title	Native title	Director(s)	Genre(s)	Production company / Distributor	Cast	Ref.
O C T O B E R	4	Punch Drunk	گیجگاه	Adel Tabrizi	Comedy, Romance	Farabi Cinema Foundation / Bahman Sabz	Hamed Behdad, Baran Kosari, Behrang Alavi, Soroush Sehat, Amir Hossein Rostami, Nader Soleimani, Bijan Banafshekhah, Maryam Hematian, Farhad A'ish	
O C T O B E R	11	Sister of Reza	اخت الرضا	Seyyed Mojtaba Tabatabaee	Drama	/ Bahman Sabz		
O C T O B E R	25	The Orange Forest	جنگل پرتقال	Arman Khansarian	Drama		Mirsaeed Molavian, Sara Bahrami	
O C T O B E R	25	The Gazelle	آهو	Houshang Golmakani	Drama		Sepideh Arman, Reza Kianian, Ali Mosaffa, Hamed Kemeili, Soheila Razavi, Reza Yazdani	
N O V E M B E R	1	Colonel Soraya	سرهنگ ثریا	Leili Aaj	Drama	Owj Arts and Media Organization	Zhaleh Sameti, Hamid Reza Mohammadi, Vahid Aghapour, Diba Zahedi, Salimeh Rangzan	
N O V E M B E R	8	The Walk Diaries	خاطرات بندباز	Hamed Rajabi	Drama		Mirsaeed Molavian, Masoumeh Beigi, Farzad Motamen	
N O V E M B E R	8	Popular	عامه پسند	Soheil Beiraghi	Drama		Fatemeh Motamed Arya, Baran Kosari, Hootan Shakiba	
N O V E M B E R	8	Around 8 AM	حدود ۸ صبح	Manouchehr Hadi	Drama	/ Hedayat Film	Yekta Naser, Manouchehr Hadi, Kambiz Dirbaz, Hamid Farrokhnezhad, Sara Rasoulzadeh, Hasan Pourshirazi	
N O V E M B E R	15	Hedgehog	جوجه تیغی	Mastaneh Mohajer	Comedy, Drama		Pantea Panahiha, Nazanin Bayati, Hamed Komaily, Anahita Dargahi, Hadi Kazemi, Pejman Bazeghi, Hooman Barghnavard, Mahtab Servati, Aida Mahiani, Sahra Asadollahi	
N O V E M B E R	22	Scent of the Wind	درب	Hadi Mohaghegh	Drama		Hadi Mohaghegh	
N O V E M B E R	29	Won't You Cry?	چرا گریه نمیکنی	Alireza Motamedi	Drama	/ Filmiran	Alireza Motamedi, Baran Kosari, Hanieh Tavassoli, Fereshteh Hosseini, Mani Haghighi, Ali Mosaffa, Linda Kiani	
N O V E M B E R	29	Selfie with Rostam	سلفی با رستم	Hossein Ghena'at	Fantasy		Amir Hossein Design, Shaghayegh Farahani, Anahita Hemmati	
D E C E M B E R	6	Beach Villa	ویلای ساحلی	Kianoush Ayari	Drama	/ Filmiran	Reza Attaran, Pejman Jamshidi, Rima Raminfar	
D E C E M B E R	6	The Opposition	ضد	Amir Abbas Rabi'i	Drama, Thriller	/ Hozeyeh Honari	Mehdi Nosrati, Leila Zare, Nader Soleimani, Linda Kiani, Mahshid Javadi, Majid Potki	
D E C E M B E R	6	No Entry & No Exit	ورود و خروج ممنوع	Omid Aghaee	Comedy		Mohammad Reza Sharifinia, Akbar Abdi, Hadi Kazemi	
D E C E M B E R	6	A Traveller From Ganora	مسافری از گونارا	Ahmad Alamdar	Animation			
D E C E M B E R	13	The Sun of That Moon	خورشید آن ماه	Setareh Eskandari	Drama, Romance	/ Filmiran	Nazanin Farahani, Pejman Bazeghi, Maryam Boobani, Amir Hossein Hashemi, Banafsheh Samadi	
D E C E M B E R	20	Refinery	پالایشگاه	Mehrdad Khoshbakht	Drama	Farabi Cinema Foundation / Shahre Farang	Banipal Shoomoon, Amir Reza Delavari, Elham Nami, Yasin Masoudi, Abdolreza Nassari, Nader Soleimani, Heidar Rahimi, Pouria Reyhani, Shaghayegh Tangestani	

== 2024 ==
=== January–March ===
Opening		English title	Native title	Director(s)	Genre(s)	Production company / Distributor	Cast	Ref.
J A N U A R Y	3	Hawaii	هاوایی	Bahman Goudarzi	Comedy		Amin Hayai, Amir Jafari, Reyhaneh Parsa	
F E B R U A R Y								
M A R C H	6	Alligator Blood	تمساح خونی	Javad Ezzati	Comedy, Drama		Javad Ezzati, Abbas Jamshidifar, Saeed Aghakhani, Elnaz Habibi, Behzad Khalaj, Shabnam Ghorbani	
M A R C H	13	Bodiless	بی بدن	Morteza Alizadeh	Drama, Crime		Elnaz Shakerdoost, Navid Pourfaraj, Gelareh Abbasi, Soroush Sehhat, Pejman Jamshidi	
M A R C H	13	Parviz Khan	پرویز خان	Ali Saghafi	Biographical, Drama		Saeed Poursamimi, Maryam Sa'adat, Khosrow Ahmadi, Hamid Reza Pegah, Behnam Tashakor, Elmira Dehghani, Mehdi Ghorbani	
M A R C H	13	Nowruz	نوروز	Soheil Movafagh	Drama		Ali Nasirian, Shabnam Moghaddami, Mehdi Hashemi, Afshin Hashemi, Mahtab Servati, Siavash Cheraghipour, Alireza Ara	
M A R C H	13	Projectionist	آپاراتچی	Ghorban-Ali Taherfar	Drama		Touraj Alvand, Fatemeh Masoudifar, Reza Naji, Vahid Mobseri, Vali Foroutan, Amin Golestaneh, Behnam Tashakor, Houman Barghnavard	
M A R C H	13	Ilia In Search of the Hero	ایلیا در جستجوی قهرمان					
M A R C H	20	The West Sky	آسمان غرب	Mohammad Asgari	Drama		Milad Keymaram, Amir Hossein Arman, Nader Fallah, Armin Rahimian, Karim Amini, Rouhollah Zamani, Touraj Alvand, Nasim Adabi	
