= Alireza Alavian =

Iranian sound designer

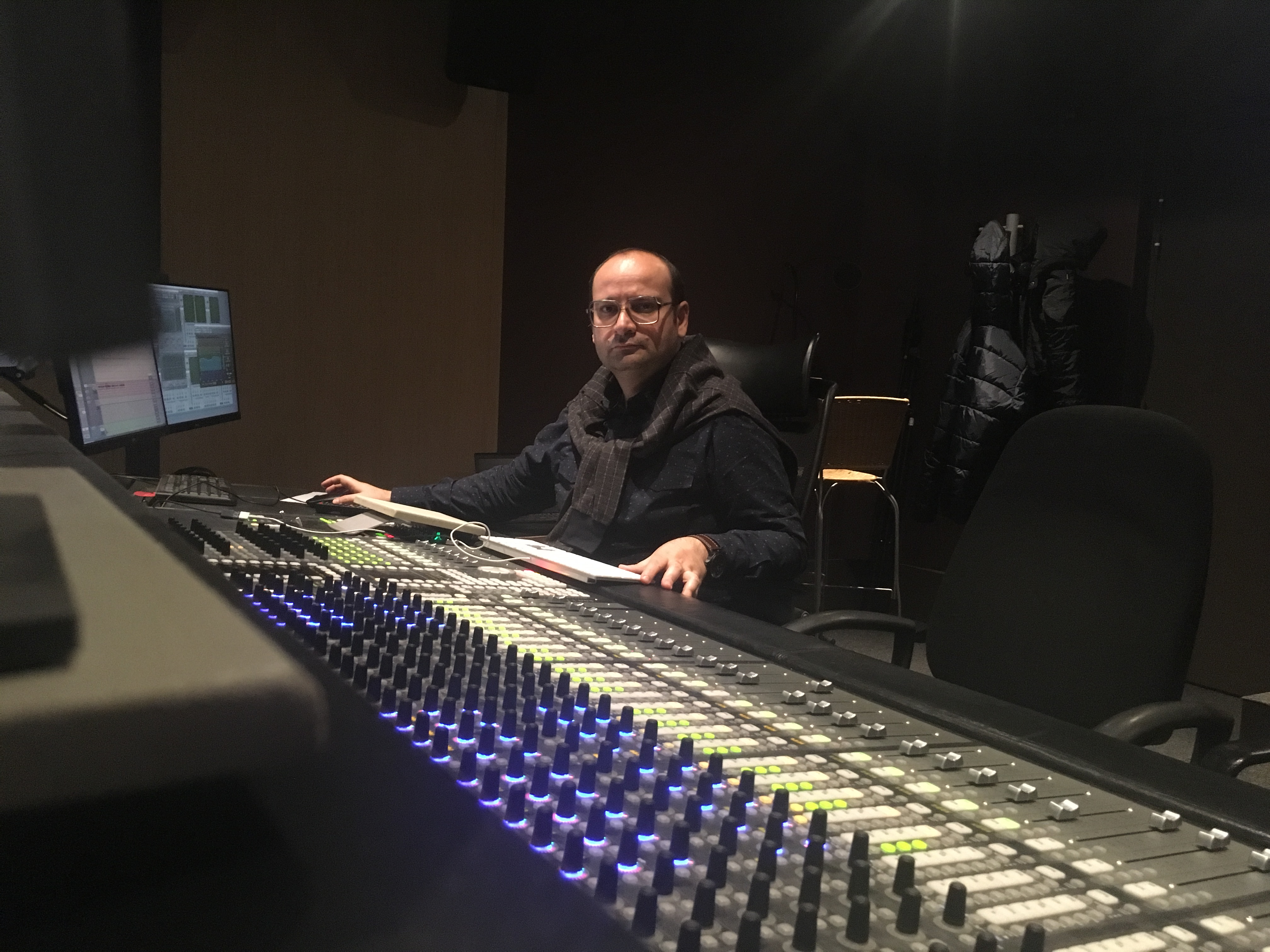
- Born: Tehran, Iran
- Occupations: Film producer, sound designer, sound editor, sound mixer
- Years active: 2001–present

Alireza Alavian (Persian: علیرضا علویان) is an Iranian film producer, sound designer, sound editor and sound mixer.

== Biography ==
Alireza began his career in cinema in 2001 as a sound assistant. Since 2003, he has been the sound mixer of "Salade Fasl" a program directed by Fereydoun Jeyrani. He has also worked with many other well-known Iranian directors. He has received numerous awards including the first International Sound Prize in Iranian cinema for sound design and sound editing of the short film "An Sooy e Bonbast (2012)" at the Best Shorts Competition - California Film Festival.

== Awards and honors ==
=== Awards ===
- 2010: Crystal Simorgh of 28th Fajr International Film Festival for Best Sound Mix & Editing for the film Anahita
- 2011: Jury prize of Jam-e-Jam Television Festival for the Best Sound Editing for the film Stories and Varieties
- 2012: Award of Merit for the Best Sound Editing for the film An Sooy e Bonbast
- 2013: Golden Jasmine for the Best Sound Editing for the film Three Fish
- 2014: Jury prize of Iran's Film Critics and Writers Association for the Best Achievement in Sound Mixing Che
- 2014: Crystal Simorgh of 32nd Fajr International Film Festival for Best Sound Mix & Editing for the film Che
- 2014: Golden Prize of Tehran International Animation Festival for the Best Sound Editing for the film They alive
- 2017: Crystal Simorgh of 35th Fajr International Film Festival for Best Sound Mix & Editing for the film No Date, No Signature
- 2018: Crystal Simorgh of 36th Fajr International Film Festival for Best Sound Mix & Editing for the films Damascus Time and Sheeple

=== Honors ===
- 2007:Nominated Jury prize of 12th Iran Cinema Celebration for Best Sound Mix & Editing for the film Miss Iran
- 2009:Nominated Crystal Simorgh of 28th Fajr International Film Festival for Best Sound Mix & Editing for the film Bidari-e Royaha
- 2015:Nominated Crystal Simorgh of 33rd Fajr International Film Festival for Best Sound Mix & Editing for the film I Am Diego Maradona
- 2019:Nominated Jury prize of 13th Cinema Vérité Film Festival for Best Sound Mix & Editing for the film Khosouf

== Filmography ==
=== Cinema ===
- 2007: Santouri
- 2012: I Am a Mother
- 2012: The Last Step
- 2012: Notoriety
- 2013: The Corridor
- 2014: Today
- 2014: Che
- 2015: Absolut Rest
- 2015: Wednesday, May 9
- 2016: Bodyguard
- 2016: Salaam Mumbai
- 2016: Malaria
- 2016: Delighted
- 2017: No Date, No Signature
- 2017: A Man of Integrity
- 2018: Damascus Time
- 2018: The Last Fiction
- 2018: 3 Faces
- 2020: Atabai
- 2020: Amphibious
- 2020: Killer Spider
- 2021: Without Everything
- 2021: Pinto
- 2021: No Prior Appointment
- 2021: Shishlik
- 2022: Grassland
- 2022: Killing a Traitor

=== Series ===
- 2014 - 2018: Shahrzad

== See also ==
- Iranian cinema
