= Crystal Simorgh for Best Actor =

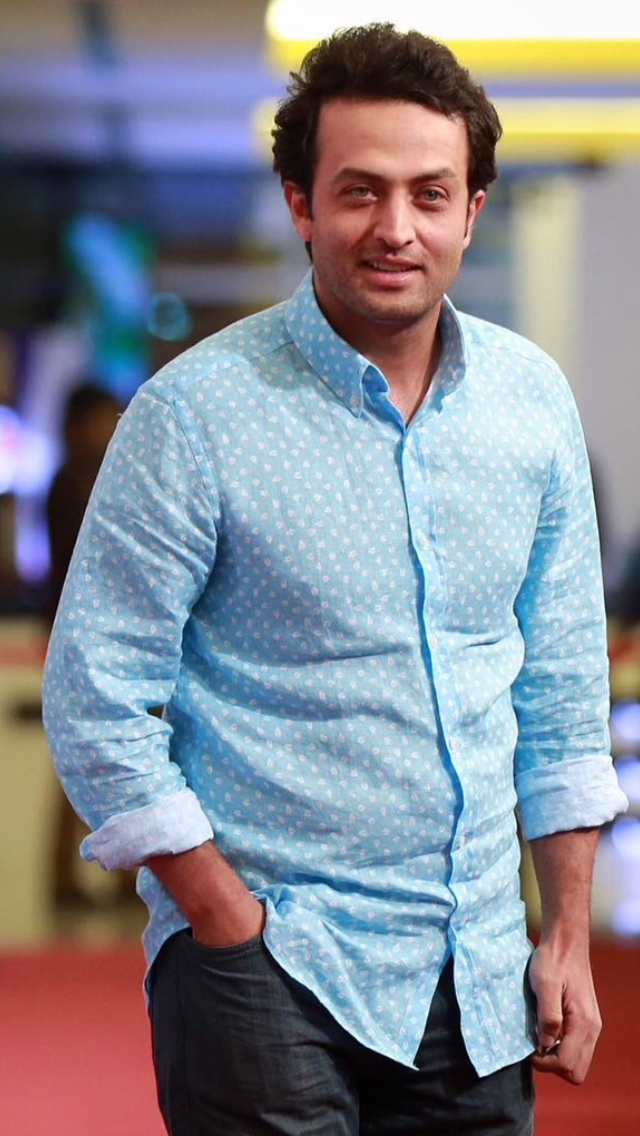
- 2025 recipient, Mostafa Zamani
- Awarded for: Best Performance by an Actor in a Leading Role
- Country: Iran
- Presented by: Fajr International Film Festival
- First award: 1984
- Currently held by: Mostafa Zamani for: North by Southwest (2025)

Highlights
- Most wins: Parviz Parastui (4 times)
- Most nominations: Parviz Parastui (12 times)
- Website: fajrfilmfestival.com

The Crystal Simorgh for Best Actor is an award presented annually by the Fajr International Film Festival.

== Winners and nominees ==
Table key
Winner
Winner of the honorary diploma

Year	Actor	Film	Original title	Role
1980s
1983 (1st)	No award given that year			
1984 (2nd)	Hossein Parvaresh	The Weak Point	نقطه ضعف	The Interrogator
1985 (3rd)	Jamshid Mashayekhi	Kamalolmolk, Chrysanthemums	کمال‌الملک, گل‌های داوودی	Kamal-ol-molk, Ostovar Hedayat
1986 (4th)	Hadi Eslami	The Bus	اتوبوس	
1986 (4th)	Iraj Tahmasb	The Finish Line	خط پایان	Khalil Samandar
1987 (5th)	Dariush Arjmand	Captain Khorshid	ناخدا خورشید	Captain Khorshid
1987 (5th)	Ezzatolah Entezami	The Lodgers	اجاره‌نشین‌ها	Abbas
1987 (5th)	Ali Nassirian	The Stone Lion	شیر سنگی	Aliyar
1988 (6th)	Faramarz Gharibian	Train	ترن	Poulad
1988 (6th)	Mehdi Hashemi	Off-Limits	خارج از محدوده	Mohammad Javad Halimi
1988 (6th)	Mehdi Fathi	Gifts	تحفه‌ها	Mafakher
1988 (6th)	Khosrow Shojazadeh	Beyond the Fire	آن سوی آتش	Nozar
1988 (6th)	Esmaeel Mehrabi	The First Lawyer	وکیل اول	
1989 (7th)	Ezzatolah Entezami	Grand Cinema	گراند سینما	Aghaiev
1989 (7th)	Jahangir Almasi	Pomegranate and Cane	نار و نی	Kamali
1989 (7th)	Ali Nassirian	The Years of Ash	سال‌های خاکستر	
1989 (7th)	Hadi Eslami	The Lead	سرب	Noori
1989 (7th)	Mehrdad Soleimani	The Scout	دیده‌بان	
1990s
1990 (8th)	Khosrow Shakibai	Hamoun	هامون	Hamid Hamoun
1990 (8th)	Mohammad Ali Keshavarz	Mother	مادر	Mohammad Ebrahim
1990 (8th)	Faramarz Sadighi	Snake Fang	دندان مار	Reza
1990 (8th)	Seyed Ali Reza Khatami	The Immigrant	مهاجر	Asad
1990 (8th)	Dariush Arjmand	The Searcher	جستجوگر	Harmas
1991 (9th)	Mehdi Hashemi	One Ticket, Two Movies!	دو فیلم با یک بلیت	
1991 (9th)	Hossein Panahi	The Shadow of Imagination	سایه خیال	Hossein Panahi
1991 (9th)	Abolfazl Poorarab	The Bride	عروس	Hamid
1991 (9th)	Dariush Farhang	One Ticket, Two Movies!	دو فیلم با یک بلیت	
1991 (9th)	Jamshid Hashempour	Love and Death	عشق و مرگ	Dr. Manoochehr Matin
1992 (10th)	Faramarz Sadighi	Attorney General	دادستان	Hossein Dadgar
1992 (10th)	Ezzatolah Entezami	Once Upon a Time, Cinema	ناصرالدین‌شاه آکتور سینما	Naser al-Din Shah Qajar / Mozaffar ad-Din Shah Qajar / Mash Hassan
1992 (10th)	Ezzatolah Entezami	The Quiet Home	خانه خلوت	Amir Jalaleddin
1992 (10th)	Parviz Poorhosseini	Avinar	اوینار	Tiva Bashir
1992 (10th)	Mohamad Kasebi	Baduk	بدوک	Abdollah
1992 (10th)	Abolfazl Poorarab	Narges	نرگس	
2013 (32rd)	Hamid Farrokhnezhad	Give Back	استرداد	Faramarz Takin
2013 (32rd)	Reza Attaran	The Corridor	دهلیز	Behzad
2013 (32rd)	Akbar Abdi	Notoriety	رسوایی	Haj Yousef
2013 (32rd)	Amir Jafari	Bending the Rules	قاعدهٔ تصادف	Shahrzad's Father
2013 (32rd)	Mehran Ahmadi	The Bright Day	روز روشن	Mr. Kiani
2014 (32rd)	Reza Attaran	Sensitive Floor	طبقهٔ حساس	Mr. Kamali
2014 (32rd)	Navid Mohammadzadeh	I'm Not Angry!	عصبانی نیستم	Navid
2014 (32rd)	Parviz Parastui	Today	امروز	Younes
2014 (32rd)	Hamed Behdad	Hard Makeup	آرایش غلیظ	Masoud Torabi
2014 (32rd)	Arash Aasefi	Hussein Who Said No	رستاخیز	Bokair
2014 (32rd)	Mehdi Fakhimzadeh	Azar, Shahdokht, Parviz And Others	آذر، شهدخت، پرویز و دیگران	Parviz Divan Beigi
2015 (33rd)	Saeed Aghakhani	The Long Farewell	خداحافظی طولانی	Yahya
2015 (33rd)	Mosen Tanabandeh	Iran Burger	ایران برگر	Fathollah Khan
2015 (33rd)	Shahab Hosseini	Time to Love	دوران عاشقی	Hamid
2015 (33rd)	Hossein Yari	Mazar-i-Sharif	مزار شریف	Shahsavan
2015 (33rd)	Siamak Safari	Confessions of My Dangerous Mind	اعترافات ذهن خطرناک من	Naser
2016 (34th)	Parviz Parastui	Bodyguard	بادیگارد	Heydar Zabihei
2016 (34th)	Farhad Aslani	Daughter	دختر	Ahmad Azizi
2016 (34th)	Reza Kianian	Where Are My Shoes?	کفشهایم کو؟	Habib Kaveh
2016 (34th)	Navid Mohammadzadeh	Sound and Fury	خشم و هیاهو	Khosrow Parsa
2016 (34th)	Payman Maadi	Life and a Day	ابد و یک روز	Morteza
2017 (35th)	Mohsen Tanabandeh	Ferrari	فراری	Nader
2017 (35th)	Amir Aghaei	No Date, No Signature	بدون تاریخ، بدون امضاء	Dr. Nariman
2017 (35th)	Ali Mosaffa	Searing Summer	تابستان داغ	Iman
2017 (35th)	Hamid Farrokhnezhad	The Good, the Bad, the Corny	خوب بد جلف	Major Shademan
2017 (35th)	Mehrdad Sedighian	Midday Adventures	ماجرای نیمروز	Hamed
2018 (36th)	Amir Jadidi	The Lost Strait, Cold Sweat	تنگه ابوقریب, عرق سرد	Hassan, Yaser Shahhosseini
2018 (36th)	Amin Hayai	Flaming	شعله‌ور	Farid
2018 (36th)	Babak Hamidian	Cypress Under Water	سرو زیر آب	Jahanbakhsh
2018 (36th)	Raza Attaran	Confiscation	مصادره	Esmail Yarjanlo
2018 (36th)	Navid Mohammadzadeh	Sheeple	مغزهای کوچک زنگ‌زده	Shahin
2018 (36th)	Saeed Aghakhani	The Truck	کامیون	
2019 (37th)	Hootan Shakiba	When the Moon Was Full	شبی‌ که ماه کامل شد	Abdolhamid Rigi
2019 (37th)	Navid Mohammadzadeh	The Warden	سرخ‌پوست	Nemat Jahed
2019 (37th)	Payman Maadi	Just 6.5	متری شیش و نیم	Samad
2019 (37th)	Hamed Behdad	Castle of Dreams	قصر شیرین	Jalal
2019 (37th)	Amin Hayai	Darkhoongah	درخونگاه	Reza Misagh
2020s
2020 (38th)	Payman Maadi	Walnut Tree	درخت گردو	Qader Molanpour
2020 (38th)	Mirsaeed Molavian	Tooman	تومان	Davood
2020 (38th)	Faramarz Gharibian	Exodus	خروج	Rahmat
2020 (38th)	Amir Jadidi	Day Zero	روز صفر	Reza / Siavash
2020 (38th)	Ali Shadman	Drowning in Holy Water	مردن در آب مطهر	Sohrab
2021 (39th)	Raza Attaran	Bright House	روشن	Roshan
2021 (39th)	Parviz Parastui	Majority	بی همه چیز	Amir
2021 (39th)	Navid Pourfaraj	Zalava	زالاوا	Masoud Ahmadi
2021 (39th)	Mohsen Tanabandeh	Once Upon a Time, Abadan	روزی روزگاری آبادان	Mosayeb
2021 (39th)	Amir Norouzi	Mom	مامان	Fereydoun
2021 (39th)	Milad Soveylavi	Yadoo	یدو	Yadoo
2022 (40th)	Amin Hayai	The Last Snow	برف آخر	Yousef
2022 (40th)	Pejman Jamshidi	Grassland	علف زار	Amir Hossein
2022 (40th)	Touraj Alvand	The Night Guardian	نگهبان شب	Rasool
2022 (40th)	Mehdi Nosrati	Anti	ضد	Saeed
2023 (41st)	Ali Nassirian	Seven Orange Blossoms	هفت بهار نارنج	
2023 (41st)	Majid Salehi	Number 10	شماره ۱۰	
2023 (41st)	Mirsaeed Molavian	The Orange Forest	جنگل پرتقال	
2023 (41st)	Javad Ezzati	Leather Jacket Man	کت چرمی	
2023 (41st)	Vahid Rahbani	My Name Is Love	یادگار جنوب	
2023 (41st)	Mostafa Zamani	Fragrant	عطر آلود	
2023 (41st)	Touraj Alvand	Mud Room	اتاقک گلی	
2024 (42nd)	Arastou Khoshrazm	The Morning of The Execution	صبح اعدام	Haj Esmaeil Rezaei
2024 (42nd)	Sajjad Babaee	Majnoon	مجنون	Mehdi Zeinoddin
2024 (42nd)	Saeed Poursamimi	Parviz Khan	پرویز خان	Parviz Dehdari
2024 (42nd)	Shahram Haghighat Doost	The Heart of Raqqa	قلب رقه	Reza
2024 (42nd)	Ali Shadman	Summer Time	تابستان همان سال	
2024 (42nd)	Javad Ezzati	Alligator Blood	تمساح خونی	Houman
