= Mohsen Gharaei =

Iranian film director and screenwriter

- Gharaei in 2026
- Born: January 27, 1984 (age 42); Behshahr, Iran
- Education: University of Tehran
- Occupations: Film director and screenwriter
- Years active: 2007 . now

Mohsen Gharaei (born January 27, 1984) is an Iranian film director and screenwriter. He studied mining engineering at the University of Tehran. Gharaei began his career in cinema in 2007 and has since gained recognition for his work.

== Filmography ==
=== Cinema ===
Year	Title	Director	Screenwriter	Editor
2012	Don't Be Tired!	Yes	No	No
2013	The Right to Remain Silent	No	No	Yes
2016	Passageway Barrier	Yes	No	No
2018	Qasr-e Shirin	No	Yes	No
2020	Without Everything	Yes	Yes	No
2026	Falling House	Yes	Yes	No

=== Home Theater Network ===
Year	Title	Director	Screenwriter	Editor
2022	Women's Secret Network	No	Yes	No

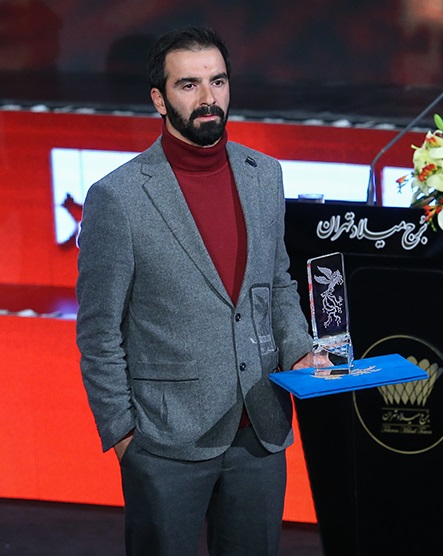
Gharaei in 2019

== Notable works ==
Qaraei's film Qasr-e Shirin (2018) earned him the Crystal Simorgh for Best Screenplay at the 37th Fajr Film Festival. The film, a drama, was well-received for its storytelling and character development.

In 2020, Qaraei directed and co-wrote Without Everything (Persian: بی‌همه‌چیز), a social drama adapted from Friedrich Dürrenmatt's play The Visit. The film premiered at the 39th Fajr Film Festival, where it won multiple awards, including the Crystal Simorgh for Best Adapted Screenplay, Best Editing, Best Music, Best Costume Design, and a Jury Special Award. It was also nominated for Best Director and Best Film, among others. The film was released in Iranian cinemas on 15 December 2021 and grossed over 9.4 billion toman at the box office.

== Accolades ==
Year	Festival	Award	Work	Result
2018	Fajr Film Festival	Crystal Simorgh for Best Screenplay	Qasr-e Shirin	Won
2020	Fajr Film Festival	Crystal Simorgh for Best Adapted Screenplay	Without Everything	Won
2020	Fajr Film Festival	Jury Special Award	Without Everything	Won
2020	Fajr Film Festival	Crystal Simorgh for Best Director	Without Everything	Nominated
