= Pesyani =

Pesyani (Persian: پسیانی) is an Iranian surname and may refer to:

- Atila Pesyani (1957–2023), Iranian actor
- Setareh Pesyani (born 1985), Iranian actress, Atila's daughter
