= Playing with Stars =

- Film poster
- Directed by: Hatef Alimardani
- Written by: Hatef Alimardani
- Produced by: Ali Sartipi
- Starring: Melisa Zakeri; Farhad Aslani; Shabnam Moghaddami; Ali Mosaffa
- Cinematography: Moein Reza Motallebi
- Edited by: Amir Adibparvar
- Music by: Bamdad Afshar
- Release date: February 1, 2021 (FIFF)
- Countries: Iran; Canada
- Languages: Persian; English

Playing with Stars (Persian: ستاره‌بازی, romanized: Setāreh-bāzī) is a 2021 Iranian drama film directed and written by Hatef Alimardani. The film screened for the first time at the 39th Fajr Film Festival and earned two nominations.

== Plot ==
The story of Setareh Bazi revolves around the migration of Iranians to Canada. It highlights the newfound love many Iranians have developed for the cold northern lands, seeking a better life and the dream of settling in one of the most popular migration destinations.

== Cast ==
- Melisa Zakeri as Saba
- Farhad Aslani as Mahmoud
- Marshall Manesh as Khazaei
- Hasti Javadi
- Michael Madsen
- Ali Mosaffa
- Shabnam Moghaddami as Raheleh
- Kÿlla Lefrançois as Paramedic
- Marlos Moreira as Jacob
- Claudia Tiseo as Christina
- Sara Samani as Saba (English VO)
- John ford
- John Wheeler
- Hassan Sanati as Shahin
- Saman Aslani
- Seyyede Fatemeh Shahourani

== Reception ==
=== Accolades ===
Year	Award	Category	Recipient	Result	Ref.
2021	Fajr Film Festival	Best Actress in a Leading Role	Melisa Zakeri	Nominated	
2021	Fajr Film Festival	Best Makeup	Roksana Razavi	Nominated	
