= 39th Fajr Film Festival =

Film festival in Iran

- Opening film: Romanticism of Emad and Tooba by Kaveh Sabagh Zadeh
- Closing film: TiTi by Ida Panahandeh
- Location: Milad Tower
- Founded: 1983
- No. of films: 31 films
- Festival date: Opening: February 1, 2021; Closing: February 11, 2021
- Website: Fajr Film Festival

Fajr Film Festival
- 40th 38th

39th Fajr Film Awards
- Date: February 11, 2021
- Site: Milad Tower, Tehran, Tehran Province, Iran
- Organised by: Farabi Cinema Foundation; Ministry of Culture and Islamic Guidance

Highlights
- Most awards: Majority, Yadoo (5)
- Most nominations: Majority (14)
- Best Film: Yadoo
- Special Jury Prize: Javad Norouzbeigi (producer) – Majority
- Audience Choice of Best Film: Pinto
- Website: Fajr Film Festival

The 39th Fajr Film Festival (Persian: سی و نهمین جشنواره فیلم فجر) was held from 1 to 11 February 2021 in Tehran, Iran. The nominees for the 39th Fajr Film Festival were announced on February 10, 2021, at a press conference.

== Jury ==
=== Main Competition ===
- Mohammad Ehsani
- Sareh Bayat
- Morteza Poursamadi
- Bahram Tavakoli
- Nima Javidi
- Seyyed Jamal Sadatian
- Mostafa Kiaei

=== First Look, Short Film, Documentary ===
- Saeed Pouresmaili
- Amir Tooderousta
- Mohammad Ali Farsi
- Mohammad Kart
- Sam Kalantari

=== Advertising Competition ===
- Ebrahim Haghighi
- Mitra Mohaseni
- Meysam Molaei

== Winners and nominees ==
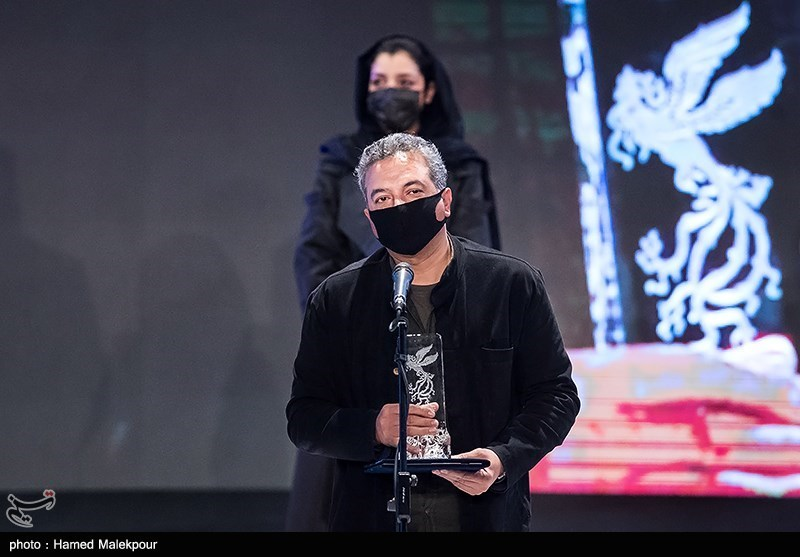
Mehdi Jafari, Best Director winner

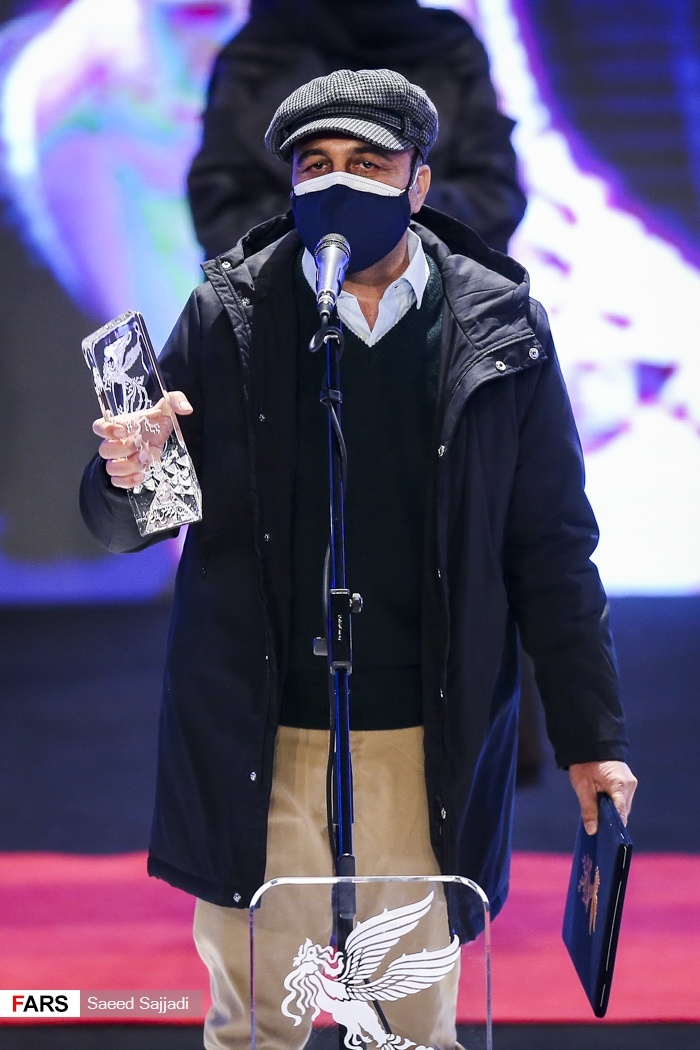
Reza Attaran, Best Actor winner

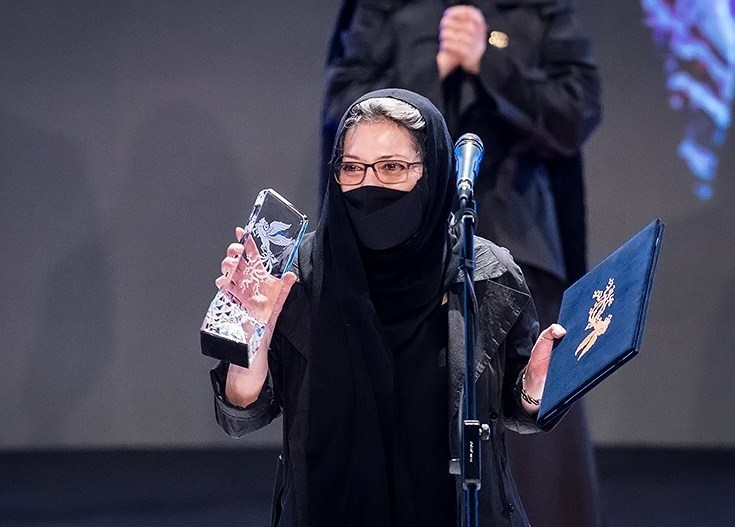
Roya Afshar, Best Actress winner

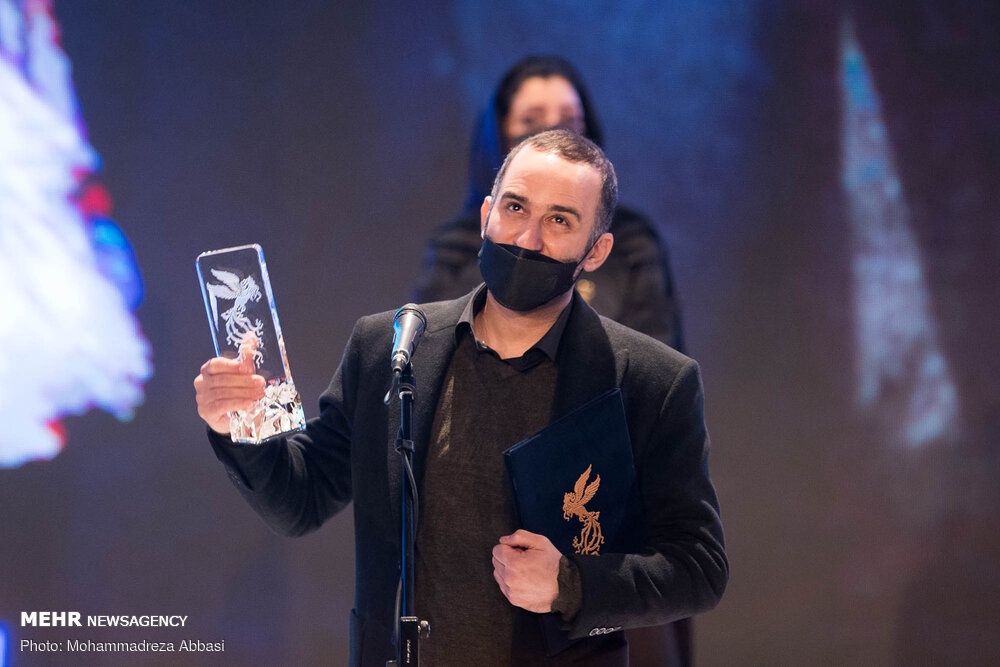
Pouria Rahimi Sam, Best Supporting Actor winner

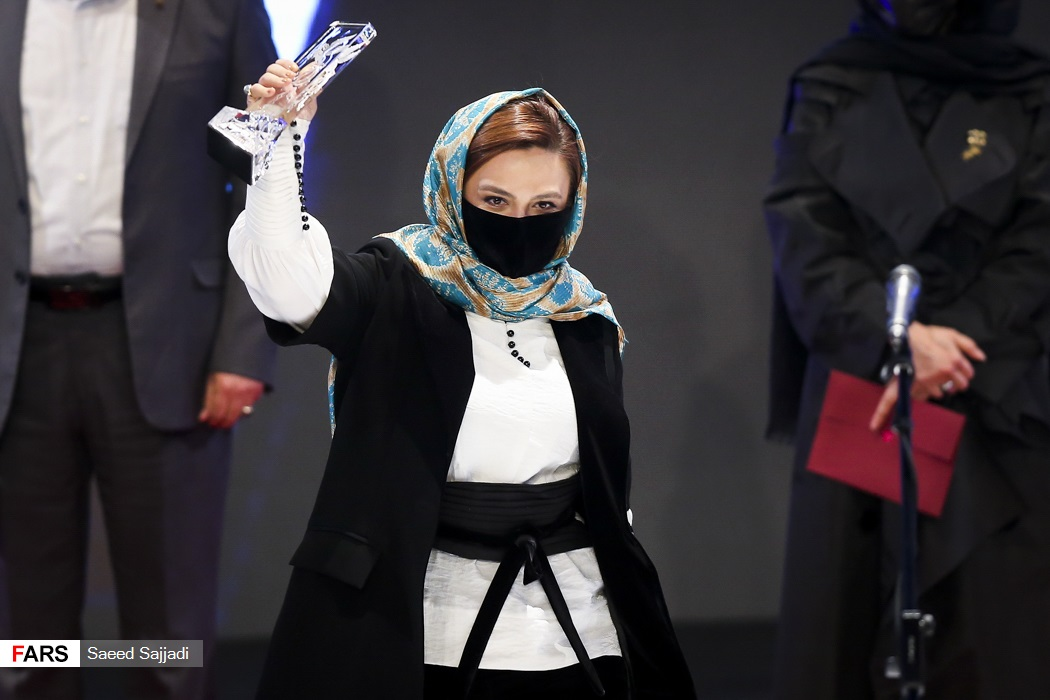
Gelareh Abbasi, Best Supporting Actress winner

=== Main Competition ===
Best Director	Best Film
Mehdi Jafari – Yadoo; Narges Abyar – Pinto; Mohsen Gharaee – Majority; Arsalan Amiri – Zalava	Yadoo; Pinto; Majority; Zalava
Best Actress	Best Actor
Roya Afshar – Mom as Nasrin; Setareh Pesyani – Yadoo (Honorary Diploma) as; Elnaz Habibi – Romanticism of Emad and Tooba as Tooba; Melisa Zakeri – Playing with Stars as Saba; Elnaz Shakerdoost – Pinto as Raheleh; Nazanin Farahani – Expediency (Maslahat (film)) as	Raza Attaran – Bright House as Roshan; Parviz Parastui – Majority as Amir; Navid Pourfaraj – Zalava as Masoud Ahmadi; Mosen Tanabandeh – Once Upon a Time, Abadan as Mosayeb; Amir Norouzi – Mom as Fereydoun; Milad Soveylavi – Yadoo as Yadoo
Best Supporting Actress	Best Supporting Actor
Gelareh Abbasi – Pinto as Shahla; Azita Hajian – 180° Rule as Sara's Mother; Elham Shafiei – Once Upon a Time, Abadan as Soheileh; Giti Moeini – Pinto as Ashrat	Pouria Rahimi Sam – Zalava as Amardan; Vahid Rahbani – Expediency as Hossein Jalali; Erfan Ebrahimi – Mom as; Pejman Jamshidi – Shishlik as Ahmad; Pedram Sharifi – Majority as Teacher
Best Cinematography	Best Screenplay
Morteza Najafi – Bright House, Yadoo; Mohammad Rasuli – Zalava (Honorary Diploma); Masoud Salami – Once Upon a Time, Abadan; Farshad Mohammadi – TiTi; Morteza Hedayati – Majority	Arsalan Amiri, Ida Panahandeh, Tahmineh Bahram – Zalava; Arash Anisi – Mom; Arsalan Amiri, Ida Panahandeh – TiTi
Best Original Score	Best Editor
Hamed Sabet – Majority; Payam Azadi – Romanticism of Emad and Tooba; Bamdad Afshar – Yadoo; Alireza Afkari – TiTi; Fardin Khalatabari – Expediency	Emad Khodabakhsh – Majority; Emad Khodabakhsh – Punch Drunk; Siavash Kordjan – Expediency; Meysam Molaei – Yadoo
Best Sound Effects	Best Sound Recording
Amir Hossein Ghasemi – Yadoo; Hossein Abolsedgh – The Sniper; Bahman Baniardalan – Once Upon a Time, Abadan; Alireza Alabvian – Majority; Amir Hossein Ghasemi – Zalava; Amirhossein Ghasemi – 180° Rule	Rashid Daneshmand – Yadoo; Taher Pishvaei – Pinto; Hadi Saed Mohkam – Shishlik; Shahram Motavali Bashi – The Sniper; Amir Mirshekari – Majority
Best Production Design	Best Costume Design
Soheil Daneshraqi – Once Upon a Time, Abadan; Behzad Jafari Tadi – Expediency; Mohammadreza Shojaei – Pinto; Aidin Zarif – Yadoo; Amirhossein Ghodsi – Majority	Maral Jeyrani – Majority; Behzad Jafari Tadi – Expediency; Mohammad Hossein Karami – Zalava; Behzad Jafari Tadi, Mohammad Hossein Karami – Shishlik
Best Special Effects	Best Makeup
Iman Karamian – The Sniper; Arash Aghabeyk – Bright House; Iman Karamian – Yadoo	Iman Omidvari – Pinto; Shahram Khalaj – Shishlik; Roxana Razavi – Playing with Stars; Abbas Abbasi – Yadoo
Audience Choice of Best Film	Best Visual Effects
1. Pinto; 2. Majority; 3. Shishlik; 4. The Sniper; 5. TiTI	Farid Nazerfasihi – Pinto; Mohammad Baradaran – Mansour; Javad Matoori – Majority
Special Jury Prize	Best National Film
Javad Norouzbeigi – Majority	Ebrahim Asghari – The Sniper
Best Adapted Screenplay	Best Short Film
Mohammad Davoudi, Mohsen Gharaee – Majority; Hamid Reza Azarang – Once Upon a Time, Abadan; Mehdi Jafari, Mahin Abbas Zadeh – Yadoo	Emergency; Cover; Witness; Meatophile; Mask; Nahid
Best Documentary
Coup 53; Isatis; The Silhouettes; Tattooed Dreams; 1800 Feet

=== First Look ===
Best First Film
- Zalava
- Expediency (Honorary Diploma)
  - Once Upon a Time, Abadan
  - Mom
  - Punch Drunk
  - Mansour

=== Advertising Competition ===
Best Poster Design	Best Still Photography
Vahid Abdolhosseini – Seven and a Half; Mohammad Taghi Pour – Abadan 11 60; Mohammad Moahadnia – Seven and a Half; Mohammad Shakiba – Exodus	Sahab Zaribaf – Sun Children; Jalal Hamidi – Gilda; Ali Nikraftar – Suddenly a Tree
Best Trailer
Hamid Najafirad – Drown; Masoud Rafizadeh – Blue Like Sky; Hamed Batouli – Numbness; Masoud Rafizadeh – Gold; Masoud Rafizadeh – The Good, the Bad, the Corny 2: Secret Army

=== Films with multiple wins ===
Wins	Films
5	Majority
5	Yadoo
4	Pinto
3	Zalava
2	Bright House
2	The Sniper

=== Films with multiple nominations ===
Nominations	Films
14	Majority
13	Yadoo
10	Pinto
9	Zalava
7	Once Upon a Time, Abadan
5	Shishlik
5	Mom
5	The Sniper
4	TiTi
3	Bright House
3	Expediency
2	180° Rule
2	Playing with Stars
2	Romanticism of Emad and Tooba
2	Mansour
2	Punch Drunk

== Films ==
=== Main Competition ===
Title	Director
Pinto	Narges Abyar
Majority	Mohsen Gharaee
The Sniper	Ali Ghafari
TiTi	Ida Panahandeh
180° Rule	Farnoosh Samadi
Romanticism of Emad and Tooba	Kaveh Sabaghzadeh
Once Upon a Time, Abadan	Hamid Reza Azarang
Bright House	Rouhollah Hejazi
Zalava	Arsalan Amiri
Playing with Stars	Hatef Alimardani
Shishlik	Mohammad Hossein Mahdavian
Punch Drunk	Adel Tabrizi
Mom	Arash Anisi
Expediency	Hossein Darabi
Mansour	Siavash Sarmadi
Yadoo	Mehdi Jafari

=== First Look ===
Title	Director
Expediency	Hossein Darabi
Zalava	Arsalan Amiri
Once Upon a Time, Abadan	Hamid Reza Azarang
Mom	Arash Anisi
Punch Drunk	Adel Tabrizi
Mansour	Siavash Sarmadi
180° Rule	Farnoosh Samadi

=== Documentary ===
Title	Director
Isatis	Alirerza Dehghan
The Silhouettes	Afsaneh Salari
Tattooed Dreams	Mehdi Ganji
Coup 53	Taghi Amirani
1800 Feet	Mehdi Shahmohammadi

=== Short film ===
Title	Director
Cover	Ehsan Majouni
Aydin	Mir Abbas Khosravi
Witness	Ali Asgari
Meatophile	Farid Haji
Sangbal	Amin Shahri
Mask	Nava Rezvani
Nahid	Samad Alizadeh
Emergency	Maryam Esmikhani
Slow Death	Amin Shahrai
Necrosis	Morteza Farhadnia
