= The Visit (play) =

Tragicomic play by Friedrich Dürrenmatt

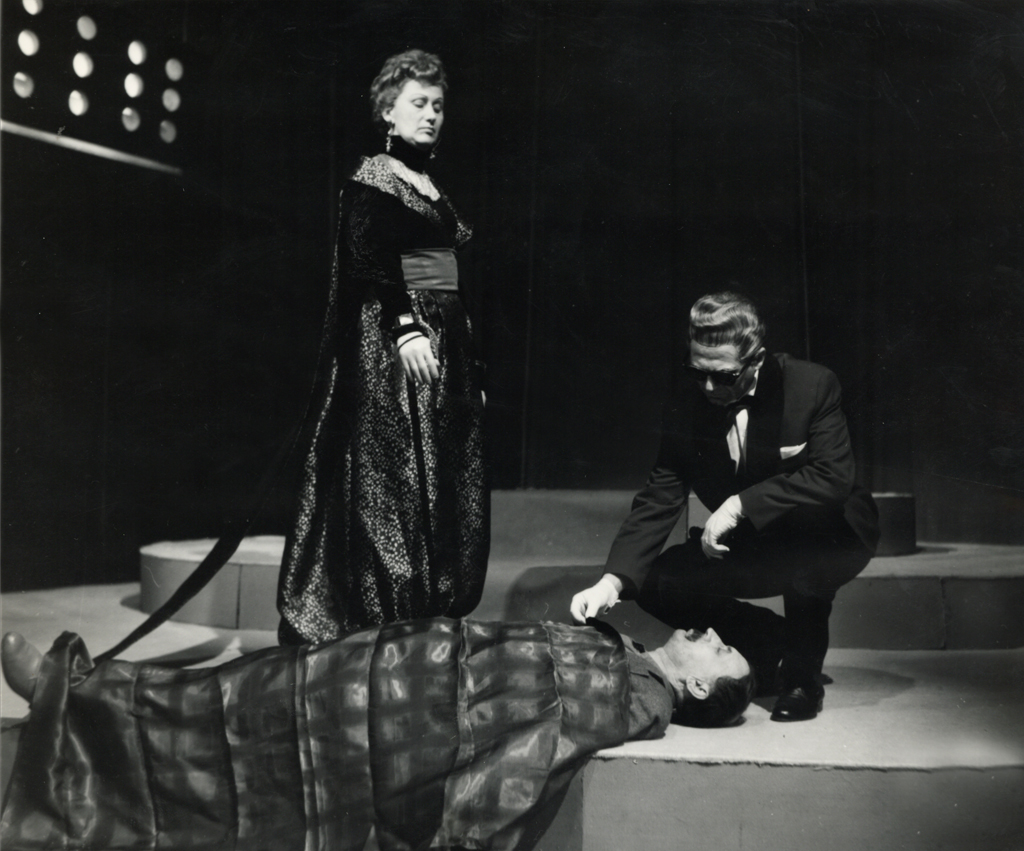
- Play performed at the Maribor Slovene National Theatre in 1960
- Original language: German
- Written by: Friedrich Dürrenmatt
- Genre: Tragicomedy
- Setting: Güllen

Premiere
- Date: 1956

The Visit (German: Der Besuch der alten Dame, English: The Visit of the Old Lady) is a 1956 tragicomic play by Swiss dramatist Friedrich Dürrenmatt.

== Plot ==
=== Act I ===
The story opens with the town of Güllen (a name evoking "liquid manure" in German) preparing for the arrival of famed billionaire Claire Zachanassian, who grew up there. Güllen has fallen on hard times, and the townspeople hope that Claire will provide them with much-needed funds. Alfred Ill (Anton Schill in a common English-language adaptation) is the owner of Güllen's general store and the most popular man in town. He was Claire's lover when they were young, and agrees with the mayor that the task of convincing her to make a donation should fall to him.

After settling into the hotel, Claire joins the rest of the town, who have gathered outside for a homecoming celebration. Claire takes the opportunity to announce that she will make a huge donation: one billion (presumably Swiss francs), half for the town and half to be shared among the families. The townspeople are overjoyed, but their happiness is damped when Claire's butler steps forward to reveal her condition for the donation. The butler was once the Chief Magistrate of Güllen, and had heard the paternity suit that Claire had brought against Alfred. In the suit, Alfred produced two false witnesses (who have since been transformed into Claire's eunuchs), and the court ruled in his favor. Socially disgraced, Claire was exiled, lost the child and eventually met a wealthy client while working as a prostitute in the city. Her donation is conditional on someone killing Alfred. The mayor refuses and the town seems aghast, but Claire says that she will wait.

=== Act II ===
As time passes, Alfred becomes increasingly paranoid as he sees everyone purchasing especially costly items on credit in his shop. Alfred visits the police officer and the mayor, who have also bought new expensive items, and they dismiss his concerns. He then visits the priest, who attempts to calm him, but finally admits they have been paid off, and advises Alfred to flee.

Alfred heads to the railway station to escape, but finds that the entire town is gathered there. They ask him where he is going, and he says that he is planning to move to Australia. They wish him well, again assuring him that he has nothing to fear in Güllen, but Alfred grows increasingly nervous nonetheless. The train arrives, but he decides not to board, believing that someone will stop him anyway. Paralyzed, he collapses in the crowd, crying, "I'm lost!"

=== Act III ===
Claire weds a new husband in the Güllen cathedral. The doctor and the schoolmaster go to see her and explain that the townspeople have run up considerable debt since her arrival. The schoolmaster begs her to abandon her desire for vengeance and help the town out of the goodness of her heart, and also because it would be good business: they need her money merely as (profitable) investment, as the city despite its current ruined state has great economic potential. However, Claire informs him that she knows that quite well, and she herself had caused Güllen to fall on hard times to ensure that the people would do anything for money.

Alfred's terror grows as the townspeople buy more expensive products on credit. Hearing of Claire's wedding, reporters are everywhere, and they enter the store to interview Alfred. The schoolmaster, drunk, tries to inform the press about Claire's proposal, but the townspeople stop him. The schoolmaster and Alfred have a discussion and the schoolmaster explains Alfred will be killed. Alfred accepts his guilt and acknowledges the town's suffering is his fault. Alfred is then confronted by the mayor who asks if he will accept the town's judgment. Alfred says that he will.

Claire tells Alfred that she never stopped loving him, but that over time her love has grown into something monstrous.

When Alfred arrives at the town meeting, it is flooded with the press, and the town publicly announces their acceptance of Claire's donation. The inhabitants then go through the formality of a vote, which is unanimous, and the mayor states that they have Alfred to thank for their newfound wealth. The doors are locked and the lights dimmed. Alfred is killed by a crowd of townspeople. Just as a reporter reappears in the auditorium, the doctor announces that Alfred has died of a heart attack. The reporters gather and declare that Alfred has died of joy. Claire examines the body, gives the mayor his cheque, and leaves the town with Alfred's body in the casket that she brought with her when she arrived.

== Notable productions ==
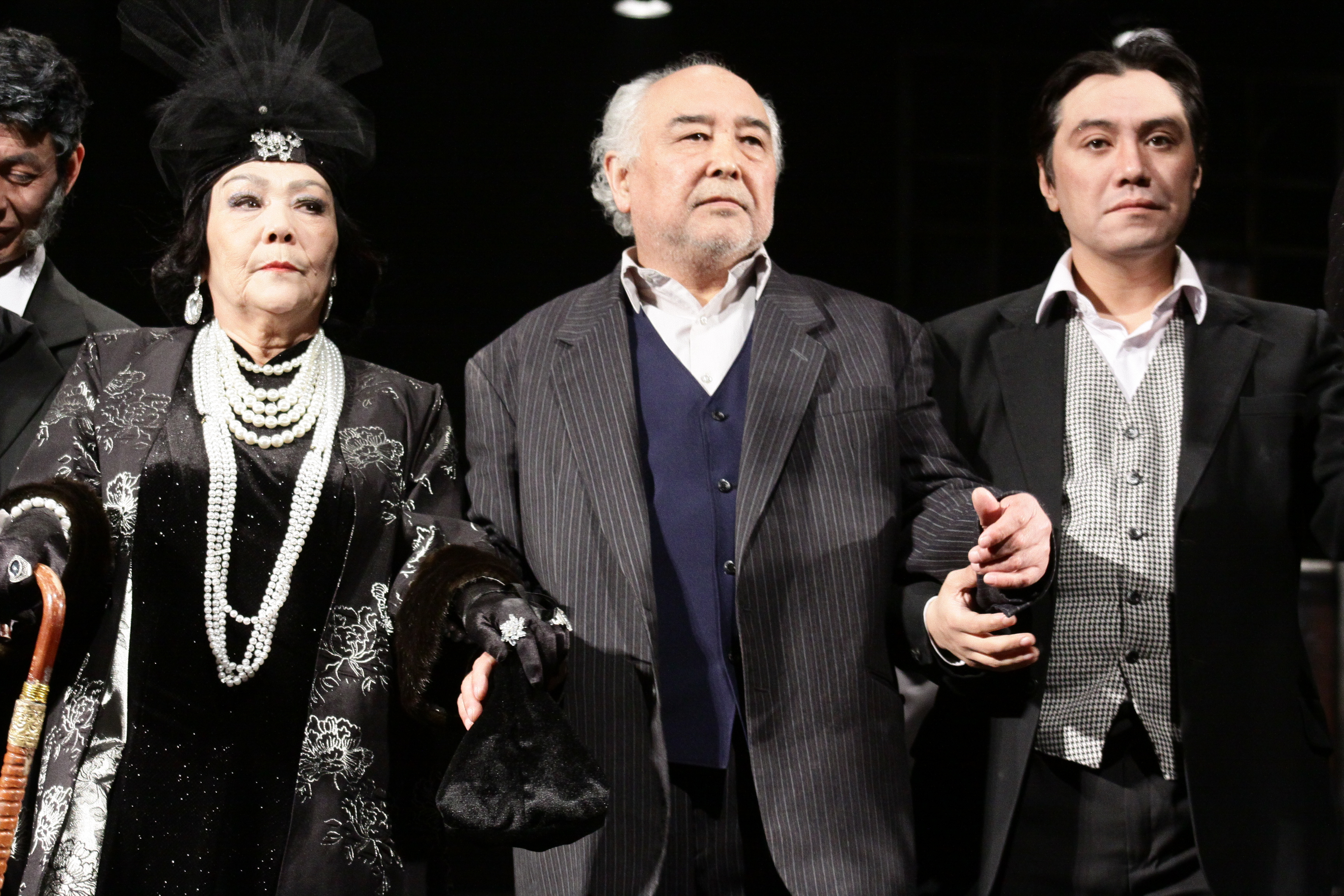
Kyrgyz Drama Theatre performing the play in 2015

The play premiered in 1956 as Besuch der alten Dame at the Schauspielhaus Zürich, with a cast that included Ruedi Walter as the blind eunuch Loby.

The original 1956 play was adapted for British audiences by Maurice Valency as The Visit. This adaptation changes several characters' names (most notably, Alfred Ill becomes Anton Schill) and removes several elements from the story. It was directed by Peter Brook and starred Alfred Lunt and Lynn Fontanne. After being seen on tour in Britain in 1957–58, the production was taken to Broadway.

The Visit was performed at Chichester Arts Festival of 1995. Players included Lauren Bacall and Joss Ackland.

A new English language adaptation written by Tony Kushner and directed by Jeremy Herrin played at the National Theatre in London from February 11 to May 13, 2020. Starring Lesley Manville as Claire and Hugo Weaving as Alfred, this production retained Dürrenmatt's original three-act structure (as does Valency's adaptation) but moved the location of the play from the fictional town of Güllen to the fictional town of Slurry, New York.

In Iran, the play has been translated and staged by Hamid Samandarian. It was later brought to the stage as a musical by Hadi Hejazifar.

In spring 2026 the US West Coast premiere of The Visit was announced by Pasadena Playhouse, to be directed by Darko Tresnjak. The production will run from September 9 through October 4, with an official opening on September 13. Melinda Page Hamilton will play Claire Zachanassian and Jefferson Mays will perform as Anton Schill.

== Adaptations ==
Ingrid Bergman and Anthony Quinn starred in a much-altered film adaptation, also called The Visit, directed by Bernhard Wicki, in 1964. A significant alteration in this 1964 film is in the ending: Just as Alfred Ill (Serge Miller in the movie) is about to be executed on the trumped-up charges the town has created, the billionairess stops the execution. She declares that she will give the money to the town as pledged. Her revenge on Miller is that now, as she declares, he must live in the town among the people who would have executed him on false charges for money.

The play was adapted as an opera libretto by the author and set to music by the composer Gottfried von Einem, under the title Der Besuch der alten Dame and translated as The Visit of the Old Lady, and was first performed in 1971.

In 1976 The Visit was adapted for Lebanese National Television Tele Liban (the only broadcasting station in Lebanon at that time) as the full sixth episode of the hit TV series "Allo Hayeti ألو حياتي" directed for TV by Antoine Remi أنطوان ريمي, and Starring Hind Abi Al Lamaa هند أبي اللمع as Claire (or Clara as called in the Lebanese production) and Abdel Majeed Majzoob عبد المجيد مجذوب as her lover Alfred, Layla Karam, Philip Akiki (as the Mayor) and Elias Rizk (as the teacher). This production made Friedrich Dürrenmatt known to the Lebanese public as well as to Arabic viewers.

Soviet filmmaker Mikhail Kozakov directed a two-part adaptation starring Yekaterina Vasilyeva and Valentin Gaft in 1989 titled Visit of a Lady.

A Senegalese film adaptation written and directed by Djibril Diop Mambéty, Hyenas, reimagined the story as an allegory of neocolonialism and African consumerism. It was entered into the 1992 Cannes Film Festival.

The Lady returns is a 1996 Argentinian film directed by Jorge Polaco starring Isabel Sarli. It won the Special Jury Prize at the 1996 Amiens International Film Festival.

A musical adaptation, The Visit, with music by John Kander, lyrics by Fred Ebb, and book by Terrence McNally, received its first production at Chicago's Goodman Theatre, starring Chita Rivera and John McMartin, in 2001. That production was choreographed by Ann Reinking and directed by Frank Galati. The musical was revised and played from May 13 – June 22, 2008, at Signature Theatre in Arlington, Virginia, in a production once again starring Rivera, this time with George Hearn. In 2015 Rivera and Roger Rees took this adaptation of The Visit to Broadway, with preview performances on March 26, 2015, at the Lyceum Theatre under the Tony Award-winning direction of John Doyle. It opened on April 23, 2015, and closed on June 14, 2015.

In 2006, Estonian actor and filmmaker Roman Baskin directed another film adaptation.

In 2021, Mohsen Gharaie directed a film adaptation titled Without Everything. It received five awards and nine nominations at the 39th Fajr Film Festival. The film had its theatrical release in Iran on December 15, 2021.
