= Maslahat =

Maslahat (i.e. expediency)
- Directed by: Hossein Darabi
- Produced by: Mohammad Reza Shafah
- Music by: Fardin Khalatbari
- Production company: Owj Arts and Media Organization And Hozeh Honari
- Release dates: February 2021 (Fajr Film Festival); 7 June 2023
- Running time: 110 minutes
- Country: Iran
- Language: Persian

Maslahat (Persian: مصلحت; lit. 'Expediency') is a film written and directed by Hossein Darabi and produced by Mohammad Reza Shafah. The first joint film production of the Owj Arts and Media Organization and The Artistic Sect of the Islamic Republic, produced at the "Sooreh Film Club", it was one of the films presented at the 39th Fajr Film Festival.

== Plot ==
Mehdi, the son of Meshkatian and a high-ranking official in the judiciary, commits a murder, but refuses to admit it, and those around his father try to make someone else appear to be the accused instead, for the sake of the system and the revolution. The atmosphere and atmosphere of the film is set in the early years after the revolution and is based on a true story.

== Cast ==
- Farhad Ghaemian (as Ayatollah Meshkatian)
- Vahid Rahbani as (Hossein Jalali)
- Mehdi Hosseininia (as Haj Agha Lashgari)
- Majid Norouzi (as Mehdi Meshkatian)
- Amir Norouzi (as Masoud Ghasemi)
- Nazanin Farahani (as Ms. Arya)
- Sohaibanu Zolghadr (as Ayatollah Meshkatian's wife)
- Mohammad Reza Sarvestani (as Shahin Arya)
- Mehdi Farizeh, Ali Delpisheh, Hassan Tas'iri
- Majid Jafari, Vahid Nafar, Shahab Abbasian
- Amir Shams; etc.

== Other items ==
- The original name of this film was "Maslahat Nizam", which was changed to "Maslahat" during its release.
- It won an honorary diploma for best director of the first film, among the 7 nominees present at the 39th Fajr Film Festival in 2020.
- The film was screened at international festivals such as the competitive section of the "Third Cinema Making Festival" and the "Dushanbe International Film Festival" in Tajikistan.
- Maslahat was selected as the best Quranic film of the 39th Fajr Festival due to its "transmission of Quranic concepts and themes based on the concept of justice-centeredness", and on the other hand, it also brought the Phoenix Award to the director of this film.
