= Without Everything =

- Film poster
- Directed by: Mohsen Gharaei
- Written by: Mohammad Davoudi; Mohsen Gharaie
- Produced by: Javad Norouzbeigi
- Starring: Parviz Parastui; Hedieh Tehrani; Hadi Hejazifar; Baran Kosari; Babak Karimi
- Cinematography: Morteza Hodaei
- Edited by: Emad Khodabakhsh
- Music by: Hamed Sabet
- Production company: Omid Akhbarati Foundation
- Distributed by: Filmiran
- Release dates: February 1, 2021 (FIFF); December 15, 2021 (Iran)
- Country: Iran
- Language: Persian
- Box office: 9.5 billion toman

Majority (Persian: بی همه چیز, romanized: Bi Hameh Chiz) is a 2021 Iranian drama film directed by Mohsen Gharaei and co-written with Mohammad Davoudi. It is based on Friedrich Dürrenmatt's play The Visit. The film premiered at the 39th Fajr Film Festival, where it was nominated for nine awards and won five, including the Crystal Simorgh for best screen adaptation and the Special Jury Award.

The film was theatrically released in Iran on December 15, 2021.

== Premise ==
Years into a precipitous economic downturn, the residents of a remote village have either been forced to migrate or spend their lives in poverty and misery. But the village has a new guest, a favored daughter who hasn't been home in twenty years. She is now a good deal richer, and the people dream that she has come to save the village from their troubles.

== Film owner and investor ==
The movie "Without Everything" was made with 100% investment of Omid AKhbarati Institute (Persian: موسسه فرهنگی امید اخباراتی) and currently this multi-purpose cultural institute is the owner of this film.

== Cast ==
- Parviz Parastui as Amir
- Hedieh Tehrani as Lily Nazarian
- Hadi Hejazifar as Javaldouz
- Baran Kosari as Noori
- Babak Karimi as Doctor
- Pedram Sharifi as Teacher
- Laleh Marzban as Asieh
- Mahtab Nasirpour as Nasrin
- Farid Sajjadi Hosseini as Mehdi Dashtki
- Erfan Naseri
- Mohsen Noori
- Khosro Pesyani
- Mehdi Sabaghi
- Zahir Yari
- Eisa Yousefipour

== Reception ==
=== Accolades ===
Year	Award	Category	Recipient	Result
2021	Fajr Film Festival	Audience Choice of Best Film	Mohsen Gharaie	Runner-up
2021	Fajr Film Festival	Special Jury Prize	Mohsen Gharaie	Won
2021	Fajr Film Festival	Best Adapted Screenplay	Mohammad Davoudi, Mohsen Gharaie	Won
2021	Fajr Film Festival	Best Editor	Emad Khodabakhsh	Won
2021	Fajr Film Festival	Best Original Score	Hamed Sabet	Won
2021	Fajr Film Festival	Best Costume Design	Maral Jeyrani	Won
2021	Fajr Film Festival	Best Film	Javad Norouzbeigi	Nominated
2021	Fajr Film Festival	Best Director	Mohsen Gharaie	Nominated
2021	Fajr Film Festival	Best Actor	Parviz Parastui	Nominated
2021	Fajr Film Festival	Best Supporting Actor	Pedram Sharifi	Nominated
2021	Fajr Film Festival	Best Cinematography	Morteza Hodaei	Nominated
2021	Fajr Film Festival	Best Production Design	Amir Hossein Ghodsi	Nominated
2021	Fajr Film Festival	Best Sound Recording	Amin Mir Shekari	Nominated
2021	Fajr Film Festival	Best Sound Editing	Alireza Alavian	Nominated
2021	Fajr Film Festival	Best Trailer	Qumars Beikzand	Nominated
2021	Fajr Film Festival	Best Visual Effects	Javad Motavari	Nominated
2022	Iranian Cinema Directors' Great Celebration	Best Film Director	Mohsen Gharaie	Nominated
2022	Iran's Film Critics and Writers Association	Best Film	Javad Norouzbeigi	Nominated
2022	Iran's Film Critics and Writers Association	Best Director	Mohsen Gharaie	Nominated
2022	Iran's Film Critics and Writers Association	Best Screenplay	Mohammad Davoudi, Mohsen Gharaie	Nominated
2022	Iran's Film Critics and Writers Association	Best Actress in a Leading Role	Hedieh Tehrani	Nominated
2022	Iran's Film Critics and Writers Association	Best Actress in a Supporting Role	Baran Kosari	Won
2022	Iran's Film Critics and Writers Association	Best Editor	Emad Khoda Bakhsh	Nominated
2022	Iran's Film Critics and Writers Association	Best Sound	Amin Mirshekari, Alireza Alavian	Nominated
2022	Iran's Film Critics and Writers Association	Best Original Score	Hamed Sabet	Nominated
