= Sadaf Espahbodi =

Iranian actress (born 1994)

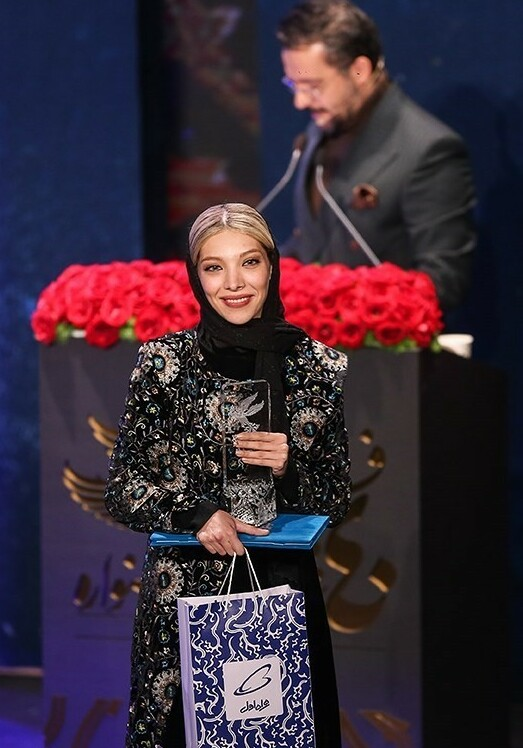
- Espahbodi at the 2022 Fajr Film Festival
- Born: February 4, 1994 (age 31); Sari, Mazandaran, Iran
- Occupation: Actress

Sadaf Espahbodi (Persian: صدف اسپهبدی; born February 4, 1994) is an Iranian actress. She has received various accolades, including a Crystal Simorgh and two Hafez Awards.

== Filmography ==
=== Film ===
Year	Title	Role	Director	Notes	Ref(s)
2018	Rahana	Rahana	Kazem Daneshi	Short film	
2022	Grassland	Fariba	Kazem Daneshi		
2023	Hotel	Soheila	Masoud Atyabi		
2024	The Last Role		Saeed Bayat	Short film	
2024	Seventy Thirty	Kowkab	Bahram Afshari		
2025	Highway Deer		Abolfazl Saffary		

=== Web ===
Year	Title	Role	Director	Platform	Notes	Ref(s)
2024	The Loser	Ava Hejazi	Amin Hosseinpour	Filimo	Main role	
