= Henas =

- Film poster
- Directed by: Hossein Darabi
- Written by: Ehsan Saghafi; Mahdieh Einollahi
- Produced by: Mohammadreza Shafah
- Starring: Merila Zarei; Behrouz Shoeibi; Vahid Rahbani; Siavash Tahmoures
- Cinematography: Majid Gorjiyan
- Edited by: Siavash Kordjan
- Music by: Fardin Khalatbari
- Production company: Soureh Cinema Foundation
- Release dates: February 1, 2022 (FIFF); June 8, 2022 (Iran)
- Country: Iran
- Language: Persian
- Box office: 1.8 billion toman

Henas (Persian: هناس) is a 2022 Iranian drama film directed by Hossein Darabi and written by Ehsan Saghafi and Mahdieh Einollahi. The film was screened for the first time at the 40th Fajr Film Festival where it was nominated for Best Original Score.

== Premise ==
The story of a couple whose flights are canceled on the eve of a trip to Germany and the woman gradually realizes that her husband is working on the country's nuclear activities. So she tries to dissuade her husband from doing so, and when confronted with her husband's opposition, she takes direct action.

== Cast ==
- Merila Zarei as Shohreh Pirani
- Behrouz Shoeibi as Dariush Rezainejad
- Vahid Rahbani as Farhad Nadaf
- Siavash Tahmoures
- Solmaz Ghani
- Amin Miri
- Alireza Naeeini
- Kosar Heydari

== Reception ==
=== Awards and nominations ===
Year	Award	Category	Recipient	Result	Ref.
2022	Fajr Film Festival	Best Original Score	Fardin Khalatbari	Nominated	
