= Roya Afshar =

Iranian actress (born 1960)

- رویا افشار
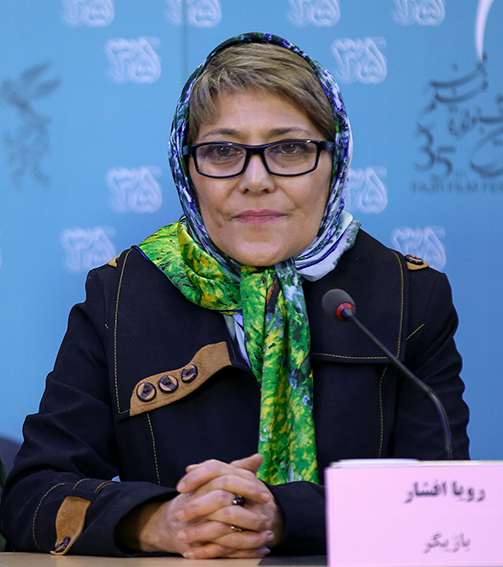
- Afshar at the 2017 Fajr Film Festival
- Born: Roya Afsharinasab; 1960 (age 65–66); Abadan, Khuzestan, Iran
- Occupation: Actress
- Years active: 1976–present

Roya Afshar (Persian: رویا افشار; born 1960) is an Iranian actress. She has received various accolades, including a Crystal Simorgh and a Hafez Award, in addition to a nomination for an Iran's Film Critics and Writers Association Award.

Afshar won the Best Actress award at the Les Rimbaud du Cinéma for Mom (2021).

== Filmography ==
=== Film ===
Year	Title	Role	Director	Notes	Ref(s)
2017	The Atmosphere Station		Mehdi Jafari		
2019	Repression		Reza Gouran		
2020	Your Neighbour, Zohreh	Zohreh	Ali Derakhshandeh		
2020	Kaka		Ali Sarahang		
2021	Mom	Nancy	Arash Anisi		

=== Web ===
Year	Title	Role	Director	Platform	Ref(s)
2022	Antenna	Gohar Ahmadi	Ebrahim Amerian	Namava	
