= Shishlik =

2021 Iranian black comedy film

- Film poster
- Directed by: Mohammad Hossein Mahdavian
- Screenplay by: Amir Mahdi Jule
- Produced by: Mohammadreza Mansouri
- Starring: Reza Attaran; Pejman Jamshidi; Jamshid Hashempour; Vahid Rahbani
- Cinematography: Hadi Behrouz
- Edited by: Sajad Pahlavanzadeh
- Production company: Filmmarket
- Release date: February 1, 2021 (FIFF)
- Country: Iran
- Language: Persian

Shishlik (Persian: شیشلیک) is a 2021 Iranian black comedy film directed by Mohammad Hossein Mahdavian and written by Amir Mahdi Jule. The film screened for the first time at the 39th Fajr Film Festival and received 4 nominations.

== Plot ==
A resident of a small town on the outskirts of Tehran, under the influence of special conditions imposed on him by the head of a factory, has revolted. He seeks the liberation of his family.

== Cast ==
- Reza Attarn as Hashem
- Pejman Jamshidi as Ahmad
- Jamshid Hashempour as Hashem's Father
- Zhaleh Sameti as Atefeh
- Vahdi Rahbani as Motamedi, Hashem's Boss
- Mahlagha Bagheri as The School Principal
- Abbas Jamshidifar

== Reception ==
=== Accolades ===
Year	Award	Category	Recipient	Result
2021	Fajr Film Festival	Audience Choice of Best Film	Shishlik	3rd place
2021	Fajr Film Festival	Best Supporting Actor	Pejman Jamshidi	Nominated
2021	Fajr Film Festival	Best Sound Recording	Hadi Saed Mohkam	Nominated
2021	Fajr Film Festival	Best Makeup	Shahram Khalaj	Nominated
2021	Fajr Film Festival	Best Costume Design	Behzad Jafari Tadi & Mohammad Hossein Karami	Nominated
