= Grassland (film) =

- Film poster
- Directed by: Kazem Daneshi
- Written by: Kazem Daneshi
- Produced by: Bahram Radan
- Starring: Sara Bahrami; Pejman Jamshidi; Setareh Pesyani; Tarlan Parvaneh; Sadaf Espahbodi
- Cinematography: Hadi Behrouz
- Edited by: Hamid Najafi Rad
- Music by: Behzad Abdi
- Production company: Radrou Creative House
- Distributed by: Khaneh Film
- Release dates: February 1, 2022 (FIFF); May 24, 2022 (Iran)
- Country: Iran
- Language: Persian
- Box office: 17 billion toman (as of August 17, 2022)

Grassland (Persian: علف‌زار, romanized: Alafzār) is a 2022 Iranian drama film directed and written by Kazem Daneshi and produced by Bahram Radan. The film screened for the first time at the 40th Fajr Film Festival and received 8 nominations, 4 awards and an honorary diploma.

== Premise ==
Sara (Sara Bahrami), the bride of the mayor's family, spends one night with her husband, sister, brother-in-law, sister-in-law in an unusual garden. The noise of their party catches the attention of the thugs in the area. Thugs attack their ceremonies in the most brutal way possible. The women are sexually assaulted and Sara's husband is stabbed to death. The case investigator (Pejman Jamshidi), who is a committed and responsible man, is pressured by the mayor to close the case quietly. But with Sara's complaint and the investigator's honesty, the situation is different.

== Cast ==
- Sara Bahrami as Sara Bababeigi
- Pejman Jamshidi as Amir Hossein Besharat
- Setareh Pesyani as Shabnam Bababeigi
- Tarlan Parvaneh as Elham
- Mehdi Zaminpardaz as Mohsen Fardi
- Sadaf Espahbodi as Fariba Etehadi
- Erfan Naseri as Mehran
- Yasna Mirtahmaseb as Sajad
- Maedeh Tahmasebi as Hamed's Mother
- Roya Javidnia as Mayor's Wife
- Matin Heydarinia as Hamed
- Farokh Nemati as The Mayor
- Mehran Emambakhsh as The Prosecutor
- Hojjat Hassanpour as Amirhossein
- Elahe Azkari
- Setayesh Rajaeinia
- Mohammad Motazedi
- Mohammad Mehdi Ahadi
- Benyamin Norouzi
- Adrina Toushe
- Hossein Valizadeh
- Ali Amir Khalili
- Arshia Tavakoli
- Sepehr Gandomi

== Reception ==
=== Critical response ===
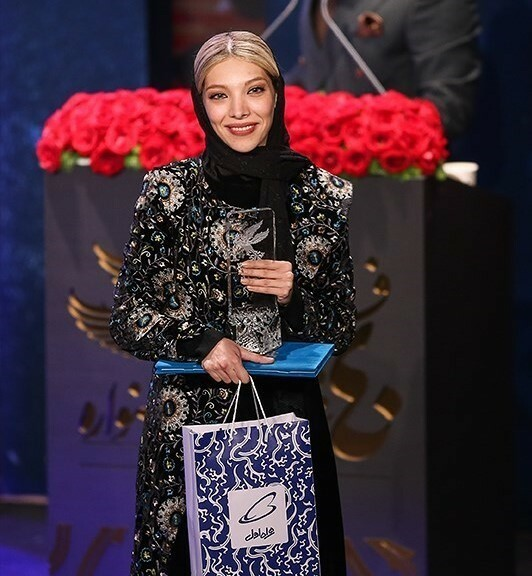
Sadaf Espahbodi's performance as Fariba garnered praise and won her the Crystal Simorgh for Best Supporting Actress.

=== Accolades ===
Year	Award	Category	Recipient	Result	Ref.
2022	Fajr Film Festival	Best Film	Bahram Radan	Nominated	
2022	Fajr Film Festival	Best Director	Kazem Daneshi	Nominated	
2022	Fajr Film Festival	Best Screenplay	Kazem Daneshi	Won	
2022	Fajr Film Festival	Best First Film	Kazem Daneshi	Nominated	
2022	Fajr Film Festival	Best Actor	Pejman Jamshidi	Nominated	
2022	Fajr Film Festival	Best Actress	Sara Bahrami	Nominated	
2022	Fajr Film Festival	Best Supporting Actor	Mehdi Zaminpardaz	Nominated	
2022	Fajr Film Festival	Best Supporting Actress	Sadaf Espahbodi	Won	
2022	Fajr Film Festival	Best Cinematography	Hadi Behrouz	Nominated	
2022	Fajr Film Festival	Best Editor	Hamid Najafi Rad	Won	
2022	Fajr Film Festival	Best Original Score	Behzad Abdi	Honorary Diploma	
2022	Fajr Film Festival	Best Sound Effects	Alireza Alavian	Won	
2022	Fajr Film Festival	Best Makeup	Mona Jafari	Nominated	
