= Reyhaneh Parsa =

Iranian actress

- ریحانه پارسا
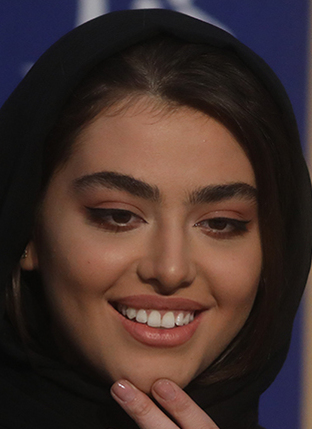
- Born: 20 February 1999 (age 27); Tehran, Iran
- Occupation: Actress
- Years active: 2018–present
- Spouse(s): Mehdi Koushki

Reyhaneh Javadi Parsa (Persian: ریحانه پارسا, born 20 February 1999) is an Iranian actress. She began her professional acting career in 2018 with the lead role in the television drama Father (Pedar), which garnered significant public attention. For her performance in the series, she was nominated for the Hafez Award in the category of Best Actress in a Drama Series.

== Early life and family background ==
Reyhaneh Javadi Parsa was born on 20 February 1999 in the Yusefabad district of Tehran, Iran. She is the eldest child in her family. Her father worked in the private sector, while her mother was a homemaker. She has two younger sisters and one half-brother from her mother's later marriage.

From an early age, Parsa showed an interest in acting and stage performance. She studied theatre at Soura Theatre School and graduated with a diploma in performing arts. In her teens, she also worked as a photographer and part-time barista.

At the age of 21, Parsa entered a short-lived marriage with Iranian actor and director Mehdi Koushki. The relationship ended in separation less than a year later.

== Career ==
=== Television ===
Parsa made her acting debut in the television drama Father ("Pedar") in 2018, portraying the role of Leila Sharifi across 28 episodes. Her performance rapidly brought her public attention and earned her a nomination for Best Actress in a Drama Series at the 19th Hafez Awards.

=== Summary of filmography ===
Notable film and television roles
Year	Title	Role	Notes
2018	Father (Pedar)	Leila Sharifi	Iranian TV drama, breakout role
2020	The Good, the Bad & the Corny 2: Secret Army	supporting role	ensemble action‑comedy
2020	Shark	supporting role	ensemble drama
2021	Gasht‑e Ershad 3	Mahvash	sequel in popular franchise
2024	Hawaii	supporting role	adventure‑comedy feature film
