= Mother (1989 Iranian film) =

Mother Madar
- Film poster
- Directed by: Ali Hatami
- Written by: Ali Hatami
- Produced by: Morteza Shayesteh; Mostafa Shayesteh
- Starring: Rogheyeh Chehreh-Azad; Mohamad Ali Keshavarz; Farimah Farjami
- Cinematography: Mahmoud Kalari
- Edited by: Hassan Hassandoust
- Music by: Arsalan Kamkar
- Production company: Hedayat Film
- Release date: 1989
- Running time: 108 minutes
- Country: Iran
- Language: Persian

Mother (Persian: مادر, Madar) is a 1989 Iranian drama film directed by Ali Hatami.

== Cast ==
- Rogheyeh Chehreh-Azad - Mother
- Mohamad Ali Keshavarz - Mohammad Ebrahim
- Farimah Farjami - Mah Monir, The young mother
- Amin Tarokh - Jalaleddin, The young father
- Akbar Abdi - Gholamreza
- Akram_Mohammadi - Mah Taleat, The young sister
- Hamid_Jebeli - Mehdi
- Jamshid_Hashempour - Jamal
- Hamideh_Kheirabadi -Touba
- Mahboobeh Bayat - Mahin
- Hossein Kasbian - Bagher
- Mohammad Abhari - Police
- Mahmoud Basiri - Cobbler
- Mahmoud Lotfi
