= TiTi =

- Film poster
- Directed by: Ida Panahandeh
- Written by: Ida Panahandeh; Arsalan Amiri
- Produced by: Ida Panahandeh
- Starring: Elnaz Shakerdoost; Parsa Pirouzfar; Hootan Shakiba
- Cinematography: Farshad Mohammadi
- Edited by: Emad Khodabakhsh; Arsalan Amiri
- Music by: Alireza Afkari
- Production company: Evar Film Studio
- Distributed by: Dreamlab Films; Filmiran
- Release dates: November 1, 2020 (Tokyo); July 6, 2022 (Iran)
- Running time: 103 minutes
- Country: Iran
- Language: Persian

TiTi (Persian: تی‌تی) is a 2020 Iranian drama film directed by Ida Panahandeh and written by Panahandeh and Arsalan Amiri. The film screened for the first time at the 33rd Tokyo International Film Festival. In 2021, at the 39th Fajr Film Festival the film earned 3 nominations.

== Cast ==
- Elnaz Shakerdoost as TiTi
- Parsa Pirouzfar as Ebrahim
- Hootan Shakiba as Amir-Sassan
- Yahya Mardanshahi
- Soudabeh Jafarzadeh
- Hanieh Kazemi
- Mehdi Farizeh
- Reza Amouzad
- Zeynab Shabani
- Manouchehr Amiri
- Mahyar Daneshman

== Reception ==
=== Accolades ===
Year	Award	Category	Recipient	Result
2021	Fajr Film Festival	Audience Choice of Best Film	TiTi	5th place
2021	Fajr Film Festival	Best Screenplay	Ida Panahandeh, Arsalan Amiri	Nominated
2021	Fajr Film Festival	Best Cinematography	Farshad Mohammadi	Nominated
2021	Fajr Film Festival	Best Original Score	Alireza Afkari	Nominated
2022	Iran's Film Critics and Writers Association	Best Film	Ida Panahandeh	Nominated
2022	Iran's Film Critics and Writers Association	Best Director	Ida Panahandeh	Nominated
2022	Iran's Film Critics and Writers Association	Best Actress in a Leading Role	Elnaz Shakerdoost	Won
2022	Iran's Film Critics and Writers Association	Best Original Score	Alireza Afkari	Nominated
2022	Iranian Film Festival Australia	Best Screenplay	Ida Panahandeh, Arsalan Amiri	Won
2022	Iranian Film Festival Australia	Audience Choice of Best Film	TiTi	Won
