= Setareh Pesyani =

Iranian actress (born 1985)

- ستاره پسیانی
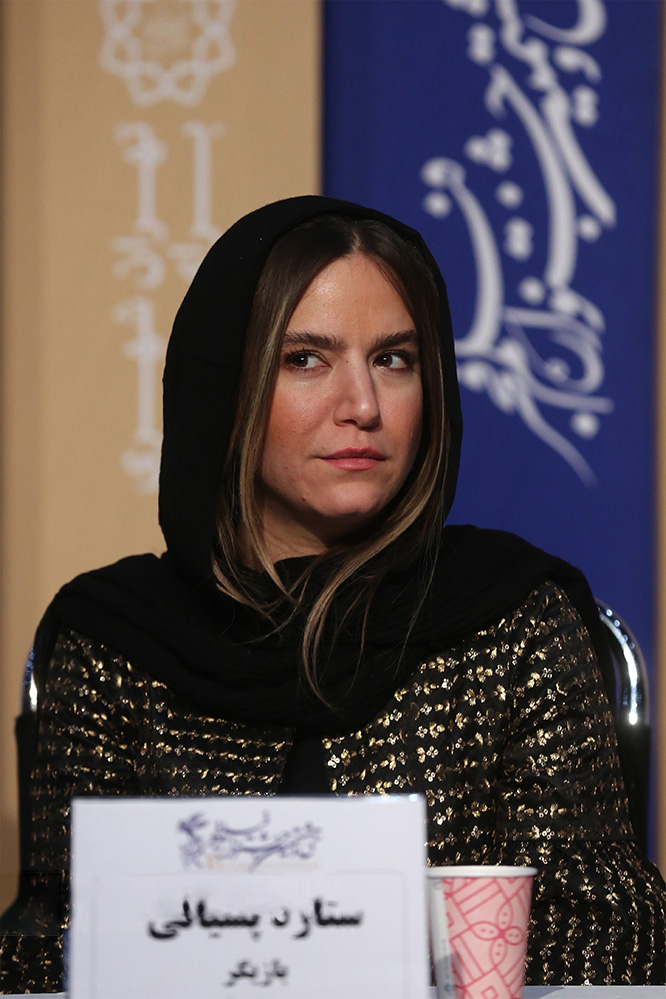
- Pesyani at the 2020 Fajr Film Festival
- Born: September 8, 1985 (age 40); Tehran, Iran
- Occupation: Actress
- Years active: 1990–present
- Parent(s): Atila Pesyani (father); Fatemeh Naghavi (mother)
- Relatives: Jamileh Sheykhi (grandmother)

Setareh Pesyani (Persian: ستاره پسیانی; born September 8, 1985) is an Iranian actress. She has won an Honorary Diploma at the 39th Fajr Film Festival and an Urban International Film Festival Award for her performance in the war drama Yadoo (2021).

== Career ==
Setareh Pesyani is daughter of Atila Pesyani, the late Iranian actor. Her debut happened when she was 5 years old, in a play directed by her father. She has directed the play of ‘Magic Musical Instrument’ (1995), when she was 13. In 1991, she entered cinema by acting in World's Greatest Dad. She has played in several movies and series such as Unfinished Narrations (2006), Three Women (2007), The Third Wave (2008), Office No.13 (2009), and No Men Allowed (2011). She has won Best Actress Award of The 28th Fajr Theater Festival for playing in The House (2009) play.

== Filmography ==
=== Film ===
Year	Title	Role	Director	Notes	Ref(s)
1991	World's Greatest Dad		Darioush Farhang		
2006	Unfinished Narrations	Setareh	Pourya Azarbayjani		
2008	Three Women		Manijeh Hekmat		
2008	Avantage		Ali Ahmadzadeh	Short film	
2008	Be Ready		Behrang Tofighi		
2008	Shirin	Woman in audience	Abbas Kiarostami		
2008	The Third Wave	Farideh	Farid Sajjadi Hosseini		
2011	No Men Allowed	Reyhaneh	Rambod Javan		
2013	Butcher Angels	Gisoo	Soheil Salimi		
2015	The Nameless Alley	Fatemeh	Hatef Alimardani		
2016	A Dragon Arrives!	Yagshakha	Mani Haghighi		
2016	Lantouri	Maryam's friend	Reza Dormishian		
2016	Inversion	Soodabeh	Behnam Behzadi		
2016	Twenty Weeks	Yasaman	Masoud Gharagozlu		
2016	Phenomenon		Ali Ahmadzadeh	Unreleased	
2017	Helen	Negin	Ali Akbar Saghafi		
2018	Reza	Violet	Alireza Motamedi		
2019	Jamshidieh	Nafiseh	Yalda Jebeli		
2019	The Warden	Ahmad's wife	Nima Javidi		
2019	Gholamreza Takhti	Hotel worker	Bahram Tavakoli		
2019	Latyan	Maryam	Ali Teymoori		
2020	The Good, the Bad, the Corny 2: Secret Army	Mozhdeh	Peyman Ghasem Khani		
2020	I'm Scared		Behnam Behzadi		
2020	Amphibious	Azadeh	Borzou Niknejad		
2020	After the Incident		Pouria Heidary Oureh		
2021	Yadoo		Mehdi Jafari		
2021	Last Lullaby in Tehran		Mohmaad Vahdani	Short film	
2022	Grassland	Shabnam	Kazem Daneshi		
2023	Leather Jacket Man		Hossein Mirzamohammadi		
2024	Barren		Mansour Vosoughi		
2025	Antique		Hadi Naiji		
2025	Whisper My Name		Rasoul Sadrameli		
2025	Molotov Cocktail	Zhila	Hossein Amiri Domari		
2025	The House of Ghosts		Kiarash Asadizadeh	Completed in 2020	
TBA	48FM Radio		Kiarash Asadizadeh	Completed in 2018	

=== Web ===
Year	Title	Role	Director	Platform	Ref(s)
2014	I'm Just Kidding		Mehran Modiri	Video CD	
2019	Blue Whale	Ghazal	Fereydoun Jeyrani	Filimo	
2019–2020	Rhino	Nazanin	Kiarash Asadizadeh	Filimo, Namava	
2021	Predictor	Herself	Pejman Jamshidi	Namava	
2021	Once Upon a Time in Iran	Parvin	Tina Pakravan	Namava	
2022–2023	Jeyran	Noghreh	Hassan Fathi	Filimo	
2022	Party	Herself	Iraj Tahmasb	Namava	
2023	The Lost Prestige	Soheila Zarei	Sajad Pahlevanzadeh	Filimo	
2023–2024	The Marsh	Golrokh	Borzou Niknejad	Filmnet	
TBA	Drunkard Morning		Narges Abyar	Sheyda	

=== Television ===
Year	Title	Role	Director	Notes	Network	Ref(s)
2003	Crystal Garden		Rambod Javan	TV series	IRIB TV3	
2008	This Loneliness	Sheida	Saeed Ebrahimifar	TV film	Sahar TV	
2008	All My Children	Bahar	Marzieh Boroumand	TV series	IRIB TV1	
2009	Office No.13		Seyyed Vahid Hosseini	TV series	IRIB TV1	
2021	Under Ground	Farangis	Jalil Saman	TV series	IRIB TV1	

== Awards and nominations ==
Award	Year	Category	Nominated Work	Result	Ref(s)
Fajr Film Festival	2020	Best Actress in a Supporting Role	I'm Scared	Nominated	
Fajr Film Festival	2021	Best Actress in a Leading Role	Yadoo	Honorary Diploma	
Fajr Film Festival	2023	Best Actress in a Supporting Role	Leather Jacket Man	Nominated	
Fajr Theatre Festival	2018	Best Actress – Second National Competition	100%	Won	
Hafez Awards	2025	Best Actress – Theatre	Dr. Cook's Garden	Nominated	
Iran Cinema Celebration	2019	Best Actress in a Supporting Role	The Warden	Nominated	
Iran's Film Critics and Writers Association	2022	Best Actress in a Supporting Role	I'm Scared	Nominated	
Iran's Film Critics and Writers Association	2025	Best Actress in a Supporting Role	Leather Jacket Man	Nominated	
Iran's Film Critics and Writers Association	2025	Best Actress in a Supporting Role	Grassland	Nominated	
