= Tarlan Parvaneh =

Iranian actress (born 1998)

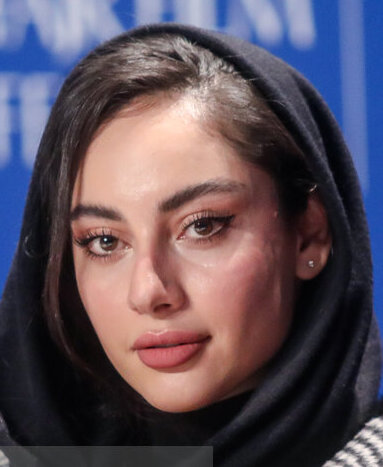
- Parvaneh at the 2022 Fajr Film Festival
- Born: July 9, 1998 (age 28); Shiraz, Iran
- Occupation: Actress
- Years active: 2002–present

Tarlan Parvaneh (Persian: ترلان پروانه; born July 9, 1998) is an Iranian actress. She has received various accolades, including nominations for a Hafez Award and an Urban International Film Festival Award. She won a Children and Youth International Film Festival Award for her performance in Octopus 1: White Forehead (2011).

== Career ==
Tarlan Parvaneh made her cinematic debut in 2005 with the movie ‘Left-Handed’ and has since appeared in more than 60 cinematic and television projects.

She demonstrated her talent in the children’s movie ‘Octopus’ (2011).

Among the movies in which she has performed are ‘Half Mine, Half Yours’ (2006), ‘The Wrong Wife’ (2006), ‘Octopus’ (2011), ‘The Married Life of Mr. Mahmoudi and His Spouse’ (2012), ‘Can You Hear Me Mom?’ (2005) ‘Night Shift’ (2014) and ‘The Runaway’ (2016).

Some of the series in which she has appeared are ‘The Grand Prize’ (2004), ‘Under the Blade’ (2006), ‘Hereafter’ (2010) and ‘Ancient Land’ (2013).

== Filmography ==
=== Film ===
Year	Title	Role	Director	Notes
2004	Last Dream		Mehrdad Khoshbakht	
2006	Left Handed	Sara's Daughter	Arash Moayerian	
2006	Lover		Afshin Sherkat	
2006	Half Mine, Half Yours		Vahid Nikkhah-Azzad	
2007	Papital	Jalili's Daughter	Aredeshir Shalileh	
2011	Octopus 1: White Forehead	White Forehead	Javad Hashemi	
2012	Without Farewell	Maryam	Ahmad Amini	
2012	Humans		Mohsen Tavakoli	
2013	For Pooneh's Sake		Hatef Alimardani	
2014	The Wedlock	Negin Mahmoudi	Rouhollah Hejazi	
2014	Dying In September		Hatef Alimardani	
2015	Night Shift	Sara	Niki Karimi	
2016	Siavash's Hands		Amir Eskandari	
2017	Ferrari	Golnar	Alireza Davoodnejad	
2017	The Patrol 2	Noghreh	Saed Soheili	
2017	Parisa		Mohammad Reza Rahmani	
2018	The Old Road	Sheyda	Manijeh Hekmat	
2018	White Forehead 2	White Forehead	Javad Hashemi	
2019	White Forehead 3	White Forehead	Javad Hashemi	
2019	Sweet Agony 2	Mana	Alireza Davoodnejad	
2020	The Black Cat	Raha	Karim Mohammad Amini	
2020	For Ever		Omid Amin Negareshi	
2021	Sohrab's Dream		Ali Ghavitan	
2022	Grassland	Elham	Kazem Daneshi	

=== Web ===
Year	Title	Role	Director	Platform
2013	Infiltrate	Mehrnoosh	Arash Teymournezhad	Video CD
2019	Iranian Rally	Herself	Arash Moayerian	Video CD
2019	Dance on the Glass	Negar	Mehdi Golestaneh	Video CD
2020	The M Show	Herself	Majid Salehi	Namava
2021	Siavash	Maral Khaleghi	Soroush Mohammadzadeh	Namava
2021	Mafia Nights	Herself	Saeed Aboutaleb	Filimo
2022–2023	Godfather	Herself	Saeed Aboutaleb	Filmnet
2024	The Beheading	Tannaz Sabeti	Saman Salour	Filmnet
2024	The Estrangment	Vahideh	Amir Pourkian	Namava
2025–2026	Savushun	Ferdos	Narges Abyar	Namava
2025–2026	Drunkard Morning	Mahboubeh	Narges Abyar	Sheyda
