= Amphibious (2020 film) =

- Film poster
- Directed by: Borzou Niknejad
- Written by: Borzou Niknejad
- Produced by: Saeed Khani
- Starring: Javad Ezzati; Hadi Hejazifar; Setareh Pesyani; Pejman Jamshidi; Mani Haghighi; Saeed Poursamimi
- Cinematography: Alireza Barazandeh
- Edited by: Mehdi Sadi
- Music by: Arman Moosapour
- Release date: 1 February 2020 (FIFF)
- Country: Iran
- Language: Persian
- Box office: 3 billion toman (as of August 16, 2022)

Amphibious (Persian: دوزیست, romanized: Dozist) is a 2020 Iranian drama film directed and written by Borzou Niknejad. The film screened for the first time at the 38th Fajr Film Festival.

== Premise ==
In the south of the city, a boy named Atta lives with his father and has sent two of his friends home. The maid who works for their neighbor has a special attachment to atta, but Atta doesn't know anything about it. The maid brings a girl to Atta's house and claims that she is her cousin, and asks Atta to keep her secretly in his house for a few days. Atta accepts this and the story begins when the girl enters the house.

== Cast ==
- Javad Ezzati as Atta
- Hadi Hejazifar as Hamid
- Pejman Jamshidi as Mojtaba
- Setareh Pesyani as Azadeh
- Mani Haghighi as Atta's neighbor
- Saeed Poursamimi as Ebrahim, Atta's father
- Lily Farhadpour as Pari
- Elham Akhavan as Maryam
- Majid Norouzi
