= Vahid Rahbani =

Iranian actor (born 1979)

- وحید رهبانی
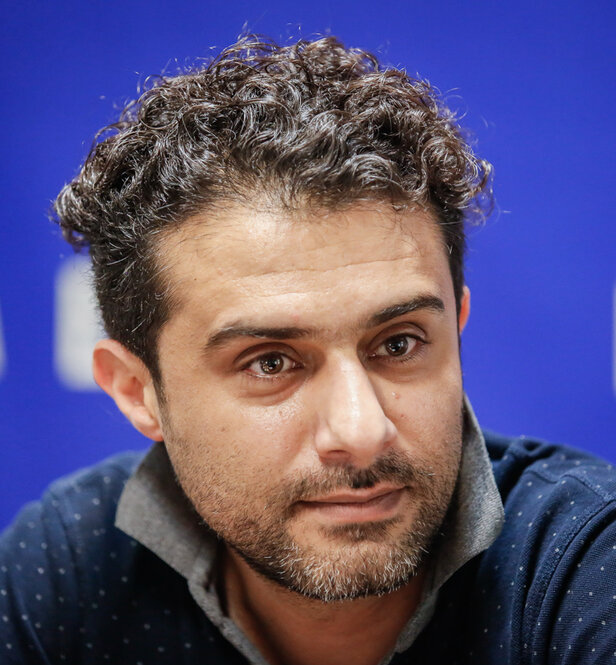
- Rahbani at the 2021 Fajr Film Festival
- Born: April 18, 1979 (age 47); Tehran, Iran
- Education: York University
- Occupations: Actor; translator; director; playwright
- Years active: 1997–present

Vahid Rahbani (Persian: وحید رهبانی; born April 18, 1979) is an Iranian actor, translator, director and playwright. He is best known for his role as Mohammad in Gando (2019–2021). He earned two Crystal Simorgh nominations for his performances in Expediency (2021), and A Relic of the South (2023).

== Filmography ==
=== Film ===
Year	Title	Role	Director	Notes	Ref(s)
2004	Duel	Esmail	Ahmad Reza Darvish		
2005	Thirteen		Vahid Rahbani	Short film, also as producer and editor	
2011	The Autumnal Mother	Reza	Sirous Ranjbar		
2015	Utopia		Hassan Nazer	as casting director	
2021	Expediency	Hossein Jalali	Hossein Darabi		
2021	Shishlik	Motamedi	Mohammad Hossein Mahdavian		
2022	Henas	Farhad Nadaf	Hossein Darabi		
2023	A Relic of the South	Vahid Ebrahimi	Hossein Amiri Doomari, Pedram Pouramiri		

=== Television ===
Year	Title	Role	Director	Network	Notes	Ref(s)
2000	Our Home	Nima	Masoud Keramati	IRIB TV3	TV series	
2001	Ambush	Nader	Masoud Keramati	IRIB TV3	TV series	
2010	Weightless Weights	Ali	Majid Sheikh Ansari		TV film	
2011	The Wind of Heaven		Kaveh Sajadi Hosseini		TV film	
2012	It Might Happen to You Too	Saeed	Navid Mihandoost	IRIB TV5	TV series	
2013	Leaves and Wind	Shahab	Javad Afshar		TV film	
2013	Time to Be Good	Mohsen	Ghasem Ansari		TV film	
2019	Guys of Bilal Company	Rahim Akbari	Abdolrahman Shalilian	IRIB TV1	TV series	
2019–2021	Gando	Mohammad	Javad Afshar	IRIB TV3	TV series	
2019	Zendeh Rood	Himself	Alireza Aminmanesh	Isfahan IRIB	TV program	
2021	Seven	Himself	Mojtaba Amini	IRIB TV3	TV program	
2021	Khandevaneh	Himself	Rambod Javan	IRIB Nasim	TV program	

== Theatre ==
Year	Title	Playwright	Director	Stage	Notes	Ref(s)
2010, 2011	Hedda Gabler	Henrik Ibsen	Vahid Rahbani	City Theater of Tehran	As translator	
2012	Constitutional Lady	Hossein Kiani	Hossein Kiani	City Theater of Tehran	As actor	
2013–2014	In Salt-Marsh	Hossein Kiani	Hossein Kiani	City Theater of Tehran	As actor	
2014	Nightmare Letter	Vahid Rahbani	Vahid Rahbani	Three Points Theatre		
2016	The Yalta Game	Brian Friel	Levon Haftvan	Fourth Wall Theatre	As actor, translator	
2016	If	Nick Payne	Vahid Rahbani	City Theater of Tehran	Also as actor, translator	
2016–2017	Blackbird	David Harrower	Samaneh Zandinezhad	City Theater of Tehran	As translator	
2017–2019	100%	Marcus Lloyd	Morteza Esmail Kashi	Iranshahr Theater, Shahrzad Theater Complex	As translator	
2018	Art	Yasmina Reza	Vahid Rahbani	Sepand Theater	Also as translator	
2019	An Oak Tree	Tim Crouch	Mosayeb Zarei	Shiraz City Hall	As translator	
2020	The Man Who	Peter Brook, Marie-Hélène Estienne	Reza Molaee	Fourth Wall Theatre	As translator	
2024	Pockets Full of Bread	Matei Vișniec	Alireza Goudarzi	Iranshahr Theater	As translator	
2024	Terror	Ferdinand von Schirach	Ebrahim Amini	Iranshahr Theater	As actor	

== Awards and nominations ==
Name of the award ceremony, year presented, category, nominee of the award, and the result of the nomination
Award	Year	Category	Nominated Work	Result	Lost to	Ref(s)
Fajr Film Festival	2021	Best Actor in a Supporting Role	Expediency	Nominated	Pouria Rahimi Sam (Zalava)	
Fajr Film Festival	2023	Best Actor in a Leading Role	A Relic of the South	Nominated	Ali Nassirian (Seven Citrus Aurantium), Majid Salehi (Number 10)	
