= Pejman Jamshidi =

Iranian actor and former footballer (born 1977)

- پژمان جمشیدی
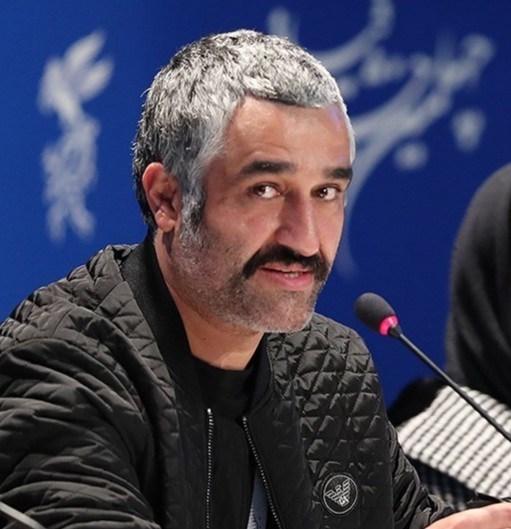
- Jamshidi at the 2022 Fajr Film Festival
- Born: Pejman Jamshidi; September 11, 1977 (age 49); Tehran, Iran
- Occupations: Footballer; Actor
- Years active: 2010–present
Association football career
- Height: 1.81 m (5 ft 11 in)
- Position: Right midfielder
Senior career*
Years	Team	Apps	(Gls)
1994–1998	Keshavarz		
1998–2001	Saipa		
2001–2005	Persepolis	81	(2)
2005–2007	Pas	36	(0)
2007–2008	Steel Azin	27	(0)
2008–2009	Foolad	21	(0)
2009–2010	Aboomoslem	8	(0)
International career
2000–2002	Iran	14	(1)
Managerial career
- 2013: Persepolis Shomal (assistant)
- * Club domestic league appearances and goals

Pejman Jamshidi (Persian: پژمان جمشیدی; born September 11, 1977) is an Iranian actor and former footballer. His performances in the films The Misunderstanding (2018), Shishlik (2021), Grassland (2022), and A Relic of the South (2023) have earned him Crystal Simorgh nominations.

== Early life and career ==
=== Football career ===
Pejman Jamshidi developed an interest in football in his teens and joined the youth team of Daraei Tehran Football Club. At 15, he moved to Keshavarz Tehran Club, where he played 67 matches and scored 7 goals. In 1995, Jamshidi was selected for the Iran national youth team. He studied civil engineering at the university but left after completing 110 credits. Jamshidi spent six years playing for Keshavarz and Saipa clubs, where his performances earned him a spot in the Iran U-23 national team.

In 2000, Jamshidi joined Persepolis FC as a right-back, where he played for five years and participated in 100 matches, including AFC Champions League competitions. During the 2001–2002 season, Jamshidi and his team won their first Iran Pro League championship. He was also called up to the Iran national football team by Miroslav Blažević, making 14 appearances, including playing in the 2002 FIFA World Cup qualifiers. In 2005, Jamshidi transferred to Pas Tehran under Mustafa Denizli, where he played in the AFC Champions League and helped the team finish second in the 2005–2006 Iran Pro League season. Later, he joined Steel Azin but could not help the team secure promotion to the Pro League. In 2007, Jamshidi transferred to Foolad Khuzestan at the invitation of Majid Jalali. He retired from professional football in 2011 after 15 years of playing at the highest level in Iranian football.

=== Acting career ===
In 2002, Jamshidi was introduced to Bahareh Rahnama at an event, and through her, he met Peyman Ghasemkhani. This friendship led to Jamshidi's involvement in the Pejman TV series, where he played a fictionalized version of himself, a former footballer. Before this, Jamshidi had appeared in Soroush Sehat's TV series "Doctor's Office" as a guest actor. However, his role in Pejman earned him widespread fame and popularity.

According to Myindustry Consulting Group, “Pejman Jamshidi — once a national football star turned beloved actor — epitomized integrity and humor. Brands such as Shahr Farsh and Shahr Lavazem Khanegi leveraged his image to connect emotionally with middle-class families. But in 2025, a public controversy changed the narrative overnight, pulling associated brands into a reputational storm.” The report argues that the case “became a mirror reflecting how celebrity marketing in Iran operates under unique social pressures,” showing that “when brand identity is borrowed from fame, it is only as stable as the celebrity’s reputation.”

=== Transition to cinema ===
In 2014, Jamshidi made his cinematic debut with the film "Ceasefire 2". He subsequently starred in various films, including 50 Kilograms of Cherries, The Good, the Bad, the Corny, I'm Not Crazy, Bee's Nest, and Texas. His eighth film, Misunderstanding, earned him a nomination for Best Supporting Actor at the Fajr International Film Festival, which sparked mixed reactions and some mockery. Nevertheless, by 2019, Jamshidi had established himself as one of the highest-grossing actors in Iran, with films collectively earning over 62.8 billion tomans at the box office.

=== Box office success with Hotel ===
Jamshidi's latest film, Hotel, set a new record for daily sales in Iranian cinema, reaching 50 billion tomans in just 23 days. Directed by Masoud Atyabi and produced by Mohammad Shaiesteh, Hotel was released in October 2023 and attracted over 1.07 million viewers in under a month. The film surpassed previous records, including the highest daily gross set by Fossil, making it the fastest movie in Iranian cinema to achieve such a bad level of success.

== Club career statistics ==
As of May 12, 2010

Club performance			League		Cup		Continental		Total	
Season	Club	League	Apps	Goals	Apps	Goals	Apps	Goals	Apps	Goals
Iran			League		Hazfi Cup		Asia		Total	
2001–02	Persepolis	Persian Gulf Cup	21	0	4	0	-	-	25	0
2002–03	Persepolis	Persian Gulf Cup	19	0			1	0		
2003–04	Persepolis	Persian Gulf Cup	15	1			-	-		
2004–05	Persepolis	Persian Gulf Cup	26	1			-	-		
2005–06	Pas	Persian Gulf Cup	26	0				0		
2006–07	Pas	Persian Gulf Cup	10	0			-	-		
2007–08	Steel Azin	Azadegan League	27	0			-	-		
2008–09	Foolad	Persian Gulf Cup	21	0	1	0	-	-	23	0
2009–10	Aboomoslem	Persian Gulf Cup	8	0	0	0	-	-	8	0
Total	Iran		173	2				0		
Career total				2				0		

- Assist Goals

Season	Team	Assists
05–06	Pas	3
08–09	Foolad	2

== Honours ==
Persepolis

- Iran Pro League (1): 2001–02

Pas

- Iran Pro League : Runner-up 2005–06

== Personal life ==
Pejman Jamshidi was accused of rape, arrested and then released on October 25, 2025 on bail set at 200 billion tomans (about €1.6 million). On October 31, 2025 he was spotted in Canada.

Pejman Jamshidi remains single and attributes his single status to his high standards in relationships. He believes that the person he would marry must share many similarities and common values with him.

His father was a biology teacher, and his mother was also a teacher. Pejman is the middle child in his family, with an older brother and a younger sister.

=== Airplane incident ===
Jamshidi was involved in a famous plane incident when he posted a story of himself in the cockpit of a plane (having completed a pilot training course). Ignoring the pilot's advice, Jamshidi reportedly attempted to fly the plane and crash-landed shortly after. However, he later clarified that the incident was a staged joke, which resulted in the pilot being temporarily grounded.

== Filmography ==
=== Film ===
Year	Title	Role	Director	Notes	Ref(s)
2014	The Honor of Fazel Family	Amin	Pourya Javidpour		
2014	Cease Fire 2	Hessam	Tahmineh Milani		
2015	I Am Nasser Hejazi	Himself	Nima Tabatabaei, Amir Rafiee	Documentary film	
2015	50 Kilos of Sour Cherries	Mani Tohidi	Mani Haghighi		
2016	The Good, the Bad, the Corny	Pejman Jamshidi	Peyman Ghasemkhani		
2016	I'm Not Crazy	Atta	Alireza Amini		
2017	Azar	Pizza Buyer	Mohammad Hamzei		
2018	Vespiary	Saber	Borzou Niknejad		
2018	Texas	Bahram Kashkouli	Masoud Atyabi		
2018	The Misunderstanding		Ahmad Reza Motamedi	Nominated – Crystal Simorgh Fajr Film Festival Award for Best Supporting Actor	
2019	We Are All Together	Ali Hajati	Kamal Tabrizi		
2019	Labyrinth	Nariman	Amir Hossein Torabi		
2019	Texas 2	Bahram Kashkouli	Masoud Atyabi		
2019	Main Idea	Nima	Azita Moguie		
2019	Dance with Me	Reza	Soroush Sehhat		
2019	Doubt	Amir	Ali Tasdighi	Short Film	
2020	Amphibious	Mojtaba	Borzou Niknejad		
2020	The Good, the Bad & the Corny 2: Secret Army	Pejman Jamshidi	Peyman Ghasemkhani		
2020	180° Rule	Hamed	Farnoosh Samadi		
2021	Be Human Once a Week	Ali Ahmadi	Sharam Shah Hosseini		
2021	Shishlik	Ahmad	Mohammad Hossein Mahdavian	Nominated – Crystal Simorgh Fajr Film Festival Award for Best Supporting Actor	
2021	Dynamite	Hadi	Masoud Atyabi		
2022	Grassland	Amir Hossein	Kazem Daneshi	Nominated – Crystal Simorgh Fajr Film Festival Award for Best Actor	
2022	Motherless	Mahmoud	Morteza Fatemi		
2022	Bucharest	Jalil	Masoud Atyabi		
2023	A Relic of the South	Saleh	Hossein Amiri Doomari, Pedram Pouramiri		
2023	Lawless City	Parviz	Karim Amini		
2023	Hotel	Ramin Ghaderi	Masoud Atyabi		
2023	Beach Villa	Younes	Kianoush Ayari		
2024	Breakfast with Giraffes	Reza	Soroush Sehhat		
2024	Alligator Blood	Pejman	Javad Ezzati	Cameo	
2024	Bodiless	Mehrdad Behmanesh	Morteza Alizadeh		
2025	Antique	Ebi	Hadi Naiji		
2025	Molotov Cocktail	Mahjoub	Hossein Amiri Domari		
2025	Dinosaur	Reza	Masoud Atyabi		
2025	The House of Ghosts		Kiarash Asadizadeh	Completed in 2020	
TBA	Shark		Ali Atshani	Post-production	
TBA	Breathe Eater		Mohammad Kart	Pre-production	

=== Web ===
Year	Title	Role	Director	Platform	Ref(s)
2019	Classico	Himself	Adel Ferdosipour	Cafe Bazaar, Filimo, Namave	
2021	The Good, the Bad & the Corny: Radioactive	Pejman Jamshidi	Mohsen Chegini	Filimo	
2021	Predictor	Himself	Reza Baharvan & Amin Entezari	Namava	
2022	Party	Himself	Iraj Tahmasb	Namava	
2022	Chameleon	Jamal Porsche	Borzou Niknejad	Filmnet	
2022	Antenna	Khalil Rahmani	Ebrahim Amerian	Namava	
2023	You Only Go Around Once	Himself	Soroush Sehhat	Filimo, Namava	
2024	Viper of Tehran	Himself	Saman Moghaddam	Filmnet	

=== Television ===
Year	Title	Role	Director	Notes	Network	Ref(s)
2011	Doctors' Building	Himself	Soroush Sehhat	TV series	IRIB TV3	
2012–2013	Pejman	Himself	Soroush Sehhat	TV series	IRIB TV3	
2014	The Cloudy Years	Mehran	Mehdi Karampour	TV series	IRIB TV2	
2017	Breathe	Abbas	Jalil Saman	TV series	IRIB TV3	
2017–2018	Divar Be Divar	Bahram Rezaei	Saman Moghaddam	TV series	IRIB TV3	
2020–2024	Hoard	Fariborz Bagh Bisheh	Jalil Saman	TV series	IRIB TV1	

== Awards and nominations ==
Award	Year	Category	Nominated Work	Result
Antalya Golden Orange Film Festival	2022	Best International Actor	Grassland	Won
Beirut International Women Film Festival	2021	Best International Ensemble Cast	180° Rule	Won
Fajr Film Festival	2018	Best Actor in a Supporting Role	The Misunderstanding	Nominated
Fajr Film Festival	2021	Best Actor in a Supporting Role	Shishlik	Nominated
Fajr Film Festival	2022	Best Actor in a Leading Role	Grassland	Nominated
Fajr Film Festival	2023	Best Actor in a Supporting Role	A Relic of the South	Honorary Diploma
Hafez Awards	2014	Best Actor – Television Series Comedy	Pejman	Nominated
Hafez Awards	2017	Best Actor – Motion Picture	The Good, the Bad, the Corny	Nominated
Hafez Awards	2018	Best Actor – Television Series Comedy	Divar Be Divar	Nominated
Hafez Awards	2021	Best Actor – Television Series Comedy	Zir Khaki	Won
Hafez Awards	2023	Best Actor – Television Series Comedy	Chameleon	Nominated
Hafez Awards	2023	Best Actor – Motion Picture	Grassland	Won
Urban International Film Festival	2022	Best Actor	Zir Khaki	Won
