= Jamshid Hashempour =

Iranian actor (born 1944)

- جمشید هاشم‌پور
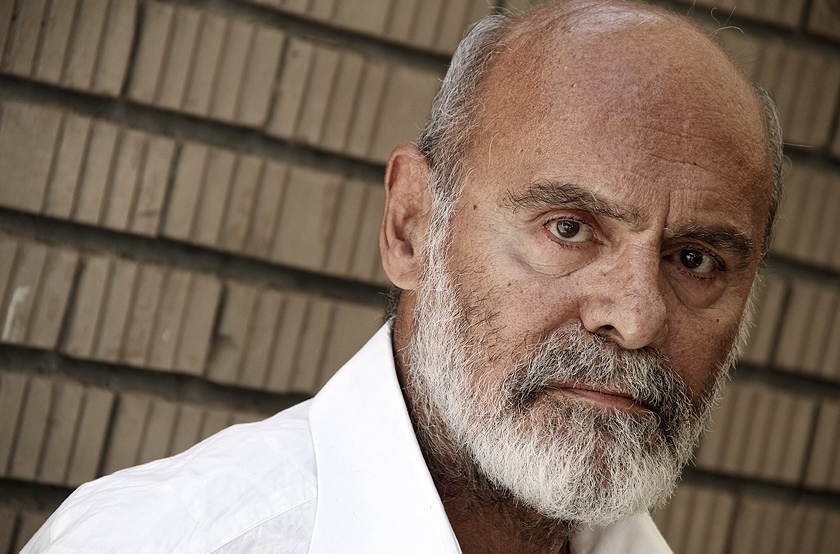
- Born: Jamshid Arya; 23 March 1944 (age 81); Tehran, Iran
- Occupation: film actor
- Years active: 1967–2023
- Spouse: Mehrangiz Matin
- Children: 2

Jamshid Hashempour (Persian: جمشید هاشم‌پور; born March 23, 1944), birth name Jamshid Arya (جمشید آریا), is an Iranian actor. Jamshid Hashempour has starred in action and thriller movies. He has performed in more than 80 films.

== Filmography ==
- Dadshah (1983)
- Eagles (1984)
- Extortion (1985)
- Cheetah (1985)
- The Blade and the Silk (1987)
- The Grand Day (1989)
- Mother (1991)
- The Last Act (1991)
- The Secret of the Red Flower (1992)
- Love Stricken (1992)
- The Viper (1992)
- Flowers and Bullets (1992)
- Yaran (1993)
- Flight from the camp (1993)
- Toofan's Strike (1994)
- Punishment (1995)
- Scorpion (1996)
- Heeva (1998)
- Yaghi (1998)
- The Red Ribbon (1998)
- Eagle Eye (1998)
- Swan Song (2000)
- Ray's passenger (2001)
- Travel To Tomorrow (2001)
- The Poisonous Mushroom (2002)
- The Fifth Reaction (2003)
- Mazrae-ye Pedari (2003)
- A Little Kiss (2005)
- Online Murder (2005)
- M Like Mother (2006)
- Four Finger (2007)
- A Petition for Allah (2008)
- Kolbeh (2009)
- Face to Face (2009)
- Keyfar (2010)
- Guidance Patrol (2012)
- Hush! Girls Don't Scream (2013)
- I’m Diego Maradona (2014)
- Shahrzad (2015)
- Mission Impossible (2018)
- Aghazadeh (TV series) (2020)
- Shishlik (2021)
