= Crystal Simorgh for Best Director =

Category of film award

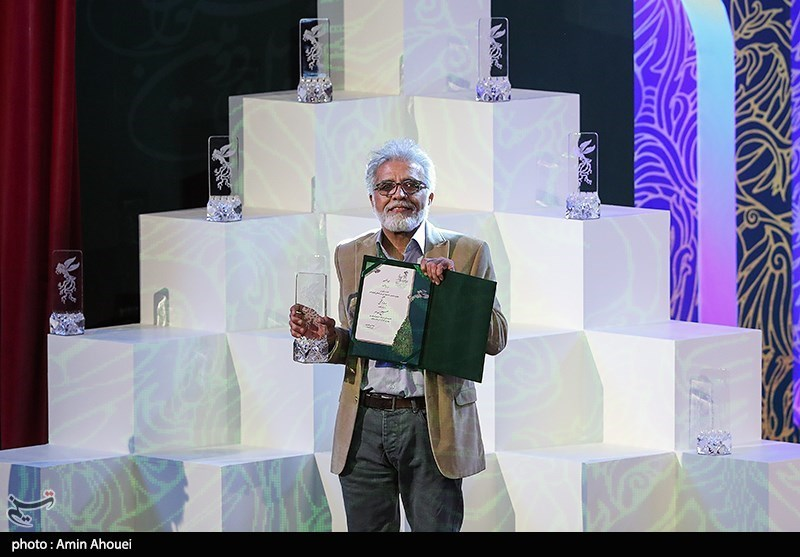
- Current recipient (2024): Behrouz Afkhami
- Country: Iran
- Presented by: Fajr International Film Festival
- First award: 1984
- Currently held by: Behrouz Afkhami for: The Morning of The Execution (2024)

Highlights
- Most wins: Majid Majidi (4 times)
- Most nominations: Dariush Mehrjui (12 times)
- Website: fajrfilmfestival.com

Crystal Simorgh for Best Director is an award presented annually by the Fajr International Film Festival held in Iran. It is given in honor of a film director who has exhibited outstanding directing.

== Winners and nominees ==
Table key
Winner
Winner of the Honorary Diploma
‡ Winner of the Crystal Simorgh for Best Film

Year	Director	Film	Ref.(s)
1983 1	Not awarded		
1984 2	Khosrow Sinai (Note: Nominations for 1983–1986 are not available.) (Note: Crystal Simorgh statuette awarded from 7th FIFF on 1989.)	The Inner Beast	
1985 3	Yadollah Samadi	The Man Who Knew Too Much	
1986 4	Kianoush Ayari	The Monster	
1987 5	Abbas Kiarostami	Where Is the Friend's Home?	
1987 5	Nasser Taghvai	Captain Khorshid	
1987 5	Dariush Mehrjui	The Lodgers	
1987 5	Ebrahim Forouzesh	The Key	
1987 5	Masoud Jafari Jozani	The Stony Lion	
1988 6	Kianoush Ayari	Beyond the Fire	
1988 6	Pouran Derakhshandeh	Little Bird of Happiness	
1988 6	Siamak Shayeghi	A Dowry for Robab	
1988 6	Manouchehr Asgarinasab	The Awaiting Home	
1988 6	Dariush Mehrjui	Shirak	
1989 7	Mohsen Makhmalbaf	The Cyclist	
1989 7	Mohsen Makhmalbaf	The Marriage of the Blessed	
1989 7	Masoud Jafari Jozani	Eye of the Hurricane ‡	
1989 7	Manouchehr Asgarinasab	Hey Joe	
1990 8	Dariush Mehrjui	Hamoun	
1990 8	Ebrahim Hatamikia	The Immigrant ‡	
1990 8	Abbas Kiarostami	Close-Up	
1990 8	Yadollah Samadi	Savalan	
1990 8	Mohammad Motevaselani	The Seeker	
1991 9	Varuzh Karim-Masihi	The Last Act	
1991 9	Behrouz Afkhami	The Bride	
1991 9	Yadollah Samadi	Apartment No.13 ‡	
1991 9	Dariush Farhang	One Ticket, Two Movies!	
1992 10	Rakhshan Bani-Etemad	Nargess	
1992 10	Bahram Beyzai	Travellers	
1992 10	Mohsen Makhmalbaf	Once Upon a Time, Cinema	
1992 10	Alireza Davoodnejad	The Need ‡	
1992 10	Mehdi Sabbaghzadeh	The Quiet Home	
1993 11	Sirus Alvand	Once for Ever	
1993 11	Ebrahim Hatamikia	From Karkheh to Rhein ‡	
1993 11	Dariush Mehrjui	Sara	
1993 11	Mohsen Makhmalbaf	Actor	
1994 12	Mohammad Bozorgnia	Tanker War	
1994 12	Ebrahim Hatamikia	The Green Ashes	
1994 12	Hassan Hedayat	The Devil's Eye	
1994 12	Jamal Shurjeh	The Epic of Majnun	
1994 12	Hossein-Ali Layalestani	Zero Heights	
1995 13	Dariush Mehrjui	Pari	
1995 13	Shahram Assadi	The Fateful Day ‡	
1995 13	Ahmad-Reza Darvish	Kimia	
1995 13	Rakhshan Bani-Etemad	The Blue-Veiled	
1996 14	Kiumars Pourahmad	Strange Sisters	
1996 14	Majid Majidi	The Father ‡	
1996 14	Rasoul Mollagholipour	Journey to Chazabeh	
1996 14	Mohsen Makhmalbaf	Gabbeh	
1997 15	Majid Majidi	Children of Heaven ‡	
1997 15	Ahmad-Reza Darvish	Land of the Sun	
1997 15	Dariush Mehrjui	Leila	
1997 15	Parviz Shahbazi	The Traveller from the South	
1998 16	Ebrahim Hatamikia	The Glass Agency ‡	
1998 16	Farhad Mehranfar	The Tree of Life	
1998 16	Dariush Mehrjui	The Pear Tree	
1998 16	Rakhshan Bani-Etemad	The May Lady	
1998 16	Mojtaba Ra'i	Birth of A Butterfly	
1999 17	Rasoul Mollagholipour	Heeva ‡	
1999 17	Ebrahim Hatamikia	The Red Ribbon	
1999 17	Tahmineh Milani	Two Women	
1999 17	Majid Majidi	The Color of Paradise	
1999 17	Alireza Davoodnejad	Sweet Agony	
2000 18	Bahman Farmanara	Smell of Camphor, Scent of Jasmine ‡	
2000 18	Masoud Kimiai	Protest	
2000 18	Dariush Mehrjui	The Mix	
2000 18	Masoud Jafari Jozani	Maturity	
2000 18	Reza Mirkarimi	The Child and the Soldier	
2001 19	Majid Majidi	Baran ‡	
2001 19	Homayoun Ass'adian	End of the Game	
2001 19	Bahram Beyzai	Killing Mad Dogs	
2001 19	Alireza Davoodnejad	Paradise for you	
2001 19	Reza Mirkarimi	Under the Moonlight	
2002 20	Rasul Sadr Ameli	I'm Taraneh, 15	
2002 20	Nasser Taghvai	Unruled Paper	
2002 20	Ebrahim Hatamikia	Low Heights	
2002 20	Dariush Mehrjui	To Stay Alive	
2002 20	Alireza Raisian	The Deserted Station	
2002 20	Nasser Refaei	The Exam	
2003 21	Reza Mirkarimi	Here, A Shining Light	
2003 21	Kamal Tabrizi	Look at the Sky Sometimes	
2003 21	Parviz Shahbazi	Deep Breath	
2003 21	Asghar Farhadi	Dancing in the Dust	
2003 21	Ahmad-Reza Mo'tamedi	The Insane Flew Away ‡	
2004 22	Ahmad-Reza Darvish	Duel	
2004 22	Dariush Mehrjui	Mum's Guest ‡	
2004 22	Asghar Farhadi	The Beautiful City	
2004 22	Sirus Alvand	The Winning Card	
2004 22	Mohammad-Mehdi Asgarpour	Ghadamgah	
2005 23	Majid Majidi	The Willow Tree	
2005 23	Mohammad Bozorgnia	A Place to Live	
2005 23	Reza Mirkarimi	So Close, So Far ‡	
2005 23	Kambuzia Partovi	Café Transit	
2005 23	Parviz Sheikhtadi	Behind the Curtain of Fog	
2005 23	Bijan Mirbagheri	We Are All Fine	
2006 24	Asghar Farhadi	Fireworks Wednesday	
2006 24	Ebrahim Hatamikia	In the Name of the Father ‡	
2006 24	Abolhassan Davoudi	The Incident	
2006 24	Khosrow Ma'sumi	Somewhere Far Away	
2006 24	Mona Zandi Haghighi	Friday Evening	
2007 25	Mohammad-Hossein Latifi	The Third Day ‡	
2007 25	Amir-Shahab Razavian	Colors of Memory	
2007 25	Kiumars Pourahmad	The Night Bus	
2007 25	Mohammad-Mehdi Asgarpour	Eghlima	
2007 25	Bahram Tavakoli	Barefoot in Paradise	
2008 26	Majid Majidi	The Song of Sparrows	
2008 26	Khosrow Ma'sumi	Wind Blows in the Meadow	
2008 26	Reza Mirkarimi	As Simple as That ‡	
2008 26	Mohammad-Ali Talebi	The Wall	
2009 27	Asghar Farhadi	About Elly	
2009 27	Abdolreza Kahani	Twenty	
2009 27	Hassan Fathi	The Postman Doesn't Knock 3 Times	
2009 27	Varuzh Karim-Masihi	Doubt ‡	
2009 27	Tahmineh Milani	Superstar	
2009 27	Bahram Beyzai	When We're All Asleep	
2010 28	Ebrahim Hatamikia	In Amethyst Color ‡	
2010 28	Alireza Amini	Seven Minutes to Fall	
2010 28	Alireza Raisian	Forty Years Old	
2010 28	Homayoun Ass'adian	Gold and Copper	
2010 28	Shahriar Bahrani	The Kingdom of Solomon	
2010 28	Shahram Assadi	The Fateful Night	
2011 29	Asghar Farhadi	A Separation	
2011 29	Masoud Kimiai	Crime ‡	
2011 29	Dariush Mehrjui	Beloved Sky	
2011 29	Ahmad-Reza Mo'tamedi	Alzheimer	
2011 29	Mohammad Bozorgnia	The Maritime Silk Road	
2012 30	Parviz Sheikhtadi	Days of Life	
2012 30	Dariush Mehrjui	Orange Suit	
2012 30	Mohammad-Ali Bashe-Ahangar	The Queen	
2012 30	Homayoun Ass'adian	Kissing the Moon-Like Face	
2012 30	Mani Haghighi	Modest Reception	
2013 31	Parviz Shahbazi	Trapped	
2013 31	Alireza Davoodnejad	Actors Studio	
2013 31	Behnam Behzadi	Bending the Rules	
2013 31	Behrouz Shoeibi	The Corridor	
2013 31	Ali Ghafari	Give Back ‡	
2014 32	Ahmad-Reza Darvish	Hussein Who Said No ‡	
2014 32	Hamid Nematollah	Hard Makeup	
2014 32	Behrouz Afkhami	Azar, Shahdokht, Parviz and Others ‡	
2014 32	Ebrahim Hatamikia	Che	
2014 32	Mohammad-Mehdi Asgarpour	We Have A Guest	
2015 33	Abolhassan Davoudi	Crazy Rook ‡	
2015 33	Bahram Tavakoli	I Am Diego Maradona	
2015 33	Farzad Motamen	The Long Farewell	
2015 33	Alireza Raisian	Time to Love	
2015 33	Mostafa Kiayee	Ice Age	
2015 33	Abdolhassan Barzideh	Mazar Sharif	
2016 34	Saeed Roustayi	Life and a Day	
2016 34	Mohammad-Hossein Mahdavian	Standing in the Dust ‡	
2016 34	Reza Mirkarimi	Daughter	
2016 34	Kamal Tabrizi	Mina's Choice	
2016 34	Farzad Motamen	When Did You See Sahar Last Time?	
2017 35	Vahid Jalilvand	No Date, No Signature	
2017 35	Alireza Davoodnejad	Ferrari	
2017 35	Ebrahim Irajzad	Searing Summer	
2017 35	Pouran Derakhshandeh	Under the Smokey Roof	
2017 35	Mohammad-Hossein Mahdavian	Midday Adventures ‡	
2017 35	Rambod Javan	Negar	
2018 36	Bahram Tavakoli	The Lost Strait ‡	
2018 36	Ebrahim Hatamikia	Damascus Time	
2018 36	Behrouz Shoeibi	Axing	
2018 36	Mohammad-Ali Bashe-Ahangar	Under Water Cypress	
2018 36	Kambuzia Partovi	Truck	
2018 36	Houman Seyyedi	Sheeple	
2019 37	Narges Abyar	When the Moon Was Full ‡	
2019 37	Nima Javidi	The Warden	
2019 37	Bahram Tavakoli	Gholamreza Takhti	
2019 37	Saeed Roustayi	Just 6.5	
2019 37	Reza Mirkarimi	Castle of Dreams	
2019 37	Mohammad-Hossein Mahdavian	Midday Adventures: Trace of Blood	
2020 38	Mohammad-Hossein Mahdavian	Walnut Tree	
2020 38	Saeid Malekan	Day Zero	
2020 38	Niki Karimi	Atabai	
2020 38	Morteza Farshbaf	Tooman	
2020 38	Majid Majidi	The Sun ‡	
2020 38	Mohammad Kart	Butterfly Stroke	
2021 39	Mehdi Jafari	Yadoo ‡	
2021 39	Narges Abyar	Piebald	
2021 39	Arsalan Amiri	Zalava	
2021 39	Mohsen Gharaie	Without Everything	
2022 40	Reza Mirkarimi	The Night Guardian	
2022 40	Hadi Hejazifar	The Situation of Mehdi	
2022 40	Amir Hossein Asgari	The Last Snow	
2022 40	Kazem Daneshi	Grassland	
2022 40	Behrouz Shoeibi	No Prior Appointment	
2023 41	Mohammad Ali Bashe Ahangar	Metropol Cinema	
2023 41	Hossein Mirzamohammadi	The Leather Jacket Man	
2023 41	Mohammad Asgari	Mud Room	
2023 41	Hadi Mohammadian; Behnoud Nekouie; Mohammad-Javad Jannati	Smart Kid	
2023 41	Babak Khajeh Pasha	In the Arms of the Tree	
2023 41	Hamid Zargarnejad	Number Ten	
2023 41	Mohammad-Hossien Latifi	The Stranger	
2024 42	Behrouz Afkhami	The Morning of The Execution	
2024 42	Ali Saghafi	Parviz Khan	
2024 42	Masoud Jafari Jozani	Paradise of Criminals	
2024 42	Mehdi Shamohammadi	Majnoon	
2024 42	Javad Ezzati	Aligator Blood	
2024 42	Mahmoud Kalari	Summer Time	

== Most wins and nominations ==
Most nominations
Nominations	Director
12	Dariush Mehrjui
10	Ebrahim Hatamikia
8	Reza Mirkarimi
7	Majid Majidi
5	Mohsen Makhmalbaf
5	Asghar Farhadi
5	Alireza Davoodnejad
4	Ahmad-Reza Darvish
4	Bahram Tavakoli
4	Mohammad-Hossein Mahdavian
4	Masoud Jafari Jozani
3	Yadollah Samadi
3	Rakhshan Bani-Etemad
3	Bahram Beyzai
3	Mohammad Bozorgnia
3	Homayoun Ass'adian
3	Parviz Shahbazi
3	Mohammad-Mehdi Asgarpour
3	Alireza Raisian
3	Behrouz Shoeibi
3	Behrouz Afkhami

Most wins
Wins	Director
4	Majid Majidi
3	Ebrahim Hatamikia
3	Asghar Farhadi
2	Dariush Mehrjui
2	Reza Mirkarimi
2	Ahmad Reza Darvish
2	Kianoush Ayari
