= Crystal Simorgh for Best Film =

Category of film award

- Country: Iran
- Presented by: Fajr International Film Festival
- First award: 1985
- Currently held by: Abbas Naderan for Majnoon (2024)

Highlights
- Most wins: Farabi Cinema Foundation (3 times)
- Most nominations: Farabi Cinema Foundation (9 times)
- Website: fajrfilmfestival.com

Crystal Simorgh for Best Film is an award presented annually by the Fajr International Film Festival held in Iran.

== Winners and nominees ==
Table key
Winner
Winner of the Honorary Diploma

Year	Film	Producer(s)	Ref.(s)
1983 1	Not awarded		
1984 2	No winner (Note: Nominations for 1983–1986 are not available.)		
1985 3	The Scarecrow (Note: Crystal Simorgh statuette awarded from 7th FIFF on 1989.)	Mostazafan Foundation's West Azerbaijan Province branch	
1986 4	No absolute winner		
1986 4	Frosty Roads	Farabi Cinema Foundation	
1986 4	The Grandfather	Peikar Company	
1986 4	The Finish Line	Eifa Cinema Organization	
1986 4	The Bus	Ayat Film	
1987 5	The Flight in the Night	Rasoul Mollagholipour	
1987 5	Where Is the Friend's Home?	Alireza Zarrin	
1987 5	Captain Khorshid	Haroun Yashayaei and Mohammad-Ali Soltan-Zadeh	
1987 5	The Lodgers	Haroun Yashayaei and Mohammad-Ali Soltan-Zadeh	
1987 5	The Stony Lion	Masoud Jafari Jozani and Alireza Shoja Nouri	
1988 6	No winner		
1989 7	Eye of the Hurricane	Haroun Yashayaei	
1989 7	The Scout	Farabi Cinema Foundation	
1989 7	Grand Cinema	Aliakbar Erfani and Hassan Hedayat	
1989 7	Pomegranate and Cane	Saeed Ebrahimifar and Hossein Irie	
1989 7	The Cyclist	Mostazafan Foundation's Cinematic Affairs Institute	
1990 8	The Immigrant	AIIPO	
1990 8	Hamoun	Dariush Mehrjui and Haroun Yashayaei	
1990 8	Close-Up	Alireza Zarrin	
1990 8	Savalan	Seif-Ali Seyed-Kosarinejad	
1990 8	The Seeker	Ahmad Zahabzadeh, Abolfazl Entezari, Ali Sepaseh and Sha'ban-Ali Eslami	
1991 9	Apartment No.13	Yadollah Samadi and Hamrah Filmmaking Group	
1991 9	One Ticket, Two Movies!	Gholamreza Moayeri and CSCIFI	
1992 10	The Need	Alireza Davoodnejad and Ali Vajed-Samii	
1992 10	Travellers	Bahram Beyzai, Khosrow Khosravi, Majid Roudiani and Abbas Sheikhzadeh	
1992 10	Nargess	Rakhshan Bani-Etemad and Arman Film	
1992 10	Once Upon a Time, Cinema	Masoud Jafari Jozani and Mohammad-Mehdi Dadgoo	
1993 11	From Karkheh to Rhein	Sina Film	
1993 11	Once for Ever	Majid Modarresi	
1993 11	Sara	Dariush Mehrjui and Hashem Seifi	
1993 11	Shame	IRIB TV1	
1993 11	Shadows of Assault	IRIB TV2 and CYALAH	
1994 12	No winner		
1995 13	The Fateful Day	Farabi Cinema Foundation	
1995 13	Kimia	Pakhshiran	
1995 13	Pari	Dariush Mehrjui, Amir-Hossein Sharifi and Hashem Seifi	
1995 13	The Disarmament	Alireza Davoodnejad, Mahvash Jazayeri and Farabi Cinema Foundation	
1995 13	The Blue-Veiled	Majid Modarresi and Fariborz Pourmand	
1996 14	The Father	Documentary and Experimental Film Center	
1996 14	Strange Sisters	Kiumars Pourahmad and Soureh Cinema Development Organization	
1996 14	The Red Circle	Mostazafan Foundation's Cinematic Affairs Institute	
1996 14	Gabbeh	Khalil Doroudchi and Khalil Mahmoudi	
1996 14	The Survivor	Manouchehr Mohammadi, Manouchehr Asgarinasab and Seifollah Dad	
1997 15	Children of Heaven	IIDCYA	
1997 15	Land of the Sun	Farabi Cinema Foundation	
1997 15	Leila	Dariush Mehrjui, Faramarz Farazmand	
1997 15	The Traveller from the South	Kourosh Mazkouri and IRIB TV2	
1998 16	The Glass Agency	Varahonar and Farabi Cinema Foundation	
1998 16	The Tree of Life	Mohammadreza Sarhangi and IRIB TV2	
1998 16	The Pear Tree	Dariush Mehrjui, Faramarz Farazmand and Farabi Cinema Foundation	
1998 16	The May Lady	Alireza Raisian and Jahangir Kosari	
1998 16	Birth of A Butterfly	SimaFilm	
1999 17	Heeva	Negin Film and Soureh Cinema Development Organization	
1999 17	The Color of Paradise	Varahonar	
1999 17	Two Women	Arman Film and Arta Film	
1999 17	Son of Maryam	Fereshteh Taerpoor	
1999 17	Red	Gholamreza Mousavi and Habib Esmaeili	
1999 17	Sweet Agony	Alireza Davoodnejad and Ali Vajed-Samii	
2000 18	Smell of Camphor, Scent of Jasmine	Morteza Shayesteh	
2000 18	Protest	Masoud Kimiai	
2000 18	Rain Man	Abolhassan Davoudi	
2000 18	Born Under Libra	Tamasha Cultural Institute and Soureh Cinema Development Organization	
2000 18	Maturity	Masoud Jafari Jozani, Fathollah Jafari Jozani and Abbas Haghighi	
2001 19	Baran	Majid Majidi and Fouad Nahas	
2001 19	Under the Moonlight	Manouchehr Mohammadi	
2001 19	Killing Mad Dogs	Bahram Beyzai	
2001 19	Paradise for you	Ali Vajed-Samii	
2001 19	End of the Game	Namaadin	
2002 20	A House Built on Water	Bahman Farmanara	
2002 20	I'm Taraneh, 15	Rasul Sadr Ameli	
2002 20	Low Heights	Manouchehr Mohammadi	
2002 20	To Stay Alive	Dariush Mehrjui, Tahmineh Milani and Mohammad Nikbin	
2002 20	Unruled Paper	Hassan Tavakkolnia	
2002 20	The Poisonous Mushroom	Rasoul Mollagholipour	
2003 21	The Insane Flew Away	Mohammad-Reza Takht-Keshian	
2003 21	The Wind Carpet	Alireza Shoja Nouri	
2003 21	Here, A Shining Light	Reza Mirkarimi	
2003 21	Deep Breath	Amir Samavati	
2003 21	The Fifth Reaction	Mohammad Nikbin	
2004 22	Mum's Guest	Dariush Mehrjui and SimaFilm	
2004 22	Duel	Tamasha Cultural Institute	
2004 22	Tradition of Lover Killing	Mahmoud Fallah	
2004 22	The Beautiful City	Iraj Taghipour and Neshaneh Film Production	
2004 22	Ghadamgah	Mohammad-Reza Takht-Keshian, IRIB TV1 and Farabi Cinema Foundation	
2005 23	So Close, So Far	Reza Mirkarimi	
2005 23	The Willow Tree	Majid Majidi	
2005 23	Behind the Curtain of Fog	Mohammad Khazaee	
2005 23	A Place to Live	Hassan Beshkufeh	
2005 23	Café Transit	Amir Samavati	
2005 23	We Are All Fine	Mohammad-Reza Takht-Keshian	
2006 24	In the Name of the Father	Ebrahim Hatamikia	
2006 24	The Incident	Nasser Shafagh and Saeed Hajimiri	
2006 24	Fireworks Wednesday	Jamal Sadatian	
2006 24	Friday Evening	Jahangir Kosari	
2007 25	The Third Day	Alireza Jalali	
2007 25	Colors of Memory	Amir-Shahab Razavian	
2007 25	The Night Bus	Mehdi Homayounfar	
2008 26	As Simple as That	Reza Mirkarimi	
2008 26	The Song of Sparrows	Majid Majidi	
2008 26	Wind Blows in the Meadow	Fathollah Jafari Jozani	
2009 27	Doubt	Saeed Sa'di	
2009 27	Twenty	Pouran Derakhshandeh	
2009 27	The Postman Doesn't Knock 3 Times	Javad Norouzbeigi	
2009 27	About Elly	Asghar Farhadi	
2009 27	Motherland	Abolhassan Davoudi	
2009 27	When We're All Asleep	Bahram Beyzai	
2010 28	In Amethyst Color	Jamal Sadatian	
2010 28	Forty Years Old	Alireza Raisian	
2010 28	The Fateful Night	Seyyed Ahmad Mir-Alaei	
2010 28	Gold and Copper	Manouchehr Mohammadi	
2010 28	The Kingdom of Solomon	Mojtaba Faravardeh	
2010 28	Seven Minutes to Fall	Jamal Sadatian	
2011 29	Crime	Masoud Kimiai	
2011 29	Beloved Sky	SimaFilm	
2011 29	A Separation	Asghar Farhadi	
2011 29	Alzheimer	Saeed Sa'di	
2011 29	33 Days	Mehdi Homayounfar	
2012 30	No winner		
2012 30	Days of Life	Saeed Sa'di	
2012 30	Bulletproof	Reza Rakhshan	
2012 30	The Queen	Abolghasem Hosseini	
2012 30	Orange Suit	Dariush Mehrjui	
2012 30	The Wooden Bridge	Ali Sartipi and Mehdi Davari	
2012 30	Kissing the Moon-Like Face	Manouchehr Mohammadi	
2013 31	Give Back	Mohsen Ali-Akbari	
2013 31	Trapped	Amir Samavati	
2013 31	The Corridor	Mahmoud Razavi	
2013 31	Sinners	Faramarz Gharibian	
2013 31	Berlin -7°	Siamak Poursharif	
2014 32	Hussein Who Said No	Taghi Aligholizadeh	
2014 32	Azar, Shahdokht, Parviz and Others	Behrouz Afkhami and Jamal Sadatian	
2014 32	Che	Farabi Cinema Foundation	
2014 32	Track 143	Mohammad-Hossein Ghasemi and Abouzar Pourmohammadi	
2014 32	Tales	Rakhshan Bani-Etemad	
2015 33	Crazy Rook	Bita Mansouri	
2015 33	The Long Farewell	Farzad Motamen and Ali Hazrati	
2015 33	Time to Love	Alireza Raisian	
2015 33	Mazar Sharif	Manouchehr Shahsavari	
2015 33	I Am Diego Maradona	Javad Norouzbeigi	
2016 34	Standing in the Dust	Habibollah Valinejad	
2016 34	Life and A Day	Saeid Malekan	
2016 34	Mina's Choice	Kamal Tabrizi	
2016 34	Daughter	Reza Mirkarimi	
2016 34	When Did You See Sahar Last Time?	Farzad Motamen	
2017 35	Midday Adventures	Mahmoud Razavi	
2017 35	No Date, No Signature	Ali Jalilvand	
2017 35	Searing Summer	Javad Norouzbeigi	
2017 35	Ferrari	Jahangir Kosari	
2017 35	Under the Smokey Roof	Pouran Derakhshandeh	
2018 36	The Lost Strait	Saeid Malekan	
2018 36	Damascus Time	Mohammad Khazaee	
2018 36	Bomb: A Love Story	Payman Maadi and Ehsan Rasoulof	
2018 36	Axing	Mahmoud Razavi	
2018 36	Under Water Cypress	Hamed Hosseini	
2018 36	Truck	Kambuzia Partovi	
2018 36	Sheeple	Saeed Sa'di	
2019 37	When the Moon Was Full	Mohammad-Hossein Ghasemi	
2019 37	Midday Adventures: Trace of Blood	Mahmoud Razavi	
2019 37	The Warden	Majid Motalebi	
2019 37	Gholamreza Takhti	Saeid Malekan	
2019 37	Just 6.5	Jamal Sadatian	
2019 37	Castle of Dreams	Reza Mirkarimi	
2020 38	The Sun	Majid Majidi and Amir Banan	
2020 38	Butterfly Stroke	Rasul Sadr Ameli	
2020 38	Walnut Tree	Mostafa Ahmadi	
2020 38	Day Zero	Saeid Malekan	
2020 38	Atabai	Niki Karimi	
2021 39	Yadoo	Mohammad Reza Mesbah	
2021 39	Pinto	Mohammadhossein Ghasemi	
2021 39	Without Everything	Javad Norouzbeigi	
2021 39	Zalava	Roohollah Baradari and Samira Baradari	
2022 40	The Situation of Mehdi	Habibollah Valinejad	
2022 40	Grassland	Bahram Radan	
2022 40	The Last Snow	Hassan Mostafavi	
2022 40	The Night Guardian	Reza Mirkarimi	
2023 41	Metropol Cinema	Hamed Hosseini	
2023 41	Smart Kid	Hamed Jafari	
2023 41	Number Ten	Ebrahim Asghari	
2023 41	In the Arms of the Tree	Mohammadreza Mesbah	
2023 41	Mud Room	Davoud Sabouri	
2023 41	The Leather Jacket Man	Kamran Hejazi	
2023 41	My Name is Love	Mojtaba Rashvand	
2024 42	Majnoon	Abbas Naderan	
2024 42	Summer Time	Ali Oji	
2024 42	Parviz Khan	Ata Panahi	
2024 42	The Morning of The Execution	Ali Shirmohammadi	
2024 42	The West Sky	Habibollah Valinejad	

== Most wins and nominations ==
Most nominations
Nominations	Producer
8	Dariush Mehrjui
5	Manouchehr Mohammadi
5	Jamal Sadatian
5	Reza Mirkarimi
4	Haroun Yashayaei
4	Saeed Sa'di
4	Mahmoud Razavi
4	Saeid Malekan
4	Majid Majidi
3	Alireza Davoodnejad
3	Masoud Jafari Jozani
3	Ali Vajed-Samii
3	Mohammad-Reza Takht-Keshian
3	Bahram Beyzai
3	Amir Samavati
3	Alireza Raisian
3	Jahangir Kosari
3	Javad Norouzbeigi
3	Habibollah Valinejad

Most wins
Wins	Producer
2	Reza Mirkarimi
2	Jamal Sadatian
2	Majid Majidi
2	Habibollah Valinejad

== Production companies ==
Production company	Nominations	Wins
Farabi Cinema Foundation	9	3
IRIB	5	0
Soureh Cinema Development Organization	3	1
SimaFilm	3	1
Varahonar	2	1
Arman Film	2	0
Tamasha Cultural Institute	2	0
Peikar Company	1	1
Eifa Cinema Organization	1	1
Ayat Film	1	1
AIIPO	1	1
Hamrah Filmmaking Group	1	1
Sina Film	1	1
Documentary and Experimental Film Center	1	1
IIDCYA	1	1
Negin Film	1	1
Pakhshiran	1	0
Arta Film	1	0
Namaadin	1	0
Neshaneh Film Production	1	0
