= Crystal Simorgh for Best Screenplay =

Category of film award

- Awarded for: The Best Screenwriter(s)
- Country: Iran
- Presented by: Fajr International Film Festival
- First award: 1984
- Currently held by: No Winner (2024); Ali Saghafi (Honorary Diploma) for Parviz Khan (2024)

Highlights
- Most wins: Kambuzia Partovi (4 times)
- Most nominations: Dariush Mehrjui (9 times)
- Honorary Diploma: Ebrahim Hatamikia (2 times)
- Website: fajrfilmfestival.com

Crystal Simorgh for Best Screenplay is an award presented annually by the Fajr International Film Festival held in Iran.

== Winners and nominees ==
Table key
Winner
Winner of the Honorary Diploma

Year	Film	Screenwriter(s)	Ref.(s)
1983 1	Not awarded		
1984 2	Award (Note: Nominations for 1983–1986 are not available.) (Note: Crystal Simorgh statuette awarded from 7th FIFF on 1989.)	Alireza Davoodnejad and Ebrahim Makki	
1985 3	No Winner		
1986 4	The Grandfather	Majid Gharizadeh	
1987 5	The Stony Lion	Masoud Jafari Jozani	
1987 5	The Lodgers	Dariush Mehrjui	
1987 5	The Flight in the Night	Rasoul Mollagholipour	
1987 5	Where Is the Friend's Home?	Abbas Kiarostami	
1987 5	Manuscripts	Behrouz Afkhami	
1988 6	No Winner		
1989 7	The Cyclist	Mohsen Makhmalbaf	
1989 7	The Willow Branches	Amrollah Ahmadjoo	
1989 7	Eye of the Hurricane	Masoud Jafari Jozani	
1989 7	The Scout	Ebrahim Hatamikia	
1989 7	Grand Cinema	Hassan Hedayat	
1989 7	Pomegranate and Cane	Saeed Ebrahimifar, Hossein Irie and Aziz Tarseh	
1990 8	Hamoun	Dariush Mehrjui	
1990 8	The Immigrant	Ebrahim Hatamikia	
1990 8	The Seeker	Esmaeel Khalaj, Mihan Bahrami and Mohammad Motevaselani	
1990 8	Close-Up	Abbas Kiarostami	
1990 8	Savalan	Yadollah Samadi	
1991 9	Apartment No.13	Yadollah Samadi	
1991 9	The Last Act	Varuzh Karim-Masihi	
1991 9	The Nights of Zayandeh-Rood	Mohsen Makhmalbaf	
1991 9	The Bride	Behrouz Afkhami and Alireza Davoodnejad	
1991 9	Portrait of Love	Shahriar Parsipour and Hadi Seif	
1992 10	The Quiet Home	Asghar Abdollahi and Hassan Gholizadeh	
1992 10	Baduk	Majid Majidi and Seyyed Mahdi Shojaee	
1992 10	The Hustler	Mehdi Fakhimzadeh	
1992 10	Nargess	Rakhshan Bani-Etemad	
1992 10	The Need	Aliakbar Ghazinezam	
1993 11	Sara	Dariush Mehrjui	
1993 11	From Karkheh to Rhein	Ebrahim Hatamikia	
1993 11	Remember the Flight	Nasser Tahmasb	
1993 11	Shadows of Assault	Ahmad Amini	
1993 11	Once for Ever	Sirus Alvand	
1994 12	Tic Tac	Mohammad-Ali Talebi and Houshang Moradi Kermani	
1994 12	The Last Reconnaissance	Behzad Behzadpour	
1994 12	The Child Hero	Aliakbar Ghazinezam	
1994 12	Tanker War	Mohammad Bozorgnia	
1994 12	The Spouse	Mehdi Fakhimzadeh	
1995 13	The Blue-Veiled	Rakhshan Bani-Etemad	
1995 13	Kimia	Ahmad-Reza Darvish	
1995 13	The White Balloon	Abbas Kiarostami	
1995 13	Pari	Dariush Mehrjui	
1995 13	Path of Glory	Mahmoud Dehghan and Reza Ghahremani	
1995 13	The Fateful Day	Bahram Beyzai	
1996 14	Leily Is with Me	Kamal Tabrizi and Reza Maghsoudi	
1996 14	The Father	Majid Majidi and Seyyed Mahdi Shojaee	
1996 14	The Derrick	Abdolhassan Barzideh	
1996 14	The Survivor	Seifollah Dad	
1997 15	Children of Heaven	Majid Majidi	
1997 15	Leila	Dariush Mehrjui	
1997 15	The Traveller from the South	Parviz Shahbazi	
1997 15	Shadow to Shadow	Ali Zhekan	
1998 16	The Glass Agency	Ebrahim Hatamikia	
1998 16	Takhti: The World Champion	Behrouz Afkhami	
1998 16	Birth of A Butterfly	Saeid Shapouri	
1998 16	The Tree of Life	Farhad Mehranfar	
1999 17	Two Women	Tahmineh Milani	
1999 17	Son of Maryam	Hamid Jebeli	
1999 17	Sweet Agony	Alireza Davoodnejad	
1999 17	Heeva	Rasoul Mollagholipour	
1999 17	The Fair & the Ugly	Ahmad-Reza Mo'tamedi	
2000 18	The Bride of Fire	Khosrow Sinai and Hamid Farrokhnezhad	
2000 18	Smell of Camphor, Scent of Jasmine	Bahman Farmanara	
2000 18	Maturity	Masoud Jafari Jozani	
2000 18	The Child and the Soldier	Mohammad Rezaei-Rad	
2000 18	Whisper	Parviz Shahbazi	
2001 19	Killing Mad Dogs	Bahram Beyzai	
2001 19	Baran	Majid Majidi	
2002 20	I'm Taraneh, 15	Kambuzia Partovi and Rasul Sadr-Ameli	
2002 20	To Stay Alive	Dariush Mehrjui and Vahideh Mohammadifar	
2002 20	The White Dream	Hamid Jebeli	
2002 20	A House Built on Water	Bahman Farmanara	
2002 20	Unruled Paper	Nasser Taghvai and Minoo Farshchi	
2002 20	The Poisonous Mushroom	Rasoul Mollagholipour	
2003 21	Deep Breath	Parviz Shahbazi	
2003 21	Look at the Sky Sometimes	Farhad Tohidi	
2003 21	Pink	Fereydoun Jeyrani	
2003 21	Hard Times in Khomein	Mojtaba Ra'i	
2003 21	Here, A Shining Light	Reza Mirkarimi	
2004 22	The Lizard	Peyman GhasemKhani	
2004 22	Ghadamgah	Mohammad Rezaei-Rad	
2004 22	The Beautiful City	Asghar Farhadi	
2004 22	Him	Rahbar Ghanbari	
2004 22	Tradition of Lover Killing	Khosrow Ma'sumi	
2004 22	Mum's Guest	Dariush Mehrjui, Houshang Moradi Kermani and Vahideh Mohammadifar	
2005 23	Café Transit	Kambuzia Partovi	
2005 23	A Place to Live	Mohammad Bozorgnia	
2005 23	Behind the Curtain of Fog	Parviz Sheikhtadi and Hossein Yadegari	
2005 23	We Are All Fine	Mozhgan Farah Avar Moghaddam	
2005 23	The Willow Tree	Majid Majidi, Fouad Nahas and Nasser Hashemzadeh	
2005 23	So Close, So Far	Reza Mirkarimi and Mohammad-Reza Gohari	
2006 24	No Winner		
2006 24	In the Name of the Father	Ebrahim Hatamikia	
2006 24	Gradually…	Parviz Shahbazi	
2006 24	Fireworks Wednesday	Asghar Farhadi and Mani Haghighi	
2006 24	When All Were Asleep	Fereidoun Hassanpour	
2006 24	Friday Evening	Farid Mostafavi	
2007 25	Mainline	Rakhshan Bani-Etemad, Farid Mostafavi, Mohsen Abdolvahab and Naghmeh Samini	
2007 25	The Third Day	Mehdi Sajjadehchi	
2008 26	As Simple as That	Shadmehr Rastin and Reza Mirkarimi	
2008 26	A Petition for Allah	Alireza Amini and Mohsen Tanabandeh	
2008 26	Standing Alone	Gholamreza Ramezani	
2008 26	The Song of Sparrows	Majid Majidi and Mehran Kashani	
2008 26	Wind Blows in the Meadow	Khosrow Ma'sumi	
2009 27	Motherland	Abolhassan Davoudi and Farid Mostafavi	
2009 27	About Elly	Asghar Farhadi	
2009 27	Doubt	Varuzh Karim-Masihi	
2009 27	Superstar	Tahmineh Milani	
2009 27	Karat 14	Parviz Shahbazi	
2010 28	The Fateful Night	Homayoun Shahnavaz and Shahram Assadi	
2010 28	In Amethyst Color	Ebrahim Hatamikia	
2010 28	Forty Years Old	Mostafa Rastegari	
2010 28	Gold and Copper	Hamed Mohammadi	
2010 28	The Insider	Ahmad Kaveri	
2011 29	A Separation	Asghar Farhadi	
2011 29	Beloved Sky	Dariush Mehrjui and Vahideh Mohammadifar	
2011 29	Alzheimer	Ahmad-Reza Mo'tamedi	
2011 29	Crime	Masoud Kimiai	
2011 29	Facing Mirrors	Negar Azarbaijani and Fereshteh Taerpour	
2011 29	Mr. Yousef	Ali Rafi'i	
2011 29	Dragonfly's Pond	Alireza Talebzadeh	
2012 30	Bulletproof	Mostafa Kiayee	
2012 30	Kissing the Moon-Like Face	Homayoun Ass'adian	
2012 30	Days of Life	Parviz Sheikhtadi	
2012 30	The Queen	Mohammad-Reza Gohari and Mohammad-Ali Bashe-Ahangar	
2012 30	Orange Suit	Vahideh Mohammadifar and Dariush Mehrjui	
2013 31	Bending the Rules	Behnam Behzadi	
2013 31	Trapped	Parviz Shahbazi	
2013 31	The Corridor	Ali Asghari	
2013 31	Sinners	Sam Gharibian	
2013 31	Give Back	Alireza Talebzadeh	
2014 32	Azar, Shahdokht, Parviz and Others	Behrouz Afkhami	
2014 32	Raspberry	Saman Salur	
2014 32	Sensitive Floor	Peyman GhasemKhani	
2014 32	Special Line	Mostafa Kiayee	
2014 32	Snow	Hossein Mahkam	
2015 33	Time to Love	Roya Mohaghegh	
2015 33	The Long Farewell	Asghar Abdollahi	
2015 33	Crazy Rook	Mohammad-Reza Gohari	
2015 33	I Am Diego Maradona	Bahram Tavakoli	
2016 34	Life and A Day	Saeed Roustayi	
2016 34	Mina's Choice	Farhad Tohidi and Morteza Esfahani	
2016 34	When Did You See Sahar Last Time?	Amir Arabi	
2016 34	Daughter	Mehran Kashani	
2016 34	Standing in the Dust	Mohammad-Hossein Mahdavian	
2017 35	Ferrari	Kambuzia Partovi	
2017 35	Villa Dwellers	Arsalan Amiri and Monir Gheydi	
2017 35	Blockage	Saeed Roustayi	
2017 35	No Date, No Signature	Vahid Jalilvand and Ali Zarnegar	
2017 35	Searing Summer	Payam Karami	
2018 36	Truck	Kambuzia Partovi	
2018 36	Sheeple	Houman Seyyedi	
2018 36	Bomb: A Love Story	Payman Maadi	
2018 36	Under Water Cypress	Mohammad-Ali Bashe-Ahangar and Hamed Bashe-Ahangar	
2018 36	Flaming	Hadi Moghadamdoost and Hamid Nematollah	
2019 37	Castle of Dreams	Mohsen Gharaie and Mohammad Davoudi	
2019 37	Swear	Mohsen Tanabandeh	
2019 37	The Warden	Nima Javidi	
2019 37	Talla	Parviz Shahbazi	
2019 37	When the Moon Was Full	Narges Abyar and Morteza Esfahani	
2020 38	The Sun	Majid Majidi and Nima Javidi	
2020 38	Day Zero	Saeid Malekan and Bahram Tavakoli	
2020 38	Butterfly Stroke	Mohammad Kart, Hossein Doumari and Pedram Pour-Amiri	
2020 38	The Ballad of A White Cow	Behtash Sanaeeha, Maryam Moqadam and Mehrdad Kouroshnia	
2020 38	Bone Marrow	Ali Zarnegar	
2020 38	I'm Scared	Behnam Behzadi and Sahar Sakhaei	
2021 39	Zalava	Arsalan Amiri, Ida Panahandeh, Tahmineh Bahram	
2021 39	TiTi	Arsalan Amiri, Ida Panahandeh	
2021 39	Mom	Arash Anisi	
2022 40	Grassland	Kazem Daneshi	
2022 40	The Situation of Mehdi	Ebrahim Amini, Hadi Hejazifar	
2022 40	The Last Snow	Amir Hossein Asgari, Amir Mohammad Abdi, Seyyed Hassan Hosseini	
2022 40	The Night Guardian	Reza Mirkarimi, Mohammad Davoudi – The Night Guardian	
2022 40	No Prior Appointment	Farhad Tohidi, Mehdi Torab Beigi	
2023 41	In the Arms of the Tree	Babak Khajeh Pasha	
2023 41	Smart Kid	Ali Ramezan	
2023 41	Number Ten	Hamid Zargarnejad	
2023 41	The Leather Jacket Man	Masoud Hasheminejad	
2023 41	Metropol Cinema	Mohammad Ali Bashe Ahangar, Hamed Bashe Ahangar	
2023 41	My Name is Love	Pedram Pour-Amiri, Hossein Doumari	
2024 42	No Winner		
2024 42	Parviz Khan	Ali Saghafi	
2024 42	The Morning of The Execution	Behrouz Afkhami	
2024 42	Summer Time	Mahmoud Kalari	

== Most wins and nominations ==
Most nominations
Nominations	Director
9	Dariush Mehrjui
7	Parviz Shahbazi
7	Majid Majidi
6	Ebrahim Hatamikia
5	Behrouz Afkhami
4	Asghar Farhadi
4	Vahideh Mohammadifar
4	Kambuzia Partovi
3	Abbas Kiarostami
3	Alireza Davoodnejad
3	Masoud Jafari Jozani
3	Rasoul Mollagholipour
3	Rakhshan Bani-Etemad
3	Farid Mostafavi
3	Reza Mirkarimi
3	Mohammad-Reza Gohari

Most wins
Wins	Director
4	Kambuzia Partovi
2	Dariush Mehrjui
2	Rakhshan Bani-Etemad
2	Farid Mostafavi
2	Majid Majidi

== Crystal Simorgh for Best Adapted Screenplay ==
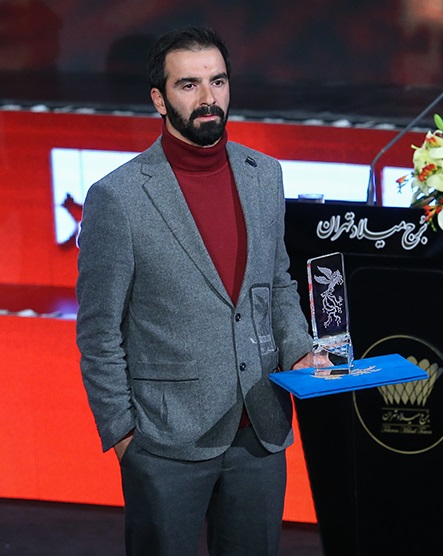
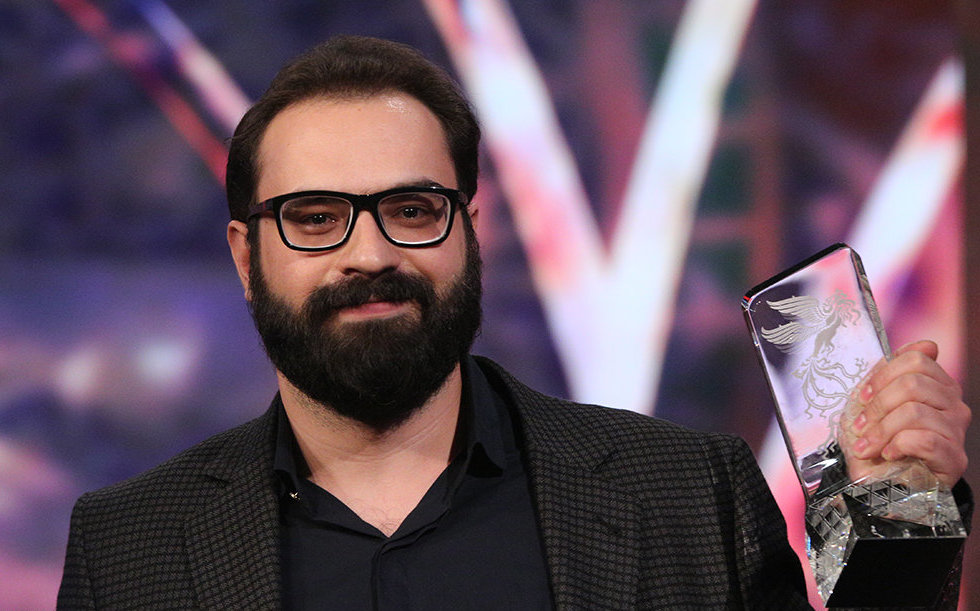
Crystal Simorgh for Best Adapted Screenplay Gharaie Davoudi
- Country: Iran
- Presented by: Fajr International Film Festival
- First award: 2009
- Currently held by: Mohammad Davoudi and Mohsen Gharaie for Without Everything (2021)
- Website: fajrfilmfestival.com

Crystal Simorgh for Best Adapted Screenplay is an award which established in 2006 but only awarded four times in 2009, 2010, 2012 and 2021. Nominations of this award were not announced.

=== Winners ===
Table key
Winner
Winner of the Honorary Diploma

Year	Film	Screenwriter(s)	Source Material(s)	Ref.(s)
2006 24	No Winner			
2006 24	The Persian Prince	Mohammad Nourizad	The epic Battle of Rostam and Esfandiyār from Shahnameh	
2009 27	Doubt	Varuzh Karim-Masihi	Hamlet by William Shakespeare	
2010 28	Forty Years Old	Mostafa Rastegari	The novel by Nahid Tabatabaei	
2012 30	The Last Step	Ali Mosaffa	The short story "The Dead" in Dubliners by James Joyce and the novella The Death of Ivan Ilyich by Leo Tolstoy	
2021 39	Without Everything	Mohammad Davoudi, Mohsen Gharaie	Friedrich Dürrenmatt's play The Visit	
2021 39	Once Upon a Time, Abadan	Hamid Reza Azarang	Based on a Play	
2021 39	Yadoo	Mehdi Jafari, Mahin Abbas Zadeh	Samad Taheri's eleven short stories ''The Lion Wound''	
