= Special Jury Prize (Fajr International Film Festival) =

Category of film award

Crystal Simorgh of Special Jury Prize
- Country: Iran
- Presented by: Fajr International Film Festival
- First award: 1984
- Currently held by: Ghorbanali Taherfar for Projectionist (2024)

Highlights
- Most wins: Dariush Mehrjui (3); Alireza Davoodnejad (3)
- Website: fajrfilmfestival.com

The Special Jury Prize is an award presented annually by the Fajr International Film Festival held in Iran.

== Winners ==
Table key
Winner
Winner of the Honorary Diploma

Year	Film	Winner(s)	for	N.	Notes	Ref.(s)
1984 2	Land of Lovers (Note: Crystal Simorgh statuette awarded from 7th FIFF on 1989.)	Ministry of Islamic Guidance	Film	—N/a	—N/a	
1986 4	First Graders	IIDCYA	Film	—N/a	—N/a	
1986 4	The Spring	IRIB TV1	Film	—N/a	—N/a	
1987 5	Where Is the Friend's Home?	Alireza Zarrin	Film	Yes	—N/a	
1988 6	Kani-Manga	Abdollah Bakideh	Film	—N/a	—N/a	
1988 6	Little Bird of Happiness	Sirous Taslimi	Film	—N/a	—N/a	
1988 6	Little Bird of Happiness	Atieh Masoumi	Juvenile	—N/a	—N/a	
1989 7	The Scout	Ebrahim Hatamikia	Director	No	—N/a	
1989 7	Pomegranate and Cane	Saeed Ebrahimifar	Director	No	—N/a	
1990 8	Hamoun	Dariush Mehrjui and Haroun Yashayaei	Film	Yes	—N/a	
1990 8	Close-Up	Alireza Zarrin	Film	Yes	—N/a	
1991 9	Portrait of Love	Shahrokh Dastour-Tabar	Film	Yes	—N/a	
1992 10	Travellers	Bahram Beyzai, Khosro Khosravi, Majid Roudiani and Abbas Sheikhzadeh	Film	Yes	—N/a	
1993 11	Shame	Kiumars Pourahmad	Director	No	—N/a	
1994 12	The Epic of Majnun	Jamal Shurjeh	Director	Yes	—N/a	
1994 12	Tic Tac	Mohammad-Ali Talebi	Director	No	—N/a	
1995 13	Kimia	Pakhshiran	Film	Yes	—N/a	
1996 14	The Survivor	Manouchehr Mohammadi, Manouchehr Asgarinasab and Seifollah Dad	Film	Yes	—N/a	
1997 15	Land of the Sun	Farabi Cinema Foundation	Film	Yes	—N/a	
1998 16	The May Lady	Rakhshan Bani-Etemad	Director	Yes	—N/a	
1999 17	Sweet Agony	Alireza Davoodnejad and Ali Vajed-Samii	Film	No	—N/a	
2000 18	Maturity	Masoud Jafari Jozani, Fathollah Jafari Jozani and Abbas Haghighi	Film	No	—N/a	
2001 19	Under the Moonlight	Manouchehr Mohammadi	Film	Yes	—N/a	
2002 20	The Exam	Nasser Refaei	Director	Yes	—N/a	
2002 20	Unruled Paper	Nasser Taghvai	Director	Yes	—N/a	
2003 21	The Wind Carpet	Kamal Tabrizi	Director	No	—N/a	
2004 22	The Lizard	Parviz Parastui	Actor	Yes	—N/a	
2004 22	A Trilogy (Third episode)	Rakhshan Bani-Etemad	Director	No	—N/a	
2005 23	A Piece of Bread	Kamal Tabrizi	Director	No	—N/a	
2006 24	Friday Evening	Mona Zandi Haghighi	Director	Yes	—N/a	
2006 24	Rival Wife	Alireza Davoodnejad	Director	No	—N/a	
2006 24	How Much You Want to Cry?	Shahed Ahmadloo	Director	No	—N/a	
2007 25	Not awarded					
2008 26	—N/a	Alireza Zarrindast	—N/a	—N/a	"for technical and artistic lifetime achievements"	
2009 27	Karat 14	Parviz Shahbazi	Film	No	—N/a	
2010 28	40 Years Old	Alireza Raisian	Director	Yes	—N/a	
2010 28	Gold and Copper	Homayoun Ass'adian	Director	Yes	—N/a	
2011 29	Beloved Sky	Dariush Mehrjui	Director	Yes	—N/a	
2012 30	Orange Suit	Dariush Mehrjui	Director	Yes	—N/a	
2013 31	Actors Studio	Alireza Davoodnejad	Director	Yes	—N/a	
2014 32	Hard Makeup	Hamid Nematollah	Director	Yes	—N/a	
2014 32	Track 143	Narges Abyar	Director	No	—N/a	
2015 33	—N/a	Javad Norouzbeigi	—N/a	—N/a	"for producing of I Am Diego Maradona, Confessions of My Dangerous Mind and Avalanche"	
2015 33	—N/a	Niki Karimi	—N/a	—N/a	"for directing and producing of Night Shift, and acting in the Death of the Fish and Wednesday, May 9"	
2016 34	Standing in the Dust	Mohammad-Hossein Mahdavian	Director	Yes	—N/a	
2016 34	The Sound and the Fury	Houman Seyyedi	Director	No	—N/a	
2017 35	Ferrari	Alireza Davoodnejad	Director	Yes	—N/a	
2018 36	Bomb: A Love Story	Payman Maadi	Director	Yes	—N/a	
2019 37	The Warden	Nima Javidi	Director	Yes	—N/a	
2020 38	Day Zero	Saeid Malekan	Director	Yes	—N/a	
2020 38	Sun Children	Rouhollah Zamani, Shamila Shirzad, Abolfazl Shirzad, Seyyed Mohammad Mehdi Mousavifard	Ensemble cast	No	—N/a	
2021 39	Without Everything	Javad Norouzbeigi	Film	Yes	—N/a	
2022 40	The Last Snow	Amir Hossein Asgari	Director	Yes	—N/a	
2023 41	Mud Room	Davoud Sabouri	Film	Yes	—N/a	
2024 42	Projectionist	Ghorbanali Taherfar	Director	Yes	—N/a	
