= Laleh Marzban =

Iranian actress (born 1994)

- لاله مرزبان
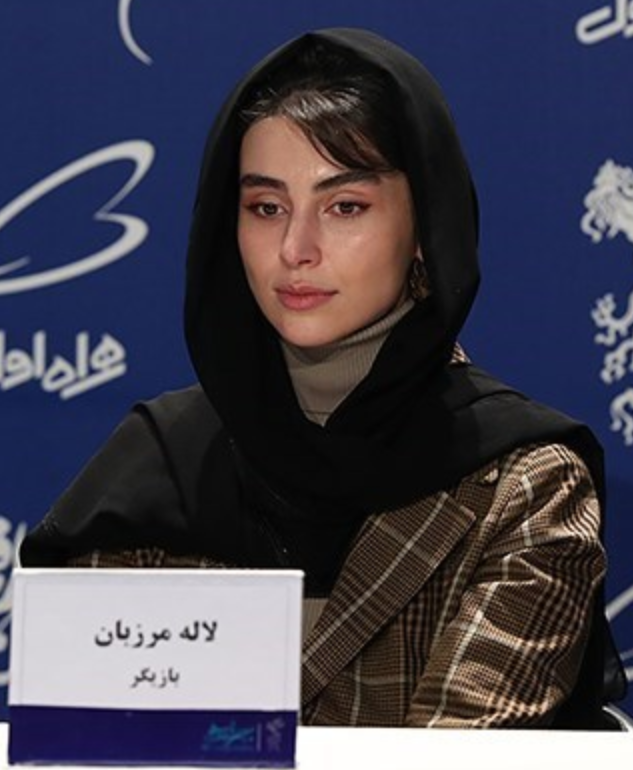
- Marzban at the 2022 Fajr Film Festival
- Born: January 19, 1994 (age 32); Azna, Lorestan, Iran
- Occupation: Actress
- Years active: 2010–present

Laleh Marzban (Persian: لاله مرزبان; born January 19, 1994) is an Iranian actress. She is best known for her roles in Majority (2021), and The Night Guardian (2022). For her performance in Falling House (2026), Marzban won the Orizzonti award for Best Actress at the 83rd Venice International Film Festival.

== Early life ==
Laleh Marzban was born on January 19, 1994, in Azna, Lorestan, Iran.

== Career ==
Marzban gained her first acting experience in 2010 with the television series Black Intelligence. She showcased her talent through her performance in the film Under the Smoky Roof (2016).

Among the films in which she has acted are Hush! Girls Don't Scream (2013), Under the Smoky Roof (2016), Damascus Time (2017), and New Moon Hotel (2018).

Some of the television series in which she has appeared include Setayesh 3 (2018), Anam (2017), and Black Intelligence (2010).

In September 2026, she received the award for best newcomer at the Venice Film Festival and, speaking in Farsi, she said she would dedicate her prize to "the women of my country who have paid the highest price for even the smallest measure of freedom."

== Filmography ==
=== Film ===
| Year | Title | Role | Director | Notes | Ref(s) |
|---|---|---|---|---|---|
| 2013 | Hush! Girls Don't Scream | Shirin's classmate | Pouran Derakhshandeh | | |
| 2017 | Under the Smoky Roof | Kiana | Pouran Derakhshandeh | | |
| 2017 | Cousins | Secretary Ghafari | Roohangiz Shams | | |
| 2018 | Damascus Time | Leila | Ebrahim Hatamikia | | |
| 2018 | Gray | | Laleh Marzban | Short film, also as producer | |
| 2019 | New Moon Hotel | Mona Tavakol | Takefumi Tsutsui | | |
| 2019 | Aysan | Female employee | Mehrshad Kheradmandi | Short film | |
| 2021 | Majority | Asieh | Mohsen Gharaee | | |
| 2021 | Dang | | Khashayer Atefi | Short film | |
| 2022 | The Night Guardian | Nasibeh | Reza Mirkarimi | | |
| 2026 | Falling House | Ensi | Mohsen Gharaee | | |
| TBA | Court | | Ali Hazrati | | |
| TBA | Her Eyes | | Bahman Farmanara | | |

=== Web ===
| Year | Title | Role | Director | Platform | Notes | Ref(s) |
|---|---|---|---|---|---|---|
| 2025 | Aban | Aban Esfandiyari | Reza Dadooi | Sheyda | Leading role | |

=== Television ===
| Year | Title | Role | Director | Network | Notes | Ref(s) |
|---|---|---|---|---|---|---|
| 2010 | Black Intelligence | Zohreh | Masoud Abparvar | IRIB TV3 | Recurring role | |
| 2018 | My Mother | Afarin Servatian | Javad Afshar | IRIB TV3 | Main role | |
| 2019 | Setayesh | Nazgol Ferdos | Saeed Soltani | IRIB TV3 | Main role; season 3 | |

== Theater ==
| Year | Title | Playwright | Director | Stage | Ref(s) |
|---|---|---|---|---|---|
| 2016 | Blood Wedding | Federico García Lorca | Ehsan Malmir | Mehrab Theater | |
| 2017–2018 | I am Oscar! | Mohammad Reza Sattari | Mohammad Reza Sattari | Paliz Theater | |
| 2018 | The Other | Mohammad Hatami | Mohammad Hatami | Hafez Hall | |
| 2020 | Le Prénom | Matthieu Delaporte, Alexandre de la Patellière | Reza Javidi | Shahrzad Theater Complex | |

== Awards and nominations ==
Name of the award ceremony, year presented, category, nominee of the award, and the result of the nomination
| Award | Year | Category | Nominated work | Result | Lost to | Ref(s) |
|---|---|---|---|---|---|---|
| Fajr Film Festival | 2022 | Best Actress in a Leading Role | The Night Guardian | Nominated | Tannaz Tabatabaei (Without Her) | |
| Hafez Awards | 2023 | Best Actress – Motion Picture | The Night Guardian | Nominated | Elnaz Shakerdoost (Titi), Sadaf Espahbodi (Grassland) | |
| Iran's Film Critics and Writers Association | 2025 | Best Actress in a Leading Role | The Night Guardian | Nominated | Sara Bahrami (The Orange Forest) | |
| Venice International Film Festival | 2026 | The Orizzonti for Best Actress | Falling House | Won | | |

== See also ==
- Iranian women
- Iranian cinema
- Fajr International Film Festival
