= The Last Snow =

- Film poster
- Directed by: Amir Hossein Asgari
- Written by: Amir Hossein Asgari; Amir Mohammad Abdi; Seyyed Hassan Hosseini
- Produced by: Hassan Mostafavi
- Starring: Amin Hayai; Ladan Mostofi; Majid Salehi; Nooshin Masoudian
- Cinematography: Arman Fayaz
- Edited by: Esmaeel Alizadeh
- Music by: Masoud Sekhavatdoust
- Production company: Vanya Old Media Art Cultural Institute
- Release dates: February 1, 2022 (FIFF); December 18, 2024 (Iran)
- Running time: 110 minutes
- Country: Iran
- Language: Persian

The Last Snow (Persian: برف آخر, romanized: Barf-e Ākhar) is a 2022 Iranian drama film directed by Amir Hossein Asgari and written by Asgari, Amir Mohammad Abdi and Hassan Hosseini. The film screened for the first time at the 40th Fajr Film Festival and received 4 awards and earned 9 nominations.

Three years after the first screening, the film was released on December 18, 2024 in Iran theatrically.

== Premise ==
Yousef is a successful and committed veterinarian who lives in kiasar a village in Sari, Iran. The film revolves around the disappearance of the daughter of Yousef's friend, Khalil, whose name is Khorshid. It is not clear what exactly happened to Khorshid, all the members of the village look for her sympathetically until a secret is revealed.

== Cast ==
- Amin Hayai as Yousef
- Ladan Mostofi as Rana
- Majid Salehi as Khalil
- Nooshin Masoudian as Zari
- Mohammad Sadegh Malek
- Amir Mashhadi Abbas as Isa
- Amir Abbas Roudgar Safari
- Mehdi Mehraban

== Reception ==
=== Critical response ===
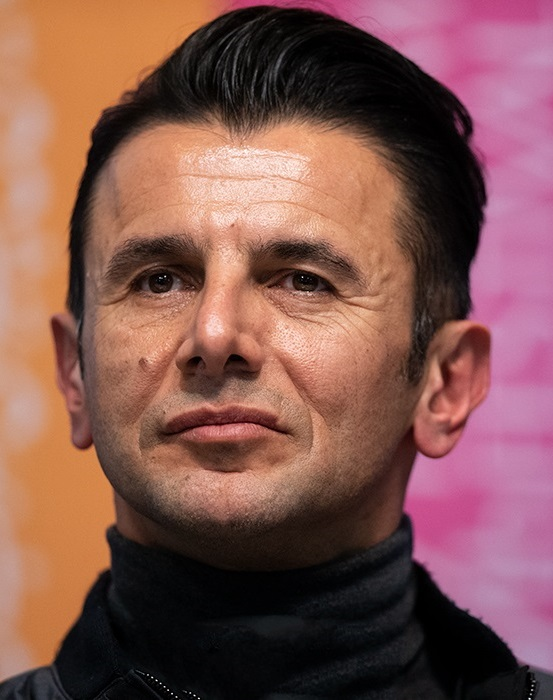
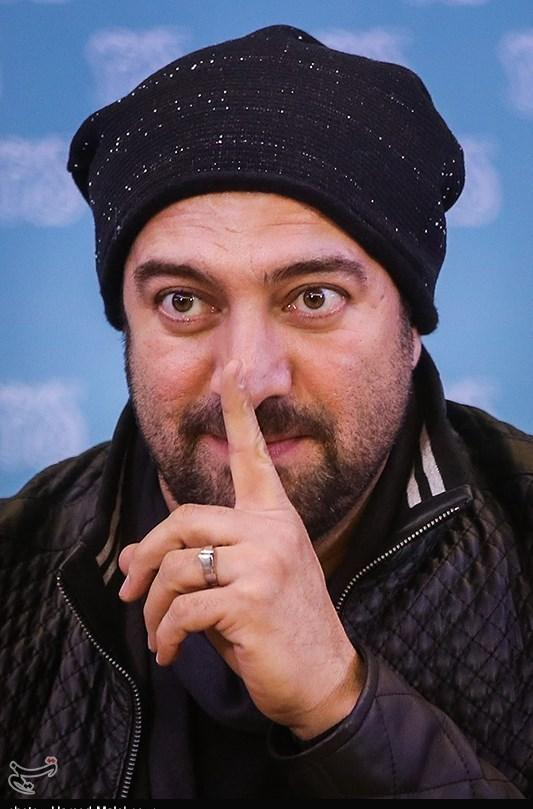
The performances of Amin Hayai and Majid Salehi garnered critical acclaim and both received Crystal Simorgh nominations for Best Actor and Best Supporting Actor, respectively, with Hayai winning.

=== Accolades ===
Year	Award	Category	Recipient	Result	Ref.
2022	Fajr Film Festival	Best Film	Hassan Mostafavi	Nominated	
2022	Fajr Film Festival	Best Director	Amir Hossein Asgari	Nominated	
2022	Fajr Film Festival	Best Screenplay	Amir Hossein Asgari, Amir Mohammad Abdi, Seyyed Hassan Hosseini	Nominated	
2022	Fajr Film Festival	Special Jury Prize	Amir Hossein Asgari	Won	
2022	Fajr Film Festival	Best Actor	Amin Hayai	Won	
2022	Fajr Film Festival	Best Actress	Ladan Mostofi	Nominated	
2022	Fajr Film Festival	Best Supporting Actor	Majid Salehi	Nominated	
2022	Fajr Film Festival	Best Supporting Actress	Nooshin Masoudian	Nominated	
2022	Fajr Film Festival	Best Cinematography	Arman Fayaz	Won	
2022	Fajr Film Festival	Best Costume Design	Ali Nasirinia	Nominated	
2022	Fajr Film Festival	Best Production Design	Ali Nasirinia	Nominated	
2022	Fajr Film Festival	Best Makeup	Omid Golzadeh	Won	
2022	Fajr Film Festival	Best Visual Effects	Kamyar Shafiepour	Nominated	
