= Majid Salehi =

Iranian actor, T.V series & movie director, writer and film producer

- مجید صالحی
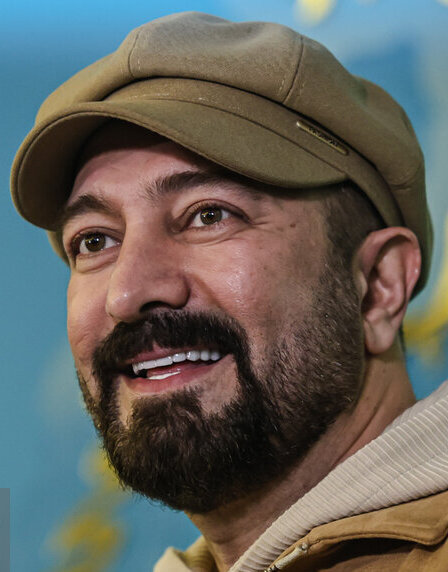
- Salehi in 2025
- Born: Majid Salehi; September 17, 1975 (age 50); Tehran, Iran
- Occupations: Actor; director; screenwriter
- Years active: 1992–present
- Children: 2

Majid Salehi (Persian: مجید صالحی; born September 17, 1975) is an Iranian actor, screenwriter and producer. He has received various accolades, including a Crystal Simorgh and a Hafez Award, in addition to nominations for four Hafez Awards, an Iran Cinema Celebration Award and an Iran's Film Critics and Writers Association Award.

== Career ==
Seyed Majid Salehi was born in Amin Al-Molk St. (Emamzadeh Hassan), Tehran. After graduating in mathematics and physics at the age of eighteen, he attended the acting classes of Hamid Samandarian at Rassam Honar Acting Institute and pursued this career seriously.

In his interview, made by Fereidoun Jayrani on Dec. 16 2017, in the live program of “Thirty-five”, Majid Salehi talked about many parts of his life, including the films and TV series he has played in.

He started his art career by acting in “Dr. Jooshkar” and “Antigone” plays. Then, he continued with TV, and he wrote, acted, and directed various TV series, often with child and humor themes. Soon he became famous with the “Majid Delbandam” character, and this process continued with other programs. When Hamid Jebelli's withdrew from “Yeki Bood, Yeki Nabood”, he became his substitute, and that film became his first attempt to enter the field of cinema. In addition to acting in some of the TV series, he has also undertaken writing and directing. Most of the films in which Salehi has played a role were among the bestseller movies. Movies such as “Dog Day Afternoon”, “the Singles”, “the 40-year-old Single”, etc. indicate that he is a trustworthy and of course, a popular actor. As he himself says, he is a lucky actor. He has also produced a few short films.

He graduated from Tehran Faculty of Arts and Architecture with the bachelor's degree of Theater Acting and Directing in 2001. Obtaining his master's degree in 2015 in the same field. Currently, he teaches at Andisheh Mahan Cultural and Art Institute under the supervision of Amir Dezhakam.

=== Artistic Event ===
Year	Position	Artistic Event
2022	Member of Jury Committee	The 11th Shahrvand Lahijan Street Theater Festival
2019	Member of Jury Committee	Life Umbrella National Street Theater Festival, Yazd [2]
2019	Member of Jury Committee of Street Theater Category	The 38th Fajr International Theater Festival [3]
2019	Member of Jury Committee	15th National Mehr Theater Festival, Kashan [4]
2019	Judge of Ritual and Traditional Category	14th International Street Theater Festival, Marivan [5]
2018	Judge of Street Theater Category	The 6th Isar National Theater Festival, Kermanshah [6]
2017	Judge	The 2nd Sharhani Regional Street Theater Festival, Dehloran [7]
2017	Member of Jury Committee	The Judges of the selection committee of the art works for Chelcheragh International Festival
2016	Member of Selection Committee	Student Festival Theater Selection Council
2015	Member of Jury Committee	The Sixth Provincial Festival of Short Stage Performances in Markazi Province [8] [9]
2011	Member of Selection Committee	The Selection Committee of Cinematic Works in Shahr International Film Festival
2000	Member of Jury Committee and the Host of Closing Ceremony	International Children's Film Festival

== Filmography ==
=== Film ===
Year	Title	Role	Director	Name in Farsi	Notes
1999	Once Upon a Time	Majid	Iraj Tahmasb	Yeki bod Yeki nabod	First movie in cinema
2004	Girls' Dormitory	Farhad	Mohammad Hossein Latifi	khab gah Dokhtaran	
2004	Singles	Shahkar	Asghar Hashemi	Mojarad ha	
2005	Foreign Souvenir	Manuchehr	Kamran Ghadakchian	Soghat Farang	
2005	A Flower for the Bride	Naser	Ghodratollah Solh Mirzayi	Shakhe Goli baraye aroos	
2006	Bridge 13th	Gholam	Farhad Gharib	Pole 13	
2006	Left Handed		Arash Moayerian	Chap Dast	
2008	Deldadeh	Karim	Ghodratollah Solh Mirzayi	Deldadeh	
2009	Whatever You Want	Gholam	Mohammad Motevaselani	Harchi to bekhaei	
2009	Wedding Rings	Hamid	Shahin Babapour	Halghe haye Ezdevaj	
2010	Marriage in the Extra Time	keivan	Saeed Soheili	Ezdevaj dar vaght Ezafe	
2010	A Very Dog Day Afternoon	Farshid	Mostafa Kiayee	Bad az Zohre Sagi	
2011	No Entry for alives	Zabih	Javad Mozdabadi	Vorod zendeha mamno	
2011	Mixed Pizza	Manoucher/ Title Singer	Hossein Ghasemi Jami	Pizza Makhloot	
2012	Everything is calm	Ebi	Mostafa Mansouryar	Hamechi Arome	
2014	Single 40 years old	Reza	Shahin Babapour	Mojarad 40 saleh	
2014	Nazanin	Saman	Mehdi Golestaneh	Nazanin	
2015	Absolute Rest	Saber	Abdolreza Kahani	Esterahat Motlagh	Won – Hafez Award for Best Actor Motion Picture Nominated – Iran Cinema Celebration Award for Best Supporting Actor Nominated – Iran's Film Critics and Writers Association Award for Best Supporting Actor
2017	Endless Lights	Jalal	Mostafa Soltani	Cheragh haye natamam	
2017	Three Strangers	Adam / Bahram	Mehdi Mazlomi	3 Biganeh	
2017	The Record Is Equal To The Document	Kia	Bahman Goodarzi	Sabt ba sanad barabar ast	
2017	Me and Sharmin	Mani	Bizhan Shirmarz	Man o Sharmin	
2017	Cousins	Sasan	Roohangiz Shams	Dokhtar amo persar amo	
2018	We are so cool	Farhad	Bahman Godarzi	Ma Kheyli Bahalim	
2018	I'm Not Crazy	Kami	Alireza Amini	Man Divane Nistam	
2018	Columbus	Manouchehr (Michael)	Hatef Alimardani	Columbus	Nominated – Hafez Award for Best Actor Motion Picture
2019	Silent Sounds	Naser Yazdani	Soha bano Zolghadr	Sedashaye khamosh	
2019	Kingslayer	Meysam	Vahid Amirkhani	Shah Kosh	
2021	Staging	Sabzavari	Ali Shah Hatami	Sahne Zani	
2022	The Last Snow	Khalil	Amir Hossein Asgari	Barfe Akahr	Nominated – Crystal Simorgh Fajr Film Festival Award for Best Supporting Actor
2022	breathe	producer & director	Amir Nouri Majid salehi	Nafas Bekesh	Award for Best Narrative Short Film in CROSSING THE SCREEN INTERNATIONAL FILM FESTIVAL
2023	The Number 10	number 10	Hamid zargar nejad	shomare 10	Won Crystal Simorgh Fajr Film Festival Award for Best Actor
2023	Terrestrial Verses	Siamak	Alireza Khatami, Ali Asgari	Ayeh haye zamini	

=== As director ===
Year	Title	Director	Type
2022	Breathe	Majid Salehi	Short film
2020	M Show	Majid Salehi	Talk Show
2019	Under the Supervision	Majid Salehi	Cinema film
2019	The Years Away from Home	Majid Salehi	Video CD
2012	Nish	Majid Salehi	TV film
2010	Wave and rock	Majid Salehi	TV series
2009	Mish	Majid Salehi	TV film
2007	Seh Dar Chahar	Majid Salehi	TV series
2003	Ashti konan	Majid Salehi	TV series

=== Web ===
Year	Title	Role	Director	Platform
2014–2015	Fool	Manouchehr Shokouhi	Kamal Tabrizi	Video CD
2015–2016	Aspirin	Arman	Farhad Najafi	Video CD
2021	Siavash	Saber Saghi	Soroush Mohammadzadeh	Namava
2022	Made in Iran	Morteza	Bahman Goodarzi	Filimo
2025	Savushun		Narges Abyar	Namava

=== TV Film ===
Year	Title	Role	Director
2014	Anti beat	Actor	Hadi Shamani
2013	DeadEnd	Actor	Manouchehr Hadi
2013	I Am Worker	Actor	Ali Tohidparasst
2010	The Trap	Actor	Esmaeil Falahpour
2010	Last Single	Actor	Mohammadreza Fazeli
2007	Spy Game	Actor	Mohammadreza Fazeli
2008	A blue sky on the ceiling of my room	Actor	Mojtaba Cheraghali
2004	A normal day	Actor	Hassan Fathi

=== TV series ===
Production Year	Title	Position	Director	Role	Broadcast Year	Network
2016	We Relaxed	Actor	Rouhollah Sohrabi	Masoud	---	2
2014	The Madineh	Actor	Cyrus Moghadam	Aziz	Ramadhan 2014	1
2013	Colonel's Garden	Actor	Felora Sam	Arsalan	2013	5
2012	Be Awake	Actor & director Advisor	Ahmad Kavari	Gorzin	2012	1
2010	Se Dong Se Dong	Guest Actor	Shahed Ahmadlou	-----	Ramadhan 2011	5
2010	Wave and rock	Actor & director	Majid Salehi	Chavosh	April 2011	5
2008	This Eid	Actor	Saeed Aghakhani	Mansour	April 2009	5
2007	Se Dar Chahar	Actor & director	Majid Salehi	Amir Mezghounchi	2008	1
2006	Sweet & Sour	Actor & director Advisor	Reza Attaran	Majid	April 2007	3
2006	Life's good scent	Actor	Ali Shah Hatami	Mojtaba Salehi	Ramadhan 2006	5
2005	Mordeh-e Moteharrek	Actor	Reza Karimi		Ramadhan 2005	1
2004	Khosh Gheirat	Actor	Ali Shah Hatami	Ezzati	April 2005	1
2003	O+	Actor	Ali Shah Hatami	Majid Zokaee	April 2004	1
2003	Acacia Alley	Actor	Reza Attaran	Ghoshtasb	2003	5
2002	Khosh Rekab	Actor	Ali Shah Hatami	Ezatti	April 2003	1
2001	Polise Javan	Actor	Cyrus Moghadam	Guest Actor		3
2001	Under the City's Skin	Actor	Mehran Ghafourian	Foolad	2002	3
2001	Khaneh Pedari	Actor	Fereidoun Hassanpour		2001	5
2000	Roozhaye Mahtabi	Actor	Abbas Ghanbari, Sepehr Mohammadi		2001	5
1999-2000	Eternal Train	Actor	Reza Attaran	Robin Hood & Hasan Kachal & Psychotic patient	2000	1
1998	Majid Delbandam	Actor & Voice actor & Assistant Director	Reza Attaran	Majid	1998	1
1997	Sibe khande	Actor	Reza Attaran		1997	1

== Theatre ==
Year	Theater	Director
2015	Che Mikone in Adel Ferdousipour	Hossein Heidaripour
2013	Dar Shooreh Zar	Hossein Kiani
2013	Shayeaat	Rahman Seifi Azad
2009	Piche Tond	Rahman Seifi Azad
2008	Kaboos-haye Yek Piremarde Bazneshastehe Khaene Tarsoo	Nader Borhani Marand
2001	Shabneshini Dar Jahanam	Rahman Seifi Azad
2000	Antigone	Hamed Mohammad Taheri

== Awards and nominations ==
Year	Title
1995	Honorary Diploma of Actor in the International Ritual and Traditional Theater Festival for Siah va Haft Kachaloon Play
1998	Special Appreciation Reward in the International Puppet Festival for Looti va Antari Play
2002	The Best Actor of Year of Television (Comedy) for Khosh Rekab Series
2002	Nominee in the Category of Best (Comedy) Actor in the Hafez Awards for Khosh Rekab Series
2007	The Best Actor of Year of Television (Comedy) for Sweet and Sour (aka Torsh va Shirin) Series
2008	The Best Actor of Year of Television (Comedy) for Se Dar Chahar Series
2015	Hafez Awards for The Best Actor in the 15th Hafez Awards for Absolute Rest (aka Esterahat Motlagh) Film
2015	Nominee in the category of Best Supportive Actor in Iran Cinema Celebration for Absolute Rest (aka Esterahat Motlagh) Film
2015	Nominee in the Category of Best Supportive Actor in the Iranian Film Critics Celebration for Absolute Rest (aka Esterahat Motlagh) Film
2017	Nominee in the Category of Best Actor in Russian Film Festival for Unfinished Lights (aka Cheragh’hay Natamam) Film
2018	Nominee in the Category of Best Actor in the Hafez Awards for Columbus
2021	Nominee in the Category of Best Supportive Actor in the 40th Fajr Film Festival for The Last Snow (aka Barfe Akhar)
2021	Nominee in the Category of Best Actor of Drama in the 21st Cinema / TV Donyaye Tasvir Celebration for Siavash
2023	Won the Fajr International Film Festival Best Actor in the 41st Fajr Film Festival for (Number 10)

== Social Activities ==
Starting Date	Title
Since 2015	Supporter of Autistic People and People with Down Syndrome
Since 2016	Ambassador for the Fight against Drugs
Since 2020	Member of the Center for Support of Prisoners’ Families
Since 2021	Ambassador to Support for MPS Patients

== See also ==
- Reza Attaran
