= Without Her =

Without Her may refer to:

- "Without Her" (Ringo Starr song), 1970
- "Without Her" (Harry Nilsson song), 1967
- Without Her (2006 film), a Canadian thriller film
- Without Her (2022 film), an Iranian drama mystery thriller film
