= Rouhollah Zamani =

Iranian actor

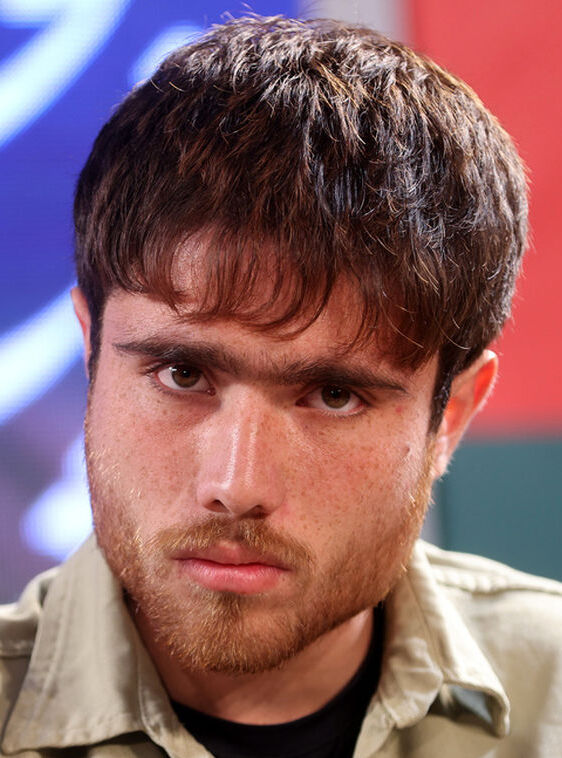
- Zamani in 2026
- Born: Nowjeh Deh, Ardabil, Iran
- Occupation: Actor
- Years active: 2020–present

Rouhollah Zamani (Persian: روح‌الله زمانی) is an Iranian actor, most known for his performance in the film Sun Children (2020), for which he won the Marcello Mastroianni Award at the 77th Venice International Film Festival.

== Career ==
Zamani rose to prominence for his performance as Ali in the acclaimed 2020 drama film Sun Children, which was shortlisted at the 93rd Academy Awards for Best Foreign Language Film. He won a Marcello Mastroianni Award, a Children and Youth International Film Festival Award and a Fajr Film Festival Honorary Diploma for his performance in the 2020 film.

== Filmography ==
=== Film ===
Year	Title	Role	Director	Notes	Ref.
2020	Sun Children	Ali	Majid Majidi	Shortlisted at the 93rd Academy Awards for Best Foreign Language Film	
2022	The Situation of Mehdi	Khosrow Molazadeh	Hadi Hejazifar	Nominated – Crystal Simorgh for Best Supporting Actor	
2023	In the Arms of the Tree		Babak Lotfi Khajehpasha		
2024	Light Blue		Babak Lotfi Khajehpasha		
2024	The West Sky		Mohammad Asgari		
TBA	Matricide		Meysam Mohammadkhani	Short film	

=== Television ===
Year	Title	Role	Director	Notes	Network	Ref.
2023	Ashura	Khosrow Molazadeh	Hadi Hejazifar	TV series	IRIB TV1	

== Awards and nominations ==
Name of the award ceremony, year presented, category, nominee of the award, and the result of the nomination
Award	Year	Category	Nominated Work	Result	Ref.
Asian Film Awards	2021	Best Newcomer	Sun Children	Nominated	
Fajr Film Festival	2020	Special Jury Prize	Sun Children	Honorary Diploma	
Fajr Film Festival	2022	Best Actor in a Supporting Role	The Situation of Mehdi	Nominated	
Fajr Film Festival	2023	Best Actor in a Supporting Role	In the Arms of the Tree	Nominated	
Hafez Awards	2021	Best Actor – Motion Picture	Sun Children	Nominated	
International Film Festival for Children and Youth	2020	Best International Children and Youth Actor	Sun Children	Won	
Urban International Film Festival	2022	Best Actor	Sun Children	Nominated	
Venice International Film Festival	2020	Marcello Mastroianni Award	Sun Children	Won	
