= The Situation of Mehdi =

- Film poster
- Directed by: Hadi Hejazifar
- Written by: Hadi Hejazifar; Ebrahim Amini
- Produced by: Habibollah Valinejad
- Starring: Hadi Hejazifar; Zhila Shahi; Vahid Hejazifar; Masoumeh Rabaninia; Rouhollah Zamani
- Cinematography: Vahid Ebrahimi
- Edited by: Hossein Jamshidi Gohari
- Music by: Masoud Sekhavatdoust
- Production companies: Revayate Fath Foundation; Sima Film
- Distributed by: Bahman Sabz Institute
- Release dates: February 1, 2022 (FIFF); March 9, 2022 (Iran)
- Running time: 100 minutes
- Country: Iran
- Languages: Azeri; Persian
- Budget: 30 billion toman
- Box office: 12.54 billion toman

The Situation of Mehdi (Persian: موقعیت مهدی, romanized: Mogheiyyat-e Mehdi) is a 2022 Iranian biographical war drama film about Mehdi Bakeri, an Iranian war hero in the Iran-Iraq war. The film is directed by Hadi Hejazifar and written by Hejazifar and Ebrahim Amini. The film screened for the first time at the 40th Fajr Film Festival where it won 5 awards and earned 9 nominations.

== Premise ==
Mehdi Bakeri, the commander of the 31st Ashura Division, wants his younger brother Hamid to return to the area and be by his side, despite the difficulties he has encountered, Hamid accepts and joins. Now, after Operation Kheibar, Mehdi has to return home alone.

== Cast ==
- Hadi Hejazifar as Mehdi Bakeri
- Zhila Shahi as Safieh Modares
- Vahid Hejazifar as Hamid Bakeri
- Masoumeh Rabaninia as Maryam
- Rouhollah Zamani as Khosrow
- Hojjat Hassanpour as Kambiz
- Abolfazl Heidari as Hossein
- Vahid Aghapoor

== Reception ==
=== Critical response ===
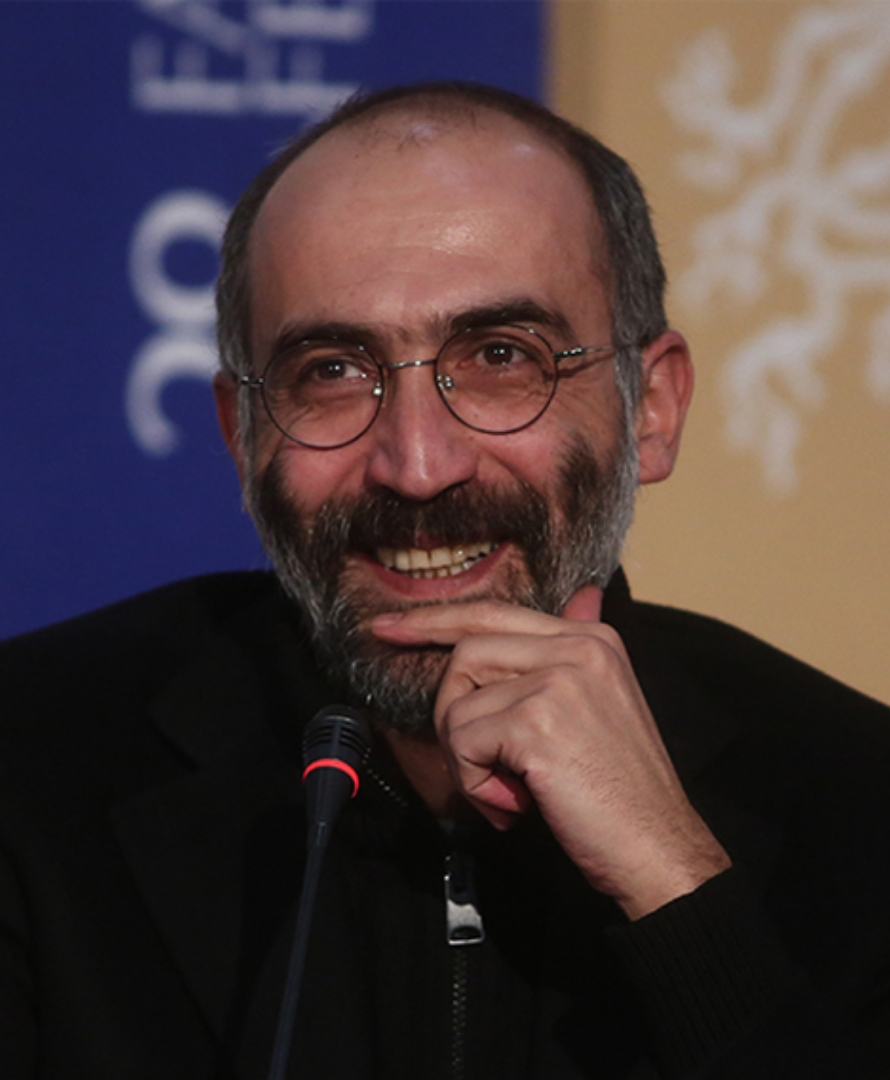
Hadi Hejazifar's directing received critical praise, winning him the Crystal Simorgh for Best First Film.

The Situation of Mehdi is the pride of Cinema of Iran. It deserved to win Crystal Simorgh for Best Actor, Best Actress and Best Director too.

— Haft / Massoud Farasati

=== Accolades ===
Year	Award	Category	Recipient	Result	Ref.
2022	Fajr Film Festival	Best Film	Habibolah Valinejad	Won	
2022	Fajr Film Festival	Best Director	Hadi Hejazifar	Nominated	
2022	Fajr Film Festival	Best Screenplay	Hadi Hejazifar, Ebrahim Amini	Nominated	
2022	Fajr Film Festival	Best Actress	Zhila Shahi	Nominated	
2022	Fajr Film Festival	Best Supporting Actor	Rouhollah Zamani	Nominated	
2022	Fajr Film Festival	Best Cinematography	Vahid Ebrahimi	Nominated	
2022	Fajr Film Festival	Best Editor	Hossein Jamshidi Gohari	Nominated	
2022	Fajr Film Festival	Best Original Score	Masoud Sekhavatdoust	Won	
2022	Fajr Film Festival	Best Sound Recording	Masih Hadpour Seraj	Won	
2022	Fajr Film Festival	Best Makeup	Shahram Khalaj	Nominated	
2022	Fajr Film Festival	Best Costume Design	Behzad Aghabeigi	Nominated	
2022	Fajr Film Festival	Best Production Design	Amir Zaghari	Nominated	
2022	Fajr Film Festival	Best Special Effects	Iman Karamian	Won	
2022	Fajr Film Festival	Best First Film	Hadi Hejazifar	Won	
2022	Urban International Film Festival	Best Film	Habibolah Valinejad	Nominated	
2022	Urban International Film Festival	Best Director	Hadi Hejazifar	Won	
2022	Urban International Film Festival	Best Screenplay	Hadi Hejazifar, Ebrahim Amini	Nominated	
2022	Urban International Film Festival	Best Actor	Hadi Hejazifar	Nominated	
2022	Urban International Film Festival	Best Actress	Zhila Shahi	Nominated	
2022	Urban International Film Festival	Best Technical	Vahid Ebrahimi	Nominated	
