= 40th Fajr Film Festival =

Film festival in Iran

- Opening film: Beyro by Morteza Aliabbas Mirzaei
- Closing film: Linden by Davoud Bidel
- Location: Milad Tower
- Founded: 1983
- No. of films: 40 films
- Festival date: Opening: February 1, 2022; Closing: February 11, 2022
- Website: Fajr Film Festival

Fajr Film Festival
- 41st 39th

40th Fajr Film Awards
- Date: February 11, 2022
- Site: Milad Tower, Tehran, Tehran Province, Iran
- Organised by: Farabi Cinema Foundation; Ministry of Culture and Islamic Guidance

Highlights
- Most awards: The Situation of Mehdi (5)
- Most nominations: The Situation of Mehdi (14)
- Best Film: The Situation of Mehdi
- Special Jury Prize: Amir Hossein Asgari (director) – The Last Snow
- Audience Choice of Best Film: No award given
- Website: Fajr Film Festival

Television/radio coverage
- Network: IRIB Namayesh

The 40th Fajr Film Festival (Persian: چهلمین دوره جشنواره فیلم فجر) was held from 1 to 11 February 2022 in Tehran, Iran. The nominees for the 40th Fajr Film Festival were announced on February 10, 2022, at a press conference.

== Jury ==
=== Main Competition ===
- Masoud Jafari Jozani
- Majid Entezami
- Shahab Hosseini
- Mohammad Ali Basheh Ahangar
- Mohammad Davoudi
- Mehdi Sajadeh Chi
- Pejman Lashkari Pour

=== Documentary ===
- Ahmad Zabeti Jehrami
- Mohammad Tahami Nejad
- Mohammadali Farsi
- Morteza Shabani
- Mohammadreza Abassian

=== Short film ===
- Ahmadreza Motamedi
- Danesh Eghbashavi
- Hamed Jafari

=== Advertising Competition ===
- Ali Nikraftar
- Mehrdad Khoshbakht
- Mohammad Rouhallamin

== Winners and nominees ==
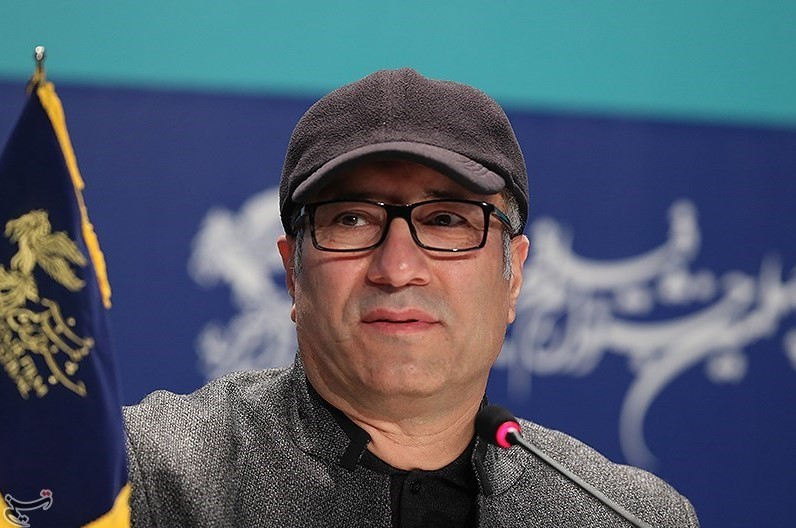
Reza Mirkarimi, Best Director winner

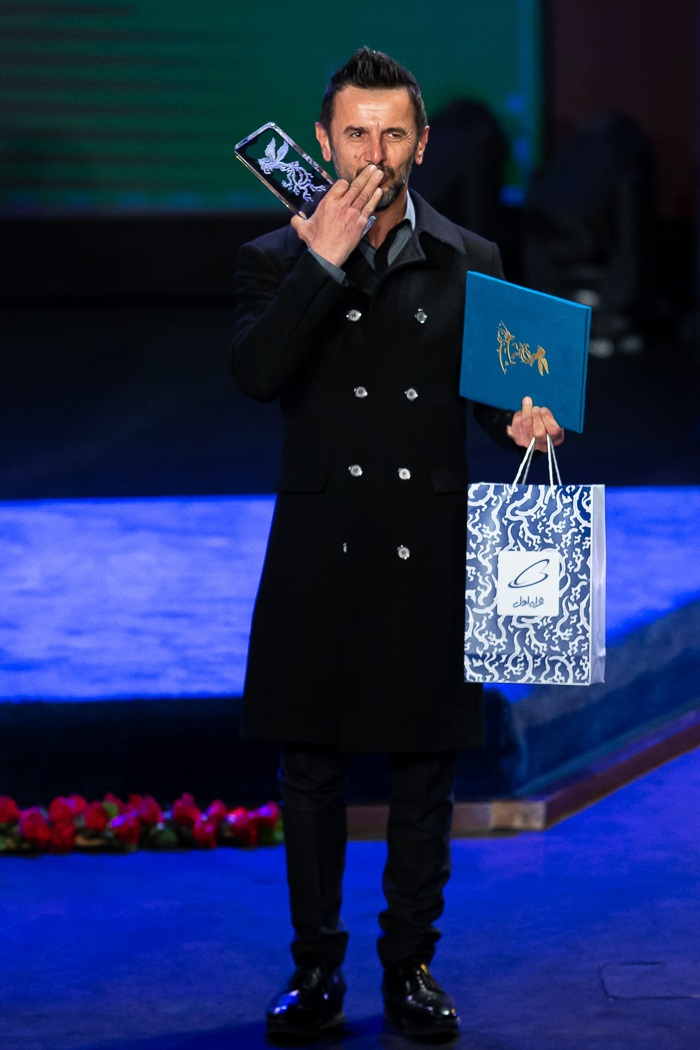
Amin Hayai, Best Actor winner

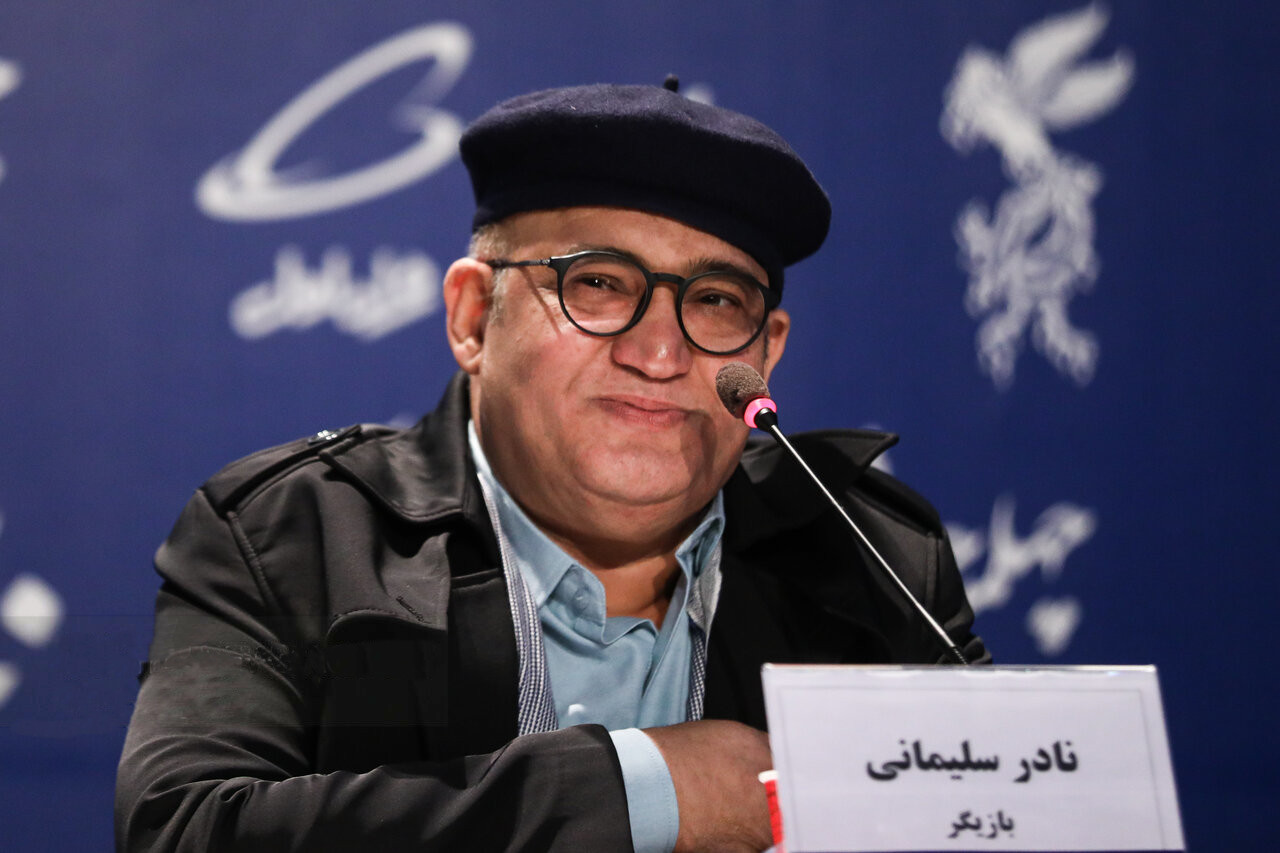
Nader Soleimani, Best Supporting Actor winner

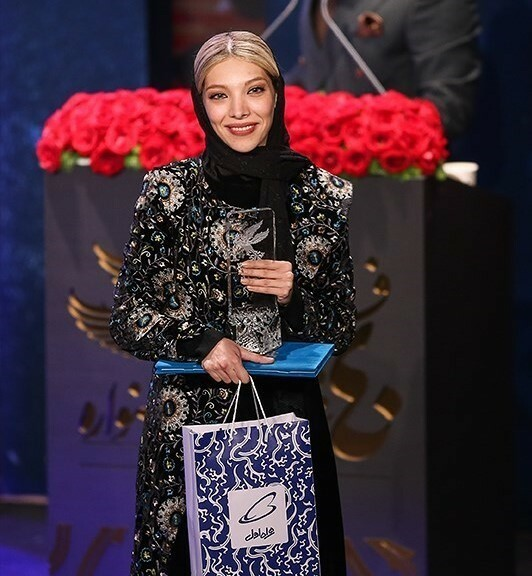
Sadaf Espahbodi, Best Supporting Actress winner

=== Main Competition ===
Best Director	Best Film
Reza Mirkarimi – The Night Guardian; Hadi Hejazifar – The Situation of Mehdi; Kazem Daneshi – Grassland; Amir Hossein Asgari – The Last Snow; Behrouz Shoeibi – No Prior Appointment	The Situation of Mehdi; Grassland; The Last Snow; The Night Guardian
Best Actress	Best Actor
Tannaz Tabatabaei – Without Her as Roya; Sara Bahrami – Grassland as Sara; Zhila Shahi – The Situation of Mehdi as Safieh Modares; Laleh Marzban – The Night Guardian as Nasibeh; Ladan Mostofi – The Last Snow as Rana	Amin Hayai – The Last Snow as Yousef; Pejman Jamshidi – Grassland as Amir Hossein; Touraj Alvand – The Night Guardian as Rasool; Mehdi Nosrati – The Opposition as Saeed
Best Supporting Actress	Best Supporting Actor
Sadaf Espahbodi – Grassland as Fariba; Fereshteh Hosseini – Squad of Girls (Honorary Diploma) as Simin; Shadi Karamroudi – Without Her as Ziba; Linda Kiani – The Opposition as Manijeh; Safoora Khoshtinat – The Night Guardian as; Nooshin Masoudian – The Last Snow as	Nader Soleimani – The Opposition as Naser; Aliakbar Osanloo – The Night Guardian (Honorary Diploma) as; Majid Salehi – The Last Snow as Khalil; Rouhollah Zamani – The Situation of Mehdi as Khosrow; Mehdi Zaminpardaz – Grassland as Mohsen; Payam Ahmadinia – Conjugal Visit as
Best Cinematography	Best Screenplay
Arman Fayaz – The Last Snow; Vahid Ebrahimi – The Situation of Mehdi; Alireza Barazandeh – The Town; Hadi Behrouz – Grassland; Mohammad Hadadi – No Prior Appointment	Kazem Daneshi – Grassland; Ebrahim Amini, Hadi Hejazifar – The Situation of Mehdi; Farhad Tohidi, Mehdi Torab Beigi – No Prior Appointment; Amir Hossein Asgari, Amir Mohammad Abdi, Seyyed Hassan Hosseini – The Last Snow; Reza Mirkarimi, Mohammad Davoudi – The Night Guardian
Best Original Score	Best Editor
Massoud Sekhavatdoost – The Situation of Mehdi; Behzad Abdi – Grassland (Honorary Diploma); Habib Khazaeifar – The Loser Man; Fardin Khalatbari – Mahan; Fardin Khalatbari – Henas	Hamid Najafirad – Grassland; Sepideh Abdel Wahab – Killing a Traitor; Hamid Najafirad – Squad of Girls; Zhila Ipkechi – The Town; Hossein Jamshidi Gohari – The Situation of Mehdi
Best Sound Effects	Best Sound Recording
Alireza Alavian – Grassland, No Prior Appointment; Faramarz Abolsedgh – Squad of Girls; Amin Sharifi – The Opposition; Amir Hossein Ghasemi – Killing a Traitor, The Night Guardian; Naeem Maschian – 2888	Massih Hadpour Seraj –The Situation of Mehdi; Mehdi Ebrahimzadeh – Squad of Girls; Abbas Rastegarpour – No Prior Appointment; Amir Nobakht Haghighi – Golden Night; Babak Ardalan – The Late Father
Best Production Design	Best Costume Design
Mohammad Reza Shojai – The Opposition; Soheil Danesh Eshraghi – Killing a Traitor; Amir Zagheri – The Situation of Mehdi; Mohammad Reza Shojai – Squad of Girls; Aidin Zarif – 2888; Ali Nasirinia – The Last Snow	Maral Jeyrani – Killing a Traitor; Behzad Aghabeigi – The Situation of Mehdi; Fatemeh Safarizadeh – The Late Father; Zahra Samadi – The Night Guardian; Ali Nasirinia – The Last Snow
Best Special Effects	Best Makeup
Iman Karamian – The Situation of Mehdi; Arash Aghabeig – Killing a Traitor; Arash Aghabeig – The Town; Hamid Rasoulian – The Opposition; Mohsen Roozbahani, Kavoos Roozbahani – Squad of Girls	Omid Golzadeh – The Last Snow, The Late Father; Mona Jafari – Grassland; Shahram Khalaj – The Situation of Mehdi; Azim Farayn – Beyro; Morteza Kahzadi – The Opposition
Best Documentary	Best Visual Effects
Lamentation; Persian Elementary School; Soldier N.0	Hassan Najafi, Amir Valikhani – Squad of Girls; Mohammad Baradaran – Killing a Traitor; Amin Pahlavanzadeh – The Loser Man; Kamyar Shafiepour – The Last Snow; Farid Nazerfasihi – Beyro
Special Jury Prize	Best National Film
Amir Hassan Asgari – The Last Snow; Seyed Hadi Mohaghegh – Scent of the Wind (Honorary Diploma)	Behrouz Shoeibi – No Prior Appointment
Best Short Film
Bonus; Past; Longing

=== First Look ===
Best First Film
- The Situation of Mehdi
  - Without Her
  - Grassland
  - Conjugal Visit

=== Advertising Competition ===
Best Poster Design	Best Still Photography
No Simorgh given: Ehsan Barabadi – Old Men Never Die (Honorary Diploma); Erfan Behkar – The Badger; Mohammad Taghi Pour – Mansour	Habib Majidi – Mansour; Omid Saleh – Atabai; Fattah Zinouri – Under Low Light
Best Trailer
Omid Mirzae – Staging, The Sniper; Rouhollah Moahedi – Siah Baz; Kiomars Beykzand – Without Everything

=== Films with multiple wins ===
Wins	Films
5	The Situation of Mehdi
4	The Last Snow
4	Grassland
2	The Night Guardian
2	Squad of Girls
2	No Prior Appointment
2	The Opposition

=== Films with multiple nominations ===
Nominations	Films
14	The Situation of Mehdi
13	Grassland
12	The Last Snow
9	The Night Guardian
7	Squad of Girls
7	The Opposition
6	Killing a Traitor
5	No Prior Appointment
3	The Late Father
3	Without Her
3	The Town
2	The Loser Man
2	Conjugal Visit
2	Beyro
2	2888

== Films ==
=== Main Competition ===
Title	Director
2888	Keyvan Alimohammadi, Ali Akbar Heydari
No Prior Appointment	Behrouz Shoeibi
The Last Snow	Amir Hossein Asgari
Without Her	Arian Vazirdaftari
Motherless	Morteza Fatemi
Beyro	Morteza Aliabbas Mirzaei
Killing a Traitor	Masoud Kimiai
Scent of the Wind	Seyyed Hadi Mohaghegh
Squad of Girls	Monir Gheidi
The Late Father	Hossein Namazi
Golden Night	Yousef Hatamikia
The Town	Ali Hazrati
Henas	Hossein Darabi
The Opposition	Amir Abbas Rabiei
Grassland	Kazem Daneshi
Layers of Lies	Ramin Sohrab
Mahan	Hamid Shahhatami
The Loser Man	Mohammad Hossein Mahdavian
Conjugal Visit	Omid Shams
The Situation of Mehdi	Hadi Hejazifar
The Night Guardian	Reza Mirkarimi
Linden	Davoud Bidel

=== Documentary ===
Title	Director
The Man Came by Bus	Nima Mahdian
Lamentation	Hojat Taheri
My Brother's Gun	Kamran Jahedi
Persian Elementary School	Hassan Naghashi
Soldier N.0	Mohammad Salimi Rad
Tonight's Homework	Ashkan Nejati, Mehran Nematollahi
Nobody is Waiting for You	Mohsen Eslamzadeh
One of My Dreams	Mohsen Hadi

=== Short film ===
Title	Director
Gazelle	Mahsa Razavi
Bonus	Reza Nejati
Coffin	Akbar Zare'e
Past	Hamid Mohammadi
Deer	Hadi Babaeifar
Leo	Mohammadmoein Roujollamini
Majan	Fardin Ansari
Hajrou	Afshin Akhlaghi Feyzasar
Longing	Houra Tabatabaei
All The Time	Shadi Karamroudi
