= The Night Guardian =

- Film poster
- Directed by: Reza Mirkarimi
- Written by: Reza Mirkarimi; Mohammad Davoudi
- Produced by: Reza Mirkarimi
- Starring: Touraj Alvand; Laleh Marzban; Aliakbar Osanloo; Safoura Khoshtinat; Mohsen Kiaee
- Cinematography: Morteza Hedayati
- Edited by: Reza Mirkarimi
- Distributed by: Banoo Film
- Release date: February 1, 2022 (FIFF)
- Country: Iran
- Language: Persian

The Night Guardian (Persian: نگهبان شب, romanized: Negahban-e Shab) is a 2022 Iranian drama film directed and produced by Reza Mirkarimi and written by Mirkarimi and Mohammad Davoudi. The film screened for the first time at the 40th Fajr Film Festival and received 9 nominations, where Mirkarimi won the award for Best Director and Aliakbar Osanloo received an Honorary Diploma for his acting. It was selected as the Iranian entry for the Best International Feature Film at the 96th Academy Awards.

== Premise ==
The film is about a naive young village boy named Rasool (Touraj Alvand) whose quiet and carefree life is challenged by the trusting Behnam (Mohsen Kiaee), who is the engineer of a construction project.

== Cast ==
- Touraj Alvand as Rasool
- Laleh Marzban as Nasibeh
- Aliakbar Osanloo
- Safoura Khoshtinat
- Mohsen Kiaee as Behnam
- Vishka Asayesh
- Kiumars Pourahmad
- Fahimeh Hormozi
- Zahra Eslami
- Parham Gholamlou
- Mohammad Sadegh Malek
- Ali Ghabeshi
- Mehrad Akbarabadi
- Iman Salgi
- Navid Bani

== Reception ==
=== Accolades ===
Year	Award	Category	Recipient	Result	Ref.
2022	Fajr Film Festival	Best Film	Reza Mirkarimi	Nominated	
2022	Fajr Film Festival	Best Director	Reza Mirkarimi	Won	
2022	Fajr Film Festival	Best Screenplay	Reza Mirkarimi and Mohammad Davoudi	Nominated	
2022	Fajr Film Festival	Best Actor	Touraj Alvand	Nominated	
2022	Fajr Film Festival	Best Actress	Laleh Marzban	Nominated	
2022	Fajr Film Festival	Best Supporting Actor	Aliakbar Osanloo	Honorary Diploma	
2022	Fajr Film Festival	Best Supporting Actress	Safoora Khoshtinat	Nominated	
2022	Fajr Film Festival	Best Sound Effects	Amirhossein Ghasemi	Nominated	
2022	Fajr Film Festival	Best Costume Design	Zahra Samadi	Nominated	

== See also ==
- List of submissions to the 96th Academy Awards for Best International Feature Film
- List of Iranian submissions for the Academy Award for Best International Feature Film
