= Squad of Girls =

2022 Iranian film

- Film poster
- Directed by: Monir Gheidi
- Written by: Monir Gheidi; Milad Akbarnejad; Ebrahim Amini
- Produced by: Mohammadreza Mansouri
- Starring: Niki Karimi; Pantea Panahiha; Fereshteh Hosseini; Hoda Zeinolabedin; Sadaf Asgari
- Cinematography: Saman Lotfian
- Edited by: Hamid Najafirad
- Music by: Sattar Oraki
- Production companies: Farabi Cinema Foundation; Soureh Cinema Foundation
- Release date: February 1, 2022 (FIFF)
- Country: Iran
- Language: Persian

Squad of Girls (Persian: دسته دختران, romanized: Dasteye Dokhtarân) is a 2022 Iranian war drama film directed by Monir Gheidi and written by Gheidi, Milad Akbarnejad and Ebrahim Amini. it revolves around the Battle of Khorramshahr of 1980. The film screened for the first time at the 40th Fajr Film Festival where it won an award, an honorary diploma and earned 5 nominations.

== Premise ==
the movie shows the resistance and self-sacrifice of women in the early days of the war, and by reconstructing live and documentary images of the house-to-house battle in Khorramshahr, has created the first cinematic image of that resistance from a female perspective.

== Cast ==
- Niki Karimi as Yeganeh Kamayi
- Pantea Panahiha as Vajihe
- Fereshteh Hosseini as Simin
- Hoda Zeinolabedin as Fereshteh
- Sadaf Asgari as Azar
- Hossein Soleimani as Soldier
- Mehdi Hosseininia as Vajihe's Husband
- Yasin Masoudi
- Mohammad Sadigi Mehr

== Reception ==
=== Critical response ===
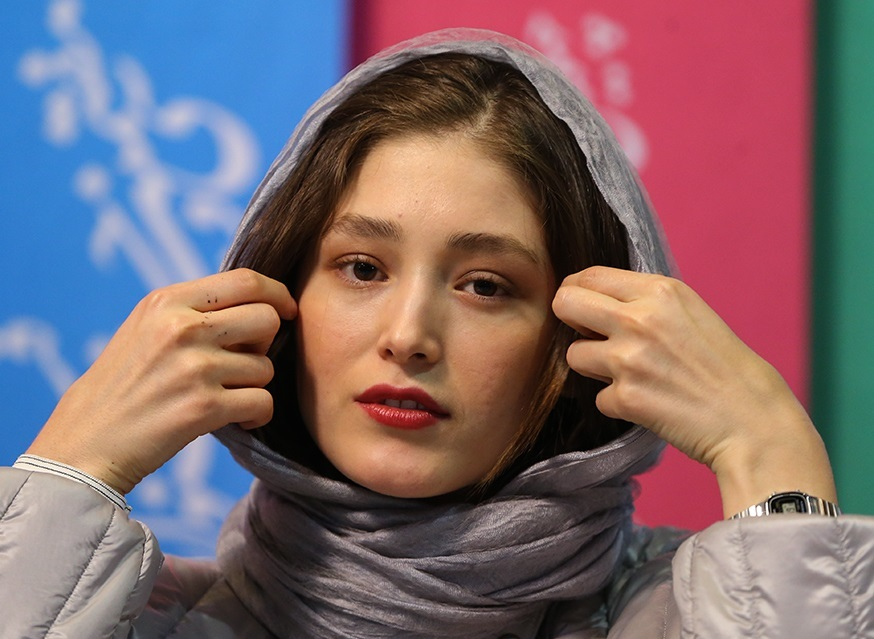
Fereshteh Hosseini's performance as Simin garnered widespread critical acclaim and earned her a Diploma Honorary for Best Supporting Actress.

=== Accolades ===
Year	Award	Category	Recipient	Result	Ref.
2022	Fajr Film Festival	Best Supporting Actress	Fereshteh Hosseini	Honorary Diploma	
2022	Fajr Film Festival	Best Visual Effects	Hassan Najafi and Amir Valikhani	Won	
2022	Fajr Film Festival	Best Special Effects	Mohsen Roozbahani and Kavoos Roozbahani	Nominated	
2022	Fajr Film Festival	Best Production Design	Mohammad Reza Shojai	Nominated	
2022	Fajr Film Festival	Best Sound Effects	Faramarz Abolsedgh	Nominated	
2022	Fajr Film Festival	Best Sound Recording	Mehdi Ebrahimzadeh	Nominated	
2022	Fajr Film Festival	Best Editor	Hamid Najafirad	Nominated	
2022	Urban International Film Festival	Best Actress	Pantea Panahiha	Nominated	
2022	Urban International Film Festival	Best Special and Visual Effects	Hassan Najafi, Amir Valikhani, Mohsen Roozbahani and Kavoos Roozbahani	Nominated	
