= Ladan Mostofi =

Iranian actress (born 1972)

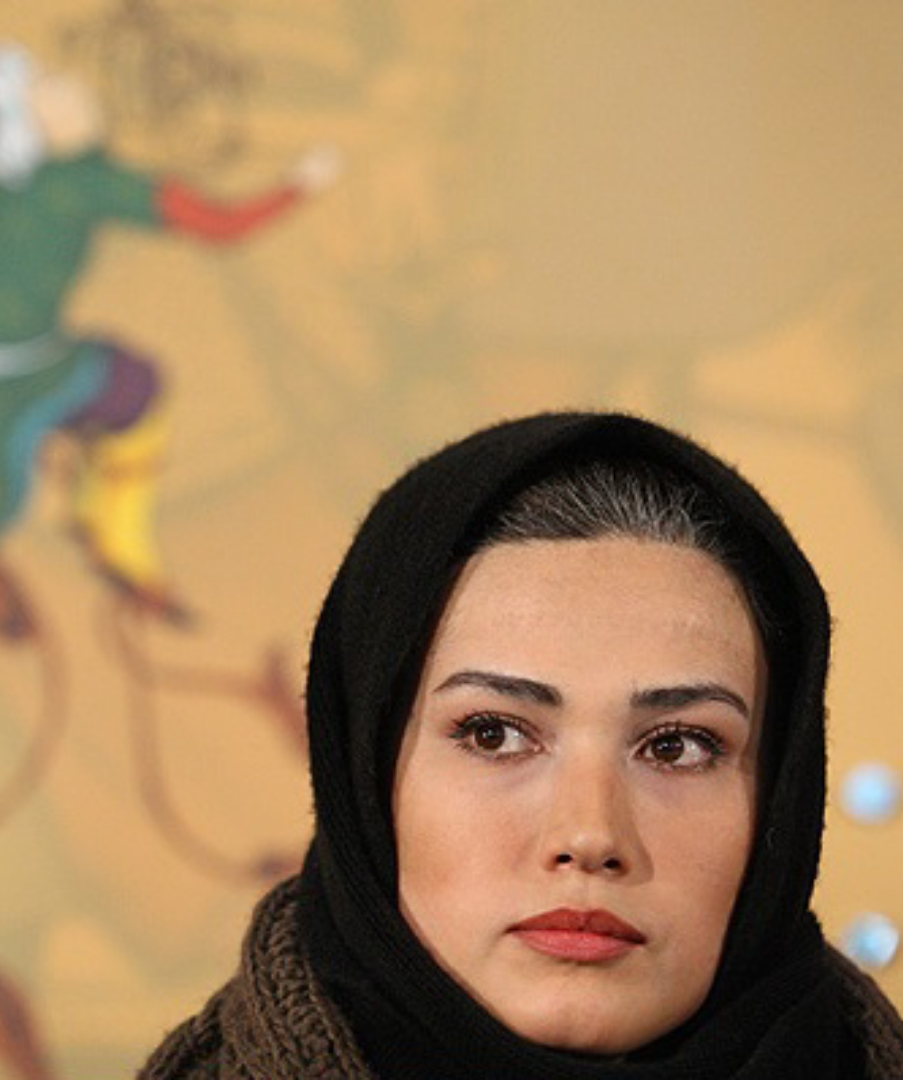
- Mostofi at the 2008 Fajr International Film Festival
- Born: Zahra Mostofi; November 17, 1972 (age 53); Tonekabon, Mazandaran, Iran
- Occupation: Actress
- Years active: 1994–present
- Spouse: Shahram Asadi (m. 1994; div. 2016)

Ladan Mostofi (Persian: لادن مستوفی; born November 17, 1972) is an Iranian actress. She has received various accolades, including nominations for four Crystal Simorghs, two Hafez Awards and an Iran Cinema Celebration Awards. She won the Best Actress Award at the 3rd Eurasia International Film Festival for Goodnight Commander (2006).

== Filmography ==
=== Film ===
Year	Title	Role	Director	Notes	Ref(s)
1995	The Fateful Day		Shahram Asadi		
1996	The Moon and the Sun		Mohammad Hossein Haghighi		
1997	Storm		Mohammad Bozorgnia		
2000	A Girl Named Tondar	Tondar	Hamid Reza Ashtianipour		
2002	Look at Me		Shahram Asadi		
2003	The Time of Harvesting the Walnuts		Iraj Emami		
2004	Tara and the Strawberry Fever		Saeed Soheili		
2004	It's Sunset, Come		Ensieh Shah Hosseini		
2006	Goodbye Commander	Maryam	Ensieh Shah Hosseini	Won – Eurasia International Film Festival Award for Best Actress	
2006	5PM Ferdous Park	Darya	Siamak Shayeghi		
2008	The Night of the Incident		Shahram Asadi		
2008	Winter Dreams	Farzaneh	Siamak Shayeghi		
2008	Hustler	Nazanin	Alireza Davoudnezhad		
2008	Shirin	Woman in audience	Abbas Kiarostami		
2009	Whatever You Want	Roya	Mohammad Motevaselani		
2010	Pay Back		Tahmineh Milani	Nominated – Crystal Simorgh Fajr Film Festival Award for Best Actress	
2010	A Very Close Encounter	Nahid	Esmail Mihandoost		
2011	Mr. Yousef	Shirin	Ali Rafi'i		
2011	The Eye	Joan	Jamil Rostami		
2011	Golchehreh	Rokhsareh	Vahid Mousaian	Nominated – Crystal Simorgh Fajr Film Festival Award for Best Actress	
2011	Lifeline		Mohammad Ebrahim Moayeri		
2015	Obesity	Bahar	Rama Ghavidel		
2015	Moon in the Forest		Siamak Shayeghi		
2016	A Romantic Robbery	Essi	Amir Shahab Razavian		
2016	The Time I Came Back	Homa	Vahid Mousaeean		
2017	Temporary Licence		Afshin Hashemi		
2018	Forty Seven	Katy	Alireza Ataallahetabrizi, Ahmad Otraghchi		
2019	White Fish Season	Nahid	Ghorban Najafi		
2020	Dead Eater		Sadegh Sadegh Daghighi		
2021	Sahel's Dream		Arash Sajjadi Hosseini		
2022	The Last Snow	Rana	Amir Hossein Asgari	Nominated – Crystal Simorgh Fajr Film Festival Award for Best Actress	
2023	Seven Citrus Aurantium		Farshad Golsefidi		
2024	Paradise of Criminals		Masoud Jafari Jozani	Nominated – Crystal Simorgh Fajr Film Festival Award for Best Supporting Actress	

=== Web ===
Year	Title	Role	Director	Platform	Ref(s)
2020	Sleepless	Setareh	Sirous Moghaddam	Video CD	
2022	Lily's Turn		Rouhollah Hejazi	Namava	
2023–2024	Fereshteh's Sin	Mahtab Mohtasham	Hamed Angha	Filimo	

=== Television ===
Year	Title	Role	Director	Notes	Network	Ref(s)
2001	Disobedience Era		Kamal Tabrizi	TV series	IRIB TV5	
2002	The Green Journey	Anna	Mohammad Hossein Latifi	TV series	IRIB TV3	
2003	A House in the Dark		Saeed Soltani	TV series	IRIB TV3	
2007	Sheikh Bahaei		Shahram Asadi	TV series	IRIB TV2	
2014	Jalal al-Din		Shahram Asadi, Arash Moeirian	TV series	IRIB TV1	
2016	Paria	Paria	Hossein Soheilizadeh	TV series	IRIB TV3	
2016	Get Together	Herself	Mehran Modiri	TV program	IRIB Nasim	
2019	Khandevaneh	Herself	Rambod Javan	TV program	IRIB Nasim	
2022	Seven	Herself	Mojtaba Amini	TV program	IRIB TV3	

== See also ==
- Persian cinema
