= Without Her (2022 film) =

- Film poster
- Directed by: Arian Vazirdaftari
- Written by: Arian Vazirdaftari
- Produced by: Houman Seyyedi; Saeed Sadi
- Starring: Tannaz Tabatabaei; Saber Abar; Shadi Karamroudi
- Cinematography: Alireza Barazandeh
- Edited by: Mehdi Sadi
- Music by: Bamdad Afshar
- Production company: Fadak Film
- Distributed by: Picture Tree International
- Release dates: February 1, 2022 (Fajr); September 6, 2022 (Venice)
- Country: Iran
- Language: Persian

Without Her (Persian: بی رویا, romanized: Bi Roya, lit. Without Roya (Note: Roya, means Dream in Persian.)) is a 2022 Iranian drama mystery thriller film directed and written by Arian Vazirdaftari and produced by Houman Seyyedi and Saeed Sadi. The film screened for the first time at the 40th Fajr Film Festival where it won the Crystal Simorgh for Best Actress for Tannaz Tabatabaei and earned 2 other nominations, one of which was for Shadi Karamroudi as the best actress in the supporting role and the other one for the director Arian Vazirdaftari as the Best Debut Film prize nominee.

Without Her screened at the 79th Venice International Film Festival in the Horizons Extra section on September 6, 2022.

== Premise ==
Roya meets a girl named Ziba who has forgotten all of her past and she wants to help Ziba to find her family but after some days Roya starts to forget things about herself.

== Cast ==
- Tannaz Tabatabaei as Roya
- Shadi Karamroudi as Ziba
- Saber Abar as Babak
- Farank Kalantar
- Reza DavoudNejad
- Maedeh Tahmasebi
- Mojtaba Fallahi
- Nahal Dashti
- Mehri Al Agha
- Milad Yazdani
- Tiam Kermanian

== Reception ==
=== Critical response ===
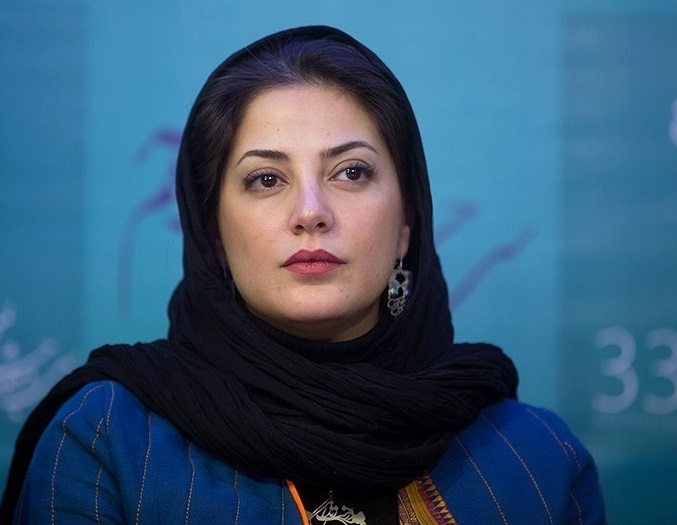
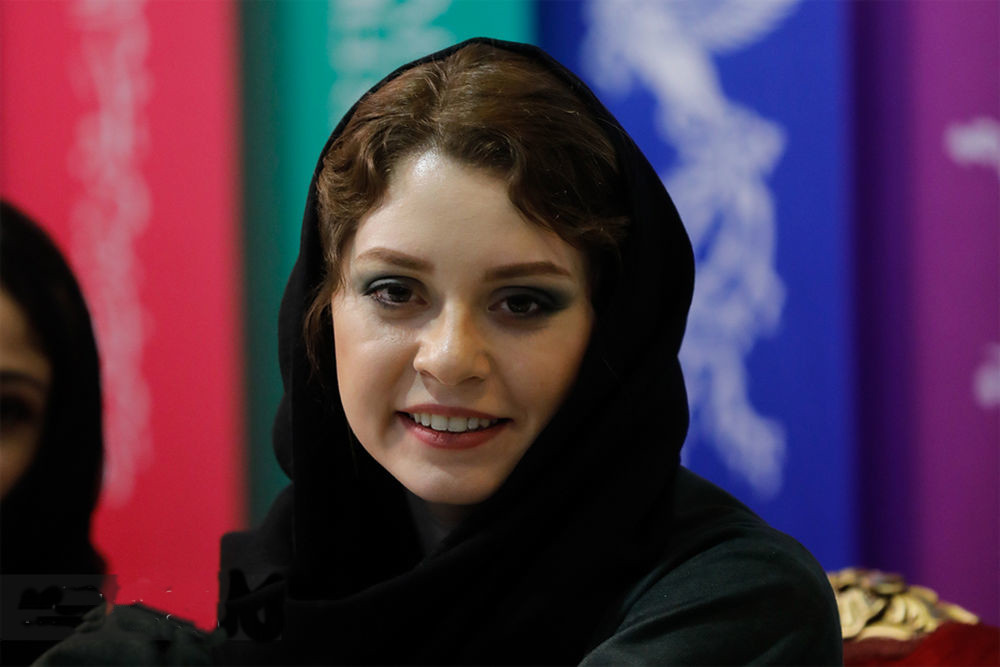
The performances of Tannaz Tabatabaei and Shadi Karamroudi garnered critical acclaim and both received Crystal Simorgh nominations for Best Actress and Best Supporting Actress, respectively, with Tabatabaei winning.

The film was selected as one of The 10 best Middle Eastern and North African films of 2022 by the Middle East Eye website. Moreover, the Australian critic Shane Danielsen called it "a smart, expertly crafted psychodrama" in his Venice Film Festival review in The Monthly, which reminds you of those great Eastern European films of the ’60s and ’70s, from people such as Hungary’s Miklós Jancsó and Czechoslovakia’s Jan Němec, using metaphor and allusion to condemn the communist regimes under which their makers lived and worked.

=== Accolades ===
Year	Award	Category	Recipient	Result	Ref.
2022	Fajr Film Festival	Best Actress	Tannaz Tabatabaei	Won	
2022	Fajr Film Festival	Best Supporting Actress	Shadi Karamroudi	Nominated	
2022	Fajr Film Festival	Best First Look Film	Arian Vazirdaftari	Nominated	
