= Damascus Time =

2018 Iranian drama film

- English poster of Damascus Time
- Directed by: Ebrahim Hatamikia
- Written by: Ebrahim Hatamikia
- Produced by: Mohammad Khazai
- Starring: Babak Hamidian; Hadi Hejazifar; Khaled El Sayed; Pierre Dagher; Laleh Marzban; Lath El Mofty
- Cinematography: Mehdi Jafari
- Edited by: Mehrdad Khoshbakht
- Music by: Karen Homayounfar
- Production company: Owj Arts and Media organization
- Distributed by: Filmiran (Iran)
- Release date: February 1, 2018 (FIFF)
- Running time: 109 min
- Country: Iran
- Languages: Persian; Arabic; English; Russian

Damascus Time (Persian: به وقت شام) is a 2018 drama film by Iranian director Ebrahim Hatamikia. The plot revolves around an Iranian pilot and his copilot son whose plane is seized by ISIS forces in Syria while carrying a cargo of humanitarian relief supplies to people in a war zone. Hadi Hejazifar, Babak Hamidian and an ensemble of Syrian, Iraqi and Lebanese actors star in the film.

== Synopsis ==
Haj Younes and his son, Ali, play pilots trying to rescue civilians besieged and attacked by ISIS forces in eastern Syria. The pilots have come to help the townspeople escape in an aging Ilyushin cargo plane.

== Cast ==
- Babak Hamidian
- Hadi Hejazifar
- Khaled El Sayed
- Pierre Dagher
- Laleh Marzban
- Mahdi Sheikh Isa
- Lath El Mofty
- Behzad Khalaj

== Release ==
The movie seeks to shed light on the reality of Daesh and what the Western media is trying to hide from the world about them. Hatamikia, Homayunfar and Joseph Salameh, the Lebanese actor who stars as Abu Omar al-Shishani in the film, attended the ceremony organized at the Kurosh Cineplex.

== Awards ==
At the 2018 Fajr International Film Festival, Ebrahim Hatamikia was co-awarded the Crystal Simorgh for best director. Mohammad-Ali Jafari, IRGC Chief-Commander, congratulated Hatamikia on receiving the Award. The movie won two other awards for Best Composer and Best Sound Effects, and holds the record of being nominated in eight categories.

== Reception ==
Mohammad Javad Zarif, Iranian Minister of Foreign Affairs, and Iran's Quds force commander, Qasem Soleimani described the movie as a "masterpiece."

Lead actor Hadi Hejazifar said that he was not satisfied with his performance in the movie. According to reports, the film is planned to premiere South Korea, Japan, Iraq, and Lebanon.
