= Colors of Memory =

- Screen captures
- Directed by: Amir Shahab Razavian
- Starring: Shahbaz Noshir, Ezatollah Entezami, Saber Abar, Reza Khamseh, Roya Javidnia, Mirja Mahir, Hilda Ranjbaran, Maryam Meschian, Mozhgan Rabbany
- Release date: March 14, 2008
- Running time: 102 minutes
- Country: Iran

Colors of Memory (In Persian: مینای شهر خاموش, transliteration of title: Minā-ye Shahr-e Khāmoush) is a 2008 Iranian film directed by Amir-Shahab Razavian, based on the events of the 2003 Bam earthquake. This film's original name is Minā-ye Shahr-e Khāmoush (مینای شهر خاموش), which may be translated as The Minā of the Silent Town.

== Cast ==
- Ezzatollah Entezami as Mr Ghanāti.
- Shahbāz Noushir as Doctor Pārsā.
- Sāber Abar as Iraj Bahrāmi, the chauffeur.
- Mehran Rajabi as Jebeli.
- Rezā Khamseh as an old man.
- Royā Jāvid'niā as doctor Dāvoudi.
- Mirjā Mahir as assistant to doctor Dāvoudi.

== Reception ==
The film was released at the Tiburon Film Festival on March 14, 2008. The film was praised by Canadian Online Explorer as "both celebratory and heartbreaking" and urged Iranians "to bring tissues."

== See also ==
- Bam 6.6
