= Amir Shahab Razavian =

Iranian film director (born 1965)

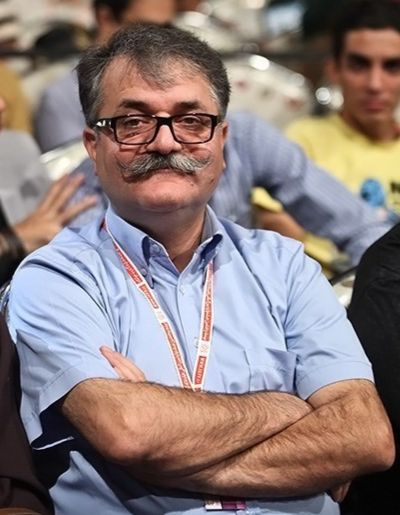
Amir Shahab Razavian - 2013

Amir Shahab Razavian (Persian: امیرشهاب رضویان; born 25 May 1965 in Hamadan, Iran) is an Iranian film director, filmmaker and producer.

Razavian began his cinematic activities at Hamedan Amateur Film-making Centre in 1980 while still studying at high school (at Ebn-e Sinā High School in Hamadan). He earned his film directing degree from College of Theatre and Cinema of Art University in 1990. From the same college, he received in 1995 his post-graduate degree in animation. Since then, he has produced seventy short films, directed thirty documentaries and short films, and three feature films. The latter is The Journey of the Grey Men (Safar-e Mardān-e Khākestari), Tehran, Seven O'clock in the Morning (Tehrān Sā'at-e Haft-e Sobh) and Colors of Memory (with the original title Minā-ye Shahr-e Khāmoush, The Minā of the Extinguished Town).

== Filmography ==
- The Journey of the Grey Men (Safar-e Mardān-e Khākestari - سفر مردان خاکستری)
- Tehran, Seven O'clock in the Morning (Tehrān Sā'at-e Haft-e Sobh - تهران ساعت هفت صبح)
- Colors of Memory (with the original title Minā-ye Shahr-e Khāmoush - مینای شهر خاموش, The Azure of the Extinguished Town)
- Granny & Summer (with the original title Tabestane Aziz - تابستان عزیز)
