= Sun Children =

2020 film

- Film poster
- Directed by: Majid Majidi
- Screenplay by: Majid Majidi; Nima Javidi
- Produced by: Majid Majidi; Amir Banan
- Starring: Rouhollah Zamani; Javad Ezzati; Shamila Shirzad; Ali Nassirian
- Cinematography: Hooman Behmanesh
- Edited by: Hassan Hassandoost
- Music by: Ramin Kousha
- Release dates: February 10, 2020 (FIFF); September 6, 2020 (Venice)
- Running time: 99 minutes
- Country: Iran
- Language: Persian

Sun Children (Persian: خورشید, romanized: Khoršid), also known as The Sun, is a 2020 Iranian drama film co-produced, co-written and directed by Majid Majidi. It was presented in competition at the 77th Venice International Film Festival, where child actor Rouhollah Zamani won the Marcello Mastroianni Award. It was selected as the Iranian entry for the Best International Feature Film at the 93rd Academy Awards, making the shortlist of fifteen films.

== Plot ==
12-year-old Ali and his three friends do small jobs and petty crimes to survive and support their families. In a timely turn of events, Ali is entrusted to find a hidden underground treasure. However, in order to gain access to the tunnel where the treasure is buried, Ali and his gang must first enroll at the near Sun School, a charitable institution that tries to educate street kids and child laborers.

== Cast ==
- Rouhollah Zamani as Ali
- Javad Ezzati as School Vice Principal
- Shamila Shirzad as Zahra
- Ali Nassirian as Hashem
- Abolfazl Shirzad as Abolfazl
- Seyyed Mohammad Mehdi Mousavi Fard as Mamad
- Mani Ghafouri as Reza
- Safar Mohammadi as School Janitor
- Ali Ghabeshi as School Principal
- Tannaz Tabatabaei as Ali's mother (cameo).

== Reception ==
=== Critical response ===
Overall, the film has received critical acclaim. On Rotten Tomatoes, the film holds an approval rating of 91% based on 23 reviews, with an average rating of 7.8/10. Metacritic, assigned the film a weighted average score of 70 out of 100, based on 10 critics, indicating "generally favorable reviews". Xan Brooks of The Guardian described it as "energetic and heartfelt." The film also received praise from Peter Debruge at Variety and Deborah Young of The Hollywood Reporter.

=== Accolades ===
Award	Date of ceremony	Category	Recipient(s)	Result	Ref(s)
Fajr Film Festival	11 February 2020	Best Film	Majid Majidi, Amir Banan	Won	
Fajr Film Festival	11 February 2020	Best Screenplay	Majid Majidi, Nima Javidi	Won	
Fajr Film Festival	11 February 2020	Best Set Design	Keyvan Moghaddam	Won	
Venice International Film Festival	12 September 2020	Marcello Mastroianni Award	Rouhollah Zamani	Won	
Venice International Film Festival	12 September 2020	Lanterna Magica Award	Majid Majidi	Won	
Miami International Film Festival	2021	Knight Marimbas Award	Majid Majidi	Nominated	
Munich Film Festival	2021	Best International Film	Majid Majidi	Nominated	
Moscow International Film Festival	2021	NETPAC Jury Prize	Majid Majidi	Nominated	
Fünf Seen Film Festival	2021	Audience Award	Majid Majidi	Nominated	
Asian Film Awards	8 October 2021	Best Editor	Hassan Hassandoost	Nominated	
Asian Film Awards	8 October 2021	Best Newcomer	Rouhollah Zamani	Nominated	
Iran's Film Critics and Writers Association	2022	Best Cinematography	Hooman Behmanesh	Nominated	

== See also ==
- List of submissions to the 93rd Academy Awards for Best International Feature Film
- List of Iranian submissions for the Academy Award for Best International Feature Film
