= Beloved Sky =

- Directed by: Dariush Mehrjui
- Written by: Dariush Mehrjui
- Produced by: Yahya Mansour Moayyed
- Cinematography: Farrokh Majidi
- Edited by: Hassan Hassandoost
- Release date: 2011
- Country: Iran
- Language: Persian

Beloved Sky (Persian: Aseman-e mahboob) is a 2011 film by the Iranian director Dariush Mehrjui. Mehrjui also wrote the script with Vahideh Mohammadi. The film was lensed by Farrokh Majidi, and starred Ali Mosaffa, Leila Hatami, Mani Haghighi, and Farideh Sepah Mansour in the principal roles. The film was shown at the 2011 Fajr International Film Festival, where Mehrjui won the Crystal Simorgh of Special Jury Prize.
