= To Stay Alive =

2002 film

To Stay Alive (Bemani)
- Directed by: Dariush Mehrjui
- Written by: Dariush Mehrjui; Vahidéa Mohammadi
- Produced by: Dariush Mehrjui
- Starring: Neda Aghaei
- Cinematography: Bahram Badakshani
- Edited by: Dariush Mehrjui
- Release date: 24 May 2002
- Running time: 95 minutes
- Country: Iran
- Language: Persian

To Stay Alive (Persian: بمانی, translit. Bemani, Romanized as Bemāni) is a 2002 Iranian drama film directed by Dariush Mehrjui. It was screened in the Un Certain Regard section at the 2002 Cannes Film Festival.

== Cast ==
- Neda Aghaei
- Masoumeh Bakhshi
- Shadi Heydari

== Reception ==
Variety wrote, "Bemani is an extreme film detailing extreme acts of desperation that, like Mohsen Makhmalbaf’s Kandahar, uses artistic license to make its point like a kick in the stomach."
