= Daughter (2016 film) =

- Film poster
- Directed by: Reza Mirkarimi
- Written by: Mehran Kashani
- Produced by: Reza Mirkarimi
- Starring: Farhad Aslani; Merila Zarei; Mahoor Alvand; Shahrokh Foroutanian; Newsha Modabber; Ghorban Nadjafi
- Cinematography: Hamid Khozouie Abyane
- Music by: Mohammad Reza Aligholi
- Distributed by: Dreamlab Films
- Release dates: 1 February 2016 (Fajr Film Festival); 28 June 2016
- Running time: 103 min.
- Country: Iran
- Language: Persian

Daughter (Persian: دختر) is a 2016 Iranian drama film directed by Reza Mirkarimi. It was screened in the Competition section at the Moscow International Film Festival 2016 and International Film Festival of India 2016. It won Golden Peacock (Best Film) at the 47th International Film Festival of India. and the Golden George Award for Best Film at the 38th Moscow International Film Festival. It was also the best film in the 15th Dhaka International Film Festival.

== Critical response ==
The story depicts the modern Iran, in which the call for freedom and independence among women is stronger than ever. It also highlights the sharp contrast of social behaviour between the developed cities, such as Tehran, and rural areas. While the movie includes several heartbreaking references to inequality of men and women, exploring the unhealthy relationship of family members with a feminist approach helps the audience to realise how much more the movie has to offer. The movie introduces the father of Setare as a stereotypical Iranian father, who is simultaneously kind and strict, the mother, a sentimental woman who has the role of explaining the father's harsh overprotectiveness of the daughter, and the daughter who is like a lioness in chains, craves freedom.
