= Reza Mirkarimi =

Iranian film writer and director (born 1967)

- رضا میرکریمی
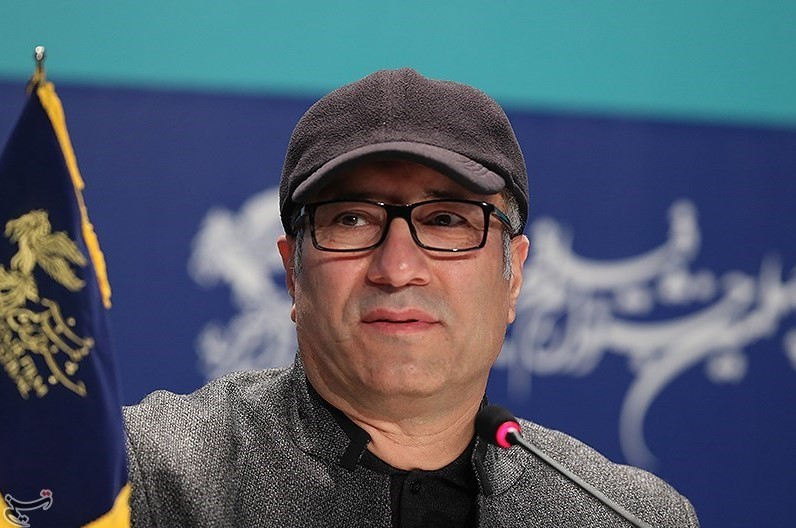
- Mirkarimi during the 2022 Fajr International Film Festival
- Born: January 28, 1967 (age 59); Tehran, Iran
- Years active: 2000–present
- Website: www.rezamirkarimi.com

Reza Mirkarimi (Persian: رضا میرکریمی; born 28 January 1967) is an Iranian screenwriter and film director.

== Early life ==
He graduated from Fine Arts University in graphic arts in Tehran.

== Career ==
His cinema activities started from 1987 with a short film named For Him (16mm camera) and with a series of shorts followed by two TV series aimed at young people.

His first feature film, The Child and The Soldier (1999), won several national and international awards, including the "Golden Butterfly" in 1999 at the Isfahan International Children and Youth Film Festival, Iran and the "Montgolfiere d'Argent” in 2000 at the Festival of 3 Continents, Nantes, France, and the "Golden Shoe" in 2001 at the "Children and Teenagers Film Festival" in Zelin, Croatia. The Child and The Soldier, was released in France in 2001. His second feature, Under the Moonlight (2000), dealing with social and religious issues won the Best Feature Award at the 40th Critics' Week in 2001 at the Cannes International Film Festival. The film also won the Best Director's Award as well as the Special Jury Prize at the Tokyo IFF in 2001, and the Golden Peacock Award at the International Film Festival of India. His fourth and fifth feature films, As Simple as That (2007) and Daughter (2016), won the Golden George Award for the Best Picture at the 30th and the 38th Moscow International Film Festival respectively. His film, Castle of Dreams (2019), won at Shanghai International Film Festival, receiving three awards for the best picture, the best director, and the best actor.

Mirkarimi has won seven Golden Simorgh awards at the Fajr International Film Festival and three of his films, So Close, So Far, A Cube of Sugar, and Today, have been presented by Iran for the Best Foreign Language Film Oscar.

He has also sat on several international film festival juries, including Black Nights Film Festival (Estonia), Tokyo International Film Festival (Japan), Carthage Film Festival (Tunisia), Bogota International Film Festival (Colombia), Golden Apricot – Yerevan International Film Festival (Armenia), and as jury president at the 39th Moscow International Film Festival.

Mirkarimi has collaborated with upcoming Iranian directors by producing their films. He produced Don't be Tired in 2012 and Voice of Silence in 2013.

He has also served as managing director of Khane-ye Cinema (Iranian Alliance of Motion Picture Guilds).

Reza Mirkarimi has been director of Fajr International Film Festival for four consecutive years from 2016 to 2019.

He was also Secretary of the International Film Festival of the Fajr Film Festival.

== Filmography ==
Year	Name	Transliteration	Award
2000	The Child And The Soldier	Koodak va Sarbaz	Nominated Grand Prix des Amériques Montréal World Film Festival 2000; Silver Montgolfiere Three Continents Festival 2000; Special Mention Three Continents Festival 2000; Young Audience Award Three Continents Festival 2000; Honor Diploma for Best Director Fajr International Film Festival 2000; Silver Balloon Three Continents Festival 2000; Golden Shoe Zlín Film Festival 2001
2001	Under The Moonlight	Zir-e Noor-e Maah	International Jury Award São Paulo International Film Festival 2001; Best Director Award tied with Gjergj Xhuvani for Slogans Tokyo International Film Festival 2001; Special Jury Prize Beirut International Film Festival 2001; Special Jury Prize Tokyo International Film Festival 2001; Special Jury Award Fajr International Film Festival 2001; Critics Week Grand Prize Cannes Film Festival 2001; Silver Peacock Special Prize of Jury Delhi International Film Festival 2002
2002	Here Is A Shining Light	Inja Cheraghi Roshan Ast	Best Screenplay Asia-Pacific Film Festival 2002; Crystal Simorgh Best Director Fajr International Film Festival 2003; Special Jury Prize Bali International Film Festival 2004
2005	So Close, So Far	Kheili Dour, Kheili Nazdik	Crystal Simorgh National Competition - Best Film Fajr International Film Festival 2005; Best Film Award House of Cinema 2005
2008	As Simple as That	Be Hamin Sadegi	Golden St. George 30th Moscow International Film Festival 2008; Russian Guild of Film Critics Award, International Competition Moscow International Film Festival 2008; Crystal Simorgh Competition of Asian Cinema - Best Screenplay with Shadmehr Rastin Fajr International Film Festival 2008; Crystal Simorgh Competition of Asian Cinema - Best Director Fajr International Film Festival 2008
2011	A Cube of Sugar	Yek Habe Ghand	Special Jury Prize Kazan International Festival of Muslim Cinema 2012; Best Film Ibn Arabi International Film Festival 2012; Best Film Kazan International Festival of Muslim Cinema 2013
2014	Today	Emrooz	Best Film Award Rabat International Film Festival 2014; Ecumenical Jury Prize Tallinn Black Nights Film Festival 2015; FIPRESCI Prize Tallinn Black Nights Film Festival 2015; Audience Award and Bronze Alhambra Cines del Sur 2015; Spirituality Section Award Dhaka International Film Festival 2016
2016	Daughter	Dokhtar	Crystal Simorgh National Competition - Best Original Score Fajr International Film Festival 2016; Golden St. George for Best Film Moscow International Film Festival 2016; Russian Film Clubs Federation Award for Best Film 2016; Nominated Crystal Simorgh for Best Film and Best Director Fajr International Film Festival 2016 Golden Peacock Award for the Best Film International Film Festival of India 2016
2019	Castle of Dreams	Ghasr-e Shirin	Golden Goblet Award for Best Feature Film Shanghai International Film Festival 2019; Golden Goblet Award for Best Director Shanghai International Film Festival 2019; Best Director International Antalya Film Festival 2019
2022	The Night Guardian	Negahban-e Shab	Crystal Simorgh National Competition - Best Director 40th Fajr Film Festival 2022

=== Short film ===
- Baraye Ou (For Him) - 1987.
- Yek Rooze Barani (A Rainy Day) - 1987.
- Khoroos (Rooster) - 1987.

=== Documentary ===
- Iranian Carpet - 2006.

=== TV series ===
- Majara-haye Aftaab va Aziz Khanoom (The Tales of Aftaab and Lady Aziz) - 1996.
- Bache-haye Madreseye Hemmat (Hemmat School Kids) - 1997.

== Accolades ==
In 2021 he was selected as Jury Chairman for Kim Jiseok Award in 26th Busan International Film Festival to be held in October.

=== Awards ===
- 2019 - Golden Goblet Award for Best Feature Film Shanghai International Film Festival.
- 2019 - Golden Goblet Award for Best Director Shanghai International Film Festival.
- 2019 - Best Director Antalya Golden Orange Film Festival.

== See also ==
- Iranian cinema
