= Crystal Simorgh =

- Sponsored by: Ministry of Culture and Islamic Guidance
- Location: Tehran
- Country: Iran
- Presented by: Fajr International Film Festival
- First award: 1983

The Crystal Simorgh (Persian: ‌سیمرغ بلورین) is an award given by Fajr International Film Festival, Iran's major annual film festival. It is awarded in several categories of International Competition as well as Iranian Cinema Competition. The award's name comes from the Simurgh, a mythical bird that appears in Persian mythology.

The Crystal Simorgh is one of the highest film honours in Iran.

== Categories ==
- Crystal Simorgh for Best Film
- Crystal Simorgh for Best Director
- Crystal Simorgh for Best Screenplay
- Crystal Simorgh for Best Actor
- Crystal Simorgh for Best Actress
- Crystal Simorgh for Best Cinematography
- Crystal Simorgh for Best Editor
- Crystal Simorgh for Best Original Score
- Crystal Simorgh for Best Makeup
- Crystal Simorgh for Best Supporting Actor
- Crystal Simorgh for Best Supporting Actress
- Crystal Simorgh for Best Sound Recording
- Crystal Simorgh for Best Sound Effects
- Crystal Simorgh for Best Production Design
- Crystal Simorgh for Best Costume Design
- Crystal Simorgh for Best Special Effects
- Crystal Simorgh for Best Visual Effects
- Crystal Simorgh for Best National Film
- Special Jury Award (Fajr International Film Festival)
- Crystal Simorgh for Audience Choice of Best Film

== See also ==
- Simurgh
- Category:Crystal Simorgh winners
