= 16th Fajr International Film Festival =

Film festival in Iran

- Official poster
- Opening film: The Glass Agency
- Location: Tehran, Iran
- Founded: 1983
- Awards: Crystal Simorgh
- Editor-in-chief: Seifollah Dad
- Festival date: 1–11 February 1998
- Language: Persian, English

Fajr International Film Festival
- 17th 15th

The 16th Fajr International Film Festival (Persian: شانزدهمین جشنواره بین‌المللی فیلم فجر) held 1–11 February 1998 in Tehran, Iran.

The Glass Agency (Ebrahim Hatamikia, 1998) was the festival's best film in "Competition of Iranian Cinema" and The Promise (Luc Dardenne and Jean-Pierre Dardenne, 1996) —a Belgian film— was the festival's best film in "Competition of International Cinema".

The Glass Agency won a record-tying nine awards including Best Film, Best Director and Best Screenplay.

== Selection committee ==
Majid Nadiri, festival's public relations officer, was announced the selection committee members on 3 January as below:

- Parvaneh Massoumi, actress
- Mohammad-Reza Honarmand, director
- Manouchehr Asgarinasab, director
- Zia Hashemi, producer
- Abdollah Esfandiari, producer

== Juries ==
Competition of Iranian Cinema

- Ezatollah Entezami, Actor
- Kiumars Pourahmad, director
- Ahmad-Reza Darvish, director
- Fereshteh Taerpour, producer
- Majid Majidi, director

Competition of International Cinema

- Abbas Kiarostami, Iranian director
- Marco Mueller, Italian producer
- Jean-Michel Frodon, French film critic
- Tadao Sato, Japanese film critic
- Sandip Ray, Indian director

== Competition of Iranian Cinema ==
Closing ceremony of the 16th Fajr International Film Festival
- Date: 11 February 1998
- Site: Vahdat Hall

Highlights
- Best Film: The Glass Agency
- Most awards: The Glass Agency (8)
- Most nominations: The Glass Agency (13) (Note: The Glass Agency had had two nomination for Best Supporting Actor category.)

Awards and nominations of the Competition of Iranian Cinema sections are below:

Audience Choice

Best Film
- The Glass Agency – Varahonar and Farabi Cinema Foundation, producers‡

Competition

Best Film: The Glass Agency – Varahonar and Farabi Cinema Foundation, producers‡; The Tree of Life – Mohammadreza Sarhangi and IRIB TV2, producers† (Note: Honorary Diploma winner); The Pear Tree – Dariush Mehrjui, Faramarz Farazmand and Farabi Cinema Foundation, producers; The May Lady – Alireza Raisian and Jahangir Kosari, producers; Birth of A Butterfly – SimaFilm, producer	Best Director: Ebrahim Hatamikia – The Glass Agency‡; Farhad Mehranfar – The Tree of Life†; Dariush Mehrjui – The Pear Tree; Rakhshan Bani-Etemad – The May Lady; Mojtaba Ra'i – Birth of A Butterfly
Best Actor: Parviz Parastui – The Glass Agency‡; Amir Payvar – The Cloud and the Rising Sun†; Mohammad-Reza Foroutan – Mercedes	Best Actress: Anis Shakouri – The Tree of Life‡; Minoo Farshchi – The May Lady; Niki Karimi – Psycho; Fatemeh Motamed-Arya – Life; Vishka Asayesh – The Sorcerer
Best Supporting Actor: Reza Kianian – The Glass Agency‡; Habib Rezaei – The Glass Agency†; Jahangir Almasi – The Lost Love	Best Supporting Actress: Bita Baderan – The Glass Agency‡; Golab Adineh – The May Lady; Fahimeh Rastkar – Psycho
Best Screenplay: The Glass Agency – Ebrahim Hatamikia‡; Takhti: The World Champion – Behrouz Afkhami; The Tree of Life – Farhad Mehranfar; Birth of A Butterfly – Saeid Shapouri	Best Cinematography: Birth of A Butterfly – Mohammad Davoudi‡; The Glass Agency – Aziz Saati; The May Lady – Hossein Jafarian; The Tree of Life – Nader Masoumi
Best Film Editing: The Glass Agency – Hayedeh Safiyari‡; The Pear Tree – Mostafa Kherghehpoosh; Birth of A Butterfly – Hassan Hassandoust; Takhti: The World Champion – Hassan Hassandoust; The Sorcerer – Mehrzad Minooei and Mohammadreza Muini	Best Score: The Glass Agency – Majid Entezami‡; The Cloud and the Rising Sun – Hossein Alizadeh; Birth of A Butterfly – Kambiz Roshanravan; Mercedes – Babak Bayat
Best Sound Mixing: Birth of A Butterfly – Mohammad-Reza Delpak‡; The Glass Agency – Mohsen Roshan; The May Lady – Parviz Abnar; The Tree of Life – Abbas Rastgarpour	Best Sound Recording: The Tree of Life – Abbas Rastgarpour‡; Mercedes – Eshagh Khanzadi; A Mother's Love – Yadollah Najafi
Best Costume Design: The May Lady – Amir Esbati‡; The Glass Agency – Hamidreza Charakchian; The Tree of Life – Soheila Hashemi	Best Makeup: The Sorcerer – Abdollah Eskandari‡; The Glass Agency – Mehrdad Mirkiani; Saghar – Atefeh Razavi and Mehrdad Shekarabi
Best Special Effects: The Love Squadron – Saeed Hajimiri‡

Non-nomination Crystal Simorgh

Special Jury Prize
- The May Lady – Rakhshan Bani-Etemad‡

Films with multiple nominations and awards

The following 10 films received multiple nominations:

Nominations	Film
13	The Glass Agency
8	The Tree of Life
7	Birth of A Butterfly
7	The May Lady
3	Mercedes
3	The Sorcerer
3	The Pear Tree
2	Psycho
2	The Cloud and the Rising Sun
2	Takhti: The World Champion

The following 3 films received multiple awards:

Awards	Film
8	The Glass Agency
2	The Tree of Life
2	Birth of A Butterfly

== Competition of International Cinema ==
Crystal Simorgh for Best Film: The Promise – Luc Dardenne and Jean-Pierre Dardenne‡ (Belgium)	Crystal Simorgh for Best Director: Petr Václav – Marian‡ (Czech Republic and France)
Crystal Simorgh for Best Performance: Zhu Xu – The King of Masks‡ (China) (Actor); Golshifteh Farahani – The Pear Tree‡ (Iran) (Actress)	Crystal Simorgh for Best Screenplay: Super Citizen Ko – Wan Jen and Ching-Song Liao‡ (Taiwan)

Non-nomination Crystal Simorgh

Crystal Simorgh of Special Jury Prize
- The May Lady – Alireza Raisian and Jahangir Kosari, producers‡ (Iran)

Additional Honorary Diploma

- Best Cinematography: Mahmoud Kalari – The Pear Tree (Iran)
- Best Costume Design: Malek-Jahan Khazai and Mojtaba Ra'i – Birth of A Butterfly (Iran)

== Non-competitive sections ==
The festival's other sidebar sections included tributes to Anthony Quinn and Ezzatolah Entezami, retrospectives of the works of three directors —Fred Zinnemann, Krzysztof Kieślowski and Ebrahim Hatamikia—screening of the selected works for which Ennio Morricone had composed the music, "Festival of Festivals", and special screenings.

=== Facing Mirrors ===
Retrospective of the Fred Zinnemann's career highlights:

- The Men (1950)
- High Noon (1952)
- Behold a Pale Horse (1964)
- A Man for All Seasons (1966)
- The Day of the Jackal (1973)
- Julia (1977)

Retrospective of the Krzysztof Kieślowski's career highlights:

- Personnel (1975 TV film)
- The Calm (1976)
- Camera Buff (1979)
- Short Working Day (1981)
- Dekalog (1988 TV series): 1, 8 and 10 episodes
- A Short Film About Killing (1988)

=== The Green Narrative ===
Retrospective of the Ebrahim Hatamikia's career highlights:

- Identity (1987)
- The Scout (1989)
- The Immigrant (1990)
- Union of the Good (1992)
- From Karkheh to Rhein (1993)
- The Green Ashes (1994)
- The Scent of Joseph's Shirt (1996)
- Minoo Watchtower (1996)
- The Glass Agency (1998)

=== For All Seasons ===
Tribute to the Anthony Quinn by screening of 14 films of his career.

Tribute to the Ezzatolah Entezami by his career highlights:

- The Cow (Dariush Mehrjui, 1969)
- Hajji Washington (Ali Hatami, 1982)
- Kamalolmolk (Ali Hatami, 1985)
- The Lodgers (Dariush Mehrjui, 1987)
- The Stony Lion (Masoud Jafari Jozani, 1987)
- Grand Cinema (Hassan Hedayat, 1989)
- Once Upon a Time, Cinema (Mohsen Makhmalbaf, 1992)
- The Quiet Home (Mehdi Sabbaghzadeh, 1992)
- The Angel's Day (Behrouz Afkhami, 1994)
- The Blue-Veiled (Rakhshan Bani-Etemad, 1995)

=== Once Upon a Time ===
Tribute the Ennio Morricone by his career highlights:

- A Fistful of Dollars (Sergio Leone, 1964)
- The Hawks and the Sparrows (Pier Paolo Pasolini, 1966)
- My Name Is Nobody (Tonino Valerii, 1973)
- Last Days of Mussolini (Carlo Lizzani, 1974)
- Todo modo (Elio Petri, 1976)
- The Desert of the Tartars (Valerio Zurlini, 1976)
- Casualties of War (Brian De Palma, 1989)
- The Escort (Ricky Tognazzi, 1993)
- The Long Silence (Margarethe von Trotta, 1993)
- A Pure Formality (Giuseppe Tornatore, 1994)

== Ceremony information ==
63 films were requested to participate in the festival which 22 of them were approved for the "Competition of Iranian Cinema" section. For the first time, FIFF had had opening ceremony that took place on 31 January 1998, at the City Theater in Tehran, Iran. Also for the first time, press conference for each film of the competitive sections was held at the Sahra Cinema. elimination of the "Debut Films" section is another feature of festival's this edition.

The "Competition of International Cinema" section in the festival was introduced for the second time. The first time was in 1990. The section was added in order to FIFF accredit by FIAPF as a competitive international film festival. Sheila Whitaker mentioned that this was the first time in the festival's history, held an international competition with an international jury, headed by Abbas Kiarostami. At the closing ceremony, Kiarostami read out a statement in which he made it clear that the jury felt it impossible to give awards to foreign films that could only be screened in Iran with major cuts. (Note: including all scenes of sexuality, violence and drug-taking)

The "Iranian Film Market" (IFM) was established and took place during the festival. For example, National Film Development Corporation of India (NFDC), the central agency of Indian cinema, sent a delegation to the IFM and spent ₹83,864 (equivalent to ₹380,000 or US$4,500 in 2023) at this market.

=== Critical response ===
16th FIFF marked by a powerful selection committee that did not allow many commercial films to enter into competition section. An Audience Award also introduced this year. All these made the FIFF regain the credibility it had in the past, i.e. before the politicians not familiar with cinema took charge. However, impact of the former government's policies still remained.

== Footnotes ==
=== Sources ===
- سنگینی سیاست‌های گذشته بر بال سیمرغ بلورین شانزدهم [High impact of the former policies on the 16th Crystal Simorgh]. Gozāresh (in Persian). 85–86 (85–86): 162–163. March–April 1998. ISSN 1021-450X – via Noormags.
- "Fourth Session (Twelfth Lok Sabha)", Lok Sabha Debates (English Version), vol. 19, no. 19, New Delhi: Lok Sabha Secretariat, 15 April 1999
- Naficy, Hamid (2012). A Social History of Iranian Cinema, Volume 4: The Globalizing Era, 1984–2010. Durham: Duke University Press. ISBN 9780822348665.
- Rastin, Shadmehr (January–June 1998). "Fajr". Cinemaya. 39–40. ISSN 0970-8782.
- Yaʿqubian, Hamid-Reza (February 1998). شانزدهمین جشنواره فیلم فجر: تفاوت‌ها، ویژگی‌ها و نوآوری‌ها [16th Fajr Film Festival: Differences, features and innovations]. Gozāresh (in Persian). 84 (84): 78. ISSN 1021-450X – via Noormags.
- Zeydabadi-Nejad, Saeed (2009). The Politics of Iranian Cinema: Film and Society in the Islamic Republic. Abingdon, Oxon: Routledge. ISBN 9780415455374.
