= Abdollah Eskandari =

Iranian make-up artist

عبدالله اسکندری Abdollah Eskandari
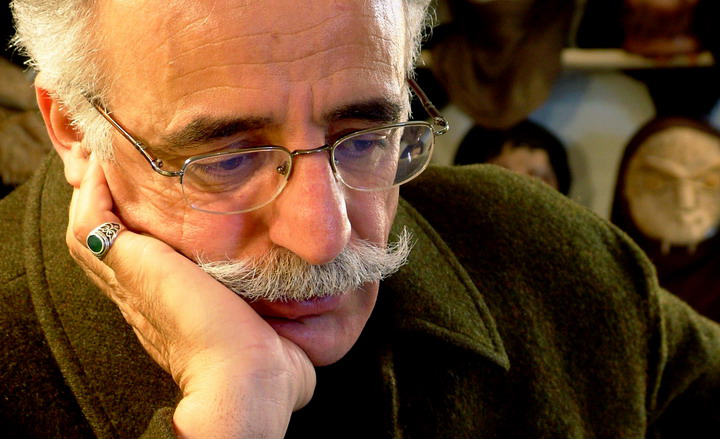
- Born: 18 October 1945 (age 80); Tehran, Imperial State of Iran
- Occupation: Makeup artist
- Years active: 1972–present

Abdollah Eskandari (Persian: عبدالله اسکندری, also Romanized as Abdollāh Eskandari; born 18 October 1945) is an Iranian make-up artist.

== Bio ==
Abdollah Eskandari is a make-up artist who teaches and designs make-up. He has worked in the capacity of make-up artist in over 170 feature films, over 20 historical TV series, and a number of theater and opera performances. Eskandari has also designed and performed make-up in France, Germany, Yugoslavia, Syria, Jordan, Morocco, UAE, and Malaysia.

A statue of Eskandari was unveiled at the Iran Television and Cinema Town in Tehran in 2019.

== Films ==
1. Personal Life (original title: Zendegie Khososi) | 2011 Persian: زندگی خصوصی
2. A Cube of Sugar (original title: Ye habe ghand) | 2011 Persian: یک حبه قند
3. A simple love Story (original title: Yek Asheghaneye Sadeh) | 2011 Persian: یه عاشقانه ساده
4. The second End (original title: Payan-e Dovom) | 2010 Persian: پایان دوم
5. Carousel (original title: Charkh o Falak) | 2010 Persian: چرخ و فلک
6. Dokhtar-e Shah-e Parion | 2010 Persian: دختر شاه پریون
7. Hello To love (original title: Salam Bar Eshgh) | 2009 Persian: سلام بر عشق
8. Aghaye Haft Rang| 2008 Persian: آقای هفت رنگ
9. Chehel Salegi | 2008 Persian: چهل سالگی
10. Heart Broken (original title: Del shekasteh) | 2008 Persian: دل شکسته
11. The Hunter (original title: Shekarchi) | 2008 Persian: شکارچی
12. There's Always a Woman in Between (original title: Hamisheh paye yek zan dar mian ast) | 2008 Persian: همیشه پای یک زن در میان است
13. The wall (original title: Divar) | 2008 Persian: دیوار
14. The women are angels (original title: Zanha fereshtehand) | 2007 Persian: زن‌ها فرشته اند
15. Kalagh Par | 2007 Persian: کلاغ پر
16. Taxi Driver (original title: Ranandeh Taxi) | 2006 Persian: راننده تاکسی
17. Soghate farang | 2006 Persian: سوغات فرنگ
18. Unexpected (original title: Gheir-e Montazereh) | 2006 Persian: غیرمنتظره
19. Guest (original title: Mehman) | 2006 Persian: مهمان
20. It's winter (original title: Zemestan ast)| 2006 Persian: زمستان است
21. Gone with the wind (original title bar bawd rafteh) | 2005 Persian: برباد رفته
22. Poet of the Wastes (original title: Shaere zobale-ha) | 2005 Persian: شاعر زباله‌ها
23. The pink Wedding (original title: Ezdevaj-e Sorati) | 2004 Persian: ازدواج صورتی
24. The Color Purple (original title: Be Rang-e Arghavan) | 2004 Persian: به رنگ ارغوان
25. Charlatan | 2004 Persian: شارلاتان
26. The Runaway Bride (original title: Arouse farari) | 2004 Persian: عروس فراری
27. Ghoroob Shod bia | 2004 Persian: غروب شد بیا
28. The Mask (original title: Neghab) | 2004 Persian: نقاب
29. A slice of Bread (original title: Yek teke nan) | 2004 Persian: یک تکه نان
30. Tara and the Strawberry Fever (original title: tara va tab-e toot farangi) | 2003 Persian: تارا و تب توت فرنگی
31. The Silent King (original title: Shah-e khamoosh) | 2003 Persian: شاه خاموش
32. Coma | 2003 Persian: کما
33. The Fever (original title: Tab) | 2003 Persian: تب
34. Inja cheraghi roshan ast| 2002 Persian: اینجا چراغی روشن است
35. yellow rose (original title: Roz-e zard) | 2002 Persian: رز زرد
36. The felicific Bride (original title: Aroos-e Khosh Ghadam) | 2002 Persian: عروس خوش قدم
37. Atash | 2002 Persian: عطش
38. Zamaneh | 2001 Persian: زمانه
39. Khakestari | 2001 Persian: خاکستری
40. Ab va Atash | 2001 Persian: آب و آتش
41. Passenger From Rey (original title: Mosafere rey) | 2000 Persian: مسافر ری
42. Swan Song (original title: Avaz-e ghoo) | 2000 Persian: آواز قو
43. Rely on the wind (original title: Tekyeh bar Baad) | 2000 Persian: تکیه بر باد
44. Dokhyari be nam-e Tondar | 2000 Persian: دختری به نام تندر
45. The Nights of Tehran (original title: Shabhaye Tehran) | 2000 Persian: شب‌های تهران
46. The Day I Became a Woman (original title: Roozi ke zan shodam) | 2000 Persian: روزیکه زن شدم
47. Kandahar (original title: Safar e Ghandehar) | 2000 Persian: سفر قندهار
48. Maturity (original title: Bolugh) | 2000 Persian: بلوغ
49. The Actor (original title: Bazigar) | 1999 Persian: بازیگر
50. Friends (original title: Doostan) | 1999 Persian: دوستان
51. Ranger | 1999 Persian: رنجر
52. Tehran, New Age (original title: Tehran, Roozegar-e no) | 1999 Persian: تهران، روزگار نو
53. Eshghe Taher | 1999 Persian: عشق طاهر
54. Baanoo | 1999 Persian: بانو
55. Malek Khatoon | 1999 Persian: ملک خاتون
56. Victorious warrior (original title: Jangjoo-ye pirooz) | 1998 Persian: جنگجوی پیروز
57. Island stories (First Episode: The lost cousin (original title: Dastan-haye Jazire (Epizod-e Aval: Dokhtar daee-ye Gomshodeh)) | 1998 Persian: (داستان‌های جزیره (اپیزود اول، دختردایی گمشده
58. The Girl in the Sneakers (original title: Dokhtari ba kafsh-haye-katani) | 1998 Persian: دختری با کفش‌های کتانی
59. Heeva | 1998 Persian: هیوا
60. The Pear Tree (original title: Derakhte Golabi) | 1998 Persian: درخت گلابی
61. Claws in the Dust (original title: Panje dar khak) | 1997 Persian: پنجه در خاک
62. Pilot (original title: Khalaban) | 1997 Persian: خلبان
63. The Fifth Season (original title: Fasl-e Panjom) | 1997 Persian: فصل پنجم
64. Komakam kon | 1997 Persian: کمکم کن
65. Komiteh mojazat | 1997 Persian: کمیته مجازات
66. Zakhmi | 1997 Persian: زخمی
67. The Upside down world (original title: Donya-ye varooneh) | 1996 Persian: دنیای وارونه
68. Sahereh | 1996 Persian: ساحره
69. Aghrab | 1996 Persian: عقرب
70. Javanmard | 1996 Persian: جوانمرد
71. Counterattack (original title: patak) | 1996 Persian: پاتک
72. Lost Love (original title: Eshghe Gomshodeh) | 1995 Persian: عشق گمشده
73. The SandStorm (original title: Toofan-e Shen) | 1995 Persian: طوفان شن
74. Adam barfi | 1995 Persian: آدم برفی
75. Chehreh | 1995 Persian: چهره
76. E'adeye amniat | 1995 Persian: اعاده امنیت
77. Nejatyaftegan | 1995 Persian: نجات یافتگان
78. Pari | 1995 Persian: پری
79. Reyhaneh | 1995 Persian: ریحانه
80. The Fateful Day (original title: Ruz-e vagh'e) | 1995 Persian: روز واقعه
81. Safar be Chazabeh | 1995 Persian: سفر به چزابه
82. Born loser (original title: Pakbakhteh) | 1994 Persian: پاکباخته
83. Crossing the Red Line (original title: Oboor az khat-e sorkh) | 1994 Persian: عبوراز خط سرخ
84. Sunshine Man (original title: mard-e Aftabi) | 1994 Persian: مرد آفتابی
85. The Moon And The Sun (original title:Mah o khorshid) | 1994 Persian: ماه و خورشید
86. The Last Port (original title: Akharin bandar) | 1994 Persian: آخرین بندر
87. Roya-ye nime-shab-e tabestan | 1994 Persian: رویای نیمه شب تابستان
88. The Indian Gift (original title: Tohfe-ye Hend) | 1994 Persian: تحفه هند
89. A man, A Bear (original title: Yek mard, yek khers) | 1994 Persian: یک مرد، یک خرس
90. The Blue-Veiled (original title: Rusari Abi) | 1993 Persian: روسری آبی
91. Khaneh Khalvat | 1993 Persian: خانه خلوت
92. Shaheed-e-Kufa | 1992 Persian: شهید کوفه
93. Tranzit | 1992 Persian: ترانزیت
94. Rooz-e fereshte | 1993 Persian: روز فرشته
95. Raz-e Gol-e Shab bo | 1992 Persian: راز گل شب بو
96. The Bait (original title: To'me) | 1992 Persian: طعمه
97. Ayalvar | 1992 Persian: عیال وار
98. The Actor (original title: Honarpisheh) | 1992 Persian: هنرپیشه
99. The Song of Tehran (original title: Avaz-e Tehran) | 1992 Persian: آواز تهران
100. Baziche | 1992 Persian: بازیچه
101. Del shodegan | 1992 Persian: دلشدگان
102. Dadsetan | 1991 Persian: دادستان
103. Secret of the Red Fountain (original title:Raz-e cheshme-ye sorkh) | 1991 Persian: راز چشمه سرخ
104. The Big Circus (original title: Sirk-e Bozorg) | 1991 Persian: سیرک بزرگ
105. School of old men (original title: Madreseye piremardha) | 1991 Persian: مدرسه پیرمردها
106. Nassereddin Shah, Actor-e Cinema | 1991 Persian: ناصرالدین شاه :آکتور سینما
107. Narges | 1991 Persian: نرگس
108. Hoor in Fire (original title: Hoor dar Atash) | 1991 Persian: هور در آتش
109. The Secret of the Dagger (original title: Raz-e Khanjar) | 1990 Persian: راز خنجر
110. The magic Trip (original title: Safar-e Jadooee) | 1990 Persian: سفر جادویی
111. The Bride (original title: Aroos) | 1990 Persian: عروس
112. Galan | 1990 Persian: گالان
113. Apartment No. 13 (original title: Apartmane shomare 13) | 1990 Persian: آپارتمان شماره 13
114. Dozd aroosakha | 1990 Persian: دزد عروسک‌‌ها
115. Hamoun | 1990 Persian: هامون
116. Swim in Winter (original title: Shena dar zemestan) | 1990 Persian: شنا در زمستان
117. The Last Fly (original title: Akharin Parvaz) | 1989 Persian: آخرین پرواز
118. Bagh-e Seyed | 1989 Persian: باغ سید
119. Contact (original title: Tamas) | 1989 Persian: تماس
120. All The Temptations of Earth (original title: Tamam-e Vasvase-haye Zamin) | 1989 Persian: تمام وسوسه‌های زمین
121. Bunning Spruce (original title: Senobar-haye Soozan) | 1989 Persian: صنوبر‌های سوزان
122. The Mother (original title: Madar) | 1989 Persian: مادر
123. Nakhlestan-e Teshne | 1989 Persian: نخلستان تشنه
124. Savalan | 1989 Persian: ساوالان
125. Rajaee School (original title: Madrese-ye Rajaee) | 1989 Persian: مدرسه رجایی
126. Night of the incident (original title: Shab-e Hadese) | 1989 Persian: شب حادثه
127. The Heritage (original title: Ersieh) | 1988 Persian: ارثیه
128. The Horizon (original title: ofogh) | 1988 Persian: افق
129. Canary Yellow (original title: Zard-e ghanary) | 1988 Persian: زرد قناری
130. Tooba | 1988 Persian: طوبی
131. Marriage of the Chosen (original title: Arousi-ye Khouban) | 1988 Persian: عروسی خوبان
132. The Pit (original title: Godal) | 1988 Persian: گودال
133. Little Bird of Happiness (original title: Parande-ye khoochak-e Khoshbakhti) | 1988 Persian: پرنده کوچک خوشبختی
134. Shadows of sorrow (original title: Saye-haye Gham) | 1988 Persian: سایه‌های غم
135. The Crisis (original title: Bohran) | 1987 Persian: بحران
136. The Train (original title: Teran) | 1987 Persian: ترن
137. Jafar Khan az farang bargashte | 1987 Persian: جعفرخان از فرنگ برگشته
138. House like a Town (original title: Khaneh-i mesl-e shahr) | 1987 Persian: خانه ای مثل شهر
139. Trace on Sand (original title: rad-e paee bar shen) | 1987 Persian: ردپایی بر شن
140. The Lost (original title: Gomshodegan) | 1987 Persian: گمشدگان
141. Punishment (original title: Mokafat) | 1987 Persian: مکافات
142. The Stranger (original title: Gharibeh) | 1987 Persian: غریبه
143. The Blade and the Silk (original title: Tigh o Abrisham) | 1987 Persian: تیغ و ابریشم
144. The Cyclist (original title: Bicycleran) | 1987 Persian: بای سیکل ران
145. Dar jostejuye ghahraman | 1987 Persian: در جستجوی قهرمان
146. Report of a Murder (original title: Gozaresh-e yek ghatl) | 1987 Persian: گزارش یک قتل
147. Captain Khorshid (original title: nakhoda Khorshid) | 1987 Persian: ناخدا خورشید
148. Payizan | 1987 Persian: پائیزان
149. The Organization (original title: Tashkilat) | 1986 Persian: تشکیلات
150. The Last Image (original title: Tasvir-e Akhar) | 1986 Persian: تصویر آخر
151. Tirbaran | 1986 Persian: تیرباران
152. The Peddler: First Episode (original title: Dast Foroosh: Episode Aval) | 1986 Persian: دست فروش :اپیزود اول
153. The Peddler: Second Episode (original title: Dast Foroosh: Episode Dovom) | 1986 Persian: دست فروش :اپیزود دوم
154. Story of Life (original title: Ghese-ye zendegi) | 1986 Persian: قصه زندگی
155. The Pathway (original title: Gozargah) | 1986 Persian: گذرگاه
156. The Mission (original title: Ma’moriat) | 1986 Persian: ماموریت
157. Harim-e Mehrvarzi | 1986 Persian: حریم مهرورزی
158. Beside the Lake (original title: Kenar-e Berke ha) | 1986 Persian: کنار برکه‌ها
159. The Boycott (original title: Baykot) | 1985 Persian: بایکوت
160. The Cold Roads (original title: Jadehaye Sard) | 1985 Persian: جاده‌های سرد
161. The Tornado (original title: Gerdbaad) | 1985 Persian: گردباد
162. The Detrition (original title: Avar) | 1985 Persian: آوار
163. Night Breaker (original title: Shab Shekan) | 1984 Persian: شب شکن
164. The Escape (original title: Farar) | 1984 Persian: فرار
165. Ste’aze | 1984 Persian: استعاذه
166. Kamalolmolk | 1984 Persian: کمال‌الملک
167. Golhaye Davoudi | 1984 Persian: گل‌های داوودی
168. Do Cheshman Beesu | 1984 Persian: دو چشمان بی‌سو
169. Tohfeha | 1984 Persian: تحفه‌ها
170. Soil and Blood (original title: Khak o Khoon) | 1983 Persian: خاک و خون
171. Shilat | 1983 Persian: شیلات
172. Death of Yazdgerd (original title: Marg Yazdgerd) | 1982 Persian: مرگ یزدگرد
173. Goft har se nafareshan | 1980 Persian: گفت هر سه نفرشان
174. Flight in Cage (original title: Parvaz Dar Ghafas) | 1980 Persian: پرواز در قفس
175. Salandar | 1980 Persian: سلندر
176. Tall Shadows of the Wind (original title: Sayehaye bolande bad) | 1978 Persian: سایه‌های بلند باد
177. The Smell of Wheat (original title: Boo-ye Gandom) | 1978 Persian: بوی گندم
178. The Grey (original title: Khakestari) | 1977 Persian: خاکستری
179. Along the Night (original title: Dar Emtedad Shab) | 1977 Persian: در امتداد شب
180. The Idol (original title: Bot) | 1976 Persian: بت
181. The Iconoclast (original title: BotShekan) | 1976 Persian: بت شکن
182. Speeding naked till high noon (original title: Berehne ta zohr ba sorat) | 1976 Persian: برهنه تا ظهر با سرعت
183. Divine One (original title: Malakout) | 1976 Persian: ملکوت
184. The Deer (original title: Gavaznha) | 1976 Persian: گوزن‌ها
185. Zabih | 1975 Persian: ذبیح
186. Night of Foreigners (original title: Shab-e Ghariban) | 1975 Persian: شب غریبان
187. The Hive (original title: Kandou) | 1975 Persian: کندو
188. Nazanin | 1975 Persian: نازنین
189. The Secret of the Treasure of the Jinn Valley (original title: Asrar ganj dareheye jenni) | 1974 Persian: اسرار گنج دره جنی

== Television series ==
1. Mokhtarnameh | 2010-2011 Persian: مختارنامه
2. Ashpazbashi | 2009-2010 Persian: آشپزباشی
3. Zero Degree Turn (original title: Madare sefr darajeh)| 2007 Persian: مدار صفر درجه
4. Under the Blade (original title: Zire Tigh) | 2006 Persian: زیر تیغ
5. Shahr Ashoob | 2005 Persian: شهرآشوب
6. The Third Sense (original title: Hes-e Sevom) | 2005 Persian: حس سوم
7. Mashgh-e Eshgh | 2004 Persian: مشق عشق
8. Night of Nights (original title: Shab-i az shab-ha) | 2004 Persian: شبی از شبها
9. Lost Impeccability (original title: Masoomiyat Az Dast Rafte)| 2002-2003 Persian: معصومیت از دست رفته
10. The Green Journey (original title: Safar-e Sabz)| 2001 Persian: سفر سبز
11. Lost (original title: Gomgashteh)| 2001 Persian: گمگشته
12. Neighbors (original title: Hamsaye ha)| 2000 Persian: همسایه ها
13. The English Bag (original title: Kif-e Englisi) | 1999 Persian: کیف انگلیسی
14. Muzzle-loading Gun (original title: Tofang-e Sarpor) | 1999-2001 Persian: تفنگ سرپر
15. Apartment No.13 (original title: Aparteman-e shomareh 13) | 1990 Persian: آپارتمان شماره 13
16. [Shaheed-e-Kufa|Imam Ali | 1997-1998 Persian: امام علی
17. Once Upen a time (original title: Roozi Roozegari) | 1991 Persian: روزی روزگاری
18. Masal Abad | 1984 Persian: مثل آباد
19. Amir Kabir | 1984 Persian: امیرکبیر
20. Hezar Dastan | 1978-1987 Persian: هزاردستان
21. My Uncle Napoleon (original title: Dai jan Napelon) | 1976 Persian: دایی جان ناپلئون
22. Braves of Tangestan (original title: Daliran-e Tangestan) | 1974 Persian: دلیران تنگستان
23. Headsman Cries (original title: Dezhkhim migeryad) | 1973 Persian: دژخیم می گرید

== Theater ==
1. Gold Teeth (original title: Dandoon Tala) | 2001 Persian: دندون طلا
2. Eshgh Abad Persian: عشق آباد

== International TV series ==
1. Zayed & The Dream (original title: Zayed va roya) | 2008 | Abu Dhabi
2. Cup of Blood (original title: Fenjan al-dam) | 2007 | Syria TV
3. Sallahedin | 2001 | Syria TV

== Awards ==
1. Crystal Simorgh of Best Make-up from 8th Fajr International Film Festival For "Mother" (original title: Madar) | 1989 Persian: مادر
2. Crystal Simorgh of Best Make-up from 10th Fajr International Film Festival For "Nassereddin Shah, Actor-e Cinema" | 1991 Persian: ناصرالدین شاه :آکتور سینما
3. Crystal Simorgh of Best Make-up from 13th Fajr International Film Festival For "The Fateful Day" (original title: Ruz-e vagh'e) | 1995 Persian: روز واقعه
4. Crystal Simorgh of Best Make-up from 16th Fajr International Film Festival For "Sahereh" | 1996 Persian: ساحره
5. Crystal Simorgh of Best Make-up from 19th Fajr International Film Festival For "Passenger From Rey" (original title: Mosafere rey) | 2000 Persian: مسافر ری
6. Crystal Simorgh of lifetime Achievement at 23rd Fajr International Film Festival For Commemoration and Appreciation For years of distinguished | 2003
7. Award of Best Make-up from 2nd House of Cinema Festival For "Baanoo" | 1999 Persian: بانو
8. Award of Best Make-up from 15th House of Cinema Festival For "A cube of sugar" (original title: Ye habe ghand) | 2011 Persian: یک حبه قند
9. Commemoration and Appreciation from 2nd large Celebration of Actors | 2003
10. Award of Best Make-up Artist from Film report Magazin | 1997
11. Award of Best Make-up Artist from Film report Magazin | 1994
12. Honorary diploma of Best Make-up Artist from 4th Cima Festival | 1994
13. Certificate of Best Make-up Artist from official Iran TV (Seda va Sima) for The English Bag (original title: Kif-e Englisi | 1999 Persian: کیف انگلیسی
14. Award of Best Make-up Artist from Dubai Film Festival
15. Award of Best Make-up from Syria Film Festival For "Cup of Blood" (original title: Fenjan al-dam) | 2007 | Syria TV
16. Award of Best Make-up Artist from Adonia Film Festival of Syria | 2011
17. Award of Best Artistic Achievement for "Lantouri" | 2017
