= Grand Cinema (disambiguation) =

Grand Cinema is a 1989 film.

Grand Cinema may also refer to:

- Grand Theatre (Shanghai), also known as Grand Cinema
- Grand Cinemas, a cinema chain in the Western Australia, Australia
