= Ebrahim Abadi =

Iranian actor (1934–2019)

- ابراهیم آبادی
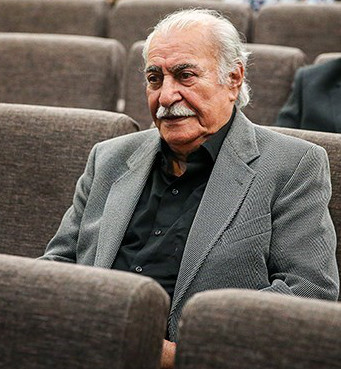
- Abadi at the memorial service for Homa Rousta, October 2015
- Born: 15 August 1934; Tabriz, Iran
- Died: 31 October 2019 (aged 85); Tehran, Iran
- Occupation: Actor
- Spouse: Maliheh Ebrahimi
- Children: 5

Ebrahim Abadi (Persian: ابراهیم آبادی; 15 August 1934 – 31 October 2019) was an Iranian stage, film, and television actor. He is best known for his roles in films and TV series such as Grand Cinema, Mokhtarnameh, On Tiptoes, and Dar Chashm-e Baad.

== Early life and education ==
Abadi was born on 15 August 1934 in Tabriz, Iran. He went to school in Tabriz up to fifth grade, then moved to Tehran to finish his schooling. In high school he became interested in acting and took theatre classes from visiting teachers.

After a year of study with the teachers Davidson and Kotkim B, he joined an arts academy and trained under the directors Ali Asghar Garmsiri and Hooshang Sarang. He later moved to Czechoslovakia to study further and graduated from the Academy of Performing Arts in Prague in 1967.

== Career ==
Abadi began his acting career on stage in 1953 with a role in the play Haqbaz's Son. In his 14 years in Czechoslovakia, he acted with professional theatre companies there.

Back in Iran, Abadi worked for the Ministry of Culture and Art, setting up and running theatre in different regions. He spent seven years in Urmia, one year in Gorgan and eight years in Tabriz. In these cities he set up local theatre groups and directed nearly 60 plays. He retired from his theatre management job in 1993.

Abadi's first film role came in 1984, in Yadollah Samadi's Za'er Khalaf (Pilgrim Khalaf). Over the next two decades, he acted in around 40 films, including Grand Cinema (1988), Apartment No. 13 (1990), Smell of Camphor, Fragrance of Jasmine (1999), Tokyo Non-Stop (2002), and 100 Years to These Years (2007). On television, he was in popular Iranian series such as Under the City's Skin, Tenth Night, Lost Innocence, On Tiptoes, and Mokhtarnameh.

Abadi was also a judge and organiser at several cultural events, such as the Shohada-ye Mehrab Festival in Tabriz. He was a member of the Central Council of the Iranian Cinema Actors Association at the Iranian Alliance of Motion Picture Guilds (Khaneh Cinema).

== Personal life ==
Abadi was married to Maliheh Ebrahimi (born 1930), a makeup artist and actress from Tabriz. She got a diploma in makeup in Prague and later acted in several Iranian films, starting with Diamond 33 in 1967. The couple had five children.

== Illness and death ==
In October 2019, Abadi was taken to hospital in Tehran with a serious lung illness, and on 10 October he fell into a coma. He had surgery on 21 October, but died on 31 October 2019 at the age of 85.

== Filmography ==
=== Cinema ===
- Pilgrim Khalaf (1984)
- Boycott (1985)
- The Rings (1985)
- Sand Tracking (1987)
- Station (1987)
- Grand Cinema (1988)
- The Good Wedding (1988)
- Window (1988)
- Doll Skins (1989)
- Dust Crossing (1989)
- June 5 Flight (1989)
- All One Nation (1989)
- Apartment No. 13 (1990)
- Khatoon Property (1990)
- Satan's Call (1992)
- Unfinished Man (1992)
- All My Girls (1993)
- Hasrat (1994)
- I Want to Survive (1994)
- Smell of Good Life (1994)
- Conspiracy (1995)
- Invisible Man (1995)
- Summer Holidays (1995)
- Yahya (1995)
- Abraham (1996)
- Behind the Night Wall (1997)
- The Badaskaran (1997)
- World of Upside (1997)
- Mummy 3 (1999)
- Smell of Camphor, Fragrance of Jasmine (1999)
- Star Sky (1999)
- My Favorite Wife (2000)
- Sweet Jam (2001)
- Tokyo Non-Stop (2002)
- I Am Not Bin Laden (2004)
- Qalqlak (2005)
- Remote (2005)
- Whatever You Want (2006)
- 100 Years to These Years (2007)
- Wall (2007)

=== Television ===
- Under the City's Skin (2001)
- Tenth Night (2002)
- On Tiptoes (2002)
- Lost Innocence (2003)
- Dar Chashm-e Baad (2008–2009)
- Mokhtarnameh (2010–2011)

== Awards ==
- 1991: Crystal Simorgh for Best Supporting Actor, 9th Fajr Film Festival, for Apartment No. 13
