= The Chef (TV series) =

2009 Iranian TV series

- Also known as: Ashpazbashi
- Genre: Family; Comedy
- Directed by: Mohammad-Reza Honarmand
- Starring: Parviz Parastui; Fatemeh Motamed-Arya
- Theme music composer: Amin Honarmand
- Country of origin: Iran
- Original language: Persian
- No. of seasons: 1
- No. of episodes: 26

Production
- Producer: Javad Noruzbegi
- Production locations: Tehran, Iran
- Cinematography: Masud Korani
- Editor: Amir Purabbasi
- Running time: 45 minutes

Original release
- Network: IRIB TV1

The Chef (Persian: آشپزباشی), is a 2009 Iranian TV series directed by Mohammad Reza Honarmand. It tells the story of a successful couple that manage a very high-quality restaurant in Tehran, Iran. Both Parviz Parastui and Fatemeh Motamed-Arya have previously acted in Honarmand's films and series such as The Changed Man, Azizam Man Kook Nistam, and Zire Tigh.

== Plot ==
A happily married couple runs one of the most successful restaurants in Tehran. The husband is the head chef and the wife is the manager. But when she goes around tooting her own horn on a television show, without acknowledging her husband's efforts, he takes offence and leaves the restaurant to launch a new one. What starts out as a small argument, keeps rising until it threatens to tear their family apart.

== Cast ==
- Parviz Parastui as Akbar AliMagham
- Fatemeh Motamed-Arya as Mino KheyrKhah
- Farhad Aslani
- Manouchehr Azari
- Afsaneh Chehreh Azad
- Mohammad Reza Ghaffari
- Roohollah Kamani
- Asha Mehrabi
- Feraidon Mehrabi
- Hushang Harirchiyan
- Shabnam Moghaddami
- Mehraveh Sharifinia as Sara
- Melika Sharifinia
- Ali Tabatabai
- Hoda Zeinolabedin
- Mehrdad Ziaei

== Broadcast History ==
- IRIB TV1 (2009–2010)
- TV Alhijrah (in Malaysia, 2011-2012)
- iFilm (2012–Present)
