= Leily Is with Me =

- Film poster
- Directed by: Kamal Tabrizi
- Written by: Kamal Tabrizi; Reza Maghsoudi
- Starring: Parviz Parastui; Mahmud Azizi; Mahdi Faqih; Ali Ghaffari; Sahereh Matin
- Release date: 1996
- Running time: 95 minutes
- Country: Iran
- Language: Persian

Leily Is with Me (Persian: لیلی با من است) is a 1996 Iranian comedy war film directed by Kamal Tabrizi. The film was also televised as a mini-series split into five episodes. It was the first Iranian film to use humor in the war context. The film is a popular comedy in Iran.

== Plot ==
The film depicts the story of a cameraman named Sadegh (played by Parviz Parastui) during the Iran–Iraq War. Sadegh works for television and has a lot of economic problems. He is in great need of a loan to solve his problems. A friend suggests he should have a short visit to the war zone to prepare a report from there. This would make demonstrate his patriotic and ideological commitment and land him the loan he needs. Sadegh is scared of the war zone but for the sake of the loan he decides to go. He accompanies Mr. Kamali, a more senior television employee, who seems to him a loyal believer in the cause of the war. Sadegh's short plan for visiting the war-affected areas far from the front line turns into a nightmare as he finds himself getting ever closer to the front line and death. While he tries to escape the situation, he still needs to prove himself to Kamali and avoid showing himself as a coward. The audience gradually finds out that Kamali is as coward as Sadegh and desperately wishes to leave the warzone too. It's only the audience that knows Sadegh and Kamali both have misconceptions about each other. As Sadegh designs plans to gradually get away from the front line, incidents make him closer and closer to face-to-face confrontation with the enemy. That's why Kamali thinks of him as a crazy suicidal warrior and tries to get rid of him. Meanwhile Sadegh's view towards Iranian fighters starts to change from crazy men willing to die to ordinary men loving to safeguard their country and believes. Sadegh is finally trapped in the front line and gets besieged by an army of tanks while the only living man near him is a wounded RPG shooter. He guides Sadegh how to shoot and Sadegh has to face all his fears confronting with the tanks. Sadegh shoots the tank and the same time seems to get killed by the tank's shooting. In the next scene Sadegh's family and friends go to find his dead body in the hospital. But they find out he is only wounded but not dead. To their surprise Sadegh is not the man he used to be as he expresses his willingness to go to the war zone again.

The name Leily has its roots in Persian poetry and the tale of Layla and Majnun. Leily is a symbol of the beloved and the title of the film refers to Sadegh finding the ultimate beloved in his journey.

== Cast ==
- Parviz Parastui – Sadeq Meshkini
- Mahmud Azizi – Kamali
- Maziar Lorestani – Elaheh
- Sahereh Matin - Sadeq's Aunt
