= The Rings =

The Rings (Zangha)
- Directed by: Mohammad Reza Honarmand
- Written by: Mohsen Makhmalbaf
- Starring: Mohammad Kasebi; Ebrahim Abadi
- Cinematography: Abbas Takin
- Music by: Ali Gholamali
- Distributed by: Islamic artistic centre of Iran
- Release date: 1985
- Running time: 88 min.
- Language: Persian

The Rings is a 1985 Iranian horror mystery film written by director Mohsen Makhmalbaf and directed by Mohammad Reza Honarmand. It tells the story of a reporter investigating the sudden, inexplicable deaths of a growing number of people who had received phone calls informing them of exactly how long they had to live. The word Zangha is Persian for "The Rings" (as in telephone rings).

== Plot ==
The citizens of an unnamed city are being terrorized by an extraordinary killer. The victims pick up a ringing phone and are told by a mysterious voice how long they have to live. Invariably, they all die in mysterious ways at the exact specified moment.

A reporter begins to investigate the phenomenon, but the more he investigates the deaths the more mysterious they seem. As he delves into more cases, he becomes personally involved and obsessed. Before long, he finds his family and finally himself targets of the elusive killer. The film ends with the reporter's death. The nature of who or what (if anything) caused the deaths is not resolved in the end, and the audience is left to decide on the film's narrative.

== See also ==
- Cinema of Iran
