= Hamid Samandarian =

Iranian film director

Hamid Samandarian حمید سمندریان
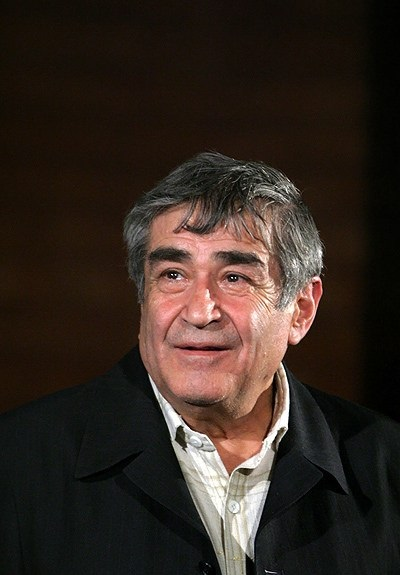
- Born: May 6, 1931; Tehran, Persia
- Died: July 12, 2012 (aged 81); Tehran, Iran
- Resting place: 88 Segment, Behesht-e Zahra Cemetery
- Occupations: Film director, theatre director, screenwriter, playwright, translator
- Spouse: Homa Rousta (m. 1972)
- Children: 1

Hamid Samandarian (Persian: حمید سمندریان; May 6, 1931 – July 12, 2012) was an Iranian film and theater director and translator. He staged numerous dramas including No Exit by Jean-Paul Sartre, Ghosts by Henrik Ibsen, The Glass Menagerie by Tennessee Williams and Marriage of Mr. Mississippi by Friedrich Durrenmatt.

Having established many acting and directing classes and workshops, Samandarian trained many Iranian actors and directors including; Ezzatolah Entezami, Reza Kianian, Golab Adineh, Mehdi Hashemi, Shahab Hosseini, Hojjat Baqaee, Parviz Poorhosseini, Ahmad Aghalou, etc. He married Homa Rousta, an Iranian film and theater actress.

== Teaching ==
Danial Hakimi was one of his students.

=== Theater ===
He translated and then staged many famous plays written by famous playwrights during his lifetime such as Friedrich Durrenmatt, Bertolt Brecht, Anton Chekhov, Eugène Ionesco, Arthur Miller, Max Frisch, Tennessee Williams, Jean-Paul Sartre, and Henrik Ibsen.

- The Visit of the Lady, Friedrich Dürrenmatt – 2008
- The Caucasian Chalk Circle, Bertolt Brecht – 1999
- The Marriage of Mr. Mississippi, Friedrich Dürrenmatt – 1990
- The Seagull, Anton Chekhov – 1978
- Play Strindberg, Friedrich Dürrenmatt – 1973 and 2000
- Rhinoceros, Eugène Ionesco – 1973
- A View from the Bridge, Arthur Miller – 1970
- Andorra, Max Frisch – 1968
- The Forced Marriage, Molière – 1965
- The Glass Menagerie, Tennessee Williams – 1964
- Morts sans sépulture, Jean-Paul Sartre – 1964 and 1979
- Ghosts, Henrik Ibsen – 1964

His translation of Bertolt Brecht's play Life of Galileo was published in 2014.

=== Cinema ===
He directed one film, All the Temptations of the Earth, in 1989.

=== Written works ===
Many of his translations are published to Persian readership. Other than translations, some interviews with Samandarian are published. One book-length instance is in sahne khaneye man ast ("This Stage is my House"). He is also one of the directors whose talks are included in Ahmad Kamyabi Mask's important Qu'a-t-on fait de Rhinocéros d'Eugène Ionesco à travers le monde?: Allemagne, France, Roumanie, Iran, Japon, U.S.A..
