= The Changed Man =

The Changed Man Persian: مرد عوضی
- Film poster
- Directed by: Mohammad Reza Honarmand
- Written by: Farhad Tohidi
- Starring: Parviz Parastui; Fatemeh Motamed-Arya; Afsaneh Bayegan
- Music by: Mohammad Reza Aligholi
- Release date: 1998
- Running time: 100 min.
- Country: Iran
- Language: Persian

The Changed Man is a 1998 Iranian romantic comedy directed by Mohammad Reza Honarmand.

== Plot ==
Khosro Paziresh, the inventor of a magical washing powder, goes to a company to sell his invention but he falls down the elevator and gets transferred to a hospital. Darioosh Jam, the CEO of the company, dies from a stroke after finding out that his company is bankrupt and he too gets transferred to the same hospital. The transplant team in the hospital, transplant Khosro's brain in Darioosh's body and Khosro stays alive in the CEO's body.

== Cast ==
- Parviz Parastui
- Fatemeh Motamed-Arya
- Afsaneh Bayegan
- Zohreh Mojabi
- Mahmud Pakniyat
- Reza Shafiei Jam
