= Ali Dehkordi =

Iranian actor

- علی دهکردی
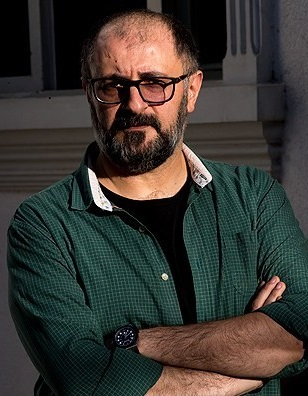
- Born: Ali Esmaeili Dehkordi; November 8, 1965 (age 60); Shahrekord, Chaharmahal and Bakhtiari Province, Iran
- Education: University of Tehran
- Occupation: Actor
- Years active: 1992–present
- Spouse: Afarin Chitsaz (1989–2002)

Ali Esmaeil Dehkordi (born 8 November 1965 in Shahrekord) is an Iranian actor. He began his acting career with From Karkheh to Rhine, a film produced by Ebrahim Hatamikia in 1992.

== Filmography ==
=== Cinema ===
- From Karkheh to Rhine (1992)
- Paeez Boland (1994)
- Roze Sheytan (1995)
- Sheykhe Mofid (1996)
- Mah o Khorshid (1996)
- Abor Az Khate Sorkh (1996)
- Khalaban (1997)
- Mah o Khorshid (1997)
- Sejdeh Bar Ab (1997)
- Gahi Be Aseman Negah Kon (2003)
- Salam (2004)
- An Mard Amad (2008)
- Democracy at the Sun (2009)
- Ekhrajiha 3 (2010)
- Mr. President's telephone (2011)

=== TV Series ===
- Mehr O Mah (1992)
- Mozdeh Tars (1993)
- Dar Ghalbe Man (1996)
- Akharin Gonah (2002)
- Sheykhe Baha'i (2008)
- Mosafereh Zaman (2008)
- Malakoot (2010)
- Ehzar (2021)

== See also ==
- Iranian cinema
