= Computer Research Center of Islamic Sciences =

Iranian online Islamic resource

Coordinates: 34.629891°N 50.865403°E

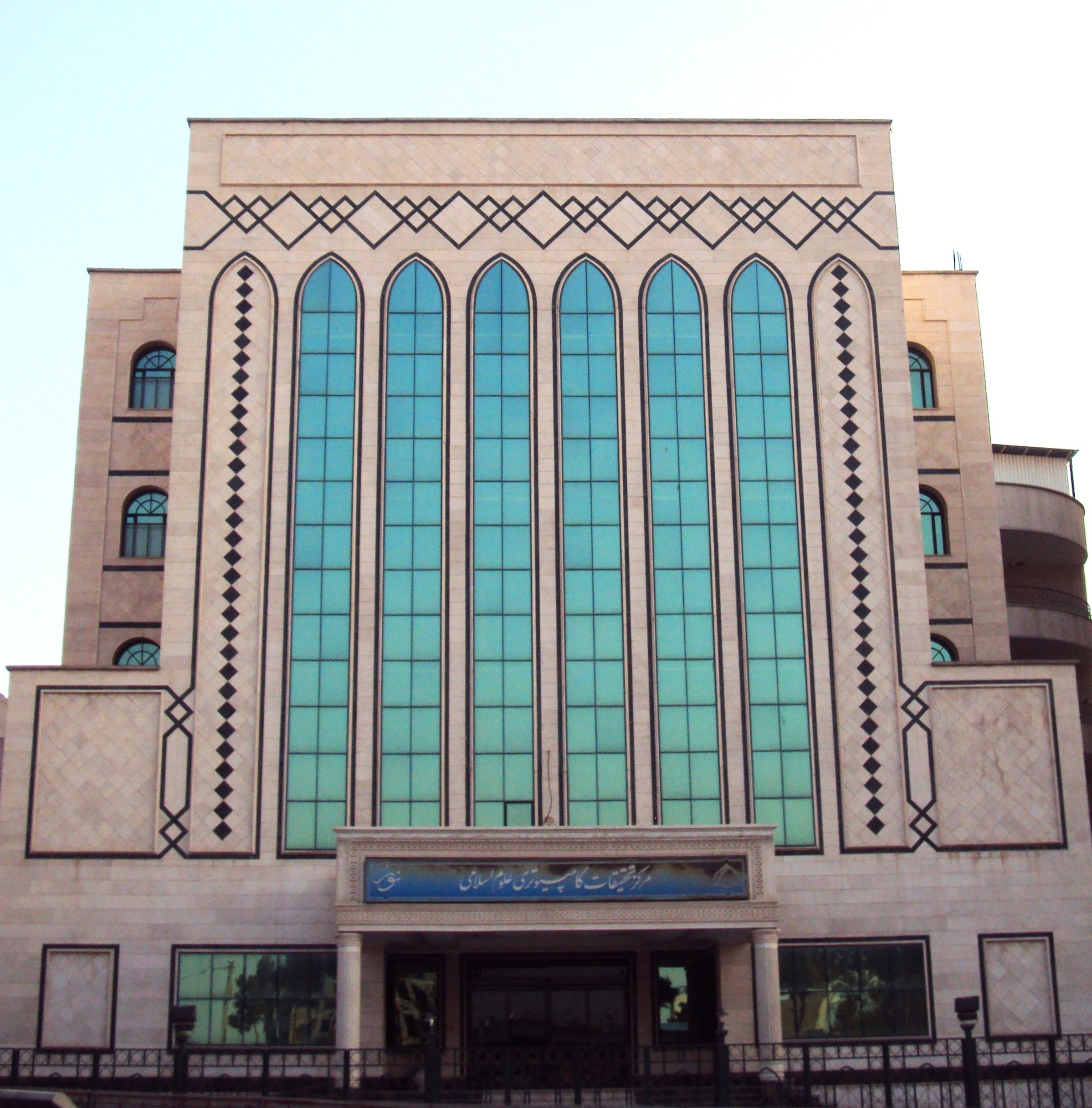
- Street view of the CRCIS in Qom, 2013
- Company type: Public

The Computer Research Center of Islamic Sciences (CRCIS, also known as Noor and Noorsoft, مرکز تحقیقات کامپیوتری علوم اسلامی) was established in 1989 with the aim of digitizing Islamic science resources at the suggestion of Ayatollah Ali Khamenei, the leader of the Islamic Republic of Iran.

The Computer Research Center of Islamic Sciences operates in Qom and has branches in Tehran, Isfahan and Mashhad for training and distribution. It has four departments, Department of Commerce and Cultural Services, Research Department, Technical Department, Production Deputy, Tehran Deputy, Administrative and Financial Deputy, as well as the Office of International Communications and Project Management Bureau.

The CRCIS has been established to facilitate access to Islamic science and religious culture resources and texts by means of information and communication technology, and to expand and expand it in the domains of theology and domestic and international cultural communities. Therefore, it offers, among others the Noormags website. It also created an online Quran with 30 translations and around 1000 exegesis, called Jami al-tafsir.
