= Jami al-tafsir =

Jami al-tafsir, also spelled as Jame Tafasir, is a multimedia software produced by the Noor Computer Research Center of Islamic Sciences. It is a tafsir in the form of an encyclopedia of the Qur'an.

The Jame Tafasir contains an exhibition of complete texts of 184 commentaries of different Islamic sects in 1225 volumes such as: Min Wahy al-Qur`an, al-Tebyan Fi Tasfir al-Qur`an, Noor al-Thaqalain, Kashful Asrar wa Edatol Abrar, Tafsir al-Qur`an al-Karim, al-Amthal Fi Tafsir al-Ketab al-Munzal, al-Mizan Fi Tafsir al-Qur`an from Muhammad Husayn Tabatabaei, Tafsir Nemouneh, Majma’ al-Bayan Fi Tafsir al-Qur`an, Tafsir Rawdh al-Jinan and Tafsir Beidhawi.

The aim of the software is to provide content and options to simplify the research path for researchers of Islamic sciences and Qur'anic scholars.
