= The Willow Tree (2005 film) =

- Film poster
- Directed by: Majid Majidi
- Written by: Majid Majidi; Fouad Nahas; Nasser Hashemzadeh
- Produced by: Majid Majidi
- Starring: Parviz Parastui; Roya Taymourian; Afarin Obeisi; Mohamad Reza Amir Naji
- Cinematography: Mahmoud Kalari; Bahram Badakshani; Mohammad Davudi
- Edited by: Hassan Hassandoost
- Music by: Ahmad Pejman
- Release date: 11 August 2005
- Running time: 96 minutes
- Country: Iran
- Language: Persian
- Box office: $25,525

The Willow Tree (Persian: بید مجنون, translit. Bid-e Majnoon) is a 2005 Iranian film directed by Majid Majidi. It tells the story of Youssef, a man blinded in a fireworks accident, when eight years old. After an operation he regains his vision, changing his life in unexpected ways. It was filmed from 10 February 2004 – 10 August 2004 in both Tehran and Paris.

It was released in the United States on August 3, 2007.

== Cast ==
- Parviz Parastui as Youssef
- Roya Taymourian as Roya
- Afarin Obeisi as Mother
- Mohammad Amir Naji as Morteza
- Melika Eslafi as Mariam
- Leila Otadi as Pari
- Mahmoud Behraznia as Mahmood
- Ebrahim Otadi as Mehdi

== Reception ==
On review aggregator Rotten Tomatoes, the film holds an approval rating of 87% based on 15 reviews. On Metacritic, the film has a weighted average score of 74 out of 100, based on four critics, indicating "generally favorable" reviews.
