= From Karkheh to Rhein =

- از کرخه تا راین
- Directed by: Ebrahim Hatamikia
- Written by: Ebrahim Hatamikia
- Starring: Ali Dehkordi; Homa Rousta; Heinz Neumann; Asghar Naghizadeh
- Cinematography: Mahmoud Kolari
- Edited by: Mohammadhosein Daroshafaee; Hosein Zandbaf
- Music by: Majid Entezami
- Production company: Sina Film
- Release date: 1993
- Running time: 93 minutes
- Countries: Iran; Germany
- Languages: Persian; German

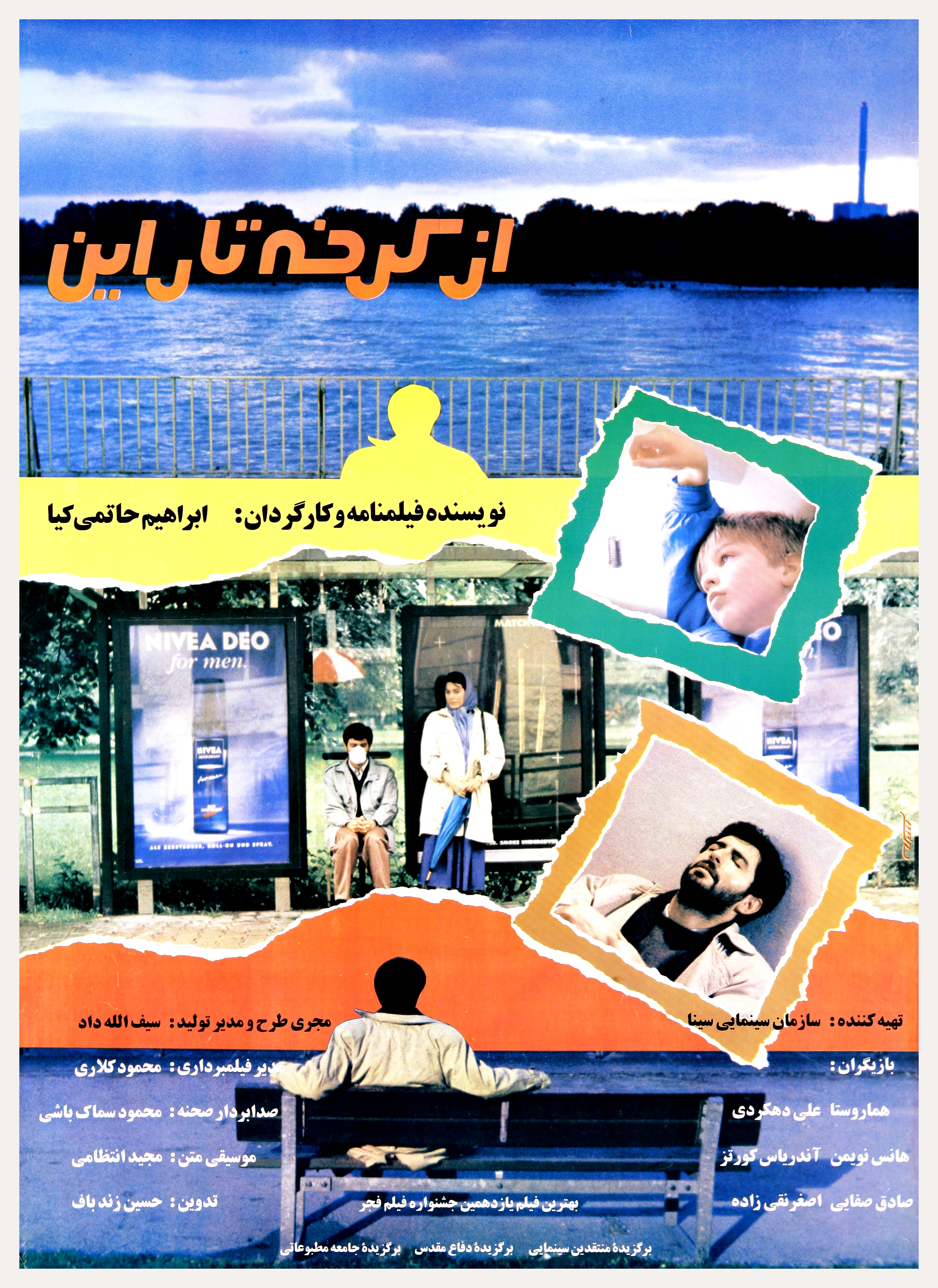
Film poster

From Karkheh to Rhein (Persian: از کرخه تا راین, romanized: Az Karkheh tā Rāīn) is a 1993 Iranian film written and directed by Ebrahim Hatamikia, starring Ali Dehkordi and Homa Rousta.

The film is the first German-Iranian co-production.

== Plot ==
Saeed is an Iran–Iraq war victim of chemical weapons who heads to Germany for eye surgery and comes across his sister, Leila, who has been living in Cologne with her husband and son, Jonas, for many years. Saeed gets his sight back after the surgery and tries to cope with the new and strange atmosphere around him. Saeed is getting ready to return to Iran when further examinations show that he has leukemia. His disease has apparently resulted from chemical gases used by Iraq and sold by Germany in the 1980-1988 war.

When Saeed's sister finds out about his disease, she tries to prevent any situation that will cause him stress, as the doctors advised. But Saeed becomes very ill when he watches the video of the funeral of Iran's revolutionary leader Ayatollah Khomeini, which was recorded by his brother-in-law. So, they take him to the hospital and he dies there while undergoing chemotherapy. This happens while Saeed's wife and his newly born baby are coming to Germany to meet him. The last scene of the film shows that the family of Saeed's sister is going back to Iran with his wife.

== Cast ==
- Ali Dehkordi as Saeed
- Homa Rusta as Leila
- Heinz Neumann as Leila's Husband
- Asghar Naghizadeh as Basiji
- Sadegh Safayi as Basiji
- Farzaneh Asgari
- Parviz Sheikhtadi
- Noorbert Hanzing
- Nikel Gril
- Andreas Kurtz
- Majid Safavi

== Soundtrack ==
The music of the film was written and performed by Iranian composer Majid Entezami who later had collaboration with Hatamikia in The Glass Agency and The Scent of Joseph's Coat.

=== Track listing ===
Az Karkheh ta Rhein (Original Motion Picture Soundtrack)

Soundtrack album by Majid Entezami
- Released: 1993
- Length: 50:22

No.	Title	Artist(s)	Length
1.	"Loneliness"	Majid Entezami	1:33
2.	"From Karkheh"	Majid Entezami	6:48
3.	"Misgiving"	Majid Entezami	0:48
4.	"First Meeting"	Majid Entezami	2:39
5.	"Pain and Heart"	Majid Entezami	1:06
6.	"Remoteness"	Majid Entezami	1:00
7.	"Another Birth"	Majid Entezami	3:19
8.	"Unwanted News"	Majid Entezami	0:52
9.	"Laila"	Majid Entezami	2:37
10.	"Anxiety"	Majid Entezami	2:29
11.	"Present"	Majid Entezami	1:13
12.	"Whisper 1"	Majid Entezami	4:17
13.	"Battle Front"	Majid Entezami	3:07
14.	"Grief"	Majid Entezami	2:12
15.	"In Search Of The Sound"	Majid Entezami	0:52
16.	"Farwell With Companions 1"	Majid Entezami	1:26
17.	"Apprehension"	Majid Entezami	2:47
18.	"Whisper 2"	Majid Entezami	4:16
19.	"Sudden News"	Majid Entezami	2:21
20.	"Revelation"	Majid Entezami	1:16
21.	"Farwell With Companions 2"	Majid Entezami	1:16
22.	"Valiants"	Majid Entezami	0:51
23.	"Eternity"	Majid Entezami	1:17

== See also ==
- Karkheh, a river in Khuzestan Province, which was affected the most during the war
- Disabled Iranian veterans

== Exiternal links ==
- From Karkheh to Rhein at IMDb
- From Karkheh to Rhein on SourehCinema (in Persian)
