= Apartment No. 13 =

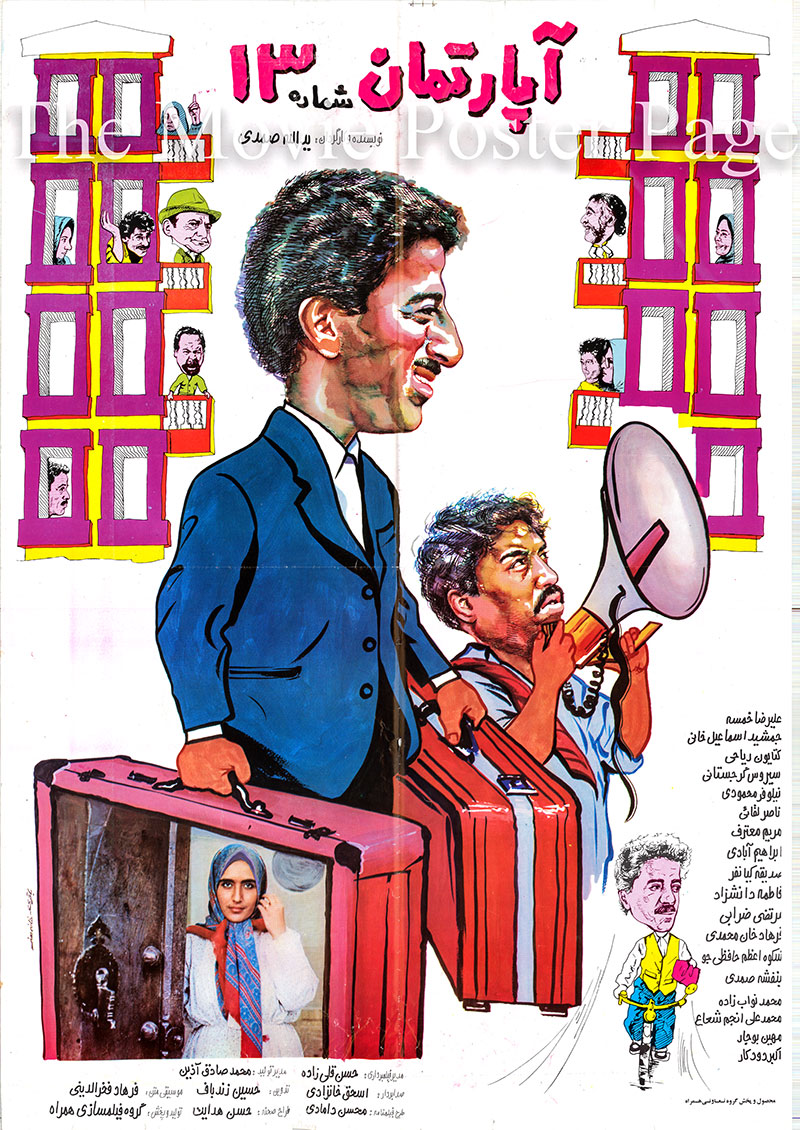
Apartment number 13 Movie Poster

Apartment No. 13 (Persian: آپارتمان شماره ۱۳) is a 1991 film by the Iranian director Yadollah Samadi. It was written by Hassan Gholizadeh and Ali Reza Khamseh, and starred Ebrahim Abadi, Akbar Doodkar and Jamshid Esmailkhani. It won the Crystal Simorgh for best film.
