= Parviz Parastui =

Iranian actor

- پرویز پرستویی
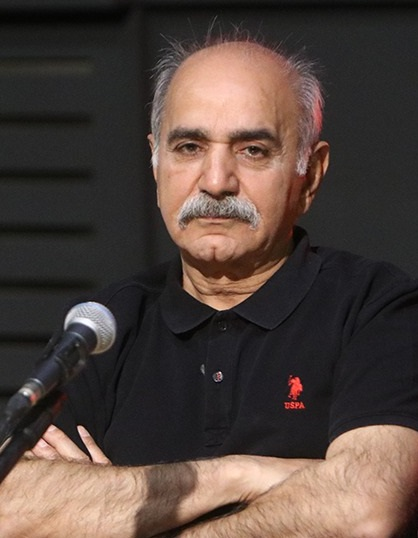
- Parastui in 2020
- Born: 24 June 1955 (age 71); Kabudrahang, Hamedan, Imperial Iran
- Occupation: Actor
- Years active: 1984–present
- Spouse: Nastaran Parastui (m. 1981)
- Children: 2

Parviz Parastui (Persian: پرویز پرستویی; born 24 June 1955) is an Iranian actor. He has received various accolades, including four Crystal Simorgh for Best Actor–making him the only actor to have four wins in that category–four Hafez Awards, two Iran Cinema Celebration Awards and an Iran's Film Critics and Writers Association Awards.

== Early life ==
Parviz Parastui was born in Kabudrahang, Hamadan province. He served in the Iran-Iraq war. He worked in judicature before becoming an actor. He began his career by starring in the film Diar-e Asheghan. Following Diare Asheghan, Parastui began a long lasting career in films.

== Career ==
=== Film ===
After starring in films such as Pishtazan-e Fath, Hunting, etc., Parviz Parastui acted as "Sadeq Meshkini", a comedy role in the highly acclaimed yet controversial movie Leily Is with Me directed by Kamal Tabrizi. The war film Leily Is with Me brought a new perspective to the Iran–Iraq War which up to then was viewed as taboo material. The movie tells the comical story of a war-fearing employee of Iranian Television Broadcasting unknowingly advancing straight to enemy lines, while actually trying to flee the war when he is assigned to accompany a director to a city close to enemy lines to film a documentary piece. Since then, Parastui has expanded his presence as a comedy film actor by starring in other revolutionary comedy films.

Parviz Parastui also starred in war films such as The Red Ribbon, The Glass Agency, and Dead Wave. Ebrahim Hatamikia directed most of Parastui's war films. Parviz Parastui had been known as a comedian with playing roles in The Snowman, The Glass Love, Marde Avazi before he played a role in the satire film The Lizard, another work by Kamal Tabrizi. He gained major popularity and fame after playing in Marmoulak as "Reza Marmoulak". Parastui in The Willow Tree, Majid Majidi the role of "Joseph", Performance was brilliant. Today, Reza Mirkarimi latest Movie of Important He is.

=== Television ===
Parastui's TV works include series such as: The Apartment, The Martyr of Kufa, The Red Soil, Under the Pillory and The Chef.

He was awarded the Best Actor title in International TV Programs Rome Festival for playing in Under the Pillory. He also plays the lead role in The Accomplice series.

=== Music ===
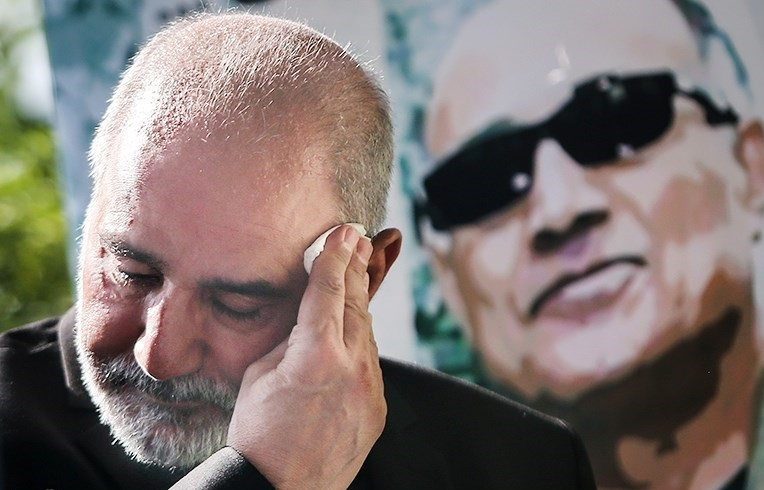
Parastui in Kiarostami Funeral

Besides acting in movies and on stage, Parastui is a singer and so far has recorded three albums. His first album called Daddy (Persian: بابایی) was released in 2006 and his second album Im Parviz Parastui (Persian: من پرویز پرستویی هستم) was released in 2013. Parastui's most recent album, I'm an Actor (Persian: من یک بازیگرم), was released in 2014.

== Filmography ==
Year	Title	Role	Director	Notes
1983	Land of Lovers		Hassan Karbakhsh Ravari	Honorary Diploma Best Supporting Actor Fajr International Film Festival
1984	Conquest Vanguards		Naser Mohammadipour	
1987	Secret Agency		Hassan Javanbakhsh	
1988	Hunting		Majid Javanmard	
1990	The Adventures of that Fortunate Man		Reza Heydarnejad	
1991	The Snake		Majid Javanmard	
1992	Imam Ali		Davoud Mirbagheri	
1995	The Snowman		Davoud Mirbagheri	
1996	Leily Is with Me		Kamal Tabrizi	Honorary Diploma Best Actor Fajr International Film Festival
1996	The voice of the Cuckoo		Bahman Zarin	
1997	Under the Umbrella of the Sun		Bahman Zarrinpour	
1997	Motherly Love		Kamal Tabrizi	
1997	The Mad		Dariush Farhang	
1997	The Glass Agency		Ebrahim Hatamikia	Crystal Simorgh Best Actor Fajr International Film Festival; Statue Best Actor Celebration House of Cinema; Best Actor International Festival of Ethnological Film; Best Actor Moqavemat Film Festival; Hafez Award Best Actor
1997	The Changed Man		Mohammad Reza Honarmand	
1999	The Red Ribbon		Ebrahim Hatamikia	
1999	Joking		Homayoun Assadian	
2000	The Glass Love		Reza Heydarnejad	
2000	Mummy III		Mohammad Reza Honarmand	
2001	The Dead Wave		Ebrahim Hatamikia	
2001	Water & Fire		Fereydoun Jeyrani	
2001	The Red Soil		Ebrahim Hatamikia	
2002	I'm not winded		Mohammad Reza Honarmand	Hafez Award Best Actor
2002	One Flew Over the Cukoo's Nest		Ahmadreza Motamedi	
2003	Banooye Man		Yadollah Samadi	
2004	Duel		Ahmad Reza Darvish	
2005	Café Transit		Kambuzia Partovi	Special Jury Award International Film Festival of Kerala
2005	The Willow Tree		Majid Majidi	Crystal Simorgh Best Actor Fajr International Film Festival
2006	In the Name of the Father		Ebrahim Hatamikia	Crystal Simorgh Best Actor Fajr International Film Festival; Hafez Award Best Actor
2006	Under the Pillory		Mohammad Reza Honarmand	Best Actor Award International TV Programs Rome Festival
2006	Fans		Mohammad Rahmanian	Best Actor Award Theatre Critics Society
2007	Reward of Silence		Maziar Miri	
2007	Miss Iran		Saman Moghaddam	
2008	The Book of Law		Maziar Miri	
2008	Twenty		Abdolreza Kahani	Best Actor Award Batumi International Art-House Film Festival
2010	Thirteen 59		Saman Salur	
2010	Bear		Khosro Masumi	
2011	Ziba and I		Fereydoun Hassanpour	Best Actor Award Iranian Film Festival in Canada
2013	We Guests		Mohammad Mehdi Asgarpour	
2014	Bidari Baraye Se Rooz		Masoud Amini	
2014	Buffalo		Kaveh Sajjadi	
2015	Two		Soheila Golestani	
2017	House of Paper	Amirali	Mehdi Sabbaghzadeh	

=== Film ===
Year	Title	Role	Director	Notes	Ref(s)
2004	The Lizard	Reza Mesghali	Kamal Tabrizi		
2014	Today	Younes	Reza Mirkarimi		
2016	Bodyguard	Heidar Zabihi	Ebrahim Hatamikia		
2017	Domestic Killer	Jalal Soroush	Masoud Kimiaee		
2018	Los Angeles, Tehran	Behrouz	Tina Pakravan		
2019	The Singer	Ebrahim Khoshlahn	Mostafa Kiaee		
2021	Majority	Amir	Mohsen Gharaee		

=== Web ===
Year	Title	Role	Director	Platform	Notes	Ref(s)
2020	The Accomplice	Fariborz Sabouri	Mostafa Kiaee	Filimo, Namava	Main role	
TBA	The Hunting Ground		Nima Javidi		Main role	

== Awards and nominations ==
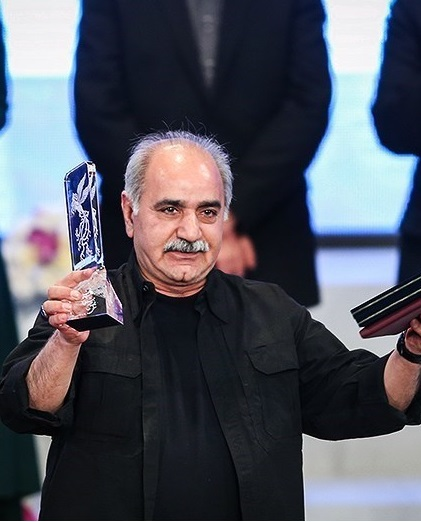

he received numerous accolades throughout his career spanned, including four Crystal Simorgh for Best Actor, making him the first and only actor to have four wins in that category
