= Homa Rousta =

Iranian actress (1946–2015)

- هما روستا
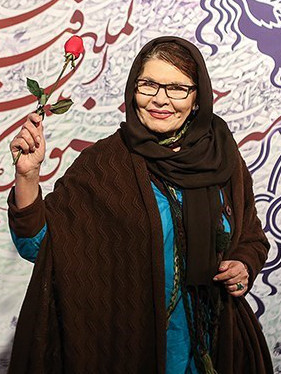
- Rousta at the 32nd Fajr Film Festival
- Born: 26 September 1946; Tehran, Iran
- Died: 26 September 2015 (aged 69); Los Angeles, California, United States
- Resting place: 88 Segment, Behesht-e Zahra Cemetery
- Education: Tehran University of Art; Bucharest School of Dramatic Arts
- Occupation: Actress
- Years active: 1971–2015
- Notable work: From Karkheh to Rhine
- Spouse: Hamid Samandarian (m. 1972; died 2012)
- Children: 1
- Father: Reza Rousta

Homa Rousta (Persian: هما روستا; 26 September 1946 – 26 September 2015) was an Iranian film and stage actress. She was the widow of stage director Hamid Samandarian.

She graduated with a degree in theatre from the School of Dramatic Arts in Bucharest. She started her career in 1971. Her most famous performance was in From Karkheh to Rhine (1992), for which she was nominated for the best actress Simorgh at the Fajr Film Festival.

She died of cancer on 26 September 2015 in a hospital in Los Angeles, California, United States. Her body was transferred to Iran and was buried at Behesht Zahra alongside her husband's grave.

== Selected filmography ==
Year	Film
1986	Report on a Murder / Gozaresh yek ghatl
1987	The Little Bird of Happiness / Parandeyeh koochake khoshbakhti
1989	All the Temptations of the Earth
1990	Tigh-e aftab
1990	Malek Khatoon
1991	Travellers
1992	Do hamsafar
1992	From Karkheh to Rhine / Az Karkheh ta Rhein
2001	Legion
2002	Sarzamine Madari

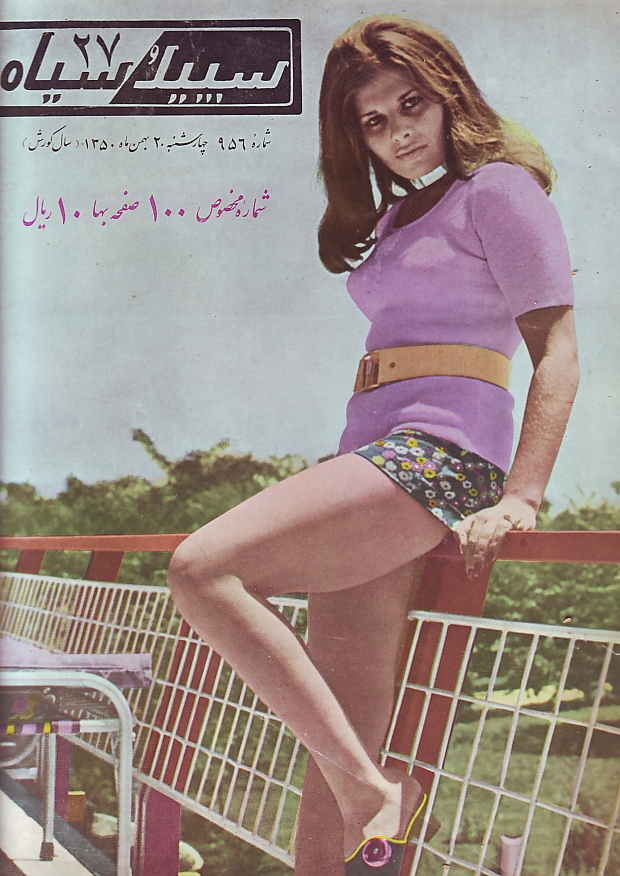
Homa Rousta on the cover of White & Black magazine, Iran, February 1972
