= Noormags =

Website offering Islamic journals

- Website type: A database for articles of specialized magazines
- Available in: Persian Arabic English
- Owner: Computer Research Center of Islamic Sciences (CRCIS)
- Website: Noormags
- Registration: Yes
- Launched: 2005; 21 years ago
- Current status: Active

Noor Specialized Magazines (Persian: نورمگز) is a website founded and administered by Computer Research Center of Islamic Sciences (CRCIS) that offers digitized versions of specialized journals concerning Islamic studies, social sciences and the humanities.

== History ==
=== Backgrounds ===
Accompanied by the rapid development of internet networks around the world, the idea of creating electronic journals bore fruit instantly, so that 110 titles of electronic publications and newsletters in 1991 increased to 1689 titles in 1996 and over 4070 titles in 1997, according to the statistics released by Association of Research Libraries (ARL). On these lines publications and websites providing articles took different approaches to present their publications on the Internet. Some websites attempted to offer references of articles, some published digital texts of articles, some others offered images taken from physical copies of journals instead of textual files and others, like Noor Specialized Magazines Website (Noormags) as the first website working with this method, presented journals in full text and full image.

=== Inception ===
Noor Specialized Magazines Website (Noormags) is a website affiliated to the Computer Research Center of Islamic Sciences (CRCIS). As the largest Islamic bank of specialized journals concerning Islamic sciences, social sciences and the humanities in cyberspace, Noormags was founded in September 2005 with the aim of facilitating and promoting research and producing knowledge. Its user interface has been so far updated several times to keep pace with new technologies. The basic idea of establishing the website originated from the successful experience of presenting religious journals in Hawzah website. The increasing enthusiasm expressed by users and the experts’ growing need to new capabilities led the CRCIS to launch Noormags to meet their needs.

=== Summary of activities ===
2003: Performing the feasibility study and website analysis phases

2004: Designing and implementing the website

2005: Official opening of the website

2012: Launching version 1.5

2014: Launching version 2

== The Website Objectives ==
Creating the broadest and most comprehensive archive of journals and articles on Islamic sciences, social sciences and the humanities on the Internet is one of the main objectives for setting up such a website. Allowing researchers to have a quick and easy access to research resources, disseminating scientific information as well as accelerating scientific researches and preventing parallel researches are among other objectives of the website.

== Content ==
The journals on the website are categorized into twenty one subjects: social sciences, law, history, geography, economy, language and literature, political sciences, management, psychology, library and information sciences, art and architecture, philosophy and theology, the Qur'an and Hadith, Fiqh and usoul (Islamic jurisprudence and its principles), physical education, ethics, religions, educational sciences, accounting, health and interdisciplinary. The articles available on the website can be downloaded in both HTML and PDF formats in full text and full image.

== Services and features ==
Graphical and visual features of this website have undergone a lot of changes and improvements during the course of its activity. In addition, a lot of unique services and technical capabilities have been offered to users with versions 1.5 and 2.

=== Changes in version 1.5 ===
• Search and information retrieval: The most important change in this version occurred in the search section. Searching in titles of journals, articles of a specific journal and articles of a specific author, searching in the texts of articles, increased search filters and standard search simultaneously in articles and journals were new changes introduced in this version. • Extracting and providing citation files of articles: In this version, users were provided with citation files of articles in three standard formats as RIS, EndNote and BibTex. • Providing a brief statistics of articles by a specific author: Statistical categorization of articles by authors was made available to users. • Display of journals based on scientific rank and language: This feature helps researchers to learn about journals and their scientific ranks and therefore to make a more accurate selection of the required sources and materials. • Using front cover image for journal icons: front cover image was displayed as journal icons in Publication Info page, Article View page and the lists.

=== Changes in version 2 ===
==== A.Automation ====
===== Smart detection of related articles based on users’ visits =====
From the advent of this Website, many users have viewed and received these articles. Those who follow a particular topic in the website adopt various ways to search for it. The website can track the articles that a user views in one research task. If the number of times two articles are viewed at the same time is considerably large, it can be concluded that they are related to each other. This capability uses this method to let the user know about other articles that may be in some way related to the current one.

===== Smart detection of titles similar to that of the current article from among a huge mass of articles =====
This is a smart tool to discover the articles having titles most similar to that of the current article, taking advantage of text mining and artificial intelligence methods. Finding related articles is a research concern that must be answered in the shortest time available in order for researchers to organize comprehensive and non-repetitive research works. The main way to know the relationship of articles with each other is to check the common words in their titles. This tool uses the titles of articles to identify their relationship with one another.

===== Noormags exclusive search engine =====
A part of developing Noor local search engine has been embedded in the new Noormags website. Here are some features of the search engine: • Searching for all word forms: all derivations of the search word are included in search results. • Highlighting search results: the search results will be displayed highlighted through the texts. • Find synonyms: synonyms of the search word will be included in search results. • Spell checker: it checks the words typed onto the search input line and suggests their correct spelling if mistyped. Fast performance, quality of results considering the Persian language characteristics, logical ranking in comparison with popular search engines and many other facilities are accounted as the strength points of this search engine.

==== B. Providing publication owners with various services ====
• Assigning a specific address for each publication • Possibility of managing Publication Info page by the owners • Providing statistical information, e.g. number of visits, number of downloads etc. • Possibility of uploading publication files by owners

==== C. Research-orientation ====
• Creating a list of favorite articles, journals and authors • Releasing information on new issues and selected authors • Giving reports on users' activities including downloads, searches etc.

==== D. System integrity ====
•Integrating different services to provide the content purposefully and intelligently

Connecting to the comprehensive system of Noor Users

== Copyrights ==
Computer Research Center of Islamic Sciences has the required authorization from owners for all the journals published on the Website. Users can use materials on the Website for personal purposes; however, commercial or public use is subject to authorization from owners of journals and Computer Research Center of Islamic Sciences.

== Website statistics ==
According to the statistics released in 2012, the Website had published over 725,000 articles from 957 journals in 43,000 issues. As reported by the Website, these figures increased to 765,000 articles from 1,046 journals in 46,500 issues in March 2013 and to 900,000 articles from 1,420 magazines in 57,000 issues in the summer of 2015.

== Honors ==
This Website won in the Sixth Edition of National Digital Media Fair and Festival in the category “Online Media Websites” entitled General Cultural Portal - Culture and Knowledge.
