= Short Working Day =

- Theatrical release poster
- Directed by: Krzysztof Kieślowski
- Written by: Hanna Krall; Krzysztof Kieślowski
- Produced by: Jacek Szeligowski
- Starring: Wacław Ulewicz; Lech Grzmociński
- Cinematography: Krzysztof Pakulski
- Edited by: Elzbieta Kurkowska
- Music by: Jan Kanty Pawluśkiewicz
- Production company: Polish Television
- Release date: November 1995 (Thessaloniki International Film Festival)
- Running time: 73 minutes
- Country: Poland
- Language: Polish

Short Working Day (Polish: Krótki dzień pracy) is a Polish film directed by Krzysztof Kieślowski. Written by Kieślowski and Hanna Krall, the film is about the workers protests in June '76 in Radom, as seen from the perspective of the local Secretary of the Polish United Workers' Party. The film is based on real events, but the characters are fictional. Short Working Day was filmed in 1981, but did not have its official premiere until November 1995 at the Thessaloniki International Film Festival. During the intervening years, however, it was shown many times in film clubs and at special screenings.

== Plot ==
In 1968, a young man addresses a meeting of protesters by condemning the firebrands who are agitating the students. Eight years later, in Radom, Poland during the June 1976 protests, the young man is now the local First Secretary of the Communist Party (Wenceslaus Ulewicz). He is facing a mob of strikers protesting a 69 percent increase in food prices by the central government. Demonstrations in the industrial towns of Radom and Plock quickly lead to the beating and firing of thousands of workers. The party secretary tries to appease the crowds of workers massing beneath his window. Despite the growing threat, he decides to stick it out at the party's office instead of making the recommended hasty escape.

While the protesters become increasingly hostile in their calls for a repeal of the price increases, the party secretary remains strong outwardly in his speeches. With bullhorn in hand, he believes he can talk and reason with the protesters. When he is alone, however, he seems lost in his private thoughts and fears. As the morning passes, the secretary becomes increasingly vulnerable because the central government refuses to yield to the protesters' demands. By the afternoon, the party secretary finally yields to the police chief's orders that he leave his office. As the secretary exits the building, the protesters set fire to his office furniture.

Five years later, the same secretary is on television explaining his actions during the June 1976 protests.

== Cast ==
- Wacław Ulewicz as provincial Communist Party secretary in Radom
- Lech Grzmociński as commander of the Police
- Tadeusz Bartosik as an activist trying to negotiate with the party crowd
- Elżbieta Kijowska
- Mirosław Siedler as activist of the Workers' Defence Committee trying to help the families of detainees
- Zbigniew Bielski as striker, then activist of Solidarity
- Paul Nowisz as official car driver of the secretary
- Wojciech Pilarski as Judge
- Mark Kepinski as Party's office secretary in Radom

== Bibliography ==
- Insdorf, Annette (1999). Double Lives, Second Chances: The Cinema of Krzysztof Kieślowski. New York: Hyperion. ISBN 0786865628.
- Kieślowski, Krzysztof (1998). Stok, Danusia (ed.). Kieślowski on Kieślowski. London: Faber and Faber. ISBN 0571173284.
