= The Glass Agency =

- International poster
- Directed by: Ebrahim Hatamikia
- Written by: Ebrahim Hatamikia
- Produced by: Varahonar; Farabi Cinema Foundation
- Starring: Parviz Parastui; Reza Kianian; Habib Rezaei; Bita Badran
- Cinematography: Aziz Saati
- Edited by: Hayedeh Safiyari
- Music by: Majid Entezami
- Release dates: 1 February 1998 (Fajr); 8 July 1998 (Iran); 19 February 1999 (BIFF)
- Running time: 114 minutes
- Country: Iran
- Language: Persian

The Glass Agency (Persian: آژانس شیشه‌ای) is a 1998 Iranian drama film written and directed by Ebrahim Hatamikia. It is one of Hatamikia's most successful works and one of the most popular and controversial films of post-revolutionary Iranian cinema.

One of the many Hatamikia films of the Sacred Defense cinema genre, The Glass Agency focuses on the Iran–Iraq War's impact on various aspects of Iranian society. The Glass Agency is set in a travel agency where an armed veteran takes hostages after failing to raise enough money for his injured comrade to travel abroad for medical treatment. The film candidly reveals some of the major fault lines in Iranian society today. With its complex message of sympathy for the veterans and criticism of those who exploit their status for political purposes, the film has won praise from conservatives and reformists alike.

== Plot ==
Two veterans of the Iran-Iraq war, Abbas and his wartime commander Kazem, are the main protagonists of the film. Abbas comes to Tehran to seek medical treatment for a war injury. Kazem wants to help Abbas, as the doctor recommends that he go abroad for the operation. However, it is almost New Year's Eve, and arranging a flight becomes difficult. Kazem is suffering from hegemony, which is seen in the postwar society. The problems they encounter make Kazem lose his temper, and he ends up taking a whole travel agency hostage.

== Cast ==
- Parviz Parastui as Haj Kazem
- Reza Kianian as Salahshoor
- Habib Rezaei as Abbas Heydari
- Bita Badran as Narges
- Asghar Naghizadeh as Asghar
- Ghasem Zareh as Ahmad Kuhi
- Behrouz Shoeibi as Salam
- Farshid Zarei Fard as Agency Manager
- Majid Moshiri
- Ezzatollah Mehravaran
- Nasrin Nakisa
- Mehrdad Falahatgar
- Mohammad Hatami
- Sadegh Safai

== Reception ==
=== Accolades ===
At the 16th Fajr International Film Festival, The film won both Best Film and Audience Choice of Best Film, making it the first film in The history of cinema of Iran to win the latter. The Glass Agency also won nine Crystal Simorgh awards and a Diploma Honorary, including:

- Best Film
- Best Director (Ebrahim Hatamikia)
- Best Screenplay (Ebrahim Hatamikia)
- Best Actor (Parviz Parastui)
- Best Supporting Actor (Reza Kianian)
- Best Supporting Actor Diploma Honorary (Habib Rezaei)
- Best Supporting Actress (Bita Badran)
- Best Original Score (Majid Entezami)
- Best Editor (Hayedeh Safiyari)
- Audience Choice of Best Film

and It was nominated in four other categories, including:

- Best Cinematography (Aziz Saati)
- Best Sound Editing (Mohsen Roshan)
- Best Makeup (Mehrdad Mirkyani)
- Best Production Design (Hamidreza Charkchyan)
