= Fatemeh Motamed-Arya =

Iranian actress (born 1961)

- فاطمه معتمدآریا
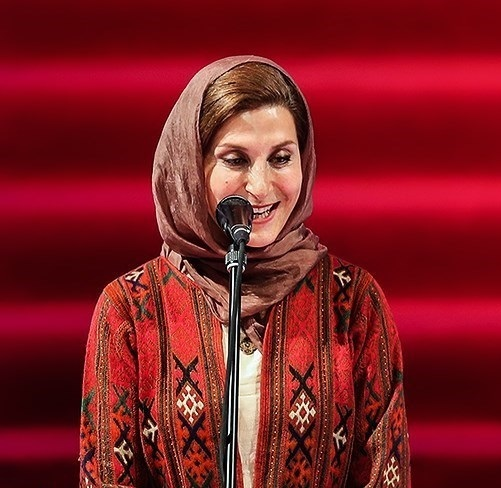
- Motamed-Arya in Tehran 2017
- Born: Simin Motamed-Arya; 29 October 1961 (age 64); Tehran, Iran
- Occupation: Actress
- Years active: 1981–present
- Spouse: Ahmad Hamed (m. 1981)
- Children: 1
- Website: www.motamedarya.com

Fatemeh Motamed-Arya (Persian: فاطمه معتمدآریا; born October 29, 1961 in Tehran) is an Iranian actress. She first got involved in theater during her teen years, and received her degree in theater from Tehran Art Institute. She is one of the most significant actresses of post-revolutionary Iranian cinema and has been called "one of the most important actresses and filmmakers of Iran." She has been nominated ten times for the best actress award at the Fajr International Film Festival and won the Crystal Simorgh four times.

== Selected filmography ==
- Reyhaneh (1989)
- Nassereddin Shah, Actor-e Cinema (1992 - a.k.a. Once Upon a Time, Cinema)
- Mosaferan (1992 - a.k.a. Travelers)
- Honarpisheh (1993 - a.k.a. The Actor)
- Hamsar (1994 - a.k.a. Spouse)
- Rusari Abi (1995 - a.k.a. The Blue Veiled)
- Kolah Ghermezi and Pesar Khaleh (1995)
- Mard-e Avazi (1998)
- Once Upon a Time (1999)
- Eynak-e doodi (2000)
- Azizam man kook nistam (2002)
- Kolah Ghermezi Va Sarvenaz (2002)
- Abadan (2003)
- Gilaneh (2004)
- Taghato' (2005 - a.k.a. Crossroads)
- A Little Kiss (2005)
- Men at Work (2006)
- Zir-e Derakht-e Holou (2006)
- Zire Tigh (2006 - TV Series)
- Shirin (2007)
- Niloofar (2007-8)
- Mizak (2008)
- Ashpazbashi (2009 - TV Series)
- Khabe Leila (2010)
- Here Without Me (2011)
- Saad Saal Be In Salha (2011)
- Tales (2014)
- Nabat (2014)
- African Violet (2019)
- No Choice (2020)

== Awards and honors ==
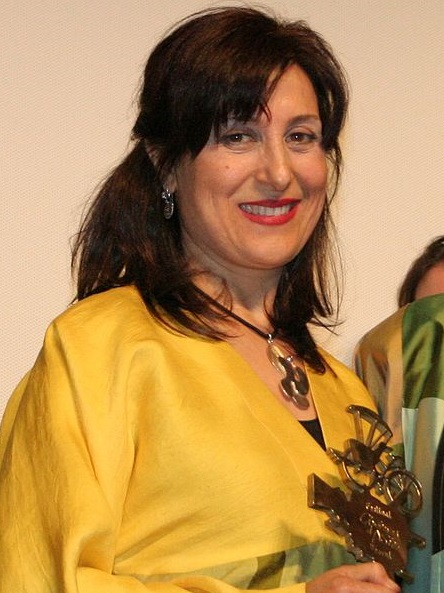
Motamed-Arya in Vesoul International Film Festival of Asian Cinema (2010)

- Nominated Crystal Simorgh, Best Supporting Role Actress in 6th Fajr Film Festival, 1988, for Jahizieh Baraye Robab
- Winner Crystal Simorgh, Best Supporting Role Actress in 7th Fajr Film Festival, 1989, for Barahoot
- Nominated Crystal Simorgh, Best Actress in 8th Fajr Film Festival, 1990, for Reihaneh
- Winner Crystal Simorgh, Best Actress in 10th Fajr Film Festival, 1992, for Mosaferan
- Winner Crystal Simorgh, Best Actress in 11th Fajr Film Festival, 1993, for Yekbar Baraye Hamisheh
- Winner Crystal Simorgh, Best Actress in 12th Fajr Film Festival, 1994, for Hamsar
- Nominated Crystal Simorgh, Best Actress in 13th Fajr Film Festival, 1995, for The Blue-Veiled
- Nominated Best Actress Award in 2nd House of Cinema, 1998, for The Changed Man
- Nominated Best Supporting Role Actress Award in 3rd House of Cinema, 1999, for Eshgh Bealaveh do, Shokhi
- Nominated Crystal Simorgh, Best Actress in 18th Fajr Film Festival, 2000, for Eshgh Bealaveh do
- Nominated Best Supporting Role Actress Award in 4th House of Cinema, 2000, for Through Sunglasses
- Nominated Best Actress Award in 6th House of Cinema, 2003, for Pastry Girl
- Nominated Crystal Simorgh, Best Actress in 22nd Fajr Film Festival, 2004, for Gilaneh
- Nominated Best Actress Award in 12th House of Cinema, 2008, for Saad Saal Be In Salha
- Winner Best Actress Award in 15th House of Cinema, 2011, for Here Without Me
- Montreal World Film Festival Best Actress prize for her role in the Iranian film Here Without Me 2011
- Prix Henri-Langlois for Actress and Cinema of the World 2012

== Political views ==
Fatemeh Motamed-Arya was invited to travel to Los Angeles as part of a film seminar series on Iranian films. It was reported that Iran barred Motamed-Arya and another filmmaker from leaving Iran because of their political activities.

After receiving the Prix de Henri-Langlois 2012 award, at the ceremony, Motamed-Arya said, “Tonight we have a common reason for being together. Without thinking about our homeland or mother tongue, we share peace and beauty here and take our portion. Cinema taught us love, kindness and sharing of this life. To remember that despite our language, color and religion we love each other as human beings.”

== Personal life ==
She is married to film producer and script writer Ahmad-Ali Hamed. Her son, Nariman Hamed is also a filmmaker based in New York.

=== Charity ===
In 2020 Fatemeh Motamed Aria, was appointed the "Ambassador of Mental Health" by the Iranian Scientific Association of Psychiatrists and the UNESCO Chair of Health Education.

She is the public face and endorser of the[Iranian Diabetes Information Association.

Motamed Arya is public face and endorser of the Autism Association of Iran, as well as Behnam Daheshpour charity.

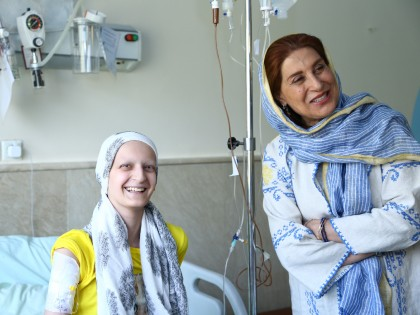

She is an active member and public face and endorser of Mahak Society to support children with cancer and the biggest charity in Iran.

Fatemeh Motamed-Arya was selected as the ambassador of the Mehrafarin Charity Society during a ceremony on March 3, 2008, at the Niavaran Cultural Center, as well as World Food Program (WFP).
