= Mohammad-Reza Honarmand =

Iranian film director and producer

Mohammad Reza Honarmand
- محمدرضا هنرمند
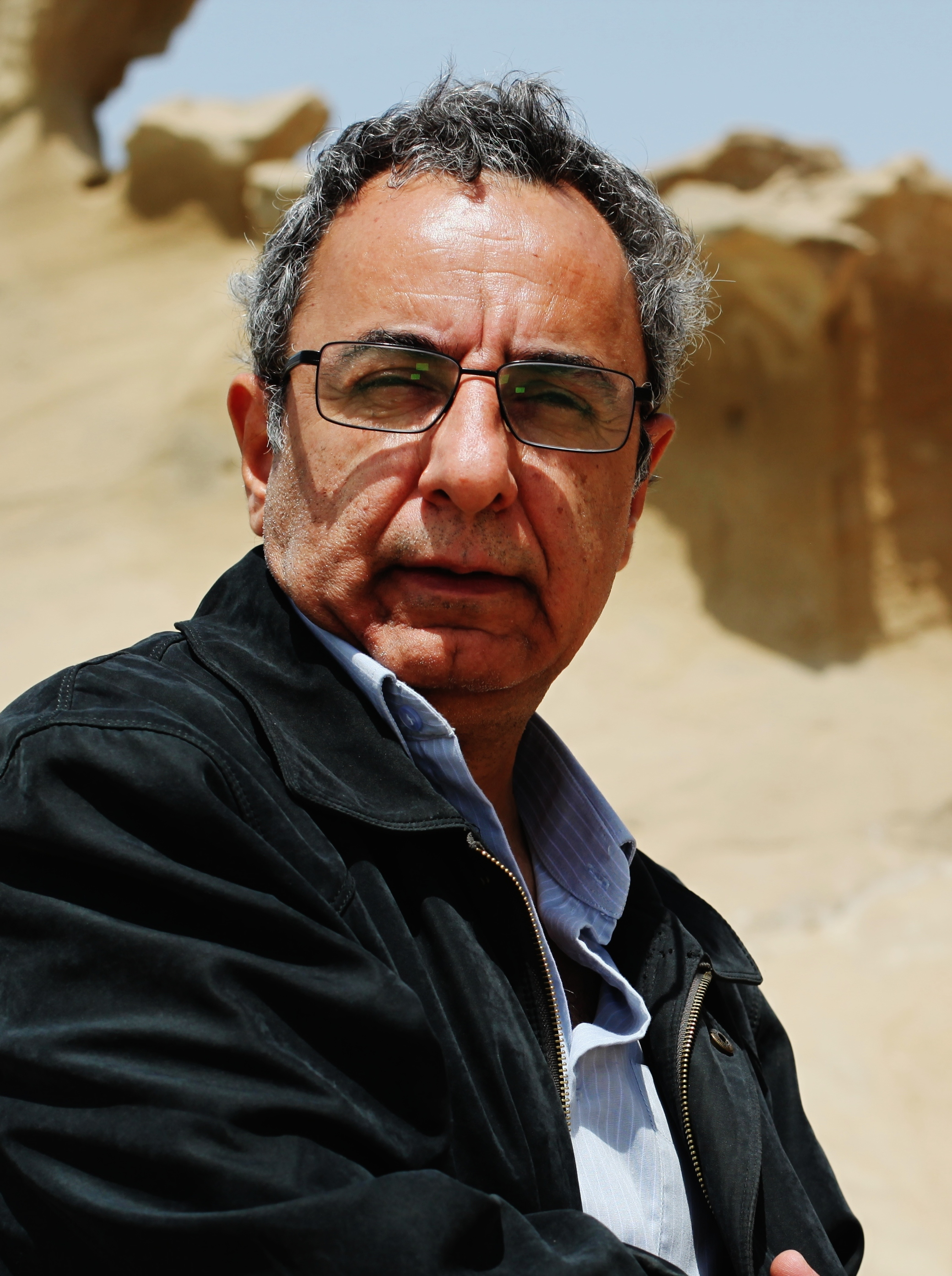
- Born: 1955 (age 69–70); Tehran, Iran
- Occupation(s): Director, producer, screenwriter
- Years active: 1982–present

Mohammad Reza Honarmand (Persian: محمدرضا هنرمند; born 1955) is an Iranian film director, screenwriter, and producer.

== Directing in Cinema ==
Honarmand has directed films in various genres. In Dozd-e arousak-ha, he experienced a film with an attractive content that was for children.
In 1994 he made a war film named Didar. Mehran Modiri (one of the most famous comedy directors in Iran) acted his first cinema role there. Since then, Honarmand came to comedy films. Mard-e avazi and Moomiyaee 3 are two comedy films by him.
Mard-e avazi (Starring Parviz Parastui) became a successful film among the people of Iran at its time.

== Activities in TV ==
Mohammad-Reza Honarmand is also active in TV. His comedy-political TV series Cactus (Persian: کاکتوس) was praised by Iraninian critics.
Zir-e tigh is the name of Honarmand's last work. In this festival, Mohammad Reza Honarmand won the award of the best director for TV programs for Zir-e tigh .

== Filmography as Director ==
=== Cinema ===
- 1982: Marg-e digari (in English : Another Death)
- 1984: Gourkan (The Badger)
- 1985: Zang-ha (The Rings)
- 1987: Radd-e pa-yi bar shen (Footprint on the Sand)
- 1989: Dozd-e arousak-ha (Dolls Thief)
- 1994: Didar (The Visit)
- 1999: Mard-e avazi (The Wrong Man)
- 2000: Moomiyaee 3 (Mummy III)
- 2002: Azizam man kook nistam (Honey, I am not winded)
- 2019: Symphony No. 9

=== TV Series ===
- Cactus 1, 2 and 3
- 2007: Zir-e tigh (Under the Blade)
- 2009: Ashpazbashi (The Chef)
