= Grand Cinema =

1989 film

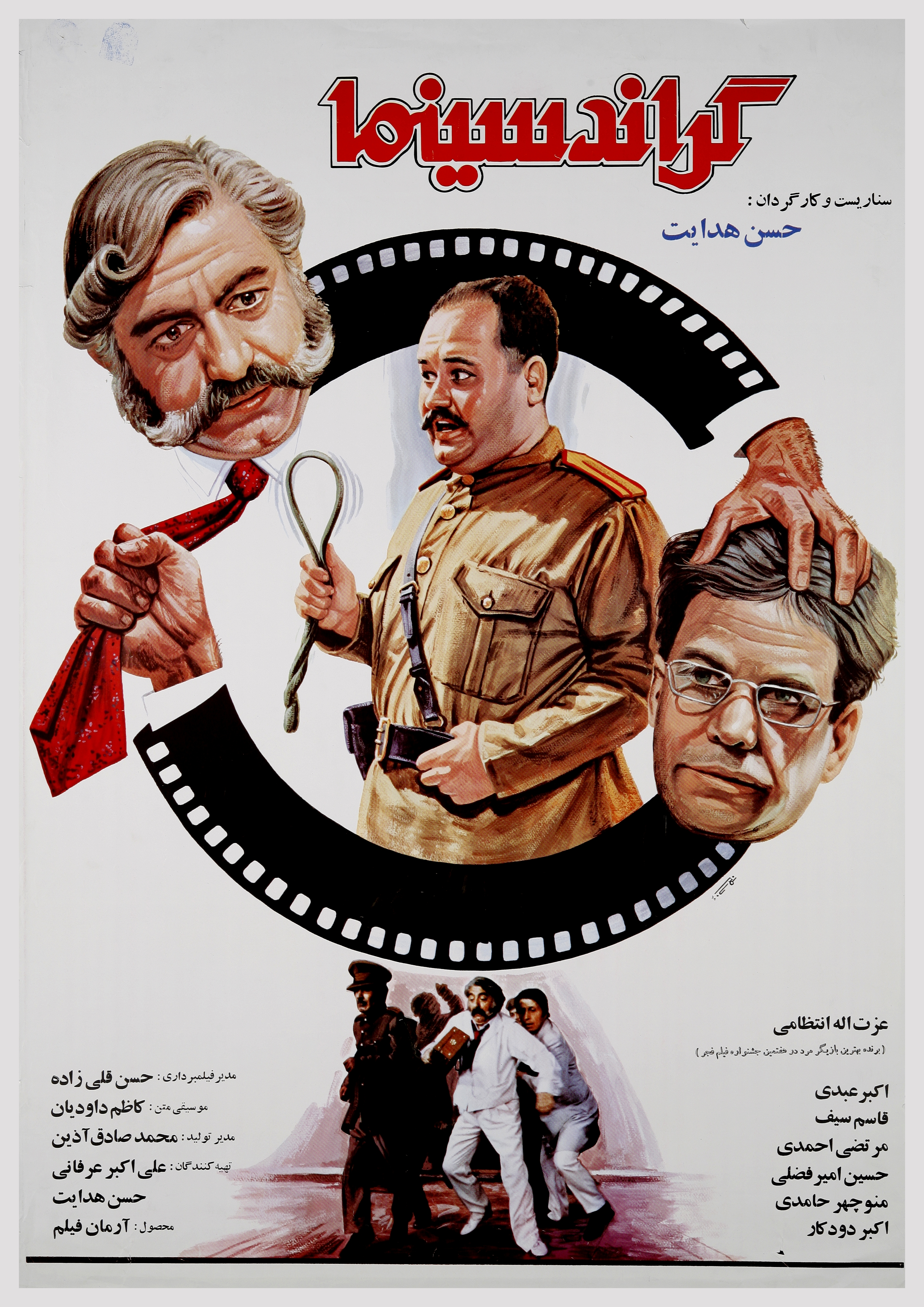
- Directed by: Hassan Hedayat
- Written by: Hassan Hedayat
- Starring: Ezzatolah Entezami
- Cinematography: Hassan Gholizadeh
- Release date: July 1989
- Country: Iran
- Language: Persian

Grand Cinema is a 1989 Iranian comedy film directed by Hassan Hedayat. It was entered into the 16th Moscow International Film Festival.

== Cast ==
- Ebrahim Abadi
- Akbar Abdi
- Fereydoon Aboo Zia
- Morteza Ahmadi
- Hosein Amirfazli
- Mahmoud Basiri
- Akbar Doodkar
- Maliheh Ebrahimi
- Ezzatolah Entezami as Aghaiev
- Nasser Laghayi
- Yoosef Samad Zadeh
