= The Pear Tree =

- Directed by: Dariush Mehrjui
- Written by: Dariush Mehrjui; Goli Taraghi
- Produced by: Dariush Mehrjui
- Starring: Homayoun Ershadi; Golshifteh Farahani; Mohammad Reza Shaban-Noori; Nematollah Gorji
- Cinematography: Mahmoud Kalari
- Release date: 1 October 1998
- Running time: 95 min
- Country: Iran
- Language: Persian

The Pear Tree (Persian: درخت گلابی, romanized: Derakht-e-Golabi) is a 1998 Iranian drama film written and directed by Dariush Mehrjui with Homayoun Ershadi and Golshifteh Farahani in the lead. It was noted for the exemplary craftsmanship of Dariush Mehrjui on his examination of the Iranian bourgeoisie. This film also marked the debut of actress Golshifteh Farahani.

== Synopsis ==
Mahmoud (Homayoun Ershadi) is suffering from writer's block and he is unable to continue the book he is currently working upon. He decides to take a break from his routine life and plans to visit his family's rural estate that is situated at north of Tehran. He also intends to complete his book in this visit. While at the estate, Mahmoud's attention is brought to the old Pear Tree that is situated behind the estate by the old gardener of the estate (Nematollah Gorji). Seeing the Pear Tree, Mahmoud thinks about his past - his infatuation towards his 14-year-old female cousin known only as M (Golshifteh Farahani), his adolescent dreams, how that changed over the years. The rest of the film chronicles thoughts of Mahmoud and his past.

== Cast ==
- Homayoun Ershadi as Mahmoud
- Golshifteh Farahani as M
- Nematollah Gorji as Old gardener
- Shaghayegh Farahani
- Mohammad Reza Shaban-Noori
- Sassan Bagherpour
- Jafar Bozorgi
- Amir Ali Ghezelayagh
- Shahram Haghighat Doost
- Ahou Alagha
- Rahman Hoseini
- Jahangir Mirshekari
- Maryam Moghbeli
- Maliheh Nazari

== Reception ==
The Pear Tree was met with highly positive reviews and considered as a majestic inclination of internalization of Iranian Cinema. This movie is usually considered as one of the finest example of Dariush Mehrjui's craftmanship.

== Awards ==
- Silver Hugo Award for Best Feature Film in Chicago International Film Festival (1998)
- Simorgh Prize for Best Actress for Golshifteh Farahani in Fajr Film Festival (1998)
- Simorg Prize for Best Cinematography for Mahmoud Kalari in Fajr Film Festival (1998)
