= Zir-e tigh =

2006 Iranian TV series

- TV poster
- Also known as: Under the Blade
- زیر تیغ
- Created by: Mohammad Reza Honarmand
- Written by: Ali Akbar Mahloujian
- Starring: Parviz Parastui; Fatemeh Motamed Arya; Siavosh Tahmoures; Kourosh Tahami; Elham Hamidi; Atila Pesyani; Shabnam Moghaddami
- Country of origin: Iran
- No. of episodes: 19

Production
- Producer: Mohammad Ali Eslami
- Running time: 60 minutes
- Production company: IRIB

Original release
- Network: IRIB TV1
- Release: October 31, 2006 – March 12, 2007

Zir-e tigh (Persian: زیر تیغ, lit. 'Under the Blade') is an Iranian drama television series that originally aired on the IRIB TV1 on October 31, 2006. The series contained 19 episodes, and was a popular success among the viewers. It aired on Wednesday nights after the nightly national news on IRIB TV1. The show was later re-run daily on IRIB 1, IRIB 2 and IRIB 3 for those living abroad. The show's finale aired on March 12, 2007.

== Synopsis ==
The show focuses on the lives of two close, yet torn apart by a tragic event families. Mahmood and Jafar are two close working class friends who work with each other at a refrigerator manufacturing factory. Their families are also very close to each other, as Jafar's son is engaged to Mahmood's daughter. Jafar's older brother Ghodrat, opposes the engagement. Ghodrat wants his daughter to marry Jafar's son. Ghodrat and his friends attempt to split up the two families in order to sabotage the engagement. Mahmood, who is the head of the storage and inventory facility at the factory, is fired from his job after the allegations of the theft come up. Mahmood and Jafar get into a fight and Mahmood accidentally kills Jafar. This leads to a rift between the two families, including the engaged couple as well as other people close to Mahmoood and Jafar.

== Cast ==
The cast of Zire Tigh was considered to be one of its strong points. Parviz Parastui, Fatemeh Motamed-Arya and Atila Pesyani portray three of the main characters in the series. Parastui's performance in particular was widely acclaimed.

- Parviz Parastui as Mahmood Foroughi
- Fatemeh Motamed-Arya as Tahereh Foroughi': Mahmood's wife
- Siavosh Tahmoures as Ghodrat Omidvar: Jafar's brother
- Kourosh Tahami as Reza Omidvar: Jafar's son
- Elham Hamidi as Maryam Foroughi: Mahmood and Tahereh's daughter
- Atila Pesyani as Jafar Omidvar
- Shabnam Moghaddami as Marziyeh
- Tarlan Parvaneh as Mahmood's daughter
- Ghazal Saremi as Ghodrat's daughter

== Reception ==
The show was widely viewed. According to a survey conducted by the IRIB, more than 80% of those surveyed watched the show, and a large percentage of them claimed they were depressed as an outcome of watching. Viewers considered the performance of the actors as a strong point of the show, but its often depressing plot was considered a negative.
