= Abdulali Ali-Asgari =

Iranian media executive

- عبدالعلی علی‌عسگری
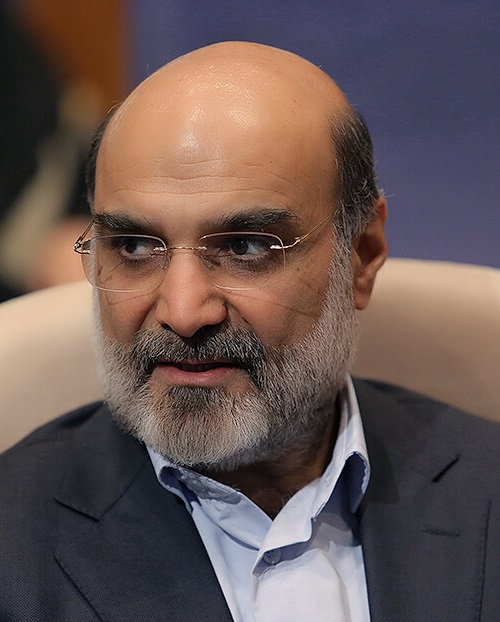

Head of Islamic Republic of Iran Broadcasting
- In office 11 May 2016 – 29 September 2021
- Appointed by: Ali Khamenei
- Preceded by: Mohammad Sarafraz
- Succeeded by: Peyman Jebelli

Chairman of Iran Broadcasting University
- In office 2002–2005
- Preceded by: Mojtaba Samareh Hashemi
- Succeeded by: Mohammad Masoud Aboutalebi

Personal details
- Born: Abdulali Ali-Asgari; 1958 (age 67–68) Ray, Tehran, Iran
- Party: Mojahedin of the Islamic Revolution Organization (1980s)
- Education: University of Tehran; Iran University of Science and Technology; Amirkabir University of Technology

Abdulali Ali-Asgari (Persian: عبدالعلی علی‌عسگری; born 1958 in Ray, Tehran, Iran) is an Iranian executive director. He was former CEO of Persian Gulf Petrochemical Industries Corporation from January 2022 to December 2024. He is also an Iranian media executive who was the former director-general of IRIB.

Ali-Asgari, who was previously a deputy at IRIB in charge of technology and a professor at the Iran Broadcasting University, was appointed as IRIB's director-general on 11 May 2016 after previous head Mohammad Sarafraz resigned from office. He has been referred to as "the father of digital television in Iran" for his work on converting the organization from analog to digital.

Ali-Asgari is sanctioned by the United States Department of the Treasury due to human rights violations during his tenure as head of the IRIB.

He is uncle of Hamidreza Aliasgari.

== Career ==
Before the 1979 Islamic Revolution, Ali-Asgari was a follower of Ayatollah Ruhollah Khomeini, founder of the Islamic Republic of Iran. He was arrested for his political activities by the previous government's secret police and was in prison until the final days of the revolution. He held important posts within the Islamic Republic after the revolution, including adviser for the Supreme Council of the Cultural Revolution and heading the IRIB college.

When Mohammad Sarafraz was appointed as head of IRIB in November 2014, Ali-Asgari was reportedly on the short list of potential candidates. Ali-Asgari immediately clashed with Sarafraz, and according to Iranian media, was either let go or resigned. The head of Iran's judiciary, Ayatollah Sadeq Larijani, appointed Ali-Asgari as an adviser.

Ali-Asgari was appointed as IRIB head on 11 May 2016, after days of speculation. He will be taking over an institution that has faced numerous challenges and scandals. According to Donya-e-Eqtesad newspaper, some of the controversies include the removal and hiring of new managers who clashed with the old guard and the closure of provincial stations that led to a number of layoffs. The previous IRIB head, Ezatollah Zarghami, held the position from 2004 to 2014, leaving an indelible mark on the organization and the makeup of its staff. Some disagreements and fights became so severe, according to Donya-e-Eqtesad, that the security institutions of the country reportedly became involved.

== Human rights and International sanctions ==
Under his tenure Iranian TV aired 355 forced confessions. Some of the forced confessors reported being tortured physically or sexually and intimidated through relations. According to the Associated Press the televised forced confessions were meant to intimidate activists and dissent within Iran.

In 2018, the United States sanctioned Ali-Asgari for “restricting or denying the free flow of information to or from the Iranian people.”

Media offices
| Preceded by Mohammad Sarafraz | Director-General of IRIB; 2016–2021 | Succeeded by Peyman Jebelli |
