= National Iranian Television =

The name National Iranian Television may represent:

- National Iranian Radio and Television, Iran's first radio/television network which operated from 1966 to 1979

- Islamic Republic of Iran Broadcasting, the successor organization to the above after the 1979 Iranian Revolution
