= The Autumnal Mother =

- Directed by: Sirous Ranjbar
- Written by: Sirous Ranjbar
- Produced by: Sirous Ranjbar
- Starring: Hanieh Tavassoli; Alireza Jalali-tabar; Vahid Rahbani; Behnaz Jafari; Arash Tajtehrani; Katayoun Karaei
- Cinematography: Shahriyar Assadi
- Edited by: Fereidoon Jameh-bozorg
- Music by: Sattar Oraki
- Release date: 2012
- Running time: 87 minutes
- Country: Iran
- Language: Persian

The Autumnal Mother (Persian: مادر پاییزی, romanized: Madare-h Paeizi) is a 2012 Iranian drama film written and directed by Sirous Ranjbar.

== Plot ==
Saeed, whose wife is missing, has never been in love. His son has autism. A nurse enters the house in the presence of Saeed.

== Cast ==
- Hanieh Tavassoli as Sareh
- Alireza Jalali-tabar as Saeed
- Vahid Rahbani
- Behnaz Jafari
- Arash Tajtehrani
- Mokhtar Saeghi
- Katayoun Karaei
