= Hanieh Tavassoli =

Iranian actress (born 1979)

- هانیه توسلی
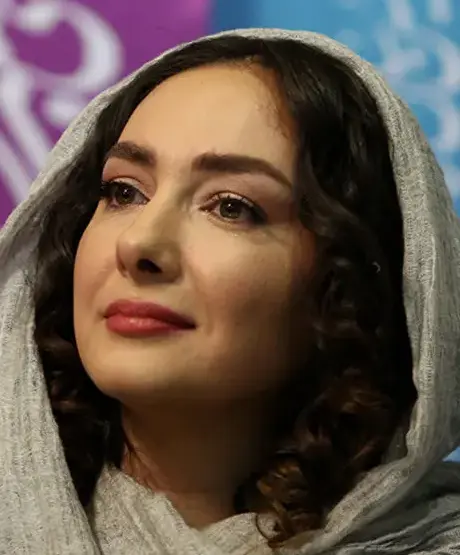
- Hanieh Tavassoli in Fajr Film Festival 2019
- Born: June 4, 1979 (age 47); Hamedan, Iran
- Education: Azad University
- Occupation: Actress
- Years active: 2000–present

Hanieh Tavassoli (Persian: هانیه توسلی; born 4 June 1979) is an Iranian actress. She has received various accolades, including a Crystal Simorgh and an Iran Cinema Celebration Award, in addition to nominations for five Hafez Awards and an Iran's Film Critics and Writers Association Award.

== Filmography ==
=== Film ===
| Year | Title | Role | Director |
|---|---|---|---|
| 2024 | Hard Shell | Mozhgan | Majid-Reza Mostafavi |
| 2022 | The Locust | Hanieh | Faezeh Azizkhani |
| 2021 | Face To Face | | Babak Bahram Beigi |
| 2020 | Silent Snail | Elham | Behrang Dezfoulizadeh |
| 2019 | Dance With Me | Nahid | Soroush Sehat |
| 2019 | We Are All Together | Nazanin | Kamal Tabrizi |
| 2019 | Main Idea | Laleh | Azita Moguie |
| 2018 | The Misunderstanding | | Ahmad Reza Motamedi |
| 2018 | Columbus | Shahnaz / Sarah | Hatef Alimardani |
| 2018 | A Bigger Game | Homa | Abbas Nezamdoost |
| 2017 | Dead End of Trust | Leyla Vosough | Hamid Kaviani |
| 2017 | Motherhood | Golnar | Roghayeh Tavakoli |
| 2016 | Blind Spot | Nahid | Mahdi Golestaneh |
| 2016 | Cyanide | Homa / Hengameh | Behrouz Shoeibi |
| 2016 | Seven Months | Salume | Hatef Alimardani |
| 2015 | The Time I Came Back | | Vahid Mousaian |
| 2015 | Gap | Sara | Kiarash Asadizadeh |
| 2015 | Sperm Whale | Arjang's Mother | Saman Moghaddam |
| 2014 | Dying in September | Neda | Hatef Alimardani |
| 2013 | For Pooneh's Sake | Pooneh | Hatef Alimardani |
| 2013 | The Corridor | Shiva | Behrouz Shoeibi |
| 2013 | The Exclusive Line | Samira | Mostafa Kiaee |
| 2012 | Private Life | Parisa Zandi | Hossein Farahbakhsh |
| 2011 | Purple Clouds | Parvaneh | Siamak Shayeghi |
| 2011 | The Autumnal Mother | Sareh Farazmand | Sirous Ranjbar |
| 2011 | Nadarha | Mehri | Mohammad Reza Arab |
| 2011 | Mr. Yousef | Rana | Ali Rafie |
| 2009 | The Evening of The 10th Day | Maryam / Rahmeh | Mojtaba Raie |
| 2009 | Punishment | Mahsa | Hassan Fathi |
| 2008 | Shirin | Woman In Audience | Abbas Kiarostami |
| 2007 | Miss Iran | | Saman Moghaddam |
| 2007 | Lover | GooGoo | Afshin Sherkat |
| 2007 | Unexpected | Shiva | Mohammad Hadi Karimi |
| 2006 | Star Café | Salume | Saman Moghadfam |
| 2006 | The Time Will Be Stopped | | Alireza Amini |
| 2006 | On a Friday Afternoon | Banafsheh | Mona Zandi Haghighi |
| 2005 | One Night | Negar | Niki Karimi |
| 2005 | A Place To Live | Rana | Mohammad Bozorgnia |
| 2004 | Aida, I Saw Your Dad Last Night | (as Casting Director) | Rasul Sadrameli |
| 2003 | White Nights | Roya | Farzad Motamen |
| 2003 | Take A Look At the Sky Sometimes | Hanieh | Kamal Tabrizi |
| 2002 | The Ethereal | Khorshid | Mohammad Ali Sadjadi |
| 2001 | Tha Last Supper | Setareh Mashreghi | Fereydoun Jeyrani |
| 2000 | The End of The Game | (as Assistant Director) | Homayoun As'adian |

=== Web ===
| Year | Title | Role | Director | Platform | Notes |
|---|---|---|---|---|---|
| 2012 | Icy Heart | Diba / Najme | Saman Moghaddam | Video CD | Supporting role; season 3 |
| 2013–2014 | King of Ear | Mahboobeh Dardashti | Davood Mirbagheri | Video CD | Supporting role |
| 2014–2015 | Fool | Parisa | Kamal Tabrizi | Video CD | Main role |
| 2021 | Gisoo | Katayoun Azad | Manouchehr Hadi | Namava | Main role |
| 2021 | Mortal Wound | Mansoureh Rizabadi | Mohammad Hossein Mahdavian | Filimo | Main role |
| 2023 | Actor | Nazi | Nima Javidi | Filimo, Namava | Main role; season 1 |
| 2023 | You Only Go Around Once | Herself | Soroush Sehhat | Filimo, Namava | Cameo |

=== Television ===
| Year | Title | Role | Director | Network | Notes |
|---|---|---|---|---|---|
| 2000 | Stranger | | Javad Ardakani | IRIB TV2 | TV series |
| 2006 | Vafa | Vafa Abouzayd | Mohammad Hossein Latifi | IRIB TV3 | TV series |
| 2007–2008 | The Forbidden Fruit | Hasti | Hassan Fathi | IRIB TV2 | TV series |
| 2009 | Shamsol Emareh | Leila | Saman Moghaddam | IRIB TV2 | TV series |

=== Short film ===
| Year | Title | Role | Director |
|---|---|---|---|
| 2015 | Three Fish | Elham | Hamid Reza Ghorbani |
| 2004 | Late Time | | Asghar Naimi |
| 2001 | On A Damp Road | | Mehdi Karampour |

== Theaters ==
| Year | Title | Director | Ref. |
|---|---|---|---|
| 2010 | Professor Bobos | Atila Pesyani | |
| 2011 | Rooster Feather Ration | Ali Nargesnejad | |
| 2012 | We Came, You Were Not, We Went. | Reza Hadad | |
| 2013 | Date | Siamak Ahsaei | |
| 2015 | An Elegy For Book Burning | Ali Etehad | |
| 2016–2017 | Love Letters From The Middle East | Kiumars Moradi | |
| 2017–2018 | Sound And Fury | Mehrdad Rayani | |
| ? | The Father | Nasrolah ghaderi | |
| ? | Red And The Others | Mohammad Yaghoubi | |
| ? | Candlestick flowers | Mohammad Yaghoubi | |

== Awards and nominations ==
Name of the award ceremony, year presented, category, nominee of the award, and the result of the nomination
| Award | Year | Category | Nominated Work | Result |
|---|---|---|---|---|
| Fajr Film Festival | 2003 | Best Actress in a Leading Role | White Nights | Nominated |
| Fajr Film Festival | 2005 | Best Actress in a Supporting Role | A Place To Live | Nominated |
| Fajr Film Festival | 2006 | Best Actress in a Leading Role | The Time Will Be Stopped | Nominated |
| Fajr Film Festival | 2011 | Best Actress in a Leading Role | Nadarah | Nominated |
| Fajr Film Festival | 2013 | Best Actress in a Leading Role | The Corridor | Won |
| Fajr Film Festival | 2018 | Best Actress in a Leading Role | The Misunderstanding | Nominated |
| Hafez Awards | 2002 | Best Actress – Motion Picture | The Ethereal | Nominated |
| Hafez Awards | 2003 | Best Actress – Motion Picture | White Nights | Nominated |
| Hafez Awards | 2009 | Best Actress – Television Series Drama | The Forbidden Fruit | Nominated |
| Hafez Awards | 2014 | Best Actress – Motion Picture | The Corridor | Nominated |
| Hafez Awards | 2019 | Best Actress – Motion Picture | Columbus | Nominated |
| Iran Cinema Celebration | 2003 | Best Actress in a Leading Role | White Nights | Won |
| Iran Cinema Celebration | 2010 | Best Actress in a Leading Role | The Evening of The 10th Day | Nominated |
| Iran's Film Critics and Writers Association | 2014 | Best Actress in a Leading Role | The Corridor | Nominated |
| Azad Cinema Celebration | 2002 | Best Actress | On A Damp Road | Won |

== See also ==
- Iranian women
- Iranian cinema
- List of famous Persian women
