= The Corridor (2013 film) =

- Theatrical poster
- Persian: دهلیز
- Directed by: Behrouz Shoeibi
- Screenplay by: Ali Asghari
- Story by: Behrouz Shoeibi
- Produced by: Mahmoud Razavi
- Starring: Reza Attaran; Hanieh Tavassoli; Shahrokh Forutanian; Afsaneh Chehreh Azad
- Cinematography: Mehdi Jafari
- Edited by: Hamidreza Ghorbani
- Music by: Behzad Abdi
- Release date: July 31, 2013
- Running time: 92 minutes
- Country: Iran
- Language: Persian
- Box office: 220,300 USD

The Corridor (Persian: دهلیز; transliterated as: Dehliz) is a 2013 Iranian drama film directed by Behrouz Shoeibi. Reza Attaran and Hanieh Tavassoli play the leading roles. The film mainly deals with the Islamic concept of Qisas. This was Shoeibi's debut film. As he has been a director's assistant and an actor, he didn't have some technical problems other first film directors do. This was also one of rare performances of Reza Attaran, not in a comic role. Hanieh Tavassoli won the crystal simorgh for best actress in a leading role in 31st Fajr International Film Festival.

== Plot ==
Shiva (Hanieh Tavassoli) is the family head and looks after her little son, Amir Ali (Mohammad Reza Shirkhanlou); a witty and playful boy, in the absence of her husband, Behzad (Reza Attaran) who has committed manslaughter in a fight over a parking space with another man. Now he is in prison and waiting for his verdict. Amir Ali is a first grader and thinks his father is dead, but after visiting him in prison, he gets depressed.

Shiva visits the murdered man's brother-in-law every day and asks him to talk to his family in order to get their approval to be paid the Blood money. The victim's twin sister is very persistent in doing the Equal retaliation and they can't get her satisfaction. Mr. Izadi (Shahrokh Foroutanian), the warden and his wife (Afsaneh Chehreh Azad) who is a social worker, also try to help Behzad.

Meanwhile, the visits between Amir Ali and Behzad become more and more intimate after Behzad gives his son a wooden horse which he has made in prison. Behzad is a former English teacher and teaches one of the guards privately to make him ready for the entrance exams. Because of his good behavior, Behzad gets a three-day permission to go home. This out-of-prison visit improves Amir Ali's self-confidence, and he becomes calmer and even his grades are better now.

Finally, Izadi takes Amir Ali to the victim's house where his mother is speechless for five years because of her son's death. Amir Ali apologizes for his father's action in a childish way and makes the mother cry. But we don't know whether her response is to forgive or to execute Behzad.

== Cast ==
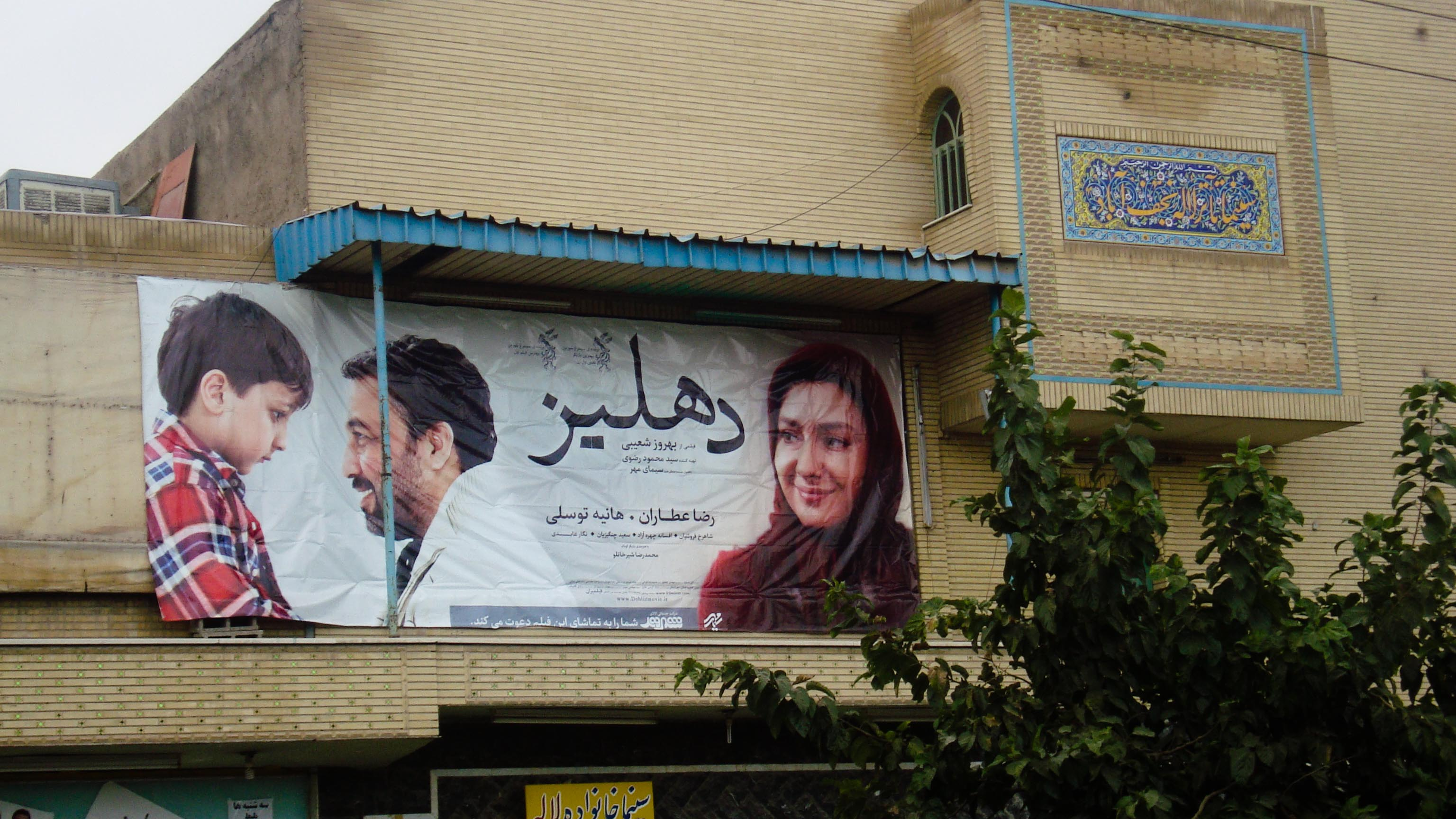
Dehliz's banner on a cinema in Najaf Abad, Isfahan

- Reza Attaran as Behzad, a former teacher who is in prison for manslaughter.
- Hanieh Tavassoli as Shiva, Behzad's wife who is a strong-willed woman and looks after her only son, Amir Ali.
- Mohammad Reza Shirkhanlou as Amir Ali, The family's playful son. He gradually copes with his father's situation as a prisoner waiting for his verdict.
- Shahrokh Foroutanian as Izadi, The prison's warden who realizes that Behzad is innocent and needs to be helped.
- Afsaneh Chehreh Azad as A'zam Marandi, a social worker and the wife of Izadi who helps Shiva to get the victim's family satisfaction.
- Saeed Changizian as Rezayi, the victim's brother-in-law who helps Shiva and talks to the victim's family.
- Masoud Mir Taheri as Rasouli, The prison's guard. He knows that Behzad is a good man and provides a collateral for Behzad's three-day vacation.
- Negar Abedi as The victim's twin sister who is stubborn on executing Behzad as an eye for eye action.
