= National Iranian Radio and Television =

Former state broadcaster of Iran (1971–1979)

- Type: Broadcast radio and television
- Country: Imperial State of Iran
- Availability: National
- Owner: Government of Iran under the Pahlavi dynasty
- Launch date: 1966
- Dissolved: 1979

National Iranian Radio and Television (NIRT; Persian: سازمان رادیو تلویزیون ملی ایران, Sâzmân-e Râdyo Televizyon-e Melli-ye 'Irân) was the first Iranian state broadcaster, which was established on June 19, 1971, following the merger of the country's radio and television services. It operated up until the Iranian Revolution in 1979, after which NIRT became the Islamic Republic of Iran Broadcasting (IRIB).

== Background and history ==
=== Introduction of television ===
Television was first introduced in Iran on October 3, 1958, by Television Iran (TVI). A privately owned and commercially operated monopoly, TVI carried Western programming dubbed in Persian. Following the opening of its station in Tehran, it established a station in Abadan on February 28, 1960.

This was followed by National Iranian Television (NITV) in 1966. Earlier that year, the Plan and Budget Organization allocated a budget for the project, and the Ministry of Economics donated land. A temporary structure was built, and on October 26, NITV transmitted its first broadcast message, a statement by the Shah. Test programs were run, and complete programming commenced at Nowruz, the Iranian New Year, in March 1967. The first week’s programs included the broadcasting of the Shah’s birthday celebrations from Amjadieh Stadium.

=== Creation of NIRT ===
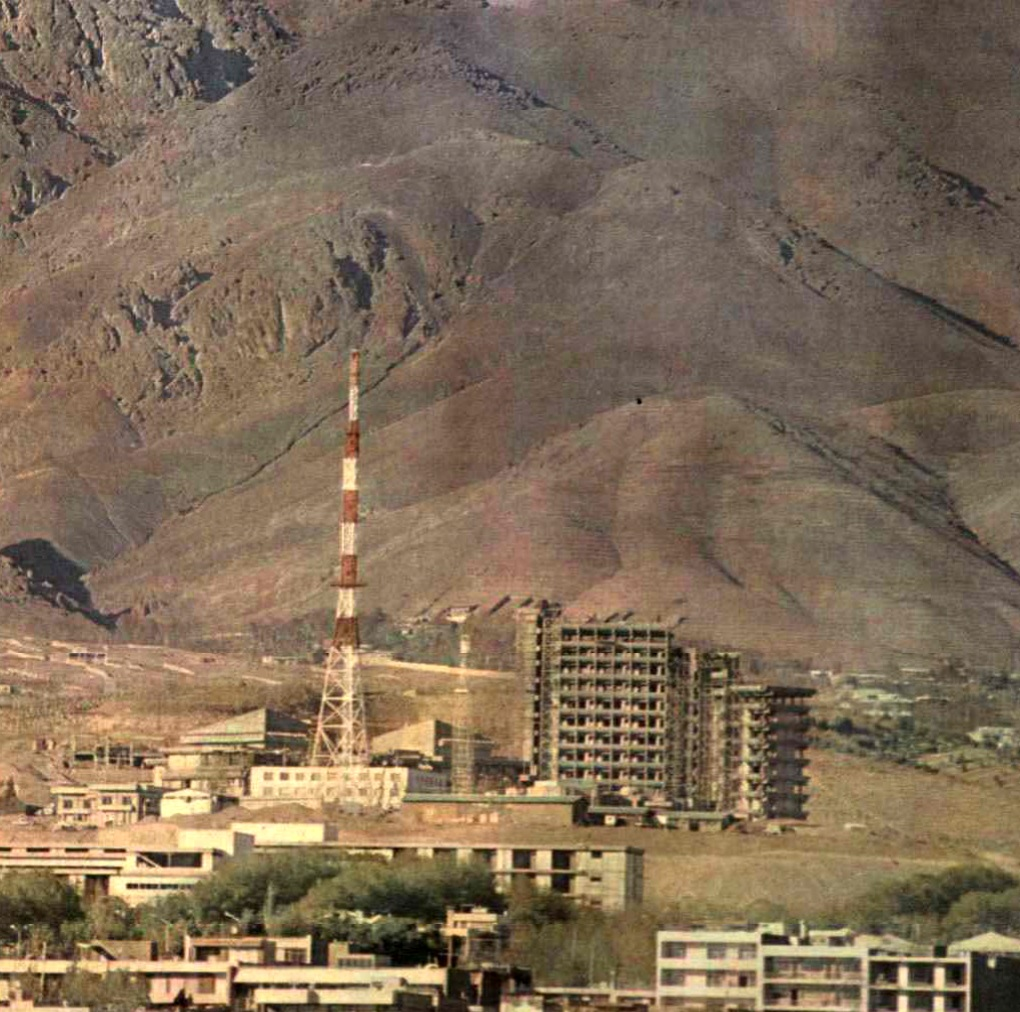
NIRT Antenna In Tehran (1971)

In June 1967, the Parliament approved a proposal for the economic and administrative independence of NITV, under which it would merge with Radio Iran in 1971 to form National Iranian Radio and Television (NIRT). This was incorporated as a public broadcasting monopoly run as an independent government corporation, with the Shah appointing Reza Ghotbi as the first director-general. TVI, meanwhile, had been nationalised in 1969.

Prior to 1967, television had covered about 2.1 million people; when NIRT began regular transmissions that year, coverage rose to 4.8 million, and by 1974 had risen to over 15 million, roughly half the total population. The large budget allocations that were provided to NIRT, a reflection of the organisation's role in development, enabled it to use the latest technologies, including microwave delivery systems, to overcome problems of mountainous terrain.

By 1975–76, radio covered almost the entire country, and 70 percent of the population had television reception. Before then, by 1973, NIRT had already established a total of 14 television production centres with 153 transmitters, covering approximately 88 cities and towns in Iran, accounting for 60 per cent of the population. The following year, this had increased to fifteen, including two in Tehran, as well as one each in the provincial cities of Abadan (established in October 1970), Ardebil, Bandar Abbas (October 1968), Esfahan (March 1969), Kerman (September 1971), Kermanshah (October 1970), Shiraz (November 1969), Mahabad (September 1971), Mashad (September 1971), Rasht (April 1970), Rezaiyeh (July 1968), Sanandaj (September 1971), Tabriz (March 1971) and Zahedan (September 1971).

Despite overall budget cuts in 1975–76, NIRT's total budget rose about 20 percent. Earlier, it had aimed for its first television network to reach 65 per cent of the population of Iran, with its second network reaching 50 per cent by the end of 1977, marking the end of the country's Fifth Development Plan. The first network, known as the First Program, carried general content, of which only 33 per cent was imported, with the second network or Second Program aiming to show more educational and cultural content, of which 60 per cent of its content was imported.

By 1974, Iran was second only to Japan in Asia in terms of the development of its broadcasting capabilities. This prompted one Western commentator to argue in 1977 that "[if] Iran continues on its present path it will be the first nation in the world to have nationally spread television before a nationally spread press".

Colour television broadcasts first began in 1975, although reception was largely confined to affluent people able to afford colour sets. Regular colour broadcasts were introduced in 1976. The standard was changed to the French SECAM in February 1977, resulting in imported television sets becoming unusable. Although NIRT had the facilities to broadcast in colour, and used this when broadcasting the Asian Games held in Tehran in 1974, full broadcasts in colour were delayed until 1978, on account of the ability of local manufacturers to meet demand for colour sets.

=== NIRT International Radio and Television ===
For 22 years, the American Forces Radio and Television Service (AFRTS) broadcast a local radio service (Radio 1555) and 17 years of local TV service (Channel 7) to the capital of Iran from their studios in Tehran. However, in 1976 it was decided by the Iranian government that AFRTS should close down its radio and TV services, which it did on October 25, 1976.

The following morning, October 26th, the Shah's birthday, the new government-owned radio and television service began under the control of NIRT Director General, Reza Ghotbi, with Cyrus Ramtin as the first director of NIRT's new international channel. Like the AFRTS services they replaced, they appealed to the 60,000 US Army and civilian personnel then stationed in Iran, as well as the wider population of foreign nationals resident in the country.

NIRT International Radio, initially known as Tehran International, broadcast in English. It had a team of American and British presenters, Ted Anthony - previously from KLAC, Los Angeles, and from the UK: Frank Carpenter previously from Radio Hallam, and Marc Paul. The initial English language news team all from the UK comprised John Coulson who subsequently joined Presentation, Ray Goff, Peter Body and Mike Russell. Later Presentation was joined by Claude "Hoot" Hooten (as Brad Edwards) - previously from KGBS Los Angeles. Two Iranian DJs joined the team, adding local talent: Sepehr Azari from CKLN-FM, who was also a TV producer with Network 1, and Rocky the Jockey.

NIRT International Television broadcast for eight and a half hours daily. Programs were mainly in English, with some films and programs in French and German. Although the service carried some programming devoted to Iranian culture and education, its output remained broadly similar to that of the AFRTS service it had replaced, with nearly all imported programs from the United States.

== Prominent employees ==
- Masoud Behnoud
- Hushang Ebtehaj
- Albert Koochooei
- Ahmad NikTalab
- Taghi Rouhani
- Mohammad-Reza Shajarian
- Mohammad-Reza Lotfi
- Jalaledin Moayerian

== See also ==
- Media of Iran
- Television in Iran
