= Jalaledin Moayerian =

Iranian film and television makeup artist

- جلال الدین معیریان
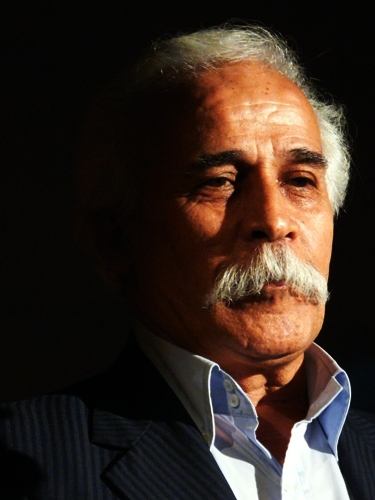
- Born: September 12, 1941 (age 84); Tehran - Iran
- Occupation: Makeup Artist
- Years active: 1970 - Present
- Awards: Crystal Simorgh

Jalaledin Moayerian (Jalal Moayerian, Persian: جلال الدین معیریان; born 12 September 1941) is an Iranian film and television makeup artist, referred to as "The Best Makeup Artist in Iranian Cinema." He was the recipient of three Crystal Simorgh awards as the best makeup artist from Fajr International Film Festival.

== Early life and training ==
Born in Tehran city in Iran, Moayerian studied makeup at Dramatic Art school and started working as the makeup artist in 1970. As the founder of Classic Makeup in Iranian Cinema, his innovation and creativity as the makeup artist for film and television in Death of Yazdgerd (1982), Sarbedaran (1984), Kamalol Molk (1983), Hezar Dastan (1987) and Sorb (1987) has been described as a revolutionary contribution to makeup artistry in the Iranian movie industry.

Moayerian is founder of the first Makeup Training Institute in Iran, and teaches makeup skills to the students.

== Awards and honours ==
- Golden Jam-e-Jam of Best Makeup from National Iranian Radio and Television for drama “Pumpkin and the Beast” (original title: Kadou Ghelgheli va Deev) | 1975 Persian: کدو قلقلی و دیو
- Crystal Simorgh of Best Makeup from 7th Fajr International Film Festival for movie “Lead” (original title: Sorb) | 1989 Persian: سرب
- Crystal Simorgh of Best Makeup from 14th Fajr International Film Festival for movie “Deer” (original title: Ghazal) | 1996 Persian: غزال
- Crystal Simorgh of Best Makeup from 15th Fajr International Film Festival for movie “Storm” (original title: Toofan) | 1997 Persian: طوفان
- Khaneh Cinema award of Best Makeup from 5th Iranian Cinema Festival for movie "Saint Mary" (original title: Maryam-e-Moghadas) | 2000 Persian: مریم مقدس
- Sima award of Best Makeup from 4th Television Sima Festival for series "Saint Mary" (original title: Maryam-e-Moghadas) | 2000 Persian: مریم مقدس
- Golden Sarv of Best Makeup from 3rd Jam-e-Jam Television Festival for two series "Butterfly" and "Darkness Gift" (original title: Parvaneh, and Armaghan-e-Tariki) | 2013 Persian: پروانه ، ارمغان تاریکی

In 2021, Moayerian received PhD equivalent degree in Art because of his innovation, creativity and remarkable achievements, and also was appreciated for his lifetime artistic activity as the makeup artist veteran in 2017.
