= Iran Broadcasting University =

Public university in Tehran

Coordinates: 35°46′47″N 51°24′21″E

- دانشگاه صدا و سیما; Dāneshgāh-e Sedā va Simā
- Former names: Advanced School of TV and Cinema; Technical Training Center; Iran Broadcasting College (before 1982)
- Type: Public
- Established: 1969; 57 years ago
- Academic affiliations: I.R.I.B
- Vice-president: Aref Alavi
- Chairman: Shahab Esfandiyari
- Location: Tehran, Iran
- Campus: Urban
- Website: www.iribu.ac.ir

The Iran Broadcasting University (Persian: دانشگاه صدا و سیما, Dāneshgāh-e Sedā va Simā) formerly known as the Iran Broadcasting College (Persian: دانشکده صدا و سیما, Dāneshkade-ye Sedā va Simā) is a public university in Tehran, Iran. It is affiliated to I.R.I.B and also has campuses in Qom.

== History ==
The first name of the institution was the Technical Training Center, which was later changed to IRIB University. In 1982 diplomas in production were promoted to bachelor's degrees and in 1995 and 1996 degrees in technical engineering and film production were added. In 1997 a communications degree was created to join academic disciplines.

In 1997, IRIB also established a broadcasting school up to degree level in Qom.

== Faculties ==
- Faculty of TV & Radio Productions

Majors: TV Directing(Dramatic and Documentary), Producers(Dramatic and Documentary), Radio(Writer and Producer), Playing international Instrument

- Faculty of Broadcast Engineering

Majors: Electrical Technician(Sound and Video and Transmitter), Electrical Engineering, Sound Engineering

- Faculty of Communication

Majors: Communication(News and Radio), Research in the Communication, Advertising and Marketing, Radio and TV Journalism

- Faculty of Digital Arts

Majors: TV and Digital Arts(Graphic and Animation)

- Faculty of Philosophy and Media

Majors: Media Management, Religion and Media, Dramatic Literature

- Faculty of Media Applied Science and Technology

Majors: Media, Sound, IT, Media Relations, Journalism, Animation, cinematography, Film Production, Financial Accounting, Cultural Affairs, Codification, Media Engineering, IT in Media Engineering

== Events ==
- 1st Conference on Broadcast Engineering 2005
- 2nd Conference on Broadcast Engineering 2007
- 3rd Conference on Broadcast Engineering 2009
- 4th Conference on Broadcast Engineering 2011

== Notable alumni ==
- Sirous Ranjbar
- Pouran Derakhshandeh
- Bahman Ghobadi
- Hossein Jafarian
- Fred Khoshtinat
- Jafar Panahi
  - Parviz Shahbazi
- Hamid Tamjidi
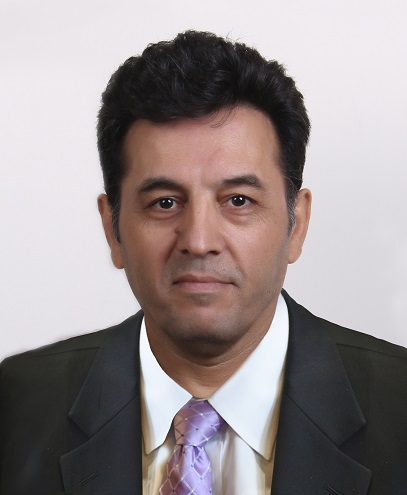
Sirous Ranjbar

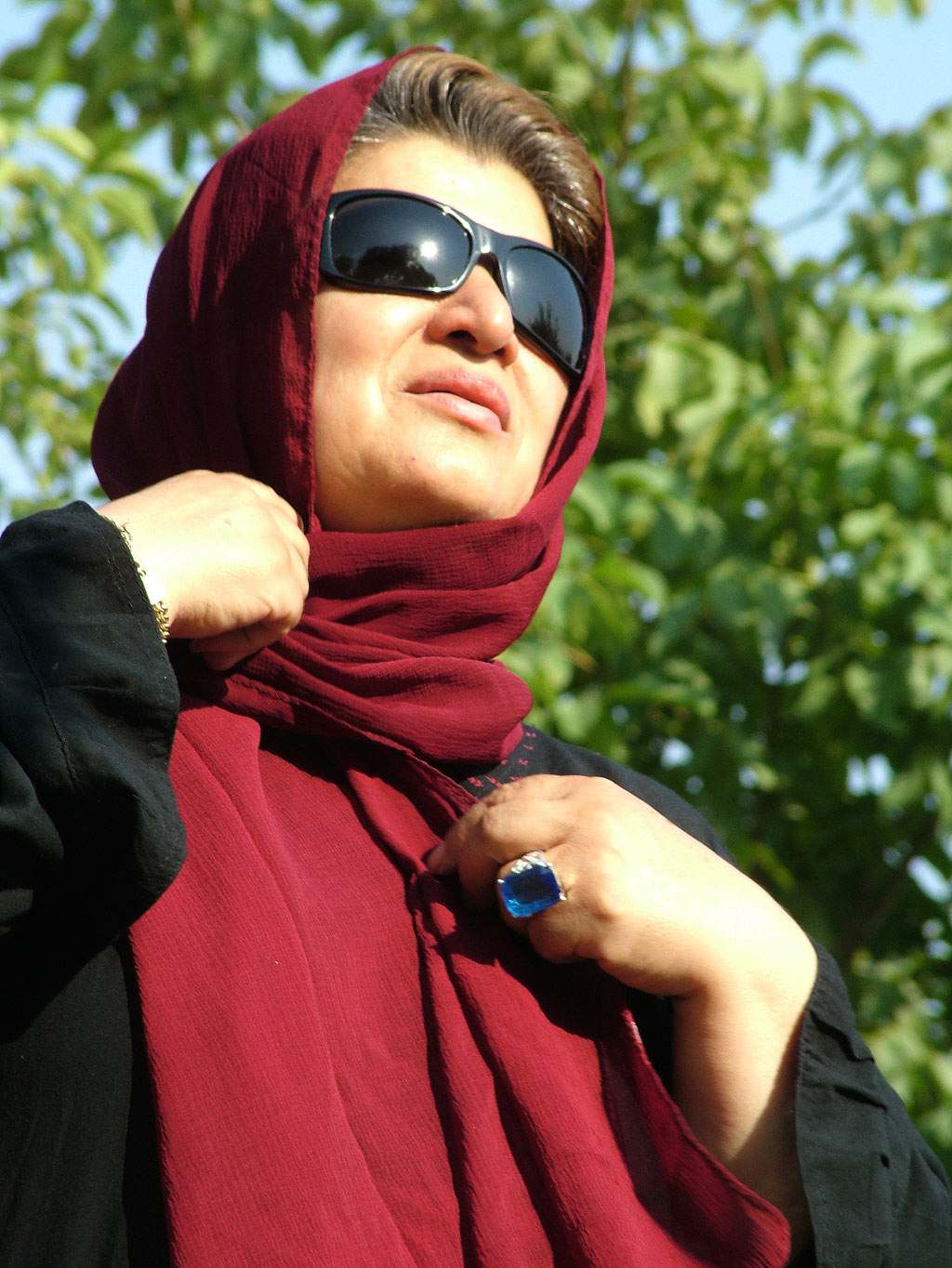
Pouran Derakhshandeh

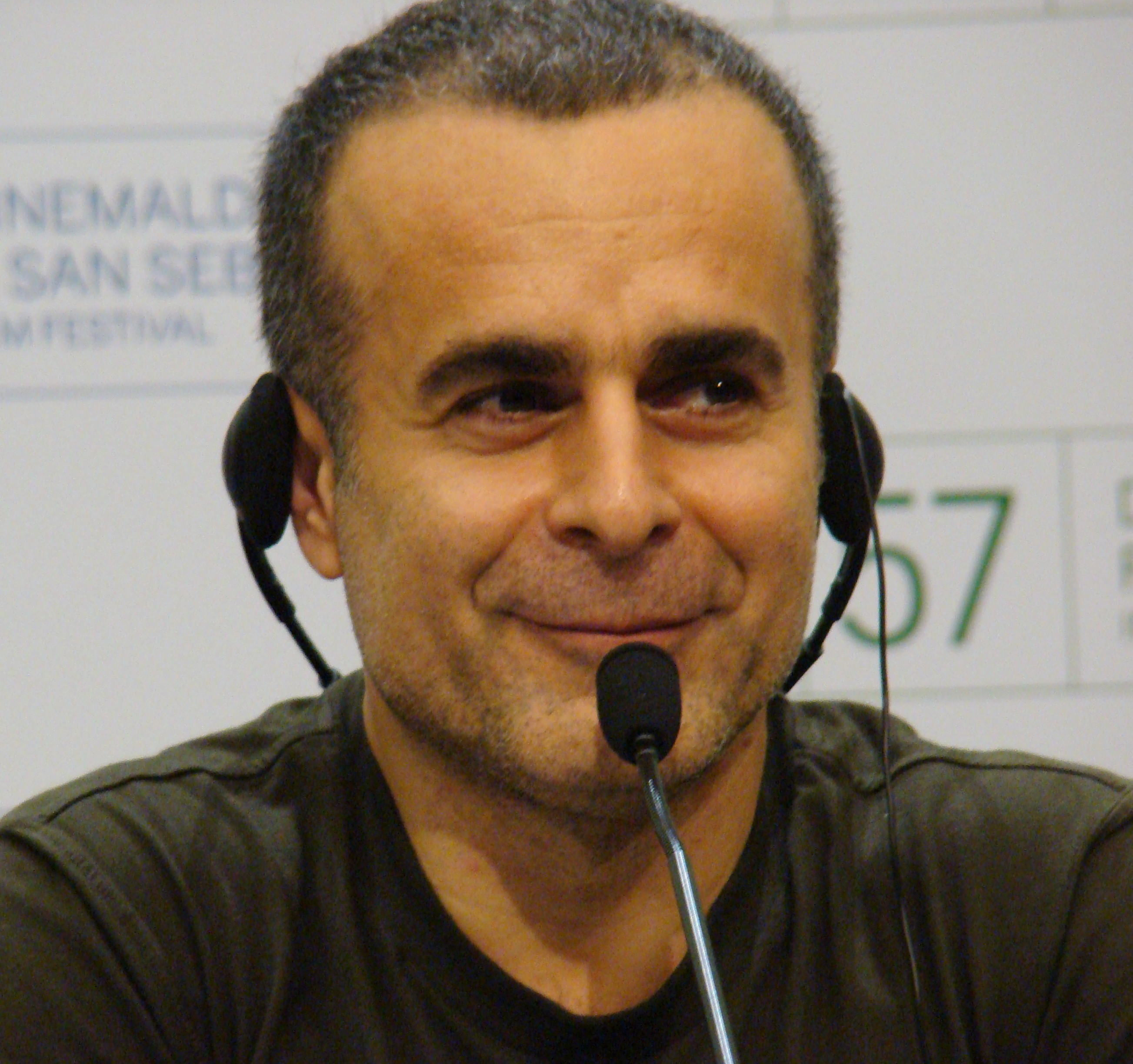
Bahman Ghobadi

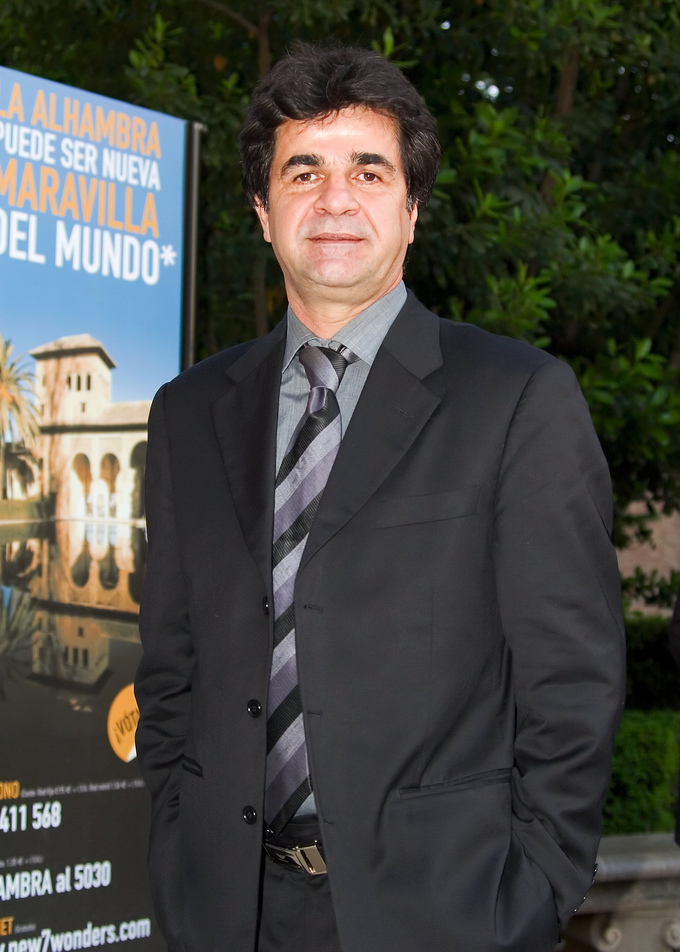
Jafar Panahi

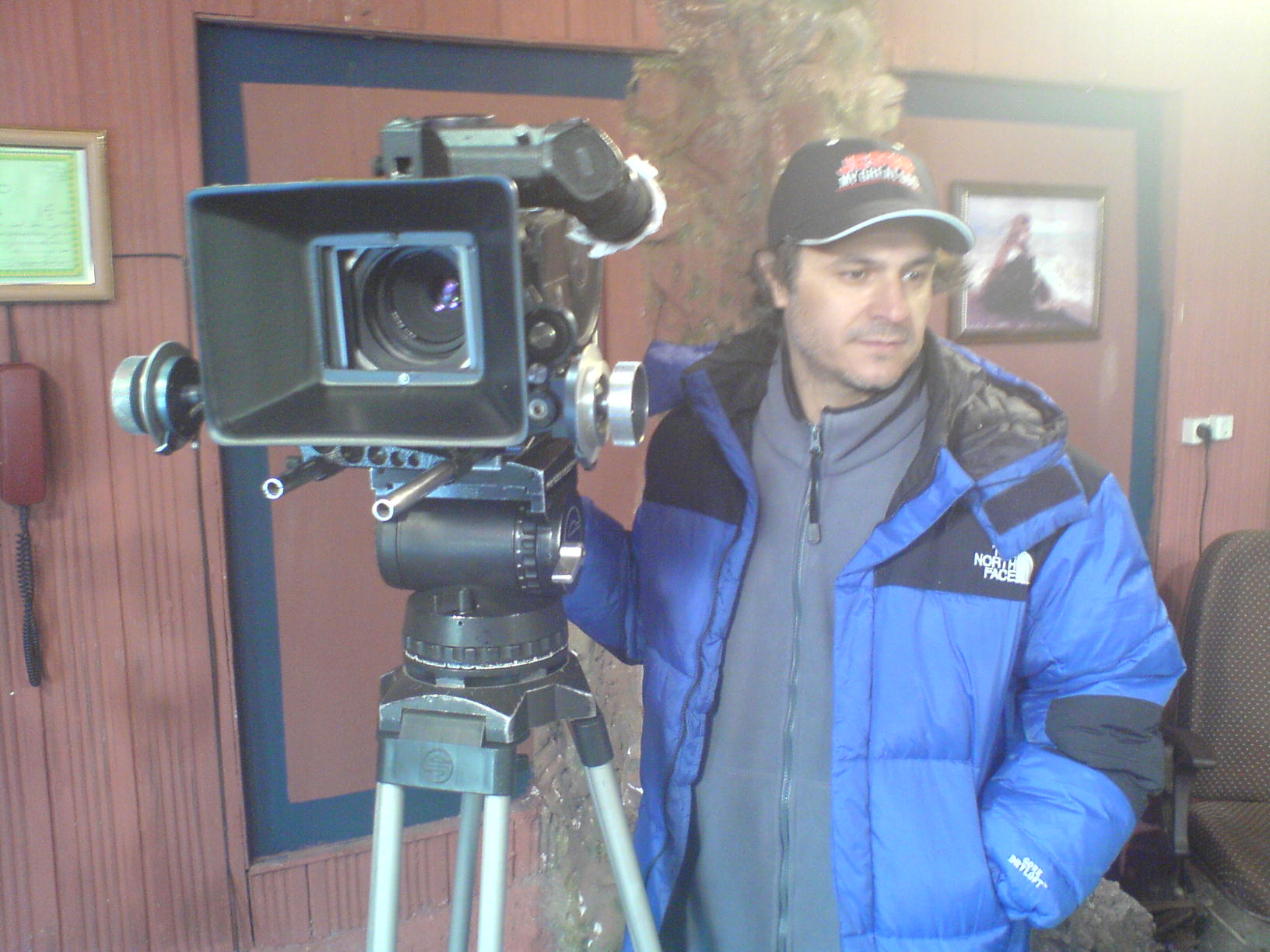
Parviz Shahbazi
