= Peyman Jebelli =

Iranian politician (born 1966)

- پیمان جبلی
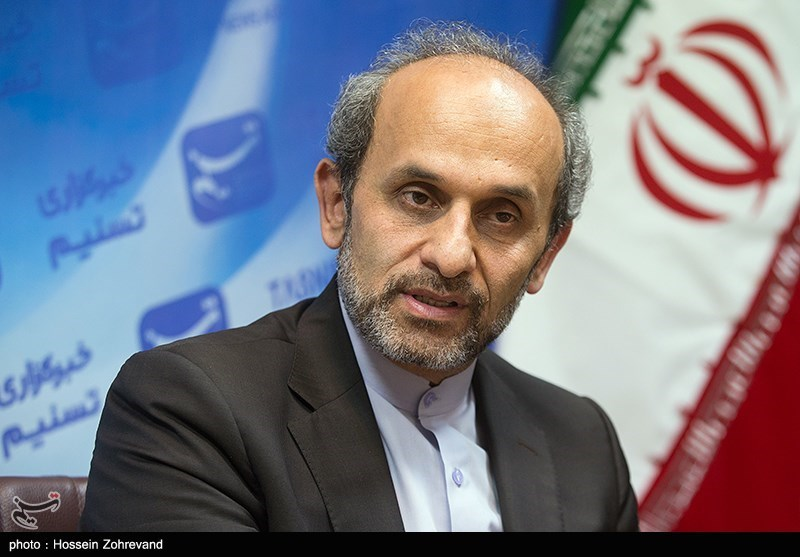

Head of Islamic Republic of Iran Broadcasting
- Incumbent
- Assumed office 29 September 2021
- Appointed by: Ali Khamenei
- Preceded by: Abdulali Ali-Asgari

Iranian Ambassador to Tunisia
- In office 2010–2014
- President: Mahmoud Ahmadinejad Hassan Rouhani
- Preceded by: Mohammad-Taghi Moayyed
- Succeeded by: Mostafa Boroujerdi

Personal details
- Born: 1966 (age 59–60) Shemiran, Iran
- Education: Imam Sadiq University

Peyman Jebelli (Persian: پیمان جبلی; born 1966) is an Iranian official who is serving as the head of the Islamic Republic of Iran Broadcasting. Jebelli was appointed as the head of the Iranian Broadcasting Corporation on 29 September 2021 by a decree of Ali Khamenei. He previously headed the overseas deputy directorate of the IRIB and served as the ambassador of Iran to Tunisia.

== Biography ==
He was born in Shemiran in 1966. He completed his education at Nikan High School. Jabali is an expert and analyst on political issues who has been an employee of the IRIB for many years and has held various positions in the news department in the political deputy. He graduated with a master's degree in Islamic studies and propaganda from Imam Sadiq University in 1993 and received a doctorate in culture and communications in 2004.

Before his position as deputy for foreign affairs of the Islamic Republic of Iran Broadcasting, he was a member of the faculty of the Iranian Broadcasting Corporation, deputy for political affairs (news) of the Iranian Broadcasting Corporation, secretary of foreign news of the evening section of the radio, secretary of foreign and domestic news of the television news, editor of national news of IRIB TV2 of the Iranian Broadcasting Corporation, director general of domestic news of the central news unit, director general of news of the Al-Alam News Network, director of the Al-Alam Network office in Beirut, deputy media secretary of the secretary of the Supreme National Security Council during the tenure of Saeed Jalili, he was the ambassador of the Islamic Republic of Iran to Tunisia.

Peyman Al-Alam has three brothers. One of his brothers is a surgeon who lost his son (Mohammad Amin Al-Alam) on Ukraine International Airlines Flight 752. Meysam and his other brother left Iran after this incident and are seeking asylum abroad.

=== Sanctions ===
On 13 October 2022, the Canadian government announced that it had imposed new sanctions on 17 individuals and 3 entities, including Peyman Jabali, former and current officials of the Islamic Republic of Iran.

On 15 November 2022, the US Treasury Department sanctioned two "interrogators-journalists" and four senior officials of the Islamic Republic of Iran Radio and Television, including Peyman Jabali, on the pretext of broadcasting hundreds of forced confessions from detainees.

On 11 December 2022, the European Union, in conjunction with the execution of two young men arrested during the protests in Iran over the past three months by the courts of the Islamic Republic, placed 20 individuals, including Peyman Jabali and the Islamic Republic of Iran Radio and Television, on its sanctions list for gross violations of human rights.

Media offices
Preceded by Abdulali Ali-Asgari	Director-General of IRIB; 2021-present	Succeeded by Incumbent
