= Taghi Rouhani =

Iranian radio personality (1920–2013)

- Born: Mohammad Taghi Rouhani Moghaddam; 26 July 1920; Tehran, Iran
- Died: 25 June 2013 (aged 92); Tehran, Iran
- Occupation: Radio news anchor
- Agent: NIRT

Mohammad Taghi Rouhani Moghaddam (Persian: ‌تقی روحانی, 26 July 1920 – 25 June 2013), commonly known as Taghi Rouhani, was an Iranian radio news anchor.

== Biography ==
Taghi Rahmani was a famous radio anchor and the host of a quiz show called 20 questions. He worked for NIRT (National Iranian Radio and Television). After the Islamic Revolution, Taghi Rouhani was sentenced by the Revolutionary Court to five years in prison after being convicted of "obstructing the revolution of people" and 80 lashes for drinking alcohol. Before being transferred to prison, he was kidnapped by unknown men. His body was discovered some days later paralyzed and brain damaged from a brutal beating. He was not able to talk and move until his death.
