= IRIB International Conference Center =

Conference Center in Tehran, Iran

Coordinates: 35°47′4.22″N 51°24′43.78″E

- Interactive map of IRIB International Conference Center
- Address: Shahid Chamran Expressway, IRIB complex, Tehran; Iran
- Owner: Islamic Republic of Iran Broadcasting (IRIB)
- Operator: IRIB
- Public transit: Shahid Sadr Metro Station, Amanieh BRT bus station

Construction
- Opened: June 1995
- Construction cost: $550 million

IRIB International Conference Center or IICC is a large convention center and exhibition complex located in northern Tehran, inside the main campus of the Islamic Republic of Iran Broadcasting headquarters. The center is one of the prestigious venues for important gatherings, conferences and concerts in Iran. IICC is one of the most advanced convention center in Iran.

== History ==
The design of the complex was done in 1958 during the government of the Shah of Iran, but its construction started many years later. The center was inaugurated in 1995.

== Configuration and setting ==
- The main hall is named after Khaje Nasir with the capacity of 665 seats. All the seats are equipped with dedicated audio system for live translation and the hall features 5 professional cameras with remote control capability.
- Other halls are also named after Iranian public figures, poets and litterateurs, including Mowlana Hall, Sheikh Bahaii Hall, Sheikh Mofid Hall.
- The exclusive parking lot has a capacity of 150 cars in a 5500 m2 area which is dedicated to privileged and VIP visitors.

== Highlighted event ==
Several academic events and scientific conference are held annually in the IICC including the Banking service marketing international conference, and the Military Medicine Congress. International gatherings that host important keynote speakers such as the Iran-Europe banking forum, the Iranian agricultural congress, the World Tourism Day and the International conference on investment opportunities in urban development and the transportation sector are held at the IICC. IICC is also host to Iranian Science and Culture Hall of Fame.
