= Albert Koochooei =

Albert Koochooei (Persian: آلبرت کوچویی) is an Iranian writer, journalist, translator and radio broadcaster.

== Early life and education ==
Koochooei was born in Hamadan. When he was seven, he moved to Abadan with his family, where he graduated from high school.

He moved to Tehran to continue his education and received his master's degree in Journalism. He has also studied at both the Pars College and Junior College of Translation.

== Career ==
He began his career on the radio and press when he was a teenager and became a presenter on the Oil Company Radio Channel.

He moved to Urmia, where he worked as a producer, writer, Persian-speaking broadcaster and also Assyrian radio supervisor.

Following his move to Tehran for his studies, he worked as a producer and radio host in Islamic Republic of Iran Broadcasting (IRIB).

In 2000, he was the editor of Mosahebeh magazine; in 2002, he was a writer and speaking broadcaster of cultural programs before and after the 1979 Iranian Revolution. In 2004, he was the editor of the journals Tirajeh, Nasime Doosti, Didar and Astaneh. He was an art critic in the newspapers and magazines Ayandegan, Bamshad, ''Ferdosi'' and Khoosheh in the 50s (Iranian calendar)

He was a radio presenter at IRIB Radio Payam.

He is currently a columnist for the Etemad daily newspaper.

== Books ==
- Manuscripts, Albert Koochooei, published by Pooyandeh Publication, 2009
- The Epic of Ghatina, William Danial, translated by Albert Koochooei, Pooyande Publication, 2009
- Like Walking On a Razor, Albert Koochooei, published by Negah Publications, 2013. This book is about journalism, the Iranian press and media before and after the revolution. The writings are based on a detailed discussion between Koochooei and Mohammad Bagher Rezaee.
- Unfinished Concert, Federico García Lorca, translated by Albert Koochooei, published by Pooyandeh Publication, 2014.
- More than three thousand articles and reviews in cultural journals of the country
- Translation of the book of Assyrian Tragedy
- Translation of Pablo Neruda's poetry collection
- Translations of the full collection of Ghatina and Kerma Al Ghooshi

== Awards and recognition ==
Koochooei received an honorary PhD degree in performing arts for his influential presence in performing arts and art criticism. He also won the IRIB International Festival Statue.

In 2016, Koochooei was honored in the National Museum of Iran for his outstanding presence during the preceding 55 years.

He has been active in the Assyrian community and was selected twice as the chair of the Assyrian Association of Tehran. He was also selected three times as the head of the parent-teacher association of the Holy Maryam Educational complex.
