= Mohammad Sarafraz =

Iranian media executive

- محمد سرافراز
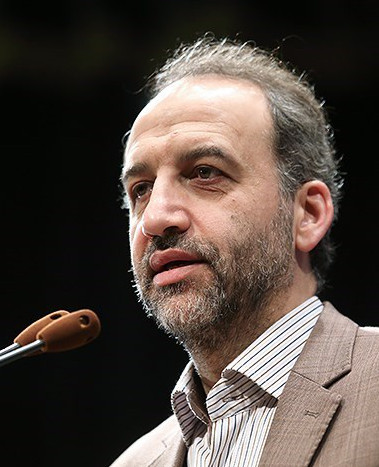

Head of Islamic Republic of Iran Broadcasting
- In office 8 November 2014 – 11 May 2016
- Appointed by: Ali Khamenei
- Preceded by: Ezzatollah Zarghami
- Succeeded by: Abdulali Ali-Asgari

Personal details
- Born: c. 1961 (age 64–65) Tehran, Iran
- Education: Imam Sadiq University; Saint Joseph University

Military service
- Branch/service: Revolutionary Guards
- Years of service: 1983-1987
- Battles/wars: Iran–Iraq War: Siege of Basra (WIA)

Mohammad Sarafraz (Persian: محمد سرافراز) is an Iranian media executive who was head of Islamic Republic of Iran Broadcasting (IRIB) from 2014 until his resignation in 2016.

He was the 6th director-general of the IRIB and succeeded Ezatollah Zarghami on November 10, 2014. He holds a Ph.D. in political sciences from Saint Joseph University of Beirut and MA from Imam Sadiq University . He is active in IRIB since 1993 in different posts and played a crucial role in launching Press TV, Hispan TV, al-Alam and iFilm television channels.

== Careers in IRIB ==
Sarafraz was active in the Islamic Republic of Iran Broadcasting (IRIB) from 1993 and holds the position of deputy director-general in foreign affairs since 1995, being appointed by then director-general Mohammad Hashemi Rafsanjani. He played a crucial role in launching Press TV, HispanTV, al-Alam and iFilm television channels.

On 1 November 2014, Sarafraz became new director-general of IRIB, succeeding Ezzatollah Zarghami. He officially takes office on 10 November. On 11 May 2016, he resigned from his post due to illness.

== Controversy ==
In 2013, the European Union adopted restrictive measures against Sarafraz and recognized him as being associated with violating human rights and working with the Iranian security services and prosecutors to broadcast forced confessions of detainees.

Media offices
New title	Chairman of Press TV; 2007–2014	Succeeded by Ali Ejarehdar
Preceded by Ezatollah Zarghami	Director-General of IRIB; 2014–2016	Succeeded by Abdulali Ali-Asghari
