= Sirous Ranjbar =

Iranian filmmaker (born 1963)

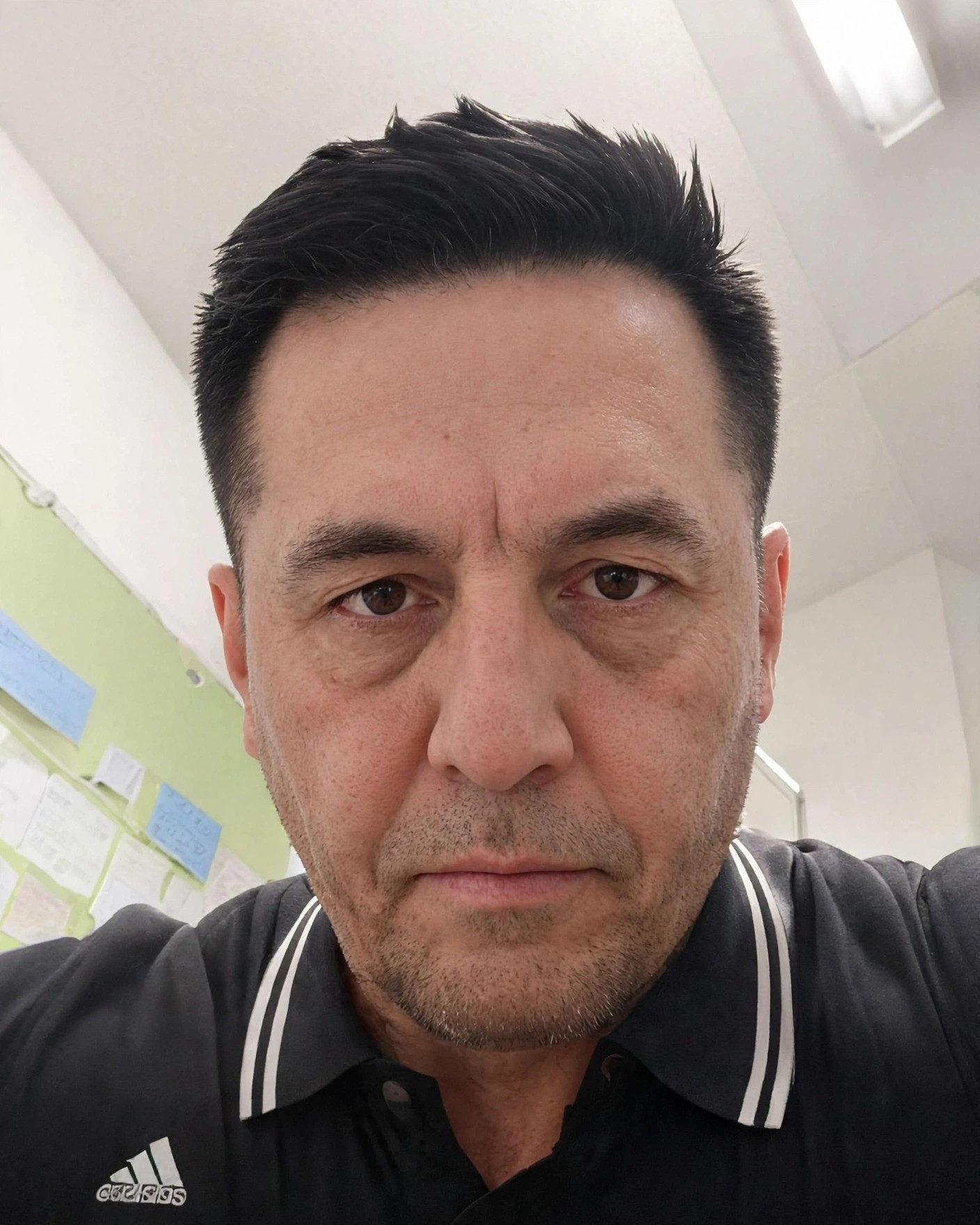
- Born: September 21, 1963 (age 63); Tehran, Iran
- Occupations: Director, Screenwriter

Sirous Ranjbar (also known as Cyrus Ranjbar, born September 21, 1963 in Tehran, Iran) is an Iranian film director and screenwriter.

== Biography ==
Ranjbar holds a Bachelor's degree in Film Production from IRIB University and a Master's degree in Philosophy of Law from the University of Tehran. He began his career in the early 1990s as an assistant director on feature films including The Altar of Fire (1992) and The Traveller from the South (1995). He subsequently worked as a director, screenwriter, editor, and producer for feature films and television series. He also served as a script reader and member of the screenplay evaluation committee at the Farabi Cinema Foundation, Iran's national film foundation established under the Ministry of Culture and Islamic Guidance.

His directorial feature debut, Call of Gabriel (Awa-ye Jebraeil, 2004), was submitted to the Fajr International Film Festival and competed in the Cinema nel mondo section at the 2005 Taormina Film Fest in Italy.

Ranjbar's 2012 feature film The Autumnal Mother (Madar-e Paeezi), starring Hanieh Tavassoli, screened at the Fajr International Film Festival and won an award at the 42nd Roshd International Film Festival. The film was also featured and reviewed at the Health Film Festival in Tehran.

== Director ==
- Call of Gabriel (Awa-ye Jebraeil) (2004)
- The Autumnal Mother (Madar-e Paeezi) (2012)
- A Few Alleys Down the Street (Chand Koocheh Paaintar) (2013)
- Farangis (2015) - documentary
- The Vertical Ladder (Nardeban-e Amoodi) (1993) - short film
- The Little Filmmaker (1996) - TV series

== Screenwriter ==
- Diplomat (1995)
- Call of Gabriel (2004)
- Out of Heaven (2006)
- Burden of Being (2008)
- The Autumnal Mother (2012)
- Sayeh (2015)

== Editor ==
Feature Films

- Like Mania (Shabih-e Sheydaei), 2014 (Directed by Nasser Pooyesh)
- A Few Alleys Down the Street (Chand Koocheh Paaintar), 2013
- Call of Gabriel (Awa-ye Jebraeil), 2004

== Producer ==
Feature Films

- The Autumnal Mother, 2012
- Call of Gabriel (Awa-ye Jebraeil), 2004

== Novels ==
- Where Shadows Breathe, 2025
- Narges: Symphony of a Life, 2026
