= Reza Ghotbi =

Iranian engineer (1938–2024)

Reza Ghotbi (Persian: رضا قطبی; full name: Abdorreza Ghotbi Gilani; 5 April 1938 – 26 August 2024) was an Iranian mathematician and telecommunications engineer who led the National Iranian Radio and Television from 1967 to 1978 during the reign of Mohammad Reza Pahlavi.

== Early life and education ==
An ardent nationalist from early childhood, Ghotbi joined the grassroots Pan-Iranist movement (not the Party) at age 11, a year earlier than the regulations allowed, while attending Firouzkouhi primary school. He was wholly devoted to the Shah but also a fervent admirer of Prime Minister Mosaddeq. The feud between the two turned him off politics altogether and focused him on his studies at Alborz High School, sports and scouting. After high school, he left for France where he graduated in mathematics and telecommunications from the Ecole Centrale and the Telecom Paris.

In 1968, Ghotbi married Shahrzad Afshar in Tehran. The couple had two children.

== Career ==
Ghotbi taught mathematics at the Aryamehr University of Technology (renamed Sharif University post-revolution). The Plan Organization (Sazman-e Barnameh) retained and assigned him to develop a blueprint for building a national Iranian television. He intended to pursue his passion for mathematics at MIT once his task was accomplished but was asked to stay and lead the National Iranian Television (NITV) upon its founding in 1967. In 1971, NITV merged with Radio Iran and renamed the National Iranian Radio and Television (NIRT).

From the start, Ghotbi recruited experts as well as young talent that developed into media and technology professionals under training. The television network was soon expanded to encompass broadcasting and production facilities across the country. With teams of experts, and programs in education, current affairs, and entertainment, NIRT evolved into a major broadcasting network in the region.

Within a year of the founding of NITV, Ghotbi was also asked to form and lead the annual Shiraz Arts Festival under the patronage of Shahbanou Farah Pahlavi. The international performing arts festival was held from 1967-1977 in Shiraz, Persepolis, and Naqsh-e Rostam. He next launched the Tous Festival on Iranian epic traditions, in Mashhad, and Festival-e Farhang-e Mardom, on popular culture, in Esfahan.

Reza Ghotbi also founded satellite organizations at NITV/NIRT to promote research, education, and training in arts, culture, and communications technology. These included Gorouh-e pazhouhesh-e Iran Zamin (Iran Research Group), Markaz-e hefz va esha'e-ye musiqi-ye Iran (Center for the Preservation and Propagation of Iranian Music), Madresseh-ye āli-ye cinema va television (College of Cinema and Television), Kargah-e musiqi-ye koodakan va nojavanan (Music Workshop for Children and Young Adults), Kargah-e nemayesh (Theater Workshop), Majalleh-ye Tamasha (Tamasha magazine), Entesharat-e Soroush (Soroush Publishing), and TelFilm, among others.

In leading NIRT and the Shiraz Arts Festival, Ghotbi resisted efforts by the security apparatus SAVAK to impose censorship and interfere in the hiring of personnel. Twice, he felt compelled to submit his resignation to the prime minister on that account; his request was denied both times. His final resignation was accepted in 1978 shortly before Prime Minister Amouzegar was replaced by Jafar Sharif-Emami.

== Later years ==
Ghotbi left Iran several months after the 1979 Islamic revolution. He lived in Paris for some years before settling in the United States but in time moved back to Paris to be close to his children and grandchildren.

Ghotbi died in Paris after a short bout with cancer on 26 August 2024 at age 86.
