= Ezzatollah Zarghami =

Iranian politician

Seyyed Sardar Ezatollah Zarghami
- عزت‌الله ضرغامی
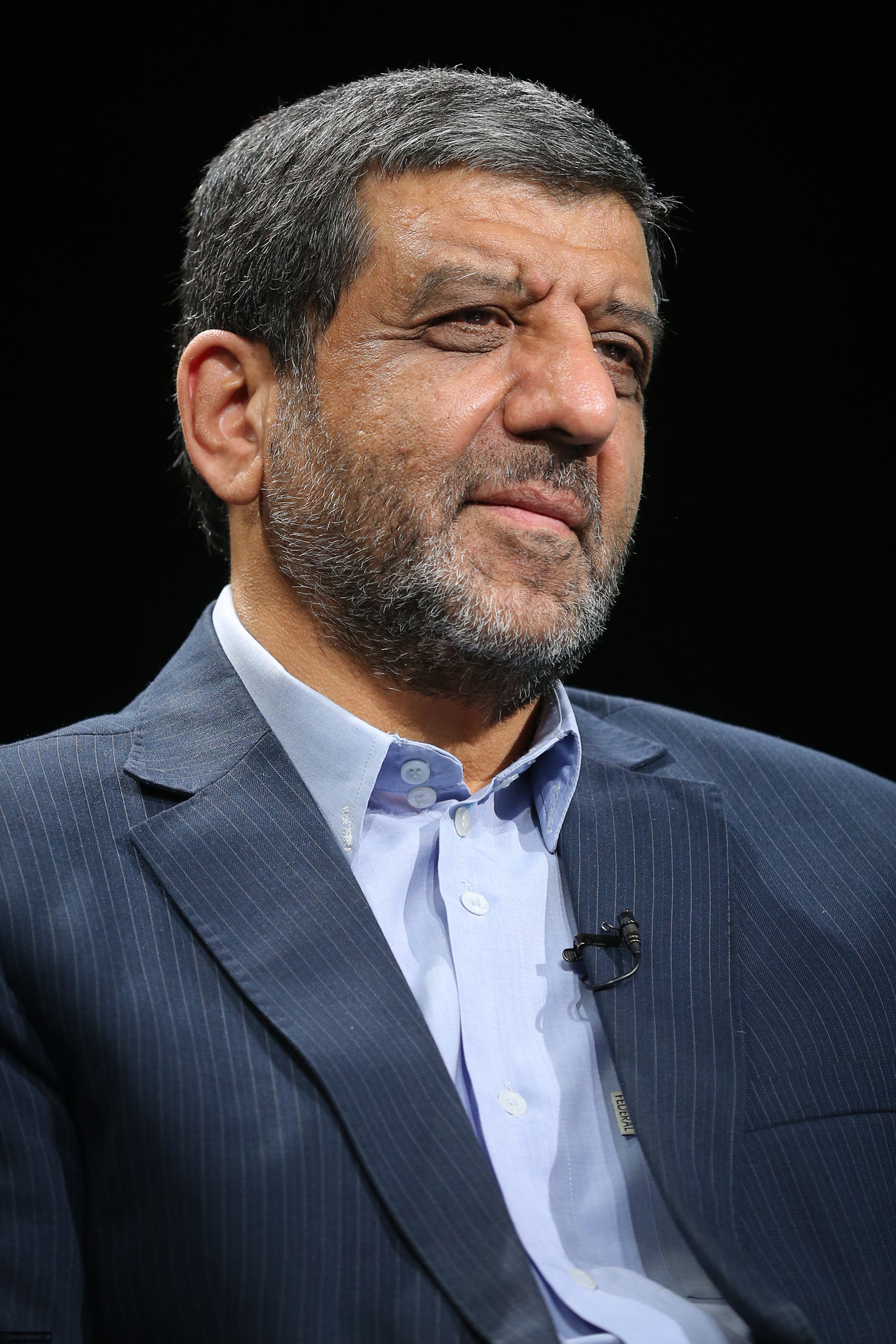
- Zarghami in 2020
- Military career
- Allegiance: Islamic Revolutionary Guard Corps
- Branch: Revolutionary Committees; Revolutionary Guards
- Service years: 1982–1995; 1997–2004
- Rank: 2nd Brigadier general
- Conflicts: Iran–Iraq War

Minister of Cultural Heritage, Tourism and Handicrafts
- In office 25 August 2021 – 21 August 2024
- President: Ebrahim Raisi; Mohammad Mokhber (acting)
- Preceded by: Ali Asghar Mounesan
- Succeeded by: Reza Salehi Amiri

Head of Islamic Republic of Iran Broadcasting
- In office 23 May 2004 – 8 November 2014
- Appointed by: Ali Khamenei
- Preceded by: Ali Larijani
- Succeeded by: Mohammad Sarafraz

Personal details
- Born: Seyyed Ezatollah Zarghami; 26 February 1959 (age 67) Tehran, Pahlavi Iran
- Party: JAMNA
- Education: Amir Kabir University; Islamic Azad University
- Website: zarghami-ez.ir

Ezzatollah Zarghami (Persian: عزت‌الله ضرغامی; born 26 February 1959) is an Iranian conservative politician and former minister of Ministry of Cultural Heritage, Tourism and Handicrafts. He is a former military officer. Zarghami was Deputy of Minister in Culture and Islamic Ministry as well as Defence Ministry before holding office as the head of Islamic Republic of Iran Broadcasting from 2004 to 2014.

== Early life ==
Zarghami was born into a religious family in 1959. Despite his father never purchasing a television, Zarghami became a cinephile. While in high school, he was the classmate of Hassan Tehrani-Moghaddam, who is widely regarded as the father of Iran's domestic ballistic missile program: Tehrani-Moghaddam was killed in 2011. At the time of the Islamic Revolution in 1979, Zarghami was a 20-year-old student in the civil engineering program at Amirkabir University. He took part in the seizure of the American Embassy in Tehran, which ultimately lad to the severing of US-Iranian diplomatic relations. He eventually joined the newly formed IRGC as a radio anchor during the Iran-Iraq War.

== Career ==
For part of the Iran–Iraq War, Zarghami was in charge of teams tasked with the domestic production of missiles, a necessity due to many countries' refusal to sell weapons to Iran. Zarghami eventually departed from the IRGC as the rank of general; he has cited his interest in politics as his motivation for leaving. In 1995, he became deputy cultural minister overseeing cinematic affairs; he held the post for two years, during which he implemented tough restrictions on content, despite the distaste of many cinema activists. During this time, President Hashemi Rafsanjani distanced himself from Zarghami. Contradicting his harsh tenure, he has claimed to have 'paved the way' for artists in Iran. In 2004, Supreme Leader Ali Khamemei appointed him to head of the state broadcasting service, Islamic Republic of Iran Broadcasting (IRIB), a post that he held for ten years. His predecessor was Ali Larijani. Throughout Mahmoud Ahmadinejad's presidency, Zarghami was accused of covering events in a biased manner. Zarghami developed a close relationship with Ahmadinejad, which he has maintained; Zarghami accompanied the then-president Ahmadinejad on his trip to the United Nations General Assembly in 2010, and the two often took phone calls with one another during the latter's term in office. After the 2009 Presidential Elections protests, many blamed Zarghami and the IRIB's biased coverage for provoking reformists to mobilize. His tenure ended in 2014, after which he became more of an active presence on social media platforms; he held meeting with controversial Iranian politicians from the left and right, portraying himself as an "inclusive politician".

=== Controversy ===
Zarghami, among other 16 Iranian Officials, was sanctioned by the European Union on 23 March 2012 "for committing human rights abuses." As per Executive Order 13628, Zarghami was sanctioned by the US under the category "Entities Designated as Human Rights Abusers or Limiting Free Expression" in February 2013.

He was also criticized for allegedly trying to prevent Iranian President Hassan Rouhani from appearing on his network for a scheduled interview in February 2014. The allegations stemmed from Rouhani and Zarghami's disagreement over whom the interviewer for Rouhani's televised address on his first 100 days in office would be, resulting in an hour delay of the program.

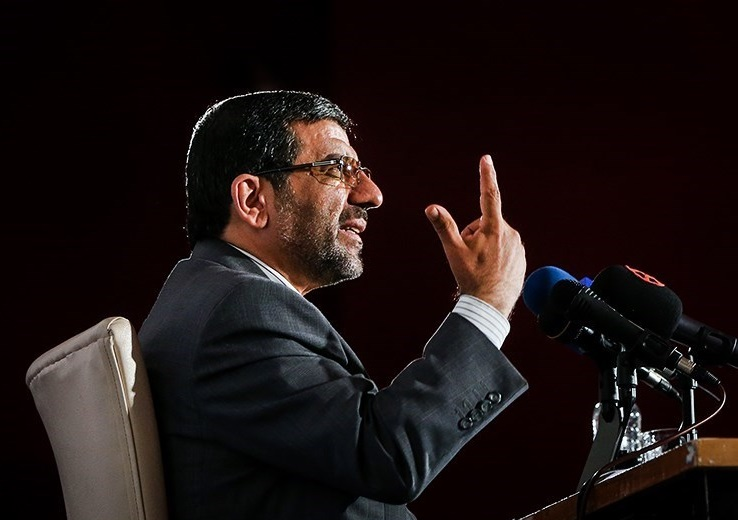
Ezatollah Zarghami speaking at 14th Moghavemat International Film Festival

Zarghami got into an argument with President Rouhani at a meeting of the Supreme Council of the Cultural Revolution, in which he accused Rouhani of making remarks that were "against Islamic and revolutionary values."

== Presidential nomination ==
=== 2017 election ===
On 15 March 2017, Zarghami announced his candidacy for 2017 presidential election via his social media accounts. He said he "has felt the responsibility to fix the country’s management structure on a macro scale", accepting "the invitation of the Popular Front of Islamic Revolution Forces". Zarghami who was speculated as a potential candidate since late 2014, denied the possibility of his own candidacy in November 2015.

=== 2021 election ===
Zarghami announced his candidacy for the 2021 presidential election during an interview with Arman Newspaper, stating that "I have come to the conclusion that elections, in general, are a pain in the neck". Many speculate that Zarghami sides with Supreme Leader Ali Khamenei, seeking to abolish the position of presidency in Iran in favor of a more heavily parliamentary system. However, his nomination was rejected by the Guardian Council.

== Ministry of Cultural Heritage, Tourism and Handicrafts ==
Zarghami was introduced to the parliament by Seyyed Ebrahim Raisi on August 11, 1400, as the Minister of Cultural Heritage, Tourism and Handicrafts proposed by the 13th government.

Many experts believe that Zarghami's media background and her mastery of cyberspace, along with her extensive contacts with government institutions, could lead to a serious change in the field of tourism and the recognition of Iran's historical heritage worldwide.

Political offices
Preceded by Mehdi Faridzadeh	Deputy Minister of Culture in Cinema Affairs; 1995–1997	Succeeded by Seifollah Dad
Media offices
Preceded by Ali Larijani	Director-General of IRIB; 2004–2014	Succeeded by Mohammad Sarafraz
