= Islamic Republic of Iran Broadcasting =

Iranian state-owned media company

Coordinates: 35°47′4.22″N 51°24′43.78″E

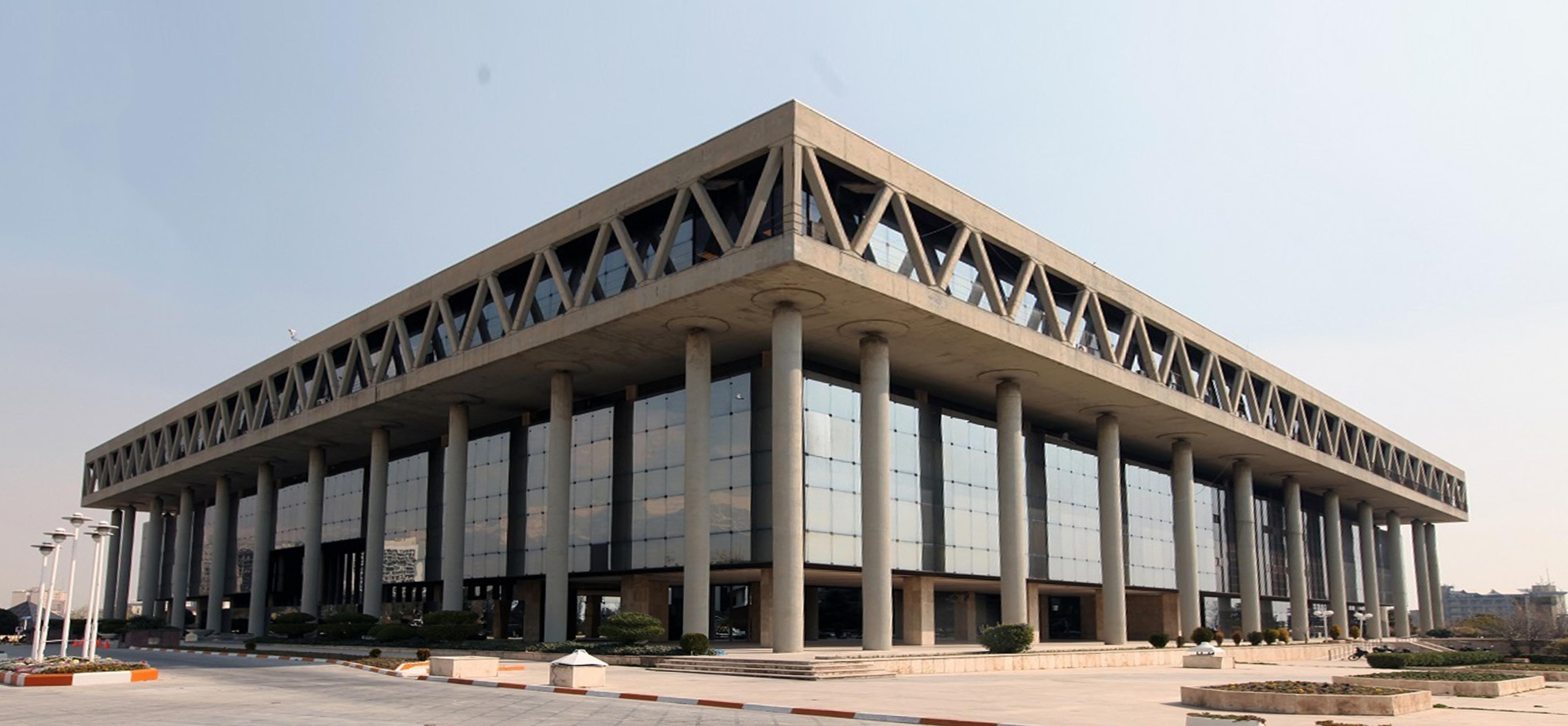
- IRIB Glass Building in Jame Jam, Tehran (2021)
- Type: Broadcast radio, television and online
- Country: Iran
- Availability: National; International
- Revenue: 40 trillion IRR ($950 million) (2019)
- Headquarters: Jaame Jam, Valiasr Street, Tehran
- Owner: Government of Iran (publicly owned)
- Key people: Peyman Jebelli (Director-General); Mohsen Barmahani (Vice Director-General)
- Launch date: 1940; 86 years ago (radio); 1958; 68 years ago (television); 1966; 60 years ago (incorporated); 1979; 47 years ago (current form)
- Former names: National Iranian Radio and Television
- Official website: www.irib.ir

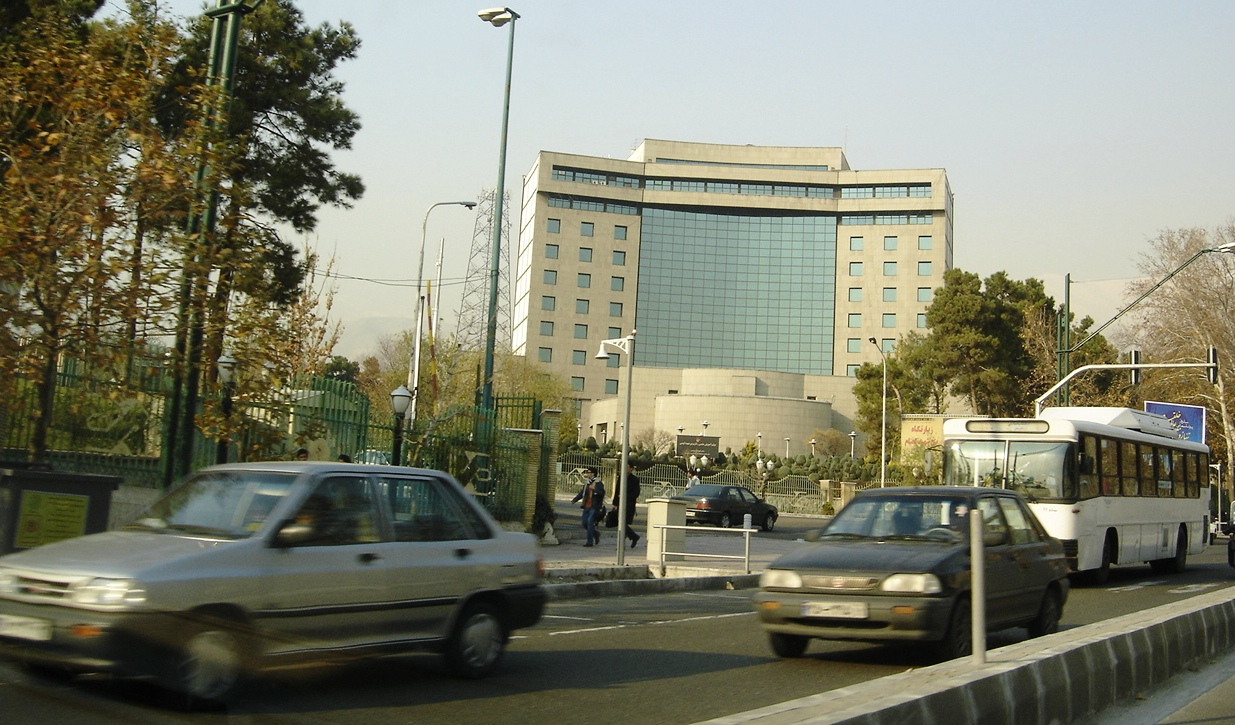
IRIB's northeast gate along Valiasr Street, Tehran

The Islamic Republic of Iran Broadcasting (IRIB; Persian: سازمان صدا و سیمای جمهوری اسلامی ایران, romanized: Sazmân-e Sedâ-o-simâ-ye Jomhuri-ye Eslâmi-ye Irân, lit. 'Voice and Vision Service of the Islamic Republic of Iran') or Seda o Sima (Persian: صدا و سیما, lit. 'Voice and Vision') for short, formerly called National Iranian Radio and Television until the Iranian Revolution of 1979, is an Iranian state-controlled media corporation that holds a monopoly of domestic radio and television services in Iran. It is also among the largest media organizations in Asia and the Pacific region and a regular member of the Asia-Pacific Broadcasting Union. Its head is appointed directly by the supreme leader.

With 13,000 employees and branches in 20 countries worldwide, including Italy, France, Belgium, Guyana, Malaysia, Lebanon, the United Kingdom, the Islamic Republic of Iran Broadcasting offers both domestic and foreign radio and television services, broadcasting 12 domestic television channels, four international news television channels, six satellite television channels for international audiences, and 30 provincial television channels countrywide, half of which are broadcast in minority-status languages in Iran, such as Azerbaijani and Kurdish, as well as the local dialects of Persian. IRIB provides 12 radio stations for domestic audiences, and through the IRIB World Service, 30 radio stations are available for foreign and international audiences. It also publishes the Persian-language newspaper Jam-e Jam.

== History ==
=== Pahlavi era ===
On 24 April 1940, Radio Iran was officially opened by Shah Mohammad Reza Pahlavi — the then crown prince of Iran — with Isa Sedigh as the first head of the company. The channel broadcast five hour programs including news, traditional and western music, religious and sports programming as well as programs dedicated to economic and political discussion. according to estimates from the Statistical Center of Iran, in 1976 about 76% of urban population and 45% of rural population had access to the radio.

National Iranian Television officially opened on 21 March 1967 to create National Iranian Radio and Television. At that time, hardware equipment was at the disposal of the Ministry of Post, Telegraph and Telephone and its media was producing by Advertising and publishing department. In later years, radio and television expansion request across the country to create an integrated entity and from 1971 all facilities were given to National Radio and Television. The Shah personally appointed Reza Ghotbi as head of organization, and the duration of the programs increased quickly.

Before the 1979 revolution about 40% of TV programs were foreign, and imported and internal programs were usually modeled after foreign programs. After the revolution two TV channels (first program and second program) were active and with facility expansion, more than 95% of the urban population and about 75% of the overall population was able to receive TV signals.

=== Islamic Republic ===
During the Iranian Revolution, when Gholam Reza Azhari became prime minister of Iran, Touraj Farazmand was chosen for head of National Iranian Radio and Television after Reza Ghotbi.

The organization expanded greatly after the revolution, and in addition to internal and global broadcasting channels, it manages more than 100 electronic and written media.

Since the late 2000s, IRIB has significantly expanded its operations. From operating seven terrestrial and three satellite channels in 2007, the broadcaster grew to encompass 12 national channels, 33 provincial channels, two internet-based channels and 10 international outlets by 2013. Beginning in 2010, IRIB launched several digital and high-definition thematic channels, including those dedicated to health, animation and teleshopping. These expansions occurred despite international sanctions and the partial blocking of its broadcasts abroad.

While remaining within ideological boundaries set by the government, IRIB has softened some aspects of its programming style, with observers noting an increased use of vibrant production design, limited incorporation of pop music and more relaxed visual presentation standards. The broadcaster has also adopted elements from Western television formats and engaged more directly with themes popularized by foreign Persian-language channels (often hostile to the Islamic Republic). The 24-hour film channel Namayesh frequently broadcast Persian-dubbed Hollywood films, with sensitive content censored digitally.

IRIB has also permitted more discussion of social and political issues with one sport talk show allowing callers to air grievances extending beyond sports, including criticism of public officials. Documentary programs on IRIB also adopted an investigative format to address social issues and even publicly questioning the accountability of authorities. These changes have drawn criticism from conservative clerical figures, with one prominent cleric condemning IRIB for airing a comedy series that featured a clerical character.

In a 2012 BBC/Gallup poll, 86 percent of respondents regarded IRIB as their primary source of information, while 26 percent reported using satellite television in a country with near-universal television ownership.

In 2014, IRIB briefly showed musicians performing with traditional Persian instruments during a morning breakfast program on IRIB TV1, marking a rare on-screen appearance after more than three decades of restrictions on displaying instruments on state television. On previous occasions, only the singer was allowed on screen, while the musicians were only permitted to play backstage or the scenes which featured them would cut away to flowers and beautiful landscapes. Although many observers interpreted the moment as a possible easing of cultural restrictions, the program's producer later clarified the appearance as a mistake and insisted that broadcasting policies had not changed. The incident highlighted ongoing tensions in Iran over music instruments on state media that reflected long-standing skepticism by conservative clerics and criticism by the public over the restrictive policies.

By 2016, domestic online channels, foreign Persian-language channels and social media networks had begun to challenge the monopoly of IRIB.

==== Twelve-Day War ====
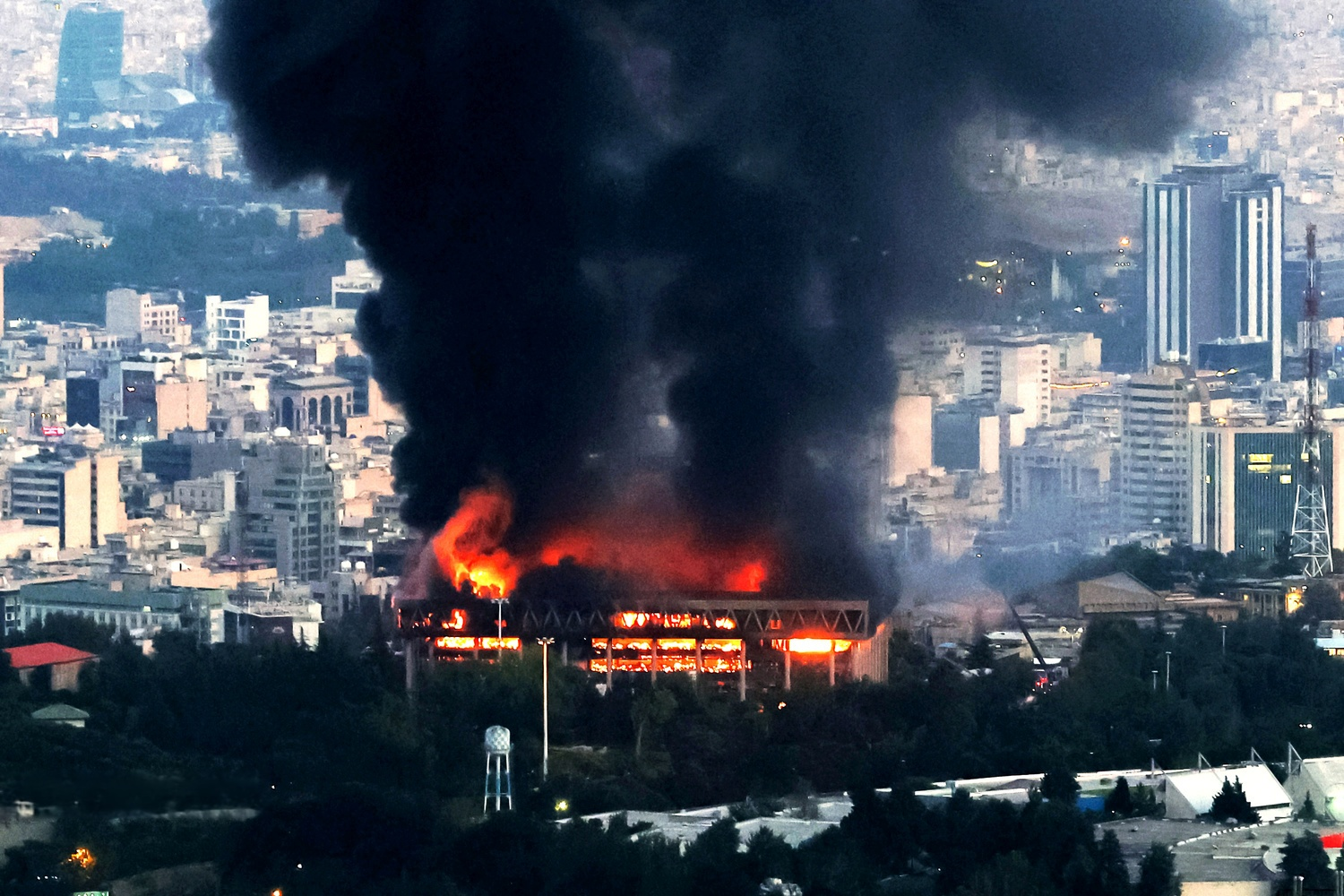
Israeli attack on IRIB studio in Tehran (16 June 2025)

During the Twelve-Day War, IRIB's headquarters including the studio of Islamic Republic of Iran News Network (IRINN) in Tehran was hit by an Israeli airstrike on 16 June during a live broadcast resulting in a temporary halt in programming. Two IRIB employees, including IRINN's editor-in-chief, were killed in the attack, while the station said its offices were struck by four bombs. The attack was condemned as a war crime by the International Federation of Journalists, saying "under international law, journalists are civilians, and deliberate attacks against them constitute war crimes". The Committee to Protect Journalists also condemned the strike. During this attack, the presenter's bravery went viral on social media. The crew shouted "Allah-u-Akbar" several times, when the bombs landed.

==== 2025–2026 Iranian protests ====
On 9 January, during nation wide protests, a fire broke out at an IRIB office in Isfahan. On 18 January, several IRIB channels were briefly hacked. During the disruption, videos related to the protests were aired, including a message from Reza Pahlavi directed at the protesters.

==== 2026 Iran war censor ====
In the US-Iran talks IRIB cut the live broadcast TV interview of parliamentary speaker Mohammad Bagher Ghalibaf after he criticized the Iranian memorandum of agreement with the US and regime opponents.

=== Broadcasting sign ===
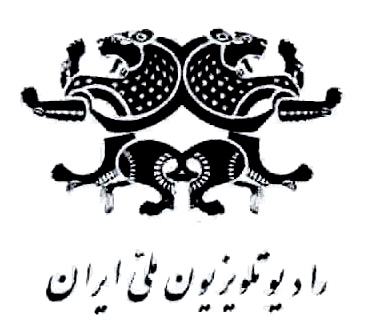
Sign of National Iranian Radio and Television

Sign of Islamic Republic of Iran Broadcasting

The IRIB sign includes the Emblem of the Islamic Republic at the top and two characters "لا". When this sign was conceived at the beginning of the revolution, it represented the revolution's slogan of "neither Eastern, nor Western – Islamic Republic" and thus symbolized denial of both capitalist and communist influence or specifically the United States and Soviet Union. These two words at the middle get together like a channel and there is an eye sign at the intersection of them (which was later adapted into the logo of the flagship television channel). At the bottom of the sign, Islamic Republic of Iran Broadcasting phrase is written in Nastaliq font in the Persian language.

== Organisational structure ==
According to Article 175 of the Iranian constitution,

1. The freedom of expression and dissemination of thoughts in the Radio and Television of the Islamic Republic of Iran must be guaranteed in keeping with the Islamic criteria and the best interests of the country.
2. The appointment and dismissal of the head of the Radio and Television of the Islamic Republic of Iran rest with the Leader. A council consisting of two representatives each of the President, the head of the judiciary branch, and the Islamic Consultative Assembly, the Iranian parliament shall supervise the functioning of this organization.
3. The policies and the manner of managing the organization and its supervision will be determined by law.

== YouTube revenue ==
The organization makes dollar revenue of YouTube and has once had its accounts taken down for sanctions breach and propaganda.

== Channels operated by IRIB ==
- IRIB TV1: Iran's first and longest-running television channel, launched in 1958. It offers a wide array of programs including drama series, major Iranian movie premieres, talk shows, news coverage, and live broadcasts of the Friday prayers.
- IRIB TV2: Similar to IRIB TV1, IRIB TV2 offers a variety of programming, including miniseries, comedies, children's content, talk shows, news, and original films. It is promoted as the family-friendly network of the IRIB family.
- IRIB TV3: Known for its youth-oriented content, IRIB TV3 places a significant emphasis on sports, airing major Iranian sporting events, along with comedies, mini-series, and both local and international movies.
- IRIB TV4: A channel with a more intellectual focus, IRIB TV4 showcases documentaries, academic discussions, interviews with scholars, artistic films, economic shows, theatrical productions, and philosophical programs.
- IRIB TV5/IRIB Tehran: Dedicated to viewers in Tehran, this channel features content tailored to the local audience.
- IRINN: IRIB's primary news channel, providing updates on current events along with coverage of sports, science, and health topics.
- Press TV: An English-language, 24-hour news channel that focuses on Iranian foreign policy. It has been accused of broadcasting government-backed propaganda, which has led to its bans and sanctions in several Western countries.

== Affiliates ==
- Telewebion is the official internet live stream and video-on-demand service of the IRIB organization.
- Jam-e Jam is the official organ of the IRIB organization.
- IRIB News Department is a news agency affiliated to the IRIB organization.
- Young Journalists Club is a subsidiary media outlet of IRIB.
- IRIB has a movie production company, called Sima Film.
- IRIB also outsources media production to numerous privately owned domestic media companies.
- TAKTA Co. produces technical equipment such as transmission and switching systems for IRIB
- Soroush Rasaneh Co. IT & ICT Company related to IRIB which provides IPTV services and it has 26 branch offices in Iran.
- Soroush Multimedia Co. provides CD/DVD of IRIB programs and holds some special short term education in 31 offices all over Iran.
- IRIB Pension Fund Co. is the holding company of 17 companies related to IRIB, such as Soroush Multimedia Co., Soroush Rasaneh Co., and TAKTA CO.
- IRIB University provides some courses related to media
- IRIB Research Center is responsible for research in the social and religious fields related to media.
- IRIB Media Trade, known before as Cima Media Int'l, is the sole representative of IRIB in the distribution of its productions (documentaries, feature films, TV series, telefilms and animations) as well as program acquisition for local IRIB TV channels.
- IRIB HD was a television channel run by IRIB. It was launched on 15 June 2014. This channel was a channel for test HD broadcasting. At 25 January 2016, it was removed in Tehran and replaced by provincial channel IRIB Tehran, as IRIB TV5 has been national.

== Heads ==
Head of the Islamic Republic of Iran Broadcasting
- Incumbent; Peyman Jebelli since 29 September 2021
- Reports to: Council of representatives of two each from: President of Iran; Head of the Judiciary; Islamic Consultative Assembly
- Appointer: Supreme Leader of Iran
- Constituting instrument: Article 175 of the Constitution of Iran
- Precursor: Director-General of National Iranian Radio and Television (1966–1979)
- Inaugural holder: Reza Ghotbi
- Formation: 1966 (as Director-General of National Iranian Radio and Television)

The director-general of IRIB is Peyman Jebelli, who was appointed by the Supreme Leader of Iran in 2021.

| # | President | Years | Time in post |
|---|---|---|---|
| 1 | Reza Ghotbi | 1966–1979 | 13 years |
| 2 | Sadegh Ghotbzadeh | 1979 | 1 year |
| — | Mohammad Mousavi Khoeiniha (acting) & Other acting committees | 1979–1981 | 2 years |
| 3 | Mohammad Hashemi Rafsanjani | 1981–1994 | 12 years |
| 4 | Ali Larijani | 1994–2004 | 10 years |
| 5 | Ezzatollah Zarghami | 2004–2014 | 10 years |
| 6 | Mohammad Sarafraz | 2014–2016 | 2 years |
| 7 | Abdulali Ali-Asgari | 2016–2021 | 5 years |
| 8 | Peyman Jebelli | 2021–present | In office |

== Controversies ==
IRIB is widely regarded by the Western world, Israel and the Arab Gulf countries as an Iranian propaganda organization.

The isolation of Iran’s movie industry has forced filmmakers to reorient themselves around national television broadcasters. These networks churn out ideological products in line with the state’s Islamic gender norms, with women sometimes cast in traditional roles and deferential to men, who are portrayed as their guardians and protectors. Amid the intensified conflict with the United States, Iran’s security establishment has emerged as a major producer of blockbuster television and film centering on the prowess of the Revolutionary Guards and its intelligence services. Iran is awash in sophisticated domestic versions of Homeland, and lacks the self-interrogating, subversive cinema that allows a society to have a public conversation with itself about gender, culture, marriage, and power.

=== Allegations of false confessions ===
A study published in June 2020 by the Justice for Iran and the International Federation for Human Rights claimed that Iranian television had broadcast the potentially coerced confessions of 355 detainees since 2010. Former prisoners stated they had been beaten and been threatened with sexual violence as a means for their false confessions to be delivered for use by the country's broadcasters.

=== Censorship of reformists ===
IRIB, along with other Iranian state-run media, tend to censor or silence voices or opinions of reformist politicians as well as ridicule them even as the reformists are in power since IRIB's editorial bias is closer to the Supreme Leader and the Principlists.

=== Resignation over cover-up of aircraft shootdown ===
In January 2020, multiple high-profile anchors and journalists resigned from IRIB in protest towards the network's delayed admission and initial cover-up of the accidental shootdown of Ukraine International Airlines Flight 752.

=== April 2024 Iranian strikes in Israel ===
In April 2024, IRIB reported on the April 2024 Iranian strikes against Israel — but it actually showed footage of a fire in Chile filmed several months prior.

=== Religious insults ===
In 1989, five IRIB employees were prosecuted over a radio report in which Fatimah, the daughter of the Prophet Muhammad, was described as not being a suitable role model for women since she lived centuries ago. The incident reportedly resulted in lashes and purges in the agency.

In April 2025, four IRIB employees were arrested on charges related to the airing of a TV program insulting the Sunni caliph Abu Bakr. IRIB head Peiman Jebeli condemned the remarks as “sedition” and “unforgivable wrongdoing.”

== International sanctions ==
=== United States ===
Pursuant to the United States Presidential Executive Order 13628, the Islamic Republic of Iran Broadcasting is subjected to U.S. sanctions under the Iran Threat Reduction and Syria Human Rights Act which gives the U.S. Treasury Department the authority to designate those in Iran who restrict or deny the free flow of information to or from the Iranian people.

=== European Union ===
IRIB was placed in the list of sanctioned entities of the European Union in December 2022 due to its role in the repression of the Mahsa Amini protests. Following this order, Eutelsat ceased broadcasts of the IRIB international channels for the Europe region via Hot Bird satellite on 21 December 2022.

== See also ==
- IRIB International Conference Center
- Mass media of Iran
  - Television in Iran
- Censorship in Iran
- Sobh International Media Festival
